= Kerin ministry =

70th ministry of government of South Australia

- 70th ministry of South Australia

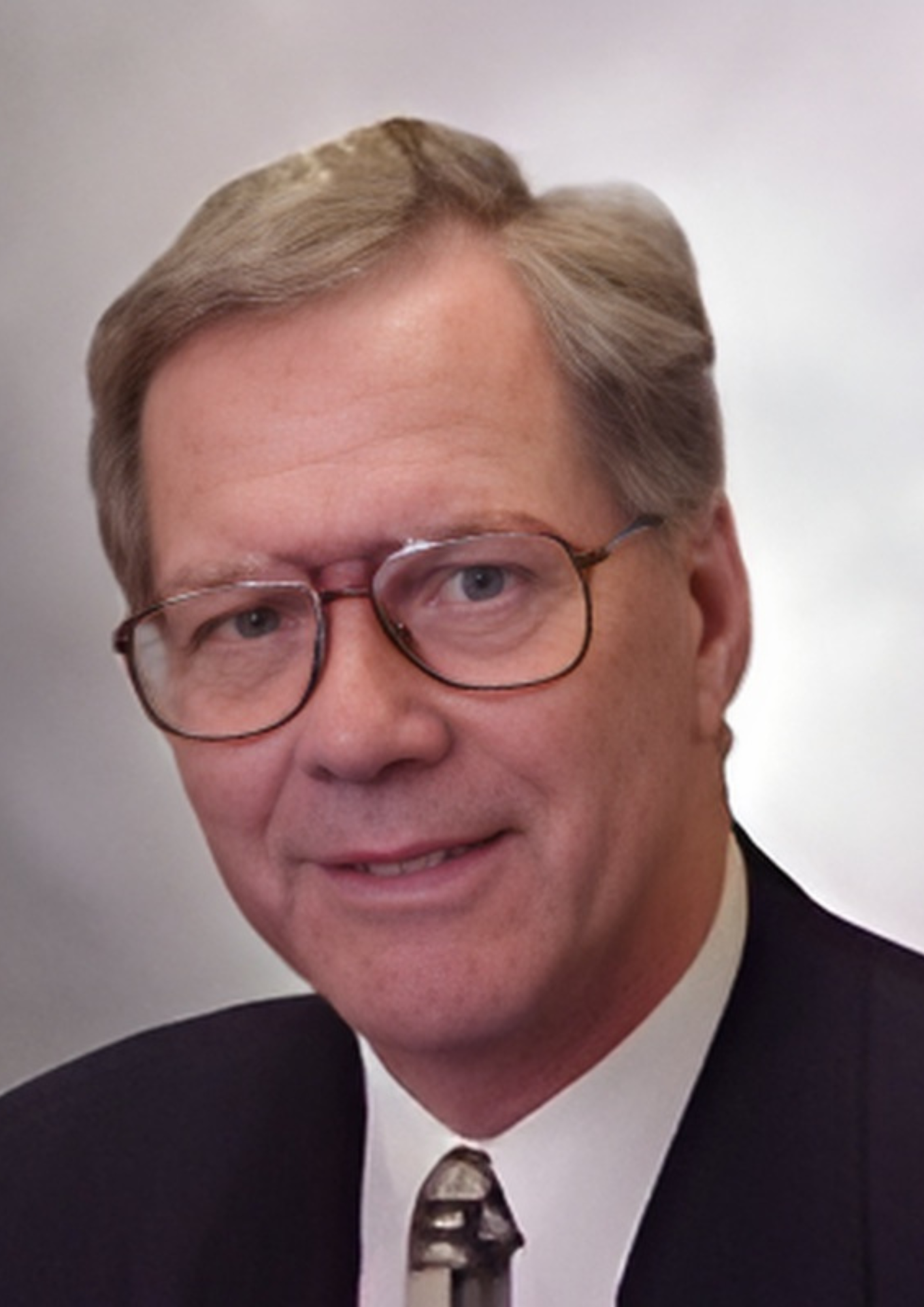
- Rob Kerin Dean Brown
- Date formed: 22 October 2001
- Date dissolved: 5 March 2002

People and organisations
- Monarch: Elizabeth II
- Governor: Eric Neal; Marjorie Jackson-Nelson
- Premier: Rob Kerin
- Deputy premier: Dean Brown
- No. of ministers: 13
- Member party: Liberal
- Status in legislature: Minority government
- Opposition party: Labor
- Opposition leader: Mike Rann

History
- Outgoing election: 9 February 2002
- Predecessor: Olsen ministry
- Successor: Rann ministry

The Kerin ministry (Liberal) was the 70th ministry of the Government of South Australia. It was led by the state's 43rd premier, Rob Kerin. The Kerin ministry succeeded the Olsen ministry on 22 October 2001, following John Olsen's resignation as premier and Liberal leader. The ministry was replaced by the Rann ministry on 5 March 2002 following the state election held on 9 February, which resulted in a hung parliament and the formation of a Labor minority government led by Mike Rann.

== Cabinet ==
Party	Portrait	Minister	Portfolio
Liberal		Rob Kerin (1954–) MP for Frome (1993-2008)	Premier; Leader of the South Australian Liberal Party; Minister for Multicultural Affairs; Member of Executive Council; Minister for Primary Industries and Resources (until 4 December 2001); Minister for Regional Development (until 4 December 2001); Minister for State Development (until 4 December 2001); Minister for Tourism (until 4 December 2001); Minister for State and Regional Development (from 4 December 2001)
Liberal		Dean Brown (1943–) MP for Finniss (1993–2006)	Deputy Premier; Deputy Leader of the South Australian Liberal Party; Minister for Disability Services (from 4 December 2001); Minister for the Ageing (from 4 December 2001)
Liberal		Rob Lucas (1953–) MLC (1982–2022)	Treasurer; Minister for Industry and Trade; Minister for Government Enterprises (from 4 December 2001)
Liberal		Trevor Griffin (1940–2015) MLC (1978–2002)	Attorney-General (until 4 December 2001); Deputy Leader of the Government in the Legislative Council (until 4 December 2001); Minister for Justice (until 4 December 2001); Minister for Consumer Affairs (until 4 December 2001)
Liberal		Diana Laidlaw (1951–) MLC (1982–2003)	Minister for Transport and Urban Planning; Minister for the Arts; Minister for the Status of Women
Liberal		Michael Armitage (1949–) MP for Adelaide (1989–2002)	Minister for Information Economy (until 4 December 2001); Minister for Government Enterprises (until 4 December 2001); Member of Executive Council (until 4 December 2001)
Liberal		Malcolm Buckby (1951–) MP for Light (1993–2006)	Minister for Education and Children's Services; Member of Executive Council
Liberal		Iain Evans (1959–) MP for Davenport (1993–2014)	Minister for Environment and Heritage; Member of Executive Council; Minister responsible for Volunteers (until 4 December 2001); Minister for Recreation, Sport and Racing (until 4 December 2001)
Liberal		Mark Brindal (1948–) MP for Unley (1993–2006)	Member of Executive Council; Minister for Employment and Training; Minister for Water Resources; Minister for Youth; Minister for Local Government (from 4 December 2001)
Liberal		Robert Brokenshire (1957–) MP for Mawson (1993–2006)	Minister for Gambling; Minister for Police, Correctional Services and Emergency Services; Minister for Volunteers (from 4 December 2001); Member of the Executive Council (from 25 October 2001)
Liberal		Wayne Matthew (1958–) MP for Bright (1989–2006)	Minister for Minerals and Energy; Minister Assisting the Deputy Premier (until 4 December 2001); Member of the Executive Council (from 25 October 2001)
Liberal		Robert Lawson (1944–) MLC (1993–2010)	Minister for Administrative and Information Services (until 4 December 2001); Minister for Workplace Relations (until 4 December 2001); Minister for Disability Services (until 4 December 2001); Minister for the Ageing (until 4 December 2001); Attorney-General (from 4 December 2001); Minister for Consumer Affairs (from 4 December 2001)
Liberal		Dorothy Kotz (1944–) MP for Newland (1989–2006)	Minister for Local Government (from 4 December 2001); Minister for Aboriginal Affairs (from 4 December 2001)
Liberal		Caroline Schaefer (1947–) MLC (1993–2010)	Minister for Primary Industries (from 4 December 2001)
Liberal		Martin Hamilton-Smith (1944–) MP for Waite (1997–2014)	Member of Executive Council (from 4 December 2001); Minister for Innovation (from 4 December 2001); Minister for Tourism (from 4 December 2001)

== Changes to the ministry ==
There was a ministry change in the Kerin government on 4 December 2001, which involved resignation from the posts by Trevor Griffin, who stepped down as the Attorney-General and Minister for Justice and Minister for Consumer Affairs; and Michael Armitage, who stepped down as Minister for Government Enterprises and Minister for Information Economy. The two ministers also stepped down from the Executive Council. In their place were Caroline Schaefer as the Minister for Primary Industries, and Martin Hamilton-Smith as Minister for Tourism and Minister for Innovation. Eric Meier was appointed as the Cabinet Secretary in place of Hamilton-Smith.

Kerin gave up both his Tourism and Primary Industries and Resources portfolios, while merging his State Development and Regional Development portfolios as Minister for State and Regional Development. Brown became the new minister of Ageing and Disability Services, Rob Lucas was given the role of Government Enterprises, Mark Brindal became Local Government Minister, while Robert Brokenshire was appointed as Minister for Volunteers.

Robert Lawson gave up his Disability Services, Ageing, Administrative and Information Services, and Workplace Relations portfolios and became Attorney-General, Minister for Consumer Affairs and Minister for Workplace Services. On the other hand, Dorothy Kotz relinquished her Local Government portfolio and became the Minister for Administrative and Information Services and Minister for Recreation, Sport and Racing. She was replacing Iain Evans who was the Minister for Recreation, Sport and Racing.

It also rearranged some portfolios. Primary Industries and Resources portfolio was split into Primary Industries and Minerals and Energy, the Information Economy portfolio was reassigned to Administrative and Information Services, and Workplace Relations became Workplace Services. The Justice portfolio was no more, having had its portfolio responsibility split among the Attorney-General and the Minister responsible for police, correctional services and emergency services.

== See also ==
- Cabinet of South Australia
