= Members of the South Australian House of Assembly, 2006–2010 =

This is a list of members of the South Australian House of Assembly from 2006 to 2010, as elected at the 2006 state election.

Name	Party	Electorate	Term of office
Hon Michael Atkinson	Labor	Croydon	1989–2018
Frances Bedford	Labor	Florey	1997–2022
Leon Bignell	Labor	Mawson	2006–2026
Lyn Breuer	Labor	Giles	1997–2014
Geoff Brock ^{[1]}	Independent	Frome	2009–present
Hon Paul Caica	Labor	Colton	2002–2018
Vickie Chapman	Liberal	Bragg	2002–2022
Vini Ciccarello	Labor	Norwood	1997–2010
Hon Patrick Conlon	Labor	Elder	1997–2014
Hon Iain Evans	Liberal	Davenport	1993–2014
Hon Kevin Foley	Labor	Port Adelaide	1993–2011
Chloë Fox	Labor	Bright	2006–2014
Robyn Geraghty	Labor	Torrens	1994–2014
Mark Goldsworthy	Liberal	Kavel	2002–2018
Steven Griffiths	Liberal	Goyder	2006–2018
Hon Graham Gunn	Liberal	Stuart	1970–2010
Martin Hamilton-Smith	Liberal	Waite	1997–2018
Kris Hanna	Independent	Mitchell	1997–2010
Hon John Hill	Labor	Kaurna	1997–2014
Tom Kenyon	Labor	Newland	2006–2018
Hon Rob Kerin ^{[1]}	Liberal	Frome	1993–2008
Hon Steph Key	Labor	Ashford	1997–2018
Tom Koutsantonis	Labor	West Torrens	1997–present
Hon Dr Jane Lomax-Smith	Labor	Adelaide	2002–2010
Hon Karlene Maywald	National	Chaffey	1997–2010
Hon Rory McEwen	Independent	Mount Gambier	1997–2010
Dr Duncan McFetridge	Liberal	Morphett	2002–2018
Michael O'Brien	Labor	Napier	2002–2014
Adrian Pederick	Liberal	Hammond	2006–2026
Liz Penfold	Liberal	Flinders	1993–2010
Michael Pengilly	Liberal	Finniss	2006–2018
Tony Piccolo	Labor	Light	2006–2026
David Pisoni	Liberal	Unley	2006–2026
Grace Portolesi	Labor	Hartley	2006–2014
Hon Jennifer Rankine	Labor	Wright	1997–2018
Hon Mike Rann	Labor	Ramsay	1985–2012
John Rau	Labor	Enfield	2002–2018
Isobel Redmond	Liberal	Heysen	2002–2018
Lindsay Simmons	Labor	Morialta	2006–2010
Hon Jack Snelling	Labor	Playford	1997–2018
Hon Lea Stevens	Labor	Little Para	1994–2010
Hon Dr Bob Such	Independent	Fisher	1989–2014
Gay Thompson	Labor	Reynell	1997–2014
Ivan Venning	Liberal	Schubert	1990–2014
Hon Jay Weatherill	Labor	Cheltenham	2002–2018
Hon Trish White	Labor	Taylor	1994–2010
Mitch Williams	Liberal	MacKillop	1997–2018
Hon Michael Wright	Labor	Lee	1997–2014

^{1} The Liberal member for Frome, Rob Kerin, resigned on 11 November 2008. Independent candidate Geoff Brock won the resulting by-election held on 17 January 2009.
