= Rob Lucas =

Australian politician

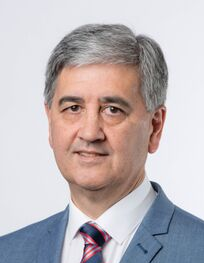

Treasurer of South Australia
- In office 19 March 2018 – 21 March 2022
- Premier: Steven Marshall
- Preceded by: Tom Koutsantonis
- Succeeded by: Stephen Mullighan
- In office 20 October 1997 – 5 March 2002
- Premier: John Olsen (1997–2001); Rob Kerin (2001–2002)
- Preceded by: Stephen Baker
- Succeeded by: Kevin Foley

Father of the Parliament of South Australia
- In office 20 March 2010 – 19 March 2022
- Preceded by: Graham Gunn
- Succeeded by: Tom Koutsantonis

Leader of the Government in the Legislative Council
- In office 22 March 2018 – 21 March 2022
- Premier: Steven Marshall
- Preceded by: Kyam Maher
- Succeeded by: Kyam Maher
- In office 14 February 1993 – 5 March 2002
- Premier: Dean Brown (1993–1996); John Olsen (1996–2001); Rob Kerin (2001–2002)
- Succeeded by: Paul Holloway

Minister for Government Enterprises
- In office 4 December 2001 – 5 March 2002
- Premier: Rob Kerin
- Preceded by: Iain Evans
- Succeeded by: Kevin Foley

Minister for Industry & Trade
- In office 14 February 2000 – 5 March 2002
- Premier: John Olsen (2000–2001); Rob Kerin (2001–2002)
- Preceded by: Iain Evans
- Succeeded by: Kevin Foley

Minister for Education and Children's Services
- In office 14 December 1993 – 20 October 1997
- Premier: Dean Brown
- Preceded by: Susan Lenehan
- Succeeded by: Malcolm Buckby

Member of the Legislative Council of South Australia
- In office 6 November 1982 – 19 March 2022

Personal details
- Born: Robert Ivan Lucas; 7 June 1953 (age 73) Kure, Hiroshima, Japan
- Party: Liberal Party of Australia (SA)
- Education: University of Adelaide

Robert Ivan Lucas (born 7 June 1953) is an Australian former politician and a former member of the South Australian Legislative Council between the 1982 election and the 2022 election, representing the South Australian Division of the Liberal Party of Australia.

Lucas served as the Treasurer of South Australia between 2018 and 2022 in the Marshall government, and previously served in the role between 1997 and 2002 in the Olsen and Kerin governments. Lucas was the Father of the Parliament until his retirement at the 2022 election.

== Career ==
Before his entry into politics, Lucas graduated from the University of Adelaide with a Bachelor of Science, a Bachelor of Economics, and an MBA.

In office, Lucas has been a Minister for Education and Children's Services, Minister for Industry and Trade and Minister for Government Enterprises. He also served as Treasurer from the 1997 election until his party's defeat at the 2002 election. During this time, 1993 to 2002, he was the Leader of the Government in the Legislative Council.

The appointment of Lucas, a member of the upper house Legislative Council, as Treasurer was a break in convention as previous Treasurers had been members of the lower house the House of Assembly. The precedence in appointing a member of the upper house as Treasurer was in New South Wales with the appointment of Michael Egan in 1995.

From 2002 until April 2007, Lucas served as Shadow Treasurer, Shadow Minister for Industry and Trade and Police, and between 2005 and 2006 was also Shadow Minister for Economic Development and Science and Information Economy. During this time (2002 to 2007), Lucas was the Leader of the Opposition in the Legislative Council.

In 2014, Lucas returned to the Treasury portfolio albeit as Shadow Treasurer, following the retirement of the previous portfolio holder and former Liberal leader Iain Evans. He became treasurer and Leader of the Government in the Legislative Council again on 19 March 2018 following his party winning government at the 2018 election.

Two days after the election, he announced on 19 March 2018 that he would be serving his final term in parliament, with an intention to leave parliament at the 2022 election.

== Personal life ==
Lucas's mother Yoshiko was a "war bride" who met his father, Bob, who was part of the British Commonwealth Occupation Force in Japan.

South Australian Legislative Council
Preceded by John Carnie	Member of the Legislative Council; 1982–2022; Served alongside: Multiple Members	Next: TBD
Preceded by Boyd Dawkins	Member of the Legislative Council; 1982–2022; Served alongside: Multiple Members	
Preceded by Norm Foster	Member of the Legislative Council; 1982–2022; Served alongside: Multiple Members	
Preceded by Don Laidlaw	Member of the Legislative Council; 1982–2022; Served alongside: Multiple Members	
Political offices
Preceded by	Leader of the Government in the South Australian Legislative Council; 1993–2002	Succeeded by Paul Holloway
Preceded by Susan Lenehan	Minister for Education and Children's Services; 1993–1997	Succeeded by Malcolm Buckby
Preceded by Stephen Baker	Treasurer of South Australia; 1997–2002	Succeeded by Kevin Foley
Preceded by Iain Evans	Minister for Industry & Trade; 2000–2002	Succeeded by Kevin Foley
Preceded by Iain Evans	Minister for Government Enterprises; 2001–2002	Succeeded by Kevin Foley
Preceded by Graham Gunn	Father of the Parliament of South Australia; 2010–2022	Succeeded by Tom Koutsantonis
Preceded by Tom Koutsantonis	Treasurer of South Australia; 2018–2022	Succeeded by Stephen Mullighan
Preceded by Kyam Maher	Leader of the Government in the South Australian Legislative Council; 2018–2022	Succeeded by Kyam Maher
