= 2009 Frome state by-election =

- 17 January 2009

Electoral district of Frome in the South Australian House of Assembly

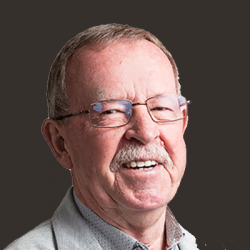
	First party	Second party	Third party
Candidate	Terry Boylan	John Rohde	Geoff Brock
Party	Liberal	Labor	Independent
Primary vote	7,576	5,041	4,557
Percentage	39.24%	26.11%	23.60%
Swing	▼8.86	▼14.93	▲23.60
TCP	48.28%		51.72%
TCP swing	▼5.13		▲51.72
MP before election
Rob Kerin
Liberal
Elected MP
Geoff Brock
Independent

A by-election was held for the South Australian House of Assembly seat of Frome on 17 January 2009. This was triggered by the resignation of former premier and state Liberal MHA Rob Kerin. The seat had been retained by the Liberals at the 2006 state election on a 3.4 per cent margin, and at the 2002 state election on an 11.5 per cent margin.

The writ for the by-election was issued on 28 November, with the rolls closing on 8 December. Candidate nominations closed 18 December at midday.

Independent candidate Geoff Brock ended up winning the seat from the Liberals in a very close contest.

== Background ==
Kerin was first elected as the member for the new rural Port Pirie-based seat of Frome at the 1993 state election where the Liberals won government. From 1995 he held various ministries in the Brown and Olsen Liberal governments until he became Premier of South Australia in October 2001, before losing government to the Mike Rann-led Labor Party at the March 2002 state election. Kerin remained Liberal leader until after the 2006 state election when he resigned the leadership to make way for Iain Evans.

The state by-election was the first to be held since the 1994 Taylor by-election, when another former premier, Lynn Arnold, retired from politics.

== Candidates ==
6 candidates in ballot paper order
Labor Party	John Rohde	Postal worker
Nationals SA	Neville Wilson	Deputy mayor of Port Pirie Regional Council
Liberal Party	Terry Boylan	Police officer
Greens	Joy O'Brien	Former librarian and Burnside councillor
One Nation	Peter Fitzpatrick	Small business contractor
Independent Your Voice	Geoff Brock	Mayor of Port Pirie Regional Council

The Family First Party and the Australian Democrats, who ran candidates in the previous election, polling 5.2 percent and 2 percent respectively, did not nominate a candidate to contest the by-election.

== Issues ==
Of concern to the electorate was the potential closure of the Nyrstar smelter in Port Pirie due to the federal government's emissions trading scheme known as the Carbon Pollution Reduction Scheme, however it won special exemption from the scheme on 17 December.

Port Pirie mayor and independent candidate Geoff Brock was considered a possibility for winning the seat, with a strong local profile, and receiving preference recommendations in how-to-vote cards (HTVs) from Labor and the Nationals, whilst the Greens did not recommend preferences. Brock's own HTV recommended preferences to the Nationals, Labor, Liberal, Green, and One Nation, in that order. Independent senator Nick Xenophon also campaigned for Brock.

== Results ==
The by-election was closely contested, with the result being uncertain for over a week. Initial reports suggested a slight swing to the Liberals on the two-party preferred count against Labor, but with Independent candidate Geoff Brock not far behind Labor. By 21 January 2009, both the ABC's Antony Green and the State Electoral Office were indicating a two percent swing against the Liberals toward Labor, but not enough to lose the seat. Liberal leader Martin Hamilton-Smith claimed victory on behalf of the party.

Frome state by-election, 17 January 2009
Party	Candidate	Votes	%	±%
Liberal	Terry Boylan	7,576	39.24	–8.86
Labor	John Rohde	5,041	26.11	–14.93
Independent Your Voice	Geoff Brock	4,557	23.60	+23.60
National	Neville Wilson	1,267	6.56	+6.56
Greens	Joy O'Brien	734	3.80	+0.06
One Nation	Peter Fitzpatrick	134	0.69	+0.69
Total formal votes		19,309	97.12	+0.21
Informal votes		573	2.88	–0.21
Turnout		19,882	89.79	–4.44
Notional two-party-preferred count
Liberal	Terry Boylan	9,976	51.67	–1.74
Labor	John Rohde	9,333	48.33	+1.74
Two-candidate-preferred result
Independent Your Voice	Geoff Brock	9,987	51.72	+51.72
Liberal	Terry Boylan	9,322	48.28	–5.13
Independent gain from Liberal		Swing	N/A	

Instant-runoff voting method.

The result hinged on the performance of Brock against Labor in the competition for second place. Brock polled best in the Port Pirie area, and received enough eliminated candidate preferences to end up ahead of the Labor candidate by 30 votes.

Distribution of preferences - 4th count
Party	Candidate	Votes	%	±%
Liberal	Terry Boylan	8,215	42.54	
Independent Your Voice	Geoff Brock	5,562	28.81	
Labor	John Rohde	5,532	28.65	

Brock received 80 percent of Labor's fifth count preferences to achieve a two-candidate preferred vote of 51.72 percent (a majority of 665 votes) against the Liberals, despite a slight improvement in the Liberal primary vote since the previous count. This was announced by the Electoral Commissioner, Kay Mousley, at 8:30 pm local time on 24 January 2009, but without a formal declaration. The commissioner rejected a request for a recount by Boylan, with a formal request being lodged by the Liberals, which was also rejected, after which the Liberals ruled out a possibility of taking the result to the Court of Disputed Returns. A formal declaration of the by-election outcome was made by the State Electoral Office on 29 January. The by-election saw a rare two-party swing to an incumbent government, and was the first time an opposition had lost a seat at a by-election in South Australia. The result in Frome at the 2010 state election saw Brock increase his primary vote by 14.1 percent to a total of 37.7 percent and his two-candidate vote by 6.5 percent to a total of 58.2 percent. Despite a statewide swing against Labor at the election, Labor again increased its two-party vote in Frome by 1.8 percent to a total of 50.1 percent, coincidentally by 30 votes.

== See also ==
- List of South Australian House of Assembly by-elections
