= Electoral results for the district of Waite =

District election results

This is a list of electoral results for the Electoral district of Waite in South Australian state elections.

== Members for Waite ==
Member	Party	Term
Stephen Baker	Liberal	1993–1997
Martin Hamilton-Smith	Liberal	1997–2014
Martin Hamilton-Smith	Independent	2014–2018
Sam Duluk	Liberal	2018–2020
Sam Duluk	Independent	2020-2022
Catherine Hutchesson	Labor	2022–present

== Election results ==
=== Elections in the 2020s ===
==== 2026 ====
2026 South Australian state election: Waite
Party	Candidate	Votes	%	±%
Labor	Catherine Hutchesson	12,742	49.3	+22.7
Liberal	Frank Pangallo	4,769	18.4	−7.4
Greens	Declan Brumfield	4,199	16.2	+4.8
One Nation	Aaron von Frattner	3,070	11.9	+11.9
Independent	Alec Gargett	751	2.9	+2.9
Australian Family	Ross Pawley	259	1.0	+1.0
Fair Go	Mark Ruta	61	0.2	+0.2
Total formal votes		25,851	97.6	±0.0
Informal votes		633	2.4	±0.0
Turnout		26,484	92.8	+0.2
Two-candidate-preferred result
Labor	Catherine Hutchesson	18,012	69.7	+15.7
Liberal	Frank Pangallo	7,839	30.3	−15.7
Labor hold		Swing	+15.7	

==== 2022 ====
2022 South Australian state election: Waite
Party	Candidate	Votes	%	±%
Labor	Catherine Hutchesson	6,698	26.6	+2.5
Liberal	Alexander Hyde	6,509	25.8	−18.7
Independent	Sam Duluk	4,949	19.7	+19.7
Independent	Heather Holmes-Ross	3,665	14.6	+14.6
Greens	Brendan White	2,872	11.4	+0.9
Animal Justice	Ben Freeling	482	1.9	+1.9
Total formal votes		25,175	97.6	
Informal votes		607	2.4	
Turnout		25,782	92.6	
Two-party-preferred result
Labor	Catherine Hutchesson	13,597	54.0	+11.4
Liberal	Alexander Hyde	11,578	46.0	−11.4
Labor gain from Liberal		Swing	+11.4	

Distribution of preferences: Waite
Party	Candidate	Votes	Round 1		Round 2		Round 3		Round 4	
Party	Candidate	Votes	Dist.	Total	Dist.	Total	Dist.	Total	Dist.	Total
Quota (50% + 1)		12,588								
Labor	Catherine Hutchesson	6,698	+65	6,763	+1,321	8,084	+3,281	11,365	+2,232	13,597
Liberal	Alexander Hyde	6,509	+42	6,551	+152	6,703	+652	7,355	4,223	11,578
Independent	Sam Duluk	4,949	+81	5,030	+252	5,282	+1,173	6,455	Excluded	
Independent	Heather Holmes-Ross	3,665	+109	3,774	+1,332	5,106	Excluded			
Greens	Brendan White	2,872	+185	3,057	Excluded					
Animal Justice	Ben Freeling	482	Excluded							

=== Elections in the 2010s ===
==== 2018 ====
2018 South Australian state election: Waite
Party	Candidate	Votes	%	±%
Liberal	Sam Duluk	11,115	45.2	−8.0
Labor	Catherine Hutchesson	5,783	23.5	−2.6
SA-Best	Graham Davies	3,870	15.7	+15.7
Greens	Brendan White	2,607	10.6	−5.0
Conservatives	John Duncan	677	2.8	−1.0
Dignity	Cathi Tucker	533	2.2	+0.9
Total formal votes		24,585	97.6	−0.3
Informal votes		596	2.4	+0.3
Turnout		25,181	92.7	+2.3
Two-party-preferred result
Liberal	Sam Duluk	14,211	57.8	−2.3
Labor	Catherine Hutchesson	10,374	42.2	+2.3
Liberal hold		Swing	−2.3	

2014 South Australian state election: Waite
Party	Candidate	Votes	%	±%
Liberal	Martin Hamilton-Smith	12,585	54.8	−0.1
Labor	Rebekah Huppatz	6,239	27.1	−1.3
Greens	Simon Hope	2,639	11.5	−1.4
Family First	Steve Edmonds	868	3.8	+0.5
Dignity for Disability	Cathi Tucker	652	2.8	+2.8
Total formal votes		22,983	97.6	−0.4
Informal votes		575	2.4	+0.4
Turnout		23,558	92.8	−0.3
Two-party-preferred result
Liberal	Martin Hamilton-Smith	14,106	61.4	−0.7
Labor	Rebekah Huppatz	8,877	38.6	+0.7
Liberal hold		Swing	−0.7	

2010 South Australian state election: Waite
Party	Candidate	Votes	%	±%
Liberal	Martin Hamilton-Smith	12,166	56.1	+9.1
Labor	Adrian Tisato	5,997	27.6	−6.0
Greens	Matt Wilson	2,899	13.4	+2.8
Family First	John Vottari	631	2.9	−1.3
Total formal votes		21,693	97.8	
Informal votes		455	2.2	
Turnout		22,148	93.07	
Two-party-preferred result
Liberal	Martin Hamilton-Smith	13,636	62.9	+8.8
Labor	Adrian Tisato	8,057	37.1	−8.8
Liberal hold		Swing	+8.8	

=== Elections in the 2000s ===
2006 South Australian state election: Waite
Party	Candidate	Votes	%	±%
Liberal	Martin Hamilton-Smith	9,876	47.0	−6.0
Labor	Diana Gibbs-Ludbrook	7,078	33.7	+9.6
Greens	Zane Young	2,222	10.6	+5.3
Democrats	Simon Regan	957	4.6	−7.7
Family First	John Queale	895	4.3	+1.3
Total formal votes		21,028	97.5	+0.0
Informal votes		546	2.5	+0.0
Turnout		21,574	91.4	−1.7
Two-party-preferred result
Liberal	Martin Hamilton-Smith	11,362	54.0	−8.0
Labor	Diana Gibbs-Ludbrook	9,666	46.0	+8.0
Liberal hold		Swing	−8.0	

2002 South Australian state election: Waite
Party	Candidate	Votes	%	±%
Liberal	Martin Hamilton-Smith	11,018	53.0	+2.2
Labor	Mark Hancock	5,007	24.1	+0.5
Democrats	Stephen Spence	2,552	12.3	−11.2
Greens	Michael Pritchard	1,109	5.3	+5.3
Family First	Thea Hennessey	624	3.0	+3.0
SA First	Chris Alford	273	1.3	+1.3
One Nation	Hazel Nicholls	221	1.1	+1.1
Total formal votes		20,804	97.5	
Informal votes		540	2.5	
Turnout		21,344	93.1	
Two-party-preferred result
Liberal	Martin Hamilton-Smith	12,897	62.0	+7.2
Labor	Mark Hancock	7,907	38.0	+38.0
Liberal hold		Swing	N/A	

=== Elections in the 1990s ===
1997 South Australian state election: Waite
Party	Candidate	Votes	%	±%
Liberal	Martin Hamilton-Smith	9,899	52.4	−11.1
Democrats	Don Gilbert	4,592	24.3	+6.2
Labor	Sara Cochrane	4,394	23.3	+7.6
Total formal votes		18,885	96.6	−0.5
Informal votes		658	3.4	+0.5
Turnout		19,543	90.5	
Two-party-preferred result
Liberal	Martin Hamilton-Smith	11,751	62.2	−12.1
Labor	Sara Cochrane	7,134	37.8	+12.1
Two-candidate-preferred result
Liberal	Martin Hamilton-Smith	10,550	55.9	−17.4
Democrats	Don Gilbert	8,335	44.1	+17.4
Liberal hold		Swing	−17.4	

1993 South Australian state election: Waite
Party	Candidate	Votes	%	±%
Liberal	Stephen Baker	12,622	63.1	+6.3
Democrats	Judith Barr	3,632	18.2	+4.6
Labor	Geoffrey Phillips	3,195	16.0	−13.5
Natural Law	Anne Davidson	209	1.0	+1.0
Independent	David Bidstrup	205	1.0	+1.0
Independent	Neil Worrall	132	0.7	+0.7
Total formal votes		19,995	97.1	−1.0
Informal votes		595	2.9	+1.0
Turnout		20,590	92.4	
Two-party-preferred result
Liberal	Stephen Baker	14,777	73.9	+11.0
Labor	Geoffrey Phillips	5,218	26.1	−11.0
Two-candidate-preferred result
Liberal	Stephen Baker	14,654	73.3	+10.4
Democrats	Judith Barr	5,341	26.7	+26.7
Liberal hold		Swing	N/A	
