= Rob Kerin =

Australian politician (born 1954)

The Honourable Rob Kerin AO
- Kerin in 2026

43rd Premier of South Australia
- In office 22 October 2001 – 5 March 2002
- Monarch: Elizabeth II
- Governor: Eric Neal; Marjorie Jackson-Nelson
- Deputy: Dean Brown
- Preceded by: John Olsen
- Succeeded by: Mike Rann

Deputy Premier of South Australia
- In office 7 July 1998 – 22 October 2001
- Premier: John Olsen
- Preceded by: Graham Ingerson
- Succeeded by: Dean Brown

Leader of the Opposition in South Australia
- In office 5 March 2002 – 29 March 2006
- Deputy: Dean Brown; Iain Evans
- Preceded by: Mike Rann
- Succeeded by: Iain Evans
Party leadership
Leader of the South Australian Liberal Party
In office 22 October 2001 – 29 March 2006
Deputy	Dean Brown; Iain Evans
Preceded by	John Olsen
Succeeded by	Iain Evans
Deputy Leader of the South Australian Liberal Party
In office 7 July 1998 – 22 October 2001
Leader	John Olsen
Preceded by	Graham Ingerson
Succeeded by	Dean Brown

Member of the South Australian Parliament for Frome
- In office 11 December 1993 – 12 November 2008
- Preceded by: Constituency established
- Succeeded by: Geoff Brock

Personal details
- Born: Robert Gerard Kerin; 4 January 1954 (age 72) Crystal Brook, South Australia, Australia
- Party: Liberal
- Spouse: Cathy
- Children: 4
- Education: Sacred Heart College; University of Adelaide (BA)
- Occupation: Businessman; politician

Robert Gerard Kerin (born 4 January 1954) is an Australian businessman and former politician who represented the South Australian branch of the Liberal Party of Australia. He was Premier of South Australia from 2001 to 2002 and as Leader of the Opposition from 2002 to 2006.

Kerin grew up in Crystal Brook, South Australia, and attended the University of Adelaide. He worked on his family business in agriculture before entering politics. Following the 1993 election, Kerin entered parliament as the Liberal member for Frome. He was appointed Minister for Primary Industries in the government of Dean Brown in 1995 and became Deputy Premier in the government of John Olsen in 1998. After Olsen resigned in 2001, Kerin defeated Brown in a Liberal leadership spill to become the new Premier.

Kerin was the led the Liberals through the 2002 state election where a hung parliament emerged. While his party received a majority of the state-wide two-party preferred vote, Mike Rann, the Labor leader, succeeded in gaining the endorsement of the independent Peter Lewis. Kerin continued as premier until his government was defeated in a parliamentary confidence motion. He then took the position as opposition leader. He resigned as the leader of the Liberals following their defeat in the 2006 election, and retired from parliament in November 2008. Since leaving politics, Kerin has had leadership roles in organisations such as the Adelaide Oval Stadium Management Authority and the South Australian Football Commission.

== Early life and education ==
Robert Gerard Kerin was born on 4 January 1954, and brought up in Crystal Brook, South Australia. He was one of eight children of Maurice and Molly Kerin. Kerin went to the convent school in the same area and then to Sacred Heart College in Adelaide, where he attained a Bachelor of Arts degree and a Diploma in Education at the University of Adelaide.

== Business career ==
Kerin prior to joining politics worked as managing director of his family business, Kerin Agencies. His business produce agricultural chemicals in Crystal Brook. Kerin inherited the firm from his father where he provided advice to farmers on how to use chemicals and weed management. According to one of Ivan Venning's speeches in parliament in 2001, the company had expanded from small offices to larger ones and warehouses with Kerin being involved in arranging training on chemical accreditation to farmers. He made sure that his younger brother, Peter, took over the business before Kerin ran for office in 1993.

== Political career ==
=== Brown government (1993–1996) ===
Kerin became a member of the South Australian Legislative Assembly on 11 December 1993 when he was elected as a Liberal candidate for the electorate of Frome in Port Pirie. The electorate of Frome was recreated in 1993 as a result of splitting the former electorate of Stuart, which comprised both Port Pirie and Port Augusta. In his speech delivered on 17 February 1994 in the parliament, Kerin acknowledged the encouragement of Lindsay Graham, a local Liberal organiser.

Between 1 July 1994 and 6 February 1996, Kerin worked as the Member of the Public Works Committee to examine various public infrastructure projects and facilities. While debating on 12 October 1995, he supported the Darlington Police Complex proposal and also made demands for improved conditions for policemen's safety and comfort based on committee visits to Darlington and Port Augusta.

Kerin joined the cabinet of Premier Dean Brown in December 1995 as the Minister for Primary Industries, roughly two years after being elected. In late 1996, after appeals of South Australian beekeepers, Kerin started a two-year inquiry by the Apiary Industry Task Force into disease management in honeybees, such as American foulbrood.

=== Olsen government (1996–2001) ===
In the government led by Premier John Olsen, Kerin was appointed Minister Assisting for Regional Development and Small Business on 12 December 1996, while continuing as the Minister for Primary Industries. In addition, he was appointed Minister for Primary Industries, Natural Resources and Regional Development on 20 October 1997. Later that year, on 10 November, the Olsen cabinet agreed to Kerin's suggestion of establishing the Aquaculture Industry Lease Rehabilitation Fund, where the fund would consist of contributions made by aquaculture lease holders and would pay for the costs incurred in the rehabilitation of abandoned sites, thus overcoming an issue in issuing leases.

Kerin succeeded Graham Ingerson as the Deputy Premier on 7 July 1998, working together with Olsen but keeping his ministerial positions. On 9 December 1999, he held three portfolios; namely Primary Industries, Minerals and Energy and Regional Development. On 14 February 2000, Kerin was appointed as Minister for Primary Industries and Resources, while also being Deputy Premier and Minister for Regional Development. He had responsibility in implementing the Petroleum Act 2000 which classified the Cooper Basin and Otway Basin as highly prospective.

=== Premiership (2001–2002) ===
Kerin became the Premier on 22 October 2001, succeeding Olsen after his resignation due to the report produced by the Clayton Commission, which indicated that Olsen provided false evidence regarding a 1994 deal with Motorola. Kerin won the Liberal leadership ballot contesting against the previous premier Brown with a score of 13 to 9, Brown becoming the deputy in the Kerin ministry. Though he had shown little enthusiasm about being the premier, party unity and economic growth were his focus. Kerin took the portfolios of State Development, Tourism and Multicultural Affairs. On 4 December 2001, Kerin gave up Tourism and Primary Industries and Resources.

Kerin was at the helm of the Liberals during the 9 February 2002 state election as the party contested for a third term in power. The prime minister of Australia, John Howard, supported him during his campaign and attended his election rally on 27 January 2002 in Adelaide. The result was a hung parliament whereby the Labor Party of Mike Rann won 23 seats, while the Liberals won 20 seats and the last four were won by the three independents and one National Party member. Though the Liberals won 50.9% two-party-preferred vote in the state, they failed to win 24 seats. Kerin retained Frome on an 8.3-percentage-point swing to the Liberals. Rann secured the endorsement of conservative independent Peter Lewis via a deal where Lewis would take up the position of Speaker. Kerin was able to retain his position as premier and had the agreement tested in the House of Assembly.

Kerin then nominated the independent member Rory McEwen for Speaker, but Lewis won the election with 25 votes to 22 when parliament convened on 5 March 2002. Following this, he put forward a motion of confidence in his government, pointing out that the Liberals had won a majority of the two-party-preferred vote statewide, and the constituents of Lewis's electorate had been expecting him to be on side with a Liberal government. This motion was voted down by 23 votes to 22, with independent Bob Such voting 'present' and Lewis acting as Speaker. Kerin promptly resigned as premier, and Mike Rann formed a Labor government.

=== Leader of the Opposition (2002–2006) ===
Composition of the House of Assembly following the 2002 election

Following the loss of the premiership in March 2002, Kerin continued as SA Liberal Party Leader and Leader of the Opposition, continuing to represent Frome under the Rann government. His tenure as party leader was marked by difficulties within the party itself, including a possible challenge to his leadership from Martin Hamilton-Smith, a frontbencher, in October 2005.

As part of the election campaign in 2006, Kerin emphasised issues surrounding the economy, infrastructure, health care, and education. The liberal agenda included cuts to land taxes, funding for private schools, hiring more policemen, and increased mental health services. He attacked the Rann government on their approach to taxation and suggested that South Australia had not enjoyed enough from the growth in the national economy.

Labor claimed 28 of 47 seats in the 18 March 2006 election, whereas the Liberals claimed 15 seats and 43.2 per cent of the statewide two-party-preferred vote. Kerin held onto Frome, which became a marginal seat again, but stepped down as Opposition Leader after the election. Iain Evans became his successor on 30 March 2006, with Vickie Chapman as Deputy Leader.

Kerin then acted as a backbencher. He was on the Statutory Officers Committee from 2 May 2006 to 13 November 2008 and Penola Pulp Mill Authorisation Bill committee from 30 May to 5 September 2007. In April 2007, he announced that he would not stand for re-election in 2010, thus joining Robert Lawson, Caroline Schaefer, and Liz Penfold in preparing to exit parliament. This move allowed Hamilton-Smith, now the Liberal Party leader, to have more flexibility to reorganise his party's front bench. Kerin announced his decision to retire from politics prematurely on 11 November 2008 due to fatigue and the need for a change after spending almost 15 years in politics. His resignation from the parliament became effective on the following day. In the resultant January 2009 By-Election of Frome, independent Geoff Brock, the mayor of Port Pirie won the seat.

== Post-parliamentary career ==
Kerin was nominated by the Rann government in April 2009 to manage the South Australian government's move into the Regional Development Australia network that amalgamated regional development organisations with the federal area consultative committee. After this, he chaired Regional Development South Australia and was also on the board of Regional Australia Institute. With Rob Kerin Consulting, he carried out restructuring activities with regional development organisations, South Australian Farmers Federation, and Viterra.

Kerin served as the first executive chair of Primary Producers SA from its formation in 2013 until 2021. This organisation was formed to merge the leading agricultural industry associations of South Australia due to the disbandment of the South Australian Farmers Federation. Kerin was the director of Community Football League from 2014 to 2020.

In 2015, Kerin became a member of the board of Variety – The Children's Charity of South Australia. He served as deputy chairman in 2016 to 2017 and chairman from 2018 to 2019. Kerin was also serving on its Governance and Audit Committee from 2016 to 2019. He chaired the South Australian Rock Lobster Advisory Council from about 2015. From 2018 to 2024, Kerin chaired the South Australian Oyster Growers Association and Oyster Research Council.

Adelaide Oval in February 2023, during Kerin's chairmanship

In 2020, Kerin was a chairman of the Portalis Project SA – Cape Hardy Stage 1 Port Project. In that year, he succeeded Olsen once again by becoming the chairman of the South Australian Football Commission until March 2026. From 2022 to 2026, he also chaired the Adelaide Oval Stadium Management Authority and Adelaide Oval Hotel Trust. In 2023, he became a member of the People and Culture Committee of Variety SA.

As of 2026, Kerin is the chairman of Regional Development South Australia and the South Australian Rock Lobster Advisory Council, a board member of the Regional Australia Institute, SADA Fresh, and Variety SA, and the managing director of Rob Kerin Consulting. His other business appointments were membership of the Monopoly Property Group Advisory Board.

== Honours and awards ==
The Centenary Medal was conferred on Kerin on 1 January 2001. The entitlement for him to be titled "The Honourable" was published in the gazette on 2 May 2002. Kerin was listed by The Advertiser as one of their top fifty most influential people in South Australian footy in December 2020. In March 2026, he was made an SANFL League Life Member as part of the 2025 life members of the league. On the occasion of the 2026 King's Birthday Honours, he was appointed an Officer of the Order of Australia (AO) for his services in parliament and economic development.

== Personal life ==
Kerin is married to Cathy, and together they have four daughters named Lauren, Hayley, Caitlin, and Hannah. He used to play Australian rules football and served as President of Crystal Brook Football Club.

Political offices
Preceded by John Olsen	Premier of South Australia; 2001 – 2002	Succeeded by Mike Rann
Preceded by Graham Ingerson	Deputy Premier of South Australia; 1998 – 2001	Succeeded by Dean Brown
Preceded by Mike Rann	Leader of the Opposition in South Australia; 2002 – 2006	Succeeded by Iain Evans
Parliament of South Australia
New division	Member for Frome; 1993 – 2008	Succeeded by Geoff Brock
Party political offices
Preceded by John Olsen	Leader of the Liberal Party of Australia (South Australian Division); 2001 – 2006	Succeeded by Iain Evans
