= Trevor Griffin (politician) =

Australian politician

44th Attorney-General of South Australia
- In office 17 September 1979 – 10 November 1982
- Premier: David Tonkin
- Preceded by: Chris Sumner
- Succeeded by: Chris Sumner
- In office 14 December 1993 – 4 December 2001
- Premier: Dean Brown (1993–1996); John Olsen (1996–2001)
- Preceded by: Chris Sumner
- Succeeded by: Robert Lawson

Personal details
- Born: Kenneth Trevor Griffin; 14 September 1940
- Died: 7 March 2015 (aged 74) Adelaide, South Australia
- Party: Liberal Party
- Education: University of Adelaide
- Profession: Lawyer

Kenneth Trevor Griffin (14 September 1940 – 7 March 2015) was an Australian politician. He was a Liberal member of the South Australian Legislative Council from 1978 to 2002, when he retired from politics. He led the Liberal Party in the Council from 1979 to 1982 and was deputy leader from 1982 to 2001. He also served as 44th Attorney-General of South Australia from 1979 to 1982 and from 1993 to 2001. After retiring from politics he became a wine maker.

Griffin died in Adelaide on 7 March 2015, and was buried privately.

Political offices
Preceded by Chris Sumner	Attorney-General of South Australia; 1979–1982	Succeeded by Chris Sumner
Preceded by Chris Sumner	Attorney-General of South Australia; 1993–2001	Succeeded by Robert Lawson
