= Deputy Premier of South Australia =

South Australian deputy head of government (1968, 1970–)

- South Australian Coat of Arms

- Flag of South Australia

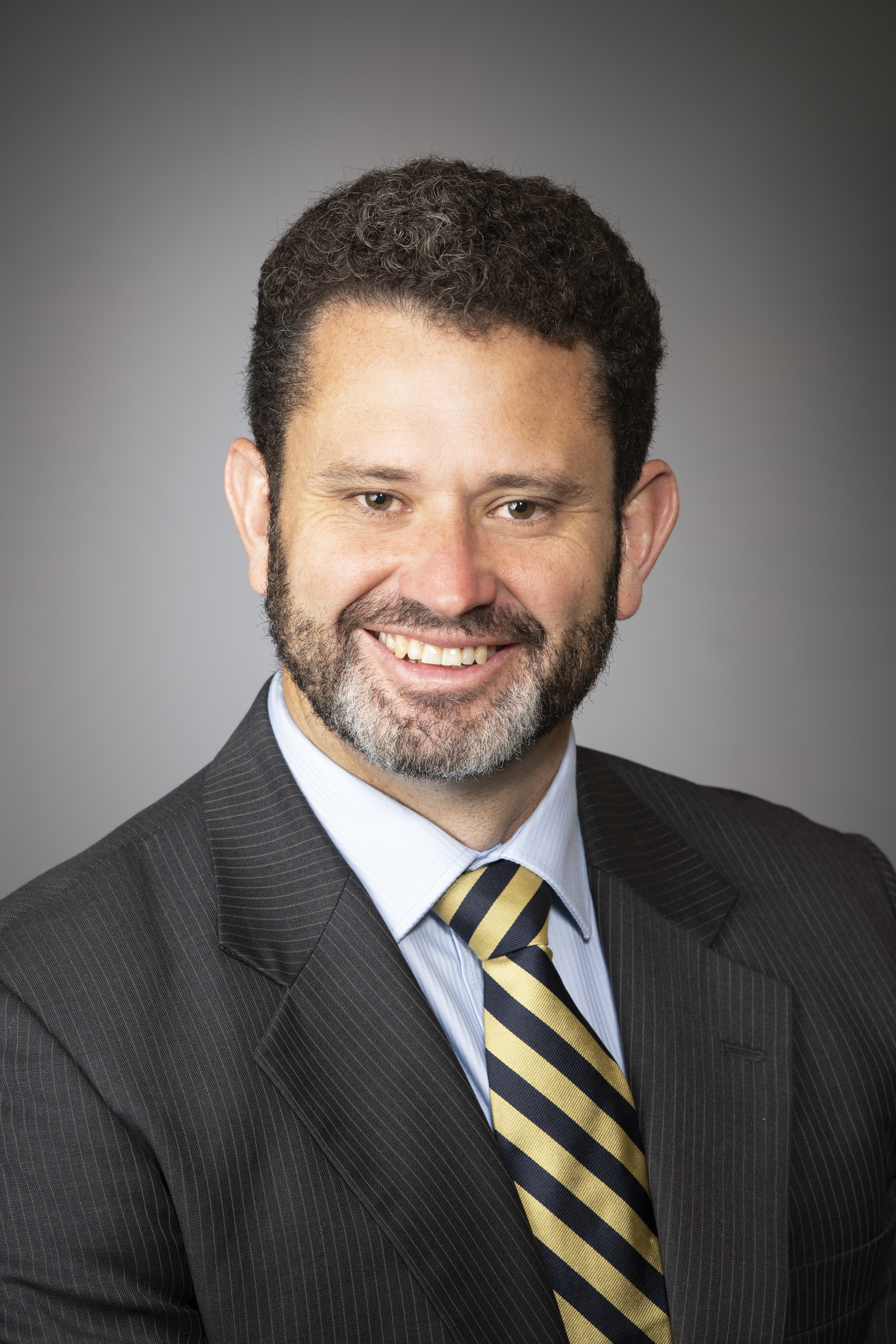
- Incumbent; Kyam Maher since 19 September 2025
- Department of the Premier and Cabinet
- Style: The Honourable (formal); Deputy Premier (informal)
- Member of: Parliament; Cabinet; Executive Council
- Reports to: Premier of South Australia
- Nominator: Premier of South Australia
- Appointer: Governor of South Australia on the advice of the premier
- Term length: At the governor's pleasure
- Formation: 26 March 1968
- First holder: Des Corcoran
- Salary: A$402,880 (2025)

The Deputy Premier of South Australia is the deputy head of government and the second highest ranking minister of the Government of South Australia. The current deputy premier is Kyam Maher, who was selected by Premier Peter Malinauskas in September 2025 during a reshuffle of the ministry.

== History ==
The office of Deputy Premier was created in March 1968. The first to serve in the position was Labor deputy leader Des Corcoran. Prior to that time the term was sometimes used unofficially for the second-highest ranking minister in the government, usually the Treasurer.

In both Labor and Liberal governments, the deputy premier is usually the party's deputy leader.

Two deputy premiers have subsequently become Premier in their own right: Des Corcoran and Rob Kerin. This last happened in 2001, when Rob Kerin became premier after John Olsen's resignation. Dean Brown did the reverse, becoming Deputy Premier to Rob Kerin, 5 years after his own premiership ended at the hands of John Olsen.

South Australia's longest-serving deputy premier is Kevin Foley, who served in the position from March 2002 to February 2011.

== Duties ==
The duties of the deputy premier are to act on behalf of the premier in his or her absence overseas or on leave. The deputy premier has additionally always held at least one substantive portfolio. It is possible for a minister to hold only the portfolio of Deputy Premier, but this has never happened.

If the premier were to die, become incapacitated or resign, the Governor would normally appoint the deputy premier as Premier. If the governing or majority party had not yet elected a new leader, that appointment would be on an interim basis. Should a different leader emerge, that person would then be appointed Premier.

== List of deputy premiers ==
The following is a list of deputy premiers of South Australia, from 1968 to present.

Order	Minister	Political party	Premier	Term of office		
Order	Minister	Political party	Premier	Took office	Left office	Tenure
1	Des Corcoran	Labor	Dunstan	26 March 1968	16 April 1968	21 days
(1)	Des Corcoran	Labor	Dunstan	2 June 1970	15 March 1979	8 years, 258 days
2	Hugh Hudson	Labor	Corcoran	15 March 1979	18 September 1979	187 days
3	Roger Goldsworthy	Liberal	Tonkin	18 September 1979	10 November 1982	3 years, 53 days
4	Jack Wright	Labor	Bannon	10 November 1982	16 July 1985	2 years, 248 days
5	Don Hopgood	Labor	Bannon	16 July 1985	4 September 1992	7 years, 50 days
6	Frank Blevins	Labor	Arnold	4 September 1992	14 December 1993	1 year, 101 days
7	Stephen Baker	Liberal	Brown	14 December 1993	28 November 1996	2 years, 350 days
8	Graham Ingerson	Liberal	Olsen	28 November 1996	7 July 1998	1 year, 221 days
9	Rob Kerin	Liberal	Olsen	7 July 1998	22 October 2001	3 years, 107 days
10	Dean Brown	Liberal	Kerin	22 October 2001	5 March 2002	134 days
11	Kevin Foley	Labor	Rann	5 March 2002	8 February 2011	8 years, 340 days
12	John Rau	Labor	Rann	8 February 2011	19 March 2018	7 years, 39 days
12	John Rau	Labor	Weatherill	8 February 2011	19 March 2018	7 years, 39 days
13	Vickie Chapman	Liberal	Marshall	19 March 2018	23 November 2021	3 years, 249 days
14	Dan van Holst Pellekaan	Liberal	Marshall	23 November 2021	21 March 2022	118 days
15	Susan Close	Labor	Malinauskas	21 March 2022	19 September 2025	3 years, 182 days
16	Kyam Maher	Labor	Malinauskas	19 September 2025	Incumbent	353 days
