= 2002 South Australian state election =

- 9 February 2002

All 47 seats in the South Australian House of Assembly 24 seats were needed for a majority 11 (of the 22) seats in the South Australian Legislative Council
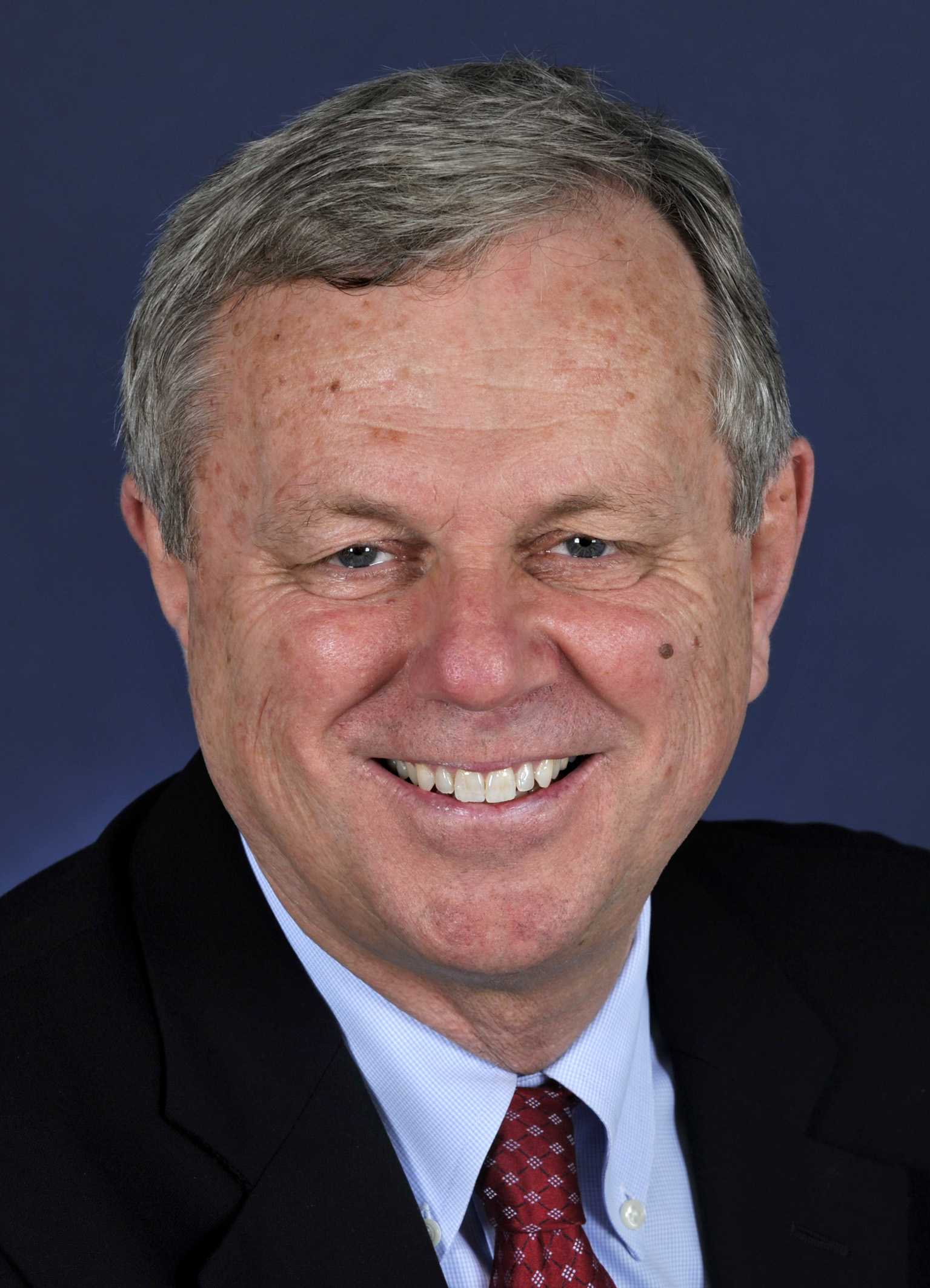

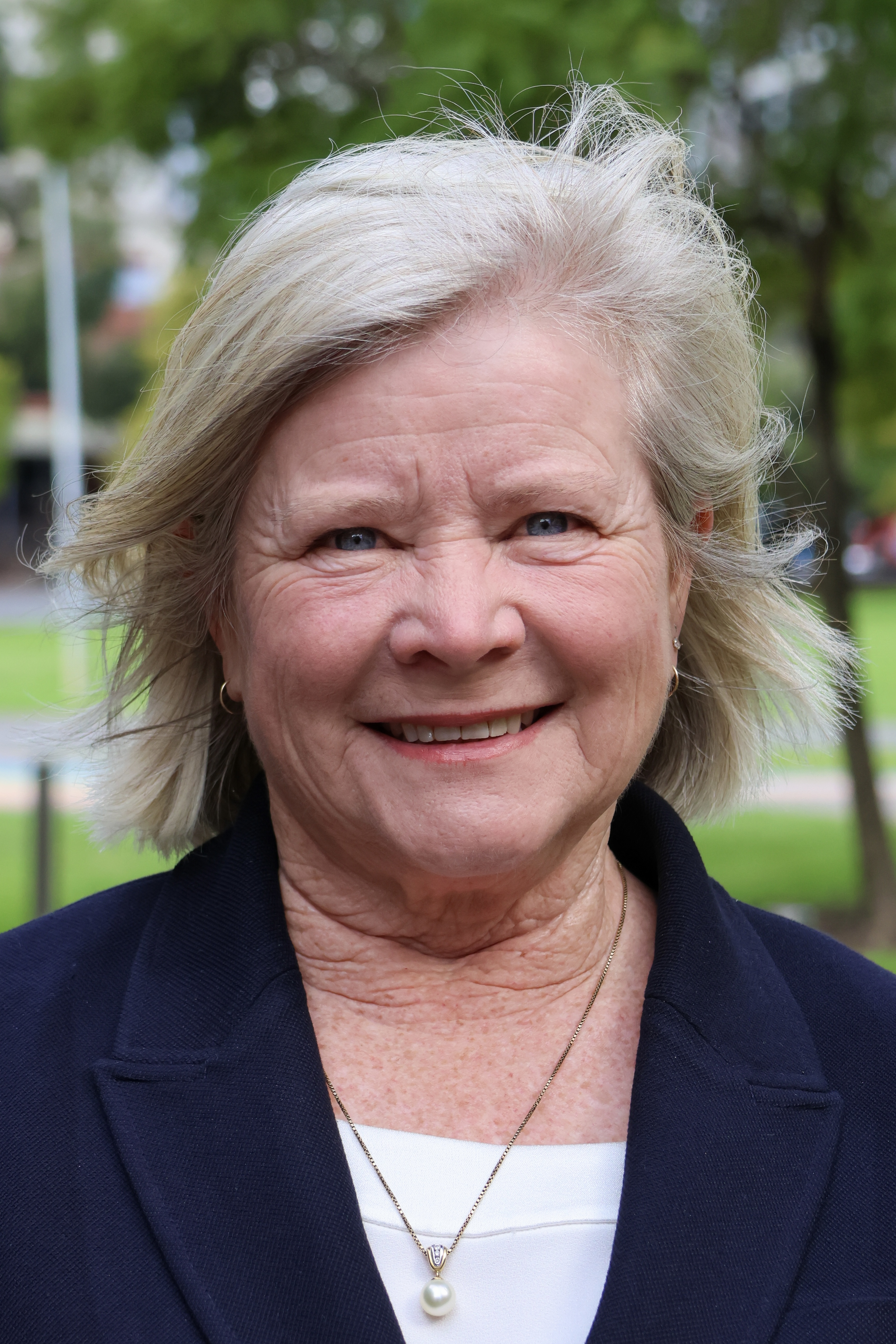
	First party	Second party	Third party
Leader	Mike Rann	Rob Kerin	Karlene Maywald
Party	Labor	Liberal	National
Leader since	5 November 1994	22 October 2001	11 October 1997
Leader's seat	Ramsay	Frome	Chaffey
Seats before	21 seats	22 seats	1 seat
Seats won	23	20	1
Seat change	▲2	▼2	Steady
Primary vote	344,559	378,929	13,748
Percentage	36.34	39.97	1.45%
Swing	▲1.18	▼0.43	▼0.29
TPP	49.07%	50.93%
TPP swing	▲0.58pp	▼0.58pp
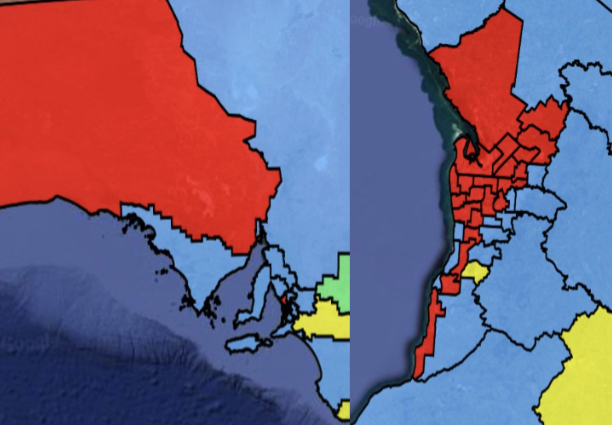
- Results by electorate
Premier before election
Rob Kerin
Liberal
Resulting Premier
Mike Rann
Labor

State elections were held in South Australia on 9 February 2002. All 47 seats in the South Australian House of Assembly were up for election, along with half of the 22 seats in the South Australian Legislative Council. The incumbent Liberal Party of Australia led by Premier of South Australia Rob Kerin was defeated by the Australian Labor Party led by Leader of the Opposition Mike Rann. The Labor Party won 23 out of 47 seats, and then secured the one more seat it needed for a majority by gaining the support of independent Peter Lewis.

== Background ==
This was the first election since Labor narrowly lost as opposition in the 1997 election, doing much better than most analysts predicted, forcing the Liberals to minority government after their comprehensive loss in the 1993 election where Labor were reduced to just ten seats. Coming into the 2002 election, the Liberal Government had faced a number of scandals including the Motorola affair, over which Premier John Olsen was forced to resign in October 2001. He was succeeded by Rob Kerin, who had less than three months to govern before the election was called.

== Key dates ==
- Issue of writ: 15 January 2002
- Close of electoral rolls: 22 January 2002
- Close of nominations: Friday 25 January 2002, at noon
- Polling day: 9 February 2002
- Return of writ: On or before 15 March 2002 (actually returned 26 February)

== Results ==
=== House of Assembly ===
South Australian state election, 9 February 2002 House of Assembly << 1997–2006 >>
Enrolled voters	1,045,563				
Votes cast	978,569		Turnout	93.59	+1.84
Informal votes	30,537		Informal	3.12	-0.92
Summary of votes by party
Party	Primary votes	%	Swing	Seats	Change
Liberal	378,929	39.97	▼-0.43	20	2
Labor	344,559	36.34	▲+1.18	23	+ 2
Democrats	71,026	7.49	▼-8.95	0	0
Family First	25,025	2.64	New	0	0
One Nation	22,833	2.41	New	0	0
Greens	22,332	2.36	▲+2.21	0	0
SA First	16,902	1.78	New	0	0
National	13,748	1.45	▼-0.29	1	0
Independent	40,288	4.25	▲+1.12	3	0
Other	12,390	1.31	*	0	0
Total	948,032			47	
Two-party-preferred
Labor	465,227	49.07	▲+0.58		
Liberal	482,805	50.93	▼–0.58		

Popular vote
Liberal	39.97%
Labor	36.34%
Democrats	7.49%
Independents	4.25%
Family First	2.64%
One Nation	2.41%
Greens	2.36%
SA First	1.78%
National	1.45%
Others	1.31%

Two-party-preferred vote
Liberal	50.93%
Labor	49.07%

Seats
Labor	48.94%
Liberal	42.55%
Independents	6.38%
National	2.13%

Independents: Rory McEwen, Bob Such, Peter Lewis

=== Seats changing hands ===
Seat	Pre-2002			Swing	Post-2002		
Seat	Party	Member	Margin	Swing	Margin	Member	Party
Adelaide	Liberal	Michael Harbison	2.2	3.2	1.0	Jane Lomax-Smith	Labor
Colton	Liberal	Steve Condous	1.0	5.6	4.6	Paul Caica	Labor
Fisher	Liberal	Bob Such	9.2	N/A	12.1	Bob Such	Independent
Hammond	Liberal	Peter Lewis	14.6	N/A	2.1	Peter Lewis	Independent
MacKillop	Independent	Mitch Williams	N/A	N/A	11.4	Mitch Williams	Liberal

- Members in italics did not recontest their seats.
- Bob Such and Peter Lewis were elected at the 1997 election as Liberals, but quit the party and recontested their seats as independents and won. Pre-election margins are vs Labor, After margins are against Liberal.
- Mitch Williams was elected at the 1997 election as an independent, but joined the Liberal party and recontested his seat as a Liberal. Margin is against Independent candidate Bill Hender.

=== Formation of Government ===
Labor won two seats from the Liberals, the districts of Adelaide (Jane Lomax-Smith) and Colton (Paul Caica). This gave Labor 23 seats, Liberals 20 seats, SA Nationals one seat, and three seats to independents. To form majority government, a party needed 24 seats out of 47. Most analysts expected Kerin to form a minority government with the support of Nationals MP Karlene Maywald, and the three independents, who were all former Liberal party members.

On 13 February, one of those crossbenchers, former Liberal Peter Lewis, announced that he had signed an agreement with Labor leader Mike Rann to support a Labor Government in exchange for holding a constitutional convention, making him speaker of the House of Assembly, and concessions for his electorate including the phasing out of commercial fishing in the River Murray, prioritising the eradication of the branched broomrape weed, changing water rates for irrigation, fast-tracking a feasibility study for a weir and lock at Wellington, and improving rural roads. This agreement effectively made Rann premier-elect by one seat.

However, following parliamentary precedent established by Don Dunstan following the 1968 election, Kerin refused to resign until Rann and Labor demonstrated that they had majority support on the floor of the House of Assembly. Kerin claimed to be within this rights to take this course, as longstanding precedent in the Westminster system holds that the incumbent premier should have the first opportunity to form a government if no party has a majority.

After three weeks of stalemate, the House of Assembly was called into session several weeks earlier than usual. With Lewis in the speaker's chair, the Kerin Government was defeated on the floor of the House of Assembly on 5 March 2002, after Kerin moved a confidence motion in his own government and lost. Rann then advised Governor Marjorie Jackson-Nelson that he could form a government, which was duly sworn in the following day.

Rann later shored up his government's majority by reaching agreements with crossbenchers Maywald and McEwen, giving them cabinet posts in exchange for their support of the government.

=== Legislative Council ===
South Australian state election, 9 February 2002 Legislative Council << 1997–2006 >>
Enrolled voters	1,045,563				
Votes cast	983,567		Turnout	94.1	+1.4
Informal votes	53,105		Informal	5.4	+1.1
Summary of votes by party
Party	Primary votes	%	Swing	Seats won	Seats held
Liberal	373,102	40.1	▲+2.3	5	9
Labor	305,595	32.9	▲+2.3	4	7
Democrats	68,317	7.3	▼–9.4	1	3
Family First	47,443	4.0	New	1	1
Greens	25,725	2.8	▲+1.1	0	0
One Nation	16,829	1.8	New	0	0
No Pokies	11,984	1.3	▼–1.5	0	1
Voluntary Euthanasia	10,973	1.2	▲+0.7	0	0
SA First	9,567	1.0	New	0	1
HEMP	8,241	0.9	▼–0.8	0	0
Grey Power	7,918	0.9	▼–0.7	0	0
National	4,412	0.5	▼–0.5	0	0
Other	40,356	4.3	*	0	0
Total	930,462			11	22

In the Legislative Council, Liberal won 5 seats (Robert Lawson, Caroline Schaefer, Angus Redford, David Ridgway, Terry Stephens), Labor won 4 seats (Gail Gago, Paul Holloway, Terry Roberts, John Gazzola), Australian Democrats won 1 seat (Sandra Kanck), and the recently formed Family First party won their first ever seat in an Australian parliament (Andrew Evans).

This left the overall numbers in the Legislative Council at: Liberal 9, Labor 7, Democrats 3, Family First 1, No Pokies 1, and 1 independent (Terry Cameron).

== Post-election pendulum ==
Labor seats (24)
Marginal
Norwood	Vini Ciccarello	ALP	0.5%
Adelaide	Jane Lomax-Smith	ALP	1.0%
Hammond	Peter Lewis	CLIC	2.1% v LIB
Wright	Jennifer Rankine	ALP	3.2%
Ashford	Steph Key	ALP	3.7%
Florey	Frances Bedford	ALP	3.7%
Elder	Pat Conlon	ALP	3.7%
Colton	Paul Caica	ALP	4.6%
Mitchell	Kris Hanna	ALP	4.7%
Fairly safe
Reynell	Gay Thompson	ALP	6.6%
Lee	Michael Wright	ALP	7.0%
Elizabeth	Lea Stevens	ALP	7.2%
Torrens	Robyn Geraghty	ALP	7.2%
West Torrens	Tom Koutsantonis	ALP	8.6%
Giles	Lyn Breuer	ALP	9.7%
Safe
Kaurna	John Hill	ALP	11.0%
Playford	Jack Snelling	ALP	13.1%
Napier	Michael O'Brien	ALP	14.3%
Enfield	John Rau	ALP	15.9%
Cheltenham	Jay Weatherill	ALP	16.7%
Taylor	Trish White	ALP	17.7%
Croydon	Michael Atkinson	ALP	19.1%
Ramsay	Mike Rann	ALP	20.2%
Port Adelaide	Kevin Foley	ALP	21.7%

Liberal seats (23)
Marginal
Hartley	Joe Scalzi	LIB	1.3%
Stuart	Graham Gunn	LIB	1.3%
Light	Malcolm Buckby	LIB	2.8%
Kavel	Mark Goldsworthy	LIB	2.9% v IND
Mawson	Robert Brokenshire	LIB	3.5%
Heysen	Isobel Redmond	LIB	4.0% v AD
Morialta	Joan Hall	LIB	4.1%
Bright	Wayne Matthew	LIB	5.0%
Newland	Dorothy Kotz	LIB	5.7%
Fairly safe
Unley	Mark Brindal	LIB	9.0%
Morphett	Duncan McFetridge	LIB	10.0%
Safe
MacKillop	Mitch Williams	LIB	11.4% v IND
Davenport	Iain Evans	LIB	11.5%
Frome	Rob Kerin	LIB	11.5%
Waite	Martin Hamilton-Smith	LIB	12.0%
Fisher	Bob Such	IND	12.1% v LIB
Schubert	Ivan Venning	LIB	13.1%
Chaffey	Karlene Maywald	NAT	14.0% v LIB
Finniss	Dean Brown	LIB	15.6%
Goyder	John Meier	LIB	16.2%
Bragg	Vickie Chapman	LIB	19.6%
Mt Gambier	Rory McEwen	IND	26.6% v LIB
Flinders	Liz Penfold	LIB	28.4%

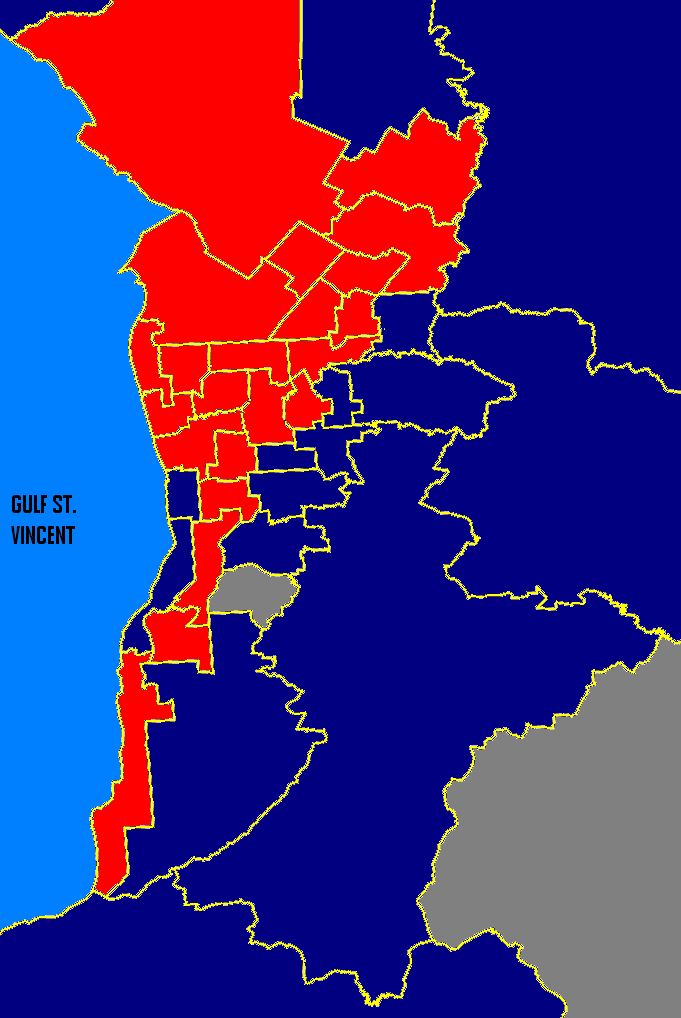
Metro SA: ALP in red, Liberal in blue, Independents in white. These boundaries are based on the 2006 electoral redistribution.

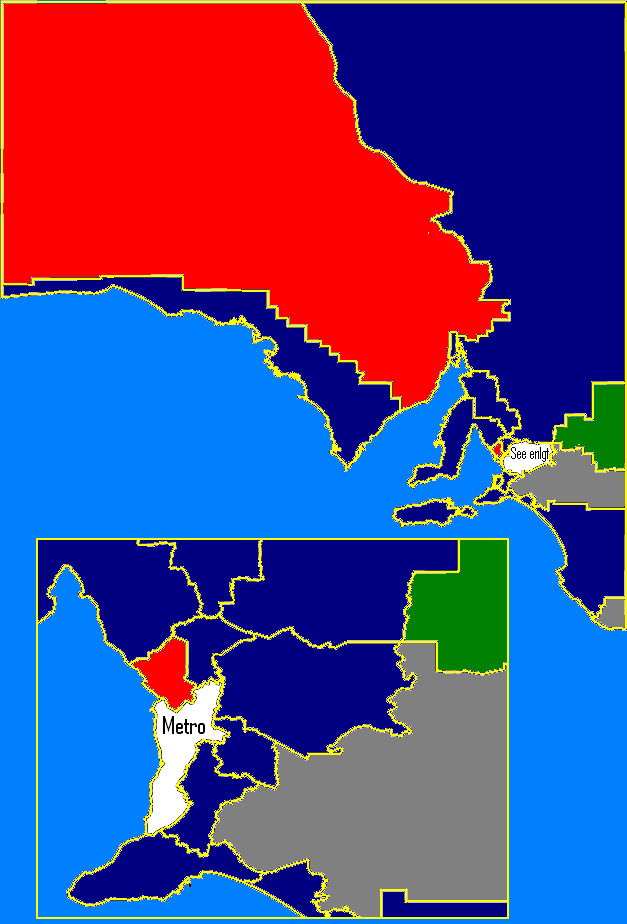
Rural SA: ALP in red, Liberal in blue, Independents in white, Nationals in green. These boundaries are based on the 2006 electoral redistribution.

== See also ==
- Rann government
