= Martin Hamilton-Smith =

Australian politician (born 1953)

The Honourable Martin Hamilton-Smith
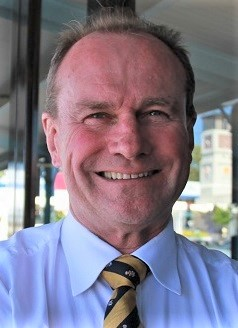

Leader of the Opposition in South Australia
- In office 12 April 2007 – 8 July 2009
- Premier: Mike Rann
- Deputy: Vickie Chapman; Isobel Redmond
- Preceded by: Iain Evans
- Succeeded by: Isobel Redmond

Minister for Investment and Trade
- In office 27 May 2014 – 17 January 2018
- Premier: Jay Weatherill
- Preceded by: Susan Close (as Minister for Manufacturing, Innovation and Trade)

Minister for Small Business
- In office 19 January 2016 – 17 January 2018
- Premier: Jay Weatherill
- Preceded by: Tom Koutsantonis

Minister for Defence and Space Industries
- In office 27 May 2014 – 17 January 2018
- Premier: Jay Weatherill
- Preceded by: Jack Snelling

Minister for Health Industries
- In office 18 September 2017 – 18 January 2018
- Premier: Jay Weatherill
- Preceded by: Office created

Minister for Veterans' Affairs
- In office 27 May 2014 – 18 January 2018
- Premier: Jay Weatherill
- Preceded by: Zoe Bettison

Leader of the South Australian Liberal Party
- In office 12 April 2007 – 8 July 2009
- Deputy: Vickie Chapman; Isobel Redmond
- Preceded by: Iain Evans
- Succeeded by: Isobel Redmond

Deputy Leader of the South Australian Liberal Party
- In office 30 March 2010 – 6 April 2010
- Leader: Isobel Redmond
- Preceded by: Steven Griffiths
- Succeeded by: Mitch Williams

Minister for Innovation
- In office 4 December 2001 – 5 March 2002
- Premier: Rob Kerin
- Preceded by: none (created)
- Succeeded by: none (abolished)

Minister for Tourism
- In office 4 December 2001 – 5 March 2002
- Premier: Rob Kerin
- Preceded by: Rob Kerin
- Succeeded by: Mike Rann

Member of the South Australian Parliament for Waite
- In office 11 October 1997 – 17 March 2018
- Preceded by: Stephen Baker
- Succeeded by: Sam Duluk

Personal details
- Born: Martin Leslie James Hamilton-Smith; 1 December 1953 (age 72) Adelaide, South Australia
- Party: Liberal Party of Australia (SA) (1997–2014); Independent (2014–2018)
- Spouse: Stavroula Raptis
- Education: Royal Military College, Duntroon; University of New South Wales; University of Adelaide
- Website: MartinHamilton-Smith.com.au

Military service
- Allegiance: Australia
- Branch/service: Australian Army
- Years of service: 1971–1995
- Rank: Lieutenant Colonel
- Commands: Australian contingent of the Multinational Force and Observers; 1st Commando Regiment
- Battles/wars: Second Malayan Emergency

Martin Leslie James Hamilton-Smith (born 1 December 1953) is a former Australian politician and army officer who represented the South Australian House of Assembly seat of Waite from the 1997 election until his retirement in 2018. First elected as a candidate for the Liberal Party, Hamilton-Smith was the state parliamentary leader of the Liberal Party and the Leader of the Opposition in South Australia from 2007 to 2009, and a Minister in the Kerin Liberal government from 2001 to 2002.

He became an independent two months after the 2014 election. He served as the Minister for Investment and Trade, Minister for Defence Industries and Minister for Veterans' Affairs in the Weatherill Labor cabinet from May 2014 until January 2018 and Minister for Space Industries and Minister for Health Industries from September 2017 until January 2018.

Hamilton-Smith announced on 6 January 2018 that he would not seek re-election in the 2018 election.

== Education ==
Graduated from Marion High School with a scholarship to attend the Royal Military College, Duntroon in 1971. Completed a Bachelor of Arts (University of NSW) while at Duntroon. Master of Arts (History) from the University of NSW in 1985 with a focus on Australia's relations with the United States of America and South East Asia. Graduated from Army Command and Staff College in 1988 (Graduate Diploma in Management Studies). Master of Business Administration (Advanced) at University of Adelaide in 2002 while serving as a Member of Parliament. Awarded the 1999 Baron Partner's Prize in Strategic Management.

== Military service ==
Graduated from Royal Military College as an officer in the Australian Army in 1975. Served in 6th Battalion of the Royal Australian Regiment and the Australian Special Air Service Regiment (SASR). He commanded Australia's first counter-terrorist assault force in the SAS in 1980. He saw service in Malaysia and as commanding officer of the 1st Commando Regiment based in Sydney. In 1993 he was posted as commanding officer of the Australian contingent in the 11 nation Multinational Force and Observers (MFO) in Sinai, Egypt, also serving as Assistant Chief of the 3,200-man force which monitors the peace agreement between Israel and Egypt from Gaza to the Gulf of Aqaba.

== Business career ==
Hamilton-Smith left the Army in 1995 to build a property development, investment and private child care centre business which had been first established in 1989. The family business employed around 125 staff at six business sites in two states, South Australia and New South Wales, and involved the construction of new facilities and the trading operation of the enterprises. Hamilton-Smith became President of a South Australian-based childcare association and National Secretary of the Australian Confederation of Childcare and editor of the ACCC national magazine from 1995 to 1997. These bodies represented the small business sector of childcare before federal and state parliaments.

== Parliament ==
Hamilton-Smith first won Waite in the 1997 election by six percent against the Democrats on a two-candidate basis. Ahead of the election, he ran for Liberal preselection in Waite as a non-factionally-aligned conservative, defeating both Robert Lawson from the moderate faction and Hugh Martin from the conservative faction. Previous Waite MP Stephen Baker, from the moderate faction, resigned two months prior to the election which was seen as a result of losing the deputy leadership after the coup of leader Dean Brown from the moderate faction, by John Olsen from the conservative faction. The preselection victory of Hamilton-Smith prompted Brown to complain of interference by federal conservative faction MPs Nick Minchin, Grant Chapman, and Andrew Southcott.

At the 2002 election when Rann Labor came to power, Hamilton-Smith retained his seat by twelve percent against Labor on 2PP, and by four percent at the 2006 election. Hamilton-Smith was promoted by Premier John Olsen into the position of Cabinet Secretary on 5 October 2001 and was later elevated into Cabinet as the Innovation and Tourism minister in the Kerin Liberal government from December 2001 to March 2002.

=== Liberal leader ===
In October 2005, he moved to challenge then Liberal leader Rob Kerin, but later withdrew his challenge. On 11 April 2007, Hamilton-Smith formally challenged then Liberal leader Iain Evans, and was successful with 13 votes to 10 for the Liberal leadership. On 19 April 2007, he announced a re-shuffle of the opposition front bench.

Under his leadership, polling by Newspoll saw the Liberals go from 29 to 40 per cent on the primary vote, and from 39 to 50 per cent on the two party preferred vote. The Preferred Premier rating saw Hamilton-Smith start on 21 per cent, seven points higher than his predecessor, to a high of 30 per cent, with Rann falling from a high of 64, to 48 per cent. However, Newspoll saw Labor back in a winning position on 54 to 46 in late 2008, and then 56 to 44 in early 2009 along with a widening gap in the Preferred Premier rating. During the 50-50 polling, The Sunday Mail polling suggested that whilst there had been large swings away from the government in country areas, support was holding relatively firm at 2006 election levels in the metropolitan areas. However, this did not play out at the 2009 Frome state by-election sparked by the parliamentary resignation of former Premier Rob Kerin, which saw a rare two-party swing from the opposition to the government, and resulted in independent Geoff Brock taking the seat from the Liberals on preferences.

=== 2009 leadership spill ===
Hamilton-Smith accused Labor of accepting split donations from the Church of Scientology based on information sent to the Liberal Opposition that was subsequently found to have been forged. This controversy coupled with the Frome by-election and continued poor polling, saw Liberal MPs openly talk of a leadership change, with a high chance of a leadership spill likely, prior to the 2010 state election. Two days later, Hamilton-Smith announced a spill of the leadership and deputy leadership, with a ballot taking place on Saturday 4 July 2009. Williams, Isobel Redmond, and Iain Evans ruled out contesting the ballot, with Hamilton-Smith and his moderate deputy Vickie Chapman the only contenders. Hamilton-Smith defeated Chapman in the leadership spill, 11 votes to 10, with one MP abstaining. At first, Hamilton-Smith immediately announced he would stand down, which would have delivered the leadership to Chapman. Hamilton-Smith announced a second leadership ballot to be held on Wednesday 8 July. On Monday 6 July, Hamilton-Smith confirmed he would not be running for the leadership. Contenders for the leadership were Chapman, Redmond, and Williams. Hamilton-Smith and his supporters backed Redmond. Redmond won the leadership spill on 8 July 2009, 13 votes to 9 against Chapman.

=== Deputy Leader ===
On 30 March 2010, Hamilton-Smith was elected deputy leader of SA Liberals to replace Steven Griffiths in a party-room vote, defeating Iain Evans 10 votes to 8. He once again defeated Evans in a leadership position in a rematch between the two former leaders.

=== 2012 leadership spill ===
Hamilton-Smith nominated for the position of South Australian Liberal parliamentary leader, with Steven Marshall as deputy leader after Hamilton-Smith declared a leadership spill against Isobel Redmond and Mitch Williams. A party room ballot occurred on 23 October 2012, Redmond retained the leadership by one vote, however Marshall was elected to the deputy leadership.

Redmond resigned on 31 January 2013. Hamilton-Smith chose to support Steven Marshall who was elected leader unopposed. Hamilton-Smith was appointed Shadow Minister for Economic and Regional Development, Mineral Resources and Energy, Manufacturing, Industry and Trade, and Defence Industries in the subsequent reshuffle.

=== Independent Liberal in a Labor cabinet ===
The 2014 election resulted in a hung parliament with 23 Labor seats, 22 Liberal seats, and two independents. The balance of power was held by crossbench independents Geoff Brock and Bob Such. Such did not indicate who he would support in a minority government before he was diagnosed and hospitalised with a brain tumour and took medical leave. With 24 seats required to govern, Brock backed Labor. He accepted the cabinet positions of Minister for Regional Development and Minister for State and Government Local Relations. Brock agreed to support the Labor government on confidence and supply while retaining the right to otherwise vote on conscience.

On 27 May 2014, more than two months after the election, in a media conference with South Australian Labor Premier Jay Weatherill, Hamilton-Smith announced his decision to resign from the South Australian Liberal Party to become an "Independent Liberal" MP, and to join the Labor cabinet as the Minister for Trade, Defence Industries and Veterans' Affairs. Though his vote was not crucial to the government, he agreed to support the Labor minority government on confidence and supply while retaining the right to otherwise vote on conscience, stating that South Australian business needed a stable parliament.

An Advertiser poll of 350 Waite voters was conducted a few days after Hamilton-Smith's announcement. On the question of "should there be a by-election in Waite", 43 percent said no, 41 percent said yes. On the question of "do you feel betrayed by his decision", 46 percent said no, 42 percent said yes.

Labor unexpectedly won the 2014 Fisher by-election by five votes, following a 7.3 percent swing, which gave them majority government. Despite that, the Weatherill government kept Brock and Hamilton-Smith in cabinet, giving it a 26 to 21 parliamentary majority.

Hamilton-Smith was appointed to the ministerial portfolio of small business in 2016. In September 2017, he was appointed minister with responsibilities for space industries and health industries. Major achievements over four years as a minister included helping to retain $90 billion worth of submarine and shipbuilding work in SA, establishing Investment Attraction South Australia, construction of the Centenary of ANZAC Memorial Walk along Kintor Avenue, hosting the International Space and Astronautical Congress in Adelaide as Australia's first space industries minister, and improving communication of small business through the establishment of a small business roundtable.

While serving as Leader of the Liberal Opposition, Hamilton-Smith led the debate to move football from West Lakes to the city, resulting in the redevelopment of Adelaide Oval.

On 6 January 2018, Hamilton-Smith announced that he would retire at the 2018 state election and resigned from the Weatherill Ministry on 17 January 2018.

Political offices
Preceded by Iain Evans	Leader of the Opposition in South Australia; 2007–2009	Succeeded by Isobel Redmond
Preceded by Steven Griffiths	Deputy Leader of the Opposition in South Australia; 2010	Succeeded by Mitch Williams
Preceded by Jack Snelling	Minister for Defence Industries; 2014–2017	Continues as Minister for Defence and Space Industries
Preceded by Zoe Bettison	Minister for Veterans' Affairs; 2014–2018	Succeeded by Steven Marshall
Previously as Minister for Defence Industries	Minister for Defence and Space Industries; 2017–2018	Succeeded by Steven Marshall
Preceded by Susan Close	Minister for Investment and Trade; 2014–2018	Succeeded by David Ridgway
Preceded by Jack Snelling	Minister for Health Industries; 2017–2018	Succeeded by David Ridgway
Preceded by Tom Koutsantonis	Minister for Small Business; 2016–2018	Succeeded by David Pisoni
South Australian House of Assembly
Preceded by Stephen Baker	Member for Waite; 1997–2018	Succeeded by Sam Duluk
Party political offices
Preceded by Iain Evans	Leader of the Liberal Party of Australia (South Australian Division); 2007–2009	Succeeded by Isobel Redmond
