= Caroline Schaefer =

Australian politician

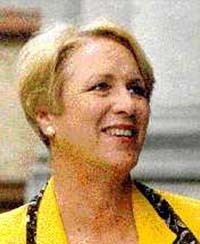
Caroline Schaefer

Caroline Veronica Schaefer (born 16 April 1947) is an Australian politician, and a Liberal Party member of the South Australian Legislative Council from 1993 to 2010.

Community activities involve Australian Women in Agriculture, board member; Leader, SA Trade Delegation to Hofex '97 and '99, Hong Kong; Leader, SA Delegation to Women in Agriculture Conference in USA 1998; Registered Show Jumping Judge; Former Councillor, Kimba Catholic Church; Member, Isolated Children and Parents Association; Kimba District Councillor 1989–93; Kimba District Hospital Board of Management 1983–93; Patron, Rural SA Network; Patron, Women's Fishing Network; State Councillor, Liberal Party of Australia (SA Branch); Member, Liberal Party Rural and Regional Council Executive

Schaefer has held many positions in previous governments and committees, most notably Government Whip in the Legislative Council from 1996 to 2001 and Minister for Primary Industries from December 2001 to March 2002.

Schaefer retired at the 2010 state election.
