= Iain Evans =

Australian politician (born 1959)

The Honourable Iain Evans

Leader of the Opposition in South Australia
- In office 29 March 2006 – 12 April 2007
- Deputy: Vickie Chapman
- Preceded by: Rob Kerin
- Succeeded by: Martin Hamilton-Smith

Leader of the South Australian Liberal Party
- In office 29 March 2006 – 12 April 2007
- Deputy: Vickie Chapman
- Preceded by: Rob Kerin
- Succeeded by: Martin Hamilton-Smith

Deputy Leader of the South Australian Liberal Party
- In office 21 November 2005 – 29 March 2006
- Leader: Rob Kerin
- Preceded by: Dean Brown
- Succeeded by: Vickie Chapman

Minister for Environment and Heritage
- In office 14 February 2000 – 5 March 2002
- Premier: John Olsen; Rob Kerin
- Preceded by: Dorothy Kotz
- Succeeded by: John Hill

Minister for Industry and Trade
- In office 8 October 1998 – 4 December 2001
- Premier: John Olsen; Rob Kerin
- Preceded by: John Olsen
- Succeeded by: Rob Lucas

Minister for Recreation, Sport & Racing
- In office 8 October 1998 – 4 December 2001
- Premier: John Olsen; Rob Kerin
- Preceded by: Himself (as Delegate Minister)
- Succeeded by: Dorothy Kotz

Minister for Police and Emergency Services
- In office 17 December 1997 – 8 October 1998
- Premier: John Olsen
- Preceded by: Trevor Griffin
- Succeeded by: Robert Brokenshire

Member of the South Australian Parliament for Davenport
- In office 11 December 1993 – 30 October 2014
- Preceded by: Stan Evans
- Succeeded by: Sam Duluk

Personal details
- Born: Iain Frederick Evans; 18 April 1959 (age 67) Darlington, South Australia
- Party: Liberal Party of Australia (SA)
- Relations: Stanley Evans (father)
- Education: University of South Australia
- Profession: Politician; lobbyist

Iain Frederick Evans (born 18 April 1959) is a former Australian politician. He was leader of the South Australian Division of the Liberal Party of Australia from 2006 to 2007.

== Early life ==
Evans attended Heathfield Primary and subsequently Heathfield High School. He later gained a bachelor's degree for Building Technology from the SA Institute of Technology (now part of the University of South Australia). Prior to entering politics he managed a family-owned building and retailing business. His father is Stan Evans and mother, Barb Evans.

== Parliament ==
He was elected in the 1993 election landslide for the safe conservative seat of Davenport (following the retirement of his father, Stan Evans). Evans held various portfolios in the Olsen and Kerin governments, including Correctional Services, Environment & Heritage, Racing and Volunteers. He gained the Deputy Leadership in November 2005 and with the resignation of Kerin after the electoral defeat of 2006 became Leader of the South Australian Liberal Party in a joint leadership ticket with factional rival Vickie Chapman.

The following is a quote from pollbludger.com:

Evans Senior decided to pull the pin altogether and make way for his son at the 1993 election. Evans Junior arrived just in time for a Liberal government and quickly established himself, making it to cabinet in December 1997. He has served in the police, industry, trade and environment portfolios in government, and in planning and industrial relations in opposition. Widely rated as the Liberal Party's best performer in parliament, Evans was discussed as a potential successor when John Olsen was obliged to resign over the Motorola affair in October 2001. It rarely escapes notice that his factional rival to succeed Rob Kerin as leader is Vickie Chapman, daughter of the aforementioned Ted Chapman – perpetuating a rivalry which now spans three decades. Evans achieved a major victory when he defeated Chapman in the deputy leadership vote after Dean Brown's resignation in November 2005, by 15 votes to five.

By February 2007, financial woes within the state Liberal party as well as contests between the party president and opposition leadership had come to a head. At a meeting in Norwood, Evans reportedly commented that "when we lose the federal election at the end of the year, the Liberal Party will be in dire straits and we have got to plan to deal with that". The alleged gaffe drew a rebuke from one federal Liberal MP who labelled Evans and his state parliamentary team "hopeless". Party president Christopher Moriarty accused Evans of being "piss-weak and gutless" for not backing a business plan aimed at assisting the party out of its parlous financial situation. High-ranking party members were canvassing support for an urgent no-confidence motion in Mr Moriarty, with one senior figure quoted as saying that "Moriarty is to the Liberal Party what Mark Latham was to Labor", but others counselled Evans against challenging Moriarty due to the high chance of failure. By late February, speculation over the opposition leader's future was being reported in the media, although he was expected to survive in the short term due to lack of options with 15 MPs remaining in the lower house. Initial reports suggested previous aspirant Martin Hamilton-Smith might challenge for the position, with Isobel Redmond as deputy.

In early April, Hamilton-Smith announced his leadership intentions to challenge Evans. Former Liberal Premier Kerin offered his opinion that Hamilton-Smith should and would fail, however on 11 April 2007, Hamilton-Smith defeated Evans on 13 votes to 10, becoming the new Liberal opposition leader after deputy leader Vickie Chapman offered her support to him.

Upon former Liberal leader Alexander Downer's retirement from federal politics, Evans announced his nomination for Liberal preselection in the 2008 Mayo by-election. The preselection plebiscite was held to be held on 22 July, but was brought forward to 20 July, with former Howard staffer chiefly for WorkChoices, Jamie Briggs, winning preselection, with Evans coming second. Bob Day, who held membership of the Liberal Party for 20 years, and the endorsed Liberal candidate for Makin in 2007, quit the party after failing in his bid to win Mayo preselection, citing a "manipulated" preselection process. Evans agreed to some extent.

Remarkably on 30 March 2010 exactly four years after he had been elected Liberal leader, Evans stood for the deputy's job but was defeated by the man who toppled him for the leadership in 2007, Hamilton-Smith. Evans was once again defeated by Hamilton-Smith for a leadership position in a rematch between the two former leaders. Evans was overlooked for the deputy's job despite getting the support of Redmond. Redmond had made it known that Hamilton-Smith was not her preferred deputy and a party room meeting was called for 6 April to reconsider the deputy's job. Hamilton-Smith stood aside but Evans did not renominate for the job, and it went instead to Mitch Williams.

On 31 January 2013, Redmond resigned as leader. Steven Marshall, who had by this point replaced Williams as deputy leader, became acting leader and formally appointed leader on 4 February. Evans, once again contested the now vacant deputy's job but was defeated by his former deputy Vickie Chapman.

Evans suffered a 2.8-point two-party swing against him, reduced to a margin of 8.1 points in Davenport at the 2014 state election, with two-party swings against him of up to 8 points in some booths, including the traditionally Liberal-voting booth of Belair which Labor won by three votes. On 6 June 2014 he announced he would stand down from the shadow ministry and parliament within a year and before the next election. There was speculation that Evans was asked to delay his resignation and the by-election for a year due to federal Liberal government budget cuts and that there could be a "super Saturday" of by-elections in up to five Liberal-held seats.

Evans resigned from parliament on 30 October 2014. A 2015 Davenport by-election occurred.

== Post-Parliamentary career ==
Evans is a political lobbyist active in South Australia. As of April 2018, he is lobbying on behalf of Leigh Creek Energy. He also lobbies for Kangaroo Island Plantation Timbers, which has proposed to construct an international port on the north coast of Kangaroo Island.

Political offices
Preceded by Rob Kerin	Leader of the Opposition in South Australia; 2006 – 2007	Succeeded by Martin Hamilton-Smith
Preceded by Dean Brown	Deputy Leader of the Opposition in South Australia; 2005 – 2006	Succeeded by Vickie Chapman
Parliament of South Australia
Preceded by Stan Evans	Member for Davenport; 1993–2014	Succeeded by Sam Duluk
Party political offices
Preceded by Rob Kerin	Leader of the Liberal Party of Australia (South Australian Division); 2006 – 2007	Succeeded by Martin Hamilton-Smith
