= Robert Lawson (South Australian politician) =

Australian politician

The Honourable Robert Lawson RFD KC
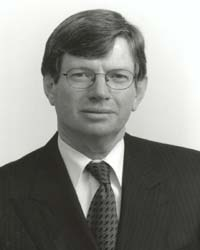
- Robert Lawson

Member of the South Australian Legislative Council
- In office 11 December 1993 – 19 March 2010

45th Attorney-General of South Australia
- In office 4 December 2001 – 5 March 2002
- Preceded by: Trevor Griffin
- Succeeded by: Michael Atkinson

Personal details
- Born: Robert David Lawson; 15 August 1944 (age 81)
- Party: Liberal Party
- Portfolio: Attorney-General of South Australia

Military service
- Branch/service: Royal Australian Air Force Reserve
- Awards: Reserve Force Decoration

Robert David Lawson, RFD, KC (born 15 August 1944) was an Australian politician from 1993 to 2010 as a Liberal Party member of the South Australian Legislative Council.

Prior to entering politics, Lawson was appointed Queen's Counsel.

He held many positions in Liberal governments, such as Parliamentary Secretary for Information Technology, Presiding Member of Legislative Review Committee, Minister for the Ageing, Minister for Disability Services, Minister for Administrative Services, Minister for Information Services, Minister for Administrative and Information Services, Minister for Workplace Relations, Consumer Affairs, and briefly, 45th Attorney-General of South Australia. He has also held many positions in the Shadow Ministry, as well as Deputy Leader of the Opposition in the Legislative Council.

Lawson retired at the 2010 state election.

Political offices
Preceded by Trevor Griffin	Attorney-General of South Australia; 2001–2002	Succeeded by Michael Atkinson
