= Motorola affair =

Controversial Motorola deal involving former South Australian Premier Olsen

The Motorola affair was an incident that resulted in the resignation of South Australian Premier John Olsen on 22 October 2001. Olsen's resignation came after the release of the Clayton Report, which stated that he had given "misleading, inaccurate and dishonest evidence to a judicial inquiry".

== History ==
Following the 1983 Ash Wednesday bushfires in South Australia, it was found that the state's emergency services radio network needed significant improvement. A whole-of-government network was later recommended. In mid-1993, consultants suggested that Motorola technology would be most suited for the government radio network.

Separate to the government radio network, in 1994, Olsen, the state's industry minister at the time, signed a deal with Motorola to establish a software centre in Adelaide. Later in parliament, Olsen claimed he did not discuss with Motorola about the government radio network contract. Two years later, in November 1996, Olsen became Premier and announced Motorola was the preferred supplier for the government radio network.

In 1998, it was alleged that during the 1994 software centre deal, Olsen promised Motorola preferential treatment for the government radio contract. This led to a judiciary inquiry into the deal, which investigated if Olsen had misled Parliament over the contract. The report from the inquiry prepared by former chief magistrate Jim Cramond cleared Olsen of any wrongdoing.

In February 2001, opposition frontbencher Pat Conlon revealed leaked documents he claimed were withheld from the Cramond inquiry. This led to suspicion that the documents from the inquiry were deliberately withheld. In March, Olsen appointed Dean Clayton QC to look into the 1998 inquiry. The report, named Clayton Report, was released in October which stated that Olsen had given "misleading, inaccurate and dishonest evidence" to the judicial inquiry. The report also found that former Government adviser Alex Kennedy and the former head of his Department of Industry and Trade also "gave false evidence to the same inquiry".

In the days following the findings, there was growing speculation that Olsen would either resign or face a leadership spill within his own party. He ended up fronting the media and was steadfast in his own defence saying the report that he set up was wrong and handed out copies of his own 48 page response. Olsen stated "It says amongst other things that I, in answers to Mr Cramond, was misleading, inaccurate and dishonest. I was not and I absolutely refute Mr Clayton's assertion. The report clearly indicates there are no criminal activities, no illegal activities", and again backed the Motorola deal that was done. However, he went on to say he was "a political realist and for that reason I intend to offer my resignation to my Party as Premier of this State". He said he intended to seek further legal advice and continue to defend his integrity.

Olsen was replaced as leader and premier by Rob Kerin on 22 October 2001.

The Motorola affair was a slap in the face for local industry. Philips Australia was, at that time, manufacturing its range of mobile radios (PMR) at its Hendon facility. The line was moved to Hendon in 1990, and continued manufacturing until the line was transferred to Philips's Melbourne facility in 1998. Philips had a long history of manufacturing in South Australia, having been attracted to Adelaide by the Playford government in 1946, with design and manufacturing continuing at Hendon long after Motorola had come and gone. The question as to why a local manufacturer was never considered for the government radio contract in South Australia has never been answered.
