= Dean Brown =

Australian politician

The Honourable Dean Brown AO
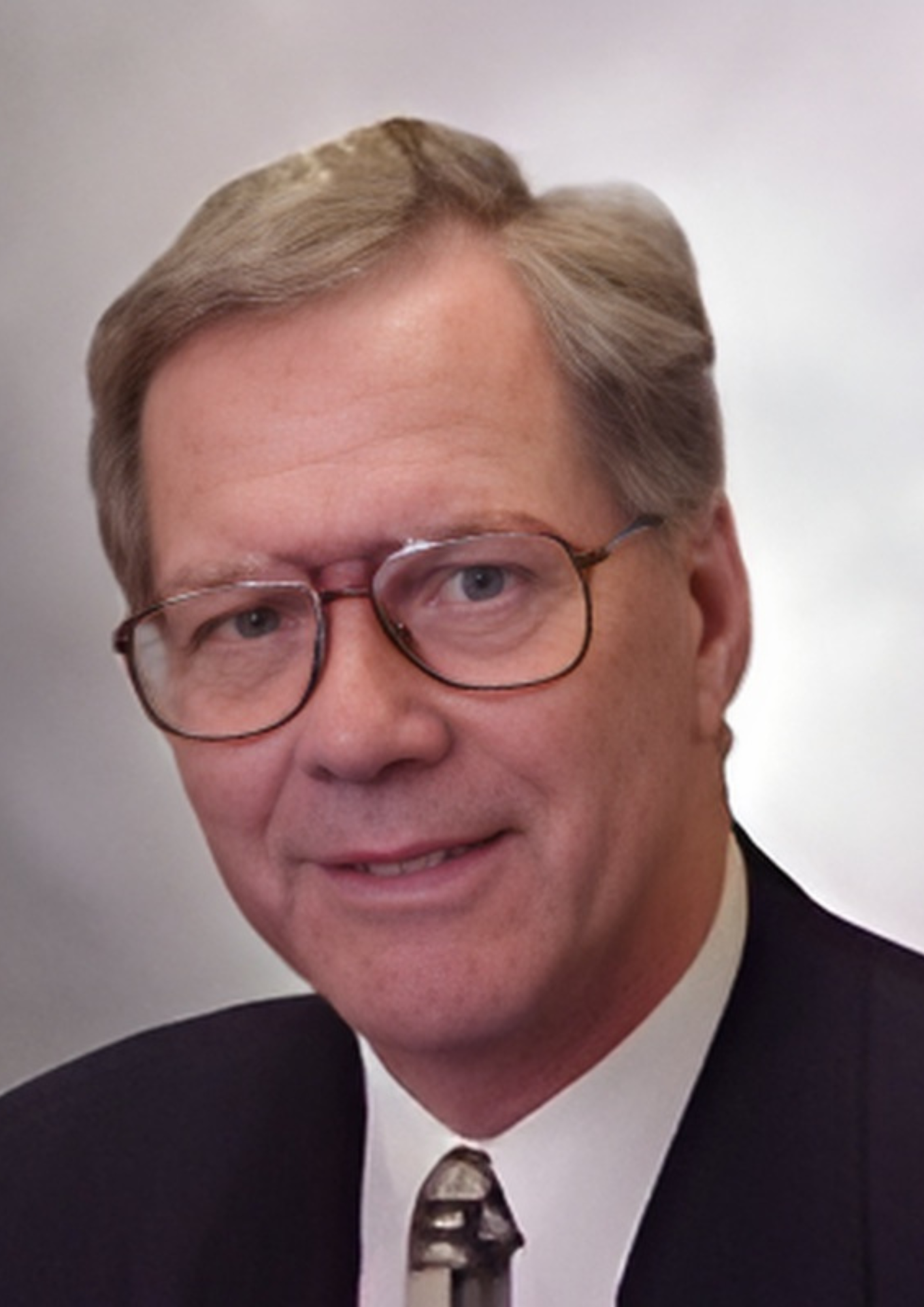
- Brown in 1996

41st Premier of South Australia
- In office 14 December 1993 – 28 November 1996
- Monarch: Elizabeth II
- Governor: Dame Roma Mitchell; Sir Eric Neal
- Deputy: Stephen Baker
- Preceded by: Lynn Arnold
- Succeeded by: John Olsen

Deputy Premier of South Australia
- In office 22 October 2001 – 5 March 2002
- Premier: Rob Kerin
- Preceded by: Rob Kerin
- Succeeded by: Kevin Foley

Leader of the Opposition in South Australia
- In office 11 May 1992 – 14 December 1993
- Deputy: Stephen Baker
- Preceded by: Dale Baker
- Succeeded by: Lynn Arnold

Leader of the South Australian Liberal Party
- In office 11 May 1992 – 28 November 1996
- Deputy: Stephen Baker
- Preceded by: Dale Baker
- Succeeded by: John Olsen

Deputy Leader of the South Australian Liberal Party
- In office 22 October 2001 – 21 November 2005
- Leader: Rob Kerin
- Preceded by: Rob Kerin
- Succeeded by: Iain Evans

Member of the South Australian House of Assembly
- In office 11 December 1993 – 17 March 2006
- Preceded by: Seat established
- Succeeded by: Michael Pengilly
- Constituency: Finniss
- In office 9 May 1992 – 11 December 1993
- Preceded by: Ted Chapman
- Succeeded by: Seat abolished
- Constituency: Alexandra
- In office 10 March 1973 – 7 December 1985
- Preceded by: Joyce Steele
- Succeeded by: Stan Evans
- Constituency: Davenport

Personal details
- Born: Dean Craig Brown; 5 April 1943 (age 83) Adelaide, South Australia, Australia
- Party: Liberal Party of Australia (SA)

Dean Craig Brown, AO (born 5 April 1943) is a politician who served as the Premier of South Australia between 14 December 1993 and 28 November 1996, and also served as 10th Deputy Premier of South Australia between 22 October 2001 and 5 March 2002, representing the South Australian Division of the Liberal Party of Australia. He became premier when he led the party to a landslide win at the 1993 state election, and lost the office when he lost a leadership challenge to John Olsen in November 1996.

== Early life ==
Prior to entering politics Brown was a research scientist. Brown holds a Bachelor of Rural Science, Diploma in Business Administration, and he earned a Master of Rural Science at the University of New England.

== Political career ==
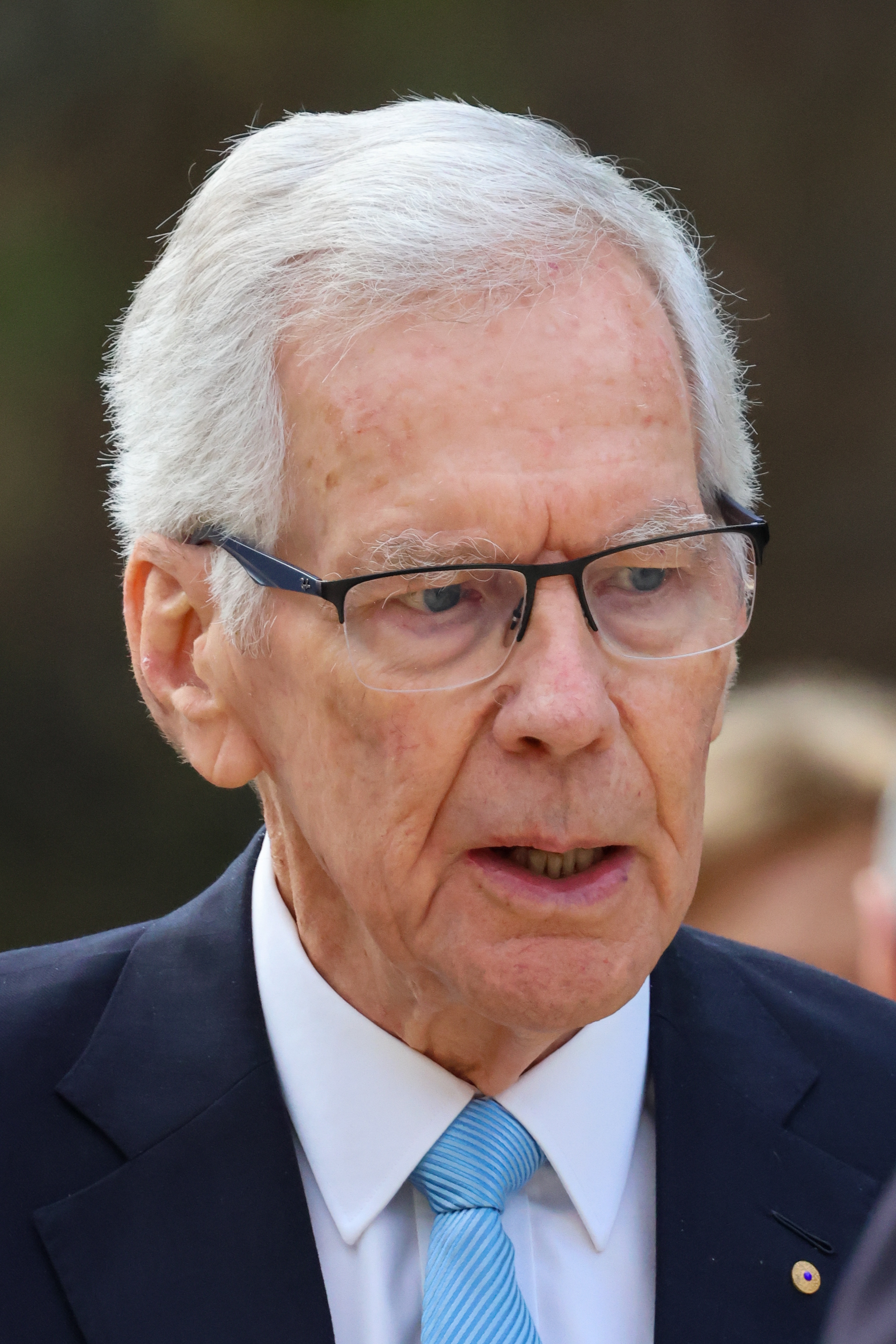
Brown at the Adelaide Festival Centre in 2026.

Dean Brown's political career was marked by his rivalry with John Olsen, the two representing the moderate and conservative wings of the South Australian Liberal Party respectively. He was first elected to the House of Assembly for the safe Liberal seat of Davenport in east Adelaide on 10 March 1973, and joined the Liberal Movement faction of the party. He served in the ministry of David Tonkin from 1979 to 1982. After Tonkin lost the 1982 election and retired from politics, Brown ran in the ensuing leadership contest, losing to Olsen. For the 1985 election, an electoral redistribution left both Brown and Stan Evans, the member for Fisher, vying for Liberal preselection in Davenport. In the ensuing factional battle (Evans is a member of the conservative wing), Brown won preselection, but Evans remained in the race as an "Independent Liberal." At the election, Brown suffered a swing of 30 percent on the primary vote and 24 percent on the two-party vote, enough to lose the seat to Evans.

Dean Brown returned to politics in 1992. The Labor government of John Bannon was embarrassed by the losses of the State Bank of South Australia, but incumbent Opposition Leader Dale Baker was unable to capitalize. Baker resigned and called a spill for all leadership positions. It initially appeared that Olsen, who had been appointed to the Australian Senate after losing the 1989 state election, would return to his old post with little difficulty. The Liberal Party's conservative faction persuaded former Deputy Premier Roger Goldsworthy to resign his safe seat of Kavel and hand it to Olsen. Baker, also from the conservative wing, intended to hand the leadership back to Olsen as soon as he was securely back in the legislature. However, a number of moderate Liberals were unwilling to let Olsen take the leadership unopposed. They persuaded leading party moderate Ted Chapman to stand down from his equally safe seat of Alexandra on the Fleurieu Peninsula and hand it to Brown so he could challenge Olsen for the leadership. This allowed both Brown and Olsen to re-enter parliament at by-elections on the same day, the 1992 Kavel by-election and 1992 Alexandra by-election respectively. In the ensuing ballot, Brown narrowly defeated Olsen.

Bannon retired in late 1992 and was succeeded by Lynn Arnold. However, Arnold was unable to change Labor's fortunes, and Brown went into the 1993 election as an unbackable favorite to be the state's next premier. At that election, Brown led the Liberals to one of the biggest landslides ever recorded at the state level in Australia. They took 14 seats from Labor and won a record 60.9 percent of the two-party vote. They also won all but nine seats in Adelaide, Labor's power base for more than half a century—in some cases, taking seats where Labor had not been seriously threatened in decades. At this election, Brown was elected for Finniss, a reconfigured version of Alexandra. With a 14-seat majority—the largest in South Australia's history—Brown seemed to be in a formidable position. Indeed, there was talk that the Liberals would be in power for a generation.

However, he had considerable difficulty reining in his large party room, which was torn by the factional battles that have long plagued the SA Liberals. He didn't seem to project an image of confident leadership. By late 1996, the Liberals' poll numbers were in clear decline. Well aware that the Liberals had a year at most to recover before the next election, two prominent moderate backbenchers, Joan Hall and Graham Ingerson, the latter having briefly served as Brown's deputy in Opposition, threw their support to Olsen. With Hall and Ingerson's backing, Olsen launched a successful party-room coup against Brown in November. Hall had been a staffer to then Opposition Leader Brown prior to the 1993 election which saw Hall being elected to Parliament. However despite Hall having previously worked on his staff, Brown as Premier did not promote Hall to his ministry and as a retaliation Hall switched her support to Olsen.

Brown became the first premier to leave office without facing an election since Crawford Vaughan.

As a concession to Brown, Olsen named Brown as Minister for Aboriginal Affairs in his government. After the Liberals were narrowly returned at the 1997 election, Brown became Minister for Human Services.

After Olsen was forced to resign as premier in 2001, Brown sought to regain the premiership but lost out to Deputy Premier Rob Kerin. As a concession to Brown, Kerin named Brown deputy leader of the Liberal Party, and hence Deputy Premier. He took on the added portfolios of Disability Services and Ageing. After the Liberal Party lost government at the 2002 election, Brown became Deputy Opposition Leader until 2005 when he announced that he would leave politics at the 2006 election, and resigned the deputy leadership.

In October 2007, Brown was appointed special drought adviser to South Australian Premier Mike Rann.

Political offices
Preceded by Lynn Arnold	Premier of South Australia; 1993–1996	Succeeded by John Olsen
Preceded by Rob Kerin	Deputy Premier of South Australia; 2001–2002	Succeeded by Kevin Foley
Preceded by Dale Baker	Leader of the Opposition in South Australia; 1992 – 1993	Succeeded by Lynn Arnold
Preceded by Annette Hurley	Deputy Leader of the Opposition in South Australia; 2002 – 2005	Succeeded by Iain Evans
Parliament of South Australia
Preceded by Joyce Steele	Member for Davenport; 1973–1985	Succeeded by Stan Evans
Preceded by Ted Chapman	Member for Alexandra; 1992–1993	District abolished
New district	Member for Finniss; 1993–2006	Succeeded by Michael Pengilly
Party political offices
Preceded by Dale Baker	Leader of the Liberal Party of Australia (South Australian Division); 1992–1996	Succeeded by John Olsen
