= South Australian Liberal Party =

South Australian Liberal Party Liberal Party of Australia (South Australian Division)
- Abbreviation: LCL (1932–1974)
- Leader: Ashton Hurn
- Deputy Leader: Josh Teague
- President: Alex Antic
- Founded: 9 June 1932; 94 years ago (Note: The official change to the "South Australian Liberal Party" was in July 1974; 52 years ago)
- Preceded by: Liberal Federation; Country
- Headquarters: 104 Greenhill Road, Unley, Adelaide, South Australia
- Youth wing: SA Young Liberal Movement
- Women's wing: Liberal Women's Council
- Ideology: Liberalism (Australian); Conservatism (Australian); Liberal conservatism
- Political position: Centre-right to right-wing
- National affiliation: Liberal Party of Australia
- Colours: Dark blue; Navy blue; Sky blue
- House of Assembly: 5 / 47
- Legislative Council: 6 / 22
- House of Representatives: 2 / 10 (South Australian seats)
- Senate: 5 / 12 (South Australian seats)

Website
- saliberal.org.au

Seats in local government
- Adelaide: 1 / 12
- Marion: 1 / 13
- Mount Barker: 1 / 11
- Onkaparinga: 2 / 13
- Port Pirie: 1 / 10
- Prospect: 1 / 9
- Tea Tree Gully: 6 / 14
- Unley: 3 / 13
- Victor Harbor: 1 / 10
- West Torrens: 1 / 15
- Charles Sturt: 1 / 17

The South Australian Liberal Party, officially known as the Liberal Party of Australia (South Australian Division), and often shortened to SA Liberals, is the South Australian Division of the Liberal Party of Australia. It was formed as the Liberal and Country League (LCL) in 1932 and became the South Australian Division of the Liberal Party when the Liberal Party was formed in 1945. It retained its Liberal and Country League name before changing to its current name in 1974. It is one of two major parties in the bicameral Parliament of South Australia, the other being the Australian Labor Party (SA Branch). The party is led by Ashton Hurn since 8 December 2025.

During its 42-year existence as the Liberal and Country League, it spent 34 years in government, mainly due to an electoral malapportionment scheme heavily favouring rural areas known as the Playmander. The Playmander was named after LCL leader Sir Tom Playford, who was the Premier of South Australia for 27 years, starting shortly after the 1938 election until his party was narrowly defeated at the 1965 election. The Playmander was dismantled by LCL leader Steele Hall after regaining government at the 1968 election, losing government again at the 1970 election. Since the rural malapportionment abolition and one vote one value adoption, the party has won just 4 of the 17 state elections: the 1979, 1993, 1997 and the 2018 elections.

== History ==
=== Formation ===
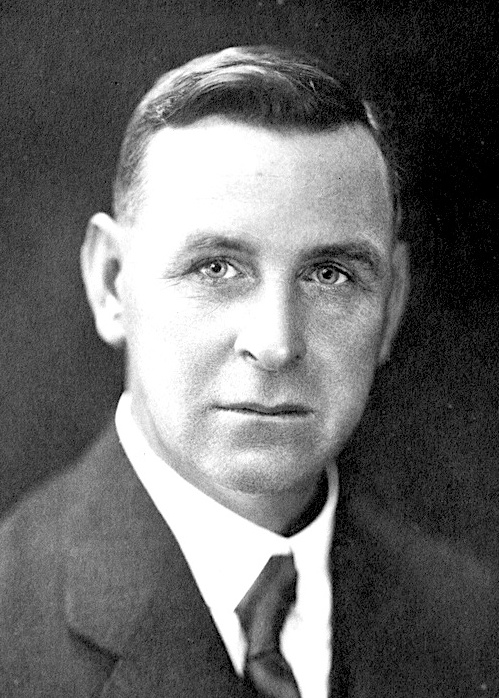
Sir Richard Layton Butler, LCL Founder and Premier 1933–1938

The Liberal and Country League had its roots in the Emergency Committee of South Australia, which ran as the main non-Labor party in South Australia at the 1931 federal election landslide. In the House of Representatives, it took an additional two seats to hold six of the state's seven seats. In the bloc-voting winner-take-all Senate, it took the three seats up for election.

Encouraged by this success, the Liberal Federation (the SA branch of the United Australia Party) and the SA Country Party merged to form the LCL on 9 June 1932, with former Liberal Federation leader Richard Layton Butler as its first leader. Liberal Federation itself was preceded by Liberal Union (1910–1923) with the latter created from a tri-merger between the Liberal and Democratic Union (formed 1906), the Farmers and Producers Political Union (formed 1904) and the National Defence League (formed 1891).

In its first electoral test, the 1933 state election, the LCL took advantage of a three-way split in the state Labor government to win a smashing victory, taking 29 seats versus only 13 for the three Labor factions combined. Butler then became the Premier of South Australia.

Traditionally a socially conservative party, the LCL contained relatively distinct factions whose ideologies often conflicted:

- Farmers, graziers and rural property owners.
- The Adelaide Establishment
- The urban middle class

The urban middle class continued to support the party although they had little say in its running. Indeed, it was not until the election of Robin Millhouse in 1955 that someone from this third faction was elected to parliament. Millhouse, often considered during his term as the most progressive member of the LCL, continually criticised the conservative wing of the party. He eventually resigned in 1973 and joined the splinter Liberal Movement party.

=== Playmander period ===
==== Early years ====
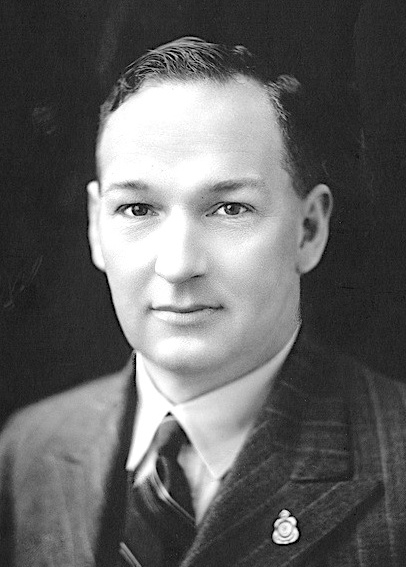
Sir Tom Playford, LCL Leader 1938–1966, Premier 1938–1965

The Butler LCL introduced the electoral malapportionment scheme later known as the Playmander in 1936. The House of Assembly was also reduced from 46 members elected from multi-member districts to 39 members elected from single-member electorates. The electorates consisted of rural districts enjoying a 2-to-1 advantage in the state parliament, even though they contained less than half of the population. Two-thirds of seats were to be located in rural areas ("the country"). This arrangement was retained even as Adelaide, the state capital, grew to two-thirds of the state's population.

Even allowing for a smaller chamber, the LCL suffered heavy losses at the 1938 election, winning just 15 of 39 seats. However, Labor picked up only a small number of additional seats. In an unprecedented result, the crossbench swelled massively, with no less than 14 independents elected from a combined independent primary vote of 40 percent, higher than either major party (33 percent for the LCL, 26 percent for Labor). Butler and the LCL had to rely on the crossbench for confidence and supply to remain in government. Only months later, Butler resigned in favour of Tom Playford to make an unsuccessful attempt to enter federal politics. From the 1941 election onward, the Playford LCL would regain and keep a parliamentary majority, albeit narrowly. Additionally, turnout crashed to a record-low 50 percent in 1941, triggering the Playford LCL to introduce compulsory voting from the 1944 election.

In January 1945, the Liberal and Country League became the South Australian division of the newly formed Liberal Party of Australia. However, the SA division continued to be known as the LCL.

==== Effects on elections ====
Under the scheme, a vote in a low-population rural seat had anywhere from double to ten times the value of a vote in a high-population metropolitan seat. For example, at the 1968 election the rural seat of Frome had 4,500 formal votes, while the metropolitan seat of Enfield had 42,000 formal votes. The scheme allowed LCL to win sufficient parliamentary seats even when it lost the two-party vote to Labor opposition by comprehensive margins at several elections: 1944, 1953, 1962 and 1968. For instance, in the 1944 and 1953 elections, Labor took 53 percent of the two-party vote, which would have normally been enough to deliver a solid majority for the Labor leader–Robert Richards in 1944 and Mick O'Halloran in 1953. However, on both occasions, the LCL managed to just barely hold onto power. By the 1950s, a number of Labor figures had despaired of ever winning power. O'Halleran, for instance, felt he needed to maintain a cordial relationship with Playford in hopes of getting Labor-friendly legislation through the House of Assembly.

Playford had become synonymous with the LCL over his record 27-year tenure as Premier of South Australia. The LCL became so strongly identified with Playford that during election campaigns, it branded itself as "The Playford Liberal and Country League". Playford gave the impression that the LCL membership were there solely to raise money and run election campaigns; his grip on the party was such that he frequently ignored LCL convention decisions. This treatment of rank and file party members continued to cause resentment throughout the party. This split mirrored the dissatisfaction amongst the Establishment faction, which had been steadily losing its power within the party and was appalled at the "nouveau riche (new money) commoners", such as Millhouse, that had infiltrated the parliamentary wing of the LCL.

==== Fall from power ====
The LCL's grip on power began to slip in the 1950s; they would lose seats in every election from 1953 onward. Even at the height of Playford's popularity, the LCL was almost nonexistent in Adelaide, winning almost no seats in the capital outside the wealthy "eastern crescent" and the area around Glenelg and Holdfast Bay. Due to its paper-thin base in the capital, Playford's LCL often won just barely enough seats to govern alone; the party never held more than 23 seats at any time during Playford's tenure. Despite this, the LCL party machine had become moribund as leaders had become lulled into a false sense of security due to the extended run of election wins aided by the Playmander. The LCL was thus caught unawares when O'Halloran's successor as state Labor leader, Frank Walsh, eschewed a statewide campaign in favour of targeting marginal LCL seats.

Walsh's strategy almost paid off at the 1962 election. Labor won a decisive 54.3 percent of the two-party preferred vote to the LCL's 45.7 percent. In the rest of Australia, this would have been enough for a comprehensive Labor victory. However, due to the Playmander, Labor only picked up a two-seat swing, leaving it one short of a majority. The two independents threw their support to the LCL, allowing Playford to remain in office. This election showed how grossly distorted the Playmander had become; by this time, Adelaide accounted for two-thirds of the state's population, but elected only one-third of the legislature. A year later, the LCL received another jolt with the reformation of a separate Country Party. Although a shadow of its former self, the reformed Country Party served as a wakeup call to Playford that there were problems within the LCL.

Labor finally beat the Playmander against the odds at the 1965 election. Despite winning the same two-party vote as it had three years earlier, the Playmander was strong enough that Labor was only able to win government by two seats. Playford resigned as party leader in 1966 and was succeeded by Steele Hall.

==== Dismantling Playmander ====
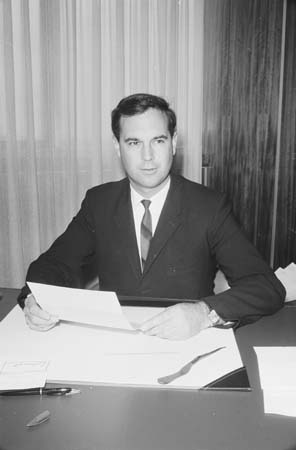
Steele Hall, LCL Leader 1966–1972, Premier 1968–1970

At the 1968 election, Labor won a 53.2 percent two-party vote to the LCL's 46.8 percent, but suffered a two-seat swing, resulting in a hung parliament. The lone independent in the chamber, Tom Stott, threw his support to the LCL, allowing Hall to form a minority government. Hall was embarrassed that his party was in a position to win power despite having clearly lost the vote. Concerned by the level of publicity and public protest about the issue, Hall committed himself to reducing the rural weighting. Under his watch, the lower house was expanded 39 to 47 seats, 28 of which were located in Adelaide. It fell short of "one vote one value", as Labor had demanded, since rural areas were still over-represented.

Nonetheless, with Adelaide now electing a majority of the legislature, conventional wisdom held that Hall knew he was effectively handing the premiership to Labor leader Don Dunstan at the next election. That election took place in 1970 when Stott crossed the floor to vote against the LCL. As expected, the LCL was defeated. Hall remained as the Leader of the Opposition. One vote one value would later be introduced by Labor following the 1975 election.

The party's problems had already emerged in public spats, most notably the formation of the Liberal Movement, a socially progressive or "small-l liberal" wing of the LCL in 1972. The divisions culminated in the Liberal Movement becoming a separate party in 1973, with Hall and fellow parliamentarians Martin Cameron and Robin Millhouse resigning from the LCL to join the newly formed party. Hall claimed that the Party had 'lost its idealism [and] forgotten...its purpose for existence'.

Bruce Eastick succeeded Hall as LCL leader after Hall's resignation from the party in 1973.

=== Liberal Party ===
==== Renaming to the Liberal Party ====
During Eastick's leadership, the Liberal and Country League assembled at a meeting of the State Council on 22 July 1974 to rename itself to "Liberal Party of Australia (South Australian Division)". The renaming initiative was welcomed by federal Liberal leader and opposition leader Billy Snedden, who was present at the meeting. The party also revised its constitution, adopted a new platform, appointed new young party officials and organisers, modelling after the Victorian Liberals.

In July 1975, David Tonkin challenged Eastick for party leadership, and became leader unopposed after Eastick stood aside. This would be the last time that a Liberal leader was elected unopposed until 2013.

Hall's Liberal Movement dissolved in 1976 and three of its four state parliamentary members (Martin Cameron, John Carnie, David Boundy) rejoined the Liberal Party. Hall, who was elected to the Senate in 1974 and 1975 as a Liberal Movement member, also rejoined the Liberal Party and joined the federal Liberal Party room. The remaining Liberal Movement state parliamentary member was Millhouse, who refused to rejoin the Liberal Party, founding the New Liberal Movement instead. His new party merged with the Australia Party a year later in 1977 to become the Australian Democrats.

One vote one value was introduced by Labor following the 1975 election where the Liberal Party won a 50.8 percent two-party vote but fell one seat short of forming government. Labor would regain their vote and majority at the 1977 election, however Dunstan resigned in the months prior to the 1979 election where the Liberals won government for one term.

==== Tonkin Government (1979–1982) ====
At that election, David Tonkin, who succeeded Eastick as party leader in 1975, led the Liberals to victory against a weakened Labor Party. It was the first time in 20 years that the non-Labor side in South Australia had won the most seats while also winning a majority of the vote. However, despite winning 55 percent of the two-party vote, the largest two-party-preferred margin since the end of the Playmander at the time, the Liberals only won 25 of the 47 seats. This was because the "one vote one value" reforms left most of the Liberal vote locked in comfortably safe rural seats. Despite taking six seats off Labor, the Liberals only won 13 seats in Adelaide. As a result, despite winning a margin that would have been large enough for a strong majority government in the rest of Australia, the Liberals won only 25 seats, a bare majority of two.

Tonkin survived for only one term before the early 1980s recession resulted in him narrowly losing the 1982 election to Labor under John Bannon.

==== Opposition (1982–1993) ====
John Olsen succeeded Tonkin as leader in 1982, and led the Liberals to defeats at the 1985 and 1989. In the latter, the Liberals won a bare majority of the two-party vote. However, much of that majority was wasted on landslides in their rural heartland, allowing Labor to eke out a two-seat majority.

Olsen resigned to take up a Senate seat soon afterward, and was succeeded by Dale Baker. By 1992, however, Baker had been unable to gain much ground on Labor despite festering anger over its handling of the collapse of the State Bank of South Australia. Baker resigned as leader and called for a spill of all leadership positions. Olsen resigned from the Senate soon afterward, and Baker intended to hand the leadership back to Olsen as soon as Olsen was safely back in the legislature. This gambit backfired, however, when former Tonkin minister Dean Brown returned to politics after a seven-year absence. Olsen, like Baker, was from the conservative wing of the party, while Brown was from the moderate wing. Brown narrowly defeated Olsen in the leadership vote.

==== Brown and Olsen Governments (1993–2002) ====
The Liberals went into the 1993 election as unbackable favourites. At that election, Brown won one of the most comprehensive state-level victories since Federation, taking 37 seats on 60.9 percent of the two-party vote and a swing of almost nine percent–in all three cases, the largest on record in South Australia. Along the way, the Liberals won all but nine seats in Adelaide, a city where they had been all but nonexistent even after adopting the Liberal banner.

These figures led to talk of a generation of Liberal government in South Australia, much as the 1970s had been considered a "Dunstan Decade." However, Brown was unable to rein in the factional battles in his large party room. By late 1996, the Liberals' poll numbers had tailed off markedly less than a year before a statutory general election. This led two of Brown's fellow moderates, Joan Hall and Graham Ingerson, to throw their support to Olsen, which was enough for Olsen to defeat Brown in a leadership spill.

At the 1997 state election, the Liberals withstood a swing slightly larger than the one that swept them to power four years earlier, this time 9.4 percent. However, they only lost 11 seats, allowing Olsen to cling to power with a minority government supported by conservative crossbenchers.

Olsen was forced to resign in 2001 after a finding that he had misled the House about the Motorola affair. He was succeeded by Deputy Premier Rob Kerin.

==== Opposition (2002–2018) ====
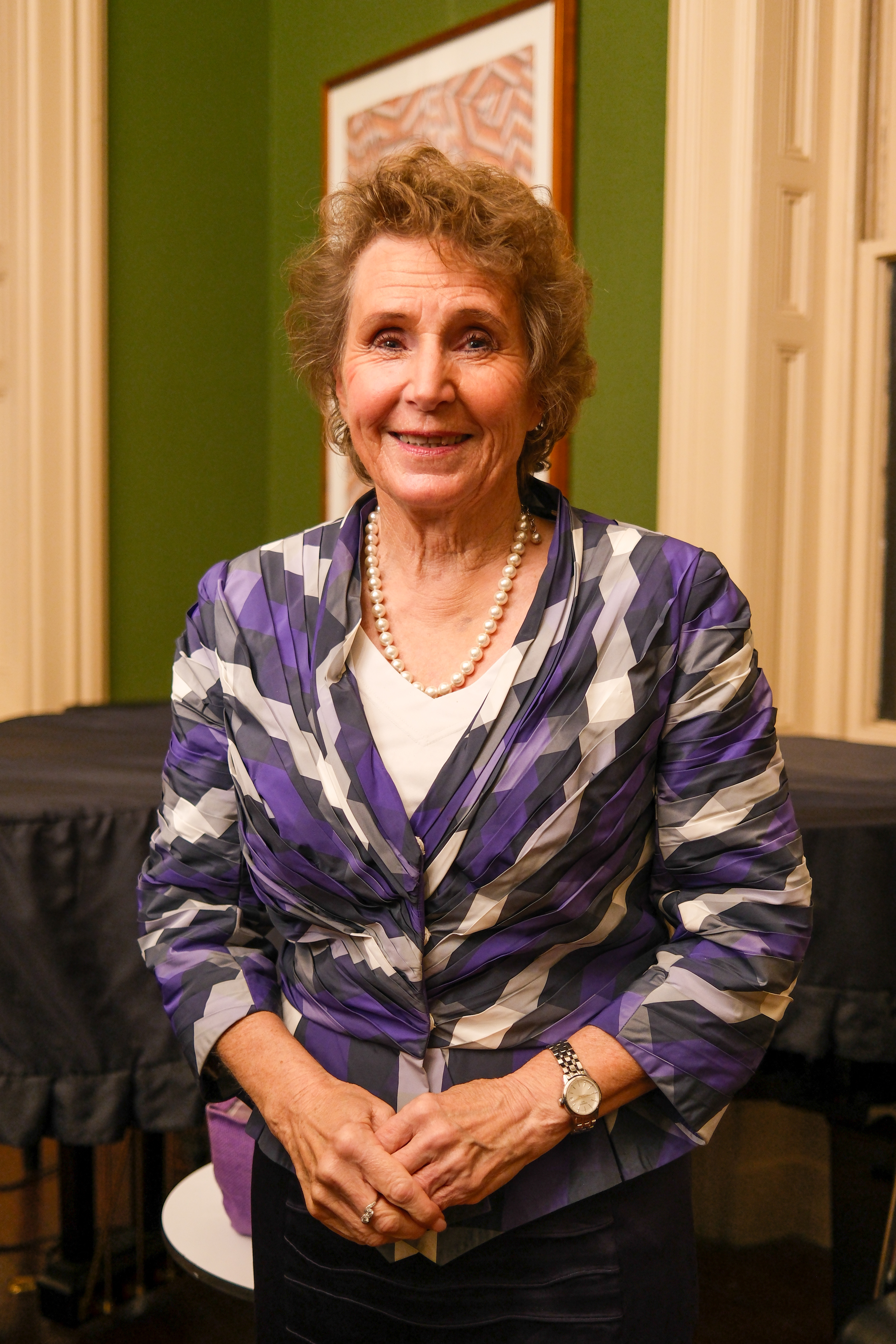
Isobel Redmond, the first female LCL Leader 2009–2013

Kerin only held office for three months before leading the Liberals into a statutory general election in 2002. The Liberals lost two seats to Labor, but won a paper-thin majority of the two-party vote. The balance of power rested with four conservative crossbenchers. They unexpectedly announced their support for Labor, making Labor leader Mike Rann premier-designate by one seat. However, Kerin announced that he still had a mandate to govern based on winning the two-party vote. He insisted that he would not resign unless Rann demonstrated he had support on the House floor to govern. Three weeks of deadlock ended in March, when Kerin called a confidence motion in his own government. He lost, and stood down in favour of Rann.

Kerin resigned as leader following a landslide loss in 2006. Factional battles resulted in three leaders in less than three years–Iain Evans, Martin Hamilton-Smith and the party's first female leader, Isobel Redmond.

The last serving parliamentarian from the LCL era, Graham Gunn, retired in 2010; he had been elected in 1970, the next-to-last election that the party fought under the LCL banner.

On 4 February 2013, Steven Marshall was elected unopposed as Liberal leader. Vickie Chapman was elected as deputy leader after a contest with former party leader Iain Evans.

At the 2014 election, under Steven Marshall's leadership the Liberals won a total 22 seats and 53% of Two-party-preferred vote against the Labor Party but failed to formed a minority government with the two independents who were elected.

==== Marshall Government (2018–2022) ====
At the 2018 election, Steven Marshall led the Liberals to victory after winning 25 seats, despite a swing against it and the Labor Party, following the newly created centralist party SA Best led by Nick Xenophon contesting 36 of the 47 seats. It was the first time since 2002 that the non-Labor side in South Australia had won the most seats while also winning a majority of the Two-party-preferred vote. At 2002 election the Liberal party won 20 seats whilst 3 independents and one Nationals were also elected. The Marshall government was defeated after one term at the 2022 election after winning only 16 seats out of the total of 47. The Two-party-preferred vote had dropped to 45.41% after a swing against of 6.52%.

==== Opposition (2022–present) ====
Following the election defeat at the 2022 state election, Marshall resigned as leader of the party. In April 2022, David Speirs was elected as party leader, securing 18 votes compared to Josh Teague's five and Nick McBride's one. John Gardner was elected as deputy party leader.

David Speirs resigned as Liberal leader on the 8th of August, 2024, announcing that "I don't have the energy to fight for a leadership that quite frankly in the current circumstances I just don't want to pursue any more." His successor, Vincent Tarzia, MP for Hartley, was elected leader on August 12th, defeating fellow Moderate Josh Teague by 18 votes to four. On August 19th, Tarzia unveiled his new cabinet.

Both Marshall’s Dunstan seat and Speirs’ Black seat were lost to Labor in subsequent by-elections. In January 2025, Jing Lee announced her resignation from SA Liberal party to become independent.

At the 2026 South Australian state election the Liberal Party, led by Ashton Hurn, suffered a large swing against it and received less primary votes than right-wing populist party One Nation. This marks the first time the Liberal Party have finished outside the top two highest parties by vote share at a South Australian election.

=== Ideology divisions ===
In the 1990s and 2000s, ongoing division continued based on both ideologies and personalities, with sides forming between the moderate Chapman and conservative Evans family dynasties, complicated further by the moderate Brown and conservative Olsen rifts.

During the 2010s, Christopher Pyne and Simon Birmingham were a prominent figures of the moderates while Cory Bernardi was a prominent figure of the conservatives. Barnardi would later leave the Liberal Party.

During the 2020s, Alex Antic is the most prominent conservative.

== Party leaders ==
Parliamentary Party Leader
- Incumbent; Ashton Hurn since 8 December 2025
- Deputy: Josh Teague

Since the 1970s, five parliamentary Liberal leaders have served as Premier of South Australia: David Tonkin (1979–1982), Dean Brown (1993–1996), John Olsen (1996–2001), Rob Kerin (2001–2002) and Steven Marshall (2018–2022). All leaders have served as Leader of the Opposition.

=== Leader ===
Party leader	Assumed office	Left office	Premier	Reason for departure
Richard Layton Butler	9 June 1932	3 November 1938	1932–1938	Resigned to contest the 1938 Wakefield federal by-election
Sir Tom Playford	3 November 1938	13 July 1966	1938–1965	Resigned after 1965 election loss
Steele Hall	13 July 1966	15 March 1972	1968–1970	Resigned
Bruce Eastick	15 March 1972	24 July 1975		Resigned following party room challenge from Tonkin, after 1975 election loss
David Tonkin	24 July 1975	10 November 1982	1979–1982	Resigned after 1982 election loss
John Olsen	10 November 1982	12 January 1990		Resigned after 1989 election loss
Dale Baker	12 January 1990	11 May 1992		Resigned, endorsed Olsen to succeed him
Dean Brown	11 May 1992	28 November 1996	1993–1996	Lost party room challenge to Olsen
John Olsen	28 November 1996	22 October 2001	1996–2001	Resigned as premier due to Motorola affair
Rob Kerin	22 October 2001	29 March 2006	2001–2002	Resigned after 2006 election loss
Iain Evans	29 March 2006	12 April 2007		Lost party room challenge to Hamilton-Smith
Martin Hamilton-Smith	12 April 2007	8 July 2009		Resigned following unsatisfying party room vote for his leadership.
Isobel Redmond	8 July 2009	31 January 2013		Resigned
Steven Marshall	4 February 2013	19 April 2022	2018–2022	Resigned after 2022 election loss
David Speirs	19 April 2022	8 August 2024		Resigned
Vincent Tarzia	12 August 2024	5 December 2025		Resigned
Ashton Hurn	8 December 2025			

=== Deputy Leader ===
The deputy leader usually serves as Deputy Premier while the Liberal Party is in government. This list includes leaders of the LCL.

Party deputy leader	Assumed office	Left office	Deputy Premier
Sir Glen Pearson	15 March 1965	2 June 1970	
Robin Millhouse	2 June 1970	19 March 1973	
John Coumbe	19 March 1973	24 July 1975	
Roger Goldsworthy	24 July 1975	12 January 1990	1979–1982
Stephen Baker	12 January 1990	28 November 1996	1993–1996
Graham Ingerson	28 November 1996	7 July 1998	1996–1998
Rob Kerin	7 July 1998	22 October 2001	1998–2001
Dean Brown	22 October 2001	21 November 2005	2001–2002
Iain Evans	21 November 2005	30 March 2006	
Vickie Chapman	30 March 2006	4 July 2009	
Isobel Redmond	4 July 2009	8 July 2009	
Steven Griffiths	8 July 2009	30 March 2010	
Martin Hamilton-Smith	30 March 2010	6 April 2010	
Mitch Williams	6 April 2010	23 October 2012	
Steven Marshall	23 October 2012	4 February 2013	
Vickie Chapman	4 February 2013	25 November 2021	2018–2021
Dan van Holst Pellekaan	25 November 2021	19 April 2022	2021–2022
John Gardner	19 April 2022	18 December 2024	
Josh Teague	18 December 2024	present	

== Current federal parliamentarians ==
=== Representatives ===
- Tony Pasin – Barker MP since 2013
- Tom Venning – Grey MP since 2025

=== Senators ===
- Anne Ruston – Senator since 2012
- Alex Antic – Senator since 2019
- Andrew McLachlan – Senator since 2020
- Kerrynne Liddle – Senator since 2022
- Leah Blyth – Senator since 2025

== Electoral performance ==
The Playmander began in 1936 and ended after 1968. Compulsory voting was introduced at the 1944 election.

=== House of Assembly ===
Election	Leader	Votes	%	Seats	+/–	Position	Status
1933	Richard L. Butler	60,159	34.6	29 / 46	▲29	▲1st	Majority
1938	Richard L. Butler	72,998	33.4	15 / 39	▼14	1st	Minority
1941	Tom Playford	63,317	37.6	20 / 39	▲5	1st	Majority
1944	Tom Playford	113,536	45.8	20 / 39	0	1st	Majority
1947	Tom Playford	111,216	40.4	23 / 39	▲3	1st	Majority
1950	Tom Playford	113,673	40.5	23 / 39	0	1st	Majority
1953	Tom Playford	119,106	36.5	21 / 39	▼2	1st	Majority
1956	Tom Playford	100,569	36.7	21 / 39	0	1st	Majority
1959	Tom Playford	143,710	37.0	20 / 39	▼1	1st	Majority
1962	Tom Playford	140,507	34.5	18 / 39	▼2	▼2nd	Minority
1965	Tom Playford	179,183	35.9	17 / 39	▼1	2nd	Opposition
1968	Steele Hall	246,560	43.8	19 / 39	▲2	2nd	Minority
1970	Steele Hall	258,856	43.8	20 / 47	▲1	2nd	Opposition
1973	Bruce Eastick	250,312	39.8	20 / 47	0	2nd	Opposition
1975	Bruce Eastick	218,820	31.5	20 / 47	0	2nd	Opposition
1977	David Tonkin	306,356	41.2	17 / 47	▼3	2nd	Opposition
1979	David Tonkin	352,343	47.9	24 / 47	▲7	2nd	Majority
1982	David Tonkin	326,372	42.7	21 / 47	▼3	2nd	Opposition
1985	John Olsen	344,337	42.2	16 / 47	▼5	2nd	Opposition
1989	John Olsen	381,834	44.2	22 / 47	▲6	▲1st	Opposition
1993	Dean Brown	481,623	52.8	37 / 47	▲15	1st	Majority
1997	John Olsen	359,509	40.4	23 / 47	▼14	1st	Minority
2002	Rob Kerin	378,929	39.9	20 / 47	▼3	▼2nd	Opposition
2006	Rob Kerin	319,041	34.0	15 / 47	▼5	2nd	Opposition
2010	Isobel Redmond	408,482	41.7	18 / 47	▲3	2nd	Opposition
2014	Steven Marshall	455,797	44.8	22 / 47	▲4	2nd	Opposition
2018	Steven Marshall	398,182	38.0	25 / 47	▲3	▲1st	Majority
2022	Steven Marshall	389,059	35.7	16 / 47	▼9	▼2nd	Opposition
2026	Ashton Hurn	211,551	18.9	5 / 47	▼11	▼3rd	Opposition

== See also ==
- 2026 South Australian state election
- 2022 South Australian state election
- Members of the South Australian House of Assembly, 2022–2026
- Members of the South Australian Legislative Council, 2022–2026
- Australian Labor Party (South Australian Branch)
- Playmander, the 1936–1968 electoral malapportionment
- List of elections in South Australia
