= Results of the 2002 South Australian state election (House of Assembly) =

South Australian state election, 9 February 2002 House of Assembly << 1997–2006 >>
Enrolled voters	1,045,563				
Votes cast	978,569		Turnout	93.59	+1.84
Informal votes	30,537		Informal	3.12	-0.92
Summary of votes by party
Party	Primary votes	%	Swing	Seats	Change
Liberal	378,929	39.97	-0.43	20	3
Labor	344,559	36.34	+1.18	23	+ 2
Democrats	71,026	7.49	-8.95	0	± 0
Family First	25,025	2.64	+2.64	0	± 0
One Nation	22,833	2.41	+2.41	0	± 0
Greens	22,332	2.36	+2.15	0	± 0
SA First	16,902	1.78	+1.78	0	± 0
National	13,748	1.45	-0.29	1	± 0
Independent	40,288	4.25	+1.12	3	+ 2
Other	12,390	1.38	*	0	± 0
Total	948,032			47	
Two-party-preferred
Labor	465,227	49.07	+0.58		
Liberal	482,805	50.93	–0.58		

This is a list of House of Assembly results for the 2002 South Australian state election.

== Results by electoral district ==
=== Adelaide ===
2002 South Australian state election: Adelaide
Party	Candidate	Votes	%	±%
Liberal	Michael Harbison	8,621	42.4	−1.3
Labor	Jane Lomax-Smith	8,215	40.4	+6.8
Democrats	Cherie Prosser	1,197	5.9	−11.0
Greens	Jake Bugden	1,058	5.2	+0.1
No Hoo Haa	Albert Bensimon	492	2.4	+2.4
Family First	Andrea Mason	310	1.5	+1.5
SA First	Ben Krieg	236	1.2	+1.2
One Nation	Roy Bedford	143	0.7	+0.7
Independent	Tom Bertuleit	61	0.3	+0.3
Total formal votes		20,333	96.4	−0.4
Informal votes		774	3.6	+0.4
Turnout		21,107	91.7	+1.2
Two-party-preferred result
Labor	Jane Lomax-Smith	10,375	51.0	+3.2
Liberal	Michael Harbison	9,958	49.0	−3.2
Labor gain from Liberal		Swing	+3.2	

=== Ashford ===
2002 South Australian state election: Ashford
Party	Candidate	Votes	%	±%
Labor	Steph Key	8,425	40.7	+10.2
Liberal	Peter Panagaris	7,682	37.1	+2.5
Democrats	Sue Mann	1,987	9.6	−2.2
Greens	Michelle Drummond	1,111	5.4	+5.4
Family First	James Troup	632	3.0	+3.0
SA First	Paul Vanderkop	559	2.7	+2.7
One Nation	Jos Underhill	326	1.6	+1.6
Total formal votes		20,722	96.5	+0.5
Informal votes		744	3.5	−0.5
Turnout		21,466	92.7	+1.4
Two-party-preferred result
Labor	Steph Key	11,118	53.7	+0.8
Liberal	Peter Panagaris	9,604	46.3	−0.8
Labor hold		Swing	+0.8	

=== Bragg ===
2002 South Australian state election: Bragg
Party	Candidate	Votes	%	±%
Liberal	Vickie Chapman	12,568	61.9	+0.4
Labor	Karen Atherton	4,267	21.0	+1.1
Democrats	Julia Grant	2,150	10.6	−7.4
SA First	John Wood	614	3.0	+3.0
Family First	Jamilah Lovibond	551	2.7	+2.7
One Nation	Betty Bedford	169	0.8	+0.8
Total formal votes		20,319	97.9	
Informal votes		430	2.1	
Turnout		20,749	93.0	
Two-party-preferred result
Liberal	Vickie Chapman	14,143	69.6	−0.4
Labor	Karen Atherton	6,176	30.4	+0.4
Liberal hold		Swing	−0.4	

=== Bright ===
2002 South Australian state election: Bright
Party	Candidate	Votes	%	±%
Liberal	Wayne Matthew	9,086	44.6	−1.0
Labor	Ron Baronian	6,784	33.3	+1.3
Democrats	Fiona Blinco	1,672	8.2	−12.8
Greens	Bob Darlington	961	4.7	+4.7
Family First	Vasiliki Savvas	593	2.9	+2.9
SA First	Kathy Williams	476	2.3	+2.3
One Nation	Laurel Payne	403	2.0	+2.0
Independent	Cheryl Connor	390	1.9	+1.9
Total formal votes		20,365	96.9	
Informal votes		657	3.1	
Turnout		21,022	94.1	
Two-party-preferred result
Liberal	Wayne Matthew	11,192	55.0	+0.6
Labor	Ron Baronian	9,173	45.0	−0.6
Liberal hold		Swing	+0.6	

=== Chaffey ===
2002 South Australian state election: Chaffey
Party	Candidate	Votes	%	±%
National	Karlene Maywald	9,929	49.2	+12.4
Liberal	Kent Andrew	6,337	31.4	−10.5
Labor	Waluwe Simpson-Lyttle	2,419	12.0	−2.0
Democrats	Graham McNaughton	800	4.0	−3.2
One Nation	Shirley Faulkner	676	3.4	+3.4
Total formal votes		20,161	97.5	
Informal votes		526	2.5	
Turnout		20,687	93.5	
Two-party-preferred result
National	Karlene Maywald	12,899	64.0	+11.5
Liberal	Kent Andrew	7,262	36.0	−11.5
National hold		Swing	+11.5	

=== Cheltenham ===
2002 South Australian state election: Cheltenham
Party	Candidate	Votes	%	±%
Labor	Jay Weatherill	9,457	48.6	−6.4
Liberal	Sue Lawrie	4,627	23.8	−1.2
Independent	Murray De Laine	1,886	9.7	+9.7
Democrats	Cheryl Glenie	1,329	6.8	−9.0
SA First	Alex Alexander	847	4.3	+4.3
Greens	Anne McMenamin	588	3.0	+3.0
One Nation	Sarah Gibson	391	2.0	+2.0
Independent	Nugget Cooke	348	1.8	+1.8
Total formal votes		19,473	94.1	
Informal votes		1,213	5.9	
Turnout		20,686	93.0	
Two-party-preferred result
Labor	Jay Weatherill	12,986	66.7	+0.1
Liberal	Sue Lawrie	6,487	33.3	−0.1
Labor hold		Swing	+0.1	

=== Colton ===
2002 South Australian state election: Colton
Party	Candidate	Votes	%	±%
Labor	Paul Caica	8,235	41.7	+5.8
Liberal	John Behenna	7,650	38.8	−1.0
Greens	Jim Douglas	1,077	5.5	+5.5
Independent	Joe Ienco	1,038	5.3	+5.3
Democrats	Caroline Dowd	865	4.4	−8.7
Family First	Andrew Lewis	480	2.4	+2.4
One Nation	Andrew Phillips	220	1.1	+1.1
SA First	Desi d'Orsay-Lawrence	116	0.6	+0.6
Independent	Alison Patterson	52	0.3	+0.3
Total formal votes		19,733	95.5	
Informal votes		939	4.5	
Turnout		20,672	94.3	
Two-party-preferred result
Labor	Paul Caica	10,765	54.6	+5.6
Liberal	John Behenna	8,968	45.4	−5.6
Labor gain from Liberal		Swing	+5.6	

=== Croydon ===
2002 South Australian state election: Croydon
Party	Candidate	Votes	%	±%
Labor	Michael Atkinson	12,024	60.3	−2.5
Liberal	Angus Bristow	4,926	24.7	+0.5
Democrats	Daryl Owen	1,568	7.9	−5.1
SA First	James England	708	3.6	+3.6
Independent	Jessica Gosnell	401	2.0	+2.0
One Nation	John Victorsen	308	1.5	+1.5
Total formal votes		19,935	96.2	
Informal votes		782	3.8	
Turnout		20,717	93.1	
Two-party-preferred result
Labor	Michael Atkinson	13,766	69.1	−2.1
Liberal	Angus Bristow	6,169	30.9	+2.1
Labor hold		Swing	−2.1	

=== Davenport ===
2002 South Australian state election: Davenport
Party	Candidate	Votes	%	±%
Liberal	Iain Evans	10,337	51.8	+2.6
Labor	Gerry Bowen	4,563	22.8	+0.6
Democrats	Yvonne Caddy	3,369	16.9	−3.3
Independent	Ralph Hahnheuser	540	2.7	+2.7
SA First	Brenton Chappell	533	2.7	+2.7
Independent	Moira Humphries	365	1.8	+1.8
One Nation	F. Vandenbroek	263	1.3	+1.3
Total formal votes		19,970	97.7	
Informal votes		477	2.3	
Turnout		20,447	94.1	
Two-party-preferred result
Liberal	Iain Evans	12,289	61.5	+7.1
Labor	Gerry Bowen	7,681	38.5	+38.5
Liberal hold		Swing	N/A	

=== Elder ===
2002 South Australian state election: Elder
Party	Candidate	Votes	%	±%
Labor	Patrick Conlon	8,672	43.6	+8.6
Liberal	Heidi Harris	7,545	38.0	+0.8
Democrats	Greg Croke	1,340	6.7	−6.3
Family First	Peter Heaven	817	4.1	+4.1
Greens	Kate Cooper	777	3.9	+3.9
SA First	Bob Stewart	382	1.9	+1.9
One Nation	Colin Roediger	264	1.3	+1.3
Independent	Mnem Giles	78	0.4	+0.4
Total formal votes		19,875	95.8	
Informal votes		865	4.2	
Turnout		20,740	93.5	
Two-party-preferred result
Labor	Patrick Conlon	10,666	53.7	+1.8
Liberal	Heidi Harris	9,209	46.3	−1.8
Labor hold		Swing	+1.8	

=== Elizabeth ===
2002 South Australian state election: Elizabeth
Party	Candidate	Votes	%	±%
Labor	Lea Stevens	9,107	44.7	−1.4
Liberal	Ron Watts	7,111	34.9	+1.8
Family First	Peter Barnes	1,523	7.5	+7.5
Democrats	Anna Lukasiewicz	1,430	7.0	−12.2
SA First	Duncan MacMillan	624	3.1	+3.1
One Nation	Robert Fechner	580	2.8	+2.8
Total formal votes		20,375	96.7	
Informal votes		706	3.3	
Turnout		21,081	94.2	
Two-party-preferred result
Labor	Lea Stevens	11,649	57.2	−1.6
Liberal	Ron Watts	8,726	42.8	+1.6
Labor hold		Swing	−1.6	

=== Enfield ===
2002 South Australian state election: Enfield
Party	Candidate	Votes	%	±%
Labor	John Rau	7,827	39.5	−16.5
Liberal	Doster Mitchell	4,779	24.1	−1.1
Independent	Ralph Clarke	4,575	23.1	+23.1
Democrats	Alex Angas	1,201	6.1	−9.8
Family First	Lorraine Evans	1,052	5.3	+5.3
One Nation	Barbara Kirvan	401	2.0	+2.0
Total formal votes		19,835	96.0	
Informal votes		831	4.0	
Turnout		20,666	92.4	
Two-party-preferred result
Labor	John Rau	13,063	65.9	−2.2
Liberal	Doster Mitchell	6,772	34.1	+2.2
Labor hold		Swing	−2.2	

=== Finniss ===
2002 South Australian state election: Finniss
Party	Candidate	Votes	%	±%
Liberal	Dean Brown	11,616	55.9	+0.3
Labor	Graham Hockley	4,435	21.3	+0.6
Democrats	John Lavers	1,895	9.1	−14.5
Greens	Matt Rigney	1,118	5.4	+5.4
Family First	Bill Megaritis	1,034	5.0	+5.0
One Nation	Joy Rayner	699	3.4	+3.4
Total formal votes		20,797	97.2	
Informal votes		609	2.8	
Turnout		21,406	94.4	
Two-party-preferred result
Liberal	Dean Brown	13,647	65.6	+8.1
Labor	Graham Hockley	7,150	34.4	+34.4
Liberal hold		Swing	N/A	

=== Fisher ===
2002 South Australian state election: Fisher
Party	Candidate	Votes	%	±%
Independent	Bob Such	6,708	33.5	+33.5
Liberal	Susan Jeanes	6,275	31.3	−17.5
Labor	Alex Zimmermann	4,422	22.1	−6.4
Democrats	Jason Smith	1,323	6.6	−16.1
Family First	Kylie Borg	764	3.8	+3.8
One Nation	Trevor Mullins	292	1.5	+1.5
SA First	John Chudzicki	258	1.3	+1.3
Total formal votes		20,042	97.1	
Informal votes		599	2.9	
Turnout		20,641	94.3	
Notional two-party-preferred count
Liberal	Susan Jeanes	11,173	55.7	−4.1
Labor	Alex Zimmermann	8,869	44.3	+4.1
Two-candidate-preferred result
Independent	Bob Such	12,439	62.1	+62.1
Liberal	Susan Jeanes	7,603	37.9	−21.3
Independent gain from Liberal		Swing	N/A	

=== Flinders ===
2002 South Australian state election: Flinders
Party	Candidate	Votes	%	±%
Liberal	Liz Penfold	13,373	65.3	+11.7
Labor	John Lovegrove	3,318	16.2	+5.4
National	Grantley Siviour	1,881	9.2	−15.9
Democrats	Sally Tonkin	1,242	6.1	−0.1
One Nation	Charles Kirvan	662	3.2	+3.2
Total formal votes		20,476	98.2	
Informal votes		385	1.8	
Turnout		20,861	92.9	
Two-party-preferred result
Liberal	Liz Penfold	16,047	78.4	+18.4
Labor	John Lovegrove	4,429	21.6	+21.6
Liberal hold		Swing	N/A	

=== Florey ===
2002 South Australian state election: Florey
Party	Candidate	Votes	%	±%
Labor	Frances Bedford	8,414	43.2	+5.1
Liberal	Lyn Petrie	7,096	36.4	−0.8
Democrats	Paul Rowse	1,341	6.9	−9.2
Family First	Rob Pillar	1,294	6.6	+6.6
Greens	Lisa Blake	718	3.7	+3.7
One Nation	Victor Horvat	613	3.1	+3.1
Total formal votes		19,476	97.2	
Informal votes		557	2.8	
Turnout		20,033	94.1	
Two-party-preferred result
Labor	Frances Bedford	10,462	53.7	+0.9
Liberal	Lyn Petrie	9,014	46.3	−0.9
Labor hold		Swing	+0.9	

=== Frome ===
2002 South Australian state election: Frome
Party	Candidate	Votes	%	±%
Liberal	Rob Kerin	11,892	57.6	+12.1
Labor	John Rohde	7,261	35.2	−0.1
Democrats	Marcus Reseigh	863	4.2	−6.7
One Nation	Roger Hawkes	636	3.1	+3.1
Total formal votes		20,652	98.3	
Informal votes		366	1.7	
Turnout		21,018	95.3	
Two-party-preferred result
Liberal	Rob Kerin	12,692	61.5	+8.3
Labor	John Rohde	7,960	38.5	−8.3
Liberal hold		Swing	+8.3	

=== Giles ===
2002 South Australian state election: Giles
Party	Candidate	Votes	%	±%
Labor	Lyn Breuer	8,742	49.6	+1.5
Liberal	Jim Pollock	5,272	29.9	+0.4
Democrats	Clint Garrett	1,664	9.4	−7.3
Independent	John Smith	1,404	8.0	+8.0
One Nation	Valarie Nas	538	3.1	+3.1
Total formal votes		17,620	97.3	
Informal votes		489	2.7	
Turnout		18,109	87.1	
Two-party-preferred result
Labor	Lyn Breuer	10,527	59.7	−1.8
Liberal	Jim Pollock	7,093	40.3	+1.8
Labor hold		Swing	−1.8	

=== Goyder ===
2002 South Australian state election: Goyder
Party	Candidate	Votes	%	±%
Liberal	John Meier	10,446	51.3	−3.5
Labor	Ian Fitzgerald	4,740	23.3	+0.4
Independent	Stephen Redding	1,808	8.9	+8.9
Democrats	Richard Way	1,291	6.3	−7.7
Family First	Ian McDonald	925	4.5	+4.5
One Nation	Doug Holmes	690	3.4	+3.4
SA First	Alby Brand	480	2.4	+2.4
Total formal votes		20,380	96.9	
Informal votes		651	3.1	
Turnout		21,031	95.3	
Two-party-preferred result
Liberal	John Meier	13,501	66.2	−0.7
Labor	Ian Fitzgerald	6,879	33.8	+0.7
Liberal hold		Swing	−0.7	

=== Hammond ===
2002 South Australian state election: Hammond
Party	Candidate	Votes	%	±%
Liberal	Barry Featherston	8,072	41.2	−10.0
Independent	Peter Lewis	6,233	31.8	+31.8
Labor	Harold McLaren	3,368	17.2	−3.3
Democrats	Keith Webster	1,104	5.6	−12.3
One Nation	Judy Arnold	811	4.1	+4.1
Total formal votes		19,588	97.6	
Informal votes		482	2.4	
Turnout		20,070	94.6	
Notional two-party-preferred count
Liberal	Barry Featherston	12,958	66.2	+1.5
Labor	Harold McLaren	6,630	33.8	−1.5
Two-candidate-preferred result
Independent	Peter Lewis	10,205	52.1	+52.1
Liberal	Barry Featherston	9,383	47.9	−16.7
Independent gain from Liberal		Swing	N/A	

=== Hartley ===
2002 South Australian state election: Hartley
Party	Candidate	Votes	%	±%
Liberal	Joe Scalzi	8,779	43.6	+0.1
Labor	Quentin Black	7,852	39.0	+0.7
Democrats	Silard Regos	1,328	6.6	−11.5
Family First	Darko Pucek	918	4.6	+4.6
Greens	Joy O'Brien	845	4.2	+4.2
One Nation	Brian Richards	227	1.1	+1.1
Independent	Wendy McMahon	178	0.9	+0.9
Total formal votes		20,127	96.3	
Informal votes		765	3.7	
Turnout		20,892	92.9	
Two-party-preferred result
Liberal	Joe Scalzi	10,331	51.3	+0.7
Labor	Quentin Black	9,796	48.7	−0.7
Liberal hold		Swing	+0.7	

=== Heysen ===
2002 South Australian state election: Heysen
Party	Candidate	Votes	%	±%
Liberal	Isobel Redmond	9,222	46.0	−3.8
Labor	Jeremy Makin	3,662	18.3	−2.3
Democrats	Ted Dexter	3,266	16.3	−12.6
Greens	Dave Clark	1,760	8.8	+8.8
Independent	John Norris	736	3.7	+3.7
Family First	Sally McPherson	703	3.5	+3.5
SA First	Steve Hall	375	1.9	+1.9
One Nation	Lance Iles	276	1.4	+1.4
Independent	Howie Coombe	53	0.3	+0.3
Total formal votes		20,053	97.4	
Informal votes		536	2.6	
Turnout		20,589	94.1	
Notional two-party-preferred count
Liberal	Isobel Redmond	11,912	59.4	−2.5
Labor	Jeremy Makin	8,141	40.6	+2.5
Two-candidate-preferred result
Liberal	Isobel Redmond	10,825	54.0	+2.1
Democrats	Ted Dexter	9,228	46.0	−2.1
Liberal hold		Swing	+2.1	

=== Kaurna ===
2002 South Australian state election: Kaurna
Party	Candidate	Votes	%	±%
Labor	John Hill	8,742	45.2	+3.9
Liberal	Lauren Kenyon	5,245	27.1	−9.4
Independent	Lorraine Rosenberg	1,565	8.1	+8.1
Democrats	Beryl Hall	1,109	5.7	−7.2
Greens	Ali Valamanesh	1,053	5.4	+5.4
Family First	Colleen Pearse	787	4.1	+4.1
One Nation	Charlie McCormack	496	2.6	+2.6
SA First	James Chappell	359	1.9	+1.9
Total formal votes		19,356	96.4	
Informal votes		715	3.6	
Turnout		20,071	93.6	
Two-party-preferred result
Labor	John Hill	11,808	61.0	+6.0
Liberal	Lauren Kenyon	7,548	39.0	−6.0
Labor hold		Swing	+6.0	

=== Kavel ===
2002 South Australian state election: Kavel
Party	Candidate	Votes	%	±%
Liberal	Mark Goldsworthy	8,974	43.4	−9.1
Independent	Tom Playford	3,860	18.7	+18.7
Labor	Mel Hopgood	3,718	18.0	−1.4
Democrats	Cathi Tucker-Lee	1,874	9.1	−13.7
Greens	Felicity Martin	1,089	5.3	+5.3
SA First	Peter Robins	708	3.4	+3.4
One Nation	Basil Hille	459	2.2	+2.2
Total formal votes		20,682	96.9	
Informal votes		669	3.1	
Turnout		21,351	93.8	
Notional two-party-preferred count
Liberal	Mark Goldsworthy	13,051	63.1	−1.9
Labor	Mel Hopgood	7,631	36.9	+1.9
Two-candidate-preferred result
Liberal	Mark Goldsworthy	10,938	52.9	−3.8
Independent	Tom Playford	9,744	47.1	+47.1
Liberal hold		Swing	N/A	

=== Lee ===
2002 South Australian state election: Lee
Party	Candidate	Votes	%	±%
Labor	Michael Wright	9,131	45.8	−0.2
Liberal	Scott Cadzow	7,405	37.2	+5.0
Democrats	Trevor Tucker	1,104	5.5	−7.9
Greens	Pat Netschitowsky	1,062	5.3	+5.3
SA First	Cale Dalton	549	2.8	+2.8
One Nation	Lee Peacock	454	2.3	+2.3
Independent	Alan Griffiths	225	1.1	+1.1
Total formal votes		19,930	96.7	
Informal votes		682	3.3	
Turnout		20,612	93.4	
Two-party-preferred result
Labor	Michael Wright	11,361	57.0	−0.6
Liberal	Scott Cadzow	8,569	43.0	+0.6
Labor hold		Swing	−0.6	

=== Light ===
2002 South Australian state election: Light
Party	Candidate	Votes	%	±%
Liberal	Malcolm Buckby	8,954	43.6	+1.2
Labor	Annette Hurley	8,032	39.1	+3.2
Democrats	Tim Haines	1,121	5.5	−16.2
Family First	Shane Thorman	933	4.5	+4.5
One Nation	David Dwyer	627	3.1	+3.1
Greens	Ruth Jackson	587	2.9	+2.9
SA First	James Gallagher	285	1.4	+1.4
Total formal votes		20,539	96.6	
Informal votes		718	3.4	
Turnout		21,257	94.3	
Two-party-preferred result
Liberal	Malcolm Buckby	10,843	52.8	+1.9
Labor	Annette Hurley	9,696	47.2	−1.9
Liberal hold		Swing	+1.9	

=== MacKillop ===
2002 South Australian state election: MacKillop
Party	Candidate	Votes	%	±%
Liberal	Mitch Williams	10,809	52.1	+16.6
Independent	Bill Hender	3,470	16.7	+16.7
Labor	Philip Golding	2,798	13.5	−1.9
Independent	Bill Murray	1,727	8.3	+8.3
National	Darren O'Halloran	975	4.7	−3.8
One Nation	Arthur Tebbutt	559	2.7	+2.7
Democrats	Bob Netherton	409	2.0	−3.0
Total formal votes		20,747	97.5	
Informal votes		542	2.5	
Turnout		21,289	94.4	
Notional two-party-preferred count
Liberal	Mitch Williams	14,591	70.3	−0.6
Labor	Philip Golding	6,156	29.7	+0.6
Two-candidate-preferred result
Liberal	Mitch Williams	12,740	61.4	−9.5
Independent	Bill Hender	8,007	38.6	+38.6
Liberal hold		Swing	N/A	

=== Mawson ===
2002 South Australian state election: Mawson
Party	Candidate	Votes	%	±%
Liberal	Robert Brokenshire	9,206	43.7	−1.1
Labor	Moira Deslandes	7,739	36.8	+3.5
Democrats	Angela Nicholas	1,791	8.5	−11.0
Family First	Michael Last	1,391	6.6	+6.6
One Nation	Bert Justin	585	2.8	+2.8
Independent	Benny Zable	336	1.6	+1.6
Total formal votes		21,048	96.9	
Informal votes		669	3.1	
Turnout		21,717	94.6	
Two-party-preferred result
Liberal	Robert Brokenshire	11,270	53.5	−0.3
Labor	Moira Deslandes	9,778	46.5	+0.3
Liberal hold		Swing	−0.3	

=== Mitchell ===
2002 South Australian state election: Mitchell
Party	Candidate	Votes	%	±%
Labor	Kris Hanna	8,502	43.1	+5.4
Liberal	Hugh Martin	7,520	38.1	−2.1
Democrats	Bridgid Medder	1,595	8.1	−8.9
Family First	Wayne Bishop	922	4.7	+4.7
Independent	Deb Guildner	691	3.5	+3.5
One Nation	Daniel Piechnick	393	2.0	+2.0
Independent	Josephine Dowsett	122	0.6	+0.6
Total formal votes		19,745	96.6	
Informal votes		692	3.4	
Turnout		20,437	94.3	
Two-party-preferred result
Labor	Kris Hanna	10,794	54.7	+4.1
Liberal	Hugh Martin	8,951	45.3	−4.1
Labor hold		Swing	+4.1	

=== Morialta ===
2002 South Australian state election: Morialta
Party	Candidate	Votes	%	±%
Liberal	Joan Hall	8,733	43.8	−0.5
Labor	Cenz Lancione	6,931	34.8	+3.6
Democrats	Tim Farrow	2,083	10.4	−6.9
Family First	Jack Button	1,054	5.3	+5.3
SA First	Aphiah Salerno	579	2.9	+2.9
One Nation	Rosemary Hemsley	283	1.4	+1.4
Independent	Bruce Preece	272	1.4	+1.4
Total formal votes		19,935	95.5	
Informal votes		930	4.5	
Turnout		20,865	94.1	
Two-party-preferred result
Liberal	Joan Hall	10,791	54.1	−2.4
Labor	Cenz Lancione	9,144	45.9	+2.4
Liberal hold		Swing	−2.4	

=== Morphett ===
2002 South Australian state election: Morphett
Party	Candidate	Votes	%	±%
Liberal	Duncan McFetridge	11,731	54.6	+1.2
Labor	Rosemary Clancy	6,659	31.0	+3.0
Democrats	Ben Howieson	1,544	7.2	−10.9
Greens	Adam MacLeod	1,119	5.2	+5.2
One Nation	Peter Fitzpatrick	414	1.9	+1.9
Total formal votes		21,467	98.0	
Informal votes		447	2.0	
Turnout		21,914	93.5	
Two-party-preferred result
Liberal	Duncan McFetridge	12,889	60.0	−1.9
Labor	Rosemary Clancy	8,578	40.0	+1.9
Liberal hold		Swing	−1.9	

=== Mount Gambier ===
2002 South Australian state election: Mount Gambier
Party	Candidate	Votes	%	±%
Independent	Rory McEwen	12,246	58.4	+35.9
Liberal	Roger Saunders	4,261	20.3	−21.2
Labor	Jim Maher	3,621	17.3	−4.3
Democrats	Ron Purvis	460	2.2	−9.6
One Nation	Mike Thomas	397	1.9	+1.9
Total formal votes		20,985	97.3	
Informal votes		581	2.7	
Turnout		21,566	94.4	
Notional two-party-preferred count
Liberal	Roger Saunders	10,941	52.1	
Labor	Jim Maher	10,044	47.9	
Two-candidate-preferred result
Independent	Rory McEwen	16,065	76.6	+26.5
Liberal	Roger Saunders	4,920	23.4	−26.5
Independent hold		Swing	+26.5	

=== Napier ===
2002 South Australian state election: Napier
Party	Candidate	Votes	%	±%
Labor	Michael O'Brien	10,328	51.9	−3.2
Liberal	Joe Federico	5,623	28.3	+5.9
Democrats	Simon Pointer	1,710	8.6	−13.8
SA First	Tanya Adam	1,300	6.5	+6.5
One Nation	Michael Pointer	933	4.7	+4.7
Total formal votes		19,894	96.4	
Informal votes		741	3.6	
Turnout		20,635	93.4	
Two-party-preferred result
Labor	Michael O'Brien	12,786	64.3	+4.8
Liberal	Joe Federico	7,108	35.7	+35.7
Labor hold		Swing	N/A	

=== Newland ===
2002 South Australian state election: Newland
Party	Candidate	Votes	%	±%
Liberal	Dorothy Kotz	8,858	45.3	−1.3
Labor	Bernie Keane	6,842	35.0	+3.7
Democrats	Ruth Russell	2,020	10.3	−10.5
Family First	Steven Bakker	1,348	6.9	+6.9
One Nation	Hans Nas	474	2.4	+2.4
Total formal votes		19,542	97.6	
Informal votes		473	2.4	
Turnout		20,015	94.7	
Two-party-preferred result
Liberal	Dorothy Kotz	10,878	55.7	−1.3
Labor	Bernie Keane	8,664	44.3	+1.3
Liberal hold		Swing	−1.3	

=== Norwood ===
2002 South Australian state election: Norwood
Party	Candidate	Votes	%	±%
Liberal	Michael Durrant	8,633	41.9	+0.4
Labor	Vini Ciccarello	7,986	38.8	−0.9
Democrats	Adele Eliseo	1,654	8.0	−4.9
Greens	Mark Cullen	1,244	6.0	+2.1
Family First	Geraldine Bennett	575	2.8	+2.8
SA First	Darryl Tuppen	283	1.4	+1.4
One Nation	Thorpe Chambers	220	1.1	+1.1
Total formal votes		20,595	97.0	
Informal votes		639	3.0	
Turnout		21,234	92.0	
Two-party-preferred result
Labor	Vini Ciccarello	10,392	50.5	−1.0
Liberal	Michael Durrant	10,203	49.5	+1.0
Labor hold		Swing	−1.0	

=== Playford ===
2002 South Australian state election: Playford
Party	Candidate	Votes	%	±%
Labor	Jack Snelling	10,464	51.7	+2.4
Liberal	Tom Javor	5,859	28.9	+1.1
Democrats	Andrew Sickerdick	1,714	8.5	−9.6
Family First	Eileen Strikwerda	1,116	5.5	+5.5
One Nation	Bert Joy	632	3.1	+3.1
SA First	Jan Vrtielka	469	2.3	+2.3
Total formal votes		20,254	96.3	
Informal votes		774	3.7	
Turnout		21,028	94.1	
Two-party-preferred result
Labor	Jack Snelling	12,778	63.1	−0.4
Liberal	Tom Javor	7,476	36.9	+0.4
Labor hold		Swing	−0.4	

=== Port Adelaide ===
2002 South Australian state election: Port Adelaide
Party	Candidate	Votes	%	±%
Labor	Kevin Foley	11,796	58.4	−4.5
Liberal	Robert Crew	4,571	22.6	+1.7
Democrats	Meryl McDougall	1,239	6.1	−9.1
SA First	Joe Carbone	1,171	5.8	+5.8
Greens	Andrew Nance	843	4.2	+4.2
One Nation	Jan Amos	564	2.8	+2.8
Total formal votes		20,184	96.5	
Informal votes		730	3.5	
Turnout		20,914	93.7	
Two-party-preferred result
Labor	Kevin Foley	14,466	71.7	−1.1
Liberal	Robert Crew	5,718	28.3	+1.1
Labor hold		Swing	−1.1	

=== Ramsay ===
2002 South Australian state election: Ramsay
Party	Candidate	Votes	%	±%
Labor	Mike Rann	12,583	61.6	+6.2
Liberal	Phil Newton	4,785	23.4	+0.7
Democrats	Penelope Robertson	1,433	7.0	−9.0
SA First	Ona Trelbby	908	4.4	+4.4
One Nation	Dennis Murphy	715	3.5	+3.5
Total formal votes		20,424	96.6	
Informal votes		729	3.4	
Turnout		21,153	93.3	
Two-party-preferred result
Labor	Mike Rann	14,343	70.2	+1.2
Liberal	Phil Newton	6,081	29.8	−1.2
Labor hold		Swing	+1.2	

=== Reynell ===
2002 South Australian state election: Reynell
Party	Candidate	Votes	%	±%
Labor	Gay Thompson	8,489	43.3	+7.3
Liberal	Julie Greig	6,405	32.7	−5.7
Family First	Kevin Cramp	1,325	6.8	+6.8
Democrats	Graham Pratt	1,312	6.7	−12.2
Greens	Scott Ferguson	829	4.2	+4.2
SA First	Jenny Hefford	696	3.6	+3.6
One Nation	Glen Kelly	527	2.7	+2.7
Total formal votes		19,583	96.4	
Informal votes		739	3.6	
Turnout		20,322	94.1	
Two-party-preferred result
Labor	Gay Thompson	11,078	56.6	+4.8
Liberal	Julie Greig	8,505	43.4	−4.8
Labor hold		Swing	+4.8	

=== Schubert ===
2002 South Australian state election: Schubert
Party	Candidate	Votes	%	±%
Liberal	Ivan Venning	9,668	49.8	−3.0
Labor	Kym Wilson	4,360	22.5	+3.0
Democrats	Kate Reynolds	1,719	8.9	−12.8
National	David Lykke	963	5.0	+5.0
Greens	Pam Kelly	864	4.5	+4.5
SA First	Megan Moody	739	3.8	+3.8
One Nation	Hedley Scholz	725	3.7	+3.7
Independent	Russell Iles	366	1.9	+1.9
Total formal votes		19,404	96.7	
Informal votes		661	3.3	
Turnout		20,065	95.3	
Two-party-preferred result
Liberal	Ivan Venning	12,242	63.1	+4.4
Labor	Kym Wilson	7,162	36.9	+36.9
Liberal hold		Swing	N/A	

=== Stuart ===
2002 South Australian state election: Stuart
Party	Candidate	Votes	%	±%
Liberal	Graham Gunn	9,072	46.1	+1.2
Labor	Justin Jarvis	7,945	40.3	+4.0
One Nation	Sandra Wauchope	1,461	7.4	+7.4
Democrats	Bruce Lennon	764	3.9	−8.4
Independent	David Moore	452	2.3	+2.3
Total formal votes		19,694	97.7	
Informal votes		469	2.3	
Turnout		20,163	93.9	
Two-party-preferred result
Liberal	Graham Gunn	10,099	51.3	−1.4
Labor	Justin Jarvis	9,595	48.7	+1.4
Liberal hold		Swing	−1.4	

=== Taylor ===
2002 South Australian state election: Taylor
Party	Candidate	Votes	%	±%
Labor	Trish White	11,557	58.9	+4.1
Liberal	Anne Heinrich	5,076	25.9	+1.0
Democrats	Shirley Humphrey	1,403	7.1	−10.0
SA First	Hazel Dermody	860	4.4	+4.4
One Nation	John Mahoney	732	3.7	+3.7
Total formal votes		19,628	96.8	
Informal votes		647	3.2	
Turnout		20,275	93.4	
Two-party-preferred result
Labor	Trish White	13,283	67.7	−0.3
Liberal	Anne Heinrich	6,345	32.3	+0.3
Labor hold		Swing	−0.3	

=== Torrens ===
2002 South Australian state election: Torrens
Party	Candidate	Votes	%	±%
Labor	Robyn Geraghty	9,840	47.1	−0.9
Liberal	Damian Wyld	7,063	33.8	+1.7
Democrats	Tony Hill	1,824	8.7	−7.4
Family First	Carolyn Halfpenny	1,245	6.0	+6.0
SA First	Harry Krieg	518	2.5	+2.5
One Nation	Malcolm Hilliard	422	2.0	+2.0
Total formal votes		20,912	96.6	
Informal votes		733	3.4	
Turnout		21,645	93.9	
Two-party-preferred result
Labor	Robyn Geraghty	11,968	57.2	−3.1
Liberal	Damian Wyld	8,944	42.8	+3.1
Labor hold		Swing	−3.1	

=== Unley ===
2002 South Australian state election: Unley
Party	Candidate	Votes	%	±%
Liberal	Mark Brindal	10,598	52.4	+5.0
Labor	Vicki Jacobs	6,152	30.4	+6.0
Democrats	Ingrid Vogelzang	1,447	7.2	−8.1
Greens	Peter Fiebig	1,236	6.1	+6.1
SA First	Franca Zosens	622	3.1	+3.1
One Nation	Clarke Staker	165	0.8	+0.8
Total formal votes		20,220	98.0	
Informal votes		419	2.0	
Turnout		20,639	91.5	
Two-party-preferred result
Liberal	Mark Brindal	11,924	59.0	−0.6
Labor	Vicki Jacobs	8,296	41.0	+0.6
Liberal hold		Swing	−0.6	

=== Waite ===
2002 South Australian state election: Waite
Party	Candidate	Votes	%	±%
Liberal	Martin Hamilton-Smith	11,018	53.0	+2.2
Labor	Mark Hancock	5,007	24.1	+0.5
Democrats	Stephen Spence	2,552	12.3	−11.2
Greens	Michael Pritchard	1,109	5.3	+5.3
Family First	Thea Hennessey	624	3.0	+3.0
SA First	Chris Alford	273	1.3	+1.3
One Nation	Hazel Nicholls	221	1.1	+1.1
Total formal votes		20,804	97.5	
Informal votes		540	2.5	
Turnout		21,344	93.1	
Two-party-preferred result
Liberal	Martin Hamilton-Smith	12,897	62.0	+7.2
Labor	Mark Hancock	7,907	38.0	+38.0
Liberal hold		Swing	N/A	

=== West Torrens ===
2002 South Australian state election: West Torrens
Party	Candidate	Votes	%	±%
Labor	Tom Koutsantonis	9,452	45.8	+6.6
Liberal	Theo Vlassis	7,307	35.4	−0.5
Democrats	Nicole Lomman	1,353	6.6	−7.0
Greens	Deb Cashel	1,284	6.2	+6.2
Family First	Lawrence Chattaway	568	2.8	+2.8
SA First	Alex Filipovic	375	1.8	+1.8
One Nation	Jean Holmes	300	1.5	+1.5
Total formal votes		20,639	96.6	
Informal votes		721	3.4	
Turnout		21,360	93.1	
Two-party-preferred result
Labor	Tom Koutsantonis	12,090	58.6	+4.1
Liberal	Theo Vlassis	8,549	41.4	−4.1
Labor hold		Swing	+4.1	

=== Wright ===
2002 South Australian state election: Wright
Party	Candidate	Votes	%	±%
Labor	Jennifer Rankine	9,676	45.0	+1.9
Liberal	Mark Osterstock	8,243	38.3	+2.4
Democrats	Helen Munro	1,567	7.3	−6.7
Family First	Lyn Griffin	1,541	7.2	+7.2
One Nation	Rod Kowald	487	2.3	+2.3
Total formal votes		21,514	97.8	
Informal votes		494	2.2	
Turnout		22,008	94.6	
Two-party-preferred result
Labor	Jennifer Rankine	11,438	53.2	−1.2
Liberal	Mark Osterstock	10,076	46.8	+1.2
Labor hold		Swing	−1.2	

== See also ==
- Candidates of the 2002 South Australian state election
- Members of the South Australian House of Assembly, 2002–2006
