= Candidates of the 2002 South Australian state election =

The 2002 South Australian state election was held on 9 February 2002.

== Retiring Members ==
=== Labor ===
- Carolyn Pickles MLC

=== Liberal ===
- Michael Armitage MHA (Adelaide)
- Steve Condous MHA (Colton)
- Graham Ingerson MHA (Bragg)
- John Olsen MHA (Kavel)
- John Oswald MHA (Morphett)
- David Wotton MHA (Heysen)
- Legh Davis MLC
- Trevor Griffin MLC
- Jamie Irwin MLC

== House of Assembly ==
Sitting members are shown in bold text. Successful candidates are highlighted in the relevant colour. Where there is possible confusion, an asterisk (*) is also used.

| Electorate | Held by | Labor candidate | Liberal candidate | Democrats candidate | One Nation candidate | Family First candidate | Other candidates |
|---|---|---|---|---|---|---|---|
| Adelaide | Liberal | Jane Lomax-Smith | Michael Harbison | Cherie Prosser | Roy Bedford | Andrea Mason | Albert Bensimon (NHHP); Tom Bertuleit (Ind); Jake Bugden (Grn); Ben Krieg (SAF) |
| Ashford | Labor | **Stephanie Key** | Peter Panagaris | Sue Mann | Jos Underhill | James Troup | Michelle Drummond (Grn); Paul Vanderkop (SAF) |
| Bragg | Liberal | Karen Atherton | Vickie Chapman | Julia Grant | Betty Bedford | Jamilah Lovibond | John Wood (SAF) |
| Bright | Liberal | Ron Baronian | **Wayne Matthew** | Fiona Blinco | Laurel Payne | Vasiliki Savvas | Cheryl Connor (Ind); Bob Darlington (Grn); Kathy Williams (SAF) |
| Chaffey | National | Waluwe Simpson-Lyttle | Kent Andrew | Graham McNaughton | Shirley Faulkner | | **Karlene Maywald** (Nat) |
| Cheltenham | Labor | Jay Weatherill | Sue Lawrie | Cheryl Glenie | Sarah Gibson | | Alex Alexander (SAF); Nugget Cooke (Ind); **Murray De Laine** (Ind); Anne McMenamin (Grn) |
| Colton | Liberal | Paul Caica | John Behenna | Caroline Dowd | Andrew Phillips | Andrew Lewis | Desi d'Orsay-Lawrence (SAF); Jim Douglas (Grn); Joe Ienco (Ind); Alison Patterson (Ind) |
| Croydon | Labor | **Michael Atkinson** | Angus Bristow | Daryl Owen | John Victorsen | | James England (SAF); Jessica Gosnell (Ind) |
| Davenport | Liberal | Gerry Bowen | **Iain Evans** | Yvonne Caddy | F. Vandenbroek | | Brenton Chappell (SAF); Ralph Hahnheuser (Ind); Moira Humphries (Ind) |
| Elder | Labor | **Patrick Conlon** | Heidi Harris | Greg Croke | Colin Roediger | Peter Heaven | Kate Cooper (Grn); Mnem Giles (Ind); Bob Stewart (SAF) |
| Elizabeth | Labor | **Lea Stevens** | Ron Watts | Anna Lukasiewicz | Robert Fechner | Peter Barnes | Duncan MacMillan (SAF) |
| Enfield | Labor | John Rau | Doster Mitchell | Alex Angas | Barbara Kirvan | Lorraine Evans | **Ralph Clarke** (Ind) |
| Finniss | Liberal | Graham Hockley | **Dean Brown** | John Lavers | Joy Rayner | Bill Megaritis | Matt Rigney (Grn) |
| Fisher | Liberal | Alex Zimmermann | Susan Jeanes | Jason Smith | Trevor Mullins | Kylie Borg | John Chudzicki (SAF); **Bob Such*** (Ind) |
| Flinders | Liberal | John Lovegrove | **Liz Penfold** | Sally Tonkin | Charles Kirvan | | Grantley Siviour (Nat) |
| Florey | Labor | **Frances Bedford** | Lyn Petrie | Paul Rowse | Victor Horvat | Rob Pillar | Lisa Blake (Grn) |
| Frome | Liberal | John Rohde | **Rob Kerin** | Marcus Reseigh | Roger Hawkes | | |
| Giles | Labor | **Lyn Breuer** | Jim Pollock | Clint Garrett | Valarie Nas | | John Smith (Ind) |
| Goyder | Liberal | Ian Fitzgerald | **John Meier** | Richard Way | Doug Holmes | Ian McDonald | Alby Brand (SAF); Stepen Redding (Ind) |
| Hammond | Liberal | Harold McLaren | Barry Featherston | Keith Webster | Judy Arnold | | **Peter Lewis** (CLIC) |
| Hartley | Liberal | Quentin Black | **Joe Scalzi** | Silard Regos | Brian Richards | Darko Pucek | Wendy McMahon (Ind); Joy O'Brien (Grn) |
| Heysen | Liberal | Jeremy Makin | Isobel Redmond | Ted Dexter | Lance Iles | Sally McPherson | Dave Clark (Grn); Howie Coombe (Ind); Steve Hall (SAF); John Norris (Ind) |
| Kaurna | Labor | **John Hill** | Lauren Kenyon | Beryl Hall | Charlie McCormack | Colleen Pearse | James Chappell (SAF); Lorraine Rosenberg (Ind); Ali Valamanesh (Grn) |
| Kavel | Liberal | Mel Hopgood | Mark Goldsworthy | Cathi Tucker-Lee | Basil Hille | | Felicity Martin (Grn); Tom Playford (Ind); Peter Robins (SAF) |
| Lee | Labor | **Michael Wright** | Scott Cadzow | Trevor Tucker | Lee Peacock | | Cale Dalton (SAF); Alan Griffiths (Ind); Pat Netschitowsky (Grn) |
| Light | Labor | **Annette Hurley** | **Malcolm Buckby** | Tim Haines | David Dwyer | Shane Thorman | James Gallagher (SAF); Ruth Jackson (Grn) |
| MacKillop | Independent | Philip Golding | **Mitch Williams** | Bob Netherton | Arthur Tebbutt | | Bill Hender (Ind); Bill Murray (Ind); Darren O'Halloran (Nat) |
| Mawson | Liberal | Moira Deslandes | **Robert Brokenshire** | Angela Nicholas | Bert Justin | Michael Last | Benny Zable (Ind) |
| Mitchell | Labor | **Kris Hanna** | Hugh Martin | Bridgid Medder | Daniel Piechnick | Wayne Bishop | Josephine Dowsett (Ind); Deb Guildner (Ind) |
| Morialta | Liberal | Cenz Lancione | **Joan Hall** | Tim Farrow | Rosemary Hemsley | Jack Button | Bruce Preece (CLIC); Aphiah Salerno (SAF) |
| Morphett | Liberal | Rosemary Clancy | Duncan McFetridge | Ben Howieson | Peter Fitzpatrick | | Adam MacLeod (Grn) |
| Mount Gambier | Independent | Jim Maher | Roger Saunders | Ron Purvis | Mike Thomas | | **Rory McEwen** (Ind) |
| Napier | Labor | Michael O'Brien | Joe Federico | Simon Pointer | Michael Pointer | | Tanya Adam (SAF) |
| Newland | Liberal | Bernie Keane | **Dorothy Kotz** | Ruth Russell | Hans Nas | Steven Bakker | |
| Norwood | Labor | **Vini Ciccarello** | Michael Durrant | Adele Eliseo | Thorpe Chambers | Geraldine Bennett | Mark Cullen (Grn); Darryl Tuppen (SAF) |
| Playford | Labor | **Jack Snelling** | Tom Javor | Andrew Sickerdick | Bert Joy | Eileen Strikwerda | Jan Vrtielka (SAF) |
| Port Adelaide | Labor | **Kevin Foley** | Robert Crew | Meryl McDougall | Jan Amos | | Joe Carbone (SAF); Andrew Nance (Grn) |
| Ramsay | Labor | **Mike Rann** | Phil Newton | Penelope Robertson | Dennis Murphy | | Ona Trelbby (SAF) |
| Reynell | Labor | **Gay Thompson** | Julie Greig | Graham Pratt | Glen Kelly | Kevin Cramp | Scott Ferguson (Grn); Jenny Hefford (SAF) |
| Schubert | Liberal | Kym Wilson | **Ivan Venning** | Kate Reynolds | Hedley Scholz | | Russell Iles (CLIC); Pam Kelly (Grn); David Lykke (Nat); Megan Moody (SAF) |
| Stuart | Liberal | Justin Jarvis | **Graham Gunn** | Bruce Lennon | Sandra Wauchope | | David Moore (CLIC) |
| Taylor | Labor | **Trish White** | Anne Heinrich | Shirley Humphrey | John Mahoney | | Hazel Dermody (SAF) |
| Torrens | Labor | **Robyn Geraghty** | Damian Wyld | Tony Hill | Malcolm Hilliard | Carolyn Halfpenny | Harry Krieg (SAF) |
| Unley | Liberal | Vicki Jacobs | **Mark Brindal** | Ingrid Vogelzang | Clarke Staker | | Peter Fiebig (Grn); Franca Zosens (SAF) |
| Waite | Liberal | Mark Hancock | **Martin Hamilton-Smith** | Stephen Spence | Hazel Nicholls | Thea Hennessey | Chris Alford (SAF); Michael Pritchard (Grn) |
| West Torrens | Labor | **Tom Koutsantonis** | Theo Vlassis | Nicole Lomman | Jean Holmes | Lawrence Chattaway | Deb Cashel (Grn); Alex Filipovic (SAF) |
| Wright | Labor | **Jennifer Rankine** | Mark Osterstock | Helen Munro | Rod Kowald | Lyn Griffin | |

== Legislative Council ==
Sitting members are shown in bold text. Tickets that elected at least one MLC are highlighted in the relevant colour. Successful candidates are identified by an asterisk (*). Eleven seats were up for election. Labor were defending four seats. The Liberals were defending six seats. The Democrats were defending one seat.

| Labor candidates | Liberal candidates | Democrats candidates | Family First candidates | Greens candidates | One Nation candidates |
|---|---|---|---|---|---|
| 1. Gail Gago*; 2. **Paul Holloway***; 3. **Terry Roberts***; 4. John Gazzola*; 5. Jeremy Moore | 1. **Robert Lawson***; 2. **Caroline Schaefer***; 3. **Angus Redford***; 4. David Ridgway*; 5. Terry Stephens*; 6. John Voumard; 7. Ann Bell | 1. **Sandra Kanck***; 2. Brian Haddy; 3. Peter Clements; 4. Matilda Bawden | 1. Andrew Evans*; 2. Paul Newsham; 3. Anne Bakker; 4. Toni Turnbull | 1. Brian Noone; 2. Cate Faehrmann; 3. Sarah Martin; 4. Craig Wilkins | 1. Neil Russell-Taylor; 2. Colin Gibson |
| Nationals SA candidates | No Pokies candidates | SA First candidates | Grey Power candidates | Euthanasia candidates | Alliance candidates |
| 1. Paul Brown; 2. Robin Dixon-Thompson | 1. Pat Dean; 2. Chelsea Lewis | 1. Ron Williams; 2. Dannielle Little | 1. Sophia Provatidis; 2. Una Pawson | 1. Philip Nitschke; 2. Doug McLaren | 1. Mark Aldridge; 2. Kym Fishlock |
| Nuclear Free candidates | Single tickets | | | | |
| 1. Cherie Hoyle; 2. Ben Aylen; 3. Matthew Young | Andrew Cole (RPA); Jennifer Holmes; Michael Wohltmann; Max Tatnell; K. Johnston; Glen Gordon; Edith Pringle | Jenni Dobrowolski; Anna Eleftheriadis; Marlene McArthur; Jamnee Danenberg (HEMP); Angel Marinoni; Stormy Summers; Tanya Flesfader | Mike Dzamko; John Bannon; Kym Hall; Brett McHolme; **Trevor Crothers**; Sandra Russo; Richard Lutz | Andrew Stanko; Michael Keenan; Peter Aslandis; Paul Della; Neill Simpson; Leonard Spencer; John Toro | Dean Le Poidevin; Tauto Sansbury; Rita Hunt (NGST); Anna Likouresis; John Ternezis; Dennis Robinson; Barry Oxer |
