= 50th Parliament of South Australia =

2002–2006 meeting of the South Australian Parliament

Fiftieth Parliament of South Australia
| ← | 49th | 51st | → |
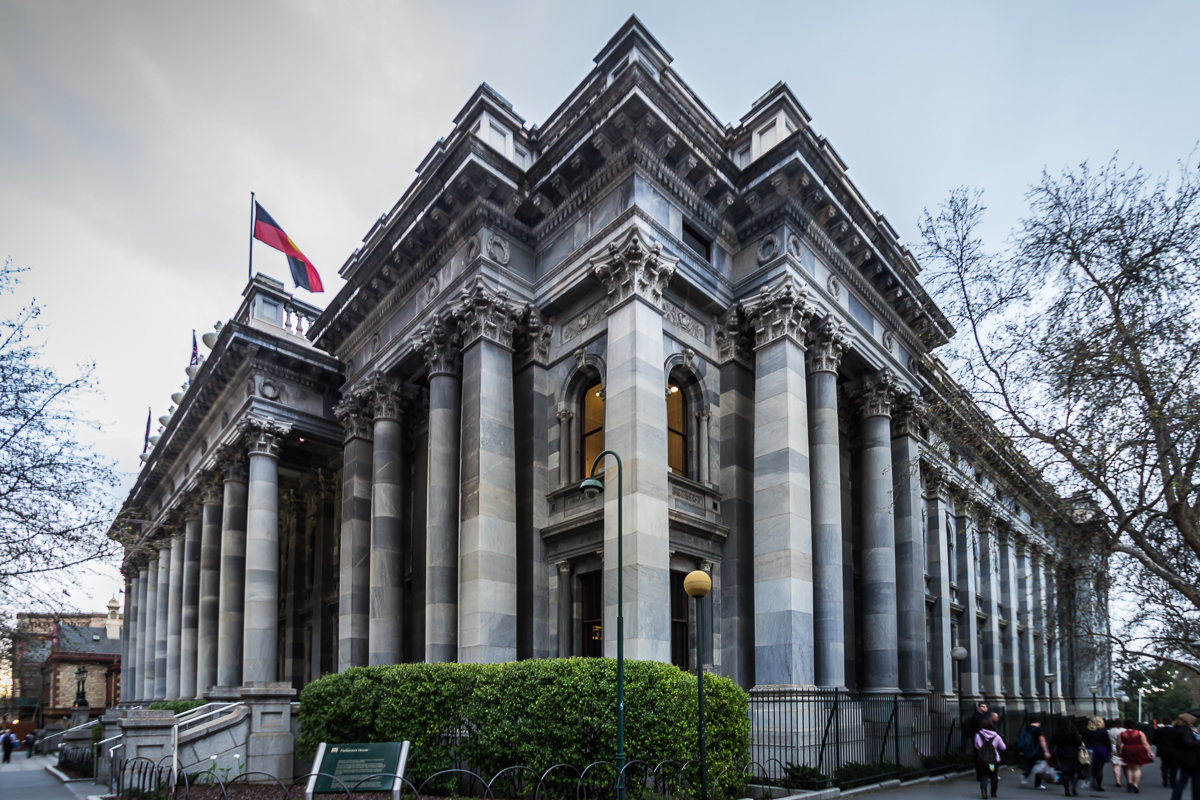

Overview
- Legislative body: Parliament of South Australia
- Meeting place: Parliament House
- Term: 5 March 2002 – 20 February 2006
- Election: 9 February 2002
- Government: Labor (minority)
- Opposition: Liberal

Legislative Council
- Members: Government (7): Labor (7); Opposition (9): Liberal (9); Crossbench (6): Democrats (3); Family First (1); Independent (1) (Note: Terry Cameron.); No Pokies (1)
- President: Ron Roberts, Labor
- Leader of the Government: Paul Holloway
- Party control: Liberal (minority)

House of Assembly
- Members: Government (22): Labor (22); Opposition (20): Liberal (20); Crossbench (5): Independent (4) (Note: Kris Hanna, Peter Lewis, Rory McEwen, and Bob Such.); National (1)
- Speaker: Peter Lewis, Independent (until 4 April 2005); Bob Such, Independent (from 4 April 2005)
- Government Whip: Robyn Geraghty
- Opposition Whip: John Meier
- Party control: Labor (minority)

Sessions
- 1st: 5 March 2002 – 5 March 2002
- 2nd: 7 May 2002 – 31 July 2003
- 3rd: 15 September 2003 – 12 August 2004
- 4th: 14 September 2004 – 8 December 2005

The 50th Parliament of South Australia was a meeting of the legislative branch of the South Australian state government, composed of the South Australian Legislative Council and the South Australian House of Assembly.

== Leadership ==
=== Legislative Council ===
Presiding officer

- President of the Legislative Council: Ron Roberts
- Clerk of the Legislative Council: Janice Davis
- Deputy Clerk and Usher of the Black Rod: Trevor Blowes

Government leadership

- Leader of the Government: Paul Holloway

=== House of Assembly ===
Presiding officer

- Speaker of the House of Assembly: Peter Lewis (until 4 April 2005), Bob Such (from 4 April 2005)
- Chairman of Committees: Bob Such (until 4 April 2005), Jack Snelling (from 4 April 2005)
- Clerk of the Legislative Council: Geoffrey Mitchell (until 11 July 2002), David Bridges (from 18 February 2002)
- Deputy Clerk and Sergeant-at-arms: David Bridges (until 18 February 2002), Paul Collett (from 18 February 2002 until 17 June 2002), Malcolm Lehman (from 17 June 2002)

Government leadership

- Premier: Mike Rann
- Deputy Premier: Kevin Foley
- Government Whip: Robyn Geraghty

Opposition leadership

- Leader of the Opposition: Rob Kerin
- Deputy Leader of the Opposition: Dean Brown (until 21 November 2005), Iain Evans (from 21 November 2005)
- Opposition Whip: John Meier

== Party summary ==
=== Legislative Council ===
Council membership (at dissolution) 7 Labor Liberal 9 Family First 1 1 Independent 1 No Pokies 3 Democrats

| Affiliation | Party (shading shows control) | | | | | | | Total | Vacant |
| Affiliation | ALP | IND | SAF | NOP | DEM | LIB | FFP | Total | Vacant |
|---|---|---|---|---|---|---|---|---|---|
| End of previous Parliament | 6 | 1 | 1 | 1 | 3 | 10 | – | 22 | 0 |
| Begin (5 March 2002) | 7 | – | 1 | 1 | 3 | 9 | 1 | 22 | 0 |
| 10 December 2002 | 7 | – | 1 | 1 | 2 | 9 | 1 | 21 | 1 |
| 31 December 2002 | 7 | 1 | – | 1 | 2 | 9 | 1 | 21 | 1 |
| 17 February 2003 | 7 | 1 | – | 1 | 3 | 9 | 1 | 22 | 0 |
| 6 June 2003 | 7 | 1 | – | 1 | 3 | 8 | 1 | 21 | 1 |
| 26 June 2003 | 7 | 1 | – | 1 | 3 | 9 | 1 | 22 | 0 |
| 18 February 2006 | 6 | 1 | – | 1 | 3 | 9 | 1 | 21 | 1 |
| Latest voting share % | 28.57 | 4.76 | 0.00 | 4.76 | 14.29 | 42.86 | 4.76 | | |

=== House of Assembly ===
House membership (at dissolution) 22 Labor Liberal 20 National 1 4 Independent

| Affiliation | Party (shading shows control) | | | | | Total | Vacant |
| Affiliation | GRN | ALP | IND | LIB | NAT | Total | Vacant |
|---|---|---|---|---|---|---|---|
| End of previous Parliament | – | 19 | 5 | 22 | 1 | 47 | 0 |
| Begin (5 March 2002) | – | 23 | 3 | 20 | 1 | 47 | 0 |
| 30 January 2003 | 1 | 22 | 3 | 20 | 1 | 47 | 0 |
| 8 February 2006 | – | 22 | 4 | 20 | 1 | 47 | 0 |
| Latest voting share % | 0.00 | 46.81 | 8.51 | 42.55 | 2.13 | | |

== Membership ==
=== Legislative Council ===
11 of the 22 seats in the upper house were contested in the election on 9 February 2002. Members elected in 2002 are marked with an asterisk (*).

▌ Terry Cameron
▌ John Dawkins
▌ Andrew Evans*
▌ Gail Gago*
▌ John Gazzola*
▌ Ian Gilfillan
▌ Paul Holloway*
▌ Sandra Kanck*
▌ Robert Lawson*
▌ Michelle Lensink
▌ Rob Lucas

▌ Angus Redford*
▌ Kate Reynolds
▌ David Ridgway*
▌ Ron Roberts
▌ Terry Roberts*
▌ Caroline Schaefer*
▌ Bob Sneath
▌ Julian Stefani
▌ Terry Stephens*
▌ Nick Xenophon
▌ Carmel Zollo

=== House of Assembly ===
All 47 seats in the lower house were contested in the election on 9 February 2002.

▌ Michael Atkinson (Croydon)
▌ Frances Bedford (Florey)
▌ Lyn Breuer (Giles)
▌ Mark Brindal (Unley)
▌ Robert Brokenshire (Mawson)
▌ Dean Brown (Finniss)
▌ Malcolm Buckby (Light)
▌ Paul Caica (Colton)
▌ Vickie Chapman (Bragg)
▌ Vini Ciccarello (Norwood)
▌ Patrick Conlon (Elder)
▌ Iain Evans (Davenport)
▌ Kevin Foley (Port Adelaide)
▌ Robyn Geraghty (Torrens)
▌ Mark Goldsworthy (Kavel)
▌ Graham Gunn (Stuart)

▌ Joan Hall (Morialta)
▌ Martin Hamilton-Smith (Waite)
▌ Kris Hanna (Mitchell)
▌ John Hill (Kaurna)
▌ Rob Kerin (Frome)
▌ Stephanie Key (Ashford)
▌ Dorothy Kotz (Newland)
▌ Tom Koutsantonis (West Torrens)
▌ Peter Lewis (Hammond)
▌ Jane Lomax-Smith (Adelaide)
▌ Wayne Matthew (Bright)
▌ Karlene Maywald (Chaffey)
▌ Rory McEwen (Mount Gambier)
▌ Duncan McFetridge (Morphett)
▌ John Meier (Goyder)
▌ Michael O'Brien (Napier)

▌ Liz Penfold (Flinders)
▌ Jennifer Rankine (Wright)
▌ Mike Rann (Ramsay)
▌ John Rau (Enfield)
▌ Isobel Redmond (Heysen)
▌ Joe Scalzi (Hartley)
▌ Jack Snelling (Playford)
▌ Lea Stevens (Elizabeth)
▌ Bob Such (Fisher)
▌ Gay Thompson (Reynell)
▌ Ivan Venning (Schubert)
▌ Jay Weatherill (Cheltenham)
▌ Trish White (Taylor)
▌ Mitch Williams (MacKillop)
▌ Michael Wright (Lee)

== Changes of membership ==
=== Legislative Council ===
| Before | | Change | | After | | |
| Member | Party | Type | Date | Date | Member | Party |
|---|---|---|---|---|---|---|
| Mike Elliott | Democrats | Resigned | 10 December 2002 | 17 February 2003 | Kate Reynolds | Democrats |
| Terry Cameron | SA First | Party disbanded | 31 December 2002 | | Terry Cameron | Independent |
| Diana Laidlaw | Liberal | Resigned | 6 June 2003 | 26 June 2003 | Michelle Lensink | Liberal |
| Terry Roberts | Labor | Died | 18 February 2006 | 2 May 2006 | Vacant | Labor |

=== House of Assembly ===
| Seat | Before | | Change | | After | | |
| Seat | Member | Party | Type | Date | Date | Member | Party |
|---|---|---|---|---|---|---|---|
| Mitchell | Kris Hanna | Labor | Resigned from party | 30 January 2003 | | Kris Hanna | Greens |
| Mitchell | Kris Hanna | Greens | Resigned from party | 8 February 2006 | | Kris Hanna | Independent |

== See also ==
- Members of the South Australian Legislative Council, 2002–2006
- Members of the South Australian House of Assembly, 2002–2006
