= 49th Parliament of South Australia =

1997–2002 meeting of the South Australian Parliament

Forty-ninth Parliament of South Australia
←	48th	50th	→
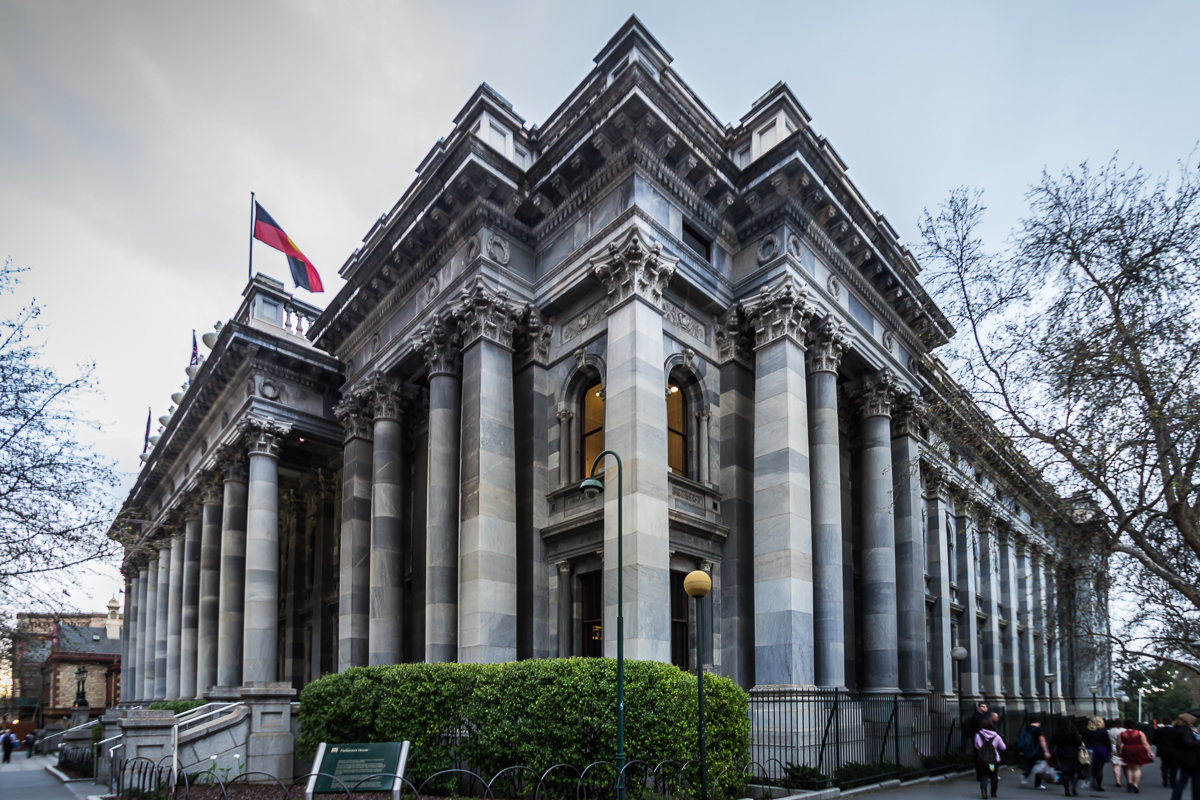

Overview
- Legislative body: Parliament of South Australia
- Meeting place: Parliament House
- Term: 2 December 1997 – 15 January 2002
- Election: 11 October 1997
- Government: Liberal (minority)
- Opposition: Labor

Legislative Council
- Members: Government (10): Liberal (10); Opposition (6): Labor (6); Crossbench (6): SA First (1); No Pokies (1); Democrats (1); Independent (1) (Note: Trevor Crothers.)
- President: Jamie Irwin, Liberal
- Leader of the Government: Rob Lucas
- Party control: Liberal (minority)

House of Assembly
- Members: Government (22): Liberal (22); Opposition (19): Labor (19); Crossbench (5): Independent (5) (Note: Ralph Clarke, Murray De Laine, Peter Lewis, Rory McEwen, and Bob Such.); National (1)
- Speaker: John Oswald, Liberal
- Government Whip: John Meier
- Opposition Whip: Murray De Laine (until 15 August 2001); Robyn Geraghty (from 15 August 2001)
- Party control: Liberal (minority)

Sessions
- 1st: 2 December 1997 – 17 September 1998
- 2nd: 27 October 1998 – 26 August 1999
- 3rd: 28 September 1999 – 10 August 2000
- 4th: 4 October 2000 – 15 January 2002

The 49th Parliament of South Australia was a meeting of the legislative branch of the South Australian state government, composed of the South Australian Legislative Council and the South Australian House of Assembly.

== Leadership ==
=== Legislative Council ===
Presiding officer

- President of the Legislative Council: Jamie Irwin
- Clerk of the Legislative Council: Janice Davis
- Deputy Clerk and Usher of the Black Rod: Trevor Blowes

Government leadership

- Leader of the Government: Rob Lucas

=== House of Assembly ===
Presiding officer

- Speaker of the House of Assembly: John Oswald
- Chairman of Committees: David Wotton
- Clerk of the Legislative Council: Geoffrey Mitchell
- Deputy Clerk and Sergeant-at-arms: David Bridges

Government leadership

- Premier: John Olsen (until 22 October 2001), Rob Kerin (from 22 October 2001)
- Deputy Premier: Rob Kerin (until 22 October 2001), Dean Brown (from 22 October 2001)
- Government Whip: John Meier

Opposition leadership

- Leader of the Opposition: Mike Rann
- Deputy Leader of the Opposition: Annette Hurley
- Opposition Whip: Murray De Laine (until 15 August 2001), Robyn Geraghty (from 15 August 2001)

== Party summary ==
=== Legislative Council ===
Council membership (at dissolution) 6 Labor Liberal 10 1 Independent 1 SA First 1 No Pokies 3 Democrats

Affiliation	Party (shading shows control)						Total	Vacant
Affiliation	ALP	IND	SAF	NOP	DEM	LIB	Total	Vacant
End of previous Parliament	9	–	–	–	2	11	22	0
Start (2 December 1997)	8	–	–	1	3	10	22	0
25 July 1998	7	1	–	1	3	10	22	0
25 March 1999	7	–	1	1	3	10	22	0
3 June 1999	6	1	1	1	3	10	22	0
1 September 2000	5	1	1	1	3	10	21	1
4 October 2000	6	1	1	1	3	10	22	0
Latest voting share %	27.27	4.55	4.55	4.55	13.64	45.45		

=== House of Assembly ===
House membership (at dissolution) 19 Labor National 1 Liberal 22 5 Independent

Affiliation	Party (shading shows control)				Total	Vacant
Affiliation	ALP	IND	LIB	NAT	Total	Vacant
End of previous Parliament	11	–	36	–	47	0
Start (2 December 1997)	21	2	23	1	47	0
6 December 1999	21	1	24	1	47	0
6 July 2000	21	2	23	1	47	0
12 October 2000	21	3	22	1	47	0
15 August 2001	20	4	22	1	47	0
27 November 2001	19	5	22	1	47	0
Latest voting share %	40.43	10.64	46.81	2.13		

== Membership ==
=== Legislative Council ===
11 of the 22 seats in the upper house were contested in the election on 11 October 1997. Members elected in 1997 are marked with an asterisk (*).

▌ Terry Cameron*
▌ Trevor Crothers
▌ Legh Davis
▌ John Dawkins*
▌ Mike Elliott*
▌ Ian Gilfillan*
▌ Trevor Griffin
▌ Paul Holloway
▌ Jamie Irwin
▌ Sandra Kanck
▌ Diana Laidlaw*

▌ Robert Lawson
▌ Rob Lucas*
▌ Carolyn Pickles
▌ Angus Redford
▌ Ron Roberts*
▌ Terry Roberts
▌ Caroline Schaefer
▌ Bob Sneath*
▌ Julian Stefani*
▌ Nick Xenophon*
▌ Carmel Zollo*

=== House of Assembly ===
All 47 seats in the lower house were contested in the election on 11 October 1997.

▌ Michael Armitage (Adelaide)
▌ Michael Atkinson (Spence)
▌ Frances Bedford (Florey)
▌ Lyn Breuer (Giles)
▌ Mark Brindal (Unley)
▌ Robert Brokenshire (Mawson)
▌ Dean Brown (Finniss)
▌ Malcolm Buckby (Light)
▌ Vini Ciccarello (Norwood)
▌ Ralph Clarke (Ross Smith)
▌ Steve Condous (Colton)
▌ Patrick Conlon (Elder)
▌ Murray De Laine (Price)
▌ Iain Evans (Davenport)
▌ Kevin Foley (Hart)
▌ Robyn Geraghty (Torrens)

▌ Graham Gunn (Stuart)
▌ Joan Hall (Coles)
▌ Martin Hamilton-Smith (Waite)
▌ Kris Hanna (Mitchell)
▌ John Hill (Kaurna)
▌ Annette Hurley (Napier)
▌ Graham Ingerson (Bragg)
▌ Rob Kerin (Frome)
▌ Stephanie Key (Hanson)
▌ Dorothy Kotz (Newland)
▌ Tom Koutsantonis (Peake)
▌ Peter Lewis (Hammond)
▌ Wayne Matthew (Bright)
▌ Karlene Maywald (Chaffey)
▌ Rory McEwen (Gordon)
▌ John Meier (Goyder)

▌ John Olsen (Kavel)
▌ John Oswald (Morphett)
▌ Liz Penfold (Flinders)
▌ Jennifer Rankine (Wright)
▌ Mike Rann (Ramsay)
▌ Joe Scalzi (Hartley)
▌ Jack Snelling (Playford)
▌ Lea Stevens (Elizabeth)
▌ Bob Such (Fisher)
▌ Gay Thompson (Reynell)
▌ Ivan Venning (Schubert)
▌ Trish White (Taylor)
▌ Mitch Williams (MacKillop)
▌ David Wotton (Heysen)
▌ Michael Wright (Lee)

== Changes in membership ==
=== Legislative Council ===
Before		Change		After		
Member	Party	Type	Date	Date	Member	Party
Terry Cameron	Labor	Resigned from party	25 July 1998		Terry Cameron	Independent
Terry Cameron	Independent	New party	25 March 1999		Terry Cameron	SA First
Trevor Crothers	Labor	Resigned from party	3 June 1999		Trevor Crothers	Independent
George Weatherill	Labor	Resigned	1 September 2000	4 October 2000	Bob Sneath	Labor

=== House of Assembly ===
Seat	Before		Change		After		
Seat	Member	Party	Type	Date	Date	Member	Party
MacKillop	Mitch Williams	Independent	Joined party	6 December 1999		Mitch Williams	Liberal
Hammond	Peter Lewis	Liberal	Expelled from party	6 July 2000		Peter Lewis	Independent
Fisher	Bob Such	Liberal	Resigned from party	12 October 2000		Bob Such	Independent
Price	Murray De Laine	Labor	Resigned from party	15 August 2001		Murray De Laine	Independent
Ross Smith	Ralph Clarke	Labor	Resigned from party	27 November 2001		Ralph Clarke	Independent

== See also ==
- Members of the South Australian Legislative Council, 1997–2002
- Members of the South Australian House of Assembly, 1997–2002
