= Electoral results for the district of Colton =

South Australian district election results

This is a list of electoral results for the Electoral district of Colton in South Australian state elections.

== Members for Colton ==
Member	Party	Term
Steve Condous	Liberal	1993–2002
Paul Caica	Labor	2002–2018
Matt Cowdrey	Liberal	2018–2026
Aria Bolkus	Labor	2026-present

== Election results ==
=== Elections in the 2020s ===
==== 2026 ====
2026 South Australian state election: Colton
Party	Candidate	Votes	%	±%
Labor	Aria Bolkus	10,988	44.2	+7.4
Liberal	Bec Sutton	6,047	24.3	−28.0
One Nation	Rocco DeAngelis	4,047	17.7	+17.7
Greens	Adelaide Xerri	2,087	8.4	−2.5
Independent	Jake Hall-Evans	441	1.8	+1.8
Animal Justice	Lili Parsons	309	1.2	+1.2
Family First	Mathew Schulz	297	1.2	+1.2
Real Change	Brad Lloyd	140	0.6	+0.6
Australian Family	Tony Schirripa	118	0.5	+0.5
Total formal votes		24,834	95.6	−1.9
Informal votes		1,150	4.4	+1.9
Turnout		25,984	90.5	−0.6
Two-candidate-preferred result
Labor	Aria Bolkus	14,869	59.9	+14.7
Liberal	Bec Sutton	9,965	40.1	−14.7
Labor gain from Liberal		Swing	+14.7	

==== 2022 ====
2022 South Australian state election: Colton
Party	Candidate	Votes	%	±%
Liberal	Matt Cowdrey	13,171	52.3	+6.1
Labor	Paul Alexandrides	9,277	36.8	+3.7
Greens	Deb Cashel	2,759	10.9	+5.6
Total formal votes		25,207	97.5	
Informal votes		657	2.5	
Turnout		25,864	91.1	
Two-party-preferred result
Liberal	Matt Cowdrey	13,816	54.8	−1.4
Labor	Paul Alexandrides	11,391	45.2	+1.4
Liberal hold		Swing	−1.4	

Distribution of preferences: Colton
Party	Candidate	Votes	Round 1	
Party	Candidate	Votes	Dist.	Total
Quota (50% + 1)		12,604		
Liberal	Matt Cowdrey	13,171	+645	13,816
Labor	Paul Alexandrides	9,277	+2,114	11,391
Greens	Deb Cashel	2,759	Excluded	

=== Elections in the 2010s ===
==== 2018 ====
2018 South Australian state election: Colton
Party	Candidate	Votes	%	±%
Liberal	Matt Cowdrey	11,685	47.6	−2.4
Labor	Angela Vaughan	7,733	31.5	−7.7
SA-Best	Jassmine Wood	3,459	14.1	+14.1
Greens	Paul Petherick	1,404	5.7	−1.7
Dignity	Ted Evans	271	1.1	+1.1
Total formal votes		24,552	96.8	−0.6
Informal votes		808	3.2	+0.6
Turnout		25,360	91.9	+3.2
Two-party-preferred result
Liberal	Matt Cowdrey	14,211	57.9	+4.0
Labor	Angela Vaughan	10,341	42.1	−4.0
Liberal hold		Swing	+4.0	

2014 South Australian state election: Colton
Party	Candidate	Votes	%	±%
Labor	Paul Caica	10,394	44.8	−1.5
Liberal	Joe Barry	10,363	44.7	+4.7
Greens	Andrew Payne	1,584	6.8	−1.4
Family First	Kym McKay	859	3.7	+0.2
Total formal votes		23,200	97.3	+1.0
Informal votes		656	2.7	−1.0
Turnout		23,856	93.5	−0.1
Two-party-preferred result
Labor	Paul Caica	11,938	51.5	−2.2
Liberal	Joe Barry	11,262	48.5	+2.2
Labor hold		Swing	−2.2	

2010 South Australian state election: Colton
Party	Candidate	Votes	%	±%
Labor	Paul Caica	9,862	46.5	−11.2
Liberal	Peter Morichovitis	8,393	39.6	+10.1
Greens	Jim Douglas	1,735	8.2	+2.4
Family First	Denis Power	754	3.6	−0.7
Fair Land Tax	Yiannis Stamos	444	2.1	+2.1
Total formal votes		21,188	95.4	
Informal votes		956	4.6	
Turnout		22,144	94.2	
Two-party-preferred result
Labor	Paul Caica	11,432	54.0	−12.1
Liberal	Peter Morichovitis	9,756	46.0	+12.1
Labor hold		Swing	−12.1	

=== Elections in the 2000s ===
2006 South Australian state election: Colton
Party	Candidate	Votes	%	±%
Labor	Paul Caica	11,866	58.2	+16.5
Liberal	Tim Blackamore	5,952	29.2	−9.6
Greens	Heather Merran	1,191	5.8	+0.3
Family First	Victoria de Los Angeles	820	4.0	+1.6
Democrats	Anna Tree	560	2.7	−1.7
Total formal votes		20.389	96.6	+1.1
Informal votes		718	3.4	−1.1
Turnout		21,107	93.5	−0.8
Two-party-preferred result
Labor	Paul Caica	13,522	66.3	+11.7
Liberal	Tim Blackamore	6,867	33.7	−11.7
Labor hold		Swing	+11.7	

2002 South Australian state election: Colton
Party	Candidate	Votes	%	±%
Labor	Paul Caica	8,235	41.7	+5.8
Liberal	John Behenna	7,650	38.8	−1.0
Greens	Jim Douglas	1,077	5.5	+5.5
Independent	Joe Ienco	1,038	5.3	+5.3
Democrats	Caroline Dowd	865	4.4	−8.7
Family First	Andrew Lewis	480	2.4	+2.4
One Nation	Andrew Phillips	220	1.1	+1.1
SA First	Desi d'Orsay-Lawrence	116	0.6	+0.6
Independent	Alison Patterson	52	0.3	+0.3
Total formal votes		19,733	95.5	
Informal votes		939	4.5	
Turnout		20,672	94.3	
Two-party-preferred result
Labor	Paul Caica	10,765	54.6	+5.6
Liberal	John Behenna	8,968	45.4	−5.6
Labor gain from Liberal		Swing	+5.6	

=== Elections in the 1990s ===
1997 South Australian state election: Colton
Party	Candidate	Votes	%	±%
Liberal	Steve Condous	7,690	40.1	−4.4
Labor	Joe Cappella	6,006	31.3	+6.6
Independent	Bob Randall	3,225	16.8	−3.3
Democrats	Anna Tree	2,267	11.8	+6.4
Total formal votes		19,188	96.8	+1.0
Informal votes		628	3.2	−1.0
Turnout		19,816	92.0	
Two-party-preferred result
Liberal	Steve Condous	10,361	54.0	−6.7
Labor	Joe Cappella	8,827	46.0	+6.7
Liberal hold		Swing	−6.7	

1993 South Australian state election: Colton
Party	Candidate	Votes	%	±%
Liberal	Steve Condous	8,609	44.2	−2.1
Labor	Joe Ienco	4,836	24.8	−18.8
Independent	Bob Randall	3,990	20.5	+20.5
Democrats	Fiona Dawkins	1,060	5.4	−3.1
Independent	Kathleen Barrett	423	2.2	+2.2
Call to Australia	David Kingham	245	1.3	−0.4
Natural Law	Andrew Hobbs	179	0.9	+0.9
Independent	Eustace Saltis	140	0.7	+0.7
Total formal votes		19,482	95.9	−1.9
Informal votes		840	4.1	+1.9
Turnout		20,322	93.8	
Two-party-preferred result
Liberal	Steve Condous	11,787	60.5	+9.5
Labor	Joe Ienco	7,695	39.5	−9.5
Liberal hold		Swing	+9.5	
