= Electoral results for the district of Reynell =

South Australian district election results

This is a list of electoral results for the Electoral district of Reynell in South Australian state elections.

== Members for Reynell ==
Member	Party	Term
Julie Greig	Liberal Party	1993–1997
Gay Thompson	Labor Party	1997–2014
Katrine Hildyard	Labor Party	2014–present

== Election results ==
=== Elections in the 2020s ===
==== 2026 ====
2026 South Australian state election: Reynell
Party	Candidate	Votes	%	±%
Labor	Katrine Hildyard	10,280	44.1	−10.4
One Nation	Peter Heggie	6,457	27.7	+27.7
Greens	Miya Tait	2,535	10.9	−0.1
Liberal	Haseen Zaman	1,903	8.2	−16.5
Legalise Cannabis	Adnan Krasniqi	1,118	4.8	+4.8
Family First	Andy Farmer	783	3.4	−6.4
Australian Family	Aaron O'Rourke	222	1.0	+1.0
Total formal votes		23,298	95.4	−0.8
Informal votes		1,132	4.6	+0.8
Turnout		24,430	86.7	−0.7
Two-candidate-preferred result
Labor	Katrine Hildyard	14,013	60.1	−6.6
One Nation	Peter Heggie	9,284	39.9	+39.9
Labor hold				

==== 2022 ====
2022 South Australian state election: Reynell
Party	Candidate	Votes	%	±%
Labor	Katrine Hildyard	12,458	54.5	+10.7
Liberal	Patrick Moller	5,639	24.7	−1.7
Greens	Lisa Adams	2,516	11.0	+5.5
Family First	Radosav Jovanovic	2,237	9.8	+9.8
Total formal votes		22,850	96.2	
Informal votes		902	3.8	
Turnout		23,752	87.4	
Two-party-preferred result
Labor	Katrine Hildyard	15,249	66.7	+7.3
Liberal	Patrick Moller	7,601	33.3	−7.3
Labor hold		Swing	+7.3	

Distribution of preferences: Reynell
Party	Candidate	Votes	Round 1		Round 2	
Party	Candidate	Votes	Dist.	Total	Dist.	Total
Quota (50% + 1)		11,426				
Labor	Katrine Hildyard	12,458	+470	12,928	+2,321	15,249
Liberal	Patrick Moller	5,639	+956	6,595	+1,006	7,601
Greens	Lisa Adams	2,516	+811	3,327	Excluded	
Family First	Radosav Jovanovic	2,237	Excluded			

=== Elections in the 2010s ===
==== 2018 ====
2018 South Australian state election: Reynell
Party	Candidate	Votes	%	±%
Labor	Katrine Hildyard	9,784	47.0	−2.1
Liberal	Laura Curran	4,452	21.4	−8.1
SA-Best	Joanne Mausolf	3,679	17.7	+17.7
Greens	Daniel Jury	1,357	6.5	−2.3
Conservatives	David Sires	860	4.1	−5.0
Dignity	Anna Tree	682	3.3	+3.3
Total formal votes		20,814	94.2	−1.5
Informal votes		1,281	5.8	+1.5
Turnout		22,095	89.0	+2.7
Two-party-preferred result
Labor	Katrine Hildyard	13,427	64.5	+3.4
Liberal	Laura Curran	7,387	35.5	−3.4
Labor hold		Swing	+3.4	

2014 South Australian state election: Reynell
Party	Candidate	Votes	%	±%
Labor	Katrine Hildyard	10,434	49.7	−2.5
Liberal	Heidi Greaves	6,539	31.1	+0.5
Family First	Nick Zollo	2,294	10.9	+2.2
Greens	Robyn Holtham	1,734	8.3	+0.2
Total formal votes		21,001	95.6	−0.5
Informal votes		965	4.4	+0.5
Turnout		21,966	91.7	−1.5
Two-party-preferred result
Labor	Katrine Hildyard	12,600	60.0	−0.5
Liberal	Heidi Greaves	8,401	40.0	+0.5
Labor hold		Swing	−0.5	

2010 South Australian state election: Reynell
Party	Candidate	Votes	%	±%
Labor	Gay Thompson	10,506	52.0	−6.6
Liberal	Shane Howard	6,228	30.8	+7.5
Family First	Geoff Doecke	1,812	9.0	+0.4
Greens	Lisa Adams	1,645	8.1	+3.4
Total formal votes		20,191	95.9	
Informal votes		818	4.1	
Turnout		21,009	93.2	
Two-party-preferred result
Labor	Gay Thompson	12,187	60.4	−8.1
Liberal	Shane Howard	8,004	39.6	+8.1
Labor hold		Swing	−8.1	

=== Elections in the 2000s ===
2006 South Australian state election: Reynell
Party	Candidate	Votes	%	±%
Labor	Gay Thompson	11,653	58.0	+15.2
Liberal	Gary Hennessy	4,850	24.2	−9.2
Family First	Geoff Doecke	1,755	8.7	+1.9
Greens	William Weller	942	4.7	+0.7
Democrats	Yvonne Baillie	472	2.4	−4.5
No Rodeo	Marie Nicholls	403	2.0	+2.0
Total formal votes		20,075	96.1	
Informal votes		815	3.9	
Turnout		20,890	92.6	
Two-party-preferred result
Labor	Gay Thompson	13,568	67.6	+11.8
Liberal	Gary Hennessy	6,507	32.4	−11.8
Labor hold		Swing	+11.8	

2002 South Australian state election: Reynell
Party	Candidate	Votes	%	±%
Labor	Gay Thompson	8,489	43.3	+7.3
Liberal	Julie Greig	6,405	32.7	−5.7
Family First	Kevin Cramp	1,325	6.8	+6.8
Democrats	Graham Pratt	1,312	6.7	−12.2
Greens	Scott Ferguson	829	4.2	+4.2
SA First	Jenny Hefford	696	3.6	+3.6
One Nation	Glen Kelly	527	2.7	+2.7
Total formal votes		19,583	96.4	
Informal votes		739	3.6	
Turnout		20,322	94.1	
Two-party-preferred result
Labor	Gay Thompson	11,078	56.6	+4.8
Liberal	Julie Greig	8,505	43.4	−4.8
Labor hold		Swing	+4.8	

=== Elections in the 1990s ===
1997 South Australian state election: Reynell
Party	Candidate	Votes	%	±%
Labor	Gay Thompson	6,970	36.1	−1.8
Liberal	Julie Greig	6,969	36.1	−10.4
Democrats	Greg Thomas	3,522	18.2	+8.7
Independent	Cathy Crago	1,151	6.0	+6.0
Independent	Dan Moriarty	707	3.7	+3.7
Total formal votes		19,319	95.1	−1.7
Informal votes		993	4.9	+1.7
Turnout		20,312	91.9	
Two-party-preferred result
Labor	Gay Thompson	10,381	53.7	+6.2
Liberal	Julie Greig	8,938	46.3	−6.2
Labor gain from Liberal		Swing	+6.2	

1993 South Australian state election: Reynell
Party	Candidate	Votes	%	±%
Liberal	Julie Greig	8,575	46.0	+11.7
Labor	Susan Lenehan	7,362	39.5	−12.4
Democrats	Gregory Renet	1,966	10.5	−1.7
Independent	John Bentley	745	4.0	+4.0
Total formal votes		18,648	97.1	+0.6
Informal votes		559	2.9	−0.6
Turnout		19,207	93.9	
Two-party-preferred result
Liberal	Julie Greig	9,549	51.2	+10.2
Labor	Susan Lenehan	9,099	48.8	−10.2
Liberal gain from Labor		Swing	+10.2	
