= Members of the South Australian House of Assembly, 2002–2006 =

This is a list of members of the South Australian House of Assembly from 2002 to 2006, as elected at the 2002 state election:

Name	Party	Electorate	Term of office
Hon Michael Atkinson	Labor	Croydon	1989–2018
Frances Bedford	Labor	Florey	1997–2022
Lyn Breuer	Labor	Giles	1997–2014
Mark Brindal	Liberal	Unley	1989–2006
Robert Brokenshire	Liberal	Mawson	1993–2006
Hon Dean Brown	Liberal	Finniss	1973–1985, 1992–2006
Hon Malcolm Buckby	Liberal	Light	1993–2006
Hon Paul Caica	Labor	Colton	2002–2018
Vickie Chapman	Liberal	Bragg	2002–2022
Vini Ciccarello	Labor	Norwood	1997–2010
Hon Patrick Conlon	Labor	Elder	1997–2014
Hon Iain Evans	Liberal	Davenport	1993–2014
Hon Kevin Foley	Labor	Port Adelaide	1993–2011
Robyn Geraghty	Labor	Torrens	1994–2014
Mark Goldsworthy	Liberal	Kavel	2002–2018
Hon Graham Gunn	Liberal	Stuart	1970–2010
Joan Hall	Liberal	Morialta	1993–2006
Martin Hamilton-Smith	Liberal	Waite	1997–2018
Kris Hanna	Labor/Greens/Independent ^{[1]}	Mitchell	1997–2010
Hon John Hill	Labor	Kaurna	1997–2014
Hon Rob Kerin	Liberal	Frome	1993–2008
Hon Stephanie Key	Labor	Ashford	1997–2018
Hon Dorothy Kotz	Liberal	Newland	1989–2006
Tom Koutsantonis	Labor	West Torrens	1997–present
Hon Peter Lewis	Independent	Hammond	1979–2006
Hon Jane Lomax-Smith	Labor	Adelaide	2002–2010
Hon Wayne Matthew	Liberal	Bright	1989–2006
Hon Karlene Maywald	National	Chaffey	1997–2010
Hon Rory McEwen	Independent	Mount Gambier	1997–2010
Dr Duncan McFetridge	Liberal	Morphett	2002–2018
John Meier	Liberal	Goyder	1982–2006
Michael O'Brien	Labor	Napier	2002–2014
Liz Penfold	Liberal	Flinders	1993–2010
Jennifer Rankine	Labor	Wright	1997–2018
Hon Mike Rann	Labor	Ramsay	1985–2012
John Rau	Labor	Enfield	2002–2018
Isobel Redmond	Liberal	Heysen	2002–2018
Joe Scalzi	Liberal	Hartley	1993–2006
Jack Snelling	Labor	Playford	1997–2018
Hon Lea Stevens	Labor	Elizabeth	1994–2010
Hon Bob Such	Independent	Fisher	1989–2014
Gay Thompson	Labor	Reynell	1997–2014
Ivan Venning	Liberal	Schubert	1990–2014
Hon Jay Weatherill	Labor	Cheltenham	2002–2018
Hon Trish White	Labor	Taylor	1994–2010
Mitch Williams	Liberal	MacKillop	1997–2018
Hon Michael Wright	Labor	Lee	1997–2014

^{1} Kris Hanna, the member for Mitchell, was elected as a representative of the Labor Party, but resigned from the party on 30 January 2003 and joined the South Australian Greens. He later resigned from the party on 8 February 2006, after failing to win the top position on their Legislative Council ticket for the 2006 election, and served out the remainder of his term as an independent.
