= Bolkus =

Bolkus is a surname. Notable people with the surname include:

- Aria Bolkus (born 1996/1997), Australian politician
- Nick Bolkus (1950–2025), Australian politician and lawyer
