= Henry Jacques Ninio =

Australian politician

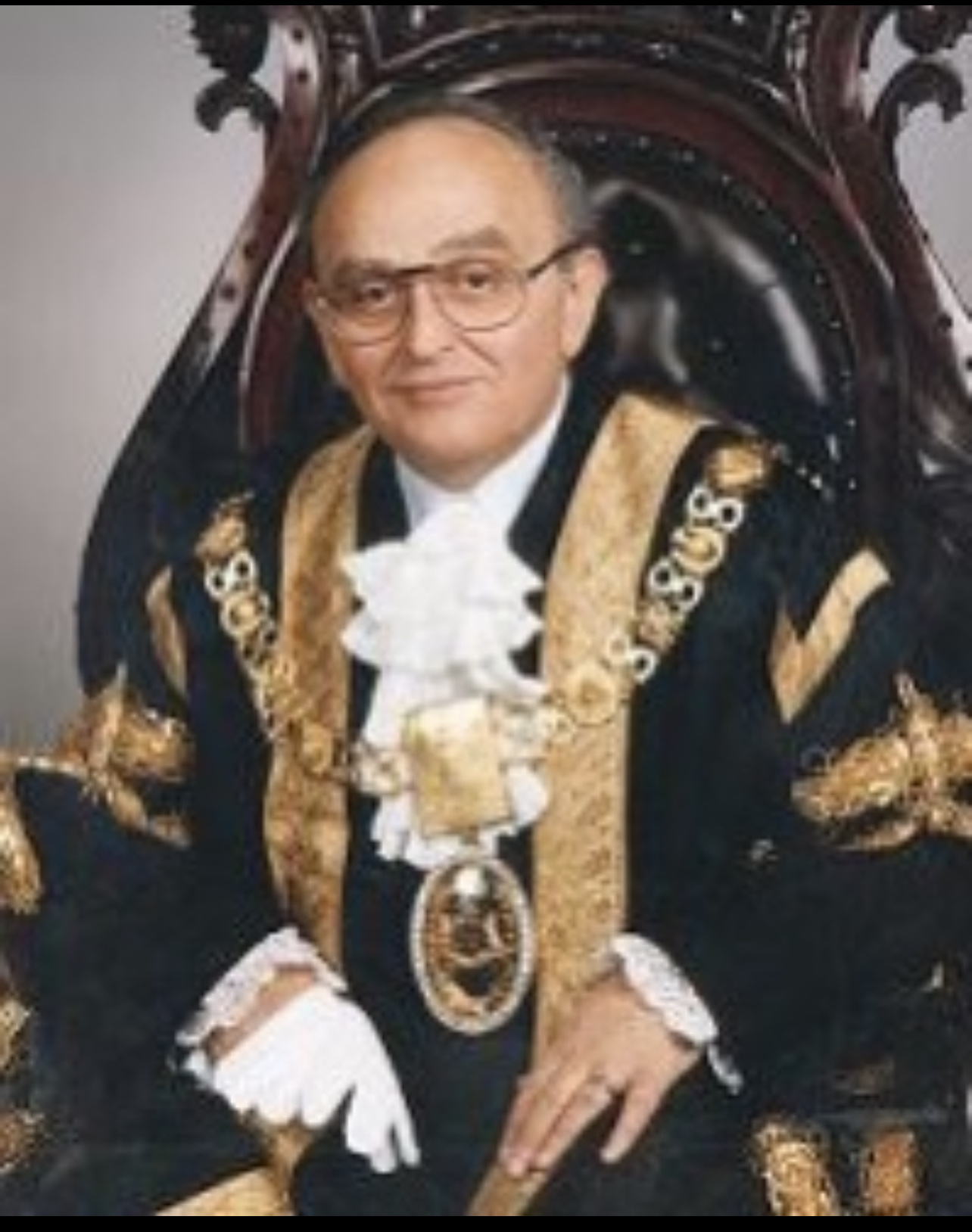

Lord Mayor of Adelaide
- In office 1993–1997
- Deputy: Jane Jose; Michael Harrison; James Crawford; Alfred Huang
- Preceded by: Steve Condous
- Succeeded by: Jane Lomax-Smith

Deputy Lord Mayor of Adelaide
- In office 1991–1992
- Preceded by: Michael Harrison
- Succeeded by: Mark Hamilton
- In office 1987–1988
- Preceded by: Bill Manos
- Succeeded by: Dean Fidock

Personal details
- Born: Henry Jacques Ninio; 27 October 1935 Cairo, Kingdom of Egypt
- Died: 22 September 2023 (aged 87)
- Spouse: Lynette
- Children: 3
- Education: Cairo University

Henry Jacques Ninio (27 October 1935 – 22 September 2023) was an Egyptian-born Australian pharmacist, entrepreneur and politician who served as the 75th Lord Mayor of the City of Adelaide, South Australia.

Ninio was born in Cairo to Sephardic Jewish parents who had migrated from Izmir, Turkey. He attended Cairo University before migrating with his family to Adelaide in 1956, graduating as a pharmacist in 1960. He established the Piaf Perfumery chain and Simes Australia with his business partner Alex Siros.

Ninio was a member of the French Perfume Association of Australia and the Australian Society of Perfumers and Flavourists and an avid collector of antique perfume bottles.

He served as councillor in Gray ward on the Adelaide City Council and then Alderman before being elected Lord Mayor in 1993. He also served as the president of Beit Shalom Synagogue in 1983.

The French Government has honoured him in 1993 as Chevalier de l’Ordre National du Merite for his continued efforts in developing friendship between the two countries of France and Australia.

He was survived by his wife Lynette, 3 children and 6 grandchildren. His daughter, Jacqueline, became a rabbi at the Emanuel Synagogue in Sydney.

== Gallery ==
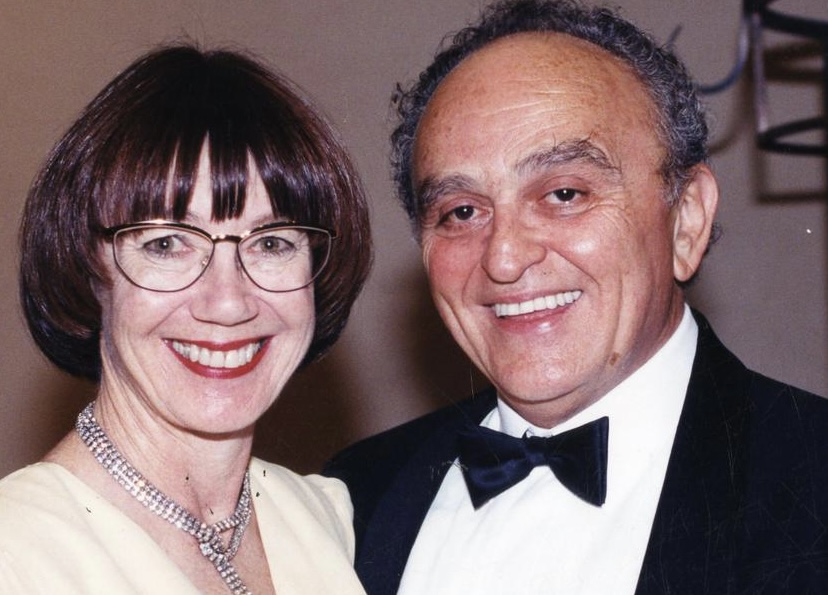
Lynette and Henry Ninio

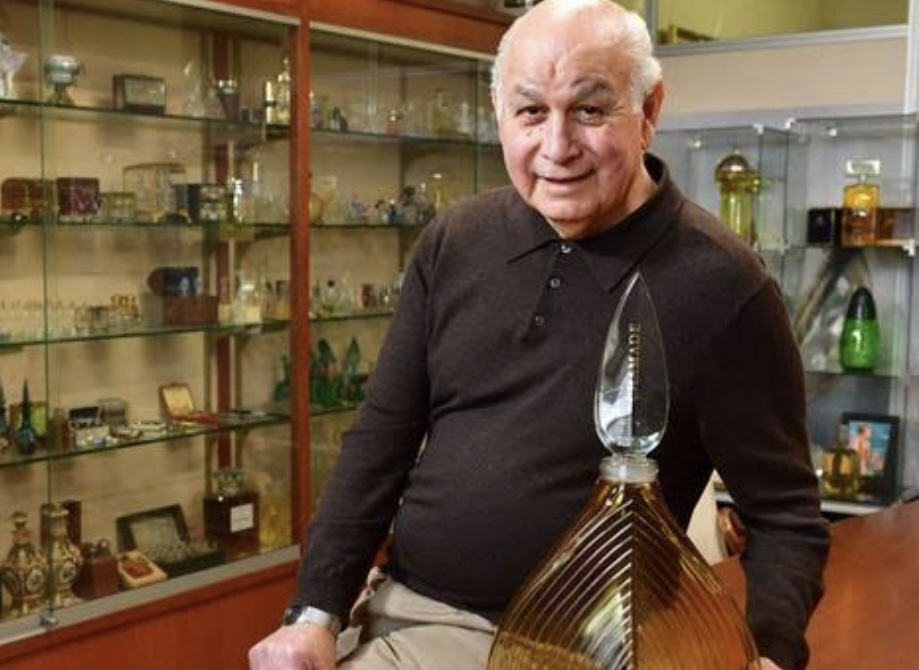
Alex Siros with Simes antique perfume bottle collection

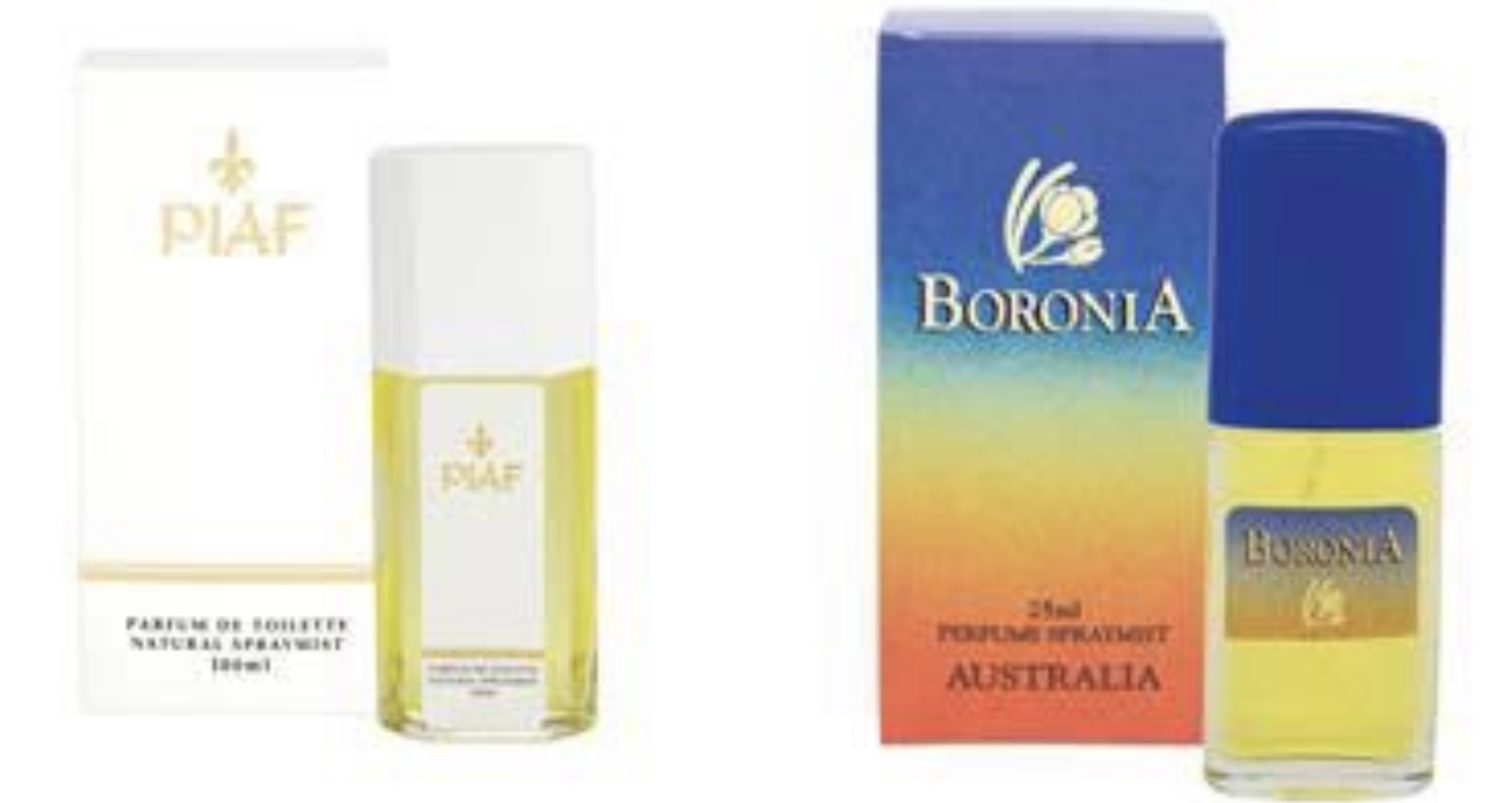
Australian Piaf and Boronia Perfume created by Henry Ninio

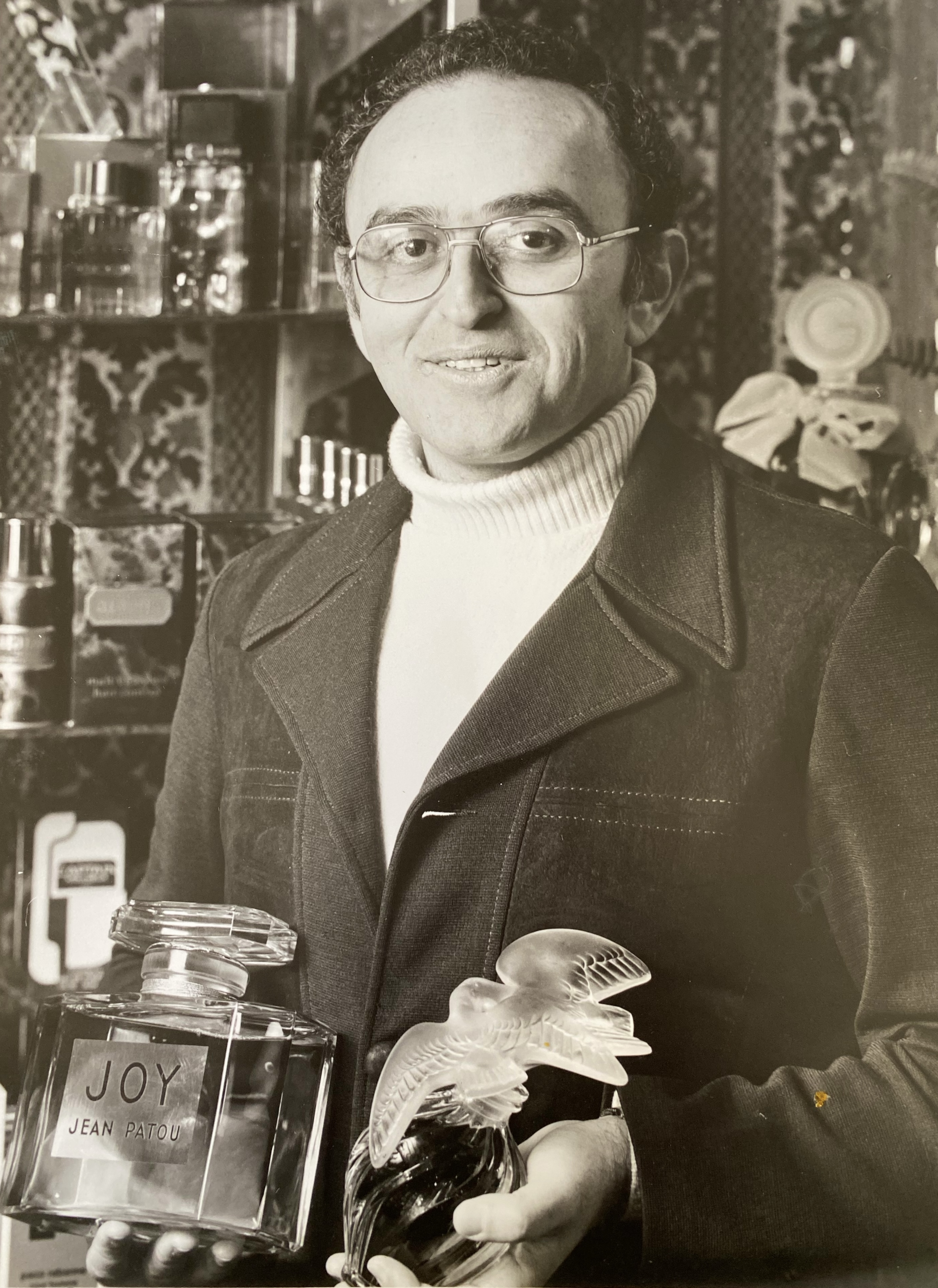
Henry Ninio in Piaf Perfumery Store

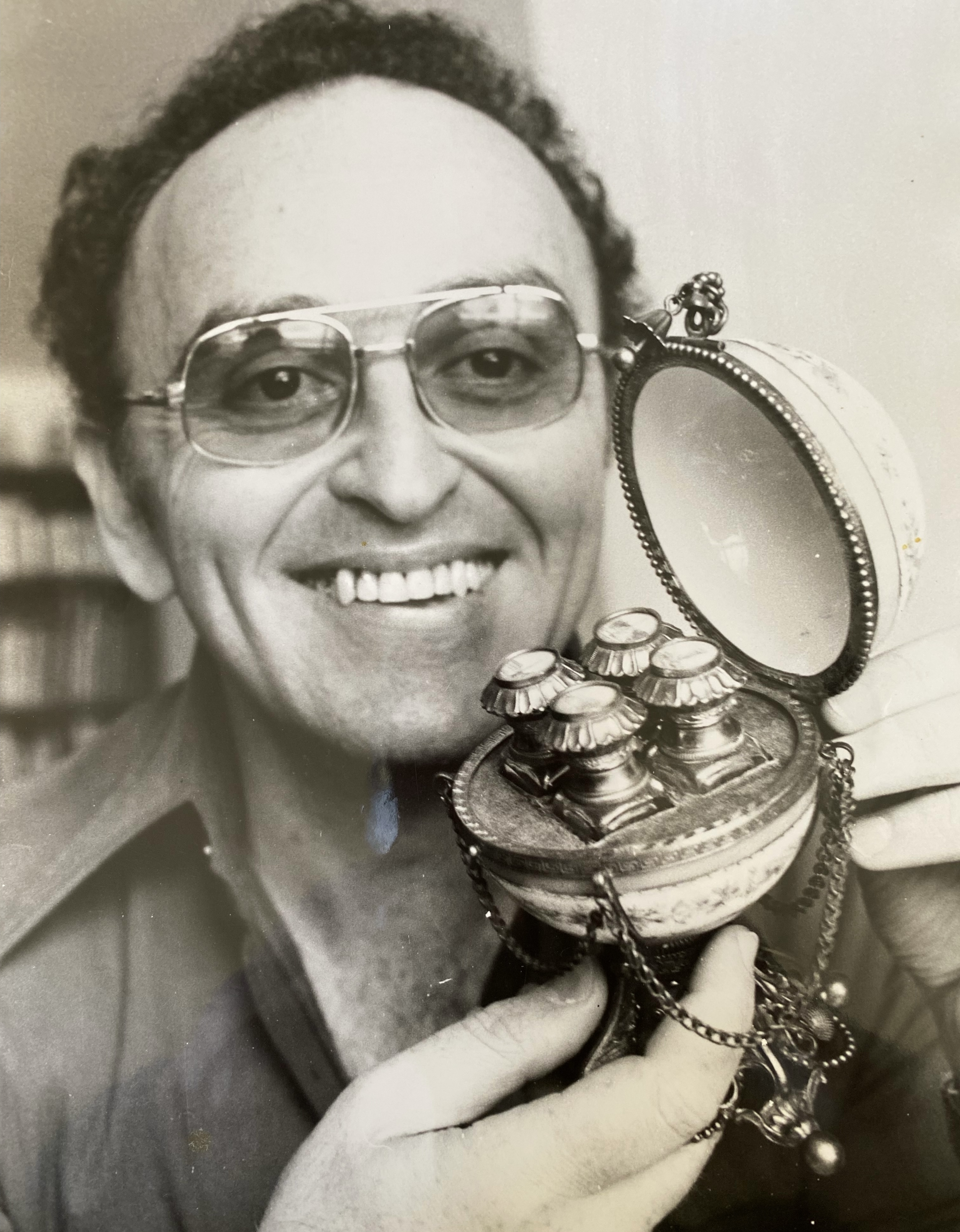
Henry Ninio, antique perfume bottle collector

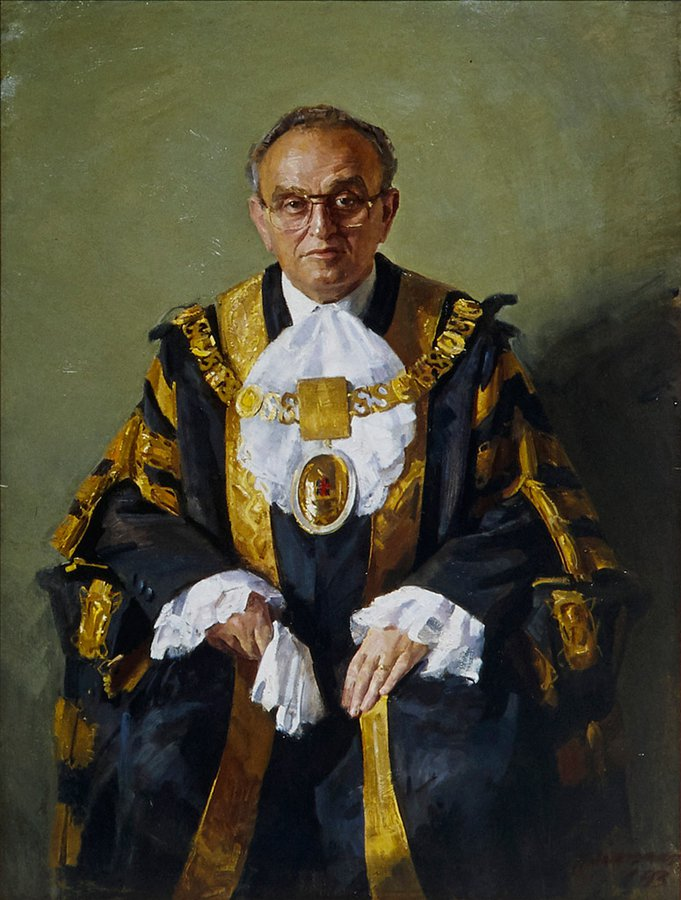
Portrait of Lord Mayor Henry Ninio by Robert Hannaford

Political offices
Preceded by Steve Condous	Lord Mayor of Adelaide; 1995 – 1997	Succeeded by Jane Lomax-Smith
