= Shiels Jewellers =

Australian retail jeweller

- Type: Private
- Industry: Retail
- Founded: 11 November 1945 in Adelaide, Australia
- Founder: Jack Shiels
- Headquarters: Adelaide, Australia
- Areas served: South Australia, Western Australia, Queensland and New South Wales
- Key people: Jack Shiels, Nyra Bensimon, Toby Bensimon, Albert Bensimon
- Products: Jewellery
- Owner: Albert Bensimon
- Website: www.shiels.com.au

Shiels Jewellers is an Australian jewellery retailer and was founded by Jack Shiels in Adelaide in 1945. Since then, Shiels has expanded to 40 stores across South Australia, Queensland, New South Wales and Western Australia, employing over 450 people. Shiels remains headquartered in Adelaide, South Australia, and currently sells bridal and diamond jewellery in a variety of metals, leather items, gemstone jewellery and watches for women, men and children. Shiels Jewellers markets itself as the home of the 1 carat diamond.

== Early history ==
Founded in 1945 by South Australian jeweller Jack Shiels, the business initially had a single store which operated out of Adelaide's Central Market Arcade selling jewellery, giftware and silver-plated merchandise. Jack and his wife ran the family-owned company from for over 32 years.

In 1977, Jack sold his company to Albert Bensimon and his wife, Nyra.

== Recent history ==
Originally, Jack Shiels sold jewellery and giftware. After purchasing the company, Albert and Nyra quickly expanded the selection to include more precious jewellery, including gold, silver and diamonds.

From the single store, Shiels expanded into suburban malls, starting with Westfield Marion. With success in this new setting, Shiels expanded into other malls across Australia, and today has 40 stores across South Australia, Queensland, New South Wales and Western Australia, employing over 450 people.

== Currently ==
While Albert and Nyra Bensimon retain ownership of the company, their son Toby Bensimon took over as Shiels' managing director in 2013. Since then, Toby has continued to grow the brands online presence, resulting in the launch of imprint specialty sites, such as Watch Depot, Luminesce Lab Grown Diamonds and Silver Chic.
