= Aria Bolkus =

Australian politician (born 1990s)

Aria Bolkus MP
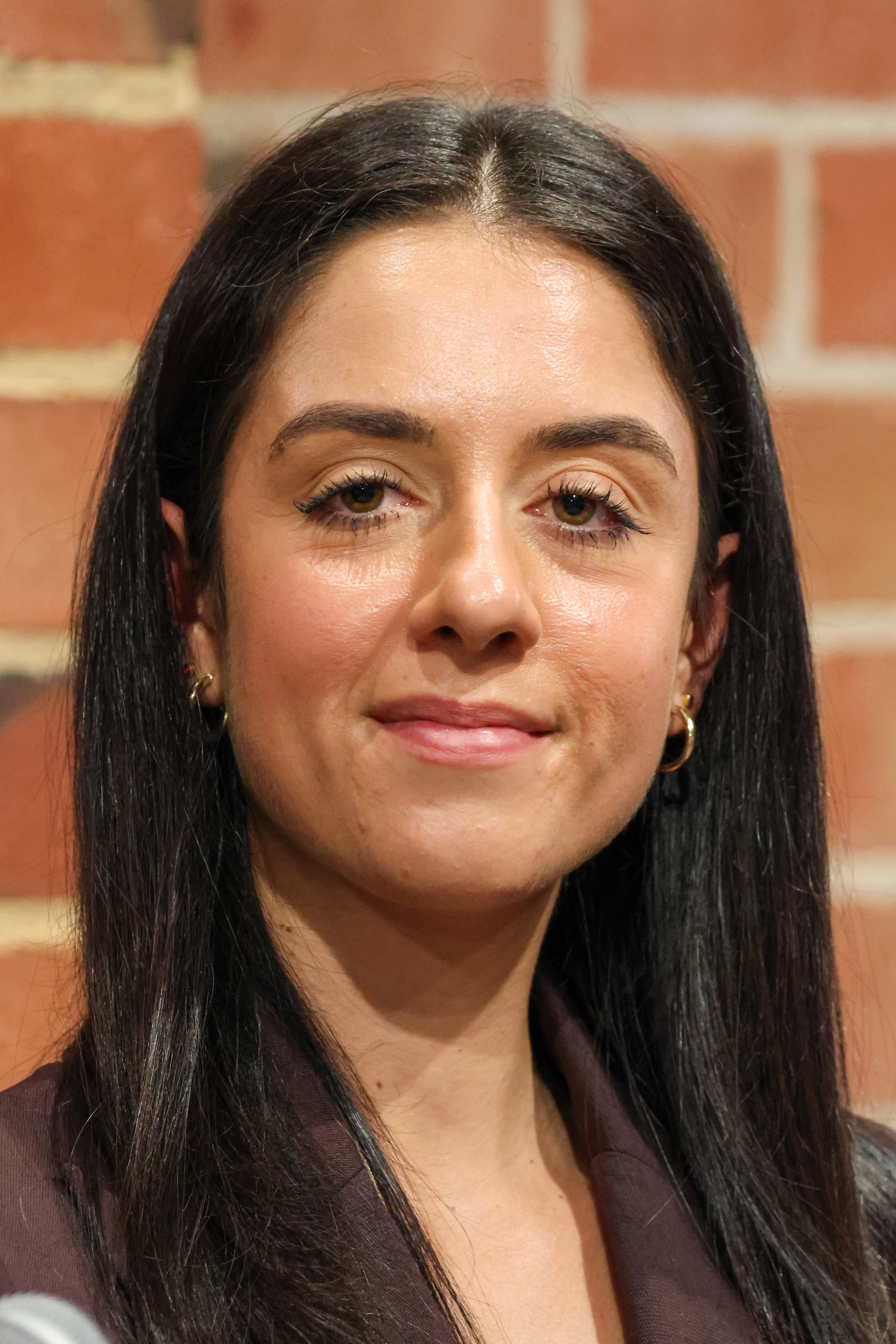
- Bolkus in 2026

Member of the South Australian House of Assembly for Colton
- Incumbent
- Assumed office 21 March 2026
- Preceded by: Matt Cowdrey

Personal details
- Born: Aria Christina Bolkus; 1996 or 1997 (age 29–30)
- Party: Labor
- Parent: Nick Bolkus (father)

Aria Christina Bolkus (born 1996 or 1997) is an Australian politician. She has represented the district of Colton in the South Australian House of Assembly since the 2026 state election. Bolkus is a member of the Australian Labor Party, and has previously served as an advisor to federal MP Mark Butler and worked as a lawyer.

== Early life and education ==
Aria Christina Bolkus was born in 1996 or 1997 to Nick Bolkus, a former senator and cabinet minister in the Hawke and Keating governments. Nick died on 25th December 2025, less than three months before his daughter's election. Aria's grandparents migrated from Greece.

Bolkus attended Henley Beach Primary School as a child, and worked her first job at Joe's Kiosk on Henley Beach as a teenager.

== Career ==
Bolkus was the co-chair of the Hellenic Australian Lawyers Association as of 2024.

Bolkus was announced as a candidate in the 2026 state election for Labor in the district of Colton in June 2025. At the time, she was an advisor to federal MP Mark Butler, and had previously worked as a lawyer.

Bolkus was initially challenging incumbent Liberal MP Matt Cowdrey, a former Paralympian, but he announced his retirement later in June, with Bec Sutton becoming the Liberal candidate in Colton. In the lead-up to the election, Bolkus campaigned with senior Labor members, such as Attorney-General Kyam Maher and Premier Peter Malinauskas, and advocated for a sand replenishment program at West Beach.

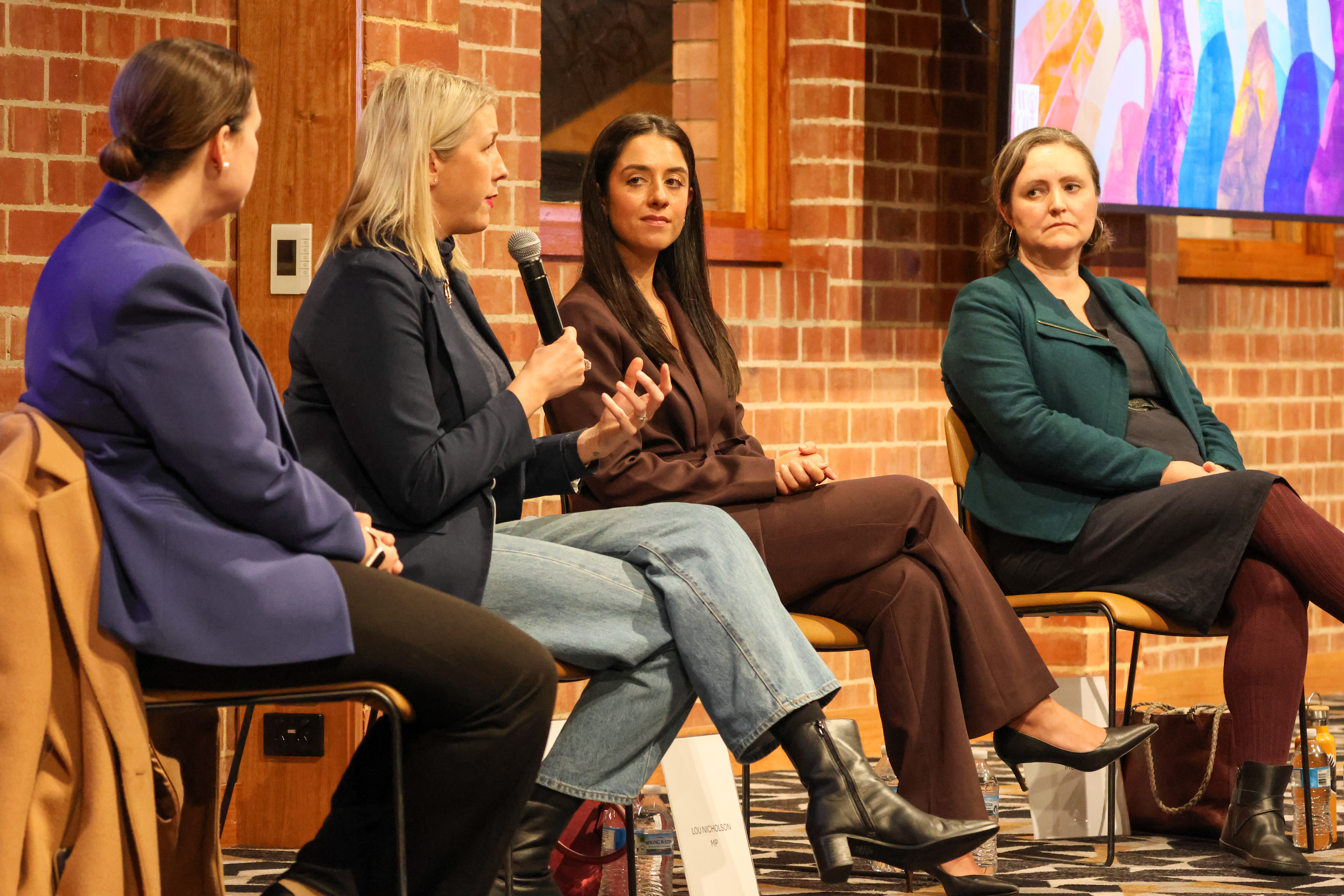
(L–R) Heidi Girolamo, Lou Nicholson, Bolkus and Melanie Selwood at Adelaide University in 2026

Bolkus won the seat of Colton at the 2026 election, defeating Sutton and becoming a member of the House of Assembly.

South Australian House of Assembly
Preceded by Matt Cowdrey	Member for Colton; 2026–present	Incumbent
