= Ruth Russell =

Australian activist

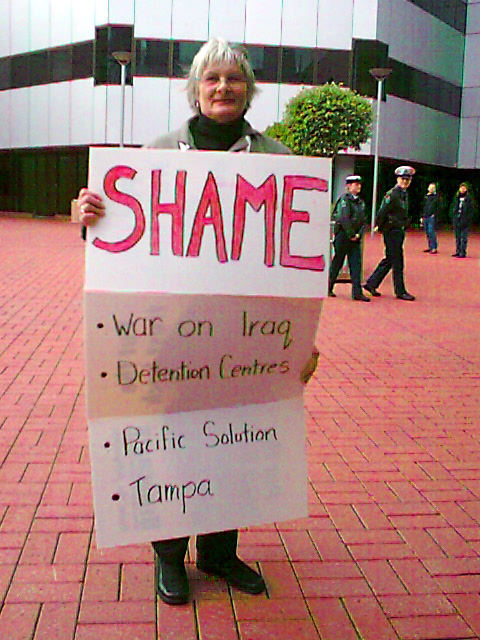
Ruth Russell

Ruth Elizabeth Russell (born 6 March 1946) is an Australian peace activist, and one of five Australian citizens who travelled to Iraq in 2003 to function as a human shield, and for some of the eight weeks was located at the Taji food silo. Her stated reason for doing so was to show "solidarity with the Iraqi civilians who will suffer greatly from the planned invasion of Iraq".

Russell later regretted the choice of the silo, which was later revealed to have contained AWB wheat, who were engulfed over their payment of kickbacks to Saddam Hussein's regime.

Russell was the lead candidate for the Australian Democrats in South Australia at the 2007 federal election to replace retiring senator Natasha Stott Despoja, but the Democrats SA ticket received only 8,908 votes or 0.88 percent, suffering a 1.50 percent swing against them.
