= Terry Cameron =

Australian politician

Terry Gordon Cameron (born 19 October 1946) is a former South Australian politician.

Cameron entered the South Australian Legislative Council in 1994 to fill a Labor Party vacancy, and then was re-elected as a Labor candidate in 1997. However he resigned from the party in order to support the Olsen Liberal government's legislation to lease ETSA in 1998. After resigning, he formed the short-lived SA First party.

He sought re-election to the Legislative Council at the 2006 election as an independent, but was defeated, finishing second-last among the 25 tickets contesting the election.

Prior to entering parliament, Cameron worked for the Australian Workers' Union before becoming State Secretary of the Labor Party.

He is the nephew of Clyde Cameron.
