= Albert Bensimon =

Egyptian-Australian businessman (born 1948)

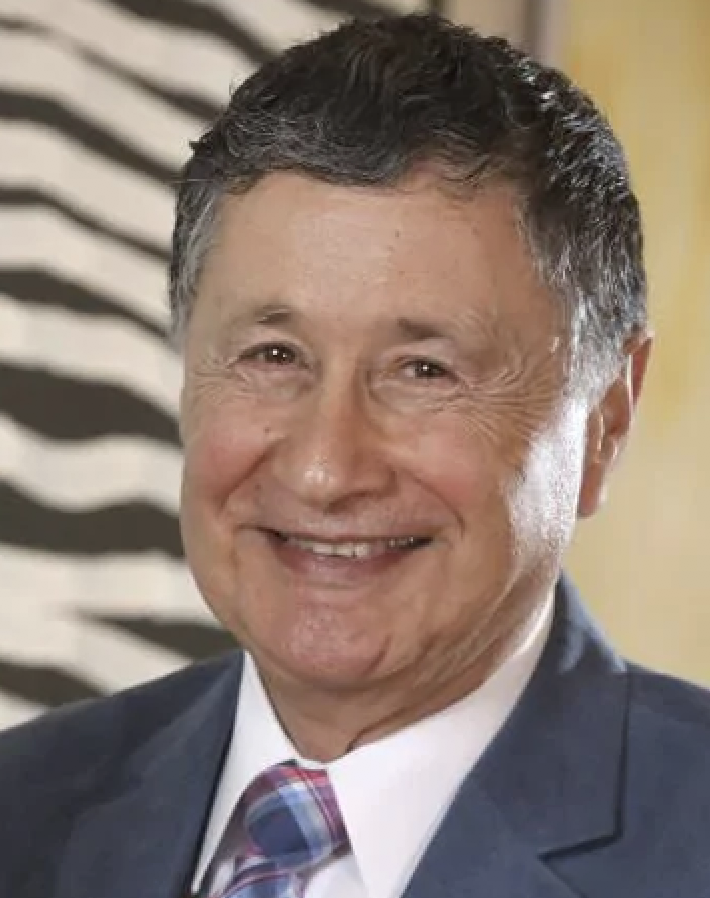
- Born: Albert Bensimon; 1948 (age 77–78); Cairo, Egypt
- Title: OAM
- Partner: Nyra Bensimon

Albert Bensimon (born 1948) is an Egyptian-Australian businessman from Adelaide, South Australia. He is most well known as the owner of Shiels Jewellers. He frequently appeared in television advertisements and became famous for his catchphrase "No Hoo-Haa".

Bensimon was born in Cairo, Egypt. His secondary education took place at the Christian Brothers College in Rose Bay, New South Wales followed by a stint at the London School of Economics. Bensimon is of Jewish and French descent.

In 1994, he helped to establish the Helpmann Academy, named in honour of famous South Australian Sir Robert Helpmann. The academy is designed to promote the arts in South Australia. He was the first chairman and is still a member of its board.

At the 2002 South Australian state election, Bensimon ran as a "No Hoo-Haa Party" candidate in the House of Assembly seat of Adelaide, receiving a primary vote of 2.4 percent (492 votes). His "how-to-vote" ticket indicated a first preference for the Liberal Party of Australia. Bensimon is also a donor to the Liberal Party.

In 2006, Bensimon was rejected twice for membership of the gentlemen's club, The Adelaide Club, which he claimed was due to anti-Semitism. This was denied by the Club president, who stated that it was "offensive" to suggest the club was racist and that it has "a diverse membership". In 2008, when another Egyptian-born Jewish businessman was accepted for membership, Bensimon claimed some credit for the move, saying "I broke the back of a small but influential element within the Adelaide Club."

== Early life ==
In 1969, Albert married and he and his wife Nyra took off on a working holiday to Europe. They travelled on a motorbike for a year and then they decided to come home via Canada. They intended to work for a month in Canada but ended up living there seven years. In 1977, after extensive work experience in marketing studies, the Bensimons decided to return home to Australia. And after many years in marketing, Albert decided to turn his hobby for marketing jewellery into a career and decided to open up a jewellery store.

Albert would then go on to purchase Shiels Jewellers, a local jewellery store in the city from the recently widowed wife of Jack Shiels.
