= Steve Condous =

Australian politician (1935–2018)

Steve Condous AM

Lord Mayor of Adelaide
- In office 1987–1995
- Preceded by: James Bickford Jarvis
- Succeeded by: Henry Jacques Ninio

Member of the South Australian Legislative Assembly for Colton
- In office 11 December 1995 – 9 February 2002
- Preceded by: District created
- Succeeded by: Paul Caica

Personal details
- Born: 10 December 1935
- Died: 22 June 2018 (aged 82)
- Party: Liberal Party
- Spouse: Angela Condous

Steven George Condous AM (10 December 1935 – 22 June 2018) was an Australian politician. From 1987 to 1995, he was the Lord Mayor of Adelaide before retiring to stand for state government. He was a Liberal Party member of the South Australian House of Assembly between 1993 and 2002, representing the electorate of Colton.

Condous was very active in local community causes including community clubs and sporting clubs.

Condous did not re-contest his seat in the 2002 election, which was subsequently won by Labor candidate Paul Caica, defeating Liberal preselect John Behenna.

Condous died on 22 June 2018 at the age of 82.

Civic offices
Preceded by James Bickford Jarvis	Lord Mayor of the City of Adelaide; 1987–1995	Succeeded by Henry Jacques Ninio
Parliament of South Australia
New district	Member for Colton; 1995–2002	Succeeded by Paul Caica
