= Julie Greig =

Australian politician

Julie Mary Greig (born 20 August 1960) is a former Australian politician. She was the Liberal member for Reynell in the South Australian House of Assembly from 1993 until 1997, when she was defeated by Gay Thompson.

Parliament of South Australia
Preceded by New seat	Member for Reynell; 1993–1997	Succeeded by Gay Thompson
