= Paul Caica =

Australian politician

The Honourable Paul Caica

Member of the South Australian Parliament for Colton
- In office 9 February 2002 – 17 March 2018
- Preceded by: Steve Condous
- Succeeded by: Matt Cowdrey

Personal details
- Born: 1957 (age 68–69) South Australia
- Party: Labor Party
- Spouse: Annabel
- Children: 2
- Education: University of Adelaide
- Profession: Firefighter, union official

Paul Caica (born 1957) is an Australian politician, representing the South Australian Branch of the Australian Labor Party. He represented the South Australian House of Assembly seat of Colton from the 2002 election until his retirement in 2018. He served in the state ministry from 2006 to 2013 under both Mike Rann and Jay Weatherill.

== Early life ==
Caica attended Henley Primary and High Schools before graduating from Adelaide University with a Bachelor of Arts in 1985. He was a firefighter for almost 20 years before holding the full-time position of secretary of the South Australian United Firefighters Union between 1991 and 1997 and the National Secretary of the United Firefighters Union from 1998 to 2002 where he represented firefighters on a national basis.

== Parliament ==
Caica was elected as the member for the bellwether seat of Colton at the 2002 election. He is from the Labor Left faction.

Despite the decades-long bellwether history of Colton, the 2016 electoral redistribution saw Colton redrawn from a 1.5 percent marginal Labor seat to a notional 3.7 percent marginal Liberal seat.

Caica announced in February 2017 that he would be retiring from parliament as of the 2018 election.

=== Cabinet ===
He served in the following portfolios in Cabinet:

- Minister for Gambling (2006–2008)
- Minister for Employment, Training and Further Education (2006–2009)
- Minister for Youth (2006–2009)
- Minister for Science and Information Technology (2007–2009)
- Minister for Volunteers (2008–2009)
- Minister for Industrial Relations (2008–2010)
- Minister for Agriculture, Food and Fisheries (2009–2010)
- Minister for Forests (2009–2010)
- Minister for Regional Development (2009–2010)
- Minister for Environment and Conservation (2010–2011)
- Minister for the River Murray (2010–2011)
- Minister for Water (2010–2011)
- Minister for Aboriginal Affairs and Reconciliation (2011–2013)
- Minister for Sustainability, Environment and Conservation (2011–2013)
- Minister for Water and the River Murray (2011–2013)

== Sport ==
At the 2007 World Police and Fire Games in Adelaide, Caica won two gold medals for Angling.

== Family ==
Caica is married with two sons.

South Australian House of Assembly
Preceded by Steve Condous	Member for Colton; 2002–2018	Succeeded by Matt Cowdrey
