= Electoral district of Colton =

South Australian state electoral district

Colton South Australia—House of Assembly
- Interactive map of electoral district boundaries from the 2022 state election (Note: The electorate will have no change in boundaries at the 2026 state election.)
- State: South Australia
- Created: 1993
- MP: Aria Bolkus
- Party: Labor
- Namesake: Mary Colton
- Electors: 27,600 (2018)
- Area: 26.22 km^{2} (10.1 sq mi)
- Demographic: Metropolitan
- Coordinates: 34°54′48″S 138°30′40″E
Electorates around Colton:
Gulf St Vincent	Lee	Cheltenham
Gulf St Vincent	Colton	West Torrens Badcoe Morphett
Gulf St Vincent	Morphett	Morphett

Colton is a single-member electoral district for the South Australian House of Assembly. It is a 26.2 km^{2} suburban electorate on Adelaide's western beaches, taking in the suburbs of Adelaide Airport, Fulham, Fulham Gardens, Glenelg North, Henley Beach, Henley Beach South, Kidman Park, West Beach and part of Lockleys.

== History ==
The electoral district is named after Mary Colton, who arrived in Adelaide in 1839 and worked for the welfare of women and children. She was the President of the Women's Suffrage League, and lived to see the introduction of equal voting rights for women in 1895.

Colton was created to replace the abolished seat of Henley Beach in the 1991 electoral redistribution as a notionally marginal Liberal seat. It was first contested at the 1993 election, where it was won in a large swing to the Liberals by former City of Adelaide Lord Mayor Steve Condous, recording a 60.5 percent two-party vote from a 9.5 percent two-party swing. This was reduced at the 1997 election to 54 percent, and upon Condous' retirement at the 2002 election, it was won by Paul Caica for Labor with a 54.6 percent two-party vote, which increased to 66.3 percent at the 2006 election. This was reduced to 54 percent at the 2010 election and 51.5 percent at the 2014 election.

Caica announced in February 2017 that he would be retiring from parliament as of the 2018 election.

== Bellwether electorate ==
Colton could be considered South Australia's state bellwether seat as it is the only current lower house seat in parliament to have been consistently won by the party to form government. Only Colton and Adelaide changed from Liberal to Labor at the 2002 election when Labor won government from the Liberals, with Adelaide won by the Liberals in 2010. On 2014 election results and a uniform swing, Colton would have been the Liberal's 24th seat to form majority government. The previous, abolished seat of Henley Beach was also won by the government of the day since its creation at the 1970 election. Colton/Henley Beach as the bellwether for decades of elections also concurrently decided the result in the one-seat parliamentary majority outcomes of 1975, 1989, 2002 and 2014.

Despite the long bellwether history, the 2016 redistribution ahead of the 2018 election changed Colton from a 1.5 percent Labor seat to a notional 3.7 percent Liberal seat.

The seat's bellwether streak was broken in the 2022 election, when incumbent Liberal Matt Cowdrey retained the seat despite Labor forming government. Cowdrey actually won enough primary votes to retain the seat outright despite the Liberals' collapse in Adelaide.

== Members for Colton ==
Member	Party	Term
Steve Condous	Liberal	1993–2002
Paul Caica	Labor	2002–2018
Matt Cowdrey	Liberal	2018–2026
Aria Bolkus	Labor	2026–present

== Election results ==
2026 South Australian state election: Colton
Party	Candidate	Votes	%	±%
Labor	Aria Bolkus	7,548	44.9	+8.1
Liberal	Bec Sutton	4,146	24.7	−27.6
One Nation	Rocco DeAngelis	2,789	16.6	+16.6
Greens	Adelaide Xerri	1,471	8.7	−2.2
Independent	Jake Hall-Evans	336	2.0	+2.0
Animal Justice	Lili Parsons	196	1.2	+1.2
Family First	Mathew Schulz	180	1.1	+1.1
Real Change	Brad Lloyd	84	0.5	+0.5
Australian Family	Tony Schirripa	56	0.3	+0.3
Total formal votes		16,806	96.6	
Informal votes		588	3.4	
Turnout		17,394		
Two-party-preferred result
Labor	Aria Bolkus	9,839	60.1	+14.9
Liberal	Bec Sutton	6,538	39.9	−14.9
Labor gain from Liberal		Swing	+14.9	

Results are not final. Last updated on 22 March at 6:03pm ACDT.
