= Electoral district of Reynell =

South Australian state electoral district

Reynell South Australia—House of Assembly
- Interactive map of electoral district boundaries
- State: South Australia
- Created: 1993
- MP: Katrine Hildyard
- Party: Labor
- Namesake: John Reynell
- Electors: 24,828 (2018)
- Area: 33.06 km^{2} (12.8 sq mi)
- Demographic: Metropolitan
- Coordinates: 35°6′50″S 138°30′30″E
Electorates around Reynell:
Gulf St Vincent	Black	Davenport
Gulf St Vincent	Reynell	Hurtle Vale
Gulf St Vincent	Kaurna	Hurtle Vale

Footnotes
- Electoral District map

Reynell is a single-member electoral district for the South Australian House of Assembly. Reynell is a 33.1 km^{2} urban residential and industrial electorate in Adelaide's far south. It includes the suburbs of Christies Beach, Christie Downs, Hackham West, Lonsdale, Noarlunga Centre, O'Sullivan Beach, Port Noarlunga and Reynella, as well as part of Morphett Vale.

== History ==
Reynell is named after John Reynell, a founder of the Agricultural and Horticultural Society of South Australia and noted 19th-century wheat farmer, sheep and cattle breeder, vigneron and winemaker in the area.

It was created for the 1993 state election as a fairly safe Labor seat, but was won by Julie Greig for the Liberals as part of a statewide landslide. It was reclaimed for Labor at the 1997 election by Gay Thompson. Labor's Katrine Hildyard succeeded her at the 2014 election.

== Members for Reynell ==
Member	Party	Term
Julie Greig	Liberal	1993–1997
Gay Thompson	Labor	1997–2014
Katrine Hildyard	Labor	2014–present

== Election results ==
2026 South Australian state election: Reynell
Party	Candidate	Votes	%	±%
Labor	Katrine Hildyard	10,280	44.1	−10.4
One Nation	Peter Heggie	6,457	27.7	+27.7
Greens	Miya Tait	2,535	10.9	−0.1
Liberal	Haseen Zaman	1,903	8.2	−16.5
Legalise Cannabis	Adnan Krasniqi	1,118	4.8	+4.8
Family First	Andy Farmer	783	3.4	−6.4
Australian Family	Aaron O'Rourke	222	1.0	+1.0
Total formal votes		23,298	95.4	−0.8
Informal votes		1,132	4.6	+0.8
Turnout		24,430	86.7	−0.7
Two-party-preferred result
Labor	Katrine Hildyard	14,013	60.1	−6.6
One Nation	Peter Heggie	9,284	39.9	+39.9
Labor hold				
