= Gay Thompson =

Australian politician

Mary Gabrielle (Gay) Thompson (born 29 January 1948) was the Labor member for the South Australian House of Assembly electoral district of Reynell from 1997 to 2014.

Thompson graduated with a Bachelor of Arts degree at the University of Adelaide. Before entering politics she was a quality consultant and an official of the Administrative and Clerical Officers Association. Thompson is and has been actively involved in many community committees and programs.

The 2006 election saw Thompson increase her margin to 17.6%.

She served as Deputy Speaker and Chairman of Committees.

Thompson did not re-contest her seat at the 2014 election.

South Australian House of Assembly
Preceded by Julie Greig	Member for Reynell; 1997–2014	Succeeded by Katrine Hildyard
