= SA First =

Former political party in South Australia

- Founder: Terry Cameron
- Founded: 1999
- Dissolved: 31 December 2002
- Split from: Labor
- Youth wing: SA First Youth
- Membership: 500+
- SA Legislative Council: 1 / 21 (1999–2002)

SA First, also known as South Australia First, was a South Australian political party formed in 1999 by dissident Labor MP Terry Cameron. The party contested the 2002 state election but failed to elect any candidates to the Parliament of South Australia.

== Ideology and policy ==
SA First positioned itself as a pragmatic, centre-based political party which relied on policy initiatives drawn from the experience of its members and professionals. Its flagship was parliamentary reform, which advocated electoral reform, proportional representation, more sitting days and fewer political perks. It also formed a broad range of policy initiatives which were more or less moderate and liberal in their scope.

== Structure ==
The structure of SA First consisted of local branches electing a governing State Conference, which in turn elected an administrative State Executive.

The Party was notable for allowing each MP a conscience vote on each piece of legislation before Parliament.

The annual State Conference consisted of delegates elected by the branches and was the governing body of the party, with the power to determine policy, preselect Upper House candidates and elect the State Executive.

The State Executive was an 11-member body elected largely by the Conference. There were positions of president, vice-president and state secretary, elected by a preferential majority of conference for a two-year term. It followed the Labor Party model of political power lying in the hands of the secretary rather than the president; the president directed debate and the state secretary directed the everyday operations of the party. There were six general members elected by proportional representation for a one-year term. The positions of Youth Representative and Parliamentary Leader were ex officio.

The state was divided up into branches, based around one to nine electorates. Each branch was allocated delegates to State Conference based on one delegate per 10 members (with a cap of 7 delegates to help prevent branch stacking or undue influence by one branch). Branches had an equal say in the preselection of candidates, with a 50% weighting of the vote with State Conference. (cf. Australian Labor Party where the branches have only a 25% weighting, and the Liberal Party where the SEC/FEC preselection college has a 100% weighting).

Youth Members (25 and under), in addition to being members of their local branch, were also automatically members of SA First Youth, which elected delegates to Conference based on its membership and elected a member of the State Executive directly. This 'double representation' helped youth membership and participation within the wider party immensely, with almost 1/3 of delegates from the youth wing of the party as well as 1/3 of the State Executive members.

There were also standing committees such as the Policy Committee, which drafted policy under the direction of a Policy Convener appointed by State Conference.

== Party members ==
At its height SA First had over 500 members which placed it as the third largest party in South Australia, behind the Liberal Party, the Australian Labor Party and on equal par with the Australian Democrats. It attracted members from both sides of the political divide who were looking for a new, moderate political party in which to participate, as well as people who had no prior political experience.

== Parliamentary involvement ==
Together with fellow Labor-Turned-Independent MP Trevor Crothers, SA First shared the balance of power in the South Australian Legislative Council and made it easier for the Liberal Government to pass legislation; previously they had to convince either the Australian Democrats or the Labor Party to pass legislation. SA First MP Terry Cameron was renowned for asking numerous questions in parliament and for making extensive speeches, the longest clocking in at over three hours.

== 2002 election ==
SA First ran 30 candidates in the House of Assembly and 2 in the Legislative Council at the 2002 election. They received between 0.6% and 7.5% of the primary vote in the various Lower House seats and 1% of the vote in the Legislative Council. Their average vote where they fielded a candidate was 2.8%. They failed to win a seat, however post-electoral analysis indicated the party missed out by only 2,000 votes.

== Post-electoral history ==
On 31 December 2002, SA First was deregistered as a political party. Terry Cameron continued to sit as an Independent in the Legislative Council. Up for re-election, he was unsuccessful at the 2006 state election. His preferences were directed towards minor parties in the first instance, and then towards the Liberals ahead of Labor.

Many members went on to join other political parties, primarily the Liberal Party.
