= Electoral results for the district of Fisher =

Results for South Australian state

This is a list of electoral results for the Electoral district of Fisher in South Australian state elections.

== Members for Fisher ==
Member	Party	Term
Stan Evans	Liberal	1970–1985
Philip Tyler	Labor	1985–1989
Bob Such	Liberal	1989–2000
Bob Such	Independent	2000–2014
Nat Cook	Labor	2014–2018

== Election results ==
=== Elections in the 2010s ===
2014 Fisher state by-election
Party	Candidate	Votes	%	±%
Liberal	Heidi Harris	7,413	36.1	+1.0
Labor	Nat Cook	5,495	26.7	+9.0
Independent Continue Such's Legacy	Dan Woodyatt	4,789	23.3	+23.3
Independent Honest True Local	Dan Golding	880	4.3	+4.3
Independent Leading the Community	Rob de Jonge	809	3.9	+3.9
Greens	Malwina Wyra	708	3.4	−1.3
Stop Population Growth Now	Bob Couch	270	1.3	+1.3
Independent Australian Democrats	Jeanie Walker	195	0.9	+0.9
Total formal votes		20,559	96.1	−1.5
Informal votes		841	3.9	+1.5
Turnout		21,400	82.9	−10.5
Two-party-preferred result
Labor	Nat Cook	10,284	50.02	+7.27
Liberal	Heidi Harris	10,275	49.98	−7.27
Labor gain from Independent		Swing	+7.27	

2014 South Australian state election: Fisher
Party	Candidate	Votes	%	±%
Independent	Bob Such	9,038	38.5	+3.6
Liberal	Sam Duluk	8,249	35.1	+7.0
Labor	Jake Neville	4,170	17.7	−8.6
Greens	Malwina Wyra	1,112	4.7	−0.5
Family First	Daryl van den Brink	936	4.0	−0.8
Total formal votes		23,505	97.6	+0.1
Informal votes		582	2.4	−0.1
Turnout		24,087	93.3	−0.3
Two-party-preferred result
Liberal	Sam Duluk	13,456	57.2	+6.5
Labor	Jake Neville	10,049	42.8	−6.5
Two-candidate-preferred result
Independent	Bob Such	13,951	59.4	−8.1
Liberal	Sam Duluk	9,554	40.6	+8.1
Independent hold		Swing	−8.1	

2010 South Australian state election: Fisher
Party	Candidate	Votes	%	±%
Independent	Bob Such	9,094	40.8	−1.8
Liberal	Christopher Moriarty	5,976	26.8	+6.7
Labor	Adriana Christopoulos	4,986	22.4	−4.0
Greens	Penny Wright	1,210	5.4	+1.4
Family First	Trish Nolan	996	4.5	−0.7
Total formal votes		22,262	96.9	
Informal votes		671	3.1	
Turnout		22,933	94.1	
Two-party-preferred result
Liberal	Christopher Moriarty	11,548	51.9	+10.3
Labor	Adriana Christopoulos	10,714	48.1	−10.3
Two-candidate-preferred result
Independent	Bob Such	14,831	66.6	+0.7
Liberal	Christopher Moriarty	7,431	33.4	+33.4
Independent hold		Swing	N/A	

=== Elections in the 2000s ===
2006 South Australian state election: Fisher
Party	Candidate	Votes	%	±%
Independent	Bob Such	9,212	45.2	+11.7
Labor	Amanda Rishworth	5,373	26.4	+4.3
Liberal	Andy Minnis	3,774	18.5	−12.8
Family First	Kathryn Rijken	1,037	5.1	+1.3
Greens	Mark Byrne	699	3.4	+3.4
Democrats	Max Baumann	291	1.4	−5.2
Total formal votes		20,386	97.0	−0.1
Informal votes		631	3.0	+0.1
Turnout		21,017	93.3	−1.0
Two-party-preferred result
Labor	Amanda Rishworth	12,110	59.4	+15.1
Liberal	Andy Minnis	8,276	40.6	−15.1
Two-candidate-preferred result
Independent	Bob Such	13,590	66.7	+4.6
Labor	Amanda Rishworth	6,796	33.3	+33.3
Independent hold		Swing	N/A	

2002 South Australian state election: Fisher
Party	Candidate	Votes	%	±%
Independent	Bob Such	6,708	33.5	+33.5
Liberal	Susan Jeanes	6,275	31.3	−17.5
Labor	Alex Zimmermann	4,422	22.1	−6.4
Democrats	Jason Smith	1,323	6.6	−16.1
Family First	Kylie Borg	764	3.8	+3.8
One Nation	Trevor Mullins	292	1.5	+1.5
SA First	John Chudzicki	258	1.3	+1.3
Total formal votes		20,042	97.1	
Informal votes		599	2.9	
Turnout		20,641	94.3	
Two-party-preferred result
Liberal	Susan Jeanes		55.7	−4.1
Labor	Alex Zimmermann		44.3	+4.1
Two-candidate-preferred result
Independent	Bob Such	12,439	62.1	+62.1
Liberal	Susan Jeanes	7,603	37.9	−21.3
Independent gain from Liberal		Swing	N/A	

=== Elections in the 1990s ===
1997 South Australian state election: Fisher
Party	Candidate	Votes	%	±%
Liberal	Bob Such	10,225	49.5	−14.8
Labor	Tania Farrell	5,849	28.3	+6.0
Democrats	Debbie Jones	4,593	22.2	+10.7
Total formal votes		20,667	96.6	−1.1
Informal votes		728	3.4	+1.1
Turnout		21,395	93.0	
Two-party-preferred result
Liberal	Bob Such	12,361	59.8	−10.9
Labor	Tania Farrell	8,306	40.2	+10.9
Liberal hold		Swing	−10.9	

1993 South Australian state election: Fisher
Party	Candidate	Votes	%	±%
Liberal	Bob Such	12,892	64.3	+18.0
Labor	Warren Smith	4,471	22.3	−18.8
Democrats	Kathryn Warhurst	2,308	11.5	+2.3
Natural Law	Amand Jung	394	2.0	+2.0
Total formal votes		20,065	97.7	−0.4
Informal votes		475	2.3	+0.4
Turnout		20,540	94.8	
Two-party-preferred result
Liberal	Bob Such	14,191	70.7	+17.9
Labor	Warren Smith	5,874	29.3	−17.9
Liberal hold		Swing	+17.9	

=== Elections in the 1980s ===
1989 South Australian state election: Fisher
Party	Candidate	Votes	%	±%
Liberal	Bob Such	11,653	46.4	−0.5
Labor	Philip Tyler	10,238	40.8	−7.6
Democrats	Terry Clark	2,346	9.3	+4.6
Call to Australia	John Watson	511	2.0	+2.0
Independent	Alison Kent	364	1.5	+1.5
Total formal votes		25,112	97.8	−0.3
Informal votes		562	2.2	+0.3
Turnout		25,674	95.7	+0.8
Two-party-preferred result
Liberal	Bob Such	13,323	53.1	+4.2
Labor	Philip Tyler	11,789	46.9	−4.2
Liberal gain from Labor		Swing	+4.2	

1985 South Australian state election: Fisher
Party	Candidate	Votes	%	±%
Labor	Philip Tyler	9,908	48.4	+6.7
Liberal	Grant Chapman	9,612	46.9	+0.7
Democrats	Audrey Sibly	961	4.7	−7.4
Total formal votes		20,481	98.1	
Informal votes		387	1.9	
Turnout		20,868	94.9	
Two-party-preferred result
Labor	Philip Tyler	10,469	51.1	+3.2
Liberal	Grant Chapman	10,012	48.9	−3.2
Labor gain from Liberal		Swing	+3.2	

1982 South Australian state election: Fisher
Party	Candidate	Votes	%	±%
Liberal	Stan Evans	11,436	52.5	−10.0
Labor	Annice Vass	7,156	32.9	+7.8
Democrats	John Coulter	3,188	14.6	+2.2
Total formal votes		21,780	96.4	−1.2
Informal votes		812	3.6	+1.2
Turnout		22,592	93.9	−3.7
Two-party-preferred result
Liberal	Stan Evans	13,030	59.8	−8.9
Labor	Annice Vass	8,750	40.2	+8.9
Liberal hold		Swing	−8.9	

=== Elections in the 1970s ===
1979 South Australian state election: Fisher
Party	Candidate	Votes	%	±%
Liberal	Stan Evans	11,886	62.5	+2.1
Labor	Alvan Roman	4,783	25.1	−14.5
Democrats	Robert Hercus	2,350	12.4	+12.4
Total formal votes		19,019	97.6	+0.1
Informal votes		465	2.4	−0.1
Turnout		19,484	94.3	+0.7
Two-party-preferred result
Liberal	Stan Evans	13,061	68.7	+8.3
Labor	Alvan Roman	5,958	31.3	−8.3
Liberal hold		Swing	+8.3	

1977 South Australian state election: Fisher
Party	Candidate	Votes	%	±%
Liberal	Stan Evans	10,429	60.4	+17.9
Labor	Sean Dawes	6,828	39.6	+6.4
Total formal votes		17,257	97.5	
Informal votes		439	2.5	
Turnout		17,696	93.6	
Liberal hold		Swing	−2.3	

1975 South Australian state election: Fisher
Party	Candidate	Votes	%	±%
Liberal	Stan Evans	8,255	42.8	−16.6
Labor	Geoffrey Anderson	6,163	32.0	−8.6
Liberal Movement	Maxwell Hall	4,601	23.9	+23.9
Australia	Ingrid Temple	206	1.1	+1.1
National	William Donnon	48	0.2	+0.2
Total formal votes		19,273	98.0	+1.0
Informal votes		397	2.0	−1.0
Turnout		19,670	93.5	−0.6
Two-party-preferred result
Liberal	Stan Evans	12,806	66.4	+7.0
Labor	Geoffrey Anderson	6,467	33.6	−7.0
Liberal hold		Swing	+7.0	

1973 South Australian state election: Fisher
Party	Candidate	Votes	%	±%
Liberal and Country	Stan Evans	9,876	59.4	+0.8
Labor	Ronald Caldicott	6,742	40.6	+5.6
Total formal votes		16,618	97.0	−1.8
Informal votes		511	3.0	+1.8
Turnout		17,129	94.1	+0.7
Liberal and Country hold		Swing	−2.4	

1970 South Australian state election: Fisher
Party	Candidate	Votes	%	±%
Liberal and Country	Stan Evans	8,598	58.6	
Labor	Murty Conlon	5,128	35.0	
Independent	Valerie Lillington	942	6.4	
Total formal votes		14,668	98.8	
Informal votes		178	1.2	
Turnout		14,846	93.4	
Two-party-preferred result
Liberal and Country	Stan Evans	9,069	61.8	
Labor	Murty Conlon	5,599	38.2	
Liberal and Country hold		Swing		
