= Rann government =

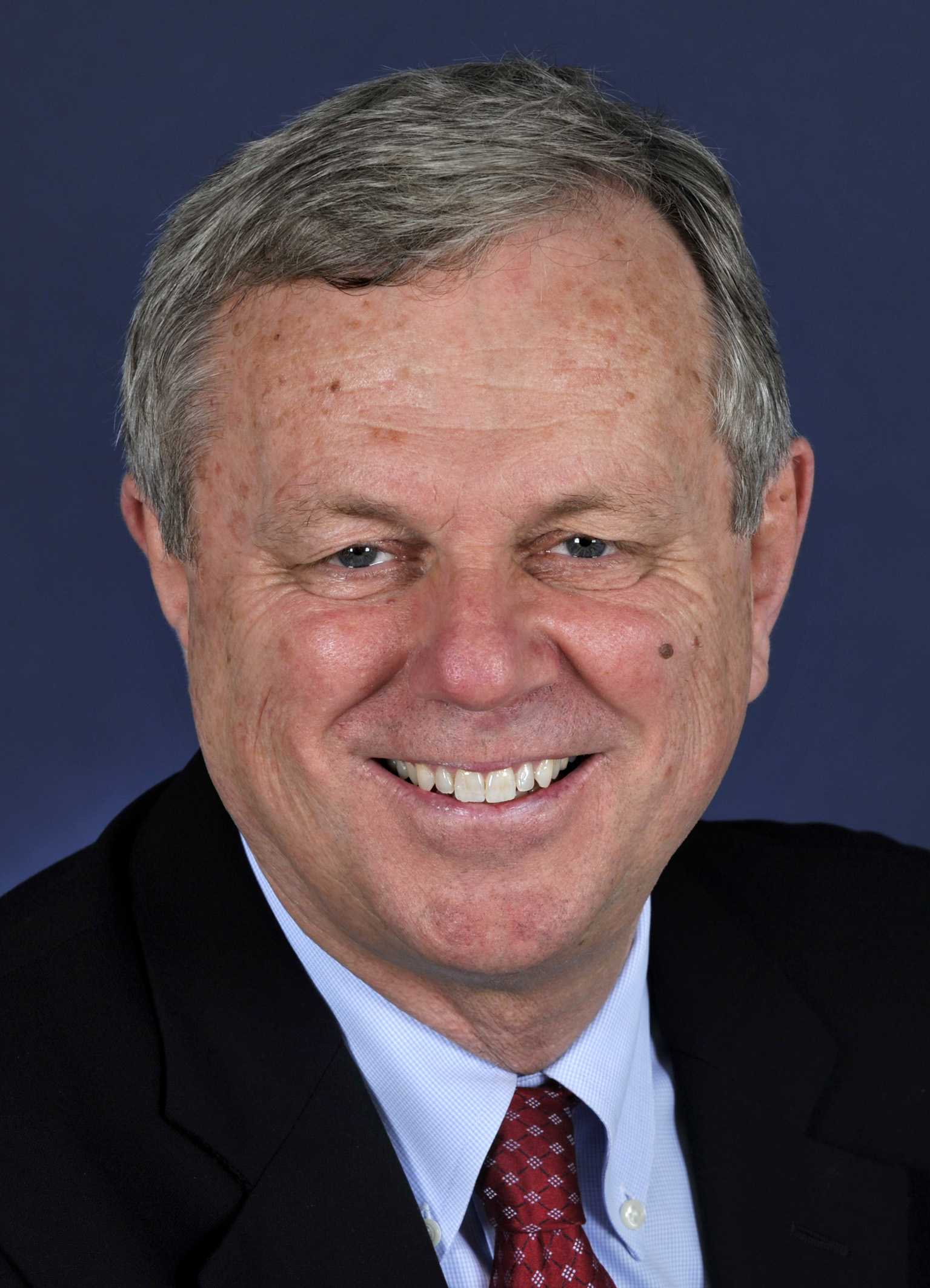
- Rann government 5 March 2002 – 21 October 2011
- Premier: Mike Rann
- Governor: Marjorie Jackson-Nelson; Kevin Scarce
- Cabinet: Rann ministry
- Party: Labor
- Election: 2002 · 2006 · 2010
- Appointed by: Governor
- Seat: Adelaide, South Australia

The Rann government was the state executive government of South Australia led by Premier of South Australia Mike Rann of the South Australian Branch of the Australian Labor Party (ALP) from 2002 to 2011.

Rann is a former Australian politician who served as the 44th Premier of South Australia. He succeeded Lynn Arnold as state Labor leader and South Australian Leader of the Opposition in 1994. He led Labor to minority government at the 2002 election, before attaining a landslide win at the 2006 election. The Rann government was elected to a third four-year term at the 2010 election, retaining majority government despite a swing − giving Labor a record 12 years in government. He resigned as Premier in October 2011 after a year of poor opinion polling saw him lose party support and was succeeded by Jay Weatherill. Rann is the third-longest serving Premier of South Australia behind Thomas Playford IV and John Bannon − the third-longest serving Leader of the Opposition from 1994 to 2002 behind Mick O'Halloran and Robert Richards − and served a record 17 years as South Australian Labor parliamentary leader from 1994 to 2011. He was a South Australian MP in the House of Assembly from the 1985 election and Father of the House from the 2010 election until his parliamentary resignation on 13 January 2012.

The Labor government Rann formerly led, through Weatherill, became the longest-serving South Australian Labor government and the second longest-serving South Australian government behind the Playmander-assisted Thomas Playford IV. Aside from Playford, following the 2014 election it is the second time that any party has won four consecutive state elections in South Australia, the first occurred when Don Dunstan led Labor to four consecutive victories between the 1970 election and the 1977 election. Following the 2014 election, Labor went from minority to majority government when Nat Cook won the 2014 Fisher by-election by five votes from a 7.3 percent two-party swing. Recent hung parliaments occurred when Labor came to government at the 2002 election and prior to that at the 1997 election which saw the South Australian Division of the Liberal Party of Australia, created in 1974, win re-election for the first time.

Achievements of the Rann government include job numbers raised and unemployment lowered, funding increased for health and education, the expansion of mining and defence industries, investment in wind power in South Australia making it the leader of wind power in Australia, and funding increased for new projects including: the Adelaide tram extension and new vehicle purchase, commencement of the rail electrification of Adelaide's train lines, construction commencement of the new Royal Adelaide Hospital, redevelopment of the Adelaide Oval, expansion of the Adelaide Convention Centre, upgrade of the River Torrens Riverbank precinct, redevelopment of the Adelaide Airport, construction of the Port Stanvac Desalination Plant, and the undertaking of various major road works including major upgrades to the North–South Corridor and South Road. His government also introduced Adelaide's Thinker in Residence program, and increased funding to the Festival of Ideas, WOMADelaide, the Adelaide Fringe Festival and the Adelaide Festival of Arts, with the closeness of events on the calendar earning the third month of the year the title of "Mad March". South Australia achieved a AAA credit rating under the Rann Labor government, prompting Business SA chief executive Peter Vaughan to praise Labor's economic management. Rann was often the most popular Premier in the country, with his approach to government generally moderate and crisis-free. Following the 2006 election landslide where Labor was re-elected with a historic 56.8 percent two-party-preferred vote, Newspoll early in 2007 saw Rann peak at a historic 64 percent Preferred Premier rating with a historic 61 percent Labor two-party-preferred vote. University of Adelaide Professor of Politics Clem Macintyre said that after John Bannon and the State Bank collapse, Rann had to re-establish Labor's credentials as an economic manager as a matter of urgency, and "in that sense Rann had a whole lot of priorities to concentrate on that Don Dunstan didn't even think about", with a legacy built on economic achievements, achieving the triple-A credit rating, as well as its capacity to deliver infrastructure projects.

== Electoral background ==
Following the 2002 election, Rann Labor defeated the Kerin Liberal minority government, ending two terms (eight years) of Brown/Olsen/Kerin Liberal governments. Labor formed their own minority government before winning in a landslide at the 2006 election. Labor was elected to a third four-year term at the 2010 election, retaining majority government despite a swing − giving Labor a record 12 years in government. Rann successor Jay Weatherill would go on to form a minority government after the 2014 election, however later that year a majority government was formed resulting from a by-election outcome, giving state Labor a record 16 years in government and will attempt 20 years from a fifth four-year term at the 2018 election. It is South Australia's second longest-serving South Australian government behind the Playmander-assisted Thomas Playford IV. Aside from Playford, for the second time, a party had won four consecutive state elections in South Australia, which occurred first for the second time when Don Dunstan led Labor to four consecutive victories between 1970 and 1977. Other recent hung parliament elections occurred when Labor came to government in 2002, and immediately prior to that when the state Liberal retained government in 1997 which saw the South Australian Division of the Liberal Party of Australia, created in 1974, win re-election for the first time. Labor went from minority to majority government when Nat Cook won the 2014 Fisher by-election by five votes from a 7.3 percent two-party swing which was triggered by the death of Such. Despite this, the Jay Weatherill Labor government kept Brock and Hamilton-Smith in cabinet, giving the government a 26 to 21 parliamentary majority.

== Rann government ==
=== First term ===
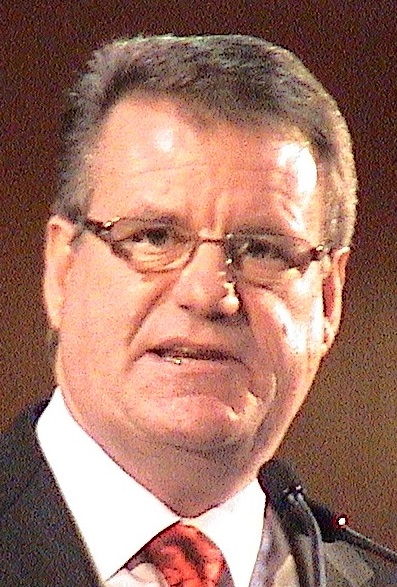
Kevin Foley, longest-serving Deputy Premier of South Australia and third-longest serving Treasurer of South Australia from 2002 to 2011.

First elected Leader of the Opposition following the 1993 election, he remained in the position until the 2002 election. The Labor opposition took two seats from the Liberal minority government, now headed by Rob Kerin. This left Labor one short of majority government while the Liberals were four seats short. Despite this, it initially appeared Kerin would remain in office with the support of four independents. However, one of those independents, former Liberal Peter Lewis, agreed to support Labor in return for a constitutional convention and being named Speaker. Lewis' decision was controversial, prompting Kerin to announce that since the Liberals had won a bare majority of the two-party vote, he would stay in office until Labor demonstrated it had support on the floor of the House of Assembly. Three weeks of deadlock ended when the new legislature met for the first time. With Lewis presiding, Kerin proposed a motion of confidence in his government. The motion failed, and Kerin's government immediately resigned. Rann then advised Governor Marjorie Jackson-Nelson that he could form a government, and was duly sworn in the next day.

In his first term Rann announced: a total ban on the further privatisation of state assets; the introduction of shop trading on Sundays and weekday evenings across the Adelaide metro area; legislated to raise the school leaving age for the first time in 42 years to 16 (later to 17); a central commitment to restore the state's finances to a AAA credit rating; established the Economic Development Board headed by mining magnate Robert Champion de Crespigny; launched a successful campaign to secure the construction of new Air Warfare Destroyers in Port Adelaide and committed the government to build the $400 million Techport maritime precinct and shiplift.

The Rann government pursued new mining projects and introduced the PACE scheme to encourage and subsidise mining exploration. The first term also saw the opening, by Rann, Prime Minister John Howard and NT Chief Minister Clare Martin of the Adelaide to Darwin Railway, the longest north-south railway in the world; a major redevelopment of Adelaide Airport with some state funding, opened by Rann and Howard in October 2005; a commitment to extend the Glenelg to Adelaide tramline and modernise the tram fleet; the announcement that both the US Carnegie Mellon University and the UK's Royal Institution for science education would establish in Adelaide.

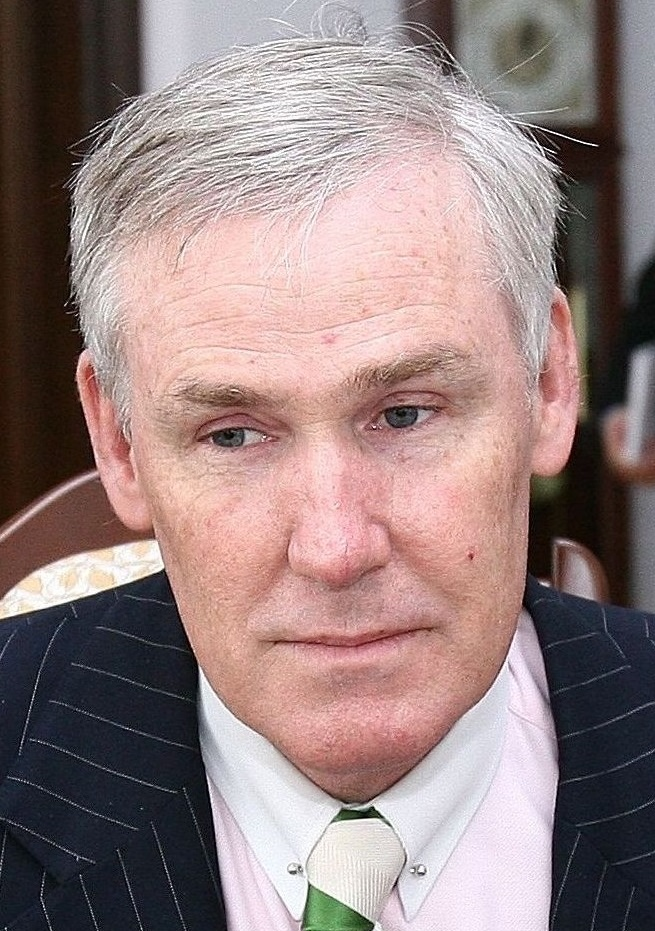
Michael Atkinson, Attorney-General of South Australia from 2002 to 2010.

Rann and Attorney-General Michael Atkinson launched a major law and order initiative with the toughening of laws and sentencing for a wide range of crimes including bushfire arson; a big increase in police numbers and the introduction of DNA testing of prisoners as well as those charged or suspected of crimes, with the most wide reaching legislation in Australia. In 2003 Rann launched the SA Urban Forests initiative to plant a million trees in the Adelaide metro area. This target was later increased to 3 million trees by 2014 to reduce greenhouse gas emissions by 600,000 tonnes of carbon dioxide a year.

In social policy the Rann government established the Social Inclusion Initiative, headed by Monsignor David Cappo, to examine ways to tackle entrenched areas of disadvantage such as rough sleeping homelessness, with the establishment of Common Ground Adelaide and Street to Home initiatives. Rann's government also tackled poor school retention rates with the ICAN initiative and the introduction of the comprehensive Every Chance for Every Child home visiting program for all new babies and their parents. In 2002 Rann launched the Premier's Reading Challenge school literacy initiative, embraced by 95% of public and private schools in South Australia. In 2002 Rann announced and funded the Adelaide Thinkers in Residence program, an idea he developed in Opposition, which brought leading intellectuals from around the world to Adelaide to assist him and the government to initiate reforms and tackle public policy challenges as varied as climate change, early childhood education, city planning and design, ageing policy and science education.

In May 2002, to celebrate the 20th anniversary of the South Australian Film Corporation, Rann announced the establishment of the Adelaide Film Festival with additional funds to enable it to invest in innovative films. In England in June 2002 Rann met with WOMAD founder Peter Gabriel to secure the future of WOMADelaide and make it an annual event.

In 2002 Rann, who had campaigned in Opposition against plans to privatise the Queen Elizabeth Hospital (QEH), announced a major redevelopment for the hospital over ten years. In 2005 Rann and Health Minister Lea Stevens unveiled plans for the QEH's $120 million second stage. It included construction of a new three level inpatient building for maternity, surgical, oncology and renal dialysis patients, and a 580 place car park building. In 2002 Rann announced a $336 million redevelopment of the Lyell McEwin Hospital to effectively double its size. In October 2003 Rann and Health Minister Stevens opened state of the art maternity, obstetrics and gynecology sections as well as a new women's and children's area at the Lyell McEwin. In April 2005 Rann and Stevens opened six new operating theatres, a new Emergency Department, new medical imaging facilities and women's health consulting and treatment facilities. In February 2003 the Rann government approved funding for the construction of a $14 million acute mental health building at the Flinders Medical Centre. The building was named after Margaret Tobin, former Director of Mental Health who was murdered in her office in October 2002.

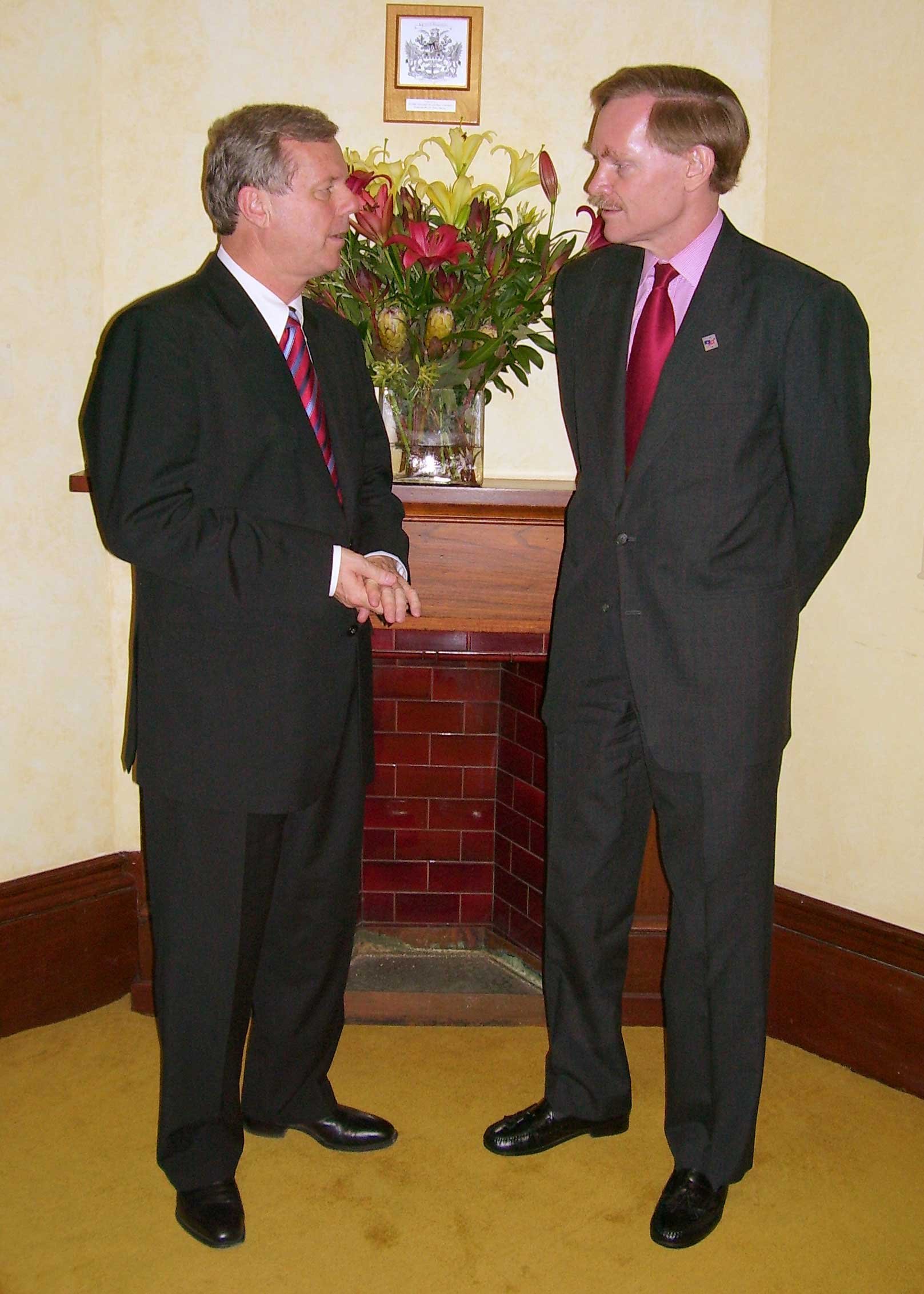
Rann (left) with former US Deputy Secretary of State Robert Zoellick (right) in 2005.

Rann later secured the support of conservative independent Rory McEwen and the Nationals' Karlene Maywald by adding them to his cabinet. He also agreed to back Liberal-turned-independent Bob Such as Speaker after Lewis resigned. South Australia's debt achieved a AAA rating under the Rann Labor government, prompting Business SA chief executive Peter Vaughan to praise Labor's economic management.

In February 2006, Rann, as Minister for the Arts, announced that the Adelaide Fringe Festival would be funded to become an annual event from 2007. Rann was comfortably re-elected in 2006, taking 28 seats to the Liberals' 15—to date, Labor's largest parliamentary majority since the abolition of the Playmander. Labor garnered a two-party vote of 56.8 percent, a significant comeback from its low of 39 percent in 1993 under Arnold. Rann personally likened his government to Don Dunstan's, stating "I'm a totally different person to Dunstan, but in the 70s for different reasons South Australia stood head and shoulders above the crowd. We stood out, we were leaders. The federal government is setting up a social inclusion unit based on ours. Again it's about us not only making a difference locally, but being a kind of model for others, which is what Dunstan used to say he wanted us to be ... a laboratory and a leader for the future." Rann says he expected other reforms to be based upon those enacted under his government, citing the state's strategic plan, a 10-year framework for the development of government and business. "It's a plan for the state, not just promises at each election. A lot of colleagues interstate thought I'd gone mad when we named targets. Well we didn't want to set targets we could easily pass and then pat ourselves on the back for, what's the point of that?" A total of 79 economic and social targets were set, and in 2010 Rann commented "with most of its targets achieved, on track or within reach". However, the state's Integrated Design Commissioner, Tim Horton, said in 2011: "Its targets are really great, but I don't think any of us have signed on to why those targets exist or what we can do to further them. It's a top-down approach. I worry the document exists in the minds of agencies but not in the minds of people."

Rann's achievements included raising job numbers and lowering unemployment, increasing new project funding, increasing expenditure on schools, university, health and mental illness, halving rough-sleeping in the streets, increasing Aboriginal employment, making the state home to the largest amount of wind power in Australia, developing hot rock power, and utilising solar power for the public service. He subsidised theatres, added Guggenheim galleries, introduced the Festival of Ideas and Adelaide's Thinker in Residence program, and encouraged the idea that film festivals fund movies. He introduced WOMAD, the Adelaide Fringe Festival and the Adelaide Festival of Arts, with the closeness of events on the calendar earning the third month of the year the title of "Mad March".

=== Popularity in earlier years ===
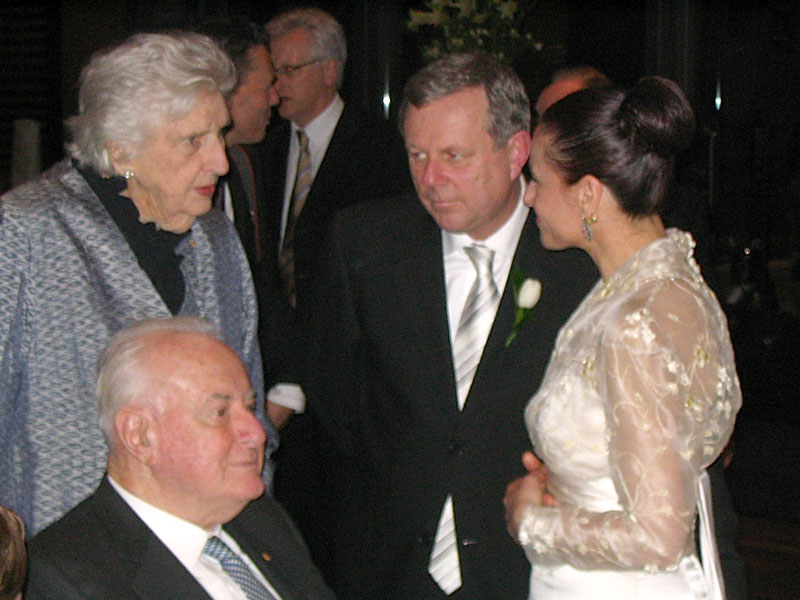
Former Prime Minister of Australia Gough Whitlam with wife Margaret at the wedding of Mike Rann and Sasha Carruozzo in 2006.

During Rann's first and second terms, Rann was often the most popular Premier in the country, with his approach to government generally moderate and crisis-free. Newspoll early in 2007 saw Rann peak at a historic 64 per cent as Preferred Premier, and 61 per cent on the two-party-preferred vote. University of Adelaide Professor of Politics Clem Macintyre said that after the State Bank collapse, Rann had to re-establish Labor's credentials as an economic manager as a matter of urgency, and "in that sense Rann had a whole lot of priorities to concentrate on that Dunstan didn't even think about", with a legacy built on economic achievements, achieving the triple-A credit rating, as well as its capacity to deliver infrastructure projects.

In June 2006, Rann and new Health Minister John Hill announced that the government would replace the current Royal Adelaide Hospital with a $1.7 billion new central hospital on a different site to avoid disruption of patients and staff and higher costs. Controversially they announced that the new hospital would be named after Governor Marjorie Jackson-Nelson because of her decades of fund raising for leukemia research. Following a public backlash the naming decision was later reversed. In June 2007 Rann unveiled the plans for the new hospital, to be built over railway yards on North Terrace between Morphett Street and West Terrace. He announced that the new hospital would be the most technologically advanced in Australia; would have 40 operating theatres and procedure rooms; 880 beds, with 100% being single patient rooms with ensuites (80% having views over the River Torrens) and would be the largest infrastructure project in the state's history.

In 2007, Rann and Tourism Minister Jane Lomax-Smith launched a successful campaign for the Tour Down Under to be the first cycle race outside of Europe to secure ProTour status from the world cycling body, the UCI. Winning ProTour status would guarantee that all the world's top teams would start their annual competition each January in Adelaide. In September 2008 Rann announced that seven time Tour de France winner Lance Armstrong would make his comeback into professional road racing in the 2009 Adelaide event. Armstrong's participation in the 2009 Tour Down Under saw it break all previous records for sporting events held in South Australia. Visitor numbers doubled; the economic impact was more than doubled (from $17.3 million in 2008 to $39 million in 2009) and media coverage increased fivefold.

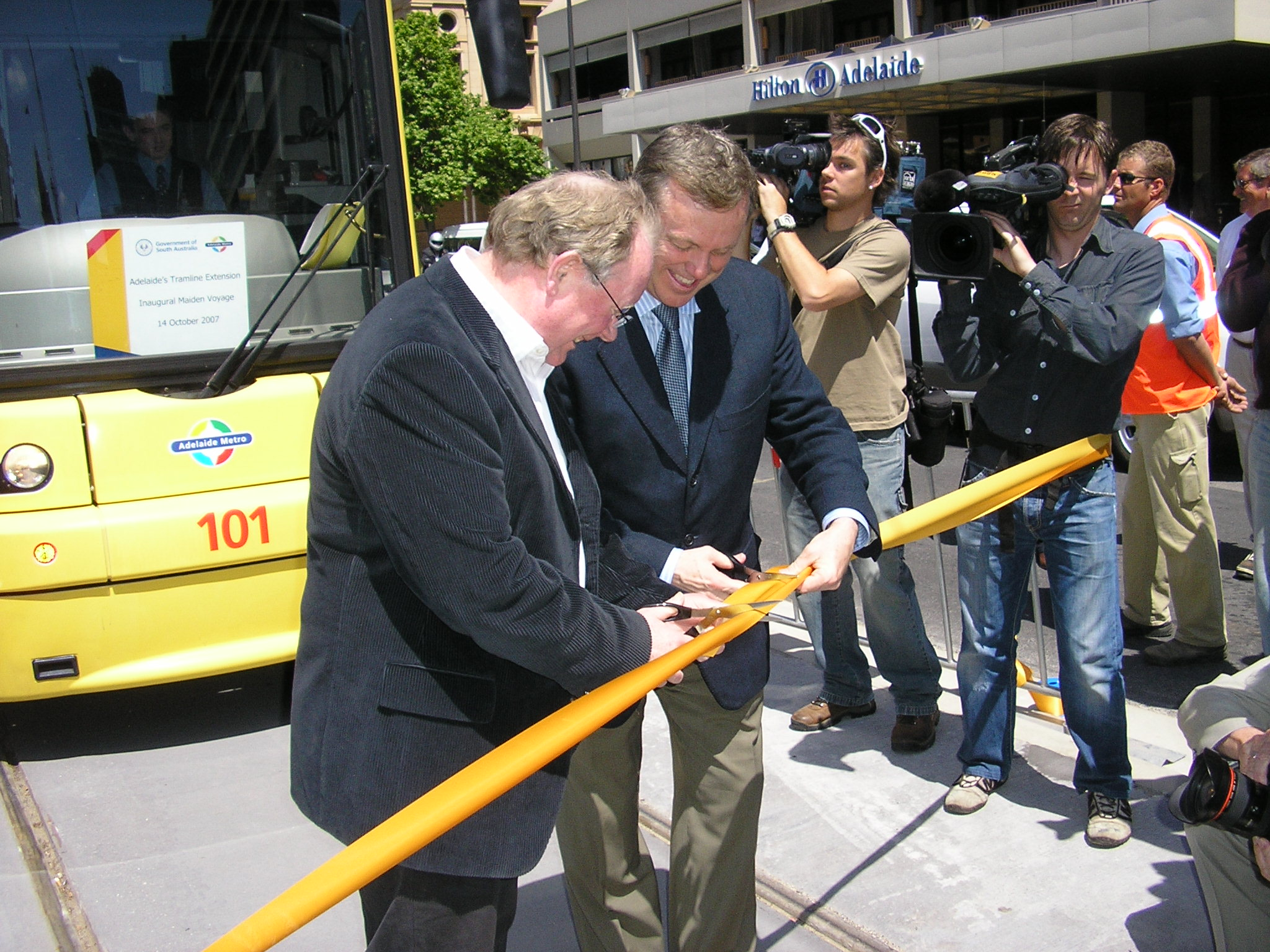
Rann (right) with Minister for Transport Pat Conlon (left) opening the extension of the Glenelg tram line in 2007.

On 11 September 2007, Rann announced that the state government would fund the construction of a new desalination plant to guarantee Adelaide's water supply. He said the plant, to be totally powered by renewable energy, would be "a necessary insurance policy against future droughts." On 13 May 2009, following funding negotiations between Rann and Prime Minister Kevin Rudd, it was announced that the plant would be doubled in size and be capable of supplying 50% of Adelaide's water supply. The project was completed on time and on budget and cost $1.83 billion.

In October 2007, Rann opened an extension of the Glenelg tram line through the city to North Terrace and Morphett Street. He opened a further extension of the tramline along Port Road to the redeveloped and expanded Adelaide Entertainment Centre in March 2010. In November 2007 Rann and Health Minister John Hill announced a $157 million "comprehensive overhaul" of the Flinders Medical Centre, which included an expanded and redeveloped emergency department, new operating theatres, a new cardiac unit, an expanded intensive and critical care unit, and new day surgery unit.

Fourth quarter 2007 polling saw a reduction in the strong support for Rann's Labor government since the previous election, on 54 percent of the two-party-preferred vote, a fall from the previous poll of five percent. Rann's Preferred Premier rating was at 50 percent compared to 25 percent for then Liberal leader Martin Hamilton-Smith. Third quarter 2008 polling saw a more pronounced drop in the primary vote, down three to 38 percent, with the Liberal vote up five to 40 percent, breaking to a two-party vote of 50–50 after preferences – the Preferred Premier figure recorded a six-point drop to 48 percent for Rann and up three to 30 percent for Hamilton-Smith. Some commentators put the poll slump down to "labour movement ructions" over the underfunded WorkCover liability (see 2008 Parnell–Bressington filibuster), consolidation of rural health services, and the continued degradation of the River Murray.

In February 2008, Rann announced that South Australians would be paid 10 cents for every can or bottle they recycled by doubling the container deposit levy. In March 2008 Rann announced that non-reusable plastic bags used in supermarkets would be banned in 2009, preventing 400 million bags each year from entering waste and litter streams each year. He called on other states and territories to follow South Australia's lead, given that 4 billion plastic bags were discarded each year in Australia.

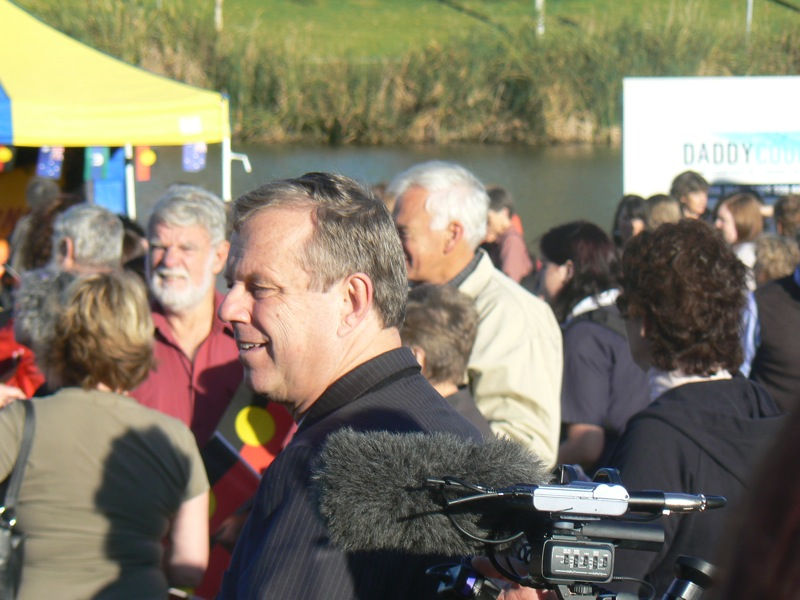
Rann at National Sorry Day in Elder Park, for the apology to the stolen generations in 2008.

Newspoll saw Labor back in a winning position on 54 to 46 in late 2008, and then 56 to 44 in early 2009 along with increases in the Preferred Premier rating. Polling taken from The Sunday Mail during the 50-50 polling suggested that whilst there had been large swings away from the government in country areas, polling held relatively firm at 2006 election levels in the metropolitan areas.

The 2009 Frome by-election sparked by former Liberal Premier Rob Kerin's resignation from parliament saw Labor pick up a small increase in the two-party-preferred vote. This, coupled with the "dodgy documents affair", also known as "dodgy-gate", saw Hamilton-Smith step down from the Liberal leadership, to be replaced by Isobel Redmond. Successful Frome candidate and independent MP Geoff Brock would later prove instrumental to the formation of a fourth-term Labor government.

In May 2009, following funding negotiations between Rann and Prime Minister Kevin Rudd, federal funding of $291 million was announced for railways in Adelaide to extend the Noarlunga line from Noarlunga Centre to Seaford, including a bridge over the Onkaparinga River. The electrification of the line was also announced.

In December 2009, Rann announced a $450 million government commitment to redevelop Adelaide Oval to enable Australian Football League (AFL) Football to be played there. In February 2010 Rann, accompanied by US Deputy Secretary of Defense William J Lynn, opened the Techport maritime hub in Port Adelaide to underpin the $8 billion Air Warfare Destroyer construction and future defence projects. Also in February 2010, during the election campaign, Rann announced a $445 million commitment to duplicate the one-way Southern Expressway. He also announced that to celebrate the fiftieth birthday of the Adelaide Festival of Arts the festival would become an annual event (it previously ran every second year) with more than double its current funding. And on 27 February Rann and Prime Minister Kevin Rudd unveiled plans for the $200 million SA Health and Medical Research Institute (SAHMRI) to be built adjacent to the new Royal Adelaide Hospital.

=== Affair allegations ===
On 22 November 2009, Seven Network's Sunday Night current affairs program aired a paid television interview alleging that Rann had an affair with a Parliament House waitress between March 2004 and October 2005. She blamed the affair for the break-up of her marriage, stating "I lost my family over this", although she later revealed that she wanted her estranged husband back.

The waitress said her husband became aware of her relationship with Rann in 2005, and that her husband wrote a series of letters to the Premier. At a Labor fundraiser at the National Wine Centre on 1 October 2009, a man later identified as her husband was observed to have hit Rann in the face several times with a rolled-up magazine. An aggravated assault charge was laid over the matter. The charge was subsequently downgraded to basic assault. The accused plead guilty to the downgraded charge, and on 4 March 2010 he was given a two-year good behaviour bond, with no conviction recorded.

Rann commented before the interview went to air that claims of a sexual relationship were "wildly sensational", and that once he had seen the program, he would respond with a "brief statement". He also expressed frustration that he had been unable to "clear the air" because matters were before a court.

On 23 November 2009, the day after the allegations were aired, Rann called a press conference where he denied the allegations made in the interview, stating that they were malicious lies aimed at damaging him politically and personally. He said, "I have not had sex with her", that he had "never ever hid the fact that I had a friendship with" the lady "over many, many years, and that friendship was one that was based on confidences and discussions, it was funny, it was flirty, just like any other friendship would be". Rann also responded that "Channel Seven's program was, in my view, outrageous."

In February 2010, the Seven Network paid an out-of-court settlement to Rann and issued an apology for suggesting the affair had an effect on Rann discharging his duties as Premier of South Australia. The following month, during a televised debate as part of the state election campaign, Rann also apologised for any stress that the friendship may have caused.

Polling was conducted by The Advertiser in December 2009 with answers to questions revealing little voter interest in the allegations. Others suggested that it was the turning point for Rann's decline, with the issue causing indirect damage over a sustained period of time.

=== Third term ===
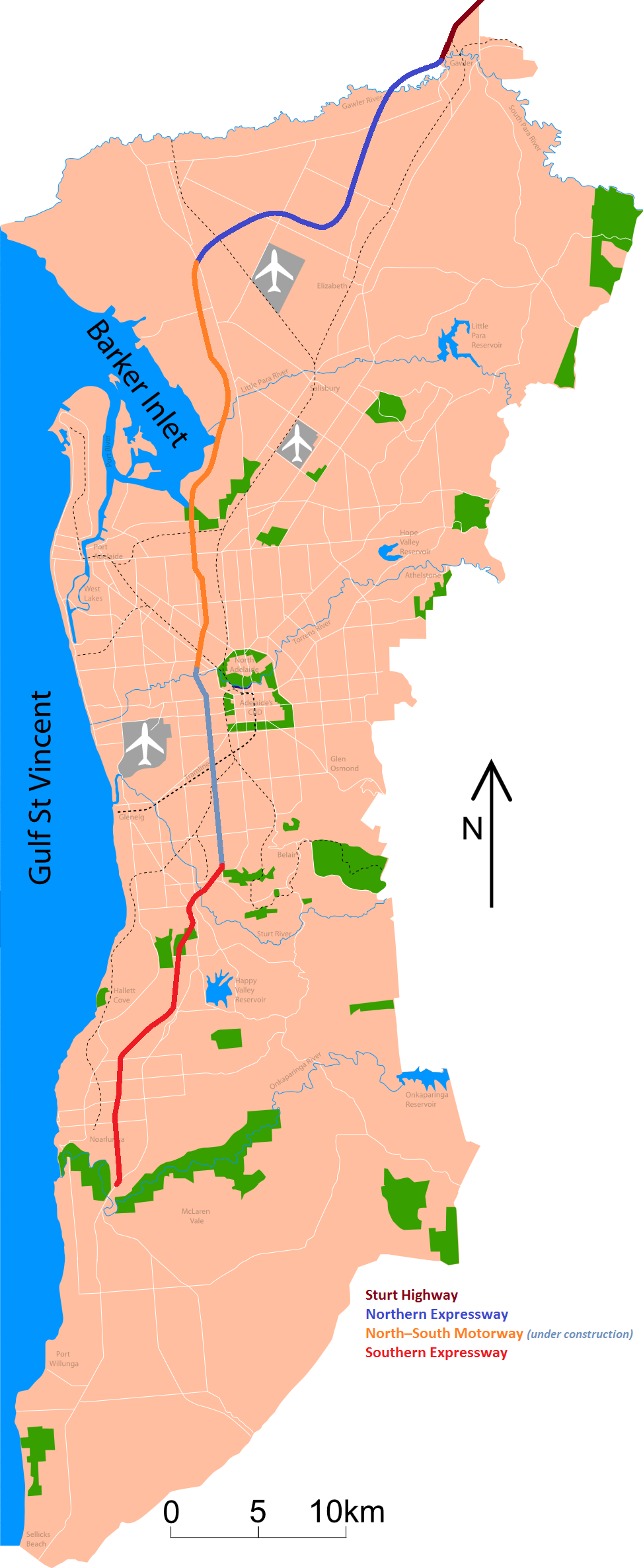
The upgraded North–South Corridor spanning over 100km from Old Noarlunga in the outer southern metropolitan Adelaide suburbs through to Nuriootpa in the inner northern rural area around the Barossa Valley, aiming to be stop-free by 2030.

The Rann Labor government won a third four-year term at the 2010 state election with 26 of 47 seats though with only 48.4 percent of the two-party preferred vote. It was the first Rann Labor election campaign that took to YouTube and social networking. As Labor held government until the 2014 state election, with four-year terms, it was and is the longest-serving period of a South Australian Labor government in history. Rann also served as Labor leader since 1994, a record period as Labor leader.

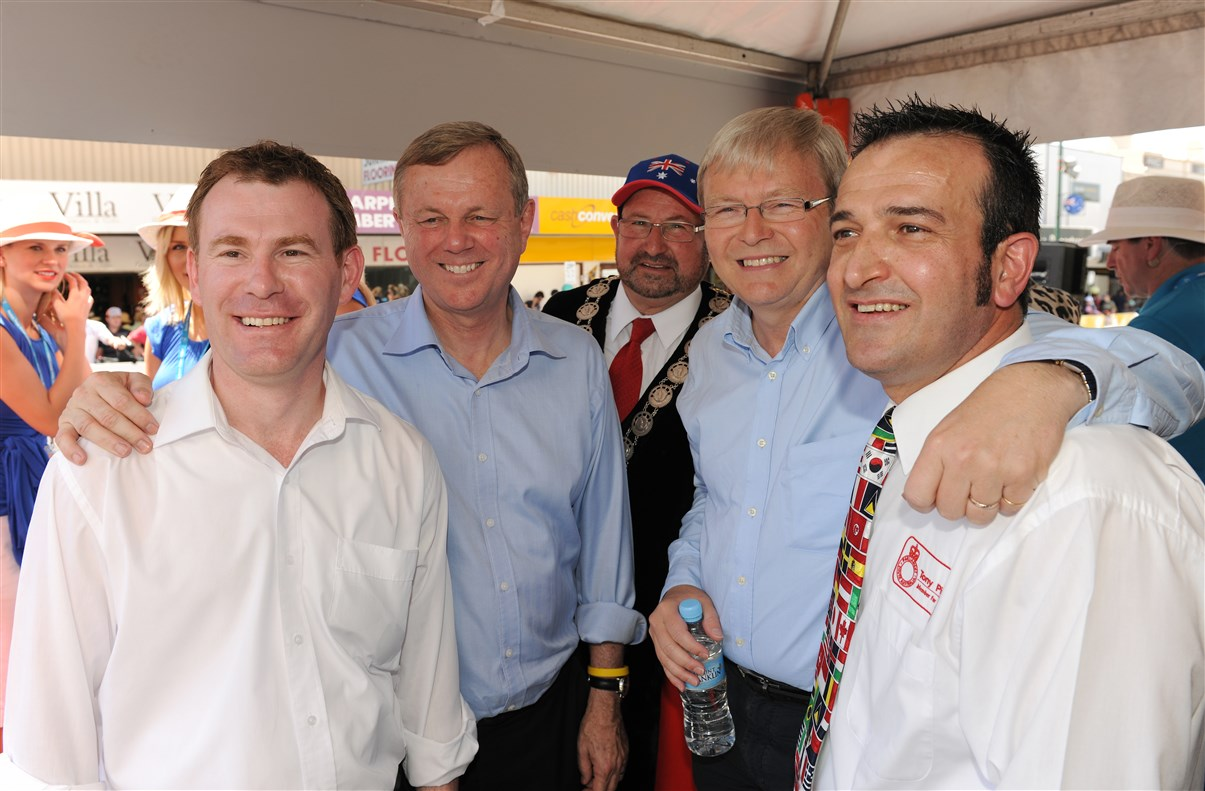
Labor MPs Nick Champion, Rann, Kevin Rudd and Tony Piccolo in Gawler for the Tour Down Under in 2010.

New and continued projects for Rann Labor's third term were claimed to be the biggest infrastructure spend in the state's history, which included rail electrification of Adelaide's train lines, expansion of the Glenelg tram line, construction of the new Royal Adelaide Hospital, the Adelaide Oval redevelopment, expansion of the Adelaide Convention Centre, redesigning the River Torrens Riverbank precinct, expanding mining and defence industries, the Port Stanvac Desalination Plant, and various major road works including further major upgrades to the North–South Corridor.

Public sector budget cuts due to decreased tax receipts stemming from the 2008 financial crisis caused protest amongst unionists and other traditional Labor voters. Rann defeated a motion against his leadership at the yearly Labor convention in 2010.

In early 2011 Rann reshuffled his cabinet after Deputy Premier and Treasurer Kevin Foley resigned from both positions but remained in the cabinet. Attorney-General John Rau became Deputy Premier and Jack Snelling became Treasurer.

In March 2011 Rann announced that a huge area of the Nullarbor Plain, stretching almost 200 km from the Western Australia border to the Great Australian Bight, would be given formal Wilderness Protection status, known as the Nullarbor Wilderness Protection Area. The Premier said the move would double the area of land in South Australia under environmental protection to 1.8 million hectares. The area includes 390 species of plants and a large number of habitats for rare species of animals and birds. In May 2011, after years of negotiations, Rann joined with Federal Defence Minister Stephen Smith and Resources Minister Martin Ferguson to announce that large areas of the Woomera Prohibited Area, the largest defence testing reserve in the world, would be opened up for mining, allowing the future exploitation of mineral deposits estimated at billions of dollars.

The first Newspoll of the third term of the Rann Labor government in March 2011 showed Rann's personal satisfaction-dissatisfaction rating at a new low of 30–59 and a two-party vote of 44–56, a swing against Labor of 4.4 percent since the 2010 election. Labor's primary vote dived to 29 percent, down 8.5 percent, the Liberal vote remained at 42 percent, whilst the Greens surged to 14 percent, an increase of 6 percent, with "other" slightly higher. The subsequent Newspoll saw the two-party vote narrow to 46–54, a swing against Labor of just 2.4 percent, however there was no statistical change in Rann's personal satisfaction-dissatisfaction ratings.

In July 2011, in a move that angered the mining industry, Rann announced permanent protection, including a ban on mining, at the Arkaroola Protection Area of the northern Flinders Ranges, 700 km north of Adelaide. This was followed in October 2011 by special legislation to prohibit mining, mining exploration and grazing. Rann also moved to nominate the Arkaroola area for national and world heritage listing.

In late July 2011, the Australian Broadcasting Corporation and The Advertiser reported that senior figures within Labor had indicated to Rann that the left and right factions had formally decided to replace Rann with Education Minister Jay Weatherill as party leader. A day later, Rann confirmed he would stand down and undergo a party leadership transition to Weatherill, with the handover occurring in October 2011.

=== Parting gestures ===
In the last weeks of Rann's premiership, he signed off on a record $30 billion Olympic Dam mining deal with BHP, opened the new South Australian Police headquarters, and oversaw the commencement of operation of the Port Stanvac Desalination Plant. He voiced his support for a further Glenelg tram line expansion. Rann also voiced his support for same-sex marriage, prompting Liberal leader Isobel Redmond to also support same-sex marriage. Following negotiations in Australia and Mexico, Rann announced in October 2011 that a private university, to be named Torrens University Australia and backed by Laureate International Universities, would be established in Adelaide. It was opened by Laureate's Honorary Chancellor and former US President Bill Clinton in July 2014.

His final public engagement as Premier was the opening of the South Australian Film Corporation's Adelaide Studios. The gala event was interrupted by two protests. The first involved a group of activists opposed to uranium mining, who entered the event wearing faux radiation protection suits and carrying a large banner. His public address was later interrupted by a man offering him a cuttlefish piñata and a copy of The Advertiser to hit it with. Both protests were responses to the possible environmental impacts of BHP's controversial Olympic Dam mine expansion project.

Rann formally resigned from the premiership on 21 October 2011. Jay Weatherill was elected unopposed as his successor.

== See also ==
- Australian Labor Party (South Australian Branch)
