= Plympton Park, South Australia =

Plympton Park
- Suburb
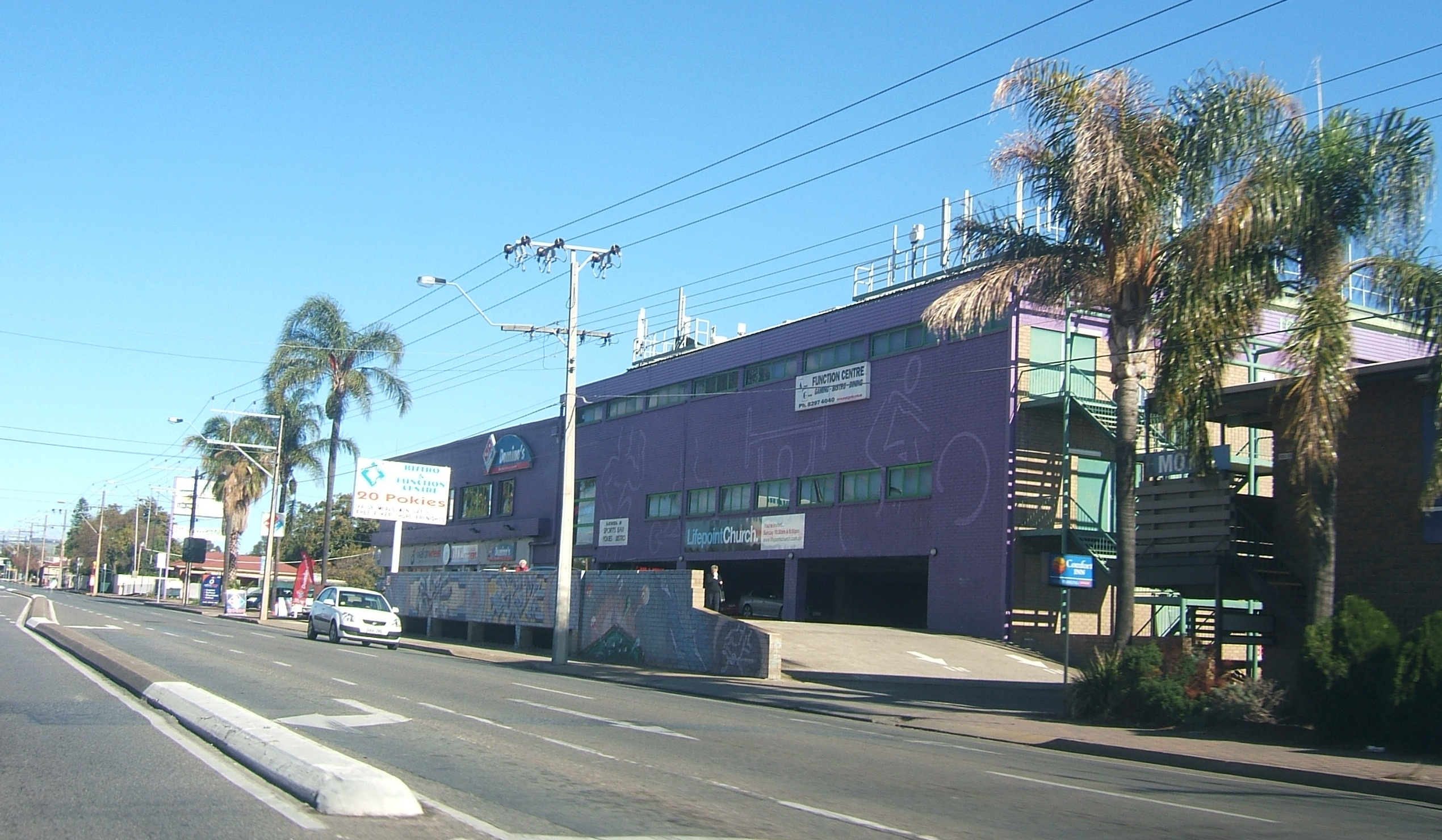
- Fitness centre on Marion Road

- Country: Australia
- State: South Australia
- City: Adelaide
- LGA: City of Marion
- Location: 8 km (5.0 mi) from Adelaide

Government
  - State electorate: Badcoe
  - Federal division: Boothby

Population
  - Total: 3,881 (SAL 2021)
- Postcode: 5038
Suburbs around Plympton Park
Camden Park	Plympton	Plympton
Morphettville	Plympton Park	South Plympton
Morphettville	Park Holme	Ascot Park

Plympton Park is an inner south-western suburb of Adelaide 8 km from the CBD, in the state of South Australia and falls under the City of Marion. The post code for Plympton Park is 5038. It is adjacent to Park Holme, Plympton, South Plympton, and Morphettville. It is bordered to the east by Marion Road, to the west by Park Terrace, to the south by Taranna Avenue and to the north by the Glenelg tram line.

== History ==
The suburb is residential, with many of the houses being Housing SA properties.

The oldest parts of modern Plympton Park can trace their heritage back to the original subdivision of the area in the 1880s, when the Ryan family's farm was first subdivided. This area, bounded by Marion Road, the Glenelg tram line and South Terrace, contains the oldest houses in the area, including one in Arthur Street that dates back to the 1880s, and one adjacent the tram line that can be dated back to the 1890s.

Further subdivision in the 1950s saw the establishment of properties in the southern portion of Plympton Park. This area was originally known as Brayville North. Plympton Park Post Office opened on 1 May 1956.

Today, the South Australian Government (through Housing SA) continues to own many properties in the suburb.

== Facilities ==
There are no schools in the suburb of Plympton Park. Schools in the vicinity include Forbes Primary School in South Plympton, Plympton International College and Plympton Primary School in Plympton, and a Christian R-12 school, Emmaus Christian College, also in South Plympton. Currently, the local zone high school is Plympton International College.

There are a few shops and medical practices on Marion Road and Bray Street. The nearest major shopping centre is located at Kurralta Park.

The Plympton Park Oval on the corner of Park and South Terraces provides a venue for regular local sporting fixtures, including home games for the Plympton Football Club. It also provides playground facilities.

Being adjacent to the Morphettville Racecourse, it attracts horse husbandry facilities and there are many stables near the racecourse. These stables provide free manure to the public and horses can often be seen strolling around the area.

== Transport ==
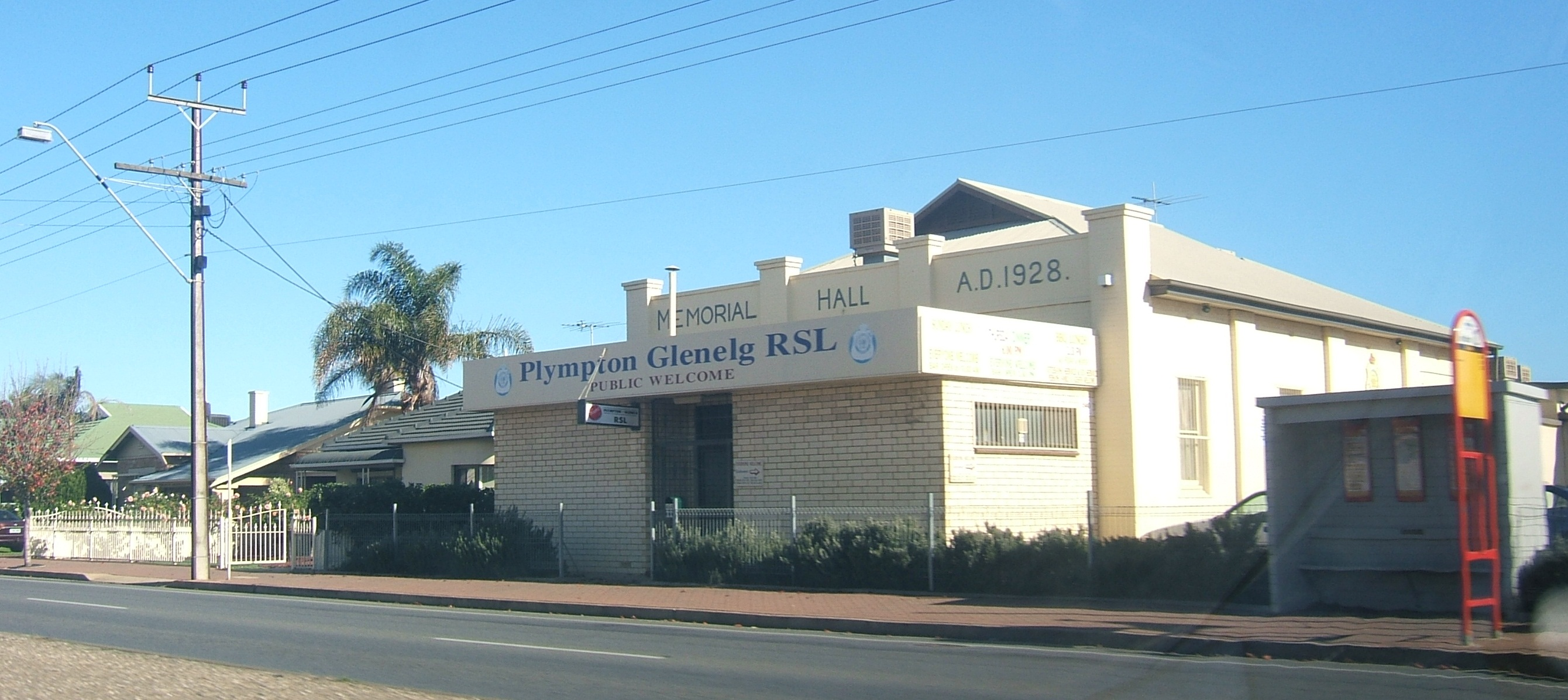
RSL club in Plympton Park.

Marion Road is served by Adelaide Metro M44, 245 and 248 bus services. The 245 and 248 also service South Terrace, Ferry Avenue and Bray Street, while the 190 and 242 also serve Bray Street. The Glenelg tram line runs along the northern edge of the suburb, with tram stop 11 at the western end of Wattle Terrace.

Preceding station	Adelaide Metro	Following station
Marion Road towards Royal Adelaide Hospital, Adelaide Entertainment Centre or Festival Plaza	Glenelg tram line	Morphett Road towards Moseley Square
Marion Road towards Royal Adelaide Hospital, Adelaide Entertainment Centre or Festival Plaza	Glenelg tram line	Morphettville Racecourse (race days only) towards Moseley Square

== See also ==
- List of Adelaide suburbs
