= Electoral results for the district of Hurtle Vale =

South Australian district election results

This is a list of electoral results for the electoral district of Hurtle Vale in South Australian state elections from the district's first election in 2018 until the present.

== Members for Hurtle Vale ==
Member	Party	Term
Nat Cook	Labor	2018–present

== Election results ==
=== Elections in the 2020s ===
==== 2026 ====
2026 South Australian state election: Hurtle Vale
Party	Candidate	Votes	%	±%
Labor	Nat Cook	11,245	45.0	−8.8
One Nation	Katrina Emmerson	6,700	26.8	+26.8
Liberal	Charlotte Grundy	2,531	10.1	−16.5
Greens	Tammy Scott	2,407	9.6	+1.4
Family First	Sarah Kopeikin	851	3.4	−1.1
Legalise Cannabis	Jane Savage	683	2.7	+2.7
Animal Justice	Jannah Fahiz	355	1.4	+1.4
Australian Family	Michael Mitchard	199	0.8	−2.0
Total formal votes		24,971	96.4	+0.7
Informal votes		943	3.6	−0.7
Turnout		25,914	88.1	−1.0
Two-candidate-preferred result
Labor	Nat Cook	15,181	60.8	−4.7
One Nation	Katrina Emmerson	9,790	39.2	+39.2
Labor hold				

==== 2022 ====
2022 South Australian state election: Hurtle Vale
Party	Candidate	Votes	%	±%
Labor	Nat Cook	12,161	53.8	+7.4
Liberal	Nick Robins	6,021	26.6	−4.7
Greens	Joseph Johns	1,850	8.2	+1.2
Family First	David John Sires	1,022	4.5	+4.5
Independent	Rob De Jonge	915	4.0	+4.0
Australian Family	Lionel Zschech	641	2.8	+2.8
Total formal votes		22,610	95.7	
Informal votes		1,019	4.3	
Turnout		23,629	89.1	
Two-party-preferred result
Labor	Nat Cook	14,813	65.5	+7.2
Liberal	Nick Robins	7,797	34.5	−7.2
Labor hold		Swing	+7.2	

Distribution of preferences: Hurtle Vale
Party	Candidate	Votes	Round 1		Round 2		Round 3		Round 4	
Party	Candidate	Votes	Dist.	Total	Dist.	Total	Dist.	Total	Dist.	Total
Quota (50% + 1)		11,306								
Labor	Nat Cook	12,161	+42	12,203	+186	12,389	+354	12,743	+2,070	14,813
Liberal	Nick Robins	6,021	+29	6,050	+290	6,340	+853	7,193	+604	7,797
Greens	Joseph Johns	1,850	+67	1,917	+136	2,053	+621	2,674	Excluded	
Family First	David John Sires	1,022	+394	1,416	+412	1,828	Excluded			
Independent	Rob De Jonge	915	+109	1,024	Excluded					
Australian Family	Lionel Zschech	641	Excluded							

=== Elections in the 2010s ===
==== 2018 ====
2018 South Australian state election: Hurtle Vale
Party	Candidate	Votes	%	±%
Labor	Nat Cook	9,668	42.0	+5.4
Liberal	Aaron Duff	7,239	31.5	−4.5
SA-Best	Michael O'Brien	3,648	15.9	+15.9
Greens	Nikki Mortier	1,123	4.9	−1.8
Conservatives	Bruce Malcolm	885	3.8	−4.4
Dignity	Donovan Cresdee	446	1.9	+1.9
Total formal votes		23,009	95.3	−1.2
Informal votes		1,137	4.7	+1.2
Turnout		24,146	92.5	+3.6
Two-party-preferred result
Labor	Nat Cook	12,726	55.3	+4.0
Liberal	Aaron Duff	10,283	44.7	−4.0
Labor hold		Swing	+4.0	
