= Park Holme, South Australia =

Park Holme
- Suburb
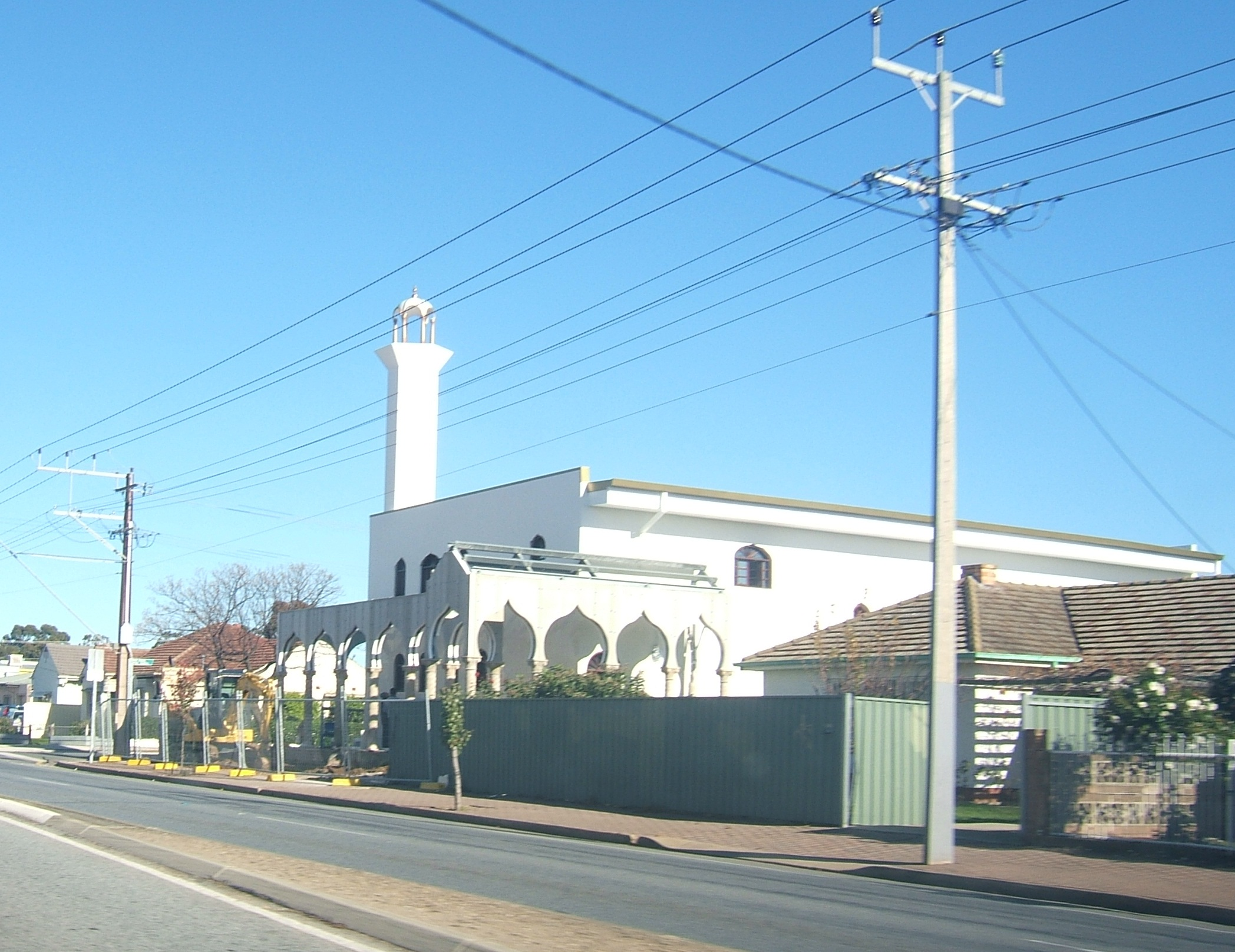
- Mosque on Marion Road

- Country: Australia
- State: South Australia
- City: Adelaide
- LGA: City of Marion

Government
  - State electorate: Morphett
  - Federal division: Boothby

Area
  - Total: 1.15 km^{2} (0.44 sq mi)

Population
  - Total: 3,199 (SAL 2021)
- Postcode: 5043
Suburbs around Park Holme
Glengowrie	Plympton Park	Edwardstown
Morpettville	Park Holme	Ascot Park
Oaklands Park	Marion	Clovelly Park

Park Holme is a south-western suburb of Adelaide in the City of Marion, South Australia, located about 8 km (5 mi) from the Adelaide city centre. It is bordered to the east by Marion Road, to the west by Hendrie Street, to the south by Oaklands Road, and to the north by Tarranna Ave, which is just south of Bray Street. It is adjacent to Ascot Park, Edwardstown, South Plympton, Mitchell Park, Clovelly Park, Glengowrie, Morphettville and Oaklands Park. Park Holme covers 115 hectares (280 acres), (1.15 sq km).

In 2011, the estimated population for Park Holme was 2,599, with a population density of 22.62 persons per hectare, and in 2016, 2,915 with a density of 25.37.

== Transport ==
Two bus routes service the suburb directly: the M44 runs from Golden Grove in the north-eastern suburbs through the city centre, through Ascot Park and its adjoining suburbs to Westfield Marion and the 248 turns off Marion Road at Plympton Park and travels along Hendrie Street until Oaklands Road, stopping outside the Marion Swimming Centre.

The Ascot Park Train Station is east across Marion Road at the southern end of the suburb; the Marion Train station south across Oaklands Road.

== Reserves ==
A large reserve on the corner of Duncan Avenue and Hendrie Street contains a playground, a half-court basketball ring, and bbq facilities. The grounds of South Park Holme Tennis club on the corner of Ragless Avenue and Sanderson Avenue contains a public playground. Mulcra Avenue Reserve contains a playground refurbished in 2012 and a full size basketball court and tennis court on asphalt.

== Facilities ==
Despite being named for the neighbouring suburb, the Ascot Park Primary School, bounded by Marion Road, Pildappa Avenue and Duncan Avenue, is located in the suburb of Park Holme. The site is also home to Warradale Community Child Care Centre, Kilparrin Teaching and Assessment School for students with sensory impairment (vising and/or hearing) and additional disabilities, and the South Australian School for the Vision Impaired. Ascot Park Kindergarten is also located in the suburb of Park Holme, on Marion Road.

Marion Library Service maintains a Park Holme branch on Duncan Avenue.

Marion Council provides a public venue for hire; the Park Holme Community Hall is located at 638 Marion Road and houses community events and classes.

Marion Swimming Centre is situated on Hendrie Street between Oaklands Road and Duncan Avenue. It is an outdoor swimming centre open from mid-spring to mid-autumn.

Oaklands Park SA Aquatic and Westfield Marion shopping centre are a few minutes' drive.

The suburb contains Springpark Baptist Church on Hendrie Street.

The Islamic Society of South Australia maintains a mosque on the corner of Marion Road and Condada Avenue known as Masjid Omar Bin Al Khattab or Marion Masjid.

Park Holme Post Office opened on 23 June 1960.

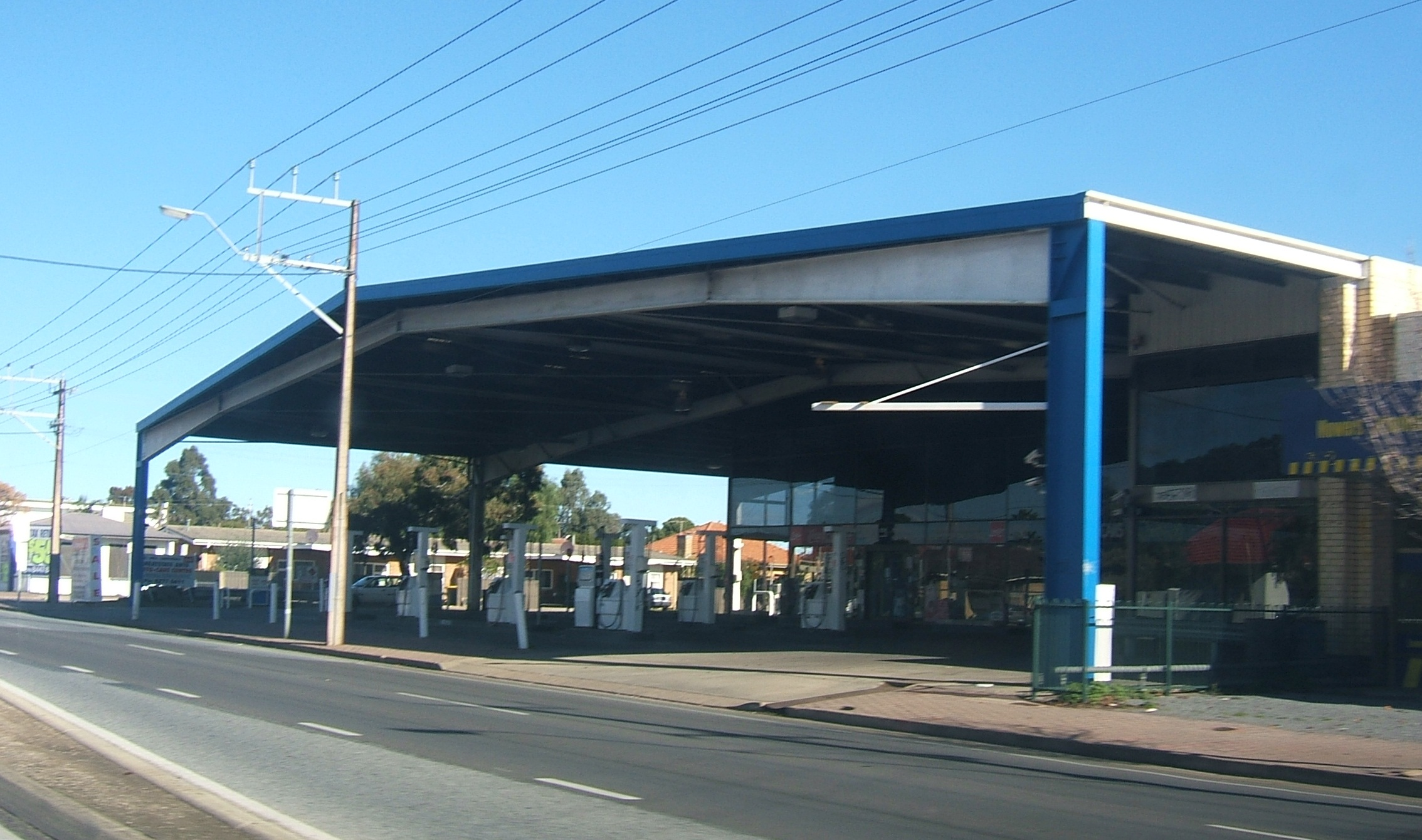
Mick Skarpos' once well-known (now out of business) discount petrol station

== See also ==
- List of Adelaide suburbs
