= Ascot Park, South Australia =

Ascot Park
- Suburb
- Coordinates: 34.988°S 138.559°E
- Country: Australia
- State: South Australia
- City: Adelaide
- LGA: City of Marion

Government
  - State electorates: Badcoe; Elder
  - Federal division: Boothby

Population
  - Total: 3,588 (SAL 2021)
- Postcode: 5043
Suburbs around Ascot Park
Plympton Park	South Plympton	Edwardstown
Park Holme	Ascot Park	Edwardstown
Marion	Mitchell Park	Clovelly Park

Ascot Park is a suburb in the south-western part of Adelaide in the City of Marion. It was named after Ascot Racecourse in England.

Ascot Park is bordered in the west by Marion Road, to the north by Wood Street, in the east by Robert Street and West Street and to the south by the southernmost of Daws Road and the Seaford railway line. It is adjacent to Park Holme, Edwardstown, South Plympton and Mitchell Park.

== Transport ==
The Seaford railway line stops at Ascot Park railway station and both the Seaford and Tonsley train line stops at Woodlands Park railway station, and the bus route M44 runs from Golden Grove in the north-eastern suburbs through the city centre, through Ascot Park and its adjoining suburbs to Westfield Marion.

== Reserves ==
There are three reserves in Ascot Park. First Avenue Reserve is located in the middle of First Avenue which contains a playground facility, a barbecue and an open, grassed area. Another reserve is between Sixth Avenue and Allison Street. This area contains a playground, a shelter with a table and a grassed area. This reserve is also fenced off so is suitable for dogs to be unleashed. A third reserve is located at the corner of Charles Street and Albert Street, on the eastern side of the Flinders railway line.

== Facilities ==
There are no schools located in the suburb but the school named for it, Ascot Park Primary School, is located on the western side of Marion Road in the neighbouring suburb of Park Holme. Similarly, the nearest kindergarten is the Ascot Park Kindergarten, also located on the western side of Marion Road in Park Holme.

The suburb contains two churches, on Fifth Avenue and on Wolseley Terrace; and the Ascot Park Scout Group is located on Sixth Avenue.

Ascot Park also contains a minor shopping centre that consists of a supermarket, chemist and two take-away shops on the eastern side Marion Road.

Ascot Park Post Office opened on 1 June 1918 but was renamed Park Holme North in 1966 before closing in 1985.

== See also ==
- List of Adelaide suburbs
- Electoral district of Ascot Park
