= Forbes Primary School =

Public school in South Australia

Location
- South Plympton, South Australia; Australia; 34.9777°S 138.5582°E

Information
- Type: Public school
- Motto: Never less than your best.
- Established: 1952
- Principal: Maureen Davidson
- Enrolment: 210 (2023)
- Colours: Maroon and white
- Website: https://forbesps.sa.edu.au

Forbes Primary School is a public coeducational primary school located in the Adelaide suburb of South Plympton, South Australia. It is administered by the South Australian Department of Education, with an enrolment of 210 students and a teaching staff of 21, as of 2023. The school caters to students from Reception to Year 6.

== History ==
The school opened on Friday, 17 October 1952 with a puppet show being the main event. After the school's opening an auction took place to raise funds for school supplies. A windmill was one of the over 200 items sold at the auction.

A fire at the school occurred in 1960, destroying seventeen classrooms.

In 2017, three children broke into the school and caused significant damage, which included paint being splatted over the walls, floors, and electrical equipment.

== Demographics ==
In 2023, the school had a student enrollment of 210 with 21 teachers (17.8 full-time equivalent) and 17 non-teaching staff (11.7 full-time equivalent). Female enrollments consisted of 95 students and Male enrollments consisted of 115 students; Indigenous enrollments accounted for a total of 15% and 40% of students had a language background other than English.

== Notable alumni ==
- Philip Tyler, politician

== See also ==
- List of schools in South Australia
