= Marion Road =

Road in Adelaide, Australia

Marion Road South Australia
- Coordinates: 34.924615°S 138.551917°E (North end); 35.025867°S 138.559519°E (South end)

General information
- Type: Road
- Location: Adelaide
- Length: 11.3 km (7.0 mi)
- Route number(s): A14 (1998–present)

Major junctions
- North end: Henley Beach Road; Underdale, Adelaide
- Sir Donald Bradman Drive; Anzac Highway; Cross Road; Southern Expressway
- South end: South Road; Bedford Park, Adelaide

Location(s)
- Region: Western Adelaide, Southern Adelaide
- Major suburbs: Brooklyn Park, Richmond, Plympton, Park Holme, Marion

Marion Road is a north–south arterial road through the western suburbs of Adelaide, South Australia, named after its traversal through the suburb of Marion and the local government area of City of Marion. It is designated part of route A14.

== Route ==
Where it terminates in Bedford Park, southwest of Adelaide's centre, Marion Road feeds into the Southern Expressway near the northern starting point of that road.

At its northern end, Marion Road terminates at Henley Beach Road. Route A14 continues west on Henley Beach Road for about 250 metres. It then travels north along the entire length of Holbrooks Road. At Grange Road it take a 50-metre dog leg to the east. It then continues north along the entire length of East Avenue until it ends at Port Road.

The Glenelg tram line has a level crossing in Plympton between Anzac Highway and Cross Road. The crossing in close proximity to two major intersections sometimes causes congestion during peak times, and has been the subject of political attention to convert the intersection with the tram line into an overpass. In April 2023, it was announced that the crossings would be grade separated, with work carried out in the second half of 2025 to build a tram overpass. Just south of the intersection of Oaklands and Daws Road, the Seaford railway line has an overpass over Marion Road.

== Major intersections ==
LGA	Location	km	mi	Destinations	Notes
West Torrens	Underdale–Torrensville–Brooklyn Park tripoint	0.0	0.0	Henley Beach Road (A14 west, unallocated east) – Henley Beach, Fulham, Mile End	Northern terminus of road, route A14 heads west along Henley Beach Road
West Torrens	Brooklyn Park–Cowandilla boundary	0.9	0.56	Sir Donald Bradman Drive (A6) – West Beach, Adelaide CBD, Adelaide Airport	
West Torrens	West Richmond–Richmond–Netley–Marleston quadripoint	2.0	1.2	Richmond Road – Keswick, to Greenhill Road (R1) – Wayville, Eastwood	
West Torrens	Plympton	4.4	2.7	Anzac Highway (A5) – Glenelg, Adelaide CBD	
West Torrens–Marion boundary	Plympton–Plympton Park–South Plympton tripoint	4.7	2.9	Glenelg tram line	
Marion	Plympton Park–South Plympton boundary	4.8	3.0	Cross Road (A3) – Unley Park, Glen Osmond	
Marion	Ascot Park–Park Holme boundary	7.7	4.8	Oaklands Road (west) – Somerton Park; Daws Road (east) – Daw Park	
Marion	Ascot Park–Mitchell Park–Marion tripoint	7.9	4.9	Seaford railway line	
Sturt River		9.4	5.8	Bridge over the river (bridge name unknown)	
Marion	Marion–Mitchell Park–Sturt–Bedford Park quadripoint	10.3	6.4	Sturt Road – Brighton, Tonsley	
Marion	Sturt–Bedford Park boundary	11.1	6.9	Southern Expressway (M2) – Reynella, Old Noarlunga	
Marion–Onkaparinga boundary	Sturt–Bedford Park–Darlington tripoint	11.3	7.0	Main South Road (A13 north-east, south-west) – St Marys, Old Reynella; Flagstaff Road (south) – Adelaide, Noarlunga, Happy Valley	Southern terminus of road and route A14
1.000 mi = 1.609 km; 1.000 km = 0.621 mi: Route transition

== Tram stop ==
Marion Road is also the location of a stop on the Glenelg tram line.

Preceding station	Adelaide Metro	Following station
South Plympton towards Royal Adelaide Hospital, Adelaide Entertainment Centre or Festival Plaza	Glenelg tram line	Plympton Park towards Moseley Square
