= Electoral district of Hurtle Vale =

South Australian state electoral district

Hurtle Vale South Australia—House of Assembly
- Interactive map of electoral district boundaries
- State: South Australia
- Created: 2018
- MP: Nat Cook
- Party: Labor
- Namesake: Sir James Hurtle Fisher
- Electors: 26,093 (2018)
- Area: 20.61 km^{2} (8.0 sq mi)
- Demographic: Metropolitan
- Coordinates: 35.1°S 138.55°E
Electorates around Hurtle Vale:
Black	Black	Davenport
Reynell	Hurtle Vale	Davenport
Reynell Kaurna	Heysen Kaurna	Heysen

Footnotes
- Electoral District map

Hurtle Vale is a single-member electoral district for the South Australian House of Assembly, located in the southern suburbs of Adelaide. It was created by the redistribution conducted in 2016, and was contested for the first time at the 2018 state election.

At its creation, Hurtle Vale contained the suburbs of Old Reynella, Reynella East, Woodcroft as well as part of Happy Valley and Morphett Vale.

== History ==
Hurtle Vale is a new electorate replacing the electoral district of Fisher. It is named after Sir James Hurtle Fisher, the same as its predecessor. Hurtle Vale is further southwest than Fisher was before the redistribution, with overlap only in the northeast of Hurtle Vale with the southwest of Fisher. At the time of the redistribution, 9000 electors from Fisher remained in Hurtle Vale. 10,000 moved with the suburb of Morphett Vale from Reynell and smaller numbers from Mawson and Mitchell.

At its creation, Hurtle Vale was projected to be notionally held by the Labor Party with a swing of 1.7% required to lose it. Nat Cook, who won Fisher at a by-election in 2014 for Labor, won Hurtle Vale at the 2018 election.

== Members for Hurtle Vale ==
Member	Party	Term
Nat Cook	Labor	2018–present

== Election results ==
2026 South Australian state election: Hurtle Vale
Party	Candidate	Votes	%	±%
Labor	Nat Cook	11,245	45.0	−8.8
One Nation	Katrina Emmerson	6,700	26.8	+26.8
Liberal	Charlotte Grundy	2,531	10.1	−16.5
Greens	Tammy Scott	2,407	9.6	+1.4
Family First	Sarah Kopeikin	851	3.4	−1.1
Legalise Cannabis	Jane Savage	683	2.7	+2.7
Animal Justice	Jannah Fahiz	355	1.4	+1.4
Australian Family	Michael Mitchard	199	0.8	−2.0
Total formal votes		24,971	96.4	+0.7
Informal votes		943	3.6	−0.7
Turnout		25,914	88.1	−1.0
Two-party-preferred result
Labor	Nat Cook	15,181	60.8	−4.7
One Nation	Katrina Emmerson	9,790	39.2	+39.2
Labor hold				
