= Electoral district of Fisher =

Former state electoral district of South Australia

Fisher South Australia—House of Assembly
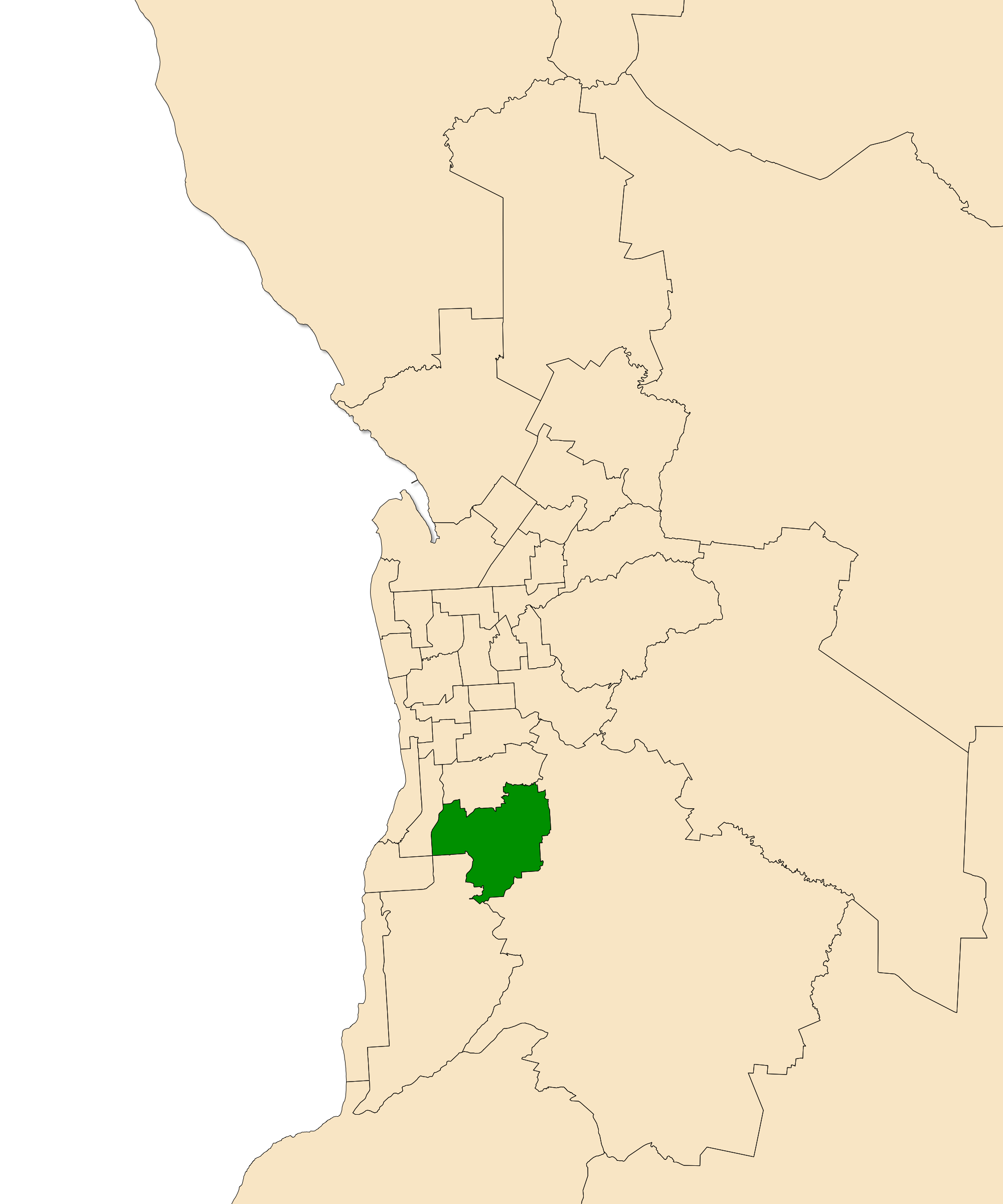
- Electoral district of Fisher (green) in the Greater Adelaide area
- State: South Australia
- Created: 1970
- Abolished: 2018
- Namesake: James Hurtle Fisher
- Electors: 25,829 (2014)
- Area: 94.2 km^{2} (36.4 sq mi)
- Demographic: Metropolitan
- Coordinates: 35°5′31″S 138°36′57″E

Fisher was an electoral district of the House of Assembly in the Australian state of South Australia. It was created in 1970 and named after Sir James Fisher, a colonial politician and the first mayor of Adelaide. It was abolished in a 2016 redistribution and its last MP, Nat Cook was elected to represent its replacement, Hurtle Vale, at the 2018 state election. It covers a 94.2 km^{2} suburban and semi rural area on the southern fringes of Adelaide, taking in the suburbs of Aberfoyle Park, Chandlers Hill, Cherry Gardens, Coromandel East, Happy Valley, Reynella East and parts of Clarendon, O'Halloran Hill and Woodcroft.

Before the 1983 electoral redistribution, Fisher took in the Blackwood area and was a safe Liberal seat, held by Stan Evans. The redistribution turned it into a marginal "mortgage belt" seat on a notional Liberal 2.1 percent two-party margin. With the bulk of his base shifted to the neighbouring seat of Davenport, Evans chose to challenge Dean Brown for Liberal preselection in Davenport. Evans lost in a bruising factional battle but chose to stand as an independent and was elected. With no sitting member at the 1985 election, Fisher was won by Philip Tyler and became Labor's second-most marginal seat. The seat returned to the Liberal Party in 1989 when Bob Such won the seat, which he held for the following 25 years. Such substantially increased his margin at the 1993 election landslide.

Changes in demographics during the 1990s made Fisher a marginal to fairly safe Liberal seat, but the Liberals lost control of the seat when Such resigned from the party to sit as an independent MP from October 2000. Such successfully retained his seat with an increased margin at the 2002 election and served as Speaker of the South Australian House of Assembly from 2005 to 2006 in the Mike Rann Labor government. He subsequently retained his seat with another margin increase to 16.7 percent at the 2006 election, despite early reports that the seat may fall to either the Labor or Liberal parties. The outcome of the 2006 election saw Such face former President of Australian Young Labor Amanda Rishworth on the two-candidate vote as opposed to a Liberal candidate in 2002, and Labor finished ahead of the Liberals on a 59.4 percent two-party vote from a 15.1 percent two-party swing, marking the first time since the 1985 election that Labor won the two-party vote in Fisher. Rishworth went on to win the federal seat of Kingston at the 2007 election, which takes in suburbs to the south west of Fisher. At the 2010 election, Such was re-elected with a virtually unchanged margin of 17.4% (again facing a Liberal candidate on the two-candidate vote), which fell to 9.4% at the 2014 election.

Such was diagnosed with a brain tumour a week after the 2014 election and died on 11 October. A 2014 Fisher by-election occurred on 6 December. Labor's Nat Cook won the by-election by nine votes from a 7.3 percent two-party swing, giving Labor a majority by one seat. On a margin of 0.02% margin, Fisher became the most marginal seat in parliament. Fisher was abolished as an electoral district as part of the mandatory redistribution following the 2014 state election. The South Australian Electoral Districts Boundaries Commission has designated the new seat of Hurtle Vale as its successor, with the new boundaries coming into effect from the 2018 state election. The name was chosen to retain the connection with Sir James Fisher as Hurtle was his middle name. Only the areas bounded by Reynella East, Woodcroft, and Happy Valley, however, were moved into the new seat, which actually takes in much more of the old district of Reynell. Suburbs including Cherry Gardens, Chandlers Hill, Aberfoyle Park, and parts of Happy Valley were moved into the re-drawn Davenport. The majority of Davenport electors from the 2014 boundaries were moved into Waite, which also gained the parts of Fisher east of Coromandel Valley. The southern parts of Fisher centred around Clarendon were moved to into Heysen. The sitting member chose to contest the 2018 election as a candidate in Hurtle Vale.

== Members for Fisher ==
Member	Party	Term
Stan Evans	Liberal and Country	1970–1974
Stan Evans	Liberal	1974–1985
Philip Tyler	Labor	1985–1989
Bob Such	Liberal	1989–2000
Bob Such	Independent Liberal	2000–2014
Nat Cook	Labor	2014–2018

== Election results ==
2014 Fisher state by-election
Party	Candidate	Votes	%	±%
Liberal	Heidi Harris	7,413	36.1	+1.0
Labor	Nat Cook	5,495	26.7	+9.0
Independent Continue Such's Legacy	Dan Woodyatt	4,789	23.3	+23.3
Independent Honest True Local	Dan Golding	880	4.3	+4.3
Independent Leading the Community	Rob de Jonge	809	3.9	+3.9
Greens	Malwina Wyra	708	3.4	−1.3
Stop Population Growth Now	Bob Couch	270	1.3	+1.3
Independent Democrat	Jeanie Walker	195	0.9	+0.9
Total formal votes		20,559	96.1	−1.5
Informal votes		841	3.9	+1.5
Turnout		21,400	82.9	−10.5
Two-party-preferred result
Labor	Nat Cook	10,284	50.02	+7.27
Liberal	Heidi Harris	10,275	49.98	−7.27
Labor gain from Independent		Swing	+7.27	
