= Stan Evans =

South Australian politician (1930–2025)

Stan Evans OAM

Father of the Parliament of South Australia
- In office 1988–1993
- Preceded by: Murray Hill
- Succeeded by: Graham Gunn

Member of the South Australian Parliament for Davenport
- In office 1985–1993
- Preceded by: Dean Brown
- Succeeded by: Iain Evans
- Majority: 10.2%

Member of the South Australian Parliament for Fisher
- In office 1970–1985
- Preceded by: New district
- Succeeded by: Philip Tyler
- Majority: 11.8%

Member of the South Australian Parliament for Onkaparinga
- In office 1968–1970
- Preceded by: Howard Shannon
- Succeeded by: District abolished
- Majority: 16.9%

Personal details
- Born: Stanley George Evans; 14 July 1930 Adelaide, South Australia, Australia
- Died: 29 November 2025 (aged 95) Adelaide, South Australia, Australia
- Party: Liberal Party of Australia
- Spouse: Barbara Evans OAM
- Children: 4 including Iain Evans
- Occupation: Politician

Stanley George Evans OAM (14 July 1930 – 29 November 2025) was a South Australian Liberal and Country League and Liberal politician, representing Onkaparinga from 1968 to 1970, Fisher from 1970 to 1985 and Davenport from 1985 to 1993.

== Parliament ==
A 1983 electoral redistribution significantly altered Fisher, cutting Evans' majority from a safe 9.2 percent to a marginal 2.1 percent. Most of the strongly Liberal areas of the old Fisher were transferred to the safe Liberal seat of Davenport, prompting Evans to challenge fellow Liberal Dean Brown for preselection in Davenport. The ensuing preselection contest turned into a factional battle; Evans was from the conservative wing of the Liberal Party while Brown was from the moderate wing. Evans lost preselection for the 1985 election to Brown, but stood as an Independent Liberal and defeated him.

Evans nevertheless maintained his Liberal Party membership, because at that time the Liberals did not have a policy of expelling members who opposed endorsed candidates.

He rejoined the Liberal partyroom shortly after the election, and stood in the 1989 election as the endorsed Liberal candidate for Davenport. He retired at the 1993 election.

At age 88, Evans stood for local government election in the Ranges Ward of the Adelaide Hills Council in 2018, but was not one of the seven successful candidates from a field of 13.

== Personal life and death ==
Evans was married to Barbara Eva ‘Barb’ Evans from 1951 until both of their deaths in late 2025. They were married for 74 years. His son Iain Evans succeeded him as the member for Davenport, and held the seat from 1993 to 2014. Iain was also the state Liberal leader and Leader of the Opposition from 2006 to 2007.

Evans died on 29 November 2025, at the age of 95.

== Honours and awards ==
- 2000 – Australian Sports Medal

"Outstanding contribution and support to cricket-tennis-Aussie Rules. 45 years administration"

- 2001 – Centenary Medal

"For service to Australian society through parliament"

- 2019 – Medal of the Order of Australia (OAM)

"For service to the Parliament of South Australia"

Parliament of South Australia
Preceded by Murray Hill	Father of the Parliament of South Australia; 1988–1993	Succeeded by Graham Gunn
South Australian House of Assembly
Preceded by Howard Shannon	Member for Onkaparinga; 1968–1970	District abolished
New district	Member for Fisher; 1970–1985	Succeeded by Philip Tyler
Preceded by Dean Brown	Member for Davenport; 1985–1993	Succeeded by Iain Evans
