= Bob Such =

Australian politician

The Honourable Doctor Bob Such
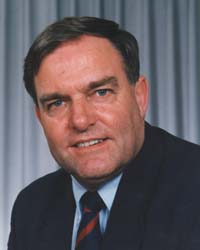

Speaker of the South Australian House of Assembly
- In office 4 April 2005 – 26 March 2006
- Preceded by: Peter Lewis
- Succeeded by: Jack Snelling

Member of the House of Assembly for Fisher
- In office 25 November 1989 – 11 October 2014
- Preceded by: Philip Tyler
- Succeeded by: Nat Cook

Personal details
- Born: Robert Bruce Such; 22 June 1944 Hawthorndene, South Australia
- Died: 11 October 2014 (aged 70) Daw Park, South Australia
- Party: Independent Liberal (2000–2014)
- Other political affiliations: Liberal Party (1989–2000)
- Education: Flinders University
- Occupation: Teacher

Robert Bruce Such (2 June 1944 – 11 October 2014) was a South Australian politician. He was the member for the seat of Fisher in the South Australian House of Assembly from 1989 until his death in 2014. He defeated Labor MP Philip Tyler at the 1989 election and was a member of the Liberals until 2000 when he became an independent. Such was Minister for Employment, Training and Further Education, and Minister for Youth Affairs, in the Brown Liberal government from 1993 to 1996. He served as Speaker of the South Australian House of Assembly for the Rann Labor government from 2005 to 2006. Such was joint Father of the House with Michael Atkinson from 2012.

== Early life ==
Such grew up in Hawthorndene, South Australia and attended Coromandel Valley Primary School and Goodwood Boys Technical High School. His first job at the age of 14 was working on a farm at Alford on South Australia's Yorke Peninsula. He gained a Bachelor of Arts (Hons) in Economics and Politics and a PhD in Environmental Politics from Flinders University. He also gained a Diploma of Teaching from what is now the University of South Australia and a Diploma of Education from the University of Adelaide. He also completed part of a law degree.

Before entering politics, Such was a teacher/lecturer and researcher in the fields of politics, economics and the environment, at what is now the University of South Australia. Before and during the early stages of his role in Parliament, Such was also a councillor for the City of Mitcham.

== Political career ==
=== Liberal Party (1989–2000) ===
Such was first elected as a Liberal MP for the seat of Fisher at the 1989 election, defeating Labor MP Philip Tyler with a 3.1 percent two-party margin from a 4.2 percent two-party swing, and went on to increase his margins. During his time with the Liberal Party, he took on several high-profile portfolios. He was the Shadow Minister for Further Education, Employment and Youth Affairs (May 1992 – December 1993) and when the Liberal Party won the 1993 election landslide, he became the Minister for Employment, Training and Further Education and the Minister for Youth Affairs (December 1993 – December 1996). In 1996, the Premier of South Australia Dean Brown was deposed by John Olsen in a coup. In Olsen's ministerial reshuffle, Such was moved to the backbench. Former Liberal leader Iain Evans would later label the threat to Such's preselection as a "mistake" and his demotion to the backbench as "stupid politics".

In 2000, Such began to voice discontent with the Liberal Government, notably the contrast between its 'obsession with money' and spending on dubious projects. It was claimed that Such allowed his involvement in his local Liberal branch to wane, increasing the possibility of a challenge to his Liberal preselection. When former Kingston Liberal federal MP Susan Jeanes announced her intention to contest Liberal preselection in Fisher, Such quit the Liberal Party, claiming he was disgruntled with the lack of support from his Liberal parliamentary colleagues.

=== Independent (2000–2014) ===
Such retained Fisher as an independent in the 2002 election with a primary vote of 33.5 percent and a final two-candidate-preferred vote of 62.1 percent over Jeanes after receiving Labor preferences. The Liberals had placed Such in fifth place on the ticket, behind the Labor candidate. After the election, Labor was one short of a majority with the Liberals three short of a majority, with three elected independent MPs and a Nationals SA MP holding the balance of power on the crossbench. The Kerin government ended when Parliament resumed in March 2002, with Peter Lewis choosing to support a Labor government.

==== Speaker ====
Such was elected to the position of Deputy Speaker and Chair of Committees in February 2002. Although he had not voted to put the Rann Labor government in office, during 2002–06 the Rann government cultivated the support of all the crossbench. Such was often described as a "small-l" liberal independent. Such became Speaker of the South Australian House of Assembly in a Labor government from 2005 to 2006 after Peter Lewis resigned as Speaker.

==== Committees ====
Such was a member of many parliamentary committees, including the Environment, Resources and Development Committee, Social Development Committee, and the Economic and Finance Committee. He was a member of numerous community and school groups, several of which focused on the environment, including the Nature Conservation Society of SA Inc., the Nature Foundation SA, and the Parklands Preservation Society.

==== 2006 and 2010 elections ====
The 2006 election landslide saw Such face a Labor rather than Liberal candidate on the two-candidate-preferred vote. Such received a primary vote of 45.2 percent, an increase of 11.7 points. His primary vote was 18.8 points more than Labor, and 26.7 points more than the Liberals, holding the seat with a margin of 16.7 points. The outcome of the election saw Such face former President of Australian Young Labor Amanda Rishworth on the two-candidate vote as opposed to a Liberal candidate in 2002, and Labor finished ahead of the Liberals on a 59.4 percent two-party vote from a 15.1 percent two-party swing, marking the first time since the 1985 election that Labor won the two-party vote in Fisher.

His margin remained virtually unchanged at the 2010 election, on 16.6 points.

==== 2014 election ====
Such retained Fisher at the 2014 election on a significantly decreased 9.4 percent margin. The 2014 election resulted in a hung parliament with 23 Labor seats, 22 Liberal seats, and two independents. These two independents, Such and Geoff Brock, held the balance of power. Such had not indicated whom he would support in a minority government when, a week after the election, he was diagnosed with a brain tumour. He subsequently took medical leave and was hospitalised.

University of Adelaide Professor and Political Commentator Clem McIntyre said the absence of Such virtually guaranteed that Brock would back Labor – with 24 seats required to govern, Brock duly provided support to the incumbent Labor government, allowing Premier Jay Weatherill to continue in office as head of a minority government. McIntyre said:

If Geoff Brock had gone with the Liberals, then the Parliament would have effectively been tied 23 to 23, so once Bob Such became ill and stepped away then Geoff Brock, I think had no choice but to side with Labor.

The Liberals were reduced to 21 seats in May 2014 when Martin Hamilton-Smith became an independent and entered cabinet with Brock.

== Death and by-election ==
Such was diagnosed with a brain tumour one week after the 2014 election. He immediately took medical leave and was hospitalised. Although Such ended up on indefinite medical leave, he did attend the opening day of parliament. Such died at the Daw House Hospice on 11 October 2014. and was survived by his (second) wife, Lyn.

The 2014 Fisher by-election was held on 6 December, with Labor's Nat Cook winning the seat by just nine votes from a 7.3 percent two-party swing, taking Labor from minority to majority government. Despite this, the Weatherill Labor government kept Brock and Hamilton-Smith in cabinet, giving the government a 26 to 21 parliamentary majority.

Parliament of South Australia
| Preceded by Philip Tyler | Member for Fisher; 1989–2014 | Succeeded by Nat Cook |
| Preceded by Peter Lewis | Speaker of the South Australian House of Assembly; 2005–2006 | Succeeded by Jack Snelling |
