= Railway electrification in Australia =

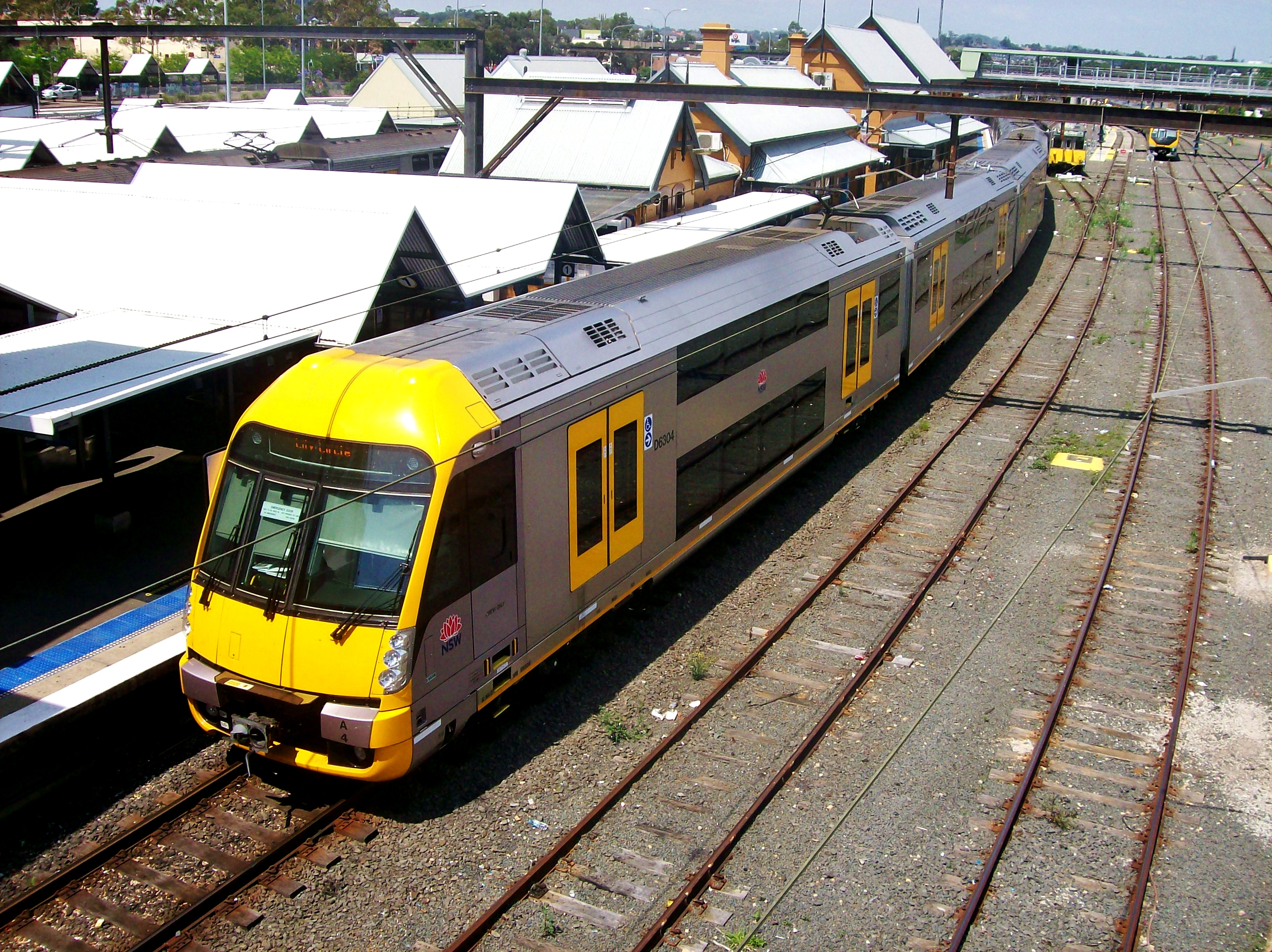
A Sydney Trains A set below catenary lines at Campbelltown station

Electrification of Australian railways began with the Melbourne and Sydney suburban lines. Melbourne suburban lines were electrified from 1919 using 1,500 V DC. Sydney suburban lines were electrified from 1926 using the same system.

Later Australian systems used 25 kV 50 Hz AC electrification, which had been introduced in the 1950s in France, and by the 1980s become the international standard. Hence they differed from earlier systems, although as each suburban system is centred on the main city and are not interconnected, this would not cause problems. Later suburban systems were Brisbane from 1979, Perth from 1992 and Adelaide from 2014. There has also been extensive non-urban electrification in Queensland using 25 kV 50 Hz AC, mainly during the 1980s for coal routes.

== Electrification systems ==
Electrification of the Melbourne suburban rail network was considered as far back as 1896, and again in 1903 and 1907. In 1908, British engineer Charles Merz, of Merz and McLellan, recommended the use of a 200 km (124 mi) system to electrify the St Kilda, Port Melbourne, Sandringham and Broadmeadows lines, using 800 V DC from a third rail. However, his later 1912 report recommended using 1,500 V DC delivered by overhead catenaries although, at the time, that system was not used anywhere in the world. The proposal was approved, and Merz's firm was appointed to supervise the work. The AC line voltage was converted to DC using rotary converters placed at strategic locations along the lines. In the 1920s, mercury arc rectifiers began to be used instead.

Electrification of the Sydney network had been recommended by a royal commission in 1909 and, in his 1915 plan, engineer John Bradfield recommended using 1,500 V DC. In 1922, that was supported by a conference of the state railway commissioners, who were anxious to avoid a repeat of use of different track gauges in the various states. By that time, the 1,500 V DC system was in use on railways in England, the Netherlands, France and the US. The same system was also recommended for the Brisbane suburban system in 1947-1950, although that proposal was abandoned in 1959.

In the 1950s, with the standardisation of Australian power generation at a frequency of 50 Hz, the Melbourne substations were converted to 50 Hz within the life of the 25 Hz Newport Power Station, which had been opened in 1918 to supply power for the Melbourne rail electrification. Sydney substations were converted between 1960 and 1963.

== New South Wales ==
Rail electrification in Sydney commenced in 1926 (see Sydney electrification). From 1956, regional lines, to a radius of approximately 160 km (99 mi) around Sydney, were progressively electrified. The entire Sydney metropolitan area, and the intercity lines to Kiama (south), Lithgow (west) and Newcastle (north) are electrified, and services are provided by EMU trainsets. Although NSW did use electric locomotives from the 1950s onwards, this practice has largely ceased since privatisation of rail freight transportation.

The heavy rail lines are powered by 1,500 V DC, while the light rail lines use 750 V DC. The former Sydney tram system used 600 V DC. The defunct single-loop Sydney Monorail, which operated between 1988 and 2013, used 500 V AC, provided by a third rail.

== Queensland ==
Queensland has the most extensive electrification in Australia. It includes the entire Brisbane metropolitan area, the North Coast Line to Rockhampton and the central Queensland coalfields.

Electrification for the heavy rail lines is at 25 kV 50 Hz AC, while the G:link is at 750 V DC, the Sea World Monorail System was at 500 V AC via third rail, and the previous Brisbane tram network was at 600 V DC via overhead wire.

== South Australia ==
Rail electrification in South Australia did not become a reality until the 21st century. Plans were announced in 2008 to have all four suburban lines electrified by 2018, but were delayed and later scrapped. The Seaford and Tonsley lines were the first to be electrified with services commencing in 2014, while original plans to electrify the Gawler line first were delayed in various forms until partial electrification was finalised, which began construction in late 2018 and, following significant delays and a full 18-month shut-down of the line, was completed along the entire line in June 2022 with the first service running on 12 June 2022

Electrification for the heavy rail lines is at 25 kV 50 Hz AC, while that for the tram routes is at 600 V DC.

== Victoria ==
Australia's first rail electrification was opened in Melbourne in 1919. Electrification is limited to the Melbourne metropolitan area. Previous electrification to Traralgon (opened 1956) was removed in 1987. Electrification was subsequently truncated to Pakenham in Melbourne south east.

Electrification for the heavy rail lines is at 1,500 V DC, while that for the tram lines is at 600 V DC.

== Western Australia ==
The first line in Perth was electrified in 1991—see Transperth Train Operations.

Electrification is at 25 kV 50 Hz AC.

The defunct tram network in Perth was electrified at 600 V DC

== Australian Capital Territory ==
Canberra currently only has one electrified light railway, opening in 2019 with 12 kilometres (7.5 mi) of track with traction from a 750V DC sourced from an overhead catenary. The ACT never previously had electrified rail.

== See also ==
- Rail transport in Australia
