= 2014 Fisher state by-election =

South Australian by-election

- 6 December 2014
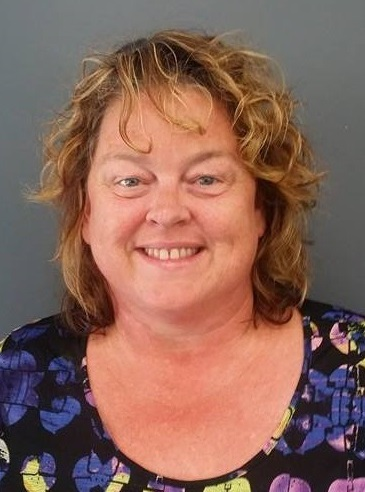

| | First party | Second party | Third party |
|---|---|---|---|
| | | | IND |
| Candidate | Nat Cook | Heidi Harris | Dan Woodyatt |
| Party | Labor | Liberal | Independent |
| Popular vote | 5,495 | 7,413 | 4,789 |
| Percentage | 26.7% | 36.1% | 23.3% |
| Swing | ▲9.0 | ▲1.0 | ▲23.3 |
| TPP | 50.02% | 49.98% |
| TPP swing | ▲7.27 | ▼7.27 |
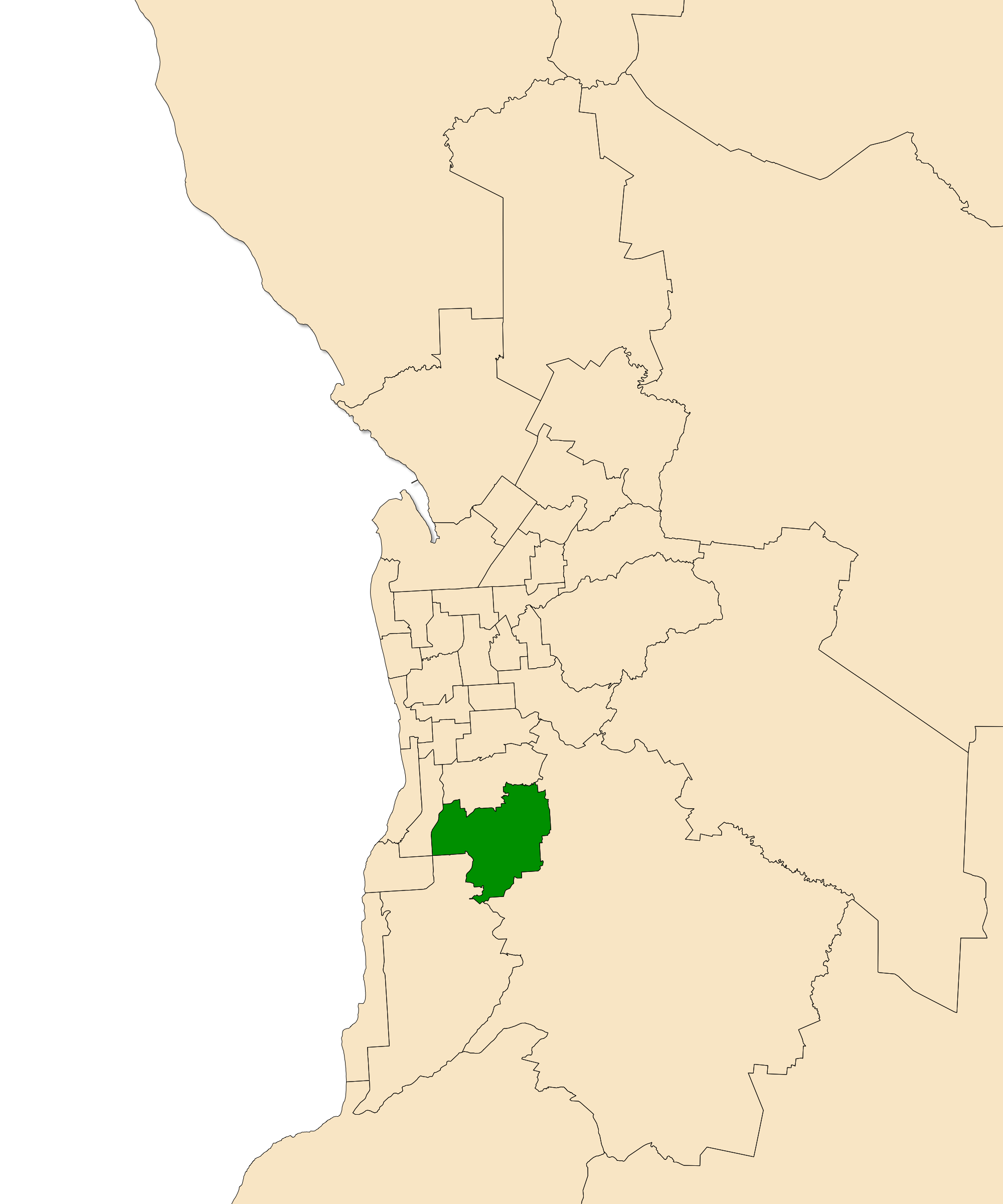
- Electoral district of Fisher in the southern metropolitan area of Adelaide.
MP before election
Bob Such
Independent
Elected MP
Nat Cook
Labor

A by-election for the seat of Fisher in the South Australian House of Assembly was held on 6 December 2014. The by-election was triggered by the death of independent MP Bob Such on 11 October 2014. Originally elected to Fisher for the Liberal Party of Australia at the 1989 election, defeating the one-term Australian Labor Party MP Philip Tyler, Such left the party in 2000.

Though the Liberals were favourites to win the traditionally Liberal seat, Labor's Nat Cook won the by-election by five votes, a 50.02 percent two-party-preferred vote from a 7.27-point swing away from the Liberals, resulting in a change from minority to majority government. Despite this, the Jay Weatherill Labor government kept crossbench MPs Geoff Brock and Martin Hamilton-Smith in cabinet, giving the government a 26 to 21 parliamentary majority.

ABC psephologist Antony Green described the by-election as a "very poor result for the Liberal Party in South Australia both state and federally", and that a fourth term government gaining a seat at a by-election was unprecedented in Australian history. Much of the anti-Liberal swing was attributed to the unpopularity of then Prime Minister Tony Abbott, and additionally, the remark from then Defence Minister David Johnston several days before the Fisher by-election, where he stated he wouldn't trust South Australia's Australian Submarine Corporation to "build a canoe".

== Dates ==
| Date | Event |
|---|---|
| 8 November 2014 | Writ of election issued by the Speaker |
| 18 November 2014 | Close of electoral rolls |
| 21 November 2014 | Close of nominations |
| 6 December 2014 | Polling day, between the hours of 8 am and 6 pm |

== Candidates ==
8 candidates in ballot paper order
| Liberal Party of Australia | Heidi Harris | Former Lord Melbourne Hotel manager and political adviser to Duncan McFetridge. Liberal candidate for Elder in 2002. |
| Independent Australian Democrats | Jeanie Walker | Property investing and management, Aboriginal Family Violence Case Manager. Australian Democrats, No Rodeo and independent candidate at prior elections. |
| Australian Labor Party | Nat Cook | Flinders Medical Centre worker. Founded the Sammy D Foundation after her son died from a one-punch king hit. |
| Independent Leading the Community | Rob de Jonge | Unsuccessfully sought Liberal preselection. City of Onkaparinga councillor for 8 years, recently defeated. Contested Davenport in 2010. |
| Stop Population Growth Now | Bob Couch | Accountant and other occupations. Upper house candidate at the previous election. |
| Independent Continue Such's Legacy | Dan Woodyatt | Government lawyer with a background in assisting with the implementation of large capital projects and community initiatives. Endorsed by Such's widow. |
| Greens | Malwina Wyra | Commerce and Environmental Management Flinders University student. Staffer to Tammy Franks. Candidate in Fisher at the previous election. |
| Independent Honest True Local | Dan Golding | Involved with Neighbourhood Watch, Scouts, Air Force Cadets, Youth Advisory Council and the SA Tall Ships Association. |

== Two-party-preferred history ==
The two-party-preferred vote in Fisher while Such was an independent:

| Election: | 2002 | 2006 | 2010 | 2014 |
| Liberal: | 55.7% | 40.6% | 51.9% | 57.2% |
| Labor: | 44.3% | 59.4% | 48.1% | 42.8% |

== Polling ==
One opinion poll was conducted and released by the in-house polling group at The Advertiser, Adelaide's main newspaper. Between one and two weeks prior to the by-election, 400 voters were polled in the seat. Voters were randomly selected at the sole pre-poll booth at Happy Valley Shopping Centre, as well as at Aberfoyle Hub. Primary votes saw 34.25 (−0.85) percent to Liberal, 30 percent to Woodyatt, 20.5 (+2.8) percent to Labor, with a collective 15 percent for the remaining five candidates. The Advertiser claimed that a Liberal primary vote below 40 percent and the high vote for Woodyatt with Labor remaining in third place, preferences could have seen Fisher retained by an independent, Woodyatt.

South Australian Newspoll at the time of the by-election recorded a statewide six percent two-party swing from Liberal to Labor.

== Result ==
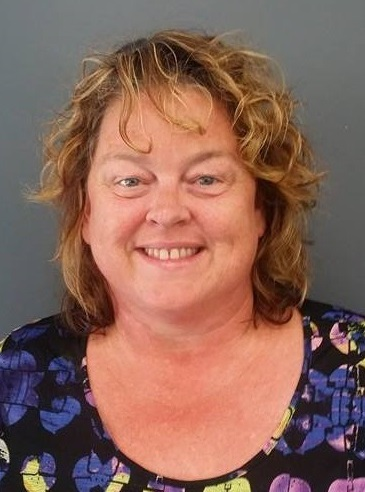
Labor candidate Nat Cook won the traditionally Liberal seat of Fisher by just nine votes after preferences from a 7.27 percent Liberal to Labor two-party swing, taking Labor from minority to majority government.

2014 Fisher state by-election
| Party | Candidate | Votes | % | ±% |
|---|---|---|---|---|
| Liberal | Heidi Harris | 7,413 | 36.1 | +1.0 |
| Labor | Nat Cook | 5,495 | 26.7 | +9.0 |
| Independent Continue Such's Legacy | Dan Woodyatt | 4,789 | 23.3 | +23.3 |
| Independent Honest True Local | Dan Golding | 880 | 4.3 | +4.3 |
| Independent Leading the Community | Rob de Jonge | 809 | 3.9 | +3.9 |
| Greens | Malwina Wyra | 708 | 3.4 | −1.3 |
| Stop Population Growth Now | Bob Couch | 270 | 1.3 | +1.3 |
| Independent Democrat | Jeanie Walker | 195 | 0.9 | +0.9 |
| Total formal votes | | 20,559 | 96.1 | −1.5 |
| Informal votes | | 841 | 3.9 | +1.5 |
| Turnout | | 21,400 | 82.9 | −10.5 |
Two-party-preferred result
| Labor | Nat Cook | 10,284 | 50.02 | +7.27 |
| Liberal | Heidi Harris | 10,275 | 49.98 | −7.27 |
| Labor gain from Independent | | Swing | +7.27 | |

Instant-runoff voting method.

Though the Liberals were favourites to win the traditionally Liberal seat, Labor's Nat Cook won the by-election by five votes with Woodyatt preferences, a 50.02 percent two-party-preferred vote from a 7.27 percent swing away from the Liberals, resulting in a change from minority to majority government. Despite this, the Jay Weatherill Labor government kept crossbench MPs Geoff Brock and Martin Hamilton-Smith in cabinet, giving the government a 26 to 21 parliamentary majority. The Liberals were successful in requesting a re-count which occurred on 15 December.

Labor achieved majority government at a state level one week prior at the 2014 Victorian election.

ABC psephologist Antony Green described the by-election as a "very poor result for the Liberal Party in South Australia both state and federally", and that a fourth term government gaining a seat at a by-election was unprecedented in Australian history. Much of the anti-Liberal swing was attributed to the unpopularity of then Prime Minister Tony Abbott, and additionally, the remark from then Defence Minister David Johnston several days before the by-election, where he stated he wouldn't trust South Australia's Australian Submarine Corporation to "build a canoe".

Former Liberal leader Iain Evans in Davenport resigned from parliament on 30 October 2014 which triggered a 2015 Davenport by-election for 31 January. Just a couple of days before the Davenport by-election, Abbott's infamous knighting of Prince Philip occurred. Liberal Sam Duluk won the seat despite a five percent two-party swing, turning the historically safe seat of Davenport in to a two-party marginal seat for the first time. ABC psephologist Antony Green described it as "another poor result for the South Australian Liberal Party".

== See also ==
- 2015 Davenport state by-election
- 2018 South Australian state election#Polling
- List of South Australian House of Assembly by-elections
