= Philip Tyler =

Australian politician

Philip Brian Tyler (born 22 February 1954) was a politician who represented the South Australian House of Assembly seat of Fisher for the Labor Party from 1985 to 1989.

== Early life ==
Tyler moved to South Australia in 1966 and attended both Forbes Primary School and Mitchell Park Boys Technical High School. After his schooling, he undertook a Horological Apprenticeship, which was completed in 1973. Tyler originally wanted to pursue a career in sports, however, politics became his main objective following a motorcycle accident in 1978 and he formally entered politics in 1979.

== Political career ==
He became a member of the Labor Party after the Whitlam Government was sacked in 1975, which began his political career, though he did not officially enter politics until 1979. From 1975 to 1982, he was a technician with the Adelaide City Council and between 1982 and 1985 he was the Ministerial Advisor to Gavin Keneally.

He was pre-selected for the seat of Fisher in 1983, being elected on 7 December 1985 and was defeated on 25 November 1989. His successor was Liberal candidate Bob Such.

South Australian House of Assembly
| Preceded by Stan Evans | Member for Fisher; 1985–1989 | Succeeded by Bob Such |
