= Nat Cook =

Australian politician

The Honourable Nat Cook MP
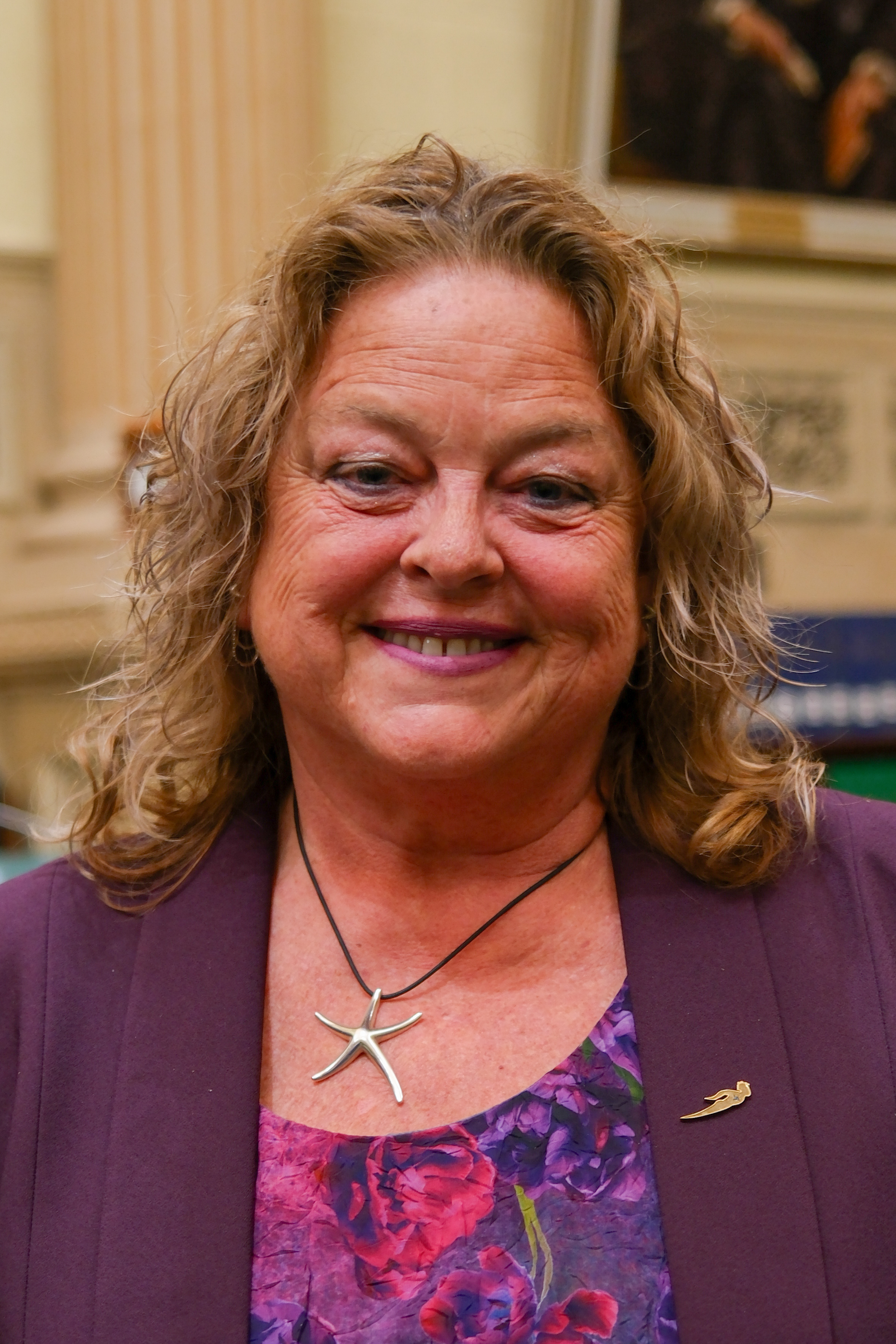
- Cook at Parliament House in 2026

39th Speaker of the South Australian House of Assembly
- Incumbent
- Assumed office 5 May 2026
- Preceded by: Leon Bignell

Minister for Seniors and Ageing Well
- In office 15 April 2024 – 25 March 2026
- Premier: Peter Malinauskas
- Preceded by: Zoe Bettison (2018)
- Succeeded by: Katrine Hildyard

Minister for Human Services
- In office 24 March 2022 – 25 March 2026
- Premier: Peter Malinauskas
- Preceded by: Michelle Lensink
- Succeeded by: Katrine Hildyard

Member of the South Australian House of Assembly for Hurtle Vale
- Incumbent
- Assumed office 17 March 2018
- Preceded by: New district

Member of the South Australian House of Assembly for Fisher
- In office 16 December 2014 – 17 March 2018
- Preceded by: Bob Such
- Succeeded by: District abolished

Personal details
- Born: Natalie Fleur Cook; 7 February 1969 (age 57) Adelaide, South Australia, Australia
- Party: Labor
- Other political affiliations: Independent (Speaker) (2026–present)
- Spouse: Neil Davis (m. 2003)
- Children: 4
- Education: Mitcham Girls High School
- Alma mater: Flinders University
- Profession: Nurse
- Website: www.natcook.com.au

Natalie Fleur Cook is an Australian politician and anti-violence campaigner. She is Speaker of the South Australian House of Assembly. She became an anti-violence campaigner after the death of her son in a one-punch attack in 2008. Cook was a member of the Labor before being made Speaker in on 25 March 2026.

She has represented Hurtle Vale since the 2018 state election. She previously represented Fisher after winning the 2014 by-election, vacated by the death of independent member Bob Such, until it was abolished in the 2018 election. Cook served as the Minister for Human Services from March 2022, and in March 2024 as Minister for Seniors and Ageing Well in the Malinauskas ministry , until being appointed Speaker.

Cook was previously the Parliamentary Secretary for Housing and Urban Development from September 2017 until Labor's loss at the 2018 election, after which she was the Shadow Minister for Human Services in the Malinauskas shadow ministry.

== Early life and education ==
Natalie Fleur Cook was born in Adelaide, South Australia, to first-generation English migrants, the youngest daughter of three children, and grew up in Morphett Vale, a southern Adelaide suburb.

Cook attended her local primary school, Flaxmill Primary School, and later went to Mitcham Girls High School.

== Pre-parliamentary career ==
Prior to being elected to the South Australian Parliament in 2014, Cook worked for nearly 30 years as a Registered Nurse, including as an After-Hours Hospital Coordinator, Retrieval, and Intensive-Care Nurse. Her training began at the Queen Elizabeth Hospital, where she joined the Australian Nursing and Midwifery Federation (ANMF). She states:

My nursing career really started as a volunteer with St John Cadets when I was 11. I had many role models in the St John's brigade who helped me to decide that nursing and working in health care was something that I needed to do, because I really cared for other people. I got enormous satisfaction out of volunteering every weekend, sometimes in multiple locations on any one day.

Cook is honoured to hold the title of Associate Professor with the School of Nursing and Midwifery University of South Australia.

== Anti-violence activism ==
In 2008 Cook's 17-year-old son Sam Davis was killed in a one-punch attack at a party. Soon after Cook and her partner, Neil Davis, founded the Sammy D Foundation, which runs school programs to spread an anti-violence message and provide positive role models to disadvantaged youth. Cook stood down from the board of the Sammy D Foundation after she was elected to Parliament.

== Political career ==
On 20 October 2014 Cook was pre-selected as the Labor Party candidate for the seat of Fisher in the 2014 Fisher by-election, following the death of incumbent member Bob Such. Cook won the by-election by nine votes from a 7.3 percent two-party swing, resulting in the Weatherill Labor Government changing from minority to majority government. On a 0.02 percent margin it was the most marginal seat in parliament.

A redistribution of electoral boundaries occurs following each South Australian general election and it was decided in 2016 that the electoral division of Fisher would be abolished. Its electors were divided between the seats of Davenport, Heysen, Hurtle Vale, and Waite, with Hurtle Vale designated as Fisher's successor by the South Australian Electoral Districts Boundaries Commission. Cook successfully contested the 2018 general election (when the new boundaries came into effect) in Hurtle Vale, becoming its first representative. Despite Labor losing government, Cook received a swing towards her of 3.6% in two-party preferred terms, taking 55.3% of the two-party preferred vote.

Following Labor's victory at the 2022 election, Cook was appointed as Minister for Human Services in the Malinauskas ministry. She was later appointed Minister for Seniors and Ageing Well.

On 5 May 2026, Cook was elected as Speaker of the South Australian House of Assembly. She had to leave the Labor Party and become independent in order to fulfil her role.

== Personal life ==
Cook gave birth to her first child Sam, in 1990. She also has a stepdaughter, Sheree, a foster son Ty, and a son Sid.

Cook married her longtime partner Neil Davis in 2003. As of 2025 they had lived in the same home in Woodcroft for nearly 30 years.

South Australian House of Assembly
Preceded by Bob Such	Member for Fisher; 2014–2018	Seat abolished
New seat	Member for Hurtle Vale; 2018–present	Incumbent
Political offices
Preceded by Michelle Lensink	Minister for Human Services; 2022–2026	Succeeded by Katrine Hildyard
New office	Minister for Seniors and Ageing Well; 2022–2026	Succeeded by Katrine Hildyard
