= South Plympton, South Australia =

South Plympton
- Suburb
- Country: Australia
- State: South Australia
- City: Adelaide
- LGA: City of Marion

Government
  - State electorate: Badcoe
  - Federal division: Boothby

Population
  - Total: 4,721 (SAL 2021)
- Postcode: 5038

South Plympton is a suburb of Adelaide in the City of Marion.

South Plympton is bound by the Glenelg tram line to the north, Marion Road to the west, and Wood Street to the south; and it has a slightly complicated eastern boundary which includes Towers Terrace and Winifred Avenue.

== History ==
The suburb was originally divided into smaller suburbs including Forbes, Harcourt Gardens and Vermont, which were amalgamated into South Plympton in 1947.

South Plympton Post Office opened on 5 January 1948. South Plympton's postcode is 5038, and the post office is located in the Forbes Shopping centre on Marion Road.

== Tram stop ==
South Plympton is also the location of a stop on the Glenelg tram line.

Preceding station	Adelaide Metro	Following station
Beckman Street towards Royal Adelaide Hospital, Adelaide Entertainment Centre or Festival Plaza	Glenelg tram line	Marion Road towards Moseley Square

== See also ==
- List of Adelaide suburbs
