= Electoral results for the district of Mawson =

South Australian district election results

This is a list of electoral results for the Electoral district of Mawson in South Australian state elections.

== Members for Mawson ==
Member	Party	Term
Don Hopgood	Labor	1970–1977
Leslie Drury	Labor	1977–1979
Ivar Schmidt	Liberal	1979–1982
Susan Lenehan	Labor	1982–1993
Robert Brokenshire	Liberal	1993–2006
Leon Bignell	Labor	2006–2026

== Election results ==
=== Elections in the 2020s ===
==== 2026 ====
2026 South Australian state election: Mawson
Party	Candidate	Votes	%	±%
Labor	Jenni Mitton	9,394	37.4	−13.8
One Nation	Tyler Green	6,554	26.1	+19.5
Liberal	Mike Holden	4,331	17.2	−10.8
Greens	Lawrence Johnson	3,220	12.8	+4.0
Legalise Cannabis	Lesley Gray	1,051	4.2	+4.2
Australian Family	Peter Ieraci	294	1.2	+0.0
Real Change	Kelly Schumacher	274	1.1	+1.1
Total formal votes		25,118	96.5	−0.5
Informal votes		905	3.5	+0.5
Turnout		26,023	88.9	−1.1
Two-candidate-preferred result
Labor	Jenni Mitton	14,224	56.6	−7.2
One Nation	Tyler Green	10,894	43.4	+43.4
Labor hold				

==== 2022 ====
2022 South Australian state election: Mawson
Party	Candidate	Votes	%	±%
Labor	Leon Bignell	12,288	51.2	+15.8
Liberal	Amy Williams	6,724	28.0	−6.6
Greens	Jason Garrood	2,126	8.9	+0.7
One Nation	Jennifer Game	1,574	6.6	+6.6
Animal Justice	Steve Campbell	574	2.4	+2.4
Family First	Lynton Barry	443	1.8	+1.8
Australian Family	Peter Ieraci	279	1.2	+1.2
Total formal votes		24,008	97.0	
Informal votes		745	3.0	
Turnout		24,753	90.0	
Two-party-preferred result
Labor	Leon Bignell	15,322	63.8	+13.1
Liberal	Amy Williams	8,686	36.2	−13.1
Labor hold		Swing	+13.1	

Distribution of preferences: Mawson
Party	Candidate	Votes	Round 1		Round 2		Round 3		Round 4		Round 5	
Party	Candidate	Votes	Dist.	Total	Dist.	Total	Dist.	Total	Dist.	Total	Dist.	Total
Quota (50% + 1)		12,005										
Labor	Leon Bignell	12,288	+19	12,307	+75	12,382	+185	12,567	+410	12,977	+2,345	15,322
Liberal	Amy Williams	6,724	+16	6,740	+119	6,859	+64	6,923	+837	7,760	+926	8,686
Greens	Jason Garrood	2,126	+25	2,151	+70	2,221	+270	2,491	+780	3,271	Excluded	
One Nation	Jennifer Game	1,574	+84	1,658	+202	1,860	+167	2,027	Excluded			
Animal Justice	Steve Campbell	574	+12	586	+100	686	Excluded					
Family First	Lynton Barry	443	+123	566	Excluded							
Australian Family	Peter Ieraci	279	Excluded									

=== Elections in the 2010s ===
==== 2018 ====
2018 South Australian state election: Mawson
Party	Candidate	Votes	%	±%
Liberal	Andy Gilfillan	7,697	34.7	−9.7
Labor	Leon Bignell	7,688	34.7	+1.7
SA-Best	Hazel Wainwright	4,142	18.7	+18.7
Greens	Ami-Louise Harrison	1,789	8.1	−3.4
Conservatives	Heidi Greaves	867	3.9	−4.7
Total formal votes		22,183	96.7	−0.4
Informal votes		760	3.3	+0.4
Turnout		22,943	91.6	+3.8
Two-party-preferred result
Labor	Leon Bignell	11,149	50.3	+4.5
Liberal	Andy Gilfillan	11,034	49.7	−4.5
Labor gain from Liberal		Swing	+4.5	

2014 South Australian state election: Mawson
Party	Candidate	Votes	%	±%
Labor	Leon Bignell	9,666	45.0	−0.8
Liberal	Stephen Annells	8,012	37.3	+1.9
Family First	Geoff Doecke	1,944	9.1	+1.4
Greens	Katie Wright	1,843	8.6	+1.8
Total formal votes		21,465	96.9	+1.1
Informal votes		695	3.1	−1.1
Turnout		22,160	92.5	−1.1
Two-party-preferred result
Labor	Leon Bignell	11,925	55.6	+1.0
Liberal	Stephen Annells	9,540	44.4	−1.0
Labor hold		Swing	+1.0	

2010 South Australian state election: Mawson
Party	Candidate	Votes	%	±%
Labor	Leon Bignell	9,849	45.9	+2.1
Liberal	Matt Donovan	7,642	35.6	−4.3
Family First	Andrew Tainsh	1,570	7.3	+0.8
Greens	Palitja Moore	1,387	6.5	+1.4
Gamers 4 Croydon	Ben Ernst	413	1.9	+1.9
Save the RAH	David Senior	259	1.2	+1.2
Independent	Michael Lee	168	0.8	+0.8
Fair Land Tax	Harry Tsekouras	155	0.7	+0.7
Total formal votes		21,443	95.4	
Informal votes		941	4.6	
Turnout		22,384	93.5	
Two-party-preferred result
Labor	Leon Bignell	11,659	54.4	+2.2
Liberal	Matt Donovan	9,784	45.6	−2.2
Labor hold		Swing	+2.2	

=== Elections in the 2000s ===
2006 South Australian state election: Mawson
Party	Candidate	Votes	%	±%
Labor	Leon Bignell	8,886	43.8	+7.0
Liberal	Robert Brokenshire	8,087	39.9	−3.8
Family First	Roger Andrews	1,330	6.6	+0.0
Greens	Mika Kabacznik-Weller	1,019	5.0	+5.0
Democrats	Ibojka Baumann	476	2.3	−6.2
Dignity for Disabled	Joanne Harvey	469	2.3	+2.3
Total formal votes		20,267	96.2	−0.7
Informal votes		809	3.8	+0.7
Turnout		21,076	93.3	−1.3
Two-party-preferred result
Labor	Leon Bignell	10,572	52.2	+5.7
Liberal	Robert Brokenshire	9,695	47.8	−5.7
Labor gain from Liberal		Swing	+5.7	

2002 South Australian state election: Mawson
Party	Candidate	Votes	%	±%
Liberal	Robert Brokenshire	9,206	43.7	−1.1
Labor	Moira Deslandes	7,739	36.8	+3.5
Democrats	Angela Nicholas	1,791	8.5	−11.0
Family First	Michael Last	1,391	6.6	+6.6
One Nation	Bert Justin	585	2.8	+2.8
Independent	Benny Zable	336	1.6	+1.6
Total formal votes		21,048	96.9	
Informal votes		669	3.1	
Turnout		21,717	94.6	
Two-party-preferred result
Liberal	Robert Brokenshire	11,270	53.5	−0.3
Labor	Moira Deslandes	9,778	46.5	+0.3
Liberal hold		Swing	−0.3	

=== Elections in the 1990s ===
1997 South Australian state election: Mawson
Party	Candidate	Votes	%	±%
Liberal	Robert Brokenshire	9,031	46.2	−6.4
Labor	John McInnes	6,599	33.7	+2.3
Democrats	Graham Pratt	3,930	20.1	+13.1
Total formal votes		19,560	96.0	−0.9
Informal votes		815	4.0	+0.9
Turnout		20,375	93.2	
Two-party-preferred result
Liberal	Robert Brokenshire	10,695	54.7	−4.6
Labor	John McInnes	8,865	45.3	+4.6
Liberal hold		Swing	−4.6	

1993 South Australian state election: Mawson
Party	Candidate	Votes	%	±%
Liberal	Robert Brokenshire	11,208	52.5	+11.2
Labor	Michael Wright	6,634	31.1	−13.9
Democrats	Lenore Turney	1,420	6.7	−6.7
Independent	Peter Marshall	1,342	6.3	+6.3
Independent	Christopher Thornton	403	1.9	+1.9
Natural Law	Cliff Payne	333	1.6	+1.6
Total formal votes		21,340	96.7	−0.7
Informal votes		720	3.3	+0.7
Turnout		22,060	94.9	
Two-party-preferred result
Liberal	Robert Brokenshire	12,718	59.6	+12.2
Labor	Michael Wright	8,622	40.4	−12.2
Liberal gain from Labor		Swing	+12.2	

=== Elections in the 1980s ===
1989 South Australian state election: Mawson
Party	Candidate	Votes	%	±%
Labor	Susan Lenehan	10,484	49.6	−13.2
Liberal	Craig Spencer	7,776	36.8	+5.8
Democrats	Dennis Dorney	2,857	13.6	+7.4
Total formal votes		21,117	97.3	+0.2
Informal votes		593	2.7	−0.2
Turnout		21,710	94.9	+2.2
Two-party-preferred result
Labor	Susan Lenehan	12,105	57.3	−8.8
Liberal	Craig Spencer	9,012	42.7	+8.8
Labor hold		Swing	−8.8	

1985 South Australian state election: Mawson
Party	Candidate	Votes	%	±%
Labor	Susan Lenehan	11,152	62.8	+5.8
Liberal	Raija Havu	5,502	31.0	−5.1
Democrats	Tim Wells	1,095	6.2	−0.8
Total formal votes		17,749	97.1	
Informal votes		528	2.9	
Turnout		18,277	92.7	
Two-party-preferred result
Labor	Susan Lenehan	11,740	66.1	+5.1
Liberal	Raija Havu	6,009	33.9	−5.1
Labor hold		Swing	+5.1	

1982 South Australian state election: Mawson
Party	Candidate	Votes	%	±%
Labor	Susan Lenehan	11,968	53.1	+11.8
Liberal	Ivar Schmidt	9,067	40.3	−6.8
Democrats	Jay McMerrick	1,488	6.6	−5.0
Total formal votes		22,523	95.3	−1.0
Informal votes		1,113	4.7	+1.0
Turnout		23,636	94.6	−0.1
Two-party-preferred result
Labor	Susan Lenehan	12,737	56.6	+9.6
Liberal	Ivar Schmidt	9,786	43.4	−9.6
Labor gain from Liberal		Swing	+9.6	

=== Elections in the 1970s ===
1979 South Australian state election: Mawson
Party	Candidate	Votes	%	±%
Liberal	Ivar Schmidt	9,225	47.1	+9.5
Labor	Leslie Drury	8,082	41.3	−10.5
Democrats	Jay McMerrick	2,278	11.6	+1.0
Total formal votes		19,585	96.3	−2.1
Informal votes		749	3.7	+2.1
Turnout		20,334	94.7	−1.0
Two-party-preferred result
Liberal	Ivar Schmidt	10,384	53.0	+9.5
Labor	Leslie Drury	9,201	47.0	−9.5
Liberal gain from Labor		Swing	+9.5	

1977 South Australian state election: Mawson
Party	Candidate	Votes	%	±%
Labor	Leslie Drury	9,428	51.8	+1.1
Liberal	Tony Boyle	6,858	37.6	+18.0
Democrats	Charles Ferdinands	1,924	10.6	+10.6
Total formal votes		18,210	98.4	
Informal votes		295	1.6	
Turnout		18,505	95.7	
Two-party-preferred result
Labor	Leslie Drury	10,283	56.5	+1.3
Liberal	Tony Boyle	7,927	43.5	+43.5
Labor hold		Swing	N/A	

1975 South Australian state election: Mawson
Party	Candidate	Votes	%	±%
Labor	Don Hopgood	16,051	53.0	−8.6
Liberal Movement	Rodney Adam	8,110	26.7	+26.7
Liberal	Neil Bannister	6,149	20.3	−14.4
Total formal votes		30,310	96.4	−0.4
Informal votes		1,125	3.6	+0.4
Turnout		31,435	94.0	0.0
Two-candidate-preferred result
Labor	Don Hopgood	16,852	55.6	−8.5
Liberal Movement	Rodney Adam	13,458	44.4	+44.4
Labor hold		Swing	N/A	

1973 South Australian state election: Mawson
Party	Candidate	Votes	%	±%
Labor	Don Hopgood	13,812	61.6	+5.3
Liberal and Country	Leslie Scott	7,786	34.7	−9.0
Social Credit	George Gater	841	3.7	+3.7
Total formal votes		22,439	96.8	−1.0
Informal votes		730	3.2	+1.0
Turnout		23,169	94.0	−0.9
Two-party-preferred result
Labor	Don Hopgood	14,373	64.1	+7.8
Liberal and Country	Leslie Scott	8,056	35.9	−7.8
Labor hold		Swing	+7.8	

1970 South Australian state election: Mawson
Party	Candidate	Votes	%	±%
Labor	Don Hopgood	8,653	56.3	
Liberal and Country	Leslie Scott	6,719	43.7	
Total formal votes		15,372	97.8	
Informal votes		344	2.2	
Turnout		15,716	94.9	
Labor hold		Swing		
