= Bannon ministry =

66th ministry of government of South Australia

- 66th ministry of South Australia

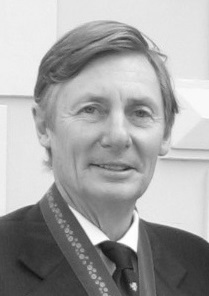
- John Bannon Jack Wright
- Date formed: 10 November 1982
- Date dissolved: 4 September 1992

People and organisations
- Monarch: Elizabeth II
- Governor: Donald Dunstan; Roma Mitchell
- Premier: John Bannon
- Deputy premier: Jack Wright; Don Hopgood
- No. of ministers: 13
- Member party: Labor
- Status in legislature: Majority government (1982–1989); Minority government (1989–1992)
- Opposition party: Liberal
- Opposition leader: John Olsen; Dale Baker; Dean Brown

History
- Election: 6 November 1982
- Predecessor: Tonkin ministry
- Successor: Arnold ministry

The Bannon ministry (Labor) was the 66th ministry of the Government of South Australia. It was led by the state's 39th premier, John Bannon. The Bannon ministry succeeded the Tonkin ministry on 10 November 1992, following Labor's victory at the state election held on 6 November. This ministry was succeeded by the Arnold ministry on 4 September 1992 as Bannon stepped down as the premier and Labor leader after the political repercussions of the State Bank collapse.

== Background ==
In the 1989 South Australian state election, the Labor Party, headed by John Bannon, lost its majority in the parliament. The Labor Party and Liberal Party secured 22 out of 47 seats each in the House of Assembly while the Independents (Labor) and the Nationals held the rest. The Labor Party formed the government with the help of the Independents.

Following this, the government had to deal with the repercussions of the collapse of the State Bank. On 1 September 1992, Bannon resigned from his position, taking political responsibility for the loss that the state bank incurred. Lynn Arnold, who had held the position of a minister under the Bannon government, was appointed premier on 4 September 1992, whereas Frank Blevins was elected as deputy premier uncontested.

A minority government, which relied upon independent members for its support, was what Arnold took over. The position of Labor within the parliament had become even weaker after the defection of Terry Groom from the party. At the beginning, the independents gave their support to Arnold's government, and Groom as well as Martyn Evans joined the ministry on 1 October 1992.

== Cabinet ==
Party	Portrait	Minister	Portfolio
Labor		John Bannon (1943–2015) MP for Ross Smith (1977–1993)	Premier; Leader of the South Australian Labor Party; Treasurer; Minister for the Arts (until 20 April 1989); Minister of State Development (until 18 December 1985; again from 14 December 1989)
Labor		Jack Wright (1927–1998) MP for Adelaide (1971–1985)	Deputy Premier (until 16 July 1985); Minister of Labour (until 16 July 1985); Minister of Public Works (until 10 February 1984); Chief Secretary (10 February 1984 – 16 July 1985); Minister of Emergency Services (10 February 1984 – 16 July 1985)
Labor		Don Hopgood (1938–) MP for Baudin (1977–1993)	Deputy Premier (from 16 July 1985); Minister for Environment and Planning (until 20 April 1989); Minister of Lands (until 16 July 1985); Minister of Repatriation (until 16 July 1985); Chief Secretary (16 July 1985 – 20 April 1989); Minister of Emergency Services (16 July 1985 – 20 April 1989); Minister of Water Resources (18 December 1985 – 29 July 1988); Minister of Health (4–12 August 1988; again from 20 April 1989); Minister of Community Welfare (4–12 August 1988; again 20 April – 14 December 1989); Minister for the Aged (from 20 April 1989); Minister of Family and Community Services (from 14 December 1989)
Labor		Chris Sumner (1943–) MLC (1975–1994)	Attorney-General; Minister of Consumer and Corporate Affairs (until 11 November 1982); Minister of Consumer Affairs (11 November 1982 – 14 December 1989); Minister of Corporate Affairs (from 11 November 1982); Minister of Ethnic Affairs (until 20 April 1989); Minister of Agriculture (22–27 April 1983); Minister of Fisheries (22–27 April 1983); Minister of Forests (22–27 April 1983); Minister for Crime Prevention (from 14 December 1989)
Labor		Brian Chatterton (1941–) MLC (1973–1987)	Minister of Agriculture (until 22 April 1983); Minister of Fisheries (until 22 April 1983); Minister of Forests (until 22 April 1983)
Labor		Roy Abbott (1927–2004) MP for Spence (1975–1989)	Minister of Transport (until 16 July 1985); Minister of Marine (until 29 July 1988); Minister of Lands (16 July 1985 – 29 July 1988); Minister of Forests (16 July 1985 – 29 July 1988); Minister of Repatriation (16 July 1985 – 29 July 1988)
Labor		John Cornwall (1935–2018) MLC (1975–1989)	Minister of Health (until 4 August 1988); Minister of Community Welfare (18 December 1985 – 4 August 1988)
Labor		Lynn Arnold (1949–) MP for Ramsay (1985–1993)	Minister of Education (until 18 December 1985); Minister for Technology (until 28 August 1986); Minister of Children's Services (6 June – 18 December 1985); Minister of Employment (16 July – 18 December 1985); Minister Assisting the Minister of State Development (16 July – 18 December 1985); Minister of State Development (18 December 1985 – 28 August 1986); Minister of Employment and Further Education (18 December 1985 – 20 April 1989); Minister of State Development and Technology (28 August 1986 – 14 December 1989); Minister of Agriculture (from 20 April 1989); Minister of Fisheries (from 20 April 1989); Minister of Ethnic Affairs (from 20 April 1989); Minister of Industry, Trade and Technology (from 14 December 1989)
Labor		Gavin Keneally (1933–2020) MP for Stuart (1970–1989)	Chief Secretary (until 10 February 1984); Minister of Tourism (until 16 July 1985); Minister of Local Government (10 February 1984 – 16 July 1985); Minister of Transport (16 July 1985 – 20 April 1989)
Labor		Ron Payne (1925–2015) MP for Mitchell (1970–1989)	Minister of Mines and Energy (until 29 July 1988)
Labor		Greg Crafter (1944–) MP for Norwood (1980–1993)	Minister of Community Welfare (until 18 December 1985); Minister of Aboriginal Affairs (until 20 April 1989); Minister of Education (from 18 December 1985); Minister of Children's Services (from 18 December 1985)
Labor		Jack Slater (1927–1997) MP for Gilles (1970–1989)	Minister of Water Resources (until 18 December 1985); Minister of Recreation and Sport (until 18 December 1985)
Labor		Terry Hemmings (1936–) MP for Napier (1977–1993)	Minister of Housing (until 10 February 1984); Minister of Local Government (until 10 February 1984); Minister of Housing and Construction (10 February 1984 – 14 December 1989); Minister of Public Works (19 February 1984 – 14 December 1989); Minister of Aboriginal Affairs (20 April – 14 December 1989)
Labor		Frank Blevins (1939–2013) MLC (1975–1985); MP for Whyalla (1985–1993)	Minister of Agriculture (27 April 1983 – 18 December 1985); Minister of Fisheries (27 April 1983 – 18 December 1985); Minister of Forests (27 April 1983 – 16 July 1985); Minister of Correctional Services (from 10 February 1984); Minister of Labour (16 July 1985 – 12 August 1988); Minister Assisting the Treasurer (16 July 1985 – 14 December 1989); Minister of Health (12 August 1988 – 20 April 1989); Minister of Transport (from 20 April 1989); Minister of Finance (from 14 December 1989)
Labor		Barbara Wiese (1950–) MLC (1979–1995)	Minister of Tourism (from 16 July 1985); Minister of Local Government (16 July 1985 – 20 April 1989); Minister of Youth Affairs (16 July 1985 – 20 April 1989); Minister Assisting the Minister for the Arts (18 December 1985 – 20 April 1989); Minister of State Services (20 April – 14 December 1989); Minister of Consumer Affairs (from 14 December 1989); Minister of Small Business (from 14 December 1989)
Labor		Kym Mayes (1947–) MP for Unley (1982–1993)	Minister of Agriculture (18 December 1985 – 20 April 1989); Minister of Fisheries (18 December 1985 – 20 April 1989); Minister of Recreation and Sport (from 18 December 1985); Minister of Employment and Further Education (20 April – 14 December 1989); Minister of Youth Affairs (20 April – 14 December 1989); Minister of Housing and Construction (from 14 December 1989); Minister of Public Works (from 14 December 1989)
Labor		Susan Lenehan (1943–) MP for Mawson (1982–1993)	Minister of Water Resources (from 29 July 1988); Minister of Lands (from 29 July 1988); Minister of Repatriation (29 July 1988 – 14 December 1989); Minister of Marine (29 July – 12 August 1988); Minister of Community Welfare (12 August 1988 – 20 April 1989); Minister Assisting the Minister of Health (12 August 1988 – 20 April 1989); Minister for Environment and Planning (from 20 April 1989)
Labor		John Klunder (1940–) MP for Todd (1985–1993)	Minister of Mines and Energy (from 29 July 1988); Minister of Forests (from 29 July 1988); Minister of Emergency Services (from 20 April 1989)
Labor		Bob Gregory (1936–) MP for Florey (1982–1993)	Minister of Labour (from 12 August 1988); Minister of Marine (from 12 August 1988); Chief Secretary (20 April – 14 December 1989); Minister of Occupational Health and Safety (from 14 December 1989)
Labor		Anne Levy (1934–) MLC (1975–1997)	Minister of Local Government (20 April 1989 – 10 January 1991); Minister for the Arts (20 April 1989 – 28 February 1991); Minister of State Services (from 14 December 1989); Minister for Local Government Relations (from 10 January 1991); Minister for the Arts and Cultural Heritage (from 28 February 1991)
Labor		Mike Rann (1953–) MP for Briggs (1985–1993)	Minister of Employment and Further Education (from 14 December 1989); Minister of Youth Affairs (from 14 December 1989); Minister of Aboriginal Affairs (from 14 December 1989); Minister Assisting the Minister of Ethnic Affairs (from 14 December 1989)

== Changes to the ministry ==
=== 4 September 1992: Formation ===
Arnold took the place of Bannon as premier. Blevins took the place of Don Hopgood as deputy premier and treasurer. Hopgood initially had charge of the portfolios of health, family, community services, and the aged.

=== 1 October 1992: Reshuffle ===
A cabinet reshuffle was done on 1 October 1992. Hopgood left the ministry, but Evans and Groom from the ranks of Independent Labor joined the ministry. Evans took up the responsibility for health, family and community services, and the age group, whereas Groom took up the portfolio of primary industries and minister assisting the premier in multicultural and ethnic affairs. Arnold took up economic development and minister for multicultural and ethnic affairs portfolios and gave up other portfolios previously held. Blevins took up the additional portfolio of mineral resources and surrendered finance, transport, and correctional services.

Reshuffling has also led to distribution of duties between the other ministers. Greg Crafter has been transferred from Education and Children's Services portfolio to that of Housing, Urban Development and Local Government Relations and Recreation and Sport. Susan Lenehan is now minister for education, employment and training, having been stripped off her previous duties of Environment and Planning, Lands and Water Resources. Kym Mayes took charge of Environment and Land Management, Emergency Services and Aboriginal Affairs, whereas John Klunder is the new Minister for Public Infrastructure. Bob Gregory is now Minister for Labour Relations and Occupational Health and Safety and for Correctional Services. Anne Levy has taken charge of Consumer Affairs and the Status of Women along with Arts and Cultural Heritage.

=== 3 September 1993: Reshuffle ===
Other changes came into force on 3 September 1993. Chris Sumner took up the justice position, while Gregory acquired the Correctional Services from him and took up the position of State Services from Rann. The portfolio title of Mayes was changed to minister for environment and natural resources.

== See also ==
- Cabinet of South Australia
