= Arnold ministry =

67th ministry of government of South Australia

- 67th ministry of South Australia

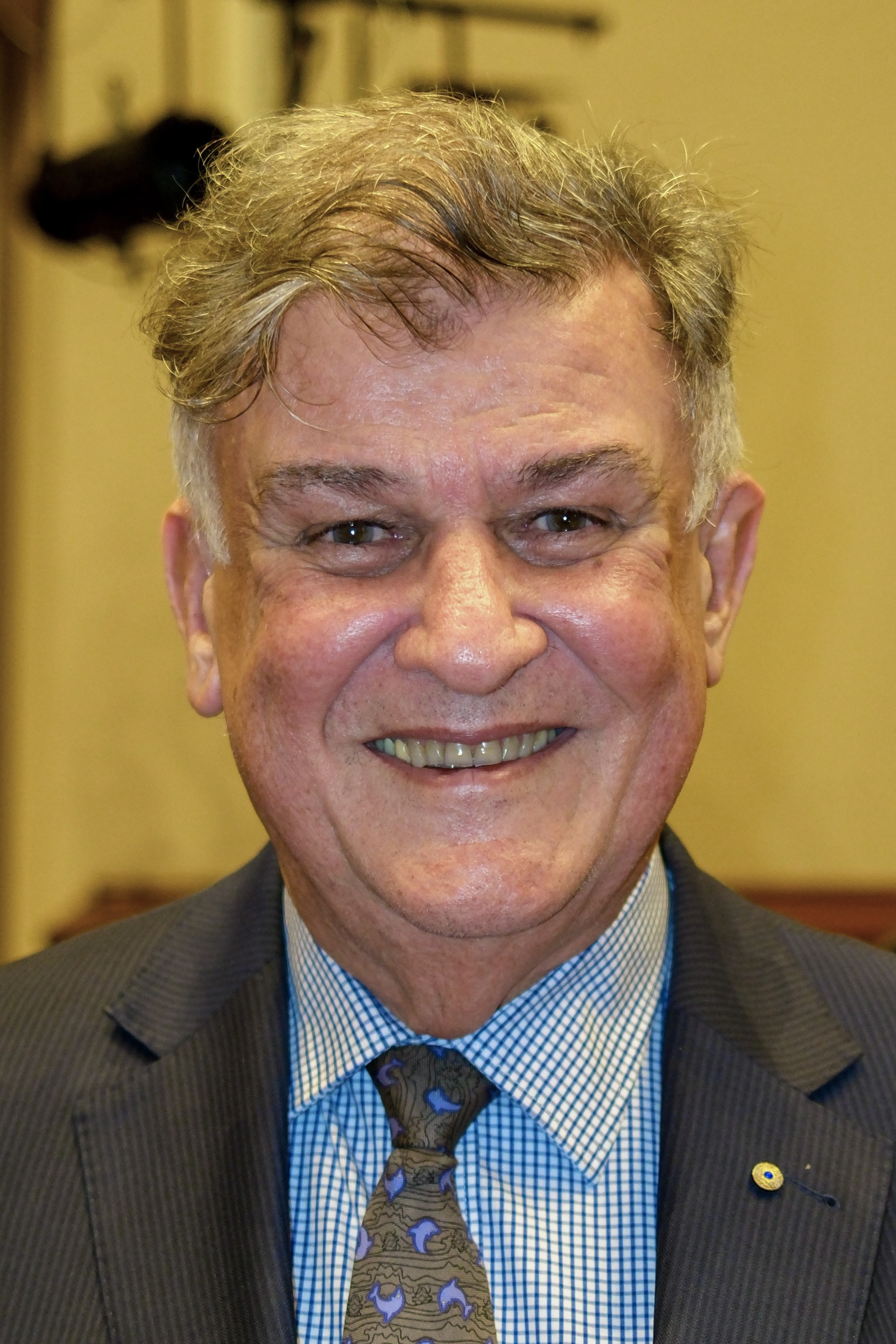
- Lynn Arnold
- Date formed: 4 September 1992
- Date dissolved: 14 December 1993

People and organisations
- Monarch: Elizabeth II
- Governor: Roma Mitchell
- Premier: Lynn Arnold
- Deputy premier: Frank Blevins
- No. of ministers: 13
- Member party: Labor/Independents
- Status in legislature: Minority government
- Opposition party: Liberal
- Opposition leader: Dean Brown

History
- Outgoing election: 11 December 1993
- Predecessor: Bannon ministry
- Successor: Brown ministry

The Arnold ministry (Labor) was the 67th ministry of the Government of South Australia. It was led by the state's 40th premier, Lynn Arnold. The Arnold ministry succeeded the Bannon ministry on 4 September 1992, following John Bannon's resignation as premier and Labor leader amid the political repercussions of the State Bank collapse. The ministry was replaced by the Brown ministry on 14 December 1993 following the state election held on 11 December, which saw the Liberal Party, led by Dean Brown, defeat Labor in a landslide.

== Background ==
In the 1989 South Australian state election, the Labor Party, headed by John Bannon, lost its majority in the parliament. The Labor Party and Liberal Party secured 22 out of 47 seats each in the House of Assembly while the Independents (Labor) and the Nationals held the rest. The Labor Party formed the government with the help of the Independents.

Following this, the government had to deal with the repercussions of the collapse of the State Bank. On 1 September 1992, Bannon resigned from his position, taking political responsibility for the loss that the state bank incurred. Lynn Arnold, who had held the position of a minister under the Bannon government, was appointed premier on 4 September 1992, whereas Frank Blevins was elected as deputy premier uncontested.

An unstable minority government, which relied upon independent members for its support, was what Arnold took over. The position of Labor within the parliament had become even weaker after the defection of Terry Groom from the party. At the beginning, the independents gave their support to Arnold's government, and Groom as well as Martyn Evans joined the ministry on 1 October 1992.

== Cabinet ==
Party	Portrait	Minister	Portfolio
Labor		Lynn Arnold (1949–) MP for Ramsay (1985–1993)	Premier; Leader of the South Australian Labor Party; Minister of State Development (until 1 October 1992); Minister of Industry, Trade and Technology (until 1 October 1992); Minister of Agriculture (until 1 October 1992); Minister of Fisheries (until 1 October 1992); Minister of Ethnic Affairs (until 1 October 1992); Minister of Economic Development (from 1 October 1992); Minister of Multicultural and Ethnic Affairs (from 1 October 1992)
Labor		Frank Blevins (1939–2013) MP for Whyalla (1985–1993)	Deputy Premier; Deputy Leader of the South Australian Labor Party; Treasurer; Minister of Finance (until 1 October 1992); Minister for Transport (until 1 October 1992); Minister of Correctional Services (until 1 October 1992); Minister of Mineral Resources (from 1 October 1992)
Labor		Don Hopgood (1938–) MP for Baudin (1977–1993)	Minister of Health (until 1 October 1992); Minister of Family and Community Services (until 1 October 1992); Minister for the Aged (until 1 October 1992)
Labor		Chris Sumner (1943–) MLC (1975–1994)	Attorney-General; Minister for Crime Prevention; Minister of Corporate Affairs (until 1 October 1992); Minister of Public Sector Reform (from 1 October 1992); Minister of Justice (from 3 September 1993); Minister of Correctional Services (from 3 September 1993)
Labor		Greg Crafter (1944–) MP for Norwood (1980–1993)	Minister of Education (until 1 October 1992); Minister of Children's Services (until 1 October 1992); Minister of Recreation and Sport (from 1 October 1992); Minister of Housing, Urban Development and Local Government Relations (from 1 October 1992)
Labor		Kym Mayes (1947–) MP for Unley (1982–1993)	Minister of Recreation and Sport (until 1 October 1992); Minister of Public Works (until 1 October 1992); Minister of Housing and Construction (until 1 October 1992); Minister of Emergency Services (from 1 October 1992); Minister of Aboriginal Affairs (from 1 October 1992); Minister of Environment and Land Management (1 October 1992 – 3 September 1993); Minister for the Environment and Natural Resources (from 3 September 1993)
Labor		Bob Gregory (1936–) MP for Florey (1982–1993)	Minister of Labour (until 1 October 1992); Minister of Marine (until 1 October 1992); Minister of Occupational Health and Safety (until 1 October 1992); Minister of Labour Relations and Occupational Health and Safety (from 1 October 1992); Minister of Correctional Services (1 October 1992 – 3 September 1993); Minister of State Services (from 3 September 1993)
Labor		Susan Lenehan (1943–) MP for Mawson (1982–1993)	Minister for Environment and Planning (until 1 October 1992); Minister of Lands (until 1 October 1992); Minister of Water Resources (until 1 October 1992); Minister of Education, Employment and Training (from 1 October 1992)
Labor		John Klunder (1940–) MP for Todd (1985–1993)	Minister of Mines and Energy (until 1 October 1992); Minister of Forests (until 1 October 1992); Minister of Emergency Services (until 1 October 1992); Minister of Public Infrastructure (from 1 October 1992)
Labor		Anne Levy (1934–) MLC (1975–1997)	Minister for the Arts and Cultural Heritage; Minister of State Services (until 1 October 1992); Minister for Local Government Relations (until 1 October 1992); Minister of Consumer Affairs (from 1 October 1992); Minister for the Status of Women (from 1 October 1992)
Labor		Barbara Wiese (1950–) MLC (1979–1995)	Minister of Tourism (until 1 October 1992); Minister of Small Business (until 1 October 1992); Minister of Consumer Affairs (until 1 October 1992); Minister of Transport Development (from 1 October 1992)
Labor		Mike Rann (1953–) MP for Briggs (1985–1993)	Minister of Employment and Further Education (until 1 October 1992); Minister of Youth Affairs (until 1 October 1992); Minister of Aboriginal Affairs (until 1 October 1992); Minister Assisting the Minister of Ethnic Affairs (until 1 October 1992); Minister of Business and Regional Development (from 1 October 1992); Minister of Tourism (from 1 October 1992); Minister of State Services (1 October 1992 – 3 September 1993)
Independent Labor (until 11 December 1993); Labor (from 11 December 1993)		Martyn Evans (1953–) MP for Elizabeth (1984–1994)	Minister of Health, Family and Community Services (from 1 October 1992); Minister for the Aged (from 1 October 1992)
Independent Labor		Terry Groom (1944–2021) MP for Hartley (1982–1993)	Minister of Primary Industries (from 1 October 1992); Minister Assisting the Premier on Multicultural and Ethnic Affairs (from 1 October 1992)

== Changes to the ministry ==
=== 4 September 1992: Formation ===
Arnold took the place of Bannon as premier. Blevins took the place of Don Hopgood as Deputy Premier and Treasurer. Hopgood initially had charge of the portfolios of health, family, community services, and the aged.

=== 1 October 1992: Reshuffle ===
A cabinet reshuffle was done on 1 October 1992. Hopgood left the ministry, but Evans and Groom from the ranks of Independent Labor joined the ministry. Evans took up the responsibility for Health, Family and Community Services, and The Age Group, whereas Groom took up the portfolio of Primary Industries and Minister Assisting the Premier in Multicultural and Ethnic Affairs. Arnold took up Economic Development and Minister for Multicultural and Ethnic Affairs portfolios and gave up other portfolios previously held. Blevins took up the additional portfolio of Mineral Resources and surrendered Finance, Transport, and Correctional Services.

Reshuffling has also led to distribution of duties between the other ministers. Greg Crafter has been transferred from Education and Children's Services portfolio to that of Housing, Urban Development and Local Government Relations and Recreation and Sport. Susan Lenehan is now Minister for Education, Employment and Training having been stripped off her previous duties of Environment and Planning, Lands and Water Resources. Kym Mayes took charge of Environment and Land Management, Emergency Services and Aboriginal Affairs, whereas John Klunder is the new Minister for Public Infrastructure. Bob Gregory is now Minister for Labour Relations and Occupational Health and Safety and for Correctional Services. Anne Levy has taken charge of Consumer Affairs and the Status of Women along with Arts and Cultural Heritage.

=== 3 September 1993: Reshuffle ===
Other changes came into force on 3 September 1993. Chris Sumner took up the Justice position, while Gregory acquired the Correctional Services from him and took up the position of State Services from Rann. The portfolio title of Mayes was changed to Minister for Environment and Natural Resources.

== See also ==
- Cabinet of South Australia
