= Electoral results for the district of Salisbury (South Australia) =

South Australian district election results

This is a list of election results for the electoral district of Salisbury in South Australian elections.

== Members for Salisbury ==
Member	Party	Term
Reg Groth	Labor	1970–1979
Lynn Arnold	Labor	1979–1985

== Election results ==
=== Elections in the 1980s ===
1982 South Australian state election: Salisbury
Party	Candidate	Votes	%	±%
Labor	Lynn Arnold	13,632	69.1	+8.3
Liberal	Derrick Rich	4,759	24.1	−15.1
Democrats	David Vigor	1,343	6.8	+6.8
Total formal votes		19,734	91.3	−1.7
Informal votes		1,868	8.7	+1.7
Turnout		21,602	92.8	−0.5
Two-party-preferred result
Labor	Lynn Arnold	14,316	72.5	+11.7
Liberal	Derrick Rich	5,418	27.5	−11.7
Labor hold		Swing	+11.7	

=== Elections in the 1970s ===
1979 South Australian state election: Salisbury
Party	Candidate	Votes	%	±%
Labor	Lynn Arnold	10,840	60.8	−8.7
Liberal	Derrick Rich	6,996	39.2	+8.7
Total formal votes		17,836	93.0	−2.0
Informal votes		1,336	7.0	+2.0
Turnout		19,172	93.3	+0.1
Labor hold		Swing	−8.7	

1977 South Australian state election: Salisbury
Party	Candidate	Votes	%	±%
Labor	Reg Groth	12,150	69.5	+7.1
Liberal	Ann Allen	5,333	30.5	+10.4
Total formal votes		17,483	95.0	
Informal votes		919	5.0	
Turnout		18,402	93.2	
Labor hold		Swing	+4.5	

1975 South Australian state election: Salisbury
Party	Candidate	Votes	%	±%
Labor	Reg Groth	10,398	62.1	−21.9
Liberal	Lancelot Chaplin	3,367	20.1	+20.1
Liberal Movement	Ronald Woods	2,984	17.8	+17.8
Total formal votes		16,749	94.6	+7.8
Informal votes		947	5.4	−7.8
Turnout		17,696	92.8	−1.1
Two-party-preferred result
Labor	Reg Groth	10,703	63.9	−20.1
Liberal	Lancelot Chaplin	6,046	36.1	+36.1
Labor hold		Swing	N/A	

1973 South Australian state election: Salisbury
Party	Candidate	Votes	%	±%
Labor	Reg Groth	10,943	84.0	+17.0
Independent	Robert Maczkowiack	2,079	16.0	+16.0
Total formal votes		13,022	86.8	−10.8
Informal votes		1,979	13.2	+10.8
Turnout		15,001	93.9	−0.9
Labor hold		Swing	N/A	

1970 South Australian state election: Salisbury
Party	Candidate	Votes	%	±%
Labor	Reg Groth	8,742	67.0	
Liberal and Country	Colin De Vos	3,711	28.5	
Social Credit	Philip Hobbs	587	4.5	
Total formal votes		13,040	97.6	
Informal votes		319	2.4	
Turnout		13,359	94.8	
Two-party-preferred result
Labor	Reg Groth	9,135	69.3	
Liberal and Country	Colin De Vos	3,905	30.7	
Labor hold		Swing		
