= Agent-General for South Australia =

Government representative of South Australia in the UK

- Coat of Arms of South Australia

- Flag of South Australia
- Incumbent; Leon Bignell since 27 May 2026
- Department of the Premier and Cabinet
- Status: Quasi-diplomatic representative
- Reports to: Premier of South Australia
- Seat: Australia Centre, High Commission of Australia, London
- Nominator: Premier of South Australia
- Appointer: Governor of South Australia
- Term length: Not exceeding five years
- Constituting instrument: Agent-General Act, 1901 (SA)
- Precursor: The Agent-Generals Act, 1889 (SA)
- Formation: 1856
- First holder: G. S. Walters
- Salary: $707,000 (2026/27)
- Website: Agent-General's Website

The Agent-General for South Australia is the official representative of the State of South Australia to the United Kingdom. The position is a quasi-diplomatic representative responsible for representing the State to the Crown and promoting South Australia's trade and economic interests in the United Kingdom and Europe. In 1858, South Australia was the first Australian colonial government to appoint an Agent-General.

== History ==
=== Pre-Responsible government in 1836-1857 ===
Before responsible government was achieved in the Province of South Australia in 1857, the Province was represented in the United Kingdom by the Colonial Agent Edward Barnard.

Barnard was one of two Agents-General appointed by the British Secretary of State for the Colonies, the other being George Baillie, these joint Agents-General worked within the Office of the Crown Agents for the Colonies and were appointed in March 1833. The colonies were divided between Barnard and Baillee, with South Australia (along with other Australian Colonies) being assigned to Barnard. The appointment of the Agent-General by the British government meant that Barnard was not appointed or paid by the Province, and in addition, Barnard's responsibilities in representing a considerable number of other overseas colonies around the world, likely placed considerable pressure on his workload.

In the mid-1850s, there was growing dissatisfaction with Barnard as Agent-General, and his conduct, from within a number of Australian colonies, including New South Wales and South Australia. Both South Australia and New South Wales had cited a number of concerns, including around the lack of communication from Barnard, his failure to sign contracts and agreements, and goods and services for which the colonies had paid but there was no delivery.

On 4 August 1854, the Governor of South Australia, Henry Young and provincial executive council, resolved to dismiss Mr Barnard as the province's Agent-General and appointed London-based mercantile agent, Alexander Foxcroft Ridgway, as the South Australian Agent-General, with his appointment on the basis he had acted as an agent in a private capacity for the Governor, and had fulfilled his duties.

The Governor wrote to the Colonial Secretary to inform the British government of the appointment and to arrange for payments to be made through the province's London treasury accounts. The Colonial Secretary, responded to the Governor in February 1855, stating that the appointment and dismissal were not valid, as the Governor "did not have any legislative authority" or sanction from the South Australian Legislature in line with other colonies at the time. Correspondence continued between the South Australian and British governments until August 1855, when the then-Governor Richard Graves MacDonnell wrote to Mr Ridgway officially cancelling his appointment as Agent-General, citing the objection of the British government. MacDonnel and the South Australian Government also wrote to the Colonial Secretary, informing the British government that the South Australian Parliament would soon appoint its own agent within the guidelines that had been outlined in previous correspondence.

With the Province obtaining a response government calls by members of the Parliament for South Australia to appoint its own Agent-General to represent the interests of the province grew; and a Select Committee was established by the Parliament to begin the process

=== Post-responsible government in 1857 ===
In June 1856, the Constitution Act 1856 (SA) was granted royal assent, which established responsible government in the province, allowing for democratic self-governance.

This allowed the Province to dispense with the Barnard and the Office of the Crown Agents for the Colonies so that an appropriate representative could be appointed by the Provincial government that could better serve the interests of South Australia with both the Crown and the greater British Empire.

=== Planning the new role ===
In 1856, the Provincial government sought applications for the role of new Agent-General for South Australia, receiving 27 applications from various candidates. However, the role was not immediately filled because a Parliamentary Select Committee was appointed in 1856 to investigate the future purpose of the role; however, at the expiry of the Parliamentary session, the committee was dissolved and not reinstated. However, the Parliament generally agreed that someone should fill the role with the sole interest of representing the Province, rather than a representative of multiple governments.

=== Appointment of the first Agent-General ===
With the initial 1855 appointment of Alexander Foxcroft Ridgway as Agent-General deemed invalid by the British Government, South Australia finally announced in May 1858 that the role of South Australia's first provincially appointed Agent-General had been offered to and accepted by Gregory Seale Walters. In September 1859, Walters' appointment was confirmed by the government in September 1858 by the Chief Secretary, and instructions on the role were tabled in the Parliament; Walters was set to take his post in London in early 1859, and Barnard would continue to represent the Province in London until this time.

South Australia was the first Australian colonial government to appoint an Agent-General, with Gregory Seale Walters taking the post in January 1859.

In 1889, the Parliament of South Australia passed The Agent-Generals Act, 1889 (SA), creating the post of Agent-General as a statutory body, setting the salary and tenure length of the position and directing the position would report to, and be directed by, the Treasurer of South Australia to perform their duties "the interests of the province".

=== Post-federation in 1901 ===
On 1 January 1901, as part of the Federation of Australia, the Province became the State of South Australia; however, it maintained its Agent-General in London and passed updated legislation to guide the role Agent-General Act, 1901 (SA). South Australia continues to maintain its Agent-General in London with the current Agent-General being former South Australian Minister and former Speaker of the Parliament, Leon Bignell.

== Modern role ==
Whilst the national interests of Australia are now represented by the Australian High Commissioner to the United Kingdom, South Australia maintains the role of Agent-General to:

- Encourage European companies to invest in South Australia;
- Seek opportunities and provide support for the export of South Australian products and services to Europe;
- Assist South Australian investors seeking investment opportunities in Europe;
- Encourage people to move to South Australia under the Skilled and Business Migration Schemes;
- Assist the State's Tourism Commission in attracting tourists to South Australia.

The Office of the Agent-General also assists in the:

- Promotion of South Australia, particularly in investment attraction, trade development and as a destination for business migrants and European tourists;
- Support and assistance to Ministers and government officials visiting the region;
- Work with South Australian businesses, industry associations and other agencies in establishing contacts in Europe to increase trade, financial and commercial activities of benefit to the State of South Australia; and
- Providing assistance in planning and preparing trade and investment missions from Europe to South Australia.

In 2015, the then Agent-General and advertising executive, Bill Muirhead established the South Australia Club in London as a means for South Australian expats and businesses to network with British and European businesses to leverage South Australia's trade and tourism opportunities. Since 2015, the club has grown across many countries around the world; with hopes of expanding further in the future.

== Diplomatic and legal status ==
=== Status in the United Kingdom ===
In the United Kingdom, Agents-General (and their Staff) are granted the same Diplomatic Privileges and Immunities held under international law by virtue of the "Consular Relations Act 1968", legislation.gov.uk, The National Archives, 1978 c. 30, this privilege is granted under "The Commonwealth Countries and Republic of Ireland (Immunities and Privileges) Order 1985", legislation.gov.uk, The National Archives, SI 1985/1983, these privileges including the right to freedom from arrest and exemption of duties and taxes.

=== Status in Australian and international law ===
Under international and Australian federal law, however, Agents-General have no diplomatic or legal status, privileges or immunities under international or Australian Federal laws but are generally granted the privilege of an Australian Diplomatic or Official Passport during their commission.

== Agents-General for South Australia ==
=== British appointed ===
| Order | Agent-General | Term commence | Term end | Notes |
|---|---|---|---|---|
| 1 | Edward Barnard | 1836 (Establishment of the Province) | 1858 | Appointed by the British Government |

=== South Australian government appointed ===
South Australia attempted to appoint its first Agent-General in 1854; however, the British Government deemed this appointment invalid as there was no legislative basis for an appointment to be made. The British appointed Agent, Edward Barnard, continued in the role until 1858.

| Agent-General designate | Appointed | Invalidated | Notes |
|---|---|---|---|
| Alexander Foxcroft Ridgway | 1854 | 1855 | South Australian appointment invalidated by Colonial Secretary - Governor had no legislative power to make appointment. |

Following the establishment of Responsible Government in the province, South Australia appointed its own Agents-General:

| Order | Agent-General | Portrait | Term commence | Term end | Notes |
|---|---|---|---|---|---|
| 1 | Gregory Seale Walters | | About September 1858 | 21 September 1865 | First appointment |
| 2 | Francis Dutton | | 21 September 1865 | 25 January 1877 | Died in office |
| 3 | Arthur Blyth | | 21 February 1877 | 7 December 1891 | Died in office |
| 4 | John Bray | | 6 January 1892 | 2 June 1894 | First under 1889 Act |
| 5 | Thomas Playford | | 2 June 1894 | 1 June 1898 | |
| 6 | John Cockburn | | 1 June 1898 | 29 May 1901 | |
| 7 | Henry Grainger | | 29 May 1901 (as State Agent); 9 April 1902 (as Agent-General) | 15 July 1905 | First under 1901 Act, First since Federation |
| 8 | John Jenkins | | 15 July 1905 | 27 March 1909 | |
| 9 | Andrew Kirkpatrick | | 27 March 1909 | 14 May 1914 | |
| 10 | John Beeby Whiting | | 14 May 1914 | 21 January 1915 | Acting |
| 11 | Frederick Young | | 21 January 1915 | 21 April 1918 | |
| 12 | Edward Lucas | | 21 April 1918 | 22 April 1925 | |
| 13 | John Price | | 22 April 1925 | 22 April 1928 | |
| 14 | Henry Barwell | | 22 April 1928 | 22 April 1933 | |
| 15 | Lionel Hill | | 22 April 1933 | 21 September 1934 | |
| 16 | Charles McCann | | 21 September 1934 | 10 July 1958 | |
| 17 | Alfred Greenham | | 10 July 1958 | 21 March 1961 | |
| 18 | Malcolm Pearce | | 21 March 1961 | 26 August 1965 | |
| 19 | Lance Milne | | 26 August 1965 | 21 March 1971 | |
| 20 | Raymond Taylor | | 21 March 1971 | 17 January 1974 | |
| 21 | John Samson White | | 17 January 1974 | 1 January 1977 | |
| 22 | Wilton Maxwell Scriven | | 1 January 1977 | 1 October 1980 | |
| 23 | John Rundle | | 1 October 1980 | 1 June 1986 | |
| 24 | Geoffrey Walls | | 1 June 1986 | 19 January 1998 | |
| 25 | Maurice de Rohan | | 19 January 1998 | 5 October 2006 | Died in office |
| 26 | Bill Muirhead | | 26 March 2007 | 19 July 2021 | |
| 27 | David Ridgway | | 19 July 2021 | 27 May 2026 | |
| 28 | Leon Bignell | | 27 May 2026 | incumbent | |

== See also ==
- Agent-General
- Agent-General for New South Wales
- Crown Agent
- Colonial agent
