= Electoral district of Salisbury =

Electoral district of Salisbury may refer to:

- Electoral district of Salisbury (Queensland), a former electoral district of the Legislative Assembly of Queensland
- Electoral district of Salisbury (South Australia), a former electoral district of the South Australian House of Assembly
- Salisbury (UK Parliament constituency), a current electoral district of the UK House of Commons
