= Electoral results for the district of Baudin =

South Australian district election results

This is a list of election results for the electoral district of Baudin in South Australian elections.

== Members for Baudin ==
Member	Party	Term
Don Hopgood	Labor	1977–1993

== Election results ==
=== Elections in the 1980s ===
1989 South Australian state election: Baudin
Party	Candidate	Votes	%	±%
Labor	Don Hopgood	9,809	48.3	−11.9
Liberal	Pamela Howard	7,349	36.2	+3.3
Democrats	Nicholas Wedge	2,466	12.2	+7.2
Independent	Lyall McDonald	663	3.3	+3.3
Total formal votes		20,287	96.6	+0.4
Informal votes		722	3.4	−0.4
Turnout		21,009	93.9	+2.0
Two-party-preferred result
Labor	Don Hopgood	11,173	55.1	−8.6
Liberal	Pamela Howard	9,114	44.9	+8.6
Labor hold		Swing	−8.6	

1985 South Australian state election: Baudin
Party	Candidate	Votes	%	±%
Labor	Don Hopgood	10,681	60.2	+2.2
Liberal	Bill Fraser	5,831	32.9	+0.9
Democrats	D Perrotin	883	5.0	−5.0
Independent	Mort Daly	339	1.9	+1.9
Total formal votes		17,734	96.2	
Informal votes		699	3.8	
Turnout		18,433	91.9	
Two-party-preferred result
Labor	Don Hopgood	11,296	63.7	+0.7
Liberal	Bill Fraser	6,438	36.3	−0.7
Labor hold		Swing	−0.7	

1982 South Australian state election: Baudin
Party	Candidate	Votes	%	±%
Labor	Don Hopgood	12,802	61.8	+13.6
Liberal	Deane Clough	6,068	29.3	−8.9
Democrats	Ivor Childs	1,838	8.9	−4.7
Total formal votes		20,708	93.5	−1.5
Informal votes		1,441	6.5	+1.5
Turnout		22,149	93.4	+1.0
Two-party-preferred result
Labor	Don Hopgood	13,721	66.2	+10.5
Liberal	Deane Clough	6,987	33.8	−10.5
Labor hold		Swing	+10.5	

=== Elections in the 1970s ===
1979 South Australian state election: Baudin
Party	Candidate	Votes	%	±%
Labor	Don Hopgood	8,918	48.2	−18.5
Liberal	Thomas Mitchell	7,083	38.2	+4.9
Democrats	Paul Dawe	2,520	13.6	+13.6
Total formal votes		18,521	95.0	−1.0
Informal votes		969	5.0	+1.0
Turnout		19,490	92.4	−1.3
Two-party-preferred result
Labor	Don Hopgood	10,321	55.7	−11.0
Liberal	Thomas Mitchell	8,200	44.3	+11.0
Labor hold		Swing	−11.0	

1977 South Australian state election: Baudin
Party	Candidate	Votes	%	±%
Labor	Don Hopgood	11,463	66.7	+9.6
Liberal	Mervyn Sawade	5,722	33.3	+11.9
Total formal votes		17,185	96.0	
Informal votes		713	4.0	
Turnout		17,898	93.7	
Labor hold		Swing	+6.4	
