= Malcolm Kinnaird =

Australian engineer (1933–2014)

Malcolm Alexander Kinnaird AC DUniv FIEAust FTSE (1933–2014) was a South Australian engineer, joint founder of international engineering company Kinhill Engineering responsible for many major engineering projects including the Alice Springs to Darwin railway line. Within South Australia, he was responsible for developing West Lakes, North Haven and the David Jones building.

Kinnaird was born and educated in Adelaide, graduating with a Bachelor of Engineering in 1959.

In 1960, he founded Kinnaird Hill de Rohan and Young, with Don Hill, Howard Young and Maurice de Rohan. It became Kinhill Engineering and was acquired by KBR in 1997.

In 2003, he led the "Kinnaird Review" of the defence procurement processes which laid out an integrated approach to the management of defence procurement.

Kinnaird was the founder of the Cruising Yacht Club of South Australia.

== Recognition ==
- 1991 Honorary Fellow of the Institution of Engineers, Australia
- 1991 Officer of the Order of Australia (AO)
- 1998 Chevalier de l'Ordre de la Legion d'Honneur
- 2000 Honorary Doctor of the University, University of South Australia
- 2001 Centenary Medal
- 2003 South Australian of the Year
- 2006 Inaugural appointee to the South Australian Engineers Hall of Fame
- 2009 Companion of the Order of Australia (AC)
- 2010 Honorary Doctor of the University, University of Adelaide
