= Disaster Action =

Disaster Action is a British charity founded in 1991 by survivors and bereaved relatives of UK and overseas disasters. In the late 1980s, there were a number of serious incidents in which many people died, such as the sinking of the MV Jupiter (1961), Hillsborough, the Herald of Free Enterprise, Lockerbie bombing, the Marchioness, Piper Alpha and UTA Flight 772. Maurice de Rohan from the Herald Families Association realised that the issues the Herald families were experiencing would almost certainly be encountered by others in similar disasters. He, along with like minded individuals, founded the charity. It won a Guardian charity of the year award in 2004 for excellence in its field.

== Development ==
The organisation has evolved and developed through the years with one significant development being the introduction of legislation to provide for remedies against Corporate manslaughter, which culminated with a new law coming into force on 1 April 2008. The charity has also generated income through charging fees for presentations by members on training courses for corporate bodies based on members' experience.

== Funding and status ==
The Joseph Rowntree Charitable Trust funded much of the organisation's early work on corporate responsibility as well as offering core funding for five years from 2003. The Esmee Fairbairn Foundation and then the Golden Bottle/Bulldog trusts also gave grants for core funding.
