= Bill Muirhead =

Australian advertising executive and politician

Bill Muirhead AO
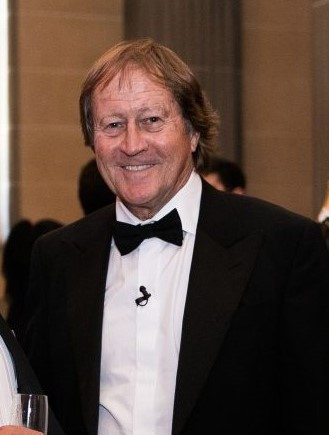

26th Agent-General for South Australia
- In office 26 March 2007 – 19 July 2020
- Preceded by: Maurice de Rohan
- Succeeded by: David Ridgway

Personal details
- Born: Adelaide, South Australia
- Spouse: Jeanne
- Children: 3
- Occupation: Advertising executive

William Mortimer Muirhead AO (born 1946) is an Adelaide-born senior advertising executive and was the Agent General for South Australia in London. He took the position of Agent General 2007 at the request of Premier Mike Rann.

== Early life and education ==
Muirhead's childhood was in Adelaide, South Australia. During his childhood he grew up surrounded by notable media families such as the Murdochs.

Muirhead moved to London as an adolescent, under the belief that he would return to his native Australia soon. He studied at St Dunstan's College in South London.

Muirhead initially wanted to study architecture, but went on to study commercial art before moving into advertising. Due to fortuitous networking he met the Saatchi brothers aged 23.

== Career ==
Muirhead's career in advertising began in 1970 with Ogilvy & Mather, and he joined Saatchi & Saatchi in 1972. He is a former Chief Executive and President of Saatchi & Saatchi Worldwide, when he was based in New York. Muirhead worked on British Airways advertising campaigns for two decades and on numerous Conservative Party political campaigns. He also worked with Qantas, Toyota, BP, News International and the COI.

He was a co-founder of the Famous Porkinson Banger Company in 1985 with Norman Parkinson and Paul Arden. The concept behind the brand was to revive the classic British banger, and was known in particular for its distinctive packaging, as inspired by the photographer and co-founder Norman Parkinson.

Following Maurice Saatchi's 1995 ousting from Saatchi & Saatchi, Muirhead resigned and along with Saatchi, David Kershaw and Jeremy Sinclair became a founding partner of M&C Saatchi and he remains an executive director as of 2019.

In 2014, Muirhead was appointed as a non-executive director of Executive Channel International (ECI). This was part of the Australian agency's restructuring as they moved towards expanding their digital and technology markets.

Muirhead along with his fellow partners at M&C Saatchi is a key investor in the alternative office space firm Second Home, which is expanding into new London and international locations.

In 2026, Muirhead provided backing to the London-based biosecurity startup Muirhead Industries C.I.C.

== Politics ==
Muirhead has a keen interest in politics, and has listed Question Time as his favourite television program. His work in advertising helped advance the interests of the Conservative Party in 1991 and lead the advertising team that helped the party win the 1992 election. With Jeremy Sinclair, Muirhead picked up the Conservative Party's election campaign in 2010. Reflecting on the process, he said:

"A simple thing that I learnt from doing this work was that you never win an election by doing what I call positive campaigning. You only win by attacking your opponent, because that's what people remember."

Muirhead was appointed Agent General for South Australia by Premier Mike Rann in 2007. In 2015, his tenure was extended to 2017. The announcement was endorsed by politicians from Labor and Liberal parties, including: Premier Jay Weatherill, leader of the Opposition Steven Marshall and Australian High Commissioner to Great Britain, Alexander Downer.

In 2013, The Independent wrote of Muirhead that "he explains, with surprising earnestness, how he is banging the drum for foreign investment (in South Australia) in everything from defence to mining."

In May 2015, Senior government sources told The Advertiser that Muirhead is one of few agency officials to have direct access to Premier Jay Weatherill.

In September 2016, Muirhead accompanied Premier Weatherill on a delegation to Onkalo, Finland's underground nuclear waste storage laboratory, following the recommendations of the 2015–16 Nuclear Fuel Cycle Royal Commission in South Australia. Madeline Richardson, the CE of the Department of the Premier & Cabinet's Nuclear Fuel Cycle Royal Commission Consultation and Response Agency (CARA) and John Mansfield, chair of the CARA's advisory board were also members of the delegation. Muirhead told The Advertiser that he was not concerned about nuclear waste storage negatively impacting existing food and wine exporters. He said of the subject:

"Any fear I had about that has been put aside. I think the more that people understand about the whole process and cycle, the less the fear is. I actually love the idea of us being pioneers and doing things first."

== Honours ==
In 2013, Muirhead became a Member (AM) in the General Division of the Order of Australia, for significant service to the community of South Australia through the promotion of international trade. As the Agent General for South Australia, Muirhead is the state's representative in Britain. As his tenure has been extended, Muirhead will have served his role for more than a decade.

In 2023, Muirhead was promoted to Officer of the Order of Australia (AO).

In 2011, Muirhead also founded the South Australia Club, an international community for those with investment in the state. Members include people connected to South Australia through business, politics, academia, media and the arts.

Muirhead has also been involved in the Mentor Me programme in South Australia, an initiative to help young Britons to find constructive work and develop useful skills for employment. The initiative was created to try and showcase South Australian business opportunities.

== Personal life ==
Muirhead is married to Jeanne, and they have three adult sons. He grew up in Adelaide where he knew the Murdoch family. Muirhead moved to London as a teenager.

Diplomatic posts
Preceded by Maurice de Rohan	Agent-General for South Australia; 2007–2021	Succeeded by David Ridgway
