= Ivar Schmidt =

Australian politician

Ivar Schmidt (born 28 December 1946) is an Australian politician who represented the South Australian House of Assembly seat of Mawson for the Liberal Party from 1979 to 1982.

South Australian House of Assembly
Preceded by Leslie Drury	Member for Mawson; 1979–1982	Succeeded by Susan Lenehan
