= David Ridgway (politician) =

Australian politician (born 1960)

The Honourable David Ridgway
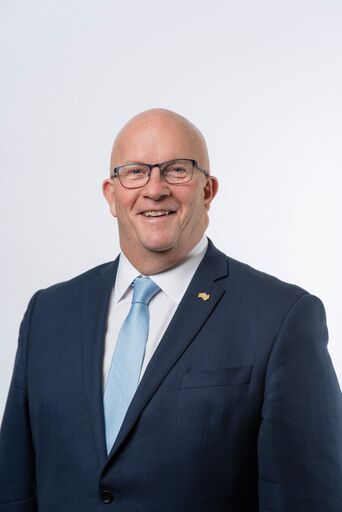

27th Agent-General for South Australia
- In office 19 July 2021 – 26 May 2026
- Preceded by: Bill Muirhead
- Succeeded by: Leon Bignell

Minister for Trade and Investment
- In office 22 March 2018 – 26 July 2020
- Premier: Steven Marshall
- Preceded by: Martin Hamilton-Smith (as Minister for Investment and Trade)
- Succeeded by: Stephen Patterson

Minister for Tourism
- In office 22 March 2018 – 11 January 2020
- Premier: Steven Marshall
- Preceded by: Leon Bignell
- Succeeded by: Steven Marshall (absorbed into Premier's portfolio)

Member of the Legislative Council
- In office 9 February 2002 – 30 June 2021
- Preceded by: Trevor Griffin
- Succeeded by: Heidi Girolamo

Personal details
- Born: David Wickham Ridgway; 14 November 1960 (age 65) Adelaide, South Australia
- Party: Liberal Party of Australia (SA)

David Wickham Ridgway (born 14 November 1960) is a South Australian politician who served as a member of the South Australian Legislative Council from 2002 to 2021, representing the Liberal Party of Australia (SA). Ridgway served as the Minister for Trade and Investment in the Marshall Ministry from 22 March 2018 to 26 July 2020, and as Minister for Tourism from March 2018 to January 2020.

== Background ==
Ridgway was elected state president of the South Australian Rural Youth Movement in 1982–83. In 1984 he won a six-month youth study tour to the UK. This experience heightened his interest in politics, especially in primary industries and regional development.

Ridgway began working on the family farm and at 19 he took on management of the family's horticultural business. After purchasing the business in 1997 with his wife Meredith, they expanded the operation to become the largest producer of gladioli corms in Australia and New Zealand.

== Parliament ==
Ridgway was elected from fourth position on the Liberal ticket at the 2002 election and from first position on the Liberal ticket at the 2010 election.

Ridgway was appointed a Shadow Parliamentary Secretary in 2005, and after the 2006 election was appointed Shadow Minister for Environment and Conservation, the River Murray and Urban Development & Planning, under the leadership of Iain Evans. A leadership change in April 2007, in which Martin Hamilton-Smith assumed Liberal Party leadership, prompted a re-shuffle of the Party's Shadow Cabinet, at which point Ridgway was made Shadow Minister for Police and Mineral Resources Development, whilst retaining his Shadow Urban Development & Planning post. David Ridgway also assisted the Leader of the Opposition with the Multicultural Affairs portfolio. In February 2013, Ridgway was further promoted to the crucial portfolios of Agriculture, Food and Fisheries, Forests and Tourism. Between 2007 and 2018 Ridgway served as the Leader of the Opposition in the Legislative Council.

Following the 2018 state election Ridgway was appointed as Minister for Trade, Tourism and Investment. Ridgway was relieved of his Tourism ministerial responsibilities in the immediate aftermath of the devastation of Kangaroo Island and other South Australian tourist areas during the 2019–20 bushfires when the Premier, Steven Marshall assumed that ministerial role on 11 January 2020. On 13 January 2020, by proclamation of the Governor, Ridgway was relieved of the Tourism portfolio in his ministerial position. In July 2020, Ridgway resigned from cabinet, indicating he was unwilling to serve in a reshuffled ministry following the resignation of Stephan Knoll and Tim Whetstone over an expenses scandal.

Ridgway resigned from the Legislative Council in June 2021 in order to be appointed as South Australia's Agent-General in London.

== Personal life ==
He currently resides in Adelaide and has three children.

Political offices
Preceded by Leon Bignell as Minister for Tourism	Minister for Trade, Tourism and Investment; 2018–2020	Succeeded by Steven Marshall as Premier of South Australia
Preceded by Martin Hamilton-Smith as Minister for Investment and Trade	Minister for Trade, Tourism and Investment; 2018–2020	Succeeded by Himself as Minister for Trade and Investment
Preceded by Himself as Minister for Trade, Tourism and Investment	Minister for Trade and Investment; 2020	Succeeded by Stephen Patterson
Preceded by Rob Lucas	Leader of the Opposition in the Legislative Council; 2007–2018	Succeeded by Kyam Maher
Diplomatic posts
Preceded by Bill Muirhead	Agent-General for South Australia; 2021–2026	Succeeded by Leon Bignell
