= Maurice de Rohan =

Australian engineer and government representative (1936-2006)

Maurice de Rohan AO OBE

25th Agent-General for South Australia
- In office 19 January 1998 – 5 October 2006
- Preceded by: Geoffrey Walls
- Succeeded by: Bill Muirhead

Personal details
- Born: 13 May 1936 Adelaide, South Australia
- Died: 5 October 2006 (aged 70) London, United Kingdom
- Education: University of Adelaide
- Occupation: Engineer

Maurice John de Rohan AO OBE (13 May 1936 – 5 October 2006) was an Australian engineer, former Agent General for South Australia, and nominee for Governor of South Australia.

== Career ==
Born in Adelaide, Australia, de Rohan graduated from the University of Adelaide in 1960 with a degree in civil engineering. Aged 23 he jointly founded Kinnaird Hill de Rohan and Young (later Kinhill Engineers Pty Ltd) as a partner and then Director.

The Company expanded to all other States of Australia and grew to become one of the Australia’s biggest engineering and planning consulting groups. In 1976, after the firm’s joint venture with Llewellyn-Davies Weeks International, de Rohan became deputy chairman and managing director of the London-based firm. He became a founding member of Australian Business in Europe, a director in 1978, and president in 1982-83. He also became a Fellow of the British Institute of Management.

The loss of his daughter, Alison, and son-in-law, Francis Gaillard, in the 1987 Zeebrugge ferry disaster was a turning point in his life. He, along with other families, established the Herald Families’ Association, which aimed to achieve greater justice and awareness of the need for higher standards of ferry safely. He was appointed an Officer of the Order of the British Empire (OBE) in the 1992 Birthday Honours List for his role in founding it. In turn, this led to the founding of the charity Disaster Action in 1991.

In 1998 he was appointed Agent-General for South Australia, based in the High Commission of Australia, London.

At Lord's Cricket Ground, he was chairman of the estates committee for seven years, having become a Marylebone Cricket Club member in 1986. He was closely involved in a continuing program of development that transformed facilities for players, spectators and officials, completed on time and within budget, thanks largely to his supervision. At Lord's his most significant achievement was the widely praised £8 million (A$20) refurbishment of the Victorian Pavilion, completed as the 2006 season opened. de Rohan also supervised renewal of the Mound Stand's distinctive tented roof.

Just before he died on 5 October 2006, he was nominated by the Premier of South Australia, Hon Mike Rann MP to succeed Marjorie Jackson-Nelson as Governor of South Australia, a post he was to take up on his return to Adelaide. However, soon after learning of the honour, knowing he was suffering from cancer, his condition worsened. Hours before his death, he was made an Officer of the Order of Australia (AO) at a special presentation conducted by the Australian High Commissioner Hon Richard Alston AO witnessed by family and close friends. This award was gazetted with the 2007 Australia Day Honours.

He was an avid supporter and member of the Port Adelaide Football Club, and in the days before his death was planning the club's international match at The Oval against archrivals the Geelong Football Club in October 2006.

Since his death his home city of Adelaide has created a number of memorials, including the Maurice de Rohan International Scholarship at the University of South Australia.
