= Robert Brokenshire =

Australian politician

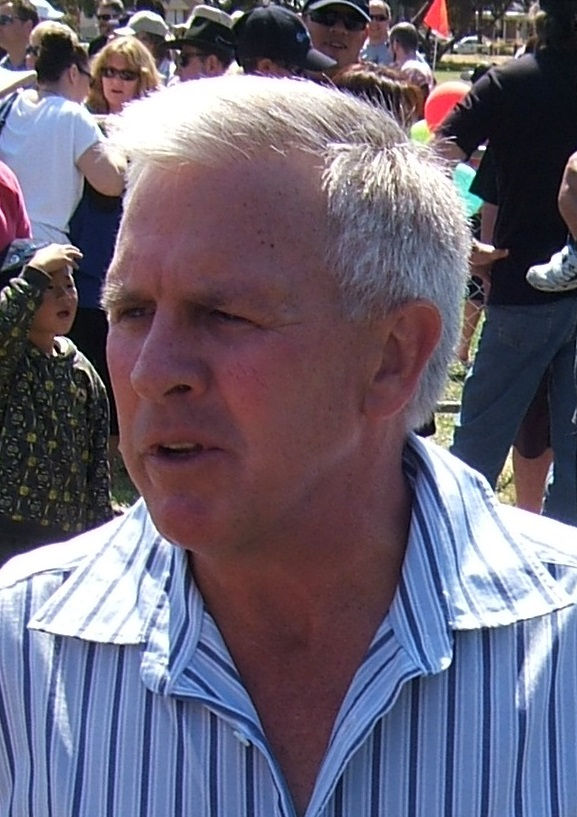

Member of the South Australian Legislative Council
- In office 24 July 2008 – 17 March 2018

Member of the South Australian Parliament for Mawson
- In office 11 December 1993 – 18 March 2006
- Preceded by: Susan Lenehan
- Succeeded by: Leon Bignell

Personal details
- Born: 1957 (age 68–69)
- Party: Liberal Party (1993–2006; 2018—Present); Family First (2008–2017); Australian Conservatives (2017–2018)
- Profession: Dairy farmer

Robert Lawrence Brokenshire (born 1957) is a South Australian dairy farmer and former member of the South Australian Parliament. He represented the Australian Conservatives from 26 April 2017 to election defeat in 2018, and Family First Party before that.

== Political career ==
Between 1993 and 2006, Brokenshire represented the Liberal Party as the elected member for the electoral district of Mawson in the South Australian House of Assembly (the Parliament's lower house).

On 24 July 2008, Brokenshire replaced Andrew Evans in the South Australian Legislative Council (the Parliament's upper house), representing the conservative Family First Party.

Brokenshire provides political commentary on the community radio station 88.7 Coast FM monthly on the Thursday Magazine show, presented by Dave Hearn.

=== Liberal Party ===
Elected in 1993 to the seat of Mawson with the Dean Brown Liberal Party government, he was re-elected in 1997 and 2002.

In 1998, Brokenshire was promoted to cabinet in the John Olsen government. His roles included Minister for Police, Correctional Services & Emergency Services, Minister for Gambling, Minister for Volunteers, and in opposition, Shadow Minister for Health. Brokenshire served three parliamentary terms representing the Liberal Party.

After losing the seat to Labor at the 2006 election, he was denied Liberal Party pre-selection for Mawson for the next election.

=== Family First Party ===
Brokenshire contested the seat of Kingston for the Family First Party in the 2007 federal election, receiving 5.71 percent of the vote. On 18 March 2008, he was chosen by Family First to replace Andrew Evans, who had retired from the Legislative Council, and Brockenshire was sworn in on 24 July 2008. A few years later, he expressed interest in switching to a Lower House seat, but never did so.

Brokenshire has employed the Freedom of Information legislation as part of his political strategy.

Brokenshire sat on various parliamentary committees, including the Public Works Committee, Select Committee on the Emergency Services Levy, Families SA Committee, Aboriginal Lands Parliamentary Standing Committee, Budget and Finance Committee, Certain Matters Relating to Horse Racing in South Australia, and Natural Resources Committee. He opposed the abolition of the Legislative Council.

=== Australian Conservatives ===
In 2017, Brokenshire and Dennis Hood joined the Australian Conservatives when Family First ceased to exist. He failed in his bid to be re-elected to the Legislative Council at the 2018 South Australian election.

== Personal life ==
Brokenshire's family is of Welsh descent.

== See also ==
- Seal culling in South Australia

== Related pages ==
- Members of the South Australian Legislative Council, 2010–2014
