= Reg Groth =

Australian politician (1914–1994)

Reginald William Groth (1 February 1914 – 20 March 1994) was an Australian politician who represented the South Australian House of Assembly seat of Salisbury from 1970 to 1979 for the Labor Party.

Parliament of South Australia
New district	Member for Salisbury; 1970 – 1979	Succeeded by Lynn Arnold
