= Leslie Drury =

Australian politician

Leslie Drury was an Australian politician who represented the South Australian House of Assembly seat of Mawson for the Labor Party from 1977 to 1979.

South Australian House of Assembly
Preceded by Don Hopgood	Member for Mawson; 1977–1979	Succeeded by Ivar Schmidt
