= Jenni Mitton =

Australian politician

Jenni Mitton MP

Member of the South Australian House of Assembly for Mawson
- Incumbent
- Assumed office 21 March 2026
- Preceded by: Leon Bignell

Personal details
- Party: Labor
- Profession: Business manager

Jennifer Ann Mitton is an Australian Labor politician who currently serves as the member for Mawson in the South Australian House of Assembly. Immediately prior to her election at the 2026 South Australian state election, Mitton worked as the office manager for her predecessor, Leon Bignell.

Prior to entering politics, Mitton served in numerous business management, marketing and consultancy positions including as General manager of Willunga Farmers Market. In 2019, Mitton accepted the SA Tourism Award for Excellence in Food Tourism on behalf of Willunga Farmers Market.

South Australian House of Assembly
Preceded by Leon Bignell	Member for Mawson; 2026–present	Incumbent
