= Crown Agent =

Crown Agent may refer to:

- The Crown Agent, principal legal advisor to the Scottish Lord Advocate on prosecution matters
- A member of a Crown Agency
