= Leon Bignell =

Australian politician

The Honourable Leon Bignell

28th Agent-General for South Australia
- Incumbent
- Assumed office 27 May 2026
- Preceded by: David Ridgway

38th Speaker of the South Australian House of Assembly
- In office 11 April 2024 – 20 March 2026
- Preceded by: Dan Cregan
- Succeeded by: Nat Cook

Minister for Agriculture, Food, Fisheries Minister for Forests
- In office 26 March 2014 – 19 March 2018
- Premier: Jay Weatherill
- Preceded by: Gail Gago
- Succeeded by: Tim Whetstone (as Minister for Primary Industries)

Minister for Tourism, Recreation and Sport
- In office 21 January 2013 – 19 March 2018
- Premier: Jay Weatherill
- Preceded by: Gail Gago (Tourism); Tom Kenyon (Recreation and Sport)
- Succeeded by: David Ridgway (Tourism); Corey Wingard (Recreation and Sport)

Member of the South Australian House of Assembly for Mawson
- In office 18 March 2006 – 20 March 2026
- Preceded by: Robert Brokenshire
- Succeeded by: Jenni Mitton

Personal details
- Born: 30 July 1966 (age 60)
- Party: Labor (Note: Bignell resigned his membership of the Labor Party in 2024 to take up the position of Speaker of the South Australian House of Assembly, following earlier passage of legislation requiring the Speaker not be a member of any political party up until July 1 of the year before a state election. It was confirmed in late 2025 he had re-joined the Labor Party.)
- Other political affiliations: Independent (Speaker) (2024–2025)

Leon William Kennedy Bignell (born 30 July 1966), is a former journalist and Labor and independent politician who represented the electoral district of Mawson in the South Australian House of Assembly from 2006 to 2026. Bignell is currently the Agent-General for South Australia-designate, and will take on the role from 27 May 2026.

== Political career ==
Bignell finished ahead of incumbent Liberal member Robert Brokenshire with a 52.2 percent two party preferred vote at the 2006 state election, delivering Mawson to Labor for the first time since it was lost in the 1993 election landslide. He increased his two-party-preferred vote to 54.4 percent at the 2010 election, bucking not only the statewide trend, but decades of voting patterns in the seat. Mawson was Labor's second most marginal seat, and on paper it should have been among the first to be lost to the Liberals in the event of a uniform swing large enough to topple Labor from office. Bignell's victory was critical in allowing Labor to eke out a narrow two-seat majority.

Bignell increased his majority to 55.6 percent at the 2014 election, again against the statewide trend.

The 2016 draft redistribution ahead of the 2018 election proposed to redistribute Bignell's seat of Mawson from a 5.6 percent Labor seat to a notional 2.6 percent Liberal seat, taking in areas down the coast as well as Kangaroo Island.

Bignell is affectionately known as "Biggles" in media circles, and was once caught drawing caricatures of his opposition colleagues while in the chamber. Bignell was engaged to Labor colleague and former member for Bright Chloë Fox between March 2006 and March 2007.

Bignell entered cabinet in January 2013 as the Minister for Agriculture, Food and Fisheries, Minister for Forests, Minister for Tourism, Minister for Recreation and Sport and Minister for Racing in the Weatherill Labor cabinet until the 2018 state election.

He is aligned with Labor's left faction.

Bignell temporarily become an independent from April 2024 to sit as Speaker of the South Australian House of Assembly. He announced in November 2025 that he would not contest the 2026 election.

== Notes ==
South Australian House of Assembly
Preceded by Robert Brokenshire	Member for Mawson; 2006–2026	Succeeded by Jenni Mitton
Preceded by Dan Cregan	Speaker of the South Australian House of Assembly; 2024–2026	Succeeded by TBD
Political offices
Preceded by Gail Gago	Minister for Tourism; 2013–2018	Succeeded by David Ridgway as Minister for Trade, Tourism and Investment
Preceded by Tom Kenyon	Minister for Recreation and Sport; 2013–2018	Succeeded by Corey Wingard as Minister for Recreation, Sport and Racing
New title	Minister for Racing; 2014–2018	Succeeded by Corey Wingard as Minister for Recreation, Sport and Racing
Preceded by Gail Gago	Minister for Agriculture, Food and Fisheries; 2014–2018	Succeeded by Tim Whetstone as Minister for Primary Industries and Regional Development
Preceded by Gail Gago	Minister for Forests; 2014–2018	Succeeded by Tim Whetstone as Minister for Primary Industries and Regional Development

Diplomatic posts
Preceded by David Ridgway	Agent-General for South Australia; 2026–	Incumbent
