= Lynn Arnold =

Australian politician and priest (born 1949)

The Honourable Reverend Lynn Arnold AO FAICD
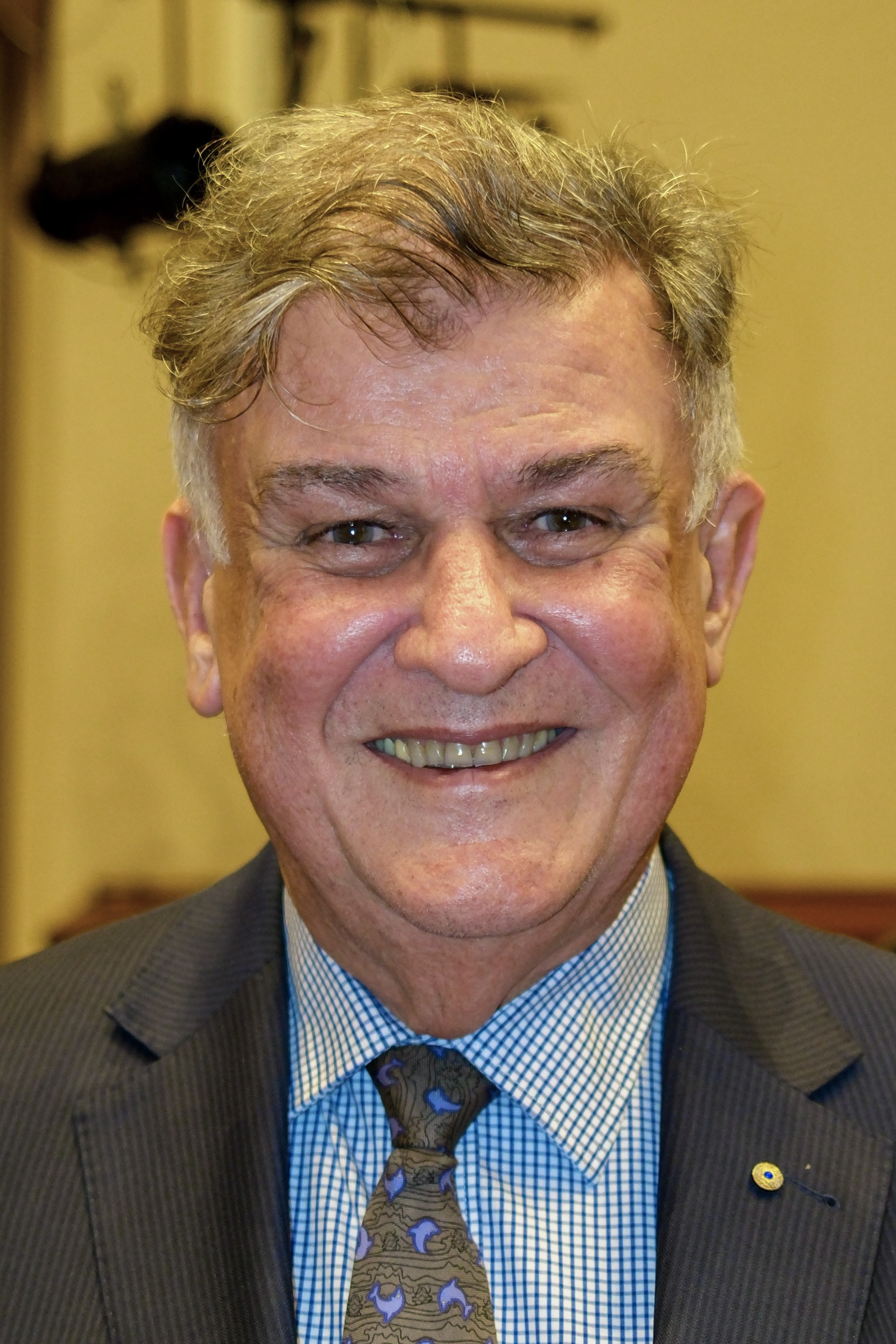
- Arnold in 2026

40th Premier of South Australia
- In office 4 September 1992 – 14 December 1993
- Monarch: Elizabeth II
- Governor: Roma Mitchell
- Deputy: Frank Blevins
- Preceded by: John Bannon
- Succeeded by: Dean Brown

Leader of the Opposition in South Australia
- In office 14 December 1993 – 20 September 1994
- Deputy: Mike Rann
- Preceded by: Dean Brown
- Succeeded by: Mike Rann

Leader of the South Australian Labor Party
- In office 4 September 1992 – 20 September 1994
- Deputy: Frank Blevins; Mike Rann
- Preceded by: John Bannon
- Succeeded by: Mike Rann
Parliamentary offices
Member of the South Australian Parliament for Taylor
In office 11 December 1993 – 5 November 1994
Preceded by	Constituency established
Succeeded by	Trish White
Member of the South Australian Parliament for Ramsay
In office 7 December 1985 – 11 December 1993
Preceded by	Constituency established
Succeeded by	Mike Rann
Member of the South Australian Parliament for Salisbury
In office 15 September 1979 – 7 December 1985
Preceded by	Reg Groth
Succeeded by	Constituency abolished

Personal details
- Born: 27 January 1949 (age 77) Durban, Union of South Africa
- Party: Labor
- Spouse: Elaine
- Children: 5
- Education: University of Adelaide (BA; BEd; PhD)
- Occupation: Activist; politician; priest
- Website: lynnarnold.com.au
- Lynn Arnold's voice Arnold speaking about reconciliation Recorded 3 June 2026

Lynn Maurice Ferguson Arnold (born 27 January 1949) is an Australian Anglican priest and former politician who represented the South Australian branch of the Australian Labor Party (ALP). He was Premier of South Australia from 1992 to 1993 and as Leader of the Opposition from 1993 to 1994.

Arnold was born in Durban, South Africa, and arrived in Australia in 1960. He attended Adelaide Boys' High School and had a politicised youth, joining the anti-war movement at school actively opposing Australia's involvement and conscription in the Vietnam War. While at the University of Adelaide, he was a senior student activist, organising protests and episodes of civil disobedience that earned him multiple arrests. In 1970, he joined an International Fellowship of Reconciliation peace mission to Vietnam, which reinforced his dedication to non-violence and the power of collective civic opposition. Arnold's activism during this period reflected his commitment to peace, social justice, and democratic participation. He graduated from the University of Adelaide with a Bachelor of Arts in 1979.

Arnold worked first in secondary education and with the Society of Friends before being elected to the South Australian Parliament in 1979 as the Labor member for Salisbury. Over the following decade, he held a range of ministerial portfolios in John Bannon's government, including Education, Technology, Employment, and Industry, contributing to the state's economic transition towards high-technology and industrial development. He succeeded Bannon as premier in September 1992 following the State Bank collapse, leading efforts to stabilise the state's finances and reform the public sector. But Labor was comprehensively defeated in the 1993 election, in power for eleven years. Arnold lost his Ramsay seat, to Mike Rann, but won the new Taylor seat. He returned to office briefly as Leader of the Opposition before retiring from politics in September 1994, when Rann became party leader.

On retiring from the parliament in 1994, Arnold pursued senior company administration studies at ESADE in Barcelona before pursuing a career in humanitarian and community service. He was chief executive for Anglicare and World Vision, most recently as Regional Vice President, Asia-Pacific. Concurrently with his professional life, he earned a PhD in sociolinguistics in 2003 from the University of Adelaide. Arnold subsequently headed Anglicare SA from 2008 to 2012 and headed the Don Dunstan Foundation from 2010 to 2020. He was ordained as an Anglican priest in 2014 and worked concurrently with public life, hosting a weekly radio program and was a reader of public theology at St Barnabas Theological College. In 2022, he learnt from a partial Australian Security Intelligence Organisation (ASIO) document that he had been spied on for decades since his anti–Vietnam War activism.

== Early life and activism ==
Lynn Maurice Ferguson Arnold was born on 27 January 1949 in Durban, Union of South Africa, to a South African father and an English mother. He developed an early interest in politics, recalling that at the age of six he aspired to become prime minister and, as a teenager, was fascinated by election nights, calculating results by hand before computers were in use. He relocated to Adelaide in 1960. By the age of twelve, he had attended eight primary schools and lived in four different countries, which required him and his sister to continually adjust to new surroundings. Educated at Adelaide Boys' High School, Arnold became politically active during his final year in 1965, when he was involved in the emerging anti-Vietnam War movement. Deeply influenced by nightly television reports of the conflict in Indochina, he regarded the war as morally wrong and strongly opposed Australia's participation, a view intensified by his disapproval of the government's introduction of conscription.

Upon entering the University of Adelaide, after a brief delay due to his father's sabbatical, Arnold joined the campaign against the Vietnam War as an active and vocal activist. He quickly assumed a leadership role in coordinating demonstrations and campaigns, engaging in direct civil disobedience as a form of protest. Viewing Australia's involvement in the war as politically driven alignment with the United States rather than an ideological necessity, drawing inspiration from earlier peace movements such as the Peace Pledge Union, the Women's International League for Peace and Freedom, and the Save Our Sons movement. He had planned to become a conscientious objector if called up, but his draft number was not displayed. After giving it some thought, he said he regretted signing up for the draft at all because many of his friends had not. His activism led to four arrests, including a five-day detention in Adelaide Gaol for refusing to pay a fine imposed for distributing leaflets without a permit, a protest he regarded as a defence of free speech. Arnold later recalled the atmosphere of the marches as one of solidarity and shared commitment to peace.

In 1970, Arnold joined an International Fellowship of Reconciliation peace mission to Vietnam, where he participated in a student demonstration at the University of Saigon that was dispersed with tear gas. He later recounted how local residents aided protesters by using lemons to ease the effects of the gas, and he returned to Australia with empty tear gas canisters as mementos of the event. Arnold believed deeply in the principle of people power, the capacity of democratically engaged citizens to influence government policy, and applied this philosophy during the first Moratorium to End the War in Vietnam in South Australia in May 1970, which sought to mobilise public opinion against the war and conscription. He later graduated from the University of Adelaide with a Bachelor of Arts in 1979.

== Political career ==
=== Bannon government (1979–1992) ===
Arnold worked in secondary education and with the Society of Friends before entering the South Australian Parliament as an Australian Labor Party (ALP) member for Salisbury on 15 September 1979, at the age of 30. Due to his Christian convictions, he swore loyalty to the Crown rather than the customary Bible oath, declaring that his word was sufficient. During the premiership of John Bannon, Arnold was made the Minister of Education from 10 November 1982 until 18 December 1985. Additionally, he worked as the Minister for Technology from 10 November 1982 until 28 August 1986. While working in this capacity, he approved the building of a A$110,000 kindergarten in Kirton Point in May 1983 and also authorised the development of a $1.5 million Aberfoyle Hub Primary School which would be able to hold around 300 pupils in May 1984. In September 1985, he called for more flexibility regarding school hours especially for rural children.

Following a cabinet reshuffle, Arnold was appointed Minister of Children's Services from 6 June to 18 December 1985, as well as Minister of Employment and Minister Assisting the Minister of State Development from 16 July to 18 December that year. After the abolition of his electorate later in 1985, he transferred from Salisbury to represent Ramsay from 7 December 1985. Arnold subsequently held a series of senior ministerial portfolios, as Minister of Employment and Further Education from December 1985 to April 1989, Minister of State Development until August 1986, and Minister of State Development and Technology until December 1989. He officially opened a local history cottage at Flinders Park and Port Lincoln in November 1987, a project constructed by trainees through a Youth Employment Programme.

From April 1989 to October 1992, Arnold was Minister of Agriculture, Minister of Ethnic Affairs, and Minister of Fisheries, and from December 1989 to October 1992 he also held the portfolio of Minister of Industry, Trade and Technology. During this period, he contributed to the economic strategy of Bannon, supporting the state's transition from traditional manufacturing towards computer-aided and high-technology industries while remaining actively involved in industrial and technological development. Following a trade and investment mission to Thailand, China, and Hong Kong in May 1989, Arnold stated that South Australian agricultural products and technologies were in strong demand overseas. In August 1989, he launched a $33.5 million rural assistance financing package for the 1989–1990 financial year to support struggling farmers, particularly those on the Eyre Peninsula. In October 1989, Arnold also confirmed that the phase one refurbishment of Victor Harbor High School, including new classroom, science, and humanities facilities, remained on schedule for completion.

While in government, Arnold completed his Bachelor of Education from the University of Adelaide in 1990. On the other hand, he did not only continue to work actively in the capacity of minister but also officially opened the Yankalilla Agricultural Show and encouraged citizens to voice their opinions directly to him. On 14 November, Arnold opened the Flaxley Research Centre. He delivered several statements in early 1991 about violations in fishing such as the use of prohibited yabbie pots and abalone poaching and referred to some recent court punishments related to fisheries offences. In March1, he inaugurated the State-wide Saltwatch project, a program carried out in schools, and targeting the problem of dryland salinity in South Australia.

In May 1991, Arnold provided funds for a revegetation project along the roadsides in Inman Valley–Torrens Vale region, a project headed by Landcare Australia. On 11 June, he announced the plan entitled "Decade of Landcare Plan for South Australia," which was a strategic guide meant to encourage sustainable practices in the land management sector. In July, he countered the claims stating that metropolitan South Australia was favored over the rural districts concerning the distribution of government aid. The next month, he appointed four members to the advisory board of agriculture representing various regional agricultural bureaus within South Australia. Soon after in August 1991, he justified the management of the fishing quotas of snapper fish and dismissed the claims about making the fishery into a fiasco, stating that the objections misinterpreted the quotas applied in other fishing industries. In August 1992, Arnold announced the appointment of Ted Chapman to act as an independent chair of the Gulf St Vincent Prawn Fishery management committee based on parliamentary recommendations.

=== Premiership (1992–1993) ===
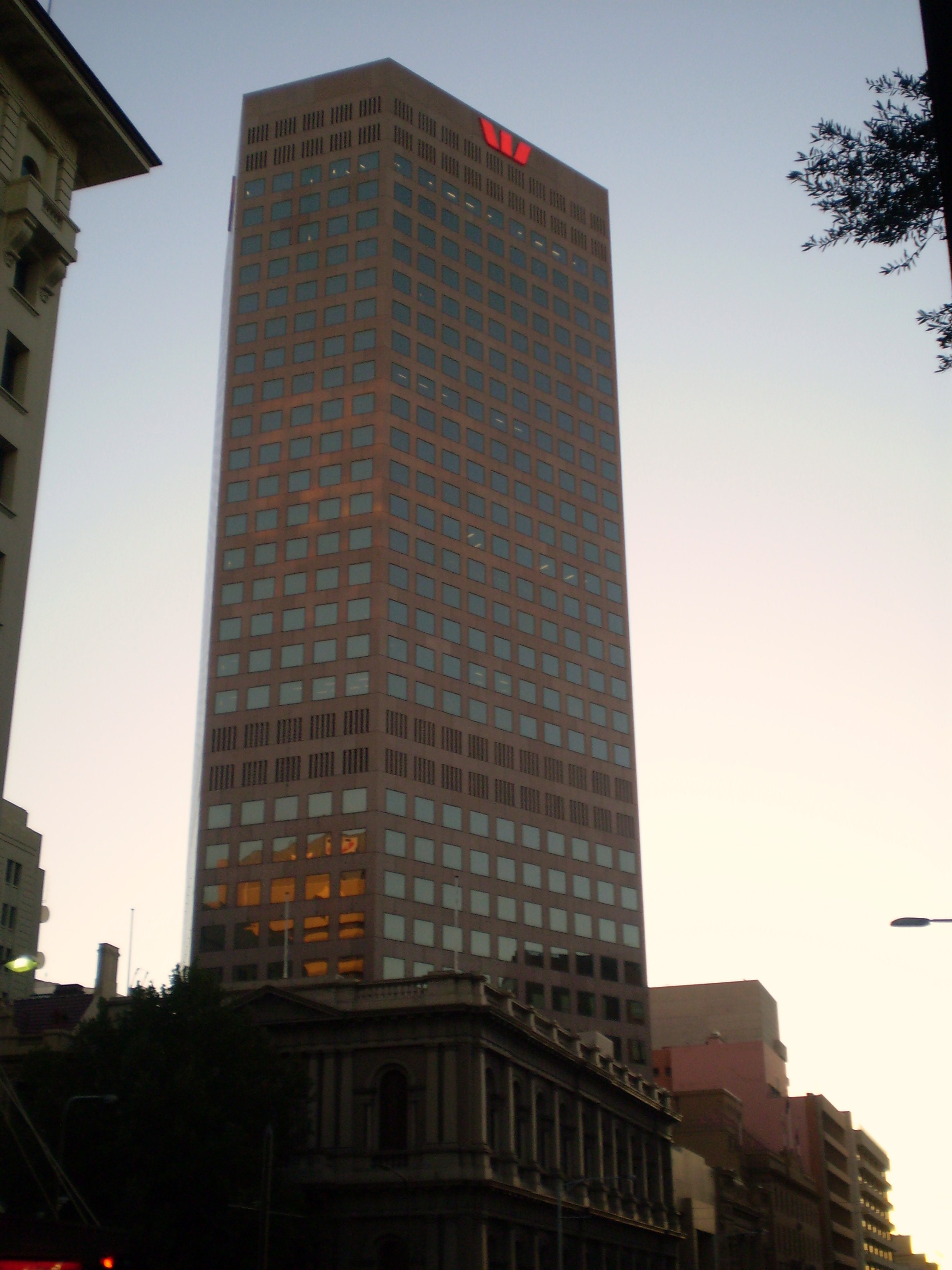
The former State Bank Building, now RAA Place, in Adelaide on 26 February 2008

As a result of the resignation of Bannon due to political pressure following the failure of the State Bank of South Australia worth $3.2 billion, Arnold was elected by all members of the South Australian Labor caucus as the new Premier of South Australia on 4 September 1992, while Frank Blevins was chosen unopposed as deputy premier. Arnold concurrently held the portfolio of Minister of State Development. After taking office, he acknowledged institutional and political failings connected to the State Bank crisis while seeking to distance his government from responsibility for the scandal. On 30 September, following the resignation of senior ministers associated with the crisis, Arnold appointed independents Martyn Evans and Terry Groom, both aligned with the ALP, to the cabinet in what was effectively a coalition-style arrangement. Arnold subsequently led a politically unstable minority government. On 23 November 1992, he stated that a proposed Liberal Opposition no-confidence motion against Speaker Norm Peterson would damage the reputation of Parliament.

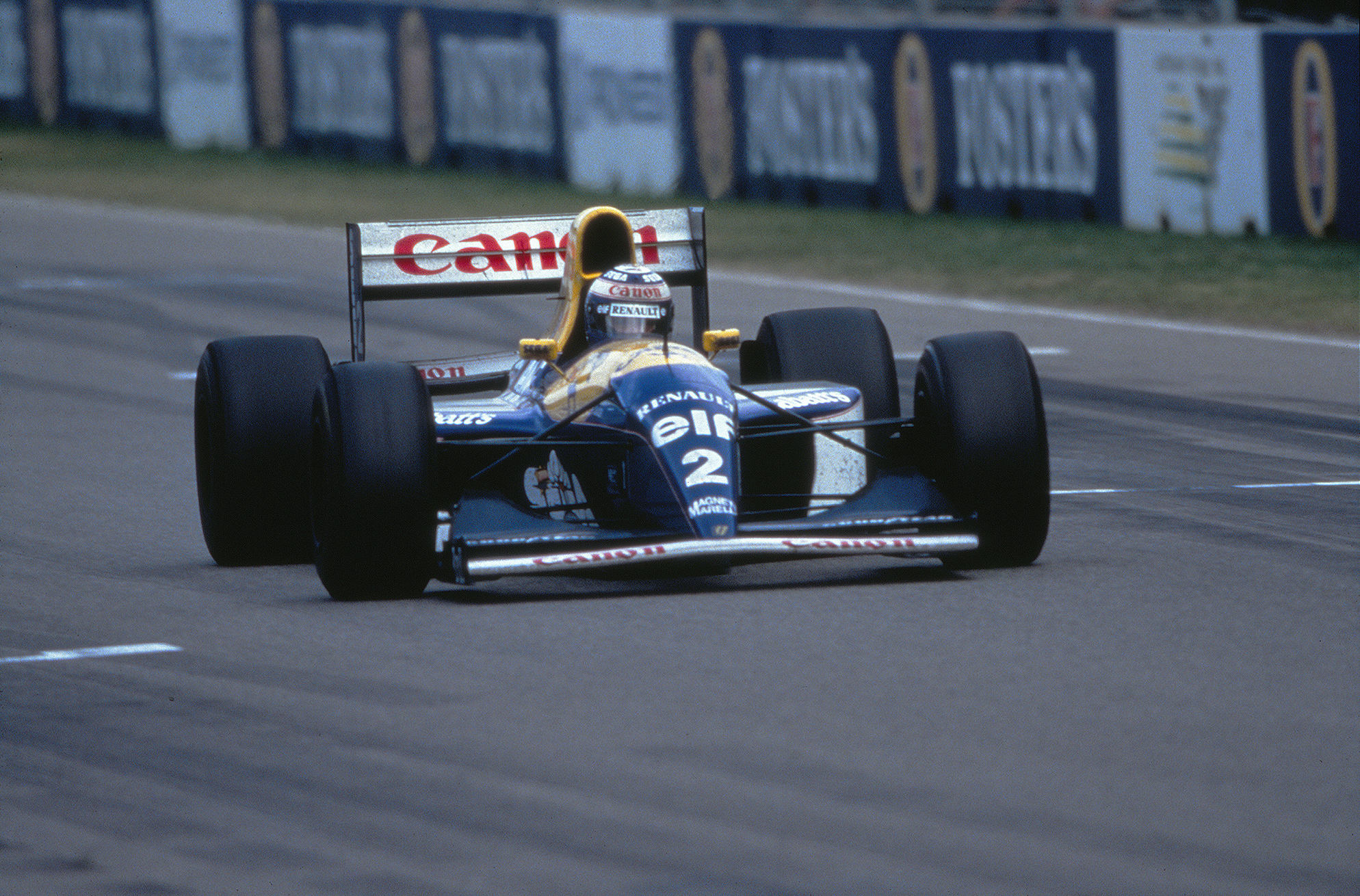
Alain Prost at the 1993 Australian Grand Prix in Adelaide. Arnold sought exemptions from tobacco-advertising restrictions affecting the event.

As premier, Arnold took steps towards stabilising the economy of South Australia and promoting its development. Lynn presided over the State Planning Review in order to strike a balance between planning and regulation. Despite his government's lack of close relations with the local governments, Arnold was determined to solve many of the problems faced by the people. The year 1993 marked his first international trip as premier, in which he wanted to establish some long-term deals regarding the Adelaide Grand Prix and compensation for the Aboriginal people of Maralinga who were victims of nuclear testing by the British.

In February 1993, Arnold dismissed the allegations made by Opposition Leader Dean Brown regarding the government's plan to sell off the State Bank to the Commonwealth Bank. He announced on 23 April 1993 an economic restructuring program that would run for three years as a response to the financial crisis afflicting the state via the reduction of 3,000 public servants, the downsizing of departments and the selling off of assets worth around $2 billion. Also, business tax breaks and export incentives were part of the program while maintaining plans for privatisation of the State Bank and the unification of the electricity and water services within the state. Following assent on 27 May, the Labor government, with Greg Crafter as Planning Minister, repealed the City of Adelaide Development Control Act 1976, ending Adelaide's separate status under the legislation. Arnold headed a delegation to pay a courtesy call to Jiang Chunyun in May 1993. In the wake of fears held by livestock leaseholders regarding a land claim made by the Marree–Arabunna people in northern South Australia, Arnold wrote to livestock leaseholders in August 1993 to allay their concerns arising from this claim. It was also in this very month that he called for an election, under pressure politically and within his own party as a result of the State Bank fiasco.

On 1 October 1993, Arnold handed over his previous portfolio and at the same time took up the ministries of Economic Development and Multicultural and Ethnic Affairs. This period was marked by the issuance of a continuous annual economic plan along with a social development strategy by his government. As a result of the findings of the Arthur D. Little report, Arnold instituted a Public Sector Reform portfolio, named after Chris Sumner, and through an interim economic statement titled Meeting the Challenge, he outlined a reform plan that include the removal of 3,000 full-time equivalent jobs. Amongst other policies aimed at promoting industrial development, Arnold's administration sought to attract investment in a solar optical manufacturing plant in the southern suburbs and the establishment of an Air International plant in Golden Grove.

In this period, a statement given by Arnold in the ministerial statement of 9 September 1993 has been used to base the formation of the Select Committee in the South Australian Legislative Council. On 1 November, Brown said that Arnold had been aware of the problem at the State Bank about four years prior to the bailout of the government. Despite his reputation as an honest parliamentarian and skilled speaker according to Tony Zappia, the Arnold government saw its fortunes decline as it lost 14 seats in the election, winning just about 39 percent of votes cast and ending 11 years of labor rule in the state. Before the poll day on 11 December 1993, Arnold had already sensed the defeat and issued a statement to the effect that there would be consequences for changing governments after such a long time in labor rule. After the election, Arnold himself lost his seat of Ramsay to Mike Rann but gained another seat of Taylor created on the same day. Brown became his successor as premier on 14 December. One of the factors responsible for the loss in the election according to Arnold was Gordon Bilney of federal labor ministry who had written a letter.

=== Leader of the Opposition (1993–1994) ===
After the ALP lost the state elections in South Australia in 1993, Arnold took the post of Leader of the Opposition, and he was appointed Shadow Minister for Economic Development and Multicultural and Ethnic Affairs since 14 December 1993. The opposition leader was unanimously elected after the loss of office. Though Rann denied that he posed any threat to the leadership, both him and Martyn Evans could be potential opponents to Arnold in media coverage. According to Arnold himself, he planned to continue as the leader until1997 when Labor would win the election again and make him the premier once more. In addition, he mentioned that the election victory had ended the fallout from the State Bank scandal and that the situation prior to 1997 depended upon events during the term.

On 11 May and 3 August 1994, a motion was moved in the Legislative Council to establish a Select Committee based on proposals from Arnold's September 1993 ministerial statement, but it was never voted on and lapsed after his retirement. Arnold resigned from parliament on 20 September, officially relinquishing his seat of Taylor on 21 September. Rann succeeded him as Opposition Leader, and the subsequent by-election for Taylor was held the next day, with Trish White retaining the seat for Labor.

== Later life ==
=== Anglicare (1994–2012) ===
After leaving parliament in 1994, Arnold graduated from ESADE in Barcelona, Spain, with a diploma in senior company administration. Later that year, in September, Arnold pursued a career in the humanitarian and community sectors. He worked with Anglicare and World Vision, as chief executive of World Vision Australia from 1997 to 2003, before being appointed Regional Vice President of World Vision International for the Asia-Pacific region in 2003. In parallel with his professional work, Arnold completed a PhD in sociolinguistics at the University of Adelaide in August 2003, with a thesis on Perceptions of Language and Identity in Asturias and their Implications for Language Policy and Development, recognising his contributions to multicultural education and focusing on Spanish language policies, particularly Bable in Asturias.

In October 2006, Arnold became senior director for Board Development and Peer Review at World Vision International, overseeing governance support and peer review programs for World Vision boards and partnerships. In December 2007, the Anglican Archbishop of Adelaide Jeffrey Driver, announced Arnold's appointment as chief executive of Anglicare SA, a role he held from March 2008 to June 2012 before stepping down to pursue ordination in the Anglican priesthood; he was succeeded by Peter Sandeman. He also chaired the Advisory Board of the Research Centre for Languages and Culture at the University of South Australia from 2009 to 2017. In April 2010, he succeeded Greg Crafter as chair of the Don Dunstan Foundation, overseeing a strategic plan focused on youth homelessness, Aboriginal employment, and sex discrimination. Arnold has been an Australia Day Ambassador since 2011.

=== Priesthood (2013–present) ===
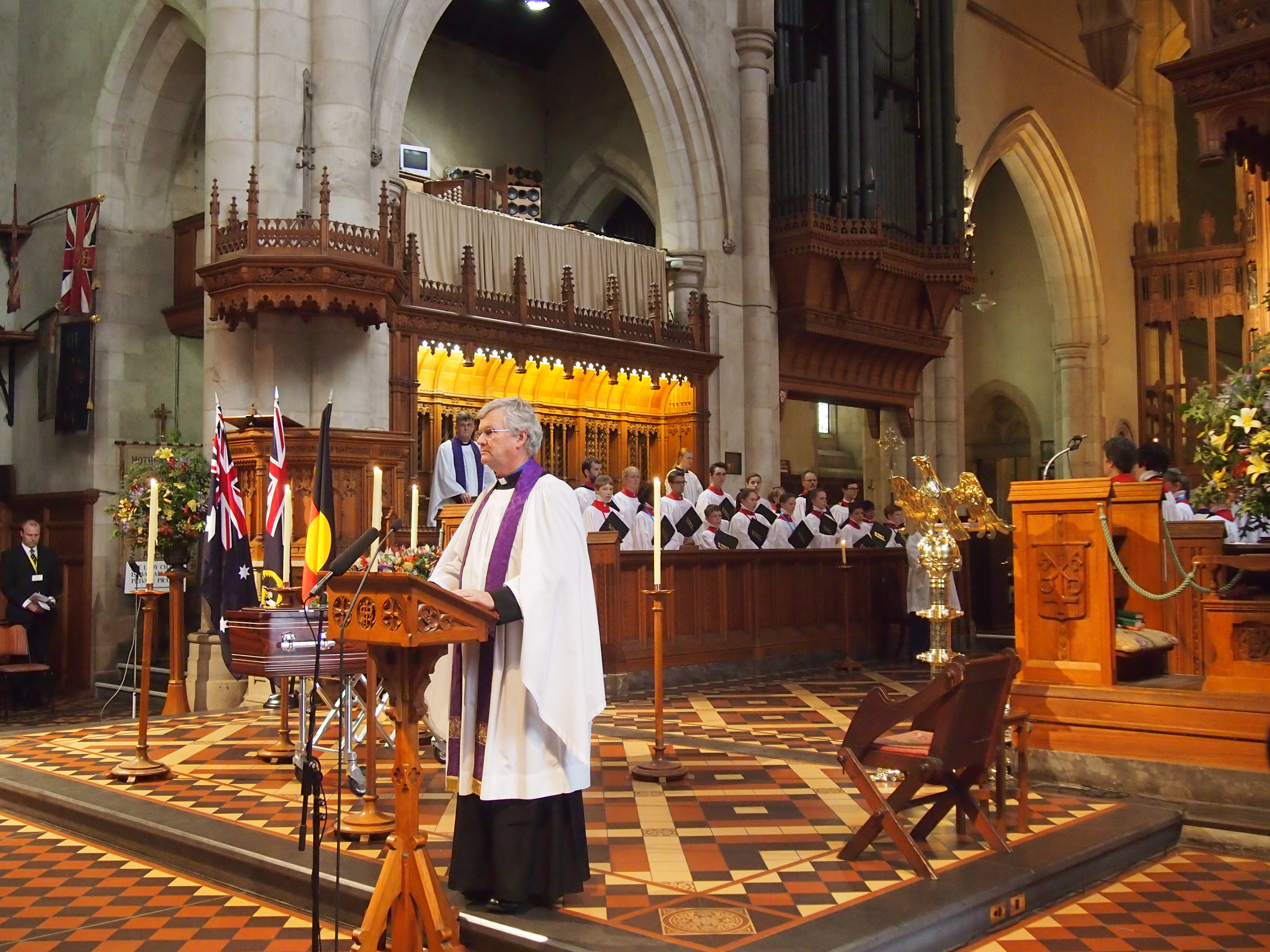
Arnold (standing behind) as Frank Nelson officiates Bannon's funeral, 2015

Arnold was ordained as a deacon in Adelaide in November 2013 and as an Anglican priest at St Peter's Cathedral on 6 December 2014 by the Archbishop of Adelaide. As one of seven deacons elevated to the Order of Priests, he became authorised to perform baptisms, preside over Holy Communion, pronounce Absolution, and give blessings. Arnold described his calling as helping the church articulate Christ's message by serving the hungry, homeless, sick, prisoners, and strangers. From 2014 to 2024, Arnold hosted a weekly radio program on 1079 Life titled Sunday Night with Lynn Arnold. He gave a prayer during Bannon's state funeral at St Peter's Cathedral on 21 December 2015. Arnold also chaired the Crawford Fund's Food for a More Secure World from 2018 to 2024.

Arnold was chair of the Don Dunstan Foundation until June 2020, when Jane Lomax-Smith succeeded him, and he continues on the board as director and as a patron. Additionally, Arnold held the post of reader in public theology at St Barnabas Theological College until 2022. On 2 August 2022, he received a partial Australian Security Intelligence Organisation (ASIO) file revealing that he had been monitored for decades since his anti-Vietnam War activism. The 150-page file contained meeting summaries, newspaper clippings, and rally photographs, with some sections redacted or destroyed. ASIO had monitored him to determine whether he was a communist and ultimately concluded he was not. Arnold expressed surprise that some close friends had reported on him and suspected surveillance continued during his premiership. He described feeling both understanding of national security needs and dismayed by the breaches of trust. Arnold is the patron of the Adelaide Park Lands Association, and has been outspoken in protecting the Adelaide Park Lands from the Malinauskas Government. The University of Divinity appointed the Arnold as its next chancellor for a three-year term commencing on 1 January 2027.

== Personal life ==
Arnold was raised within a Christian home which shaped his early interest in social justice. At university, and through his parents' influence, he was drawn to Quakerism by pacifism, silent worship, and living out the faith from day to day. He then returned to Anglicanism but was still grateful for the spirituality of different Christian traditions and the discipline of private prayer. Arnold is married to Elaine and has five children and eight grandchildren.

== Honours ==
The entitlement for Arnold to be titled "The Honourable" was published in the gazette on 26 May 1994. He received the Centenary Medal in 2001 for his contributions to the Australian community. In 2004, he was appointed an Officer (AO) in the General Division of the Order of Australia in the Queen's Birthday Honours, recognising his service as premier of South Australia, legislator, and his work in development and humanitarian organisations.

Political offices
Preceded by John Bannon	Premier of South Australia; 1992 – 1993	Succeeded by Dean Brown
Preceded by Dean Brown	Leader of the Opposition in South Australia; 1993 – 1994	Succeeded by Mike Rann
Parliament of South Australia
Preceded by Reg Groth	Member for Salisbury; 1979 – 1985	District abolished
New division	Member for Ramsay; 1985 – 1993	Succeeded by Mike Rann
New division	Member for Taylor; 1993 – 1994	Succeeded by Trish White
Party political offices
Preceded by John Bannon	Leader of the Australian Labor Party (South Australian Branch); 1992 – 1994	Succeeded by Mike Rann
