= Electoral district of Salisbury (South Australia) =

Former South Australian state electoral district

Coordinates: 34°46′31″S 138°37′55″E

Salisbury South Australia—House of Assembly
- State: South Australia
- Created: 1970
- Abolished: 1985
- Namesake: Salisbury, South Australia
- Demographic: Metropolitan

Salisbury was an electoral district of the House of Assembly in the Australian state of South Australia from May 1970 to December 1985.

The suburb of Salisbury is currently located in the safe Labor seat of Ramsay.

== Members ==
Member	Party	Term
Reg Groth	Labor	1970–1979
Lynn Arnold	Labor	1979–1985
