= Electoral district of Mawson =

South Australian state electoral district

Mawson South Australia—House of Assembly
- Interactive map of electoral district boundaries from the 2022 state election (Note: The electorate will have no change in boundaries at the 2026 state election.)
- State: South Australia
- Created: 1970
- MP: Jenni Mitton
- Party: Labor
- Namesake: Sir Douglas Mawson
- Electors: 29,275 (2026)
- Area: 5,360 km^{2} (2,069.5 sq mi)
- Demographic: Rural
- Coordinates: 35°13′30″S 138°33′14″E
Electorates around Mawson:
| Flinders | Narungga | Kaurna; Hurtle Vale |
| Southern Ocean | Mawson | Heysen |
| Southern Ocean | Southern Ocean | Finniss |

Mawson is a single-member electoral district for the South Australian House of Assembly. It covers the entirety of Kangaroo Island, and parts of the local government areas of Alexandrina Council, the City of Onkaparinga, and the District Council of Yankalilla. Major localities in the district include Cape Jervis, Kingscote, McLaren Vale, Port Willunga, Aldinga Beach, Sellicks Beach, Willunga and Yankalilla.

== History ==
The electorate was created in the 1969 redistribution, taking effect at the 1970 election. It is named after Sir Douglas Mawson, a geologist and explorer who made several expeditions to Antarctica. For the first three decades of its existence, it was a bellwether seat held by the party of government. This pattern was broken at the 2002 election, when Robert Brokenshire held the seat for the Liberals amidst a Labor election victory. Although it was thought that Brokenshire had established a base in Mawson, it reverted to form at the 2006 election, when Labor candidate and former journalist Leon Bignell won amid that year's massive Labor landslide.

Bignell went on to increase his seat margins at the 2010 and 2014 elections. In both cases, he not only bucked the statewide trend, but also decades of voting patterns in the electorate. The 2016 redistribution ahead of the 2018 election heavily redistributed Mawson from a 5.6 percent Labor seat to a notional 3.2 percent Liberal seat, taking in areas down the coast as far as and including Kangaroo Island. However, Bignell picked up a swing of over four percent to narrowly retain the seat even as Labor lost government; he thus became its second opposition member. In 2022, Bignell achieved a big swing of over 15% to win the primary vote with over 51% and a 13% swing on the two-party preferred margin giving it a 63% two-party preferred margin making it a safe Labor seat.

Bignell temporarily became an independent to sit as Speaker of the South Australian House of Assembly.

== Members for Mawson ==
| Member | Party | Term |
|---|---|---|
| Don Hopgood | Labor | 1970–1977 |
| Leslie Drury | Labor | 1977–1979 |
| Ivar Schmidt | Liberal | 1979–1982 |
| Susan Lenehan | Labor | 1982–1993 |
| Robert Brokenshire | Liberal | 1993–2006 |
| Leon Bignell | Labor | 2006–2024 |
| Leon Bignell | Independent (Speaker) | 2024–2026 |
| Jenni Mitton | Labor | 2026–present |

== Election results ==
2026 South Australian state election: Mawson
| Party | Candidate | Votes | % | ±% |
|---|---|---|---|---|
| Labor | Jenni Mitton | 9,394 | 37.4 | −13.8 |
| One Nation | Tyler Green | 6,554 | 26.1 | +19.5 |
| Liberal | Mike Holden | 4,331 | 17.2 | −10.8 |
| Greens | Lawrence Johnson | 3,220 | 12.8 | +4.0 |
| Legalise Cannabis | Lesley Gray | 1,051 | 4.2 | +4.2 |
| Australian Family | Peter Ieraci | 294 | 1.2 | +0.0 |
| Real Change | Kelly Schumacher | 274 | 1.1 | +1.1 |
| Total formal votes | | 25,118 | 96.5 | −0.5 |
| Informal votes | | 905 | 3.5 | +0.5 |
| Turnout | | 26,023 | 88.9 | −1.1 |
Two-party-preferred result
| Labor | Jenni Mitton | 14,224 | 56.6 | −7.2 |
| One Nation | Tyler Green | 10,894 | 43.4 | +43.4 |
| Labor hold | | | | |
