= Don Hopgood =

Australian politician and teacher (born 1938)

The Honourable Don Hopgood AO
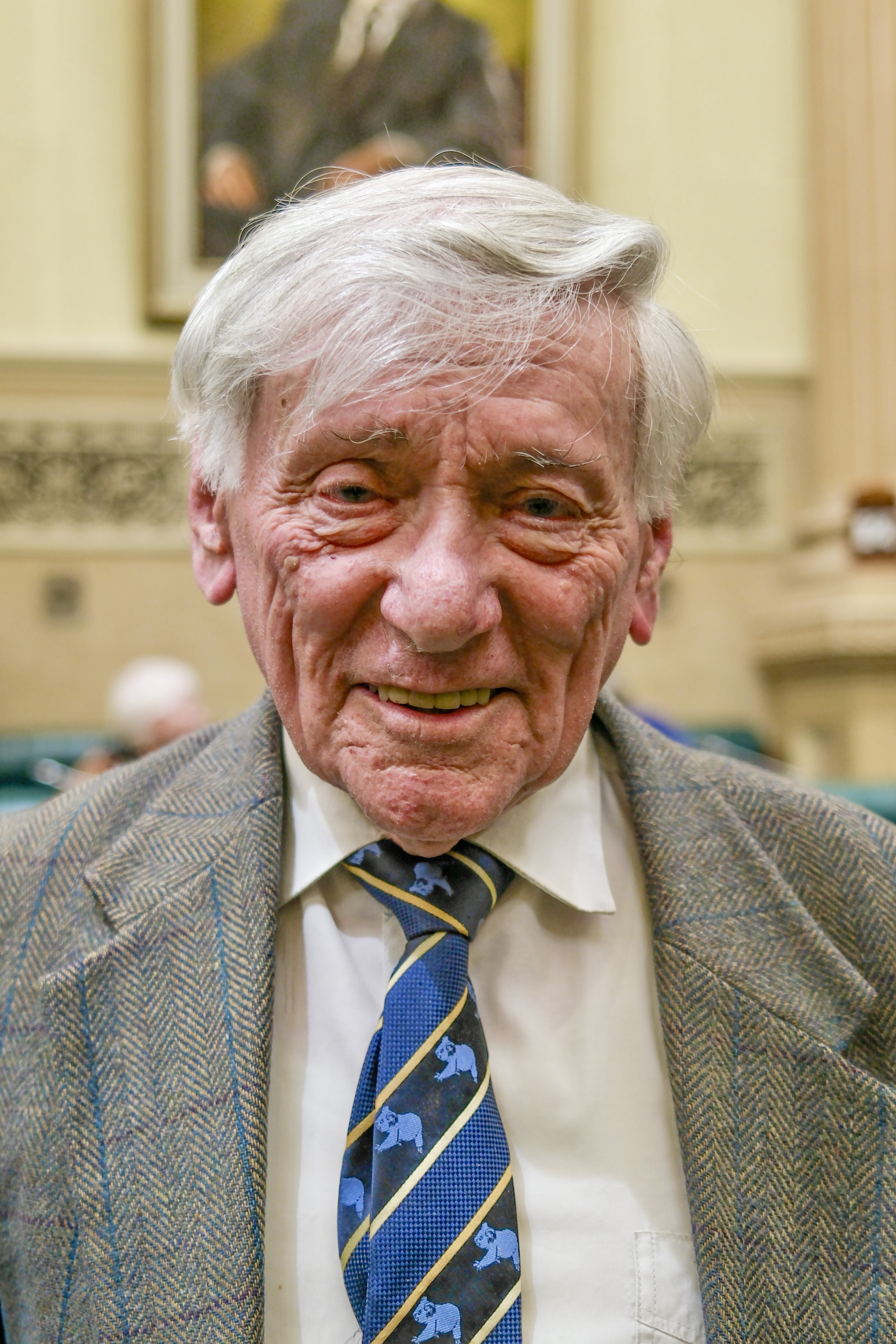
- Hopgood in 2026

Deputy Premier of South Australia
- In office 26 July 1985 – 4 September 1992
- Premier: John Bannon
- Preceded by: Jack Wright
- Succeeded by: Frank Blevins

Deputy Leader of the South Australian Labor Party
- In office 26 July 1985 – 4 September 1992
- Leader: John Bannon
- Preceded by: Jack Wright
- Succeeded by: Frank Blevins

Member of the South Australian Parliament for Baudin
- In office 17 September 1977 – 11 December 1993
- Preceded by: Electorate established
- Succeeded by: Electorate abolished

Member of the South Australian Parliament for Mawson
- In office 30 May 1970 – 17 September 1977
- Preceded by: Electorate established
- Succeeded by: Leslie Drury

Personal details
- Born: Donald Jack Hopgood; 5 September 1938 (age 88) Prospect, South Australia, Australia
- Party: Labor
- Spouse: Helen Medlin (m. 1964; died 2007)
- Children: 3
- Education: Adelaide Teachers' College; Flinders University (PhD; BTh)
- Occupation: Politician; teacher

Donald Jack Hopgood (born 5 September 1938) is an Australian former politician and schoolteacher who served as Deputy Premier of South Australia from 1985 to 1992 under Premier John Bannon. A member of the Australian Labor Party, he represented Mawson from 1970 to 1977 and Baudin from 1977 to 1993 in the South Australian House of Assembly.

Hopgood was born in Prospect, South Australia and attended Adelaide Boys' High School. His education took place in Adelaide Teachers' College where he studied at the University of Adelaide and later worked as a science, mathematics and history teacher. Hopgood joined the Labor Party in 1965 through supporting Hugh Hudson's campaign. He got his doctoral degree in South Australian Labor Politics from Flinders University in 1975.

Hopgood was in the Dunstan government in 1973 when he was appointed Minister of Development and Mines and Minister Assisting the Premier. In 1975, he succeeded Hudson as Minister of Education and he was in office up to 1979. After Labor came back into power in 1982, Hopgood became the Minister for Environment and Planning. He became the Minister of Water Resources and participated in interstate negotiations leading to the formation of Murray–Darling Basin Commission. Hopgood held Health portfolio and left parliament in 1993.

Following his tenure in parliament, Hopgood was the moderator of the South Australian Synod of the Uniting Church in Australia between 1997 and 1999 and was the chairman of the Water Proofing Adelaide Strategy Advisory Committee. He appeared before the Royal Commission into Institutional Responses to Child Sexual Abuse in 2015 in regard to his actions as the education minister where he chose not to dismiss and accepted the resignation of teacher Gregory Knight. In 2025, he received the Key to the City from the City of Onkaparinga.

== Early life and education ==
Hopgood was born on 5 September 1938 in Prospect, South Australia to Jack and Gwen Hopgood (née Bessell). He had a younger brother named Melvyn. In the time of Second World War, he was mostly with his grandparents as his father was serving in Royal Australian Air Force. His maternal grandfather, Fred Bessell, was employed with the Islington Railway Workshops. He was influenced by his Methodist background and Don Dunstan's radio broadcasts about poverty, welfare and electoral boundaries.

He went to Prospect Primary School and Adelaide Boys' High School, where he studied between 1952 and 1956 and received a prize for Physics in his last year. He was the first one in his family who went to university, and he was learning teaching at Adelaide Teachers' College while studying at the University of Adelaide. At first, he pursued science as his course but changed to arts and studied history.

== Teaching career ==
Hopgood started his teaching career at Le Fevre Boys' Technical High School in 1960. Hopgood continued his study of history by way of independent study in 1963 when he shifted his teaching assignment to Whyalla Technical High School. He joined Westminster School in Marion in 1964 and initially taught science and mathematics, then modern history. He received upper second-class honours in history from his thesis on the Lang Labor movement in South Australia.

Hopgood worked actively during Labor's 1965 state election campaign for its candidate, Hugh Hudson, and later joined the party. He served the party as its president, later its secretary of the Brighton sub-branch and assisted in its 1968 campaign of Hudson. He advocated reform of the boundaries and widening the voting rights for the South Australian Legislative Council. In 1968, he resigned from Westminster to accept a scholarship for pursuing doctorate research in South Australian Labor politics from the First World War until the Great Depression at Flinders University. He later received encouragement from Hudson during electoral redistribution to run for pre-selection and stood as Labor's candidate for Mawson.

== Political career ==
=== Entry into parliament and the education ministry (1970–1979) ===
Hopgood was elected as a member of the House of Assembly for Mawson on 30 May 1970. As a backbencher, he served as chairman of the Industries Development Committee while continuing his research for his doctorate degree. On 20 September 1973, Hopgood entered into the first Dunstan ministry as the Minister of Development and Mines and Minister Assisting the Premier. He was responsible for the development of South Australia's northern gas reserves, as well as administering the proposed new city of Monarto, in an effort to curtail urban sprawl in Adelaide.

In 1975, Flinders University conferred the doctorate degree on Hopgood. On 24 June of that year, he succeeded Hudson as Minister for Education. Hopgood was responsible for both education and further education departments. Among other things, he continued to support music education and library expansion program. On 17 September 1977, Hopgood transferred to the newly established electorate of Baudin. He continued in his education portfolio until Labor lost office on 18 September 1979.

An inquiry by the Education Department confirmed the allegations made against Gregory Robert Knight, a teacher at Willunga High School, for sexually abusing his students at school camps. This decision was supported by the Crown Solicitor. A letter dismissing him was signed by Hopgood on 30 May 1978. However, in June of the same year, following advice from the department, he retracted the dismissal and received his resignation. Knight continued to be on the register as a teacher in South Australia. On 13 December 1978, Hopgood gave him a reference written on parliamentary paper in praise of his services as music director to the Noarlunga City Concert Band, in which Hopgood was the president.

=== Opposition, planning and water resources (1979–1989) ===
Opposing the incumbent Liberal government, Hopgood was the spokesperson for Labor on education and later on environment and planning issues. As Labor came back into office under the leadership of John Bannon on 10 November 1982, he was appointed as Minister for Environment and Planning, Minister of Lands and Minister of Repatriation.

As the planning minister, Hopgood set up the committee of review headed by John Hodgson and made amendments to the Planning Act 1982 on its recommendations. He was in favor of maintaining a separate planning regime for Adelaide and favoured increased collaboration with the state and the City of Adelaide for preservation of heritage sites. In the fight against demolition of the Aurora Hotel in 1983, Hopgood had discussions involving the government officials, the developer and those fighting against demolition. The developer gave a promise of a reprieve period of 48 hours during which other options would be considered.

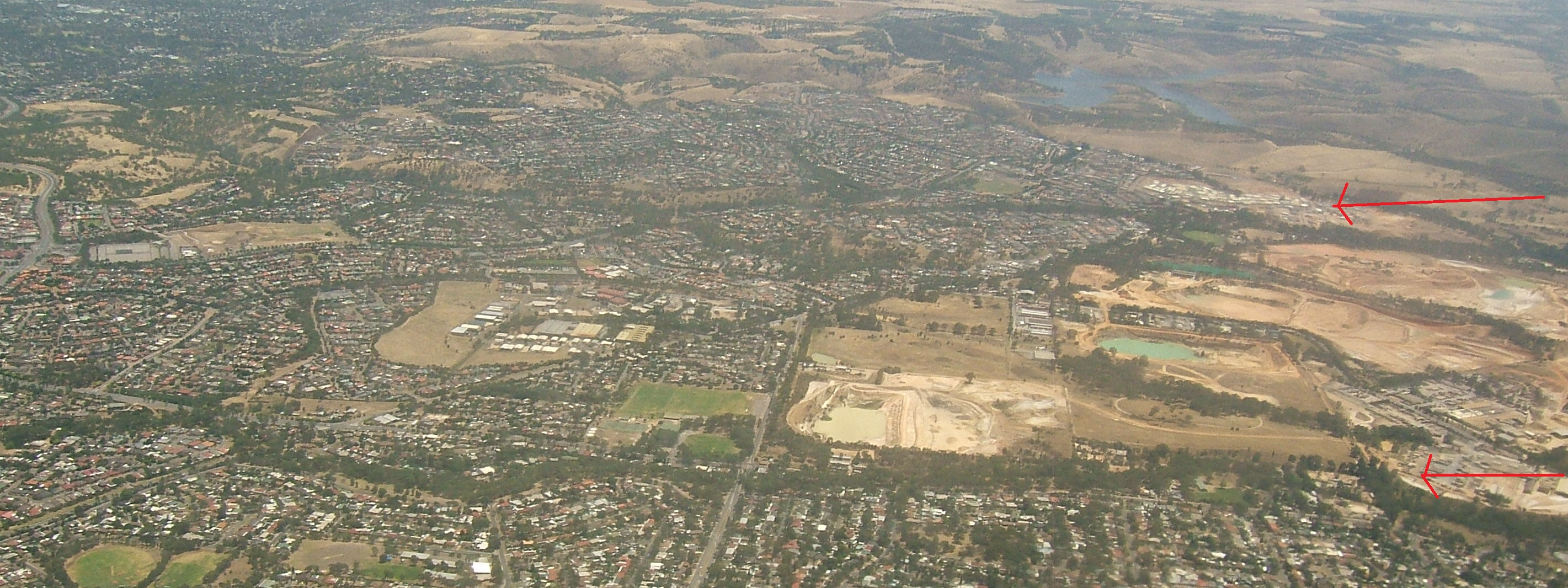
Aerial view of Golden Grove and Greenwith in 2010

In 1984, Hopgood considered the proposals for the development of Golden Grove, including public housing. After a parliamentary inquiry into the joint venture project, he proposed that the ratification bill go ahead unamended, and the bill was enacted on 6 December 1984 as the Golden Grove (Indenture Ratification) Act 1984.

Hopgood succeeded Jack Wright as deputy premier on 16 July 1985. He resigned his roles in Lands and Repatriation but retained his role in Environment and Planning, becoming Minister of Chief Secretary and Minister of Emergency Services as well. He was Minister of Water Resources from 18 December 1985 to 29 July 1988, taking part in negotiations across state lines resulting in the creation of the Murray–Darling Basin Commission. In this capacity, he approved a five-year groundwater management plan for the Angas–Bremer area in 1988, aimed at excessive extraction beyond the natural replenishment of the basin.

Hopgood contributed to the review of pastoral land legislation that resulted in the passing of the Pastoral Land Management and Conservation Act 1989.

=== Health and retirement from parliament (1989–1993) ===
Following brief periods as Minister for Health and Minister for Community Welfare from 4 to 12 August 1988, he resumed both portfolios on 20 April 1989 and took on the portfolio of Minister for the Aged. Family and Community Services was substituted for Community Welfare in his portfolio on 14 December 1989. He also chaired the House of Assembly select committee on the law and practice surrounding death and dying, which was formed in 1990 at the request of Jennifer Cashmore.

Hopgood ceased being the deputy premier on 4 September 1992, and left the ministry on 1 October. He retired from parliament on 31 December 1993.

== Post-parliamentary career ==
(L–R): Mike Smithson, Chris Sumner, Hopgood and Greg Crafter inside Parliament House, Adelaide, on 28 May 2026

Following his exit from parliament, Hopgood enrolled in theological studies. He holds a Bachelor of Theology degree from Flinders University attained in 1997 and was a moderator of the South Australian Synod of the Uniting Church between 1997 and 1999.

Hopgood held the position of chairman of the advisory committee for Water Proofing Adelaide in 2003 that sought the views of the public on the 20-year water strategy for Adelaide and its surroundings. He was an advocate of topping up the water supply in Adelaide through various ways such as wastewater reuse and stormwater recycling and aquifer storage.

At the hearing of the Royal Commission into Institutional Responses to Child Sexual Abuse on 10 November 2015, Hopgood testified about how he managed the case of Knight. He stated that he had planned the recommendation for music employment and accepted the assurance from Knight that he was not planning to teach anymore. In its 2017 report, the commission concluded that Hopgood had neglected the wellbeing of the students in the non-government schools of South Australia by withdrawing the dismissal and failing to inform the Teachers Registration Board. Hopgood acknowledged the conclusion made by the commission. The commission also noted that the law prevailing during that period placed no obligation upon the minister or department to inform the board.

In June 2024, Hopgood was one of the moderators who participated in a forum organised by the Uniting Church South Australia Historical Society at the annual general meeting. In the discussion, he highlighted the pastoral duties of a moderator in enabling congregations to respond to differences in their communities.

== Recognitions and honours ==
The use by Hopgood of the title The Honourable for life was gazetted on 13 December 1979 after having been a minister in the state government. The Onkaparinga City Concert Band awarded Hopgood life membership in 1983.

In the 1995 Australia Day Honours, Hopgood was awarded an Officer of the Order of Australia (AO) for his service to the state parliament, conservation, the environment and community. In 1998, the Onkaparinga City Concert Band awarded Hopgood the Bob Bennett Award. In 2007, Flinders University awarded Hopgood the Distinguished Alumni Award for his service to South Australia through parliament and the church.

On 29 October 2008, Premier Mike Rann unveiled a plaque renaming the Noarlunga College Theatre as the Hopgood Theatre to honor the work that Hopgood and his wife, Raelene, had done in the community. Later, the Onkaparinga City Concert Band performed in the theater oregularly

In 2011, the Southern Jazz Club inducted Hopgood in its Hall of Fame under the Outstanding Contribution category.

On 16 September 2025, the council of the City of Onkaparinga passed a unanimous resolution to confer Hopgood with the Key to the City for his contributions to the local community and the arts. The award was presented by Mayor Moira Were, to Hopgood on 24 October 2025 during the opening ceremony of the renovated Hopgood Theatre.

The Onkaparinga City Concert Band named its training group the Hopgood Wind Ensemble.

== Personal life ==
Hopgood met his wife Helen Raelene Medlin at the youth club at Prospect Methodist Church, which he was leading as president, and Raelene was his vice-president. The couple got married in January 1964, moved to Sturt and had three children. Hopgood and his wife were teachers at Westminster School. His wife Raelene died in 2007.

Hopgood started playing trumpet as a teenager and preached from the age of 18. He played banjo and trumpet for the University of Adelaide jazz band, which played at the 1958 Australian Jazz Convention in Sydney. He joined the Noarlunga City Concert Band in 1976, which changed its name to Onkaparinga City Concert Band later on. Hopgood was its president in 1978 and was its member in 2015.

== Selected publications ==
=== Books and monographs ===
- Hopgood, Don (2006). The Tivoli Swing Shows. South Australian Jazz Archive Monograph Series, no. 1. Appendix by Ian "Splash" Drinkwater.
- Hopgood, Don; Hopgood, Mel (2014). Jazz Voices: Hot Music in the City of Churches. Adelaide: Tabloid.

=== Articles and conference papers ===
- Hopgood, Don (1969). "Lang Labor in South Australia". Labour History (17): 161–173.
- Hopgood, Don (1971). "The view from head office: The South Australian Labor political machine, 1917–1930". Politics. 6 (1): 70–78. doi:10.1080/00323267108401235.
- Hopgood, Don (September 1978). "Article on Continuous Admission". SA School Post. 10 (3): 22.
- Hopgood, Don (1990). "South Australia". Children Australia. 15 (Special Issue 2): 57–58. doi:10.1017/S1035077200002807.
- Hopgood, Don (2001). "Hello Central Give Me X 2350 (One Thursday Afternoon in Late 42)". Journal of the Historical Society of South Australia (29): 58–69.
- Hopgood, Don (2006). "'A Fairyland of a Thousand Twinkling Lights': The Opening of the 'Palais de Danse' on North Terrace in 1920". Journal of the Historical Society of South Australia (34): 17–25.
- Hopgood, Donald J. (September 2012). "Methodists in South Australian Public Life" (PDF). Aldersgate Papers. 10: 85–95.
- Hopgood, Don (2016). "Symmetry, Social Harmony and Jazz". Symmetry: Art and Science (1–4): 62–65.
- Hopgood, Don (February 2024). "Croweaters and the Big V" (PDF). AJAZZ. No. 100. Australian Jazz Museum. pp. 12–13.

=== Australian Dictionary of Biography entries ===
- Hopgood, Donald J. (1983). "Andrew William Lacey (1887–1946)". Australian Dictionary of Biography. Vol. 9. National Centre of Biography, Australian National University. ISBN 978-0-522-84459-7. ISSN 1833-7538. OCLC 70677943.
- Hopgood, Donald J. (1988). "Robert Stanley Richards (1885–1967)". Australian Dictionary of Biography. Vol. 11. National Centre of Biography, Australian National University. ISBN 978-0-522-84459-7. ISSN 1833-7538. OCLC 70677943.

Political offices
| Preceded by Jack Wright | Deputy Premier of South Australia; 1985 – 1992 | Succeeded by Frank Blevins |
South Australian House of Assembly
| New district | Member for Mawson; 1970–1977 | Succeeded by Leslie Drury |
| New district | Member for Baudin; 1977–1993 | District abolished |
