= Susan Lenehan =

Australian politician

Minister of Education
- In office 1 October 1992 – 11 December 1993
- Preceded by: Greg Crafter
- Succeeded by: Rob Lucas

Member of the South Australian Parliament for Mawson
- In office 10 November 1982 – 11 December 1993

Personal details
- Born: 2 November 1943 (age 82)
- Party: Australian Labor Party (SA)

Susan Mary Lenehan (born 2 November 1943) is a former Australian politician. She was a Labor Party member of the South Australian House of Assembly between 1982 and 1993, representing the electorate of Mawson. In 1993 she contested the seat of Reynell, losing to the Liberal party's Julie Greig.

Lenehan held portfolios including Minister for Education, Minister for Planning and Environment. In 2008 she was one of the participants in the Population, sustainability, climate change and water section of the Australia 2020 Summit.
