= Candidates of the 2006 South Australian state election =

This article lists candidates at the 2006 South Australian state election.

== Retiring MPs ==
=== Labor ===
- Ron Roberts MLC

=== Liberal ===
- Dean Brown MP (Finniss)
- Mark Brindal MP (Unley)
- Dorothy Kotz MP (Newland)
- Wayne Matthew MP (Bright)
- John Meier MP (Goyder)
- Julian Stefani MLC

=== Democrats ===
- Ian Gilfillan MLC

== House of Assembly ==
Sitting members are shown in bold text. Successful candidates are highlighted in the relevant colour. Where there is possible confusion, an asterisk (*) is also used.

Electorate	Held by	Labor candidate	Liberal candidate	Democrats candidate	Greens candidate	Family First candidate	Other candidates
Adelaide	Labor	**Jane Lomax-Smith**	Diana Carroll	Richard Pascoe	Nicole Mortier	Bill Villani	Tracey Rice (DFD); Amanda Barlow (NR)
Ashford	Labor	**Stephanie Key**	Kevin Kaeding	Andy Johnstone	Peter Hastwell	Robyn Munro	David Dwyer (ON)
Bragg	Liberal	Andrew Plimer	**Vickie Chapman**	Janet Kelly	Ben Gray	Paul Hannan	
Bright	Liberal	Chloë Fox	Angus Redford	Caroline Siow	Alan (Jack) Robins	Andrew Cole	Trevor Pyatt (DFD)
Chaffey	National	Robert Potter	Anna Baric	Graham McNaughton	Pam Kelly	Rikki Lambert	**Karlene Maywald** (Nat)
Cheltenham	Labor	**Jay Weatherill**	Sue Lawrie	Pam Moore	Margaret Davies	Greg Perry	
Colton	Labor	**Paul Caica**	Tim Blackamore	Anna Tree	Heather Merran	Victoria de Los Angeles	
Croydon	Labor	**Michael Atkinson**	Briony Whitehouse	Kerrin Pine	Teresa Beltrame		
Davenport	Liberal	Gerry Bowen	**Iain Evans**	Bridgid Medder	Adrian Miller	Toni Howard	
Elder	Labor	**Patrick Conlon**	Heidi Greaves	Greg Croke	Mark Arthurson	Roy Brake	
Enfield	Labor	**John Rau**	Sam Joyce	Lucianne Baillie	Des Lawrence	Martin Petho	
Finniss	Liberal	Mary-Lou Corcoran	Michael Pengilly	Kevin Bartolo	Douglas McCarty	Dominic Carli	Kym McHugh (Nat)
Fisher	Independent	Amanda Rishworth	Andy Minnis	Max Baumann	Mark Byrne	Kathryn Rijken	**Bob Such** (Ind)
Flinders	Liberal	John Lovegrove	**Liz Penfold**	John Hunwick	Felicity Wright	Errol Schuster	Hank Swalue (Nat)
Florey	Labor	**Frances Bedford**	Pat Trainor	Catherine Opitz	J Craig McKay	Richard Bunting	
Frome	Liberal	John Rohde	**Rob Kerin**	Marcus Reseigh	Rosalie Garland	John McComb	
Giles	Labor	**Lyn Breuer**	Tina Wakelin		Kieran Turnbull	Cheryl Kaminski	Esmond Vettoretti (NR)
Goyder	Liberal	Aemon Bourke	Steven Griffiths	Steve Jones	Dennis Matthews	Rob Lawrie	Peter Fitzpatrick (ON)
Hammond	Independent	James Peikert	Adrian Pederick	Andrew Castrique	Matthew Rigney	Peter Duff	David Kleinig (ON)
Hartley	Liberal	Grace Portolesi	**Joe Scalzi**	Josh Reynolds	Michelle Wauchope	Lisa Hood	Tim Cousins (DFD)
Heysen	Liberal	Andrew Christie	**Isobel Redmond**	Rosemary Drabsch	John Gitsham	Peter Robins	
Kaurna	Labor	**John Hill**	Tim Flaherty	Graham Pratt	Corrie Vanderhoek	Paul Munn	Jeanie Walker (NR); Barry Becker (Ind)
Kavel	Liberal	John Marshall	**Mark Goldsworthy**	Kathy Brazher-de Laine	Renata Zilm	Tom Playford	Robert Fechner (ON)
Lee	Labor	**Michael Wright**	Peter Rea	Trevor Tucker	Meryl McDougall	Dennis Power	
Light	Liberal	Tony Piccolo	**Malcolm Buckby**	Alan Collinson	Jenni Douglas	Olga Vidoni	Craig Allan (NR)
Little Para	Labor	**Lea Stevens**	Ron Watts	Michael Pilling	Sandra Montgomery	Tony Bates	Rita Hunt (Ind)
MacKillop	Liberal	Philip Golding	**Mitch Williams**	Bob Netherton	Diane Atkinson	Phil Cornish	Darren O'Halloran (Nat)
Mawson	Liberal	Leon Bignell	**Robert Brokenshire**	Ibojka Bauman	Mika Kabacznik-Weller	Roger Andrews	Joanne Harvey (DFD)
Mitchell	Labor	Rosemary Clancy	Jack Gaffey	Jenny Scott	Jeff Williams	Meredith Resce	**Kris Hanna*** (Ind); Michele Colmer (DFD); Travis Gilbert (Ind)
Morialta	Liberal	Lindsay Simmons	**Joan Hall**	Tim Farrow	Peter Fiebig	Jack Button	Darren Andrews (DFD)
Morphett	Liberal	Tim Looker	**Duncan McFetridge**	Keryn Hassall	Damien Uern	John Ewers	
Mount Gambier	Independent	Bradley Coates	Peter Gandolfi	Tony Hill	Robert Mengler	Laura Crowe-Owen	**Rory McEwen*** (Ind); Laura Cunningham (Ind)
Napier	Labor	**Michael O'Brien**	Joe Federico	Scharyn Varley	Terry Allen	Peter Barnes	
Newland	Liberal	Tom Kenyon	Mark Osterstock	Ruth Russell	Graham Smith	Brenda Bates	Josephine Brooks (DFD); Stan Batten (ON); Troy Walker (NR)
Norwood	Labor	**Vini Ciccarello**	Nigel Smart	David Winderlich	Cate Mussared	John Vottari	Rick Neagle (DFD); Patrick Larkin (Ind)
Playford	Labor	**Jack Snelling**	Tom Javor	Ben Howieson	Paul Sharpe	John Doening	
Port Adelaide	Labor	**Kevin Foley**	Anna Micheel	Amy Van Oosten	Anne McMenamin	James Troup	Darren Fairweather (ON); John McGill (Ind)
Ramsay	Labor	**Mike Rann**	Damien Pilkington	Chris Calvert	David Nicks		Colin Wuttke (Ind)
Reynell	Labor	**Gay Thompson**	Gary Hennessy	Yvonne Baillie	William Weller	Geoff Doecke	Marie Nicholls (NR)
Schubert	Liberal	Kym Wilson	**Ivan Venning**	Ian deLaine	Patricia Murray	Phillip Sawyer	
Stuart	Liberal	Justin Jarvis	**Graham Gunn**	Bruce Lennon	Jane Alcorn	Greg Patrick	Simon Cook (NR)
Taylor	Labor	**Trish White**	Linda Caruso	Frances Coombe	Penelope Johnston	Paul Coombe	
Torrens	Labor	**Robyn Geraghty**	Adam Howard	Luke Fraser	Sally Reid	Owen Hood	
Unley	Liberal	Michael Keenan	David Pisoni	Bruce Hogben	Peter Solly	David Kingham	Katharine Annear (DFD)
Waite	Liberal	Diana Gibbs-Ludbrook	**Martin Hamilton-Smith**	Simon Regan	Zane Young	John Queale	
West Torrens	Labor	**Tom Koutsantonis**	Emilio Costanzo	Nicole Prince	Tim White	David Wall	
Wright	Labor	**Jennifer Rankine**	Stephen Ernst	Scott Jesser	Holdern Ward	Malcolm Reynolds	Sarah Rischmueller (DFD)

== Legislative Council ==
Sitting members are shown in bold text. Tickets that elected at least one MLC are highlighted in the relevant colour. Successful candidates are identified by an asterisk (*). Eleven seats were up for election. Labor were defending four seats. The Liberals were defending four seats. The Democrats were defending two seats. No Pokies were defending one seat.

Labor candidates	Liberal candidates	Democrats candidates	Greens candidates	Family First candidates	No Pokies candidates
1. **Carmel Zollo***; 2. **Bob Sneath***; 3. Russell Wortley*; 4. Ian Hunter*; 5. Jon Gee; 6. Brer Adams; 7. Viv Maher	1. **Rob Lucas***; 2. **John Dawkins***; 3. **Michelle Lensink***; 4. Timothy Keynes; 5. Stephen Wade; 6. Ashley Jared; 7. Bob Randall	1. **Kate Reynolds**; 2. Richard Way; 3. Bec Hill; 4. Paul Rowse	1. Mark Parnell*; 2. Clare McCarty; 3. Jake Bugden; 4. Sarah Hanson-Young	1. Dennis Hood*; 2. Trevor Grace; 3. Toni Turnbull; 4. Colin Gibson	1. **Nick Xenophon***; 2. Ann Bressington*; 3. John Darley
Nationals SA candidates	One Nation candidates	Shooters candidates	Dignity for Disabled candidates	Other candidates	
1. Deb Thiele; 2. Ian Willcourt	1. Barbara Pannach; 2. Basil Hille	1. Robert Low; 2. Michael Hudson	1. Paul Collier; 2. Fim Jucha; 3. Charmaine Mahar; 4. Breige Byrne	Jan Vrtielka; **Terry Cameron**; Neil Armstrong; Peter Lewis; Stormy Summers; Andrew Stanko; Michelle Drummond; Paulina Toro	Mick Dzamko; Joanne Fryar; Lisa Crago; Ralph Clarke; J. Danenberg; Laury Bais; Priya Subramaniam
