= Results of the 2014 South Australian state election (House of Assembly) =

South Australian state election, 15 March 2014 House of Assembly << 2010–2018 >>
Enrolled voters	1,142,419				
Votes cast	1,050,359		Turnout	91.94	–0.84
Informal votes	32,503		Informal	3.09	–0.24
Summary of votes by party
Party	Primary votes	%	Swing	Seats	Change
Liberal	455,797	44.78	+3.13	22	+ 4
Labor	364,420	35.80	–1.67	23	– 3
Greens	88,600	8.70	+0.59	0	± 0
Family First	63,575	6.25	+0.87	0	± 0
Dignity for Disability	5,934	0.58	+0.45	0	± 0
National	1,328	0.13	–0.92	0	± 0
FREE Australia	247	0.02	–0.13	0	± 0
Independent	37,955	3.73	–0.97	2	– 1
Total	1,017,856			47	
Two-party-preferred
Labor	478,361	47.00	–1.39		
Liberal	539,495	53.00	+1.39		

This is a list of House of Assembly results for the 2014 South Australian state election.

== Results by district ==
Winning party by electorate.

=== Adelaide ===
2014 South Australian state election: Adelaide
Party	Candidate	Votes	%	±%
Liberal	Rachel Sanderson	10,543	48.7	+4.2
Labor	David O'Loughlin	7,812	36.1	+2.7
Greens	Robert Simms	2,551	11.8	+0.1
Dignity for Disability	Anna Tree	748	3.5	+1.6
Total formal votes		21,654	98.0	+1.8
Informal votes		433	2.0	−1.8
Turnout		22,087	89.1	−0.9
Two-party-preferred result
Liberal	Rachel Sanderson	11,341	52.4	−1.8
Labor	David O'Loughlin	10,313	47.6	+1.8
Liberal hold		Swing	−1.8	

=== Ashford ===
2014 South Australian state election: Ashford
Party	Candidate	Votes	%	±%
Liberal	Terina Monteagle	9,335	43.1	+0.6
Labor	Steph Key	8,597	39.7	−0.3
Greens	Christiana Griffith	2,654	12.2	−0.4
Family First	Robyn Munro	841	3.9	−0.4
FREE Australia	Steve Sansom	247	1.1	+1.1
Total formal votes		21,674	96.9	−0.1
Informal votes		700	3.1	+0.1
Turnout		22,374	92.4	+0.6
Two-party-preferred result
Labor	Steph Key	11,247	51.9	+1.3
Liberal	Terina Monteagle	10,427	48.1	−1.3
Labor hold		Swing	+1.3	

=== Bragg ===
2014 South Australian state election: Bragg
Party	Candidate	Votes	%	±%
Liberal	Vickie Chapman	15,033	65.7	+2.6
Labor	Ella Waters	4,958	21.7	+0.1
Greens	Ami Harrison	2,891	12.6	+0.4
Total formal votes		22,882	98.3	+0.2
Informal votes		400	1.7	−0.2
Turnout		23,282	92.7	+0.3
Two-party-preferred result
Liberal	Vickie Chapman	15,711	68.7	−1.5
Labor	Ella Waters	7,171	31.3	+1.5
Liberal hold		Swing	−1.5	

=== Bright ===
2014 South Australian state election: Bright
Party	Candidate	Votes	%	±%
Liberal	David Speirs	10,780	48.5	+4.6
Labor	Chloë Fox	8,491	38.2	−4.0
Greens	Jamie Ryan	2,081	9.4	+1.5
Family First	Steve Price	852	3.8	+0.9
Total formal votes		22,204	97.8	+0.8
Informal votes		488	2.2	−0.8
Turnout		22,692	93.1	−0.4
Two-party-preferred result
Liberal	David Speirs	11,829	53.3	+3.7
Labor	Chloë Fox	10,375	46.7	−3.7
Liberal gain from Labor		Swing	+3.7	

=== Chaffey ===
2014 South Australian state election: Chaffey
Party	Candidate	Votes	%	±%
Liberal	Tim Whetstone	14,196	64.8	+17.1
Labor	Mahanbir Grewal	3,615	16.5	+9.1
Family First	Yvonne Zeppel	2,891	13.2	+5.7
Greens	Jason Garrood	1,199	5.5	+3.3
Total formal votes		21,901	96.6	−0.3
Informal votes		767	3.4	+0.3
Turnout		22,668	92.2	−1.4
Two-party-preferred result
Liberal	Tim Whetstone	16,454	75.1	−3.3
Labor	Mahanbir Grewal	5,447	24.9	+3.3
Liberal hold		Swing	N/A	

=== Cheltenham ===
2014 South Australian state election: Cheltenham
Party	Candidate	Votes	%	±%
Labor	Jay Weatherill	12,060	55.4	−0.6
Liberal	Jack Batty	6,414	29.5	+5.1
Greens	Rebecca Galdies	1,831	8.4	+2.2
Family First	Alex Tennikoff	1,470	6.8	+1.3
Total formal votes		21,775	96.5	+0.8
Informal votes		786	3.5	−0.8
Turnout		22,561	91.3	−1.5
Two-party-preferred result
Labor	Jay Weatherill	13,993	64.3	−1.8
Liberal	Jack Batty	7,782	35.7	+1.8
Labor hold		Swing	−1.8	

=== Colton ===
2014 South Australian state election: Colton
Party	Candidate	Votes	%	±%
Labor	Paul Caica	10,394	44.8	−1.5
Liberal	Joe Barry	10,363	44.7	+4.7
Greens	Andrew Payne	1,584	6.8	−1.4
Family First	Kym McKay	859	3.7	+0.2
Total formal votes		23,200	97.3	+1.0
Informal votes		656	2.7	−1.0
Turnout		23,856	93.5	−0.1
Two-party-preferred result
Labor	Paul Caica	11,938	51.5	−2.2
Liberal	Joe Barry	11,262	48.5	+2.2
Labor hold		Swing	−2.2	

=== Croydon ===
2014 South Australian state election: Croydon
Party	Candidate	Votes	%	±%
Labor	Michael Atkinson	11,872	57.8	+4.8
Liberal	Glenda Noble	5,462	26.6	+3.3
Greens	Cherie Hoyle	2,342	11.4	+2.6
Family First	Nkweto Nkamba	866	4.2	+0.6
Total formal votes		20,542	96.6	+1.4
Informal votes		716	3.4	−1.4
Turnout		21,258	90.7	−1.9
Two-party-preferred result
Labor	Michael Atkinson	14,156	68.9	+3.5
Liberal	Glenda Noble	6,386	31.1	−3.5
Labor hold		Swing	+3.5	

=== Davenport ===
2014 South Australian state election: Davenport
Party	Candidate	Votes	%	±%
Liberal	Iain Evans	11,581	51.0	+1.5
Labor	Lucie Lock-Weir	6,498	28.6	+4.1
Greens	Stephen Thomas	3,468	15.3	+1.6
Family First	Natasha Edmonds	1,158	5.1	+1.1
Total formal votes		22,705	97.8	+0.4
Informal votes		511	2.2	−0.4
Turnout		23,216	93.4	−0.2
Two-party-preferred result
Liberal	Iain Evans	13,192	58.1	−2.8
Labor	Lucie Lock-Weir	9,513	41.9	+2.8
Liberal hold		Swing	−2.8	

=== Dunstan ===
2014 South Australian state election: Dunstan
Party	Candidate	Votes	%	±%
Liberal	Steven Marshall	10,978	50.0	+3.7
Labor	Jo Chapley	7,881	35.9	+2.1
Greens	Michael Donato	2,465	11.2	−0.5
Dignity for Disability	Rick Neagle	624	2.8	+1.0
Total formal votes		21,948	97.8	+1.4
Informal votes		494	2.2	−1.4
Turnout		22,442	91.3	−0.4
Two-party-preferred result
Liberal	Steven Marshall	11,656	53.1	−1.7
Labor	Jo Chapley	10,292	46.9	+1.7
Liberal hold		Swing	−1.7	

=== Elder ===
2014 South Australian state election: Elder
Party	Candidate	Votes	%	±%
Liberal	Carolyn Habib	8,828	41.8	+2.5
Labor	Annabel Digance	8,350	39.5	−1.8
Greens	Paul Petherick	1,990	9.4	−1.7
Family First	Cosimo Russo	1,035	4.9	+0.3
Dignity for Disability	Nick Schumi	910	4.3	+4.3
Total formal votes		21,113	96.4	+0.1
Informal votes		787	3.6	−0.1
Turnout		21,900	91.9	−0.5
Two-party-preferred result
Labor	Annabel Digance	10,945	51.8	−0.1
Liberal	Carolyn Habib	10,168	48.2	+0.1
Labor hold		Swing	−0.1	

=== Enfield ===
2014 South Australian state election: Enfield
Party	Candidate	Votes	%	±%
Labor	John Rau	9,650	48.5	−2.4
Liberal	Scott Roberts	6,737	33.9	+1.0
Greens	Roger Levi	1,599	8.0	−0.2
Family First	Lisa Hood	1,300	6.5	+0.6
Independent	Andrew Stanko	591	3.0	+3.0
Total formal votes		19,877	96.0	+0.2
Informal votes		832	4.0	−0.2
Turnout		20,709	89.9	−1.4
Two-party-preferred result
Labor	John Rau	11,550	58.1	−0.9
Liberal	Scott Roberts	8,327	41.9	+0.9
Labor hold		Swing	−0.9	

=== Finniss ===
2014 South Australian state election: Finniss
Party	Candidate	Votes	%	±%
Liberal	Michael Pengilly	11,674	52.9	+1.4
Labor	Melanie Smart	5,166	23.4	−6.8
Greens	Moira Jenkins	2,883	13.1	+4.5
Family First	Bruce Hicks	2,361	10.7	+2.1
Total formal votes		22,084	97.1	−0.6
Informal votes		648	2.9	+0.6
Turnout		22,732	92.6	−0.6
Two-party-preferred result
Liberal	Michael Pengilly	14,086	63.8	+2.6
Labor	Melanie Smart	7,998	36.2	−2.6
Liberal hold		Swing	+2.6	

=== Fisher ===
2014 South Australian state election: Fisher
Party	Candidate	Votes	%	±%
Independent	Bob Such	9,038	38.5	+3.6
Liberal	Sam Duluk	8,249	35.1	+7.0
Labor	Jake Neville	4,170	17.7	−8.6
Greens	Malwina Wyra	1,112	4.7	−0.5
Family First	Daryl van den Brink	936	4.0	−0.8
Total formal votes		23,505	97.6	+0.1
Informal votes		582	2.4	−0.1
Turnout		24,087	93.3	−0.3
Notional two-party-preferred count
Liberal	Sam Duluk	13,456	57.2	+6.5
Labor	Jake Neville	10,049	42.8	−6.5
Two-candidate-preferred result
Independent	Bob Such	13,951	59.4	−8.1
Liberal	Sam Duluk	9,554	40.6	+8.1
Independent hold		Swing	−8.1	

=== Flinders ===
2014 South Australian state election: Flinders
Party	Candidate	Votes	%	±%
Liberal	Peter Treloar	14,994	72.0	+14.0
Labor	Mathew Deane	3,214	15.4	−0.1
Family First	Grant Wilson	1,313	6.3	+1.5
Greens	Felicity Wright	1,299	6.2	−0.7
Total formal votes		20,820	97.6	+0.4
Informal votes		505	2.4	−0.4
Turnout		21,325	91.1	−0.1
Two-party-preferred result
Liberal	Peter Treloar	16,480	79.2	+3.0
Labor	Mathew Deane	4,340	20.8	−3.0
Liberal hold		Swing	+3.0	

=== Florey ===
2014 South Australian state election: Florey
Party	Candidate	Votes	%	±%
Labor	Frances Bedford	8,983	43.8	−1.1
Liberal	Damian Wyld	8,317	40.6	+3.0
Family First	Richard Bunting	1,677	8.2	+1.5
Greens	Kim Thomson	1,517	7.4	+0.9
Total formal votes		20,494	96.7	+0.2
Informal votes		708	3.3	−0.2
Turnout		21,202	92.5	−1.2
Two-party-preferred result
Labor	Frances Bedford	10,755	52.5	−1.1
Liberal	Damian Wyld	9,739	47.5	+1.1
Labor hold		Swing	−1.1	

=== Frome ===
2014 South Australian state election: Frome
Party	Candidate	Votes	%	±%
Independent	Geoff Brock	10,342	45.2	+10.1
Liberal	Kendall Jackson	8,217	35.9	−2.7
Labor	Marcus Connelly	2,598	11.3	−7.1
Family First	Wendy Joyce	1,156	5.1	+1.9
Greens	Rob Scott	578	2.5	−0.6
Total formal votes		22,891	97.6	+0.3
Informal votes		566	2.4	−0.3
Turnout		23,457	93.0	−1.8
Notional two-party-preferred count
Liberal	Kendall Jackson		60.8	+9.1
Labor	Marcus Connelly		39.2	−9.1
Two-candidate-preferred result
Independent	Geoff Brock	13,451	58.8	+2.1
Liberal	Kendall Jackson	9,440	41.2	−2.1
Independent hold		Swing	+2.1	

=== Giles ===
2014 South Australian state election: Giles
Party	Candidate	Votes	%	±%
Labor	Eddie Hughes	9,800	51.4	−1.2
Liberal	Bernadette Abraham	7,134	37.4	+8.1
Family First	Cheryl Kaminski	1,196	6.3	+0.3
Greens	Alison Sentance	942	4.9	−7.2
Total formal votes		19,072	97.0	+0.6
Informal votes		581	3.0	−0.6
Turnout		19,653	86.5	−1.6
Two-party-preferred result
Labor	Eddie Hughes	10,877	57.0	−4.9
Liberal	Bernadette Abraham	8,195	43.0	+4.9
Labor hold		Swing	−4.9	

=== Goyder ===
2014 South Australian state election: Goyder
Party	Candidate	Votes	%	±%
Liberal	Steven Griffiths	11,968	53.7	−4.5
Labor	Elyse Ramsay	6,394	28.7	+1.6
Family First	John Bennett	1,633	7.3	+0.1
Independent	Bob Nicholls	1,126	5.1	+5.1
Greens	Graham Smith	744	3.3	−1.8
National	Kim McWaters	416	1.9	+1.9
Total formal votes		22,281	96.2	+0.2
Informal votes		878	3.8	−0.2
Turnout		23,159	93.5	−0.3
Two-party-preferred result
Liberal	Steven Griffiths	14,022	62.9	−2.8
Labor	Elyse Ramsay	8,259	37.1	+2.8
Liberal hold		Swing	−2.8	

=== Hammond ===
2014 South Australian state election: Hammond
Party	Candidate	Votes	%	±%
Liberal	Adrian Pederick	11,469	55.1	−5.0
Labor	Lou Bailey	5,314	25.5	+1.2
Family First	Daniel Gutteridge	1,654	7.9	+0.6
Greens	Damien Pyne	1,458	7.0	−1.4
National	Rachel Titley	912	4.4	+4.4
Total formal votes		20,807	96.8	+0.0
Informal votes		697	3.2	−0.0
Turnout		21,504	92.1	−0.7
Two-party-preferred result
Liberal	Adrian Pederick	13,444	64.6	−3.1
Labor	Lou Bailey	7,363	35.4	+3.1
Liberal hold		Swing	−3.1	

=== Hartley ===
2014 South Australian state election: Hartley
Party	Candidate	Votes	%	±%
Liberal	Vincent Tarzia	10,118	47.3	+4.3
Labor	Grace Portolesi	8,539	39.9	−1.7
Greens	Paul Birkwood	1,804	8.4	+0.9
Family First	David Maegraith	939	4.4	+1.2
Total formal votes		21,400	97.3	+1.2
Informal votes		595	2.7	−1.2
Turnout		21,995	91.9	−0.6
Two-party-preferred result
Liberal	Vincent Tarzia	11,217	52.4	+2.6
Labor	Grace Portolesi	10,183	47.6	−2.6
Liberal gain from Labor		Swing	+2.6	

=== Heysen ===
2014 South Australian state election: Heysen
Party	Candidate	Votes	%	±%
Liberal	Isobel Redmond	12,768	55.5	−2.4
Greens	Lynton Vonow	4,527	19.7	+2.7
Labor	Paul Yiallouros	4,527	19.7	−0.1
Dignity for Disability	Amy Park	1,192	5.2	+5.2
Total formal votes		23,014	97.3	−0.1
Informal votes		630	2.7	+0.1
Turnout		23,644	93.1	−0.7
Notional two-party-preferred count
Liberal	Isobel Redmond	14,619	63.5	−3.0
Labor	Paul Yiallouros	8,395	36.5	+3.0
Two-candidate-preferred result
Liberal	Isobel Redmond	14,040	61.0	−5.5
Greens	Lynton Vonow	8,974	39.0	+39.0
Liberal hold		Swing	N/A	

=== Kaurna ===
2014 South Australian state election: Kaurna
Party	Candidate	Votes	%	±%
Labor	Chris Picton	8,844	43.4	−5.9
Liberal	Ben Caudle	6,233	30.6	−2.9
Greens	Maureen Cullen	2,041	10.0	+1.2
Independent	Kym Richardson	1,899	9.3	+9.3
Family First	Layla Nahavandi	1,347	6.6	+1.2
Total formal votes		20,364	96.6	+0.1
Informal votes		716	3.4	−0.1
Turnout		21,080	91.0	−1.4
Two-party-preferred result
Labor	Chris Picton	11,740	57.7	−1.2
Liberal	Ben Caudle	8,624	42.3	+1.2
Labor hold		Swing	−1.2	

=== Kavel ===
2014 South Australian state election: Kavel
Party	Candidate	Votes	%	±%
Liberal	Mark Goldsworthy	12,116	54.4	−1.2
Labor	Richard Hilton	4,838	21.7	−2.0
Greens	Ian Grosser	3,481	15.6	+2.9
Family First	Darryl Stott	1,854	8.3	+2.9
Total formal votes		22,289	97.1	−0.0
Informal votes		655	2.9	+0.0
Turnout		22,944	92.6	−0.2
Two-party-preferred result
Liberal	Mark Goldsworthy	14,258	64.0	−1.8
Labor	Richard Hilton	8,031	36.0	+1.8
Liberal hold		Swing	−1.8	

=== Lee ===
2014 South Australian state election: Lee
Party	Candidate	Votes	%	±%
Labor	Stephen Mullighan	9,418	41.0	−5.8
Liberal	Liz Davies	8,216	35.7	+1.5
Independent	Gary Johanson	2,581	11.2	+11.2
Greens	Jo Seater	1,794	7.8	−0.2
Family First	Denis Power	686	3.0	−0.7
Independent	Melita Calone	301	1.3	+1.3
Total formal votes		22,996	96.4	+1.1
Informal votes		861	3.6	−1.1
Turnout		23,857	91.9	−1.4
Two-party-preferred result
Labor	Stephen Mullighan	12,530	54.5	−3.2
Liberal	Liz Davies	10,466	45.5	+3.2
Labor hold		Swing	−3.2	

=== Light ===
2014 South Australian state election: Light
Party	Candidate	Votes	%	±%
Labor	Tony Piccolo	9,919	46.2	−0.2
Liberal	Cosie Costa	9,011	42.0	+1.5
Family First	Wendy Rose	1,355	6.3	+2.1
Greens	Terry Allen	1,193	5.6	+0.2
Total formal votes		21,478	97.3	+0.8
Informal votes		592	2.7	−0.8
Turnout		22,070	92.6	−0.4
Two-party-preferred result
Labor	Tony Piccolo	11,334	52.8	−0.0
Liberal	Cosie Costa	10,144	47.2	+0.0
Labor hold		Swing	−0.0	

=== Little Para ===
2014 South Australian state election: Little Para
Party	Candidate	Votes	%	±%
Labor	Lee Odenwalder	10,300	47.0	−4.2
Liberal	Damien Pilkington	7,201	32.9	+2.9
Family First	Lloyd Rowlands	1,997	9.1	−1.8
Greens	Samantha Blake	1,459	6.7	−0.3
Dignity for Disability	Scott Whelan	954	4.4	+4.4
Total formal votes		21,911	95.6	−0.9
Informal votes		997	4.4	+0.9
Turnout		22,908	89.9	−2.8
Two-party-preferred result
Labor	Lee Odenwalder	12,573	57.4	−3.9
Liberal	Damien Pilkington	9,338	42.6	+3.9
Labor hold		Swing	−3.9	

=== MacKillop ===
2014 South Australian state election: MacKillop
Party	Candidate	Votes	%	±%
Liberal	Mitch Williams	13,803	65.1	+5.0
Labor	Terry Soulmatis	3,099	14.6	+2.1
Family First	Bill Pomery	1,602	7.5	+1.7
Independent	Steve Davies	1,503	7.1	+7.1
Greens	Donella Peters	1,212	5.7	+2.3
Total formal votes		21,219	97.1	−0.2
Informal votes		638	2.9	+0.2
Turnout		21,857	92.8	−0.2
Two-party-preferred result
Liberal	Mitch Williams	16,280	76.7	+2.0
Labor	Terry Soulmatis	4,939	23.3	−2.0
Liberal hold		Swing	N/A	

=== Mawson ===
2014 South Australian state election: Mawson
Party	Candidate	Votes	%	±%
Labor	Leon Bignell	9,666	45.0	−0.8
Liberal	Stephen Annells	8,012	37.3	+1.9
Family First	Geoff Doecke	1,944	9.1	+1.4
Greens	Katie Wright	1,843	8.6	+1.8
Total formal votes		21,465	96.9	+1.1
Informal votes		695	3.1	−1.1
Turnout		22,160	92.5	−1.1
Two-party-preferred result
Labor	Leon Bignell	11,925	55.6	+1.0
Liberal	Stephen Annells	9,540	44.4	−1.0
Labor hold		Swing	+1.0	

=== Mitchell ===
2014 South Australian state election: Mitchell
Party	Candidate	Votes	%	±%
Liberal	Corey Wingard	7,995	36.6	+8.1
Labor	Alan Sibbons	7,309	33.5	−0.7
Independent	Kris Hanna	4,006	18.4	−9.4
Greens	Simon Roberts-Thomson	1,473	6.8	+1.6
Family First	Barbara Bishop	1,034	4.7	+0.4
Total formal votes		21,817	96.8	−0.1
Informal votes		711	3.2	+0.1
Turnout		22,528	93.1	−0.9
Two-party-preferred result
Liberal	Corey Wingard	11,161	51.2	+3.6
Labor	Alan Sibbons	10,656	48.8	−3.6
Liberal gain from Labor		Swing	+3.6	

=== Morialta ===
2014 South Australian state election: Morialta
Party	Candidate	Votes	%	±%
Liberal	John Gardner	12,419	54.1	+8.5
Labor	Clare Scriven	7,162	31.2	−8.1
Greens	Scott Andrews	2,033	8.9	+0.9
Family First	Sue Neal	1,357	5.9	+1.5
Total formal votes		22,971	96.9	−0.2
Informal votes		740	3.1	+0.2
Turnout		23,711	93.4	−0.7
Two-party-preferred result
Liberal	John Gardner	13,793	60.0	+7.3
Labor	Clare Scriven	9,178	40.0	−7.3
Liberal hold		Swing	+7.3	

=== Morphett ===
2014 South Australian state election: Morphett
Party	Candidate	Votes	%	±%
Liberal	Duncan McFetridge	12,164	57.7	+3.1
Labor	Tim Looker	5,973	28.3	−3.7
Greens	Matthew Carey	2,128	10.1	+0.9
Family First	Bob Randall	808	3.8	+0.3
Total formal votes		21,073	97.5	−0.3
Informal votes		547	2.5	+0.3
Turnout		21,620	91.1	−1.3
Two-party-preferred result
Liberal	Duncan McFetridge	13,264	62.9	+2.4
Labor	Tim Looker	7,809	37.1	−2.4
Liberal hold		Swing	+2.4	

=== Mount Gambier ===
2014 South Australian state election: Mount Gambier
Party	Candidate	Votes	%	±%
Liberal	Troy Bell	11,100	51.8	+9.3
Independent	Don Pegler	5,872	27.4	−8.8
Labor	Jim Maher	2,338	10.9	−1.5
Family First	Peter Heaven	1,095	5.1	+0.8
Greens	John Baseley	1,031	4.8	+2.5
Total formal votes		21,436	97.2	+0.8
Informal votes		616	2.8	−0.8
Turnout		22,052	92.3	−1.0
Notional two-party-preferred count
Liberal	Troy Bell		71.4	+5.9
Labor	Jim Maher		28.6	−5.9
Two-candidate-preferred result
Liberal	Troy Bell	12,251	57.2	+7.7
Independent	Don Pegler	9,185	42.8	−7.7
Liberal gain from Independent		Swing	+7.7	

=== Napier ===
2014 South Australian state election: Napier
Party	Candidate	Votes	%	±%
Labor	Jon Gee	9,689	47.6	−7.2
Liberal	Robert Leggatt	6,206	30.5	+4.0
Family First	Gary Balfort	2,741	13.5	+3.7
Greens	Sam Miles	1,722	8.5	+2.9
Total formal votes		20,358	95.7	−0.0
Informal votes		906	4.3	+0.0
Turnout		21,264	89.9	−1.4
Two-party-preferred result
Labor	Jon Gee	12,024	59.1	−7.1
Liberal	Robert Leggatt	8,334	40.9	+7.1
Labor hold		Swing	−7.1	

=== Newland ===
2014 South Australian state election: Newland
Party	Candidate	Votes	%	±%
Labor	Tom Kenyon	9,473	42.8	−0.5
Liberal	Glenn Docherty	9,269	41.8	+3.8
Family First	Kate Horan	1,774	8.0	+1.1
Greens	Mark Nolan	1,641	7.4	−0.6
Total formal votes		22,157	96.9	+0.4
Informal votes		700	3.1	−0.4
Turnout		22,857	93.4	−0.7
Two-party-preferred result
Labor	Tom Kenyon	11,394	51.4	−1.2
Liberal	Glenn Docherty	10,763	48.6	+1.2
Labor hold		Swing	−1.2	

=== Playford ===
2014 South Australian state election: Playford
Party	Candidate	Votes	%	±%
Labor	Jack Snelling	11,352	52.5	−1.5
Liberal	Michael Santagata	6,779	31.4	+2.4
Family First	Greg Evitts	2,052	9.5	+2.9
Greens	Danny Carroll	1,426	6.6	+1.2
Total formal votes		21,609	95.8	−0.0
Informal votes		942	4.2	+0.0
Turnout		22,551	91.7	−1.1
Two-party-preferred result
Labor	Jack Snelling	13,533	62.6	−2.0
Liberal	Michael Santagata	8,076	37.4	+2.0
Labor hold		Swing	−2.0	

=== Port Adelaide ===
2014 South Australian state election: Port Adelaide
Party	Candidate	Votes	%	±%
Labor	Susan Close	11,760	51.8	+2.0
Liberal	Brad Vermeer	7,330	32.3	+5.4
Greens	Mark Seater	1,815	8.0	+1.6
Family First	Bruce Hambour	1,783	7.9	+2.1
Total formal votes		22,688	96.6	+0.0
Informal votes		800	3.4	−0.0
Turnout		23,488	91.4	−1.8
Two-party-preferred result
Labor	Susan Close	13,745	60.6	−2.1
Liberal	Brad Vermeer	8,943	39.4	+2.1
Labor hold		Swing	−2.1	

=== Ramsay ===
2014 South Australian state election: Ramsay
Party	Candidate	Votes	%	±%
Labor	Zoe Bettison	11,283	56.1	−1.7
Liberal	Anthony Antoniadis	4,988	24.8	−0.2
Family First	Paul Coombe	2,347	11.7	+2.1
Greens	Brett Ferris	1,483	7.4	+2.8
Total formal votes		20,101	95.1	−0.6
Informal votes		1,041	4.9	+0.6
Turnout		21,142	90.8	−1.3
Two-party-preferred result
Labor	Zoe Bettison	13,742	68.4	+0.5
Liberal	Anthony Antoniadis	6,359	31.6	−0.5
Labor hold		Swing	+0.5	

=== Reynell ===
2014 South Australian state election: Reynell
Party	Candidate	Votes	%	±%
Labor	Katrine Hildyard	10,434	49.7	−2.5
Liberal	Heidi Greaves	6,539	31.1	+0.5
Family First	Nick Zollo	2,294	10.9	+2.2
Greens	Robyn Holtham	1,734	8.3	+0.2
Total formal votes		21,001	95.6	−0.5
Informal votes		965	4.4	+0.5
Turnout		21,966	91.7	−1.5
Two-party-preferred result
Labor	Katrine Hildyard	12,600	60.0	−0.5
Liberal	Heidi Greaves	8,401	40.0	+0.5
Labor hold		Swing	−0.5	

=== Schubert ===
2014 South Australian state election: Schubert
Party	Candidate	Votes	%	±%
Liberal	Stephan Knoll	11,922	54.1	−3.2
Labor	Adam Slobodian	5,180	23.5	+0.6
Family First	Tony Hurn	2,713	12.3	+5.8
Greens	Jasemin Rose	2,221	10.1	+0.9
Total formal votes		22,036	96.9	+0.3
Informal votes		697	3.1	−0.3
Turnout		22,733	94.1	−0.7
Two-party-preferred result
Liberal	Stephan Knoll	14,237	64.6	−3.2
Labor	Adam Slobodian	7,799	35.4	+3.2
Liberal hold		Swing	−3.2	

=== Stuart ===
2014 South Australian state election: Stuart
Party	Candidate	Votes	%	±%
Liberal	Dan van Holst Pellekaan	13,806	65.7	+13.3
Labor	Josh Vines	5,051	24.0	−11.7
Family First	Sylvia Holland	1,128	5.4	+0.8
Greens	Brendan Fitzgerald	1,035	4.9	+0.0
Total formal votes		21,020	97.5	+0.4
Informal votes		550	2.5	−0.4
Turnout		21,570	91.4	−0.6
Two-party-preferred result
Liberal	Dan van Holst Pellekaan	14,812	70.5	+12.8
Labor	Josh Vines	6,208	29.5	−12.8
Liberal hold		Swing	+12.8	

=== Taylor ===
2014 South Australian state election: Taylor
Party	Candidate	Votes	%	±%
Labor	Leesa Vlahos	10,723	51.0	−4.0
Liberal	Alexander Hyde	6,542	31.1	+2.7
Family First	Lenny Jessiman	2,309	11.0	+0.4
Greens	Kirsten Wahlstrom	1,448	6.9	+1.1
Total formal votes		21,022	95.9	+0.1
Informal votes		895	4.1	−0.1
Turnout		21,917	91.3	−1.7
Two-party-preferred result
Labor	Leesa Vlahos	12,940	61.6	−1.0
Liberal	Alexander Hyde	8,082	38.4	+1.0
Labor hold		Swing	−1.0	

=== Torrens ===
2014 South Australian state election: Torrens
Party	Candidate	Votes	%	±%
Labor	Dana Wortley	8,959	43.8	−5.9
Liberal	Michael Manetta	8,111	39.6	+5.0
Greens	Anne Walker	1,853	9.1	+1.0
Family First	Owen Hood	1,552	7.6	−0.1
Total formal votes		20,475	96.6	−0.1
Informal votes		727	3.4	+0.1
Turnout		21,202	91.0	−1.0
Two-party-preferred result
Labor	Dana Wortley	10,958	53.5	−4.7
Liberal	Michael Manetta	9,517	46.5	+4.7
Labor hold		Swing	−4.7	

=== Unley ===
2014 South Australian state election: Unley
Party	Candidate	Votes	%	±%
Liberal	David Pisoni	12,312	55.8	−0.7
Labor	Lara Golding	6,429	29.1	+0.9
Greens	Nikki Mortier	2,481	11.2	−2.2
Dignity for Disability	Joanne Blesing	854	3.9	+3.9
Total formal votes		22,076	98.2	
Informal votes		409	1.8	
Turnout		22,485	91.9	
Two-party-preferred result
Liberal	David Pisoni	13,195	59.8	−2.2
Labor	Lara Golding	8,881	40.2	+2.2
Liberal hold		Swing	−2.2	

=== Waite ===
2014 South Australian state election: Waite
Party	Candidate	Votes	%	±%
Liberal	Martin Hamilton-Smith	12,585	54.8	−0.1
Labor	Rebekah Huppatz	6,239	27.1	−1.3
Greens	Simon Hope	2,639	11.5	−1.4
Family First	Steve Edmonds	868	3.8	+0.5
Dignity for Disability	Cathi Tucker	652	2.8	+2.8
Total formal votes		22,983	97.6	−0.4
Informal votes		575	2.4	+0.4
Turnout		23,558	92.8	−0.3
Two-party-preferred result
Liberal	Martin Hamilton-Smith	14,106	61.4	−0.7
Labor	Rebekah Huppatz	8,877	38.6	+0.7
Liberal hold		Swing	−0.7	

=== West Torrens ===
2014 South Australian state election: West Torrens
Party	Candidate	Votes	%	±%
Labor	Tom Koutsantonis	10,261	49.1	−1.0
Liberal	Serge Ambrose	7,295	34.9	+2.0
Greens	Tim White	2,454	11.7	−0.2
Family First	Tim Leeder	894	4.3	+0.8
Total formal votes		20,904	96.7	+0.1
Informal votes		712	3.3	−0.1
Turnout		21,616	90.5	−1.7
Two-party-preferred result
Labor	Tom Koutsantonis	12,716	60.8	+0.0
Liberal	Serge Ambrose	8,188	39.2	−0.0
Labor hold		Swing	+0.0	

=== Wright ===
2014 South Australian state election: Wright
Party	Candidate	Votes	%	±%
Labor	Jennifer Rankine	9,838	43.6	−4.6
Liberal	Lyn Petrie	8,685	38.5	+1.2
Family First	Mark Potter	1,904	8.4	+1.7
Greens	Tom Lowe	1,441	6.4	+1.0
Independent	Danyse Soester	696	3.1	+3.1
Total formal votes		22,564	96.3	−0.6
Informal votes		856	3.7	+0.6
Turnout		23,420	93.8	−0.0
Two-party-preferred result
Labor	Jennifer Rankine	11,965	53.0	−1.8
Liberal	Lyn Petrie	10,599	47.0	+1.8
Labor hold		Swing	−1.8	

== See also ==
- Candidates of the 2014 South Australian state election
- Members of the South Australian House of Assembly, 2014–2018
