= Results of the 2006 South Australian state election (House of Assembly) =

South Australian state election, 18 March 2006 House of Assembly << 2002–2010 >>
Enrolled voters	1,055,347				
Votes cast	974,190		Turnout	92.31	–1.28
Informal votes	35,029		Informal	3.60	+0.48
Summary of votes by party
Party	Primary votes	%	Swing	Seats	Change
Labor	424,715	45.22	+8.88	28	+ 5
Liberal	319,041	33.97	–6.00	15	– 5
Greens	60,949	6.49	+4.13	0	± 0
Family First	55,192	5.88	+3.24	0	± 0
Democrats	27,179	2.89	–4.60	0	± 0
National	19,636	2.09	+0.64	1	± 0
Dignity for Disabled	3,974	0.42	+0.42	0	± 0
One Nation	2,591	0.28	–2.13	0	± 0
No Rodeo	2,131	0.23	+0.23	0	± 0
Independent	23,753	2.53	–1.72	3	± 0
Total	939,161			47	
Two-party-preferred
Labor	533,290	56.78	+7.71		
Liberal	405,871	43.22	–7.71		

This is a list of House of Assembly results for the 2006 South Australian state election.

== Results by district ==
=== Adelaide ===
2006 South Australian state election: Adelaide
Party	Candidate	Votes	%	±%
Labor	Jane Lomax-Smith	9,247	47.8	+7.4
Liberal	Diana Carroll	6,500	33.6	−8.8
Greens	Nikki Mortier	1,797	9.3	+4.1
Democrats	Richard Pascoe	558	2.9	−3.0
Family First	Bill Villani	517	2.7	+1.2
Dignity for Disabled	Tracey Rice	441	2.3	+2.3
No Rodeo	Amanda Barlow	277	1.4	+1.4
Total formal votes		19,337	96.3	−0.1
Informal votes		749	3.7	+0.1
Turnout		20,086	89.2	−2.5
Two-party-preferred result
Labor	Jane Lomax-Smith	11,640	60.2	+9.2
Liberal	Diana Carroll	7,697	39.8	−9.2
Labor hold		Swing	+9.2	

=== Ashford ===
2006 South Australian state election: Ashford
Party	Candidate	Votes	%	±%
Labor	Steph Key	10,667	53.3	+12.6
Liberal	Kevin Kaeding	5,396	26.9	−10.2
Greens	Peter Hastwell	1,828	9.1	+3.7
Family First	Robyn Munro	1,002	5.0	+2.0
Democrats	Andy Johnstone	928	4.6	−5.0
One Nation	David Dwyer	205	1.0	−0.6
Total formal votes		20,026	96.0	−0.5
Informal votes		834	4.0	+0.5
Turnout		20,860	91.3	−1.4
Two-party-preferred result
Labor	Steph Key	13,230	66.1	+12.4
Liberal	Kevin Kaeding	8,853	33.9	−12.4
Labor hold		Swing	+12.4	

=== Bragg ===
2006 South Australian state election: Bragg
Party	Candidate	Votes	%	±%
Liberal	Vickie Chapman	11,143	55.9	−6.0
Labor	Andrew Plimer	5,310	26.6	+5.6
Greens	Ben Gray	1,854	9.3	+9.3
Democrats	Janet Kelly	864	4.3	−6.3
Family First	Paul Hannan	769	3.9	+1.2
Total formal votes		19,940	97.7	−0.2
Informal votes		473	2.3	+0.2
Turnout		20,413	91.7	−1.3
Two-party-preferred result
Liberal	Vickie Chapman	12,525	62.8	−6.8
Labor	Andrew Plimer	7,415	37.2	+6.8
Liberal hold		Swing	−6.8	

=== Bright ===
2006 South Australian state election: Bright
Party	Candidate	Votes	%	±%
Labor	Chloë Fox	10,126	50.2	+16.9
Liberal	Angus Redford	6,949	34.4	−10.2
Greens	Allan Robins	1,315	6.5	+1.8
Family First	Andrew Cole	905	4.5	+1.6
Dignity for Disabled	Trevor Pyatt	492	2.4	+2.4
Democrats	Caroline Siow	395	2.0	−6.2
Total formal votes		20,182	97.1	+0.2
Informal votes		600	2.9	−0.2
Turnout		20,782	92.6	−1.5
Two-party-preferred result
Labor	Chloë Fox	11,983	59.4	+14.4
Liberal	Angus Redford	8,199	40.6	−14.4
Labor gain from Liberal		Swing	+14.4	

=== Chaffey ===
2006 South Australian state election: Chaffey
Party	Candidate	Votes	%	±%
National	Karlene Maywald	10,358	53.2	+4.0
Liberal	Anna Baric	5,498	28.2	−3.2
Labor	Robert Potter	1,914	9.8	−2.2
Family First	Rikki Lambert	970	5.0	+5.0
Greens	Pam Kelly	475	2.4	+2.4
Democrats	Graham McNaughton	271	1.4	−2.6
Total formal votes		19,486	96.5	−1.0
Informal votes		699	3.5	+1.0
Turnout		20,185	92.3	−1.2
Notional two-party-preferred count
Liberal	Anna Baric	13,994	71.8	
Labor	Robert Potter	5,492	28.2	
Two-candidate-preferred result
National	Karlene Maywald	13,101	67.2	+3.2
Liberal	Anna Baric	6,385	32.8	−3.2
National hold		Swing	+3.2	

=== Cheltenham ===
2006 South Australian state election: Cheltenham
Party	Candidate	Votes	%	±%
Labor	Jay Weatherill	12,020	62.7	+14.1
Liberal	Sue Lawrie	3,259	17.0	−6.8
Family First	Greg Perry	1,895	9.9	+9.9
Greens	Margaret Davies	1,140	6.0	+3.0
Democrats	Pam Moore	842	4.4	−2.4
Total formal votes		19,156	95.7	+1.6
Informal votes		866	4.3	−1.6
Turnout		20,022	91.4	−1.6
Two-party-preferred result
Labor	Jay Weatherill	14,444	75.4	+8.7
Liberal	Sue Lawrie	4,712	24.6	−8.7
Labor hold		Swing	+8.7	

=== Colton ===
2006 South Australian state election: Colton
Party	Candidate	Votes	%	±%
Labor	Paul Caica	11,866	58.2	+16.5
Liberal	Tim Blackamore	5,952	29.2	−9.6
Greens	Heather Merran	1,191	5.8	+0.3
Family First	Victoria de Los Angeles	820	4.0	+1.6
Democrats	Anna Tree	560	2.7	−1.7
Total formal votes		20.389	96.6	+1.1
Informal votes		718	3.4	−1.1
Turnout		21,107	93.5	−0.8
Two-party-preferred result
Labor	Paul Caica	13,522	66.3	+11.7
Liberal	Tim Blackamore	6,867	33.7	−11.7
Labor hold		Swing	+11.7	

=== Croydon ===
2006 South Australian state election: Croydon
Party	Candidate	Votes	%	±%
Labor	Michael Atkinson	13,074	67.1	+6.8
Liberal	Briony Whitehouse	3,762	19.3	−5.4
Greens	Teresa Beltrame	1,869	9.6	+9.6
Democrats	Kerrin Pine	781	4.0	−3.9
Total formal votes		19,486	96.4	
Informal votes		721	3.6	
Turnout		20,207	91.4	
Two-party-preferred result
Labor	Michael Atkinson	14,808	76.0	+6.9
Liberal	Briony Whitehouse	4,678	24.0	−6.9
Labor hold		Swing	+6.9	

=== Davenport ===
2006 South Australian state election: Davenport
Party	Candidate	Votes	%	±%
Liberal	Iain Evans	9,579	48.5	−3.3
Labor	Gerry Bowen	6,111	30.9	+8.1
Greens	Adrian Miller	2,250	11.4	+11.4
Democrats	Bridgid Medder	927	4.7	−12.1
Family First	Toni Howard	897	4.5	+4.5
Total formal votes		19,764	97.7	+0.0
Informal votes		474	2.3	+0.0
Turnout		20,238	92.9	−1.2
Two-party-preferred result
Liberal	Iain Evans	11,143	56.4	−5.1
Labor	Gerry Bowen	8,621	43.6	+5.1
Liberal hold		Swing	−5.1	

=== Elder ===
2006 South Australian state election: Elder
Party	Candidate	Votes	%	±%
Labor	Patrick Conlon	10,618	55.2	+11.6
Liberal	Heidi Greaves	5,564	28.9	−9.1
Greens	Mark Arthurson	1,396	7.3	+3.4
Family First	Roy Brake	1,081	5.6	+1.5
Democrats	Greg Croke	564	2.9	−3.8
Total formal votes		19,223	95.9	+0.1
Informal votes		818	4.1	−0.1
Turnout		20,041	92.1	−1.4
Two-party-preferred result
Labor	Patrick Conlon	12,476	64.9	+11.2
Liberal	Heidi Greaves	6,747	35.1	−11.2
Labor hold		Swing	+11.2	

=== Enfield ===
2006 South Australian state election: Enfield
Party	Candidate	Votes	%	±%
Labor	John Rau	12,185	63.4	+23.5
Liberal	Sam Joyce	4,071	21.2	−3.3
Greens	Des Lawrence	1,190	6.2	+6.0
Family First	Martin Petho	1,094	5.7	+0.5
Democrats	Lucianne Baillie	673	3.5	−2.6
Total formal votes		19,213	96.2	
Informal votes		796	3.8	
Turnout		20,009	90.5	
Two-party-preferred result
Labor	John Rau	14,310	74.5	+8.9
Liberal	Sam Joyce	4,903	25.5	−8.9
Labor hold		Swing	+8.9	

=== Finniss ===
2006 South Australian state election: Finniss
Party	Candidate	Votes	%	±%
Liberal	Michael Pengilly	7,682	37.1	−18.8
Labor	Mary-Lou Corcoran	6,098	29.5	+7.8
National	Kym McHugh	3,622	17.5	+17.5
Greens	Douglas McCarty	1,586	7.7	+2.4
Family First	Dominic Carli	1,168	5.6	+0.5
Democrats	Kevin Bartolo	544	2.6	−6.2
Total formal votes		20,700	96.5	
Informal votes		674	3.5	
Turnout		21,374	93.5	
Two-party-preferred result
Liberal	Michael Pengilly	11,701	56.5	−9.1
Labor	Mary-Lou Corcoran	8,999	43.5	+9.1
Liberal hold		Swing	−9.1	

=== Fisher ===
2006 South Australian state election: Fisher
Party	Candidate	Votes	%	±%
Independent	Bob Such	9,212	45.2	+11.7
Labor	Amanda Rishworth	5,373	26.4	+4.3
Liberal	Andy Minnis	3,774	18.5	−12.8
Family First	Kathryn Rijken	1,037	5.1	+1.3
Greens	Mark Byrne	699	3.4	+3.4
Democrats	Max Baumann	291	1.4	−5.2
Total formal votes		20,386	97.0	−0.1
Informal votes		631	3.0	+0.1
Turnout		21,017	93.3	−1.0
Notional two-party-preferred count
Labor	Amanda Rishworth	12,110	59.4	+15.1
Liberal	Andy Minnis	8,276	40.6	−15.1
Two-candidate-preferred result
Independent	Bob Such	13,590	66.7	+4.6
Labor	Amanda Rishworth	6,796	33.3	+33.3
Independent hold		Swing	N/A	

=== Flinders ===
2006 South Australian state election: Flinders
Party	Candidate	Votes	%	±%
Liberal	Liz Penfold	10,052	53.2	−12.1
National	Hank Swalue	4,596	24.3	+15.1
Labor	John Lovegrove	2,380	12.6	−3.6
Family First	Errol Schuster	785	4.2	+4.2
Greens	Felicity Wright	773	4.1	+4.1
Democrats	John Hunwick	316	1.7	−4.4
Total formal votes		18,902	97.6	−0.6
Informal votes		473	2.4	+0.6
Turnout		19,375	91.3	−1.6
Notional two-party-preferred count
Liberal	Liz Penfold	14,839	78.5	+1.1
Labor	John Lovegrove	4,063	21.5	−1.1
Two-candidate-preferred result
Liberal	Liz Penfold	11,358	60.1	−18.3
National	Hank Swalue	7,544	39.9	+39.9
Liberal hold		Swing	N/A	

=== Florey ===
2006 South Australian state election: Florey
Party	Candidate	Votes	%	±%
Labor	Frances Bedford	10,042	52.9	+9.7
Liberal	Pat Trainor	5,811	30.6	−6.0
Family First	Richard Bunting	1,410	7.4	+0.7
Greens	Craig McKay	1,083	5.7	+2.1
Democrats	Catherine Opitz	636	3.4	−3.5
Total formal votes		20,507	96.3	−0.9
Informal votes		734	3.7	+0.9
Turnout		21,241	93.3	−0.8
Two-party-preferred result
Labor	Frances Bedford	11,787	62.1	+8.5
Liberal	Pat Trainor	7,195	37.9	−8.5
Labor hold		Swing	+8.5	

=== Frome ===
2006 South Australian state election: Frome
Party	Candidate	Votes	%	±%
Liberal	Rob Kerin	9,655	48.10	−9.48
Labor	John Rohde	8,237	41.04	+5.88
Family First	John McComb	1,038	5.17	+5.17
Greens	Rosalie Garland	750	3.74	+3.74
Democrats	Marcus Reseigh	393	1.96	−2.22
Total formal votes		20,073	96.91	−1.35
Informal votes		640	3.09	+1.35
Turnout		20,713	94.23	−1.08
Two-party-preferred result
Liberal	Rob Kerin	10,721	53.41	−8.05
Labor	John Rohde	9,352	46.59	+8.05
Liberal hold		Swing	−8.05	

=== Giles ===
2006 South Australian state election: Giles
Party	Candidate	Votes	%	±%
Labor	Lyn Breuer	11,121	58.2	+8.9
Liberal	Tina Wakelin	5,775	30.2	+0.3
Family First	Cheryl Kaminski	1,106	5.8	+5.8
Greens	Kieran Turnbull	854	4.5	+4.5
No Rodeo	Esmond Vettoretti	257	1.3	+1.3
Total formal votes		19,113	96.6	−0.7
Informal votes		677	3.4	+0.7
Turnout		19,790	86.5	−0.6
Two-party-preferred result
Labor	Lyn Breuer	12,317	64.4	+4.7
Liberal	Tina Wakelin	6,796	35.6	−4.7
Labor hold		Swing	+4.7	

=== Goyder ===
2006 South Australian state election: Goyder
Party	Candidate	Votes	%	±%
Liberal	Steven Griffiths	10,310	50.1	−1.2
Labor	Aemon Bourke	6,709	32.6	+9.3
Family First	Robert Lawrie	1,558	7.6	+3.0
Greens	Dennis Matthews	928	4.5	+4.5
One Nation	Peter Fitzpatrick	552	2.7	−0.7
Democrats	Stephen Jones	523	2.5	−3.8
Total formal votes		20,580	95.6	
Informal votes		904	4.4	
Turnout		21,484	94.6	
Two-party-preferred result
Liberal	Steven Griffiths	12,169	59.1	−7.1
Labor	Aemon Bourke	8,411	40.9	+7.1
Liberal hold		Swing	−7.1	

=== Hammond ===
2006 South Australian state election: Hammond
Party	Candidate	Votes	%	±%
Liberal	Adrian Pederick	10,039	49.0	+7.8
Labor	James Peikert	5,500	26.8	+9.6
Family First	Peter Duff	1,907	9.3	+9.3
Greens	Matt Rigney	1,476	7.2	+7.2
One Nation	David Kleinig	845	4.1	+0.0
Democrats	Andrew Castrique	739	3.6	−2.0
Total formal votes		20,776	96.0	−1.6
Informal votes		863	4.0	+1.6
Turnout		21,369	93.3	−1.3
Two-party-preferred result
Liberal	Adrian Pederick	12,716	62.0	+14.1
Labor	James Peikert	7,790	38.0	+4.2
Liberal gain from Independent		Swing	N/A	

=== Hartley ===
2006 South Australian state election: Hartley
Party	Candidate	Votes	%	±%
Labor	Grace Portolesi	8,716	45.0	+6.0
Liberal	Joe Scalzi	7,651	39.5	−4.1
Greens	Michelle Wauchope	1,289	6.7	+2.5
Family First	Lisa Hood	814	4.2	−0.4
Democrats	Josh Reynolds	562	2.9	−3.7
Dignity for Disabled	Tim Cousins	323	1.7	+1.7
Total formal votes		19,355	96.3	+0.0
Informal votes		752	3.7	+0.0
Turnout		20,107	92.5	−0.4
Two-party-preferred result
Labor	Grace Portolesi	10,564	54.6	+5.9
Liberal	Joe Scalzi	8,791	45.4	−5.9
Labor gain from Liberal		Swing	+5.9	

=== Heysen ===
2006 South Australian state election: Heysen
Party	Candidate	Votes	%	±%
Liberal	Isobel Redmond	8,683	43.9	−2.1
Labor	Andrew Christie	5,553	28.1	+9.8
Greens	John Gitsham	3,508	17.7	+8.9
Democrats	Rosemary Drabsch	1,044	5.3	−11.0
Family First	Peter Robins	996	5.0	+1.5
Total formal votes		19,784	97.3	−0.1
Informal votes		539	2.7	+0.1
Turnout		20,323	92.8	−1.3
Two-party-preferred result
Liberal	Isobel Redmond	10,492	53.0	−1.0
Labor	Andrew Christie	9,292	47.0	+47.0
Liberal hold		Swing	N/A	

=== Kaurna ===
2006 South Australian state election: Kaurna
Party	Candidate	Votes	%	±%
Labor	John Hill	11,827	60.2	+15.0
Liberal	Tim Flaherty	4,036	20.5	−6.6
Greens	Corrie Vanderhoek	1,444	7.3	+1.9
Family First	Paul Munn	1,328	6.8	+2.7
Democrats	Graham Pratt	423	2.2	−3.6
Independent	Barry Becker	299	1.5	+1.5
No Rodeo	Jeanie Walker	291	1.5	+1.5
Total formal votes		19,648	95.4	
Informal votes		884	4.6	
Turnout		20,532	92.3	
Two-party-preferred result
Labor	John Hill	14,153	72.0	+11.0
Liberal	Tim Flaherty	5,495	28.0	−11.0
Labor hold		Swing	+11.0	

=== Kavel ===
2006 South Australian state election: Kavel
Party	Candidate	Votes	%	±%
Liberal	Mark Goldsworthy	8,590	43.9	−0.4
Labor	John Marshall	4,868	24.9	+6.8
Family First	Tom Playford	3,081	15.7	+15.5
Greens	Renata Zilm	1,951	10.0	+4.5
Democrats	Kathy Brazher-De Laine	709	3.6	−5.9
One Nation	Robert Fechner	373	1.9	−0.1
Total formal votes		19,572	96.5	
Informal votes		644	3.5	
Turnout		20,216	91.9	
Two-party-preferred result
Liberal	Mark Goldsworthy	11,624	59.4	+6.5
Labor	John Marshall	7,948	40.6	+40.6
Liberal hold		Swing	N/A	

=== Lee ===
2006 South Australian state election: Lee
Party	Candidate	Votes	%	±%
Labor	Michael Wright	11,785	58.6	+10.8
Liberal	Peter Rea	5,269	26.2	−8.3
Greens	Meryl McDougall	1,537	7.6	+2.2
Family First	Denis Power	920	4.6	+4.4
Democrats	Trevor Tucker	603	3.0	−2.5
Total formal votes		20,114	96.6	
Informal votes		708	3.4	
Turnout		20,822	93.0	
Two-party-preferred result
Labor	Michael Wright	13,938	69.3	+9.8
Liberal	Peter Rea	6,176	30.7	−9.8
Labor hold		Swing	+9.8	

=== Light ===
2006 South Australian state election: Light
Party	Candidate	Votes	%	±%
Labor	Tony Piccolo	9,217	44.6	+5.5
Liberal	Malcolm Buckby	8,217	39.7	−3.9
Family First	Olga Vidoni	1,403	6.8	+2.3
Greens	Jenni Douglas	1,027	5.0	+2.1
No Rodeo	Craig Allan	445	2.2	+2.2
Democrats	Alan Collinson	370	1.8	−3.7
Total formal votes		20,679	96.1	−0.5
Informal votes		835	3.9	+0.5
Turnout		21,514	92.5	−2.0
Two-party-preferred result
Labor	Tony Piccolo	10,768	52.1	+4.9
Liberal	Malcolm Buckby	9,911	47.9	−4.9
Labor gain from Liberal		Swing	+4.9	

=== Little Para ===
2006 South Australian state election: Little Para
Party	Candidate	Votes	%	±%
Labor	Lea Stevens	11,084	55.7	+11.0
Liberal	Ron Watts	4,956	24.9	−10.0
Family First	Tony Bates	1,759	8.8	+1.3
Greens	Sandy Montgomery	912	4.6	+4.6
Independent	Rita Hunt	710	3.6	+3.6
Democrats	Michael Pilling	486	2.4	−4.6
Total formal votes		19,907	95.8	
Informal votes		864	4.2	
Turnout		20,771	92.5	
Two-party-preferred result
Labor	Lea Stevens	13,285	66.7	+9.5
Liberal	Ron Watts	6,622	33.3	−9.5
Labor hold		Swing	+9.5	

=== MacKillop ===
2006 South Australian state election: MacKillop
Party	Candidate	Votes	%	±%
Liberal	Mitch Williams	12,085	59.9	+7.8
Labor	Phil Golding	4,277	21.2	+7.7
Family First	Philip Cornish	1,402	7.0	+7.0
National	Darren O'Halloran	1,060	5.3	+0.6
Greens	Diane Atkinson	838	4.2	+4.2
Democrats	Bob Netherton	497	2.5	+0.5
Total formal votes		20,159	97.0	
Informal votes		623	3.0	
Turnout		20,782	83.1	
Two-party-preferred result
Liberal	Mitch Williams	14,553	72.2	+1.9
Labor	Phil Golding	5,606	27.8	−1.9
Liberal hold		Swing	+1.9	

=== Mawson ===
2006 South Australian state election: Mawson
Party	Candidate	Votes	%	±%
Labor	Leon Bignell	8,886	43.8	+7.0
Liberal	Robert Brokenshire	8,087	39.9	−3.8
Family First	Roger Andrews	1,330	6.6	+0.0
Greens	Mika Kabacznik-Weller	1,019	5.0	+5.0
Democrats	Ibojka Baumann	476	2.3	−6.2
Dignity for Disabled	Joanne Harvey	469	2.3	+2.3
Total formal votes		20,267	96.2	−0.7
Informal votes		809	3.8	+0.7
Turnout		21,076	93.3	−1.3
Two-party-preferred result
Labor	Leon Bignell	10,572	52.2	+5.7
Liberal	Robert Brokenshire	9,695	47.8	−5.7
Labor gain from Liberal		Swing	+5.7	

=== Mitchell ===
2006 South Australian state election: Mitchell
Party	Candidate	Votes	%	±%
Labor	Rosemary Clancy	8,106	41.0	−2.1
Independent	Kris Hanna	4,872	24.6	+24.6
Liberal	Jack Gaffey	4,094	20.7	−17.4
Family First	Meredith Resce	1,062	5.4	+0.7
Greens	Jeffrey Williams	665	3.4	+3.4
Dignity for Disabled	Michele Colmer	438	2.2	+2.2
Democrats	Jenny Scott	344	1.7	−6.4
Independent	Travis Gilbert	185	0.9	+0.9
Total formal votes		19,766	95.4	−1.2
Informal votes		953	4.6	+1.2
Turnout		20,719	93.2	−1.1
Notional two-party-preferred count
Labor	Rosemary Clancy	12,885	65.2	+10.5
Liberal	Jack Gaffey	6,881	34.8	−10.5
Two-candidate-preferred result
Independent	Kris Hanna	9,997	50.6	+50.6
Labor	Rosemary Clancy	9,769	49.4	−5.3
Independent gain from Labor		Swing	N/A	

=== Morialta ===
2006 South Australian state election: Morialta
Party	Candidate	Votes	%	±%
Labor	Lindsay Simmons	9,762	47.7	+12.9
Liberal	Joan Hall	7,211	35.2	−8.6
Greens	Peter Fiebig	1,296	6.3	+6.3
Family First	Jack Button	1,174	5.7	+0.4
Democrats	Tim Farrow	606	3.0	−7.4
Dignity for Disabled	Darren Andrews	418	2.0	+2.0
Total formal votes		20,467	96.4	+0.9
Informal votes		774	3.6	−0.9
Turnout		21,241	93.3	−0.8
Two-party-preferred result
Labor	Lindsay Simmons	11,859	57.9	+12.0
Liberal	Joan Hall	8,608	42.1	−12.0
Labor gain from Liberal		Swing	+12.0	

=== Morphett ===
2006 South Australian state election: Morphett
Party	Candidate	Votes	%	±%
Liberal	Duncan McFetridge	10,385	49.2	−5.4
Labor	Tim Looker	7,604	36.0	+5.0
Greens	Damien Uern	1,594	7.6	+2.4
Family First	John Ewers	868	4.1	+4.1
Democrats	Keryn Hassall	649	3.1	−4.1
Total formal votes		21,100	97.4	−0.6
Informal votes		559	2.6	+0.6
Turnout		21,659	92.2	−1.3
Two-party-preferred result
Liberal	Duncan McFetridge	11,686	55.4	−4.6
Labor	Tim Looker	9,414	44.6	+4.6
Liberal hold		Swing	−4.6	

=== Mount Gambier ===
2006 South Australian state election: Mount Gambier
Party	Candidate	Votes	%	±%
Independent	Rory McEwen	7,351	35.6	−22.8
Liberal	Peter Gandolfi	7,002	33.9	+13.6
Labor	Brad Coates	4,582	22.2	+4.9
Family First	Laura Crowe-Owen	842	4.1	+4.1
Greens	Rob Mengler	381	1.8	+1.8
Democrats	Tony Hill	347	1.7	−0.5
Independent	Laura Cunningham	170	0.8	+0.8
Total formal votes		20,675	95.7	−1.6
Informal votes		923	4.3	+1.6
Turnout		21,598	93.3	−1.1
Notional two-party-preferred count
Liberal	Peter Gandolfi	11,490	55.6	
Labor	Brad Coates	9,185	44.4	
Two-candidate-preferred result
Independent	Rory McEwen	11,618	56.2	−20.4
Liberal	Peter Gandolfi	9,057	43.8	+20.4
Independent hold		Swing	−20.4	

=== Napier ===
2006 South Australian state election: Napier
Party	Candidate	Votes	%	±%
Labor	Michael O'Brien	12,066	61.1	+9.2
Liberal	Joe Federico	3,718	18.8	−9.5
Family First	Peter Barnes	2,122	10.7	+10.7
Greens	Terry Allen	1,114	5.6	+5.6
Democrats	Scharyn Varley	736	3.7	−4.9
Total formal votes		19,756	95.4	
Informal votes		918	4.6	
Turnout		20,675	91.3	
Two-party-preferred result
Labor	Michael O'Brien	14,681	74.3	+10.0
Liberal	Joe Federico	5,075	25.7	−10.0
Labor hold		Swing	+10.0	

=== Newland ===
2006 South Australian state election: Newland
Party	Candidate	Votes	%	±%
Labor	Tom Kenyon	9,465	46.2	+11.2
Liberal	Mark Osterstock	6,995	34.1	−11.2
Family First	Brenda Bates	1,438	7.0	+0.1
Greens	Graham Smith	1,075	5.2	+5.2
Democrats	Ruth Russell	646	3.2	−7.1
No Rodeo	Troy Walker	316	1.5	+1.5
One Nation	Stan Batten	306	1.5	−0.9
Dignity for Disabled	Josephine Brooks	251	1.2	+1.2
Total formal votes		20,492	95.6	−2.0
Informal votes		947	4.4	+2.0
Turnout		21,439	93.8	−0.9
Two-party-preferred result
Labor	Tom Kenyon	11,639	56.8	+12.5
Liberal	Mark Osterstock	8,853	43.2	−12.5
Labor gain from Liberal		Swing	+12.5	

=== Norwood ===
2006 South Australian state election: Norwood
Party	Candidate	Votes	%	±%
Labor	Vini Ciccarello	8,389	42.4	+3.6
Liberal	Nigel Smart	8,010	40.5	−1.4
Greens	Cate Mussared	1,679	8.5	+2.5
Democrats	David Winderlich	545	2.8	−5.2
Family First	Roger Andrews	508	2.6	−0.2
Independent	Patrick Larkin	380	1.9	+1.9
Dignity for Disabled	Rick Neagle	274	1.4	+1.4
Total formal votes		19,785	96.6	−0.4
Informal votes		699	3.4	+0.4
Turnout		20,484	91.6	−0.4
Two-party-preferred result
Labor	Vini Ciccarello	10,723	54.2	+3.7
Liberal	Nigel Smart	9,062	45.8	−3.7
Labor hold		Swing	+3.7	

=== Playford ===
2006 South Australian state election: Playford
Party	Candidate	Votes	%	±%
Labor	Jack Snelling	13,205	64.0	+12.3
Liberal	Tom Javor	3,955	19.2	−9.8
Family First	John Doening	1,686	8.2	+2.7
Greens	Paul Sharpe	1,039	5.0	+5.0
Democrats	Ben Howieson	759	3.7	−4.8
Total formal votes		20,644	95.8	
Informal votes		858	4.2	
Turnout		21,502	92.9	
Two-party-preferred result
Labor	Jack Snelling	15,642	75.8	+12.7
Liberal	Tom Javor	5,002	24.2	−12.7
Labor hold		Swing	+12.7	

=== Port Adelaide ===
2006 South Australian state election: Port Adelaide
Party	Candidate	Votes	%	±%
Labor	Kevin Foley	12,453	63.6	+5.2
Liberal	Anna Micheel	3,671	18.7	−3.9
Greens	Anne McMenamin	1,289	6.6	+2.4
Family First	James Troup	1,120	5.7	+5.7
Democrats	Amy Van Oosten	499	2.5	−3.6
One Nation	Darren Fairweather	310	1.6	−1.2
Independent	John McGill	250	1.3	+1.3
Total formal votes		19,592	95.0	−1.5
Informal votes		1,030	5.0	+1.5
Turnout		20,622	92.4	−1.3
Two-party-preferred result
Labor	Kevin Foley	14,823	75.7	+4.0
Liberal	Anna Micheel	4,769	24.3	−4.0
Labor hold		Swing	+4.0	

=== Ramsay ===
2006 South Australian state election: Ramsay
Party	Candidate	Votes	%	±%
Labor	Mike Rann	13,753	71.5	+9.9
Liberal	Damien Pilkington	3,519	18.3	−5.1
Greens	David Nicks	938	4.9	+4.9
Democrats	Chris Calvert	693	3.6	−3.4
Independent	Colin Wuttke	324	1.7	+1.7
Total formal votes		19,227	95.4	−1.2
Informal votes		917	4.6	+1.2
Turnout		20,144	91.4	−1.9
Two-party-preferred result
Labor	Mike Rann	15,088	78.5	+8.3
Liberal	Damien Pilkington	4,139	21.5	−8.3
Labor hold		Swing	+8.3	

=== Reynell ===
2006 South Australian state election: Reynell
Party	Candidate	Votes	%	±%
Labor	Gay Thompson	11,653	58.0	+15.2
Liberal	Gary Hennessy	4,850	24.2	−9.2
Family First	Geoff Doecke	1,755	8.7	+1.9
Greens	William Weller	942	4.7	+0.7
Democrats	Yvonne Baillie	472	2.4	−4.5
No Rodeo	Marie Nicholls	403	2.0	+2.0
Total formal votes		20,075	96.1	
Informal votes		815	3.9	
Turnout		20,890	92.6	
Two-party-preferred result
Labor	Gay Thompson	13,568	67.6	+11.8
Liberal	Gary Hennessy	6,507	32.4	−11.8
Labor hold		Swing	+11.8	

=== Schubert ===
2006 South Australian state election: Schubert
Party	Candidate	Votes	%	±%
Liberal	Ivan Venning	9,822	47.3	−1.5
Labor	Kym Wilson	7,002	33.7	+12.2
Family First	Phillip Sawyer	1,630	7.9	+7.8
Greens	Patricia Murray	1,551	7.5	+3.1
Democrats	Ian DeLaine	754	3.6	−5.0
Total formal votes		20,759	96.5	
Informal votes		697	3.5	
Turnout		21,456	94.1	
Two-party-preferred result
Liberal	Ivan Venning	11,719	56.4	−7.3
Labor	Kym Wilson	9,040	43.6	+7.3
Liberal hold		Swing	−7.3	

=== Stuart ===
2006 South Australian state election: Stuart
Party	Candidate	Votes	%	±%
Liberal	Graham Gunn	9,441	45.7	−0.4
Labor	Justin Jarvis	9,021	43.7	+3.4
Family First	Greg Patrick	943	4.6	+4.6
Greens	Jane Alcorn	737	3.6	+3.6
Democrats	Bruce Lennon	353	1.7	−2.2
Independent	Simon Cook	142	0.7	+0.7
Total formal votes		20,637	96.9	−0.8
Informal votes		669	3.1	+0.8
Turnout		21,306	91.9	−2.0
Two-party-preferred result
Liberal	Graham Gunn	10,435	50.6	−0.7
Labor	Justin Jarvis	10,202	49.4	+0.7
Liberal hold		Swing	−0.7	

=== Taylor ===
2006 South Australian state election: Taylor
Party	Candidate	Votes	%	±%
Labor	Trish White	13,552	67.7	+8.8
Liberal	Linda Caruso	3,522	17.6	−8.3
Family First	Paul Coombe	1,694	8.5	+8.5
Greens	Penny Johnston	776	3.9	+3.9
Democrats	Frances Coombe	475	2.4	−4.8
Total formal votes		20,019	95.1	
Informal votes		961	4.9	
Turnout		20,980	92.1	
Two-party-preferred result
Labor	Trish White	15,494	77.4	+9.7
Liberal	Linda Caruso	4,525	22.6	−9.7
Labor hold		Swing	+9.7	

=== Torrens ===
2006 South Australian state election: Torrens
Party	Candidate	Votes	%	±%
Labor	Robyn Geraghty	11,587	58.8	+10.7
Liberal	Adam Howard	4,738	24.0	−8.6
Family First	Owen Hood	1,439	7.3	+1.3
Greens	Sally Reid	1,274	6.5	+6.5
Democrats	Luke Fraser	672	3.4	−5.4
Total formal votes		19,710	96.4	
Informal votes		689	3.6	
Turnout		20,399	92.3	
Two-party-preferred result
Labor	Robyn Geraghty	13,614	69.1	+10.7
Liberal	Adam Howard	6,096	30.9	−10.7
Labor hold		Swing	+10.7	

=== Unley ===
2006 South Australian state election: Unley
Party	Candidate	Votes	%	±%
Liberal	David Pisoni	8,964	45.5	−6.9
Labor	Michael Keenan	7,324	37.2	+6.8
Greens	Peter Solly	1,937	9.8	+3.7
Democrats	Bruce Hogben	609	3.1	−4.1
Family First	David Kingham	495	2.5	+2.5
Dignity for Disabled	Katharine Annear	362	1.8	+1.8
Total formal votes		19,691	97.4	−0.6
Informal votes		523	2.6	+0.6
Turnout		20,214	90.9	−0.6
Two-party-preferred result
Liberal	David Pisoni	10,064	51.1	−7.9
Labor	Michael Keenan	9,627	48.9	+7.9
Liberal hold		Swing	−7.9	

=== Waite ===
2006 South Australian state election: Waite
Party	Candidate	Votes	%	±%
Liberal	Martin Hamilton-Smith	9,876	47.0	−6.0
Labor	Diana Gibbs-Ludbrook	7,078	33.7	+9.6
Greens	Zane Young	2,222	10.6	+5.3
Democrats	Simon Regan	957	4.6	−7.7
Family First	John Queale	895	4.3	+1.3
Total formal votes		21,028	97.5	+0.0
Informal votes		546	2.5	+0.0
Turnout		21,574	91.4	−1.7
Two-party-preferred result
Liberal	Martin Hamilton-Smith	11,362	54.0	−8.0
Labor	Diana Gibbs-Ludbrook	9,666	46.0	+8.0
Liberal hold		Swing	−8.0	

=== West Torrens ===
2006 South Australian state election: West Torrens
Party	Candidate	Votes	%	±%
Labor	Tom Koutsantonis	11,222	56.6	+10.8
Liberal	Emilio Costanzo	5,318	26.8	−8.6
Greens	Timothy White	1,644	8.3	+2.1
Family First	David Wall	988	5.0	+2.2
Democrats	Nicole Prince	660	3.3	−3.2
Total formal votes		19,832	96.6	
Informal votes		694	3.4	
Turnout		20,526	91.0	
Two-party-preferred result
Labor	Tom Koutsantonis	13,536	68.3	+9.7
Liberal	Emilio Costanzo	6,296	31.7	−9.7
Labor hold		Swing	+9.7	

=== Wright ===
2006 South Australian state election: Wright
Party	Candidate	Votes	%	±%
Labor	Jennifer Rankine	12,080	57.6	+12.6
Liberal	Stephen Ernst	5,605	26.7	−11.6
Family First	Malcolm Reynolds	1,541	7.3	+0.1
Greens	Holden Ward	817	3.9	+3.9
Dignity for Disabled	Sarah Rischmueller	506	2.4	+2.4
Democrats	Scott Jesser	428	2.0	−5.3
Total formal votes		20,977	96.1	−1.7
Informal votes		855	3.9	+1.7
Turnout		21,832	93.7	−0.9
Two-party-preferred result
Labor	Jennifer Rankine	13,694	65.3	+12.1
Liberal	Stephen Ernst	7,283	34.7	−12.1
Labor hold		Swing	+12.1	

== See also ==
- Candidates of the 2006 South Australian state election
- Members of the South Australian House of Assembly, 2006–2010
