= Electoral results for the district of Taylor =

South Australian district election results

This is a list of electoral results for the Electoral district of Taylor in South Australian state elections.

== Members for Taylor ==
Member	Party	Term
Lynn Arnold	Labor	1993–1994
Trish White	Labor	1994–2010
Leesa Vlahos	Labor	2010–2018
Jon Gee	Labor	2018–present

== Election results ==
=== Elections in the 2020s ===
==== 2026 ====
2026 South Australian state election: Taylor
Party	Candidate	Votes	%	±%
Labor	Nick Champion	9,201	39.7	−13.7
One Nation	Peter Rentoulis	7,956	34.3	+25.5
Greens	Xander Osborne	1,890	8.1	+2.1
Liberal	Ted Boul Hosn	1,870	8.1	−13.0
Family First	Kylie Evans	1,288	5.6	−2.1
Legalise Cannabis	Brett Stephens	725	3.1	+3.1
Australian Family	John Attard	261	1.1	+1.1
Total formal votes		23,191	95.0	+0.2
Informal votes		1,221	5.0	−0.2
Turnout		24,412	82.6	−1.0
Two-candidate-preferred result
Labor	Nick Champion	12,577	54.2	−15.5
One Nation	Peter Rentoulis	10,611	45.8	+45.8
Labor hold				

==== 2022 ====
2022 South Australian state election: Taylor
Party	Candidate	Votes	%	±%
Labor	Nick Champion	11,752	53.4	+8.1
Liberal	Shawn Lock	4,629	21.1	+0.8
One Nation	Michelle Crowley	1,934	8.8	+8.8
Family First	Gary Balfort	1,695	7.7	+7.7
Greens	John Wishart	1,314	6.0	−1.0
Independent	Rita Kuhlmann	668	3.0	+3.0
Total formal votes		21,992	94.8	
Informal votes		1,204	5.2	
Turnout		23,196	83.6	
Two-party-preferred result
Labor	Nick Champion	15,319	69.7	+7.8
Liberal	Shawn Lock	6,673	30.3	−7.8
Labor hold		Swing	+7.8	

Distribution of preferences: Taylor
Party	Candidate	Votes	Round 1		Round 2		Round 3		Round 4	
Party	Candidate	Votes	Dist.	Total	Dist.	Total	Dist.	Total	Dist.	Total
Quota (50% + 1)		10,997								
Labor	Nick Champion	11,752	+129	11,881	+787	12,668	+475	13,143	+2,176	15,319
Liberal	Shawn Lock	4,629	+52	4,681	+135	4,816	+400	5,216	+1,457	6,673
One Nation	Michelle Crowley	1,934	+130	2,064	+94	2,158	Excluded			
Family First	Gary Balfort	1,695	+171	1,866	+484x	2,350	+1,283	3,633	Excluded	
Greens	John Wishart	1,314	+186	1,500	Excluded					
Independent	Rita Kuhlmann	668	Excluded							

=== Elections in the 2010s ===
==== 2018 ====
2018 South Australian state election: Taylor
Party	Candidate	Votes	%	±%
Labor	Jon Gee	9,786	43.6	−4.3
SA-Best	Sonja Taylor	5,644	25.1	+25.1
Liberal	Sarika Sharma	4,308	19.2	−13.0
Greens	Kate Randell	1,491	6.6	−0.5
Conservatives	Danny Bradley	1,239	5.5	−6.4
Total formal votes		22,468	94.3	−1.4
Informal votes		1,358	5.7	+1.4
Turnout		23,826	86.7	+4.6
Two-party-preferred result
Labor	Jon Gee	13,660	60.8	+2.3
Liberal	Sarika Sharma	8,808	39.2	−2.3
Two-candidate-preferred result
Labor	Jon Gee	12,516	55.7	−2.8
SA-Best	Sonja Taylor	9,952	44.3	+44.3
Labor hold				

2014 South Australian state election: Taylor
Party	Candidate	Votes	%	±%
Labor	Leesa Vlahos	10,723	51.0	−4.0
Liberal	Alexander Hyde	6,542	31.1	+2.7
Family First	Lenny Jessiman	2,309	11.0	+0.4
Greens	Kirsten Wahlstrom	1,448	6.9	+1.1
Total formal votes		21,022	95.9	+0.1
Informal votes		895	4.1	−0.1
Turnout		21,917	91.3	−1.7
Two-party-preferred result
Labor	Leesa Vlahos	12,940	61.6	−1.0
Liberal	Alexander Hyde	8,082	38.4	+1.0
Labor hold		Swing	−1.0	

2010 South Australian state election: Taylor
Party	Candidate	Votes	%	±%
Labor	Leesa Vlahos	11,755	53.5	−13.4
Liberal	Cassandra Ludwig	6,580	29.9	+11.5
Family First	Paul Coombe	2,324	10.6	+2.2
Greens	Kirsten Wahlstrom	1,326	6.0	+2.1
Total formal votes		21,985	95.1	
Informal votes		966	4.9	
Turnout		22,951	93.0	
Two-party-preferred result
Labor	Leesa Vlahos	13,429	61.1	−15.4
Liberal	Cassandra Ludwig	8,556	38.9	+15.4
Labor hold		Swing	−15.4	

=== Elections in the 2000s ===
2006 South Australian state election: Taylor
Party	Candidate	Votes	%	±%
Labor	Trish White	13,552	67.7	+8.8
Liberal	Linda Caruso	3,522	17.6	−8.3
Family First	Paul Coombe	1,694	8.5	+8.5
Greens	Penny Johnston	776	3.9	+3.9
Democrats	Frances Coombe	475	2.4	−4.8
Total formal votes		20,019	95.1	
Informal votes		961	4.9	
Turnout		20,980	92.1	
Two-party-preferred result
Labor	Trish White	15,494	77.4	+9.7
Liberal	Linda Caruso	4,525	22.6	−9.7
Labor hold		Swing	+9.7	

2002 South Australian state election: Taylor
Party	Candidate	Votes	%	±%
Labor	Trish White	11,557	58.9	+4.1
Liberal	Anne Heinrich	5,076	25.9	+1.0
Democrats	Shirley Humphrey	1,403	7.1	−10.0
SA First	Hazel Dermody	860	4.4	+4.4
One Nation	John Mahoney	732	3.7	+3.7
Total formal votes		19,628	96.8	
Informal votes		647	3.2	
Turnout		20,275	93.4	
Two-party-preferred result
Labor	Trish White	13,283	67.7	−0.3
Liberal	Anne Heinrich	6,345	32.3	+0.3
Labor hold		Swing	−0.3	

=== Elections in the 1990s ===
1997 South Australian state election: Taylor
Party	Candidate	Votes	%	±%
Labor	Trish White	10,657	58.7	+7.6
Liberal	Matt Dyki	3,840	21.2	−13.1
Democrats	Helen Munro	2,952	16.3	+5.2
National Action	Lynette Schultz	697	3.8	+3.8
Total formal votes		18,146	95.1	−0.9
Informal votes		940	4.9	+0.9
Turnout		19,086	92.2	
Two-party-preferred result
Labor	Trish White	13,101	72.2	+12.7
Liberal	Matt Dyki	5,045	27.8	−12.7
Labor hold		Swing	+12.7	

1994 Taylor state by-election
Party	Candidate	Votes	%	±%
Labor	Trish White	10,635	68.56	+17.50
Grey Power	Emily Gilbey-Riley	2,025	13.06	+13.06
Ind. Lib.	Bernhard Cotton	1,638	10.56	+10.56
Independent	Michael Brander	921	5.94	+5.94
Natural Law	Vladimir Lorenzon	291	1.88	+1.88
Other				−48.94
Total formal votes		15,510	92.37	−4.07
Informal votes		1,280	7.63	+4.07
Turnout		16,790	79.61	−13.27
Two-candidate-preferred result
Labor	Trish White	11,275	75.60	N/A
Grey Power	Emily Gilbey-Riley	4,235	27.30	N/A
Labor hold		Swing	N/A	

1993 South Australian state election: Taylor
Party	Candidate	Votes	%	±%
Labor	Lynn Arnold	9,501	51.1	−7.2
Liberal	Stephany Georgeff	6,813	36.6	+5.8
Democrats	Helen Munro	2,293	12.3	+1.3
Total formal votes		18,607	96.5	+1.1
Informal votes		682	3.5	−1.1
Turnout		19,289	92.9	
Two-party-preferred result
Labor	Lynn Arnold	10,784	58.0	−6.1
Liberal	Stephany Georgeff	7,823	42.0	+6.1
Labor hold		Swing	−6.1	
