= Members of the South Australian House of Assembly, 2014–2018 =

This is a list of members of the South Australian House of Assembly from 2014 to 2018, as elected at the 2014 state election.

Name	Party	Electorate	Term of office
Hon Michael Atkinson	Labor	Croydon	1989–2018
Frances Bedford	Labor/Independent (Note: Labor member for Florey, Frances Bedford, resigned from the Labor Party on 28 March 2017 and became an independent, after Jack Snelling was endorsed by the party for pre-selection in the run-up to the 2018 election.)	Florey	1997–2022
Troy Bell	Liberal/Independent (Note: Liberal member for Mount Gambier, Troy Bell, resigned from the Liberal Party on 17 August 2017 and became an independent, due to criminal financial allegations.)	Mount Gambier	2014–2025
Hon Zoe Bettison	Labor	Ramsay	2012–present
Leon Bignell	Labor	Mawson	2006–2026
Hon Geoff Brock	Independent	Frome	2009–present
Hon Paul Caica	Labor	Colton	2002–2018
Vickie Chapman	Liberal	Bragg	2002–2022
Hon Susan Close	Labor	Port Adelaide	2012–2026
Nat Cook (Note: Independent member for Fisher, Bob Such, died on 10 October 2014. Labor candidate Nat Cook won the resulting by-election on 6 December 2014.)	Labor	Fisher	2014–present
Annabel Digance	Labor	Elder	2014–2018
Sam Duluk (Note: Liberal member for Davenport, former party leader Iain Evans, resigned on 30 October 2014. Liberal candidate Sam Duluk won the resulting by-election on 31 January 2015.)	Liberal	Davenport	2015–2022
Hon Iain Evans	Liberal	Davenport	1993–2014
John Gardner	Liberal	Morialta	2010–2026
Jon Gee	Labor	Napier	2014–2022
Mark Goldsworthy	Liberal	Kavel	2002–2018
Steven Griffiths	Liberal	Goyder	2006–2018
Martin Hamilton-Smith	Liberal/Independent (Note: Liberal member for Waite, former party leader Martin Hamilton-Smith, resigned from the Liberal Party on 27 May 2014 and became an independent.)	Waite	1997–2018
Katrine Hildyard	Labor	Reynell	2014–present
Eddie Hughes	Labor	Giles	2014–present
Tom Kenyon	Labor	Newland	2006–2018
Hon Steph Key	Labor	Ashford	1997–2018
Stephan Knoll	Liberal	Schubert	2014–2022
Tom Koutsantonis	Labor	West Torrens	1997–present
Dr Duncan McFetridge	Liberal/Independent (Note: Liberal member for Morphett, Duncan McFetridge, resigned from the Liberal Party in May 2014 and became an independent, after losing party endorsement for pre-selection in the run-up to the 2018 election.)	Morphett	2002–2018
Steven Marshall	Liberal	Dunstan	2010–2024
Hon Stephen Mullighan	Labor	Lee	2014–2026
Lee Odenwalder	Labor	Little Para	2010–2026
Adrian Pederick	Liberal	Hammond	2006–2026
Michael Pengilly	Liberal	Finniss	2006–2018
Tony Piccolo	Labor	Light	2006–2026
Chris Picton	Labor	Kaurna	2014–present
David Pisoni	Liberal	Unley	2006–2026
Hon Jennifer Rankine	Labor	Wright	1997–2018
John Rau	Labor	Enfield	2002–2018
Isobel Redmond	Liberal	Heysen	2002–2018
Rachel Sanderson	Liberal	Adelaide	2010–2022
Hon Jack Snelling	Labor	Playford	1997–2018
David Speirs	Liberal	Bright	2014–2024
Hon Dr Bob Such	Independent	Fisher	1989–2014
Vincent Tarzia	Liberal	Hartley	2014–2026
Peter Treloar	Liberal	Flinders	2010–2022
Dan van Holst Pellekaan	Liberal	Stuart	2010–2022
Leesa Vlahos	Labor	Taylor	2010–2018
Hon Jay Weatherill	Labor	Cheltenham	2002–2018
Tim Whetstone	Liberal	Chaffey	2010–present
Mitch Williams	Liberal	MacKillop	1997–2018
Corey Wingard	Liberal	Mitchell	2014–2022
Dana Wortley	Labor	Torrens	2014–2026

== See also ==
- Members of the South Australian Legislative Council, 2014–2018
