= Anna Moir Rennie =

Australian politician

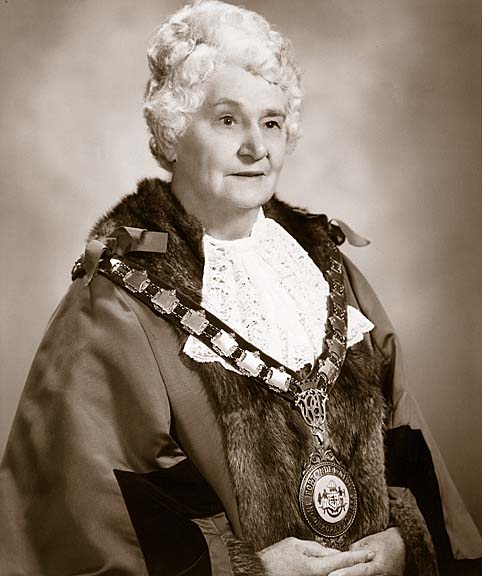

Mayor of Port Adelaide (1964–69)

Personal details
- Born: Anna Moir Rogers; 12 July 1899
- Died: 26 June 1987 (aged 87)

Anna Moir Rennie (née Rogers; 12 July 1899 – 26 June 1987) was the first female Mayor of Port Adelaide between the years 1964 and 1969. Before becoming Mayor, she served as the Councillor for the South Ward between 1950 and 1964.

== Early life ==
Anna Moir Rennie (née Rogers) was born on 12 July 1899 as the youngest of 13 children. She grew up in country South Australia firstly in Mingary, (a railway town 369 km from Adelaide on the way to Broken Hill) and then moved to Quorn as a 15-year-old. Upon finishing school, she started work as a hotel housekeeper, and in 1919 started training as a nurse. She completed this training at the Royal Adelaide Hospital in 1921.

In 1921 she married George Rennie (known as ‘Scotty’). She had known George since she was a teenager and their marriage was a partnership of equals that endured until George's death in 1959.

In 1936 Rennie was hit by a truck on North Terrace. Told she was never going to walk again, her family helped her rehabilitate in the form of a stationary bicycle. She was able to resume walking with a support for her spine.

Following their marriage, the Rennies rented a house in Langham Place, Port Adelaide, which they eventually bought and lived in for the rest of their lives.

== Early contribution ==
Together with her husband, Rennie became an active member of their community in the 1920s and 1930s. During this time, Port Adelaide was severely impacted by post-war economic decline and the subsequent Great Depression.

An advocate for the impoverished working class, Rennie joined the Port Adelaide Ratepayers Organisation and the Australian Labor Party. She moved up the ranks to become the President of the Central Committee. She also became President of the SA Housewives Association.

Despite the physical impairment of a broken back, during WWII she worked at a munition’s factory. In the 1930s she started a weekly radio program on 5AD for the Housewives Association which continued on into the 1940s. While none of the audio from these programs remain, many of the original scripts and transcripts still exist.

== Political life ==
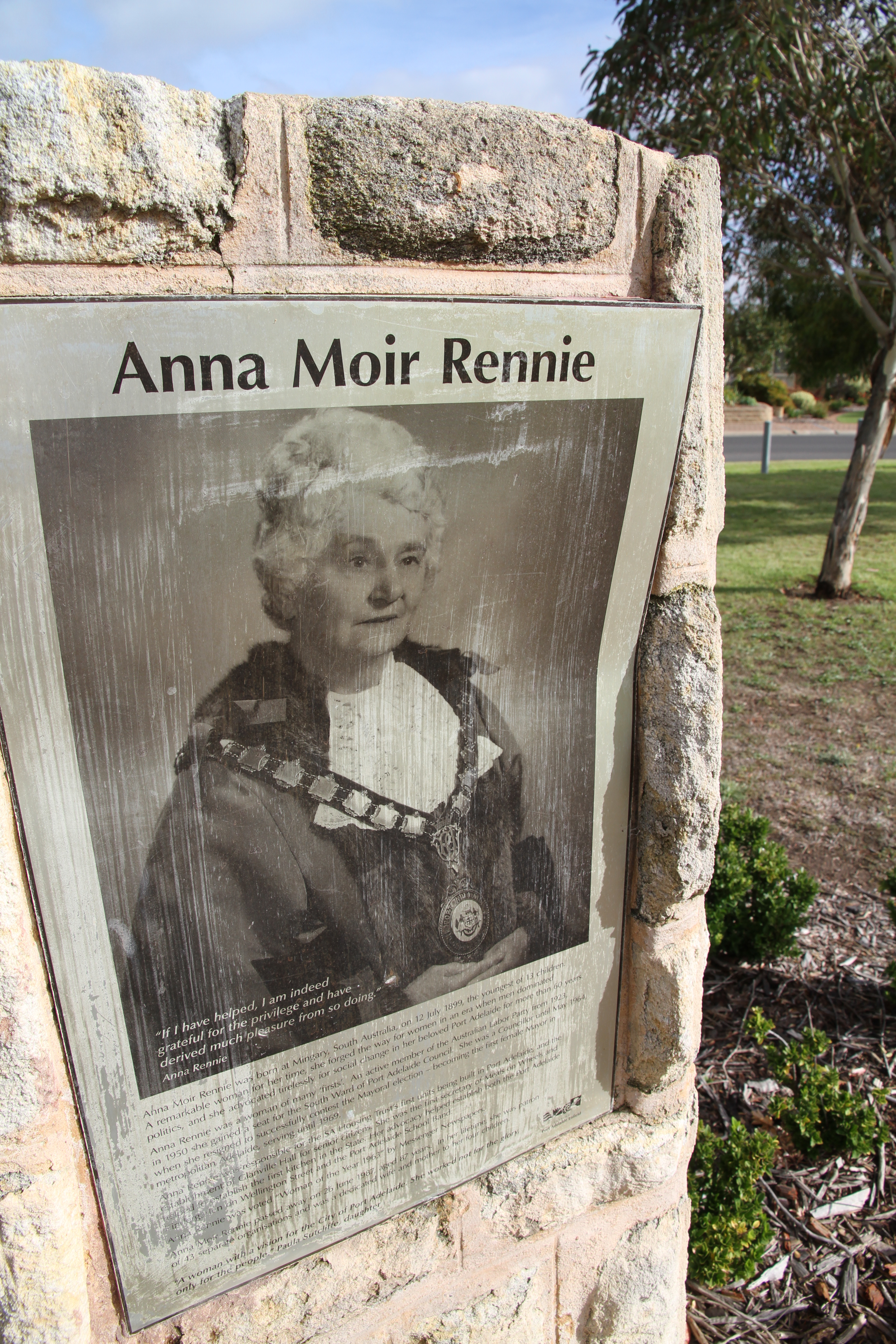
The plaque of Anna Moir Rennie at the A.M Reserve in North Haven

=== Councillor ===
In 1949, with encouragement from her husband, Rennie ran for a seat as a Councillor in Port Adelaide. Unsuccessful the first time, she persisted and ran again in 1950 and won, becoming the first female Councillor for South Ward, Port Adelaide.

She remained on the council for 14 years, spearheading multiple projects to benefit the local community. One of her achievements was in collaboration with Doris Taylor to open the first Meals on Wheels kitchen in Australia in 1954. Anna organised for a parcel of land at on the corner of Langham Place to be the inaugural home for Meals on Wheels and maintained her involvement as Treasurer until the 1970s.

She campaigned for improvements to the food ration scheme in Port Adelaide and played an important part in establishing the Port Archway (drug and alcohol) facility, Port’s first free kindergarten in Wellington Street, Port Adelaide, many Senior Citizens Clubs, sports clubs and the development of the Swan Terrace Olympic Pool.

In 1963 she was awarded Woman of the Year by the Messenger Newspaper.

=== Mayor ===
In 1964 Anna Rennie successfully ran for the position of Mayor of Port Adelaide. She was the second female mayor in South Australia, and the first within metropolitan Adelaide. Her son, Gordon, took her place as Councillor, and attended most events with her, until his death in 1965. She continued fighting for all the causes she had been an advocate for, including opposing the rising rates in her council. Despite community support, it was challenging for Rennie to be the only woman on Council.

She chose to retire as Mayor in 1969, after 5 years.

Anna Rennie died on 26 June 1987, just shy of her 88th birthday. She is interred at the Cheltenham Cemetery, South Australia

== Legacy ==
In her lifetime, Rennie was patron of 43 separate organisations and a vocal member of the Port Adelaide community for over 60 years.

Her contribution to the Port Adelaide community is remembered through the AM Rennie Reserve in North Haven and the Anna Rennie Loop Path that hugs the inner harbour of the Port River. She is also commemorated on the Port Adelaide Workers Memorial.

=== The Anna Rennie Chapter ===
In 2007, the Port Adelaide Enfield Chamber of Commerce formed the Anna Rennie Chapter. The Chapter was dedicated to supporting professional women to reach their potential and realise economic independence. The Anna Rennie Chapter disbanded in 2018.
