= Electoral results for the Division of Spence =

Australian division election results

This is a list of electoral results for the Division of Spence in Australian federal elections from the division's creation in 2019 until the present.

== Members ==
Member	Party	Term
Nick Champion	Labor	2019–2022
Matt Burnell	Labor	2022–present

== Election results ==
=== Elections in the 2020s ===
==== 2025 ====
2025 Australian federal election: Spence
Party	Candidate	Votes	%	±%
Labor	Matt Burnell	49,463	44.33	+0.47
Liberal	Daniel Wild	20,852	18.69	−6.87
Greens	Luke Skinner	16,166	14.49	+3.14
One Nation	Darryl Bothe	10,654	9.55	−1.31
Family First	John Bennett	4,901	4.39	+4.39
Trumpet of Patriots	Paul Morrell	4,454	3.99	+2.36
Independent	Kym Hanton	2,749	2.46	+2.46
Animal Justice	Miranda Smith	2,343	2.10	+2.10
Total formal votes		111,582	91.80	−3.25
Informal votes		9,968	8.20	+3.25
Turnout		121,550	87.51	+0.94
Two-party-preferred result
Labor	Matt Burnell	72,903	65.34	+2.44
Liberal	Daniel Wild	38,679	34.66	−2.44
Labor hold		Swing	+2.44	

==== 2022 ====
2022 Australian federal election: Spence
Party	Candidate	Votes	%	±%
Labor	Matt Burnell	46,596	43.86	−7.10
Liberal	Shawn Lock	27,153	25.56	−0.27
Greens	David Deex	12,052	11.35	+4.14
One Nation	Linda Champion	11,532	10.86	+10.86
United Australia	Alvin Warren	7,158	6.74	−0.30
Federation	Matilda Bawden	1,736	1.63	+1.63
Total formal votes		106,227	95.05	+1.03
Informal votes		5,534	4.95	−1.03
Turnout		111,761	86.57	−3.97
Two-party-preferred result
Labor	Matt Burnell	66,818	62.90	−1.23
Liberal	Shawn Lock	39,409	37.10	+1.23
Labor hold		Swing	−1.23	

Alluvial diagram for preference flows in the seat of Spence in the 2022 federal election. indicates at what stage the winning candidate had over 50% of the votes and was declared the winner.

=== Elections in the 2010s ===
==== 2019 ====
2019 Australian federal election: Spence
Party	Candidate	Votes	%	±%
Labor	Nick Champion	51,791	50.96	+5.79
Liberal	Kathleen Bourne	26,252	25.83	+5.13
Greens	Daniel Jury	7,330	7.21	+2.65
United Australia	Ron Fiedler	7,157	7.04	+7.04
Independent	Nathan Herbert	5,473	5.39	+5.39
Animal Justice	Rita Kuhlmann	3,626	3.57	+2.96
Total formal votes		101,629	94.02	−0.14
Informal votes		6,467	5.98	+0.14
Turnout		108,096	90.54	+2.63
Two-party-preferred result
Labor	Nick Champion	65,174	64.13	−3.04
Liberal	Kathleen Bourne	36,455	35.87	+3.04
Labor notional hold		Swing	−3.04	
