= Doris Taylor (disambiguation) =

Doris Taylor (born ca. 1960), American stem cell scientist.

Doris Taylor may also refer to:

- Doris Irene Taylor (1909–1968), founder and organiser of Meals on Wheels in South Australia
- Doris Taylor (plant)

== See also ==
- Doris Tayler, commonly known as Doris Lessing, writer
