= Michael O'Brien (South Australian politician) =

Australian politician

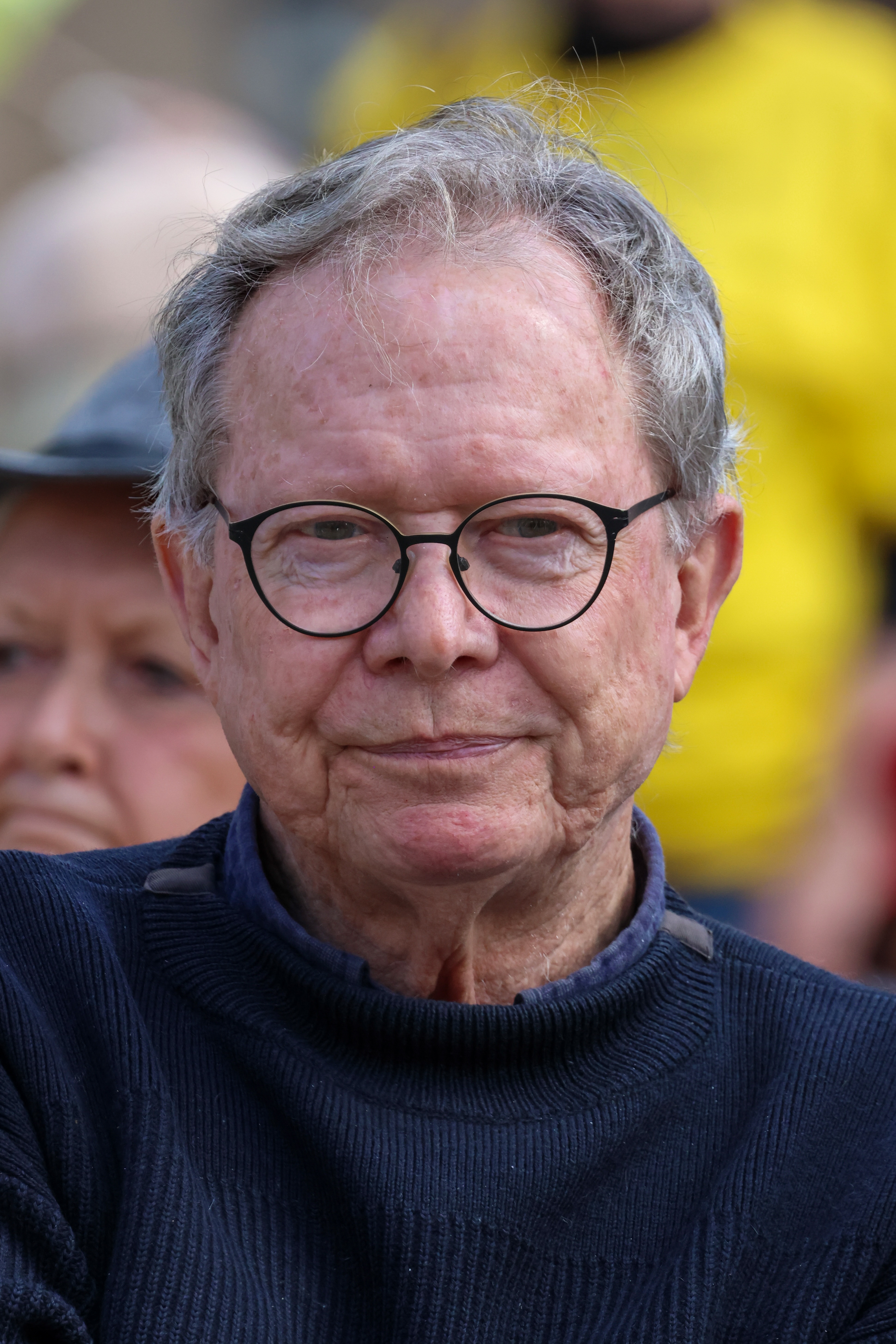
- O'Brien in 2026

Minister for Finance
- In office 21 October 2011 – 6 February 2014
- Premier: Jay Weatherill
- Succeeded by: Jay Weatherill

Minister for Police
- In office 21 January 2013 – 6 February 2014
- Preceded by: Jennifer Rankine
- Succeeded by: John Rau

Minister for Correctional Services
- In office 21 January 2013 – 6 February 2014
- Preceded by: Jennifer Rankine
- Succeeded by: John Rau

Minister for Emergency Services
- In office 21 January 2013 – 6 February 2014
- Preceded by: Jennifer Rankine
- Succeeded by: Ian Hunter

Minister for Road Safety
- In office 21 January 2013 – 6 February 2014
- Preceded by: Jennifer Rankine
- Succeeded by: Ian Hunter

Member for Napier Parliament of South Australia
- In office 9 February 2002 – 15 March 2014
- Preceded by: Annette Hurley
- Succeeded by: Jon Gee

Personal details
- Born: 10 April 1949 (age 77)
- Party: Labor Party
- Spouse: Jane

Michael O'Brien (born 10 April 1949) was the Labor member for Napier in the South Australian House of Assembly from 2002 to 2014. He was Minister for Finance, Minister for Police, Minister for Emergency Services, Minister for Correctional Services and Minister for Road Safety.

O'Brien was elevated to Cabinet on 2 March 2009 with Tom Koutsantonis following the resignations of Rory McEwen and Carmel Zollo. He resigned from Cabinet on 31 January 2014, at which time he also announced that he would not contest the 2014 South Australian election.

== Early career ==
Before entering parliament, O'Brien was a national manager with Elders IXL and held senior executive positions with the Royal Automobile Association (RAA) and University of Adelaide. He and his wife were small/medium business operators for 16 years.

O'Brien has Bachelor of Arts and Master of Business Administration degrees from the University of Adelaide. He has also attended the Kennedy School at Harvard University. When he entered Parliament in 2002, O'Brien was the only Labor MP with an extensive background in business and the private sector.

== Maiden speech ==
In his maiden speech, O'Brien reflected on the short history of his electorate, which was born from the Playford Government's drive to establish a strong manufacturing sector in South Australia. O'Brien noted that Federal Government policies to dismantle tariffs had caused adverse economic and social impacts.

In 2007, O'Brien was appointed chair of the State Planning Review, which developed the 30-year Plan for Greater Adelaide. Launched in 2010, the plan prepares for steady population growth of 560,000 people, the construction of 258,000 more dwellings, the creation of 282,000 jobs, and economic growth of $128 billion by 2040.

O'Brien also convened the Premier's Food Council, was chair of the Riverland Futures Taskforce and co-chair of the SA Business Development Council. In the first Rann Government, O'Brien was parliamentary secretary to the Minister for Transport.

== Cabinet posts ==
Initially entering Cabinet as Minister for Road Safety and Minister for Employment, Training and Further Education and Minister for Science and Information Economy, O'Brien was promoted to the portfolios of Agriculture, Food and Fisheries, Forests and Regional Development in March 2010.

As Minister for Regional Development he launched the $20 million Riverland Sustainable Futures Fund in September 2010. O'Brien said the Government aimed to achieve about $500 million of investment in the Riverland over the next 20 years.

As Minister for Agriculture, O'Brien established an Agribusiness Council comprising high-level business and industry leaders to advise the government on policy issues and opportunities for growth. O'Brien advocated strongly on behalf of the state's apple industry after the Federal Government lifted restrictions on the import of New Zealand fruit.

He also led a national push to introduce mandatory stunning of livestock killed according to Hal-lal and Kosher traditions, which won acclaim from animal welfare activists, however the proposal failed to gain the support of all states and the Commonwealth.

== South East forests ==
As Minister for Forests, O'Brien faced hostility in the South East of the state when he advanced the government's plans to forward sell harvest rights

In November 2010, O'Brien clashed in Parliament with then Treasurer Kevin Foley, who accused him of creating "unnecessary anxiety" over the planned forward sale. Opponents of the plan, however, credited O'Brien with revealing details and being upfront with community members.

Later in November 2010, Foley and Premier Mike Rann required a police escort to enter the Labor Party State Convention as union anger with budget cuts boiled over. O'Brien told journalists it was time for a change of leadership and refused to back Foley. "I am saying that the time has now arrived for both factions to sit down and seriously discuss the issue of leadership succession," he said.

Foley stood down as Deputy Premier and Treasurer in February 2011 and left Cabinet in October 2011 when Jay Weatherill became Premier.

== Weatherill Cabinet ==
Weatherill, from the minority Left faction, rewarded O'Brien for his cross-factional support and elevated him to the key portfolios of Finance and Public Sector.

In January 2013, Weatherill further promoted O'Brien to the portfolios of Police, Emergency Services, Correctional Services and Road Safety, while retaining him in Finance.

It was announced in January 2014 that O'Brien offered his state seat of Napier to Don Farrell, to contest for Labor at the 2014 election. O'Brien resigned from his ministerial roles and would leave parliament at the 2014 election. Premier Jay Weatherill threatened to resign if Farrell was successfully preselected. A few hours later, Farrell withdrew his nomination.

South Australian House of Assembly
Preceded by Annette Hurley	Member for Napier; 2002–2014	Succeeded by Jon Gee
