= 1994 Taylor state by-election =

- 5 November 1994

Electoral district of Taylor in the South Australian House of Assembly
	First party	Second party
		GP
Candidate	Trish White	Emily Gilbey-Riley
Party	Labor	Grey Power
Primary vote	10,635	2,025
Percentage	68.56%	13.06%
Swing	▲17.50	▲13.06
TCP	75.60%	27.30%
TCP swing	▲17.64	▲27.30
MP before election
Lynn Arnold
Labor
Elected MP
Trish White
Labor

The 1994 Taylor state by-election was held on 5 November 1994 in the South Australian House of Assembly electorate of Taylor, centred on Paralowie in the northern suburbs of Adelaide. The by-election was triggered by the resignation of state Labor MHA and former premier, Lynn Arnold, on 21 September 1994. The newly created seat had been won by Arnold at the 1993 state election with a primary vote of 51.06 percent.

The Liberal Party and the Democrats, who contested the previous election and gained 36.62 percent and 12.32 percent of the vote respectively, did not run candidates in the by-election. Labor easily retained the seat.

== Timeline ==
- 21 September 1994 − Arnold resigned, vacating the seat of Taylor
- 6 October 1994 − Writ issued by Speaker of the House of Assembly for a by-election
- 21 October 1994 (noon) − Close of nominations and draw for positions on the ballot paper
- 5 November 1994 (8am−6pm) − Polling day

== Results ==
Taylor state by-election, 5 November 1994
Party	Candidate	Votes	%	±%
Labor	Trish White	10,635	68.56	+17.50
Grey Power	Emily Gilbey-Riley	2,025	13.06	+13.06
Independent Liberal	Bernhard Cotton	1,638	10.56	+10.56
Independent	Michael Brander	921	5.94	+5.94
Natural Law	Vladimir Lorenzon	291	1.88	+1.88
Total formal votes		15,510	92.37	−4.07
Informal votes		1,280	7.63	+4.07
Turnout		16,790	79.61	−13.27
Two-candidate-preferred result
Labor	Trish White	11,275	75.60	+17.64
Grey Power	Emily Gilbey-Riley	4,235	27.30	+27.30
Labor hold				

== See also ==
- List of South Australian state by-elections
