= Nick Champion =

Australian politician (born 1972)

The Honourable Nick Champion MP
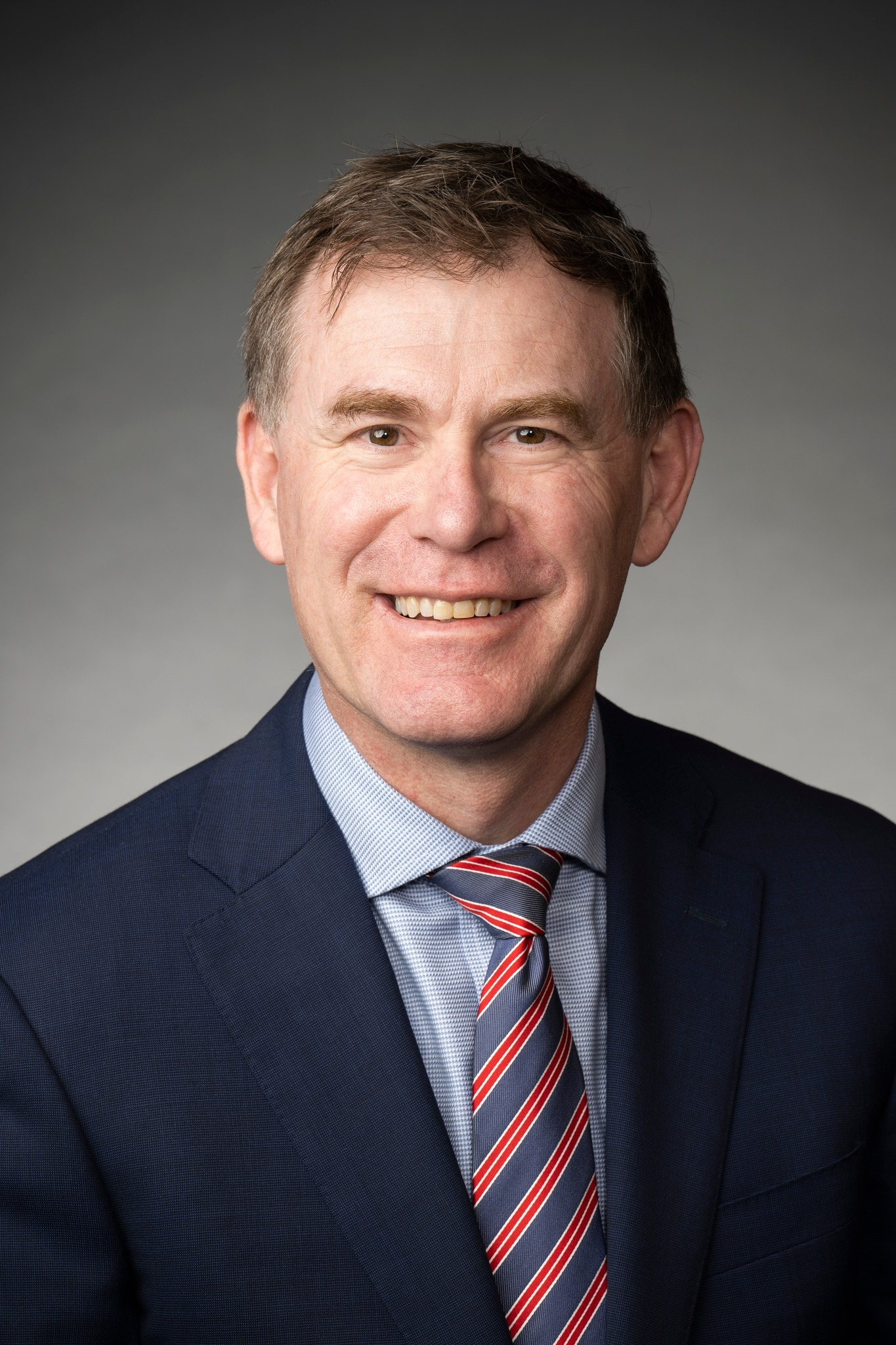
- Official portrait, 2022

Minister for Housing and Urban Development
- Incumbent
- Assumed office 24 March 2022
- Premier: Peter Malinauskas
- Preceded by: Position established

Minister for Planning
- Incumbent
- Assumed office 24 March 2022
- Premier: Peter Malinauskas
- Preceded by: Josh Teague

Minister for Trade and Investment
- In office 24 March 2022 – 15 April 2024
- Premier: Peter Malinauskas
- Preceded by: Stephen Patterson
- Succeeded by: Joe Szakacs

Member of the South Australian House of Assembly for Taylor
- Incumbent
- Assumed office 19 March 2022
- Preceded by: Jon Gee
Federal parliament
Member of the Australian Parliament for Spence
In office 18 May 2019 – 22 February 2022
Preceded by	New seat
Succeeded by	Matt Burnell
Member of the Australian Parliament for Wakefield
In office 24 November 2007 – 18 May 2019
Preceded by	David Fawcett
Succeeded by	Seat abolished

Personal details
- Born: Nicholas David Champion; 27 February 1972 (age 54) Elizabeth, South Australia, Australia
- Party: Australian Labor Party (SA)
- Spouse: Fiona Webber
- Education: University of South Australia
- Occupation: Union official

Nicholas David Champion (born 27 February 1972) is an Australian politician. He is a member of the South Australian Labor Party and has served in the South Australian House of Assembly since the 2022 South Australian state election, representing the seat of Taylor. He has served as the Minister for Trade and Investment, Minister for Housing and Urban Development and Minister for Planning in the Malinauskas ministry since March 2022.

Champion previously served in federal parliament as a Labor Party member in the House of Representatives from 2007 to 2022, first representing the Division of Wakefield until its abolition in 2019, before transferring to the new Division of Spence.

== Early life ==
Champion was born in Elizabeth in South Australia. He spent his early years in the rural town of Kapunda and completed his secondary education at Kapunda High School while working part-time as a fruit picker. He also previously worked as a cleaner, salesman and trolley collector. He completed an Arts degree and a Graduate Diploma in Communication at the University of South Australia.

Champion became a union official at the Shop, Distributive and Allied Employees Association (SDA) in 1994, serving as an organiser, training officer and occupational health and safety officer. He is aligned with the Labor Right.

Champion served as South Australian State President of the Australian Labor Party from 2005 to 2006 and was a ministerial adviser to state Labor Minister Michael Wright.

== Federal parliament ==
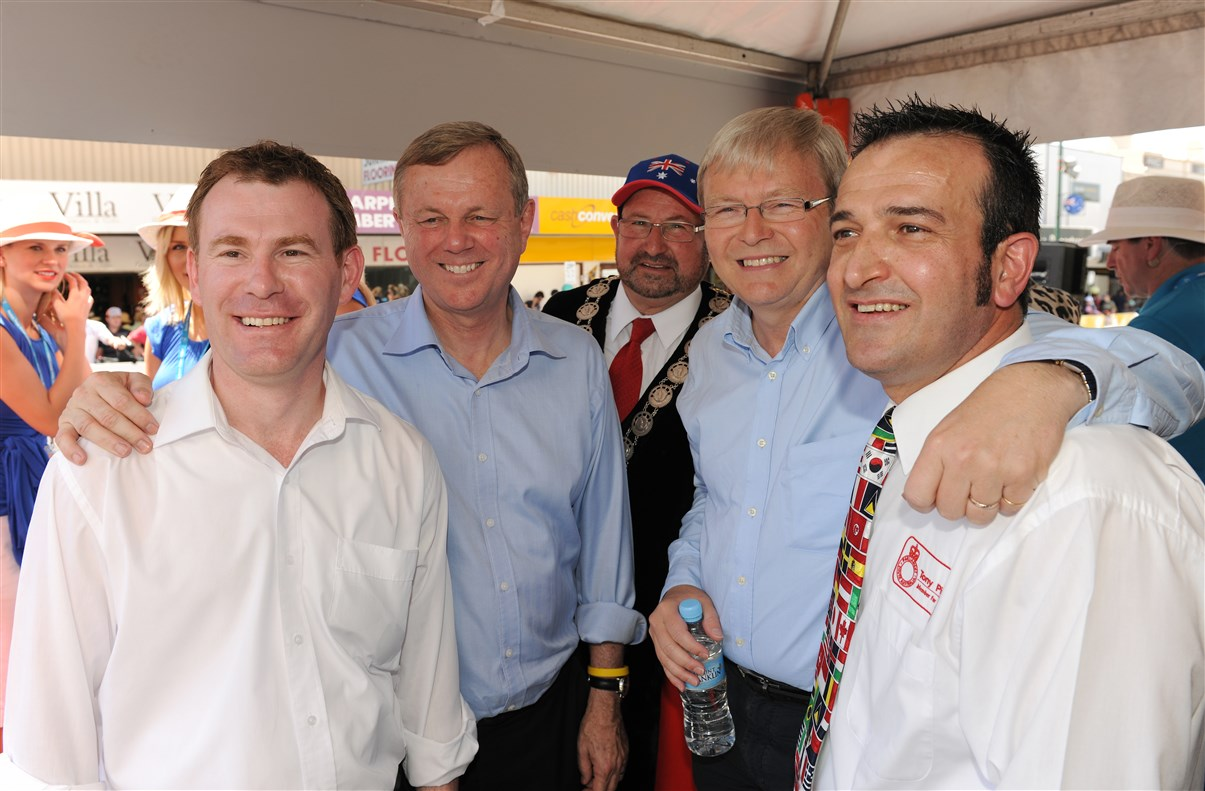
Labor MPs Champion, Mike Rann, Kevin Rudd and Tony Piccolo in Gawler for the Tour Down Under in 2010.

Champion won the seat of Wakefield at the 2007 election, defeating incumbent Liberal Party of Australia member David Fawcett with a 56.6 percent two-party vote. He was the third Labor member to ever win the seat. Champion made it a safe Labor seat on paper at the 2010 election with a 62 percent two-party vote, and became the first Labor member to be re-elected to Wakefield. The South Australian federal redistribution in 2011 had the greatest impact on Wakefield where the Labor margin declined by 1.5 points. Champion retained Wakefield at the 2013 election on a 53.4 percent two-party vote even as Labor lost government, marking the first time the non-Labor parties won government at an election without winning Wakefield. Champion increased his margin at the 2016 election with a 61 percent two-party vote, again making Wakefield a safe Labor seat on paper.

Champion served as a shadow parliamentary secretary (shadow assistant minister from 2016) in Bill Shorten's shadow ministry from 2014 to 2019.

In August 2019, he called for the nationalisation of Port Darwin following its lease to a Chinese-owned company.

== State parliament ==
In 2020, Champion was rumoured to be considering a switch to state parliament, initially through the electoral district of Light in the South Australian House of Assembly, following the release of draft new boundaries that would have left the seat vacant. That plan was thwarted by the final report of the Electoral Districts Boundaries Commission, however Champion was again the topic of speculation in January 2021, this time for the safe seat of Taylor. Both state electorates are covered by Champion's larger federal division of Spence.

On 13 February 2021, Champion was pre-selected for the House of Assembly seat of Taylor for the 2022 South Australian election. On 22 February 2022, he resigned his federal seat of Spence to contest the state election a month later. A by-election in his seat of Spence was not held due to the pending federal election. Taylor was a comfortably safe Labor seat, and Champion easily retained the seat. He was immediately promoted to Cabinet, serving as the Minister for Trade and Investment, Minister for Housing and Urban Development and Minister for Planning in the Malinauskas ministry.

== Personal life ==
Champion is married to Fiona Webber, a former ABC journalist and Chief of Staff to a Federal Labor Minister. They were married in Gibraltar after he proposed in the week of the 2013 election. Their first child was born just over a month after the 2016 election. Nick Champion lives outside of the electoral district of Taylor. He is a resident of North Adelaide.

Parliament of Australia
Preceded by David Fawcett	Member for Wakefield; 2007–2019	Abolished
New seat	Member for Spence; 2019–2022	Succeeded by Matt Burnell
South Australian House of Assembly
Preceded by Jon Gee	Member for Taylor; 2022–present	Incumbent
Political offices
Preceded by Stephen Patterson	Minister for Trade and Investment; 2022–present	Incumbent
New title	Minister for Housing and Urban Development; 2022–present	Incumbent
Preceded by Josh Teague as Minister for Planning and Local Government	Minister for Planning; 2022–present	Incumbent
