= Doris Irene Taylor =

Australian activist

Doris Irene Taylor MBE
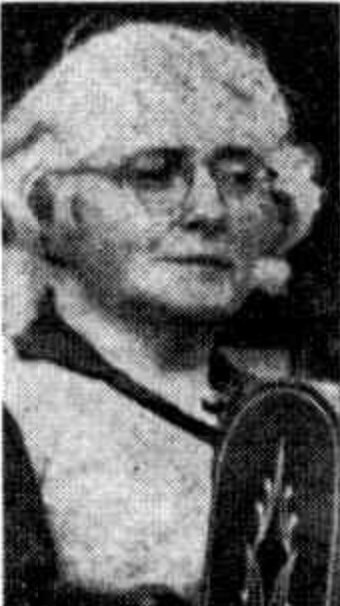
- Doris Irene Taylor, from a 1951 newspaper.
- Born: 25 July 1901; Norwood, South Australia
- Died: 23 May 1968; Adelaide
- Occupation: Social activist
- Known for: Founded Meals on Wheels in Australia (1953)

Doris Irene Taylor MBE (25 July 1901 — 23 May 1968) was an Australian social services activist.

== Early life and education ==
Doris Irene Taylor was born in Norwood, South Australia in 1901, the daughter of Thomas Simpkin Taylor and Angelina Williams Taylor. Her father was a bricklayer. Twice in childhood, she survived falls that caused her a limp and paralysis. In 1925 she was injured in a collision with a car, while her sister Ivy was pushing her wheelchair.

== Career ==
During the 1930s Taylor worked as a secretary and a fundraiser for a mothers' club, and for a soup kitchen. She moved into political work with the Australian Labor Party by the mid-1940s, and directed a survey of housing conditions. Taylor is credited with persuading Don Dunstan to run for the South Australian lower house seat of Norwood in 1952.

Taylor founded Australian Meals on Wheels in South Australia in 1953, and in 1954 the first meal was served from the Port Adelaide kitchen. She worked to include other home-based services for seniors in the organization's offerings, including personal care and library access. Her work for healthier aging was praised by the World Health Organization. She also campaigned for accessible recreation and "a wheelchair for every invalid".

Taylor was appointed M.B.E. in 1959.

== Personal life ==
In addition to the spine and leg injuries that affected her mobility, Taylor had rheumatoid arthritis. She enjoyed learning, and taught herself to speak Russian; she also read twice a week to a blind schoolmaster. In 1951 she began using a motorized wheelchair, saying "Heaven help any bureaucrat who gets in my way now." Taylor died in 1968, in Adelaide, aged 66 years. The South Australian Electoral district of Taylor is named after her.
