= Trish White =

Australian politician

The Honourable Trish White AM

Minister for Science, Transport, Urban Development and Planning
- In office 5 March 2004 – 17 March 2005
- Premier: Mike Rann
- Preceded by: Jane Lomax-Smith
- Succeeded by: Carmel Zollo

Minister for Education and Children's Services
- In office 6 March 2002 – 5 March 2004
- Premier: Mike Rann
- Preceded by: Malcolm Buckby
- Succeeded by: Jane Lomax-Smith

Member of the South Australian House of Assembly for Taylor
- In office 5 November 1994 – 20 March 2010
- Preceded by: Lynn Arnold
- Succeeded by: Leesa Vlahos

Personal details
- Born: Patricia Lynne White; 7 September 1964 (age 62) Brisbane, Queensland, Australia
- Education: University of Queensland
- Occupation: Engineer, company director

Patricia Lynne White AM (born 7 September 1964) is an Australian company director and former politician who served as the member for Taylor in the South Australian House of Assembly, representing the Labor Party. She first won the seat at a state by-election held on 5 November 1994, following the retirement of former premier Lynn Arnold, serving for 16 years. She was a senior cabinet minister in the Rann government.

== Career ==
Born in Brisbane, White gained degrees in Engineering and Arts, from the University of Queensland, after which she worked as an engineering project manager in the transport and communications industries, then with the Defence Science and Technology Organisation.

=== Parliamentary career ===
From 1995 to 2002, White held various Shadow Ministries including Education and Children's Services, Further Education and Training, Higher Education, Regional Development, Tourism, Racing, Sport, Youth, Multicultural and Ethnic Affairs.

When Labor took power in 2002, she became a minister. From 2002 to 2005, White has held Ministries including Education and Children's Services, Member of the Executive Council, Transport, Science and Information Economy, and Urban Development and Planning. She stepped down to spend more time with her young family.

She has been a member of several parliamentary committees, including Chair Economic and Finance, Industry Development, Public Works, Social Development, Select Committee into Building Surveyors / Private Certifiers, Select Committee into DETE funded schools.

The 2006 election saw White increase her margin to 27.4%.

White announced she would not re-contest her seat at the 2010 state election. Labor preselected former Labor assistant secretary Leesa Vlahos who retained the seat.

=== Post-Parliamentary career ===
Post politics, White took up a senior executive role with ASX 50 global engineering services company, WorleyParsons. She has been a non-executive director of several corporations, including Australia Post.

In March 2017, White signed an open letter calling for the Government of South Australia to continue to investigate the "opportunity to develop an international used nuclear fuel management industry" identified by the Nuclear Fuel Cycle Royal Commission in 2015–16.

From 2018 she has been president and board chairman of Engineers Australia, the peak professional body for the engineering profession in Australia.

Parliament of South Australia
Preceded by Lynn Arnold	Member for Taylor; 1994–2010	Succeeded by Leesa Vlahos
