= Carmel Zollo =

Australian politician

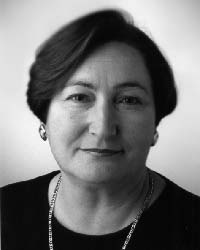
Carmel Zollo

Carmelina "Carmel" Zollo (born 10 January 1952) is an Australian politician, and a Labor Party member of the South Australian Legislative Council from 1997 to 2014. She was re-elected for a second term in 2006. Zollo did not re-contest her seat at the 2014 election.

Zollo was born in Ceppaloni (Benevento) in the Campania Region of Italy. Prior to entering parliament, she worked as a federal and state public servant and political staffer. She was the first Italian born member of the South Australian cabinet.

Throughout her time in parliament, she had held many and varied positions within the government, including: Parliamentary Secretary to the Minister for Agriculture, Food and Fisheries and Mineral Resources Development; Government Whip in the Legislative Council; Convenor – Premier's Food Council; Chair – Issues Group of Food South Australia; Chair – Murray Mallee Strategic Task Force; Chair - South Australian Wine Industry Council Issues Group; Member – South Australian Wine Industry Council; Parliamentary Secretary assisting the Minister for Industry Trade and Regional Development, Minister for Mineral Resources Development, Minister for Small Business; Parliamentary Secretary assisting the: Minister for Industry and Trade, Minister for Mineral Resources Development; Member of Executive Council; Minister for Emergency Services; Minister Assisting in Mental Health; Minister Assisting the Minister for Industry and Trade; Minister Assisting in Regional Health; Minister for Mental Health and Substance Abuse; Minister for Correctional Services; Minister for Road Safety; Minister for Gambling; and Minister assisting the Minister for Multicultural Affairs.

== Personal life ==
Zollo migrated to Australia from Italy in 1957 with her mother. Her father had migrated to Australia five years earlier. Carmel married Lou Zollo in 1973 and the couple raised three children: Alfred, Steven and Dianna.
