= Leesa Vlahos =

Australian politician

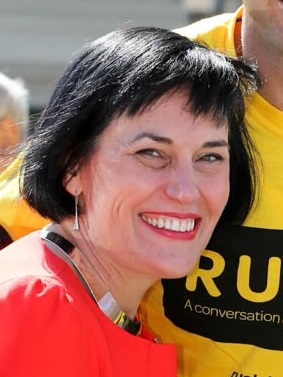

Member of the South Australian Parliament for Taylor
- In office 20 March 2010 – 17 March 2018
- Preceded by: Trish White
- Succeeded by: Jon Gee

Personal details
- Born: Leesa Anne Chesser; 1966 (age 59–60) Townsville, Queensland, Australia
- Party: Australian Labor Party (SA)

Leesa Anne Vlahos, née Chesser (born 1966) is a former Australian politician. She represented the South Australian House of Assembly seat of Taylor for the Labor Party from the 2010 election until her retirement in 2018.

== Background ==
Vlahos was born in Townsville, Queensland. As a child she became a Girl Guide and later continued to be involved with the scouting movement. She studied Health Administration at the Queensland University of Technology. She then worked in public and private hospitals in Brisbane and later the Repatriation Hospital in Daw Park, South Australia. Vlahos was the founding director of SA Progressive Business Inc. which acts as Labor's corporate events arm linking them with the business community.

== Parliament ==
Vlahos was elected to the seat of Taylor after the retirement of the previous Labor member Trish White.

She is a former Presiding Officer of the SA Parliament Public Works Committee, a former member of the Aboriginal Lands Parliamentary Standing Committee, and a former member of the Parliamentary Committee on Occupational Safety, Rehabilitation and Compensation. She was also a member of the Economic and Finance Committee.

She previously held offices as Parliamentary Secretary to the Minister for Health, the Parliamentary Secretary to the Premier and assisted in the portfolio areas of Defence Industries, Veterans’ Affairs, Health, Mental Health and Substance Abuse and The Arts.

Vlahos was described by the Australian Financial Review as 'staunchly pro-nuclear' and advocated for nuclear power in Australia at the time that the Nuclear Fuel Cycle Royal Commission commenced in March 2015. She is aligned with Labor's right faction. In a submission in response to the setting of the commission's Terms of Reference she stated that "for years I have been an advocate for a modern and safe nuclear industry in our State."

=== Oakden Scandal ===
At the 2018 election, Vlahos would have been Labor's first-listed candidate on their upper house ticket, but she quit before the publication of the ICAC report into the Oakden scandal.

=== Cabinet ===
Vlahos' elevation to the Cabinet of South Australia in the Jay Weatherill government occurred in January 2016.

Vlahos represented the following portfolios in the Cabinet of South Australia:

- Minister for Disabilities
- Minister for Mental Health and Substance Abuse

She resigned from Cabinet on 17 September 2017 for personal health reasons, but announced that she intended to remain in the House of Assembly until the March 2018 election

== Post Parliamentary Career ==
After leaving parliament, Leesa became a board member for the following organisations:

- The Australian Physiotherapy Association
- Neami National
- Hen House Co-op
- Community Options Australia
- +Life

During 2022 she joined the Salzburg Global Seminar as part of the "Health and Economic Well-being: Gender Equity in Post-Pandemic Rebuilding" program

South Australian House of Assembly
Preceded by Trish White	Member for Taylor; 2010–2018	Succeeded by Jon Gee
Political offices
Preceded by Tony Piccolo	Minister for Disabilities; 2016–2017	Succeeded by Katrine Hildyard
Preceded by Jack Snelling	Minister for Mental Health & Substance Abuse; 2016–2017	Succeeded by Peter Malinauskas
