= Jon Gee =

Australian politician

Jon Gee MP

Member of the South Australian House of Assembly for Napier
- In office 15 March 2014 – 17 March 2018
- Preceded by: Michael O'Brien
- Succeeded by: Seat abolished

Member of the South Australian House of Assembly for Taylor
- In office 17 March 2018 – 19 March 2022
- Preceded by: Leesa Vlahos
- Succeeded by: Nick Champion

Personal details
- Born: 24 May 1959 (age 67) Harlington, Bedfordshire, England
- Party: Australian Labor Party (SA)
- Children: 3
- Website: jongeemp.com

Jonathan Peter Gee (born 24 May 1959) is a British Australian politician. He has been a Labor member of the South Australian House of Assembly since the 2014 state election, representing Napier until 2018 and Taylor thereafter.

Before his election, Gee had been a secretary of the Australian Manufacturing Workers Union vehicle division and a Labor state president with close connections to the northern suburbs of Adelaide and to Holden.

Gee's seat of Napier was renamed King and the boundaries moved east for the 2018 election, paring Gee's margin from a fairly safe nine percent to an extremely marginal 0.1 percent. Gee opted to transfer to the friendlier seat of Taylor, which received some of the western part of Napier in the redistribution.

Gee announced in late January 2021 that he no longer intended to contest the 2022 South Australian state election. It was rumoured that federal MP Nick Champion would take his place as Champion's previous plan to move to the electoral district of Light fell through.

South Australian House of Assembly
Preceded by Michael O'Brien	Member for Napier; 2014–2018	Abolished
Preceded by Leesa Vlahos	Member for Taylor; 2018–2022	Succeeded by Nick Champion
