= Electoral district of Napier =

Napier South Australia—House of Assembly
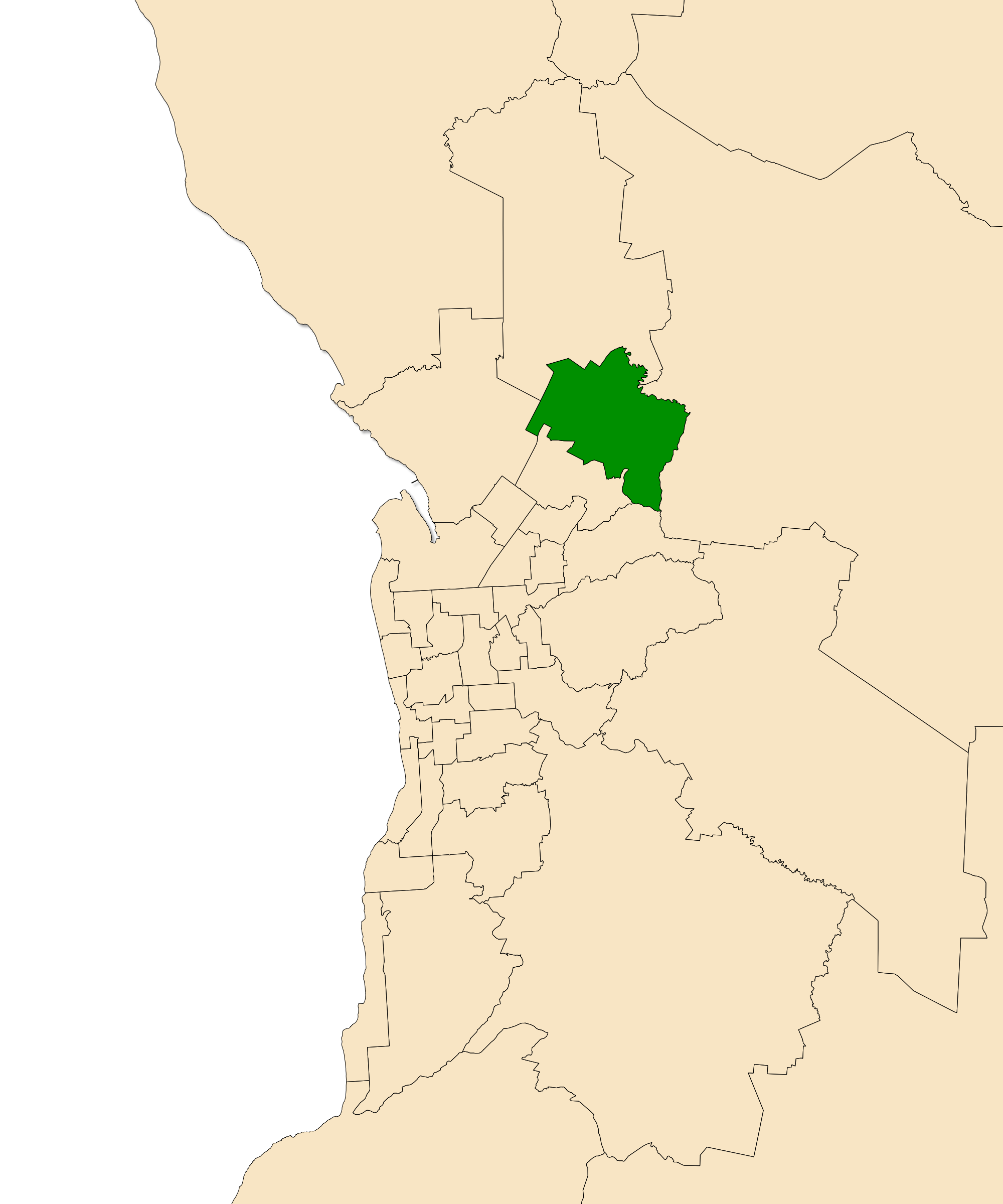
- Electoral district of Napier (green) in the Greater Adelaide area
- State: South Australia
- Created: 1977
- Abolished: 2018
- Namesake: Thomas Napier
- Electors: 23,653 (2014)
- Area: 156.1 km^{2} (60.3 sq mi)
- Demographic: Metropolitan
- Coordinates: 34°41′47″S 138°45′7″E

Napier was an electorate in the South Australian Legislative Assembly in the outer northern suburbs of the Adelaide metropolitan area, including the suburbs of Blakeview, Davoren Park, Elizabeth Downs, Evanston South, Kudla, Munno Para, Smithfield and Smithfield Plains, parts of Craigmore, Evanston Park and Munno Para Downs; as well as semi-rural Bibaringa, One Tree Hill, Sampson Flat, Uleybury and Yattalunga, and part of Humbug Scrub.

Napier was named after Sir Mellis Napier, who was Chief Justice of South Australia for 25 years and a total of 43 years in the Supreme Court.

Though typically a safe Labor seat, at the 1993 election landslide Napier was Labor's most marginal seat on a 1.1 percent margin.

Napier ceased to exist at the 2018 state election. because of a redistribution in 2016. Some of the more central urbanized area of Napier east of the Main North Road was merged with Little Para which was renamed Elizabeth. The portion west of Main North Road was transferred to Taylor and Light. The eastern rural portions became part of King, which the Boundaries Commission reported as the renaming of Napier. The last member for Napier, Jon Gee, transferred to Taylor.

== Members for Napier ==
Member	Party	Term
Terry Hemmings	Labor	1977–1993
Annette Hurley	Labor	1993–2002
Michael O'Brien	Labor	2002–2014
Jon Gee	Labor	2014–2018

== Election results ==
2014 South Australian state election: Napier
Party	Candidate	Votes	%	±%
Labor	Jon Gee	9,689	47.6	−7.2
Liberal	Robert Leggatt	6,206	30.5	+4.0
Family First	Gary Balfort	2,741	13.5	+3.7
Greens	Sam Miles	1,722	8.5	+2.9
Total formal votes		20,358	95.7	−0.0
Informal votes		906	4.3	+0.0
Turnout		21,264	89.9	−1.4
Two-party-preferred result
Labor	Jon Gee	12,024	59.1	−7.1
Liberal	Robert Leggatt	8,334	40.9	+7.1
Labor hold		Swing	−7.1	
