= Electoral district of Taylor =

South Australian state electoral district

Taylor South Australia—House of Assembly
- Interactive map of electoral district boundaries
- State: South Australia
- Created: 1993
- MP: Nick Champion
- Party: Labor
- Namesake: Doris Irene Taylor
- Electors: 29,557 (2026)
- Area: 242.2 km^{2} (93.5 sq mi)
- Demographic: Metropolitan
- Coordinates: 34°41′4″S 138°33′16″E
Electorates around Taylor:
Gulf St Vincent	Ngadjuri	Light
Gulf St Vincent	Taylor	Elizabeth
Port Adelaide	Playford Ramsay	Ramsay

Footnotes
- Electoral District map

Taylor is a single-member electoral district for the South Australian House of Assembly. This district is named after Doris Irene Taylor MBE, a leading force in the founding of Meals on Wheels, and Labor activist. Taylor is a 242.2 km^{2} (93.5 sq mi) semi-urban electorate in Adelaide's outer northern suburbs and market gardens on the Adelaide Northern plains. A large portion of the district lives in the western half of the City of Playford and it is regarded as a safe Labor seat. It now includes the suburbs and townships of Andrews Farm, Angle Vale, Bolivar, Buckland Park, Davoren Park, Edinburgh, Edinburgh North, Elizabeth North, Eyre, MacDonald Park, Munno Para West, Penfield, Penfield Gardens, Riverlea Park, Smithfield, Smithfield Plains, St Kilda, Virginia, and Waterloo Corner.

== History ==
Taylor was created for the 1993 state election between the northern metropolitan seat of Ramsay and rural Goyder, and was won by the defeated Labor Premier Lynn Arnold. He resigned in 1994, triggering a Taylor by-election which saw Trish White retain the seat for Labor.

Following the redistribution of 2003 the northern boundary of the district was Light River and it sketched from Gulf St Vincent in the west to Lewiston and Reeves Plains in the north east, Curtis Road in the City of Playford to the east, to the outer northern suburbs of Burton, Direk and parts of Paralowie and Salisbury North to the south.

Following the 2016 boundary redistribution a major change occurred with approximately 40% of the electors of Taylor from the suburbs of Paralowie and Salisbury North in the City of Salisbury being moved to Ramsay and being replaced by Elizabeth North which was added from the abolished district of Little Para and Davoren Park, Smithfield and Smithfield Plains from the abolished district of Napier, and Angle Vale from the district of Light all from the City of Playford. The previous member for Napier, Jon Gee replaced the retiring member Leesa Vlahos at the 2018 election.

Due to being above the 10% quota threshold the 2020 boundary redistribution, the Gawler River has again become the northern boundary with Port Gawler, Middle Beach and Two Wells within the Adelaide Plains Council moving to a redrawn electoral district of Frome and the southern boundary also changing with the suburbs of Burton, Direk and remaining portion of Salisbury North from the City of Salisbury moving to the electoral district of Ramsay. A portion of Munno Para West within the City of Playford from Light was added.

== Members for Taylor ==
Member	Party	Term
Lynn Arnold	Labor	1993–1994
Trish White	Labor	1994–2010
Leesa Vlahos	Labor	2010–2018
Jon Gee	Labor	2018–2022
Nick Champion	Labor	2022–present

== Election results ==
2026 South Australian state election: Taylor
Party	Candidate	Votes	%	±%
Labor	Nick Champion	9,201	39.7	−13.7
One Nation	Peter Rentoulis	7,956	34.3	+25.5
Greens	Xander Osborne	1,890	8.1	+2.1
Liberal	Ted Boul Hosn	1,870	8.1	−13.0
Family First	Kylie Evans	1,288	5.6	−2.1
Legalise Cannabis	Brett Stephens	725	3.1	+3.1
Australian Family	John Attard	261	1.1	+1.1
Total formal votes		23,191	95.0	+0.2
Informal votes		1,221	5.0	−0.2
Turnout		24,412	82.6	−1.0
Two-candidate-preferred result
Labor	Nick Champion	12,577	54.2	−15.5
One Nation	Peter Rentoulis	10,611	45.8	+45.8
Labor hold				
