= Jennifer Rankine =

Australian politician

The Honourable Jennifer Rankine
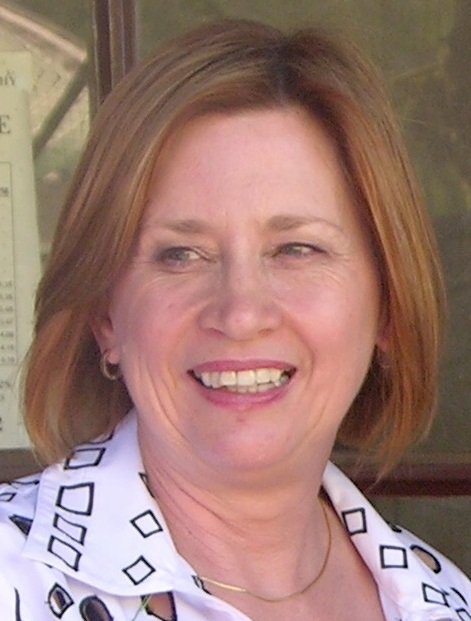

Minister for Education and Child Development
- In office 21 January 2013 – 3 February 2015
- Preceded by: Grace Portolesi
- Succeeded by: Susan Close

Member of the South Australian House of Assembly for Wright
- In office 11 October 1997 – 17 March 2018
- Preceded by: Scott Ashenden
- Succeeded by: Blair Boyer

Personal details
- Born: 22 September 1955 (age 71) Mannum, South Australia, Australia
- Party: Australian Labor Party (SA)
- Domestic partner: Michael Atkinson

Jennifer Mary Rankine (born 22 September 1953) is a former Australian politician. She represented the South Australian House of Assembly seat of Wright for the Australian Labor Party from the 1997 election until her retirement in 2018.

Prior to entering parliament, Rankine was an Australian Services Union workplace delegate for staffers of parliamentary offices.

The 2006 election saw Rankine increase her margin to 15.3 points. As of the 2014 election, Rankine holds Wright with a margin of 3.0 points. Rankine has served in a range of ministerial positions. She is from the Labor Left faction.

Rankine's long-term and current de facto partner is fellow state Labor MP Michael Atkinson.

Rankine announced in February 2017 that she would be retiring from parliament as of the 2018 election.

South Australian House of Assembly
Preceded by Scott Ashenden	Member for Wright; 1997–2018	Succeeded by Blair Boyer
