= Results of the 1997 South Australian state election (House of Assembly) =

South Australian state election, 11 October 1997 House of Assembly << 1993–2002 >>
| Enrolled voters | 1,010,753 | | | | |
| Votes cast | 927,344 | | Turnout | 91.75 | -1.82 |
| Informal votes | 37,430 | | Informal | 4.04 | +0.94 |
Summary of votes by party
| Party | Primary votes | % | Swing | Seats | Change |
| Liberal | 359,509 | 40.40 | -12.41 | 23 | 14 |
| Labor | 312,929 | 35.16 | +4.79 | 21 | + 11 |
| Democrats | 146,347 | 16.45 | +7.35 | 0 | ± 0 |
| National | 15,488 | 1.74 | +0.63 | 1 | + 1 |
| United Australia | 13,569 | 1.52 | +1.52 | 0 | ± 0 |
| Independent | 27,870 | 3.13 | +0.01 | 1 | + 1 |
| Independent Liberal | 6,970 | 0.78 | * | 1 | + 1 |
| Other | 7,232 | 0.81 | * | 0 | ± 0 |
| Total | 889,914 | | | 47 | |
Two-party-preferred
| Liberal | 458,399 | 51.51 | -9.40 | | |
| Labor | 431,515 | 48.49 | +9.40 | | |

This is a list of House of Assembly results for the 1997 South Australian state election.

== Results by electoral district ==
=== Adelaide ===
1997 South Australian state election: Adelaide
| Party | Candidate | Votes | % | ±% |
|---|---|---|---|---|
| Liberal | Michael Armitage | 8,449 | 46.9 | −11.6 |
| Labor | Kate Callaghan | 5,536 | 30.5 | +3.8 |
| Democrats | Sue Meeuwissen | 2,987 | 16.5 | +7.3 |
| Greens | Mark Moran | 1,114 | 6.1 | +6.1 |
| Total formal votes | | 18,136 | 96.5 | −0.8 |
| Informal votes | | 649 | 3.5 | +0.8 |
| Turnout | | 18,785 | 87.4 | |
Two-party-preferred result
| Liberal | Michael Armitage | 10,042 | 55.4 | −8.7 |
| Labor | Kate Callaghan | 8,094 | 44.6 | +8.7 |
| Liberal hold | | Swing | −8.7 | |

=== Bragg ===
1997 South Australian state election: Bragg
| Party | Candidate | Votes | % | ±% |
|---|---|---|---|---|
| Liberal | Graham Ingerson | 11,328 | 60.0 | −13.3 |
| Labor | Anthony Schultz | 3,832 | 20.3 | +5.1 |
| Democrats | Jackie Dearing | 3,712 | 19.7 | +10.6 |
| Total formal votes | | 18,872 | 96.6 | −1.5 |
| Informal votes | | 668 | 3.4 | +1.5 |
| Turnout | | 19,540 | 89.4 | |
Two-party-preferred result
| Liberal | Graham Ingerson | 12,983 | 68.8 | −10.5 |
| Labor | Anthony Schultz | 5,889 | 31.2 | +10.5 |
| Liberal hold | | Swing | −10.5 | |

=== Bright ===
1997 South Australian state election: Bright
| Party | Candidate | Votes | % | ±% |
|---|---|---|---|---|
| Liberal | Wayne Matthew | 9,153 | 47.4 | −15.9 |
| Labor | Kathy Williams | 5,910 | 30.6 | +5.9 |
| Democrats | Fiona Blinco | 4,263 | 22.1 | +10.1 |
| Total formal votes | | 19,326 | 96.3 | −1.6 |
| Informal votes | | 743 | 3.7 | +1.6 |
| Turnout | | 20,069 | 92.6 | |
Two-party-preferred result
| Liberal | Wayne Matthew | 10,844 | 56.1 | −12.2 |
| Labor | Kathy Williams | 8,482 | 43.9 | +12.2 |
| Liberal hold | | Swing | −12.2 | |

=== Chaffey ===
1997 South Australian state election: Chaffey
| Party | Candidate | Votes | % | ±% |
|---|---|---|---|---|
| Liberal | Kent Andrew | 8,133 | 41.7 | +0.6 |
| National | Karlene Maywald | 7,242 | 37.1 | +13.5 |
| Labor | Michael Subacius | 2,734 | 14.0 | +5.5 |
| Democrats | Karrie Lannstrom | 1,399 | 7.2 | +5.7 |
| Total formal votes | | 19,508 | 97.2 | +0.5 |
| Informal votes | | 564 | 2.8 | −0.5 |
| Turnout | | 20,072 | 91.4 | |
Two-party-preferred result
| Liberal | Kent Andrew | 13,841 | 71.0 | −8.0 |
| Labor | Michael Subacius | 5,667 | 29.0 | +8.0 |
Two-candidate-preferred result
| National | Karlene Maywald | 10,252 | 52.6 | +8.9 |
| Liberal | Kent Andrew | 9,256 | 47.4 | −8.9 |
| National gain from Liberal | | Swing | +8.9 | |

=== Coles ===
1997 South Australian state election: Coles
| Party | Candidate | Votes | % | ±% |
|---|---|---|---|---|
| Liberal | Joan Hall | 8,954 | 45.9 | −11.4 |
| Labor | Susan Dawe | 5,957 | 30.5 | +5.6 |
| Democrats | Jonathan Grear | 3,179 | 16.3 | +6.9 |
| Independent | Maria Lynch | 1,432 | 7.3 | +1.1 |
| Total formal votes | | 19,522 | 95.5 | −1.1 |
| Informal votes | | 925 | 4.5 | +1.1 |
| Turnout | | 20,447 | 92.2 | |
Two-party-preferred result
| Liberal | Joan Hall | 11,291 | 57.8 | −9.1 |
| Labor | Susan Dawe | 8,231 | 42.2 | +9.1 |
| Liberal hold | | Swing | −9.1 | |

=== Colton ===
1997 South Australian state election: Colton
| Party | Candidate | Votes | % | ±% |
|---|---|---|---|---|
| Liberal | Steve Condous | 7,690 | 40.1 | −4.4 |
| Labor | Joe Cappella | 6,006 | 31.3 | +6.6 |
| Independent | Bob Randall | 3,225 | 16.8 | −3.3 |
| Democrats | Anna Tree | 2,267 | 11.8 | +6.4 |
| Total formal votes | | 19,188 | 96.8 | +1.0 |
| Informal votes | | 628 | 3.2 | −1.0 |
| Turnout | | 19,816 | 92.0 | |
Two-party-preferred result
| Liberal | Steve Condous | 10,361 | 54.0 | −6.7 |
| Labor | Joe Cappella | 8,827 | 46.0 | +6.7 |
| Liberal hold | | Swing | −6.7 | |

=== Davenport ===
1997 South Australian state election: Davenport
| Party | Candidate | Votes | % | ±% |
|---|---|---|---|---|
| Liberal | Iain Evans | 8,913 | 47.8 | −10.1 |
| Labor | Jillian Bradbury | 4,113 | 22.1 | +9.9 |
| Democrats | Gordon Russell | 3,462 | 18.6 | −7.9 |
| Independent | Bob Marshall | 1,140 | 6.1 | +6.1 |
| Independent | Jack King | 539 | 2.9 | +2.9 |
| Independent | Annie Seaman | 472 | 2.5 | +2.5 |
| Total formal votes | | 18,639 | 96.3 | −1.7 |
| Informal votes | | 715 | 3.7 | +1.7 |
| Turnout | | 19,354 | 91.4 | |
Two-party-preferred result
| Liberal | Iain Evans | 11,883 | 63.8 | −8.5 |
| Labor | Jillian Bradbury | 6,756 | 36.2 | +8.5 |
Two-candidate-preferred result
| Liberal | Iain Evans | 10,115 | 54.3 | −5.9 |
| Democrats | Gordon Russell | 8,524 | 45.7 | +5.9 |
| Liberal hold | | Swing | −5.9 | |

=== Elder ===
1997 South Australian state election: Elder
| Party | Candidate | Votes | % | ±% |
|---|---|---|---|---|
| Liberal | David Wade | 6,455 | 35.8 | −12.1 |
| Labor | Patrick Conlon | 6,192 | 34.3 | −3.0 |
| Democrats | Chris Kennedy | 2,262 | 12.5 | +4.2 |
| Independent | Bruce Hull | 1,360 | 7.5 | +7.5 |
| Independent | Jo Stokes | 698 | 3.9 | +3.9 |
| Independent | George Apap | 671 | 3.7 | +3.7 |
| United Australia | Robert Low | 417 | 2.3 | +2.3 |
| Total formal votes | | 18,055 | 94.2 | −1.2 |
| Informal votes | | 1,121 | 5.8 | +1.2 |
| Turnout | | 19,176 | 91.5 | |
Two-party-preferred result
| Labor | Patrick Conlon | 9,493 | 52.6 | +6.1 |
| Liberal | David Wade | 8,562 | 47.4 | −6.1 |
| Labor gain from Liberal | | Swing | +6.1 | |

=== Elizabeth ===
1997 South Australian state election: Elizabeth
| Party | Candidate | Votes | % | ±% |
|---|---|---|---|---|
| Labor | Lea Stevens | 10,282 | 51.8 | +10.9 |
| Liberal | Angus Bristow | 5,703 | 28.7 | −8.9 |
| Democrats | Michael Pilling | 3,857 | 19.4 | +11.3 |
| Total formal votes | | 19,842 | 95.8 | −0.9 |
| Informal votes | | 878 | 4.2 | +0.9 |
| Turnout | | 20,720 | 92.3 | |
Two-party-preferred result
| Labor | Lea Stevens | 12,764 | 64.3 | +11.5 |
| Liberal | Angus Bristow | 7,078 | 35.7 | −11.5 |
| Labor hold | | Swing | +11.5 | |

=== Finniss ===
1997 South Australian state election: Finniss
| Party | Candidate | Votes | % | ±% |
|---|---|---|---|---|
| Liberal | Dean Brown | 10,519 | 55.4 | −13.3 |
| Democrats | John Lavers | 4,471 | 23.5 | +12.9 |
| Labor | David Detchon | 4,007 | 21.1 | +4.9 |
| Total formal votes | | 18,997 | 96.1 | −1.5 |
| Informal votes | | 769 | 3.9 | +1.5 |
| Turnout | | 19,766 | 92.6 | |
Two-party-preferred result
| Liberal | Dean Brown | 12,523 | 65.9 | −9.4 |
| Labor | David Detchon | 6,474 | 34.1 | +9.4 |
Two-candidate-preferred result
| Liberal | Dean Brown | 10,890 | 57.3 | −18.1 |
| Democrats | John Lavers | 8,107 | 42.7 | +42.7 |
| Liberal hold | | Swing | N/A | |

=== Fisher ===
1997 South Australian state election: Fisher
| Party | Candidate | Votes | % | ±% |
|---|---|---|---|---|
| Liberal | Bob Such | 10,225 | 49.5 | −14.8 |
| Labor | Tania Farrell | 5,849 | 28.3 | +6.0 |
| Democrats | Debbie Jones | 4,593 | 22.2 | +10.7 |
| Total formal votes | | 20,667 | 96.6 | −1.1 |
| Informal votes | | 728 | 3.4 | +1.1 |
| Turnout | | 21,395 | 93.0 | |
Two-party-preferred result
| Liberal | Bob Such | 12,361 | 59.8 | −10.9 |
| Labor | Tania Farrell | 8,306 | 40.2 | +10.9 |
| Liberal hold | | Swing | −10.9 | |

=== Flinders ===
1997 South Australian state election: Flinders
| Party | Candidate | Votes | % | ±% |
|---|---|---|---|---|
| Liberal | Liz Penfold | 10,473 | 53.6 | −1.8 |
| National | Peter Blacker | 4,904 | 25.1 | −0.9 |
| Labor | Manuel Chrisan | 2,114 | 10.8 | −0.8 |
| Democrats | Kime Pedler | 1,219 | 6.2 | +2.0 |
| United Australia | John Kroezen | 829 | 4.2 | +4.2 |
| Total formal votes | | 19,539 | 97.6 | −0.6 |
| Informal votes | | 471 | 2.4 | +0.6 |
| Turnout | | 20,010 | 91.8 | |
Two-party-preferred result
| Liberal | Liz Penfold | 15,331 | 78.5 | −1.9 |
| Labor | Manuel Chrisan | 4,208 | 21.5 | +1.9 |
Two-candidate-preferred result
| Liberal | Liz Penfold | 11,715 | 60.0 | +0.6 |
| National | Peter Blacker | 7,824 | 40.0 | −0.6 |
| Liberal hold | | Swing | +0.6 | |

=== Florey ===
1997 South Australian state election: Florey
| Party | Candidate | Votes | % | ±% |
|---|---|---|---|---|
| Liberal | Sam Bass | 7,449 | 38.2 | −16.7 |
| Labor | Frances Bedford | 7,085 | 36.3 | +4.4 |
| Democrats | Steve Bartholomew | 3,113 | 16.0 | +5.4 |
| Independent | Michael Wohltmann | 871 | 4.5 | +4.5 |
| Independent | Snowy Burns | 650 | 3.3 | +3.3 |
| United Australia | Stan Batten | 332 | 1.7 | −0.7 |
| Total formal votes | | 19,500 | 95.1 | −2.0 |
| Informal votes | | 996 | 4.9 | +2.0 |
| Turnout | | 20,496 | 92.8 | |
Two-party-preferred result
| Labor | Frances Bedford | 10,012 | 51.3 | +12.3 |
| Liberal | Sam Bass | 9,488 | 48.7 | −12.3 |
| Labor gain from Liberal | | Swing | +12.3 | |

=== Frome ===
1997 South Australian state election: Frome
| Party | Candidate | Votes | % | ±% |
|---|---|---|---|---|
| Liberal | Rob Kerin | 8,884 | 45.4 | −8.4 |
| Labor | Colin McGavisk | 6,945 | 35.5 | −2.4 |
| Democrats | Marcus Reseigh | 2,111 | 10.8 | +4.7 |
| United Australia | Ian Gray | 1,648 | 8.4 | +8.4 |
| Total formal votes | | 19,588 | 96.8 | −1.1 |
| Informal votes | | 647 | 3.2 | +1.1 |
| Turnout | | 20,235 | 94.0 | |
Two-party-preferred result
| Liberal | Rob Kerin | 10,368 | 52.9 | −5.3 |
| Labor | Colin McGavisk | 9,220 | 47.1 | +5.3 |
| Liberal hold | | Swing | −5.3 | |

=== Giles ===
1997 South Australian state election: Giles
| Party | Candidate | Votes | % | ±% |
|---|---|---|---|---|
| Labor | Lyn Breuer | 8,734 | 48.1 | +7.4 |
| Liberal | Terry Stephens | 5,361 | 29.5 | −3.2 |
| Democrats | Clint Garrett | 3,041 | 16.7 | +5.4 |
| United Australia | Terry Sotos | 1,026 | 5.6 | +5.6 |
| Total formal votes | | 18,162 | 96.7 | −0.9 |
| Informal votes | | 616 | 3.3 | +0.9 |
| Turnout | | 18,778 | 86.8 | |
Two-party-preferred result
| Labor | Lyn Breuer | 11,159 | 61.4 | +7.0 |
| Liberal | Terry Stephens | 7,003 | 38.6 | −7.0 |
| Labor hold | | Swing | +7.0 | |

=== Gordon ===
1997 South Australian state election: Gordon
| Party | Candidate | Votes | % | ±% |
|---|---|---|---|---|
| Liberal | Scott Dixon | 8,360 | 41.5 | −26.7 |
| Independent | Rory McEwen | 4,530 | 22.5 | +22.5 |
| Labor | Andrew Godfrey | 4,344 | 21.6 | −2.3 |
| Democrats | Simon Mill | 2,382 | 11.8 | +6.8 |
| Independent | Bronte Whelan | 518 | 2.6 | −0.2 |
| Total formal votes | | 20,134 | 96.7 | −1.2 |
| Informal votes | | 679 | 3.3 | +1.2 |
| Turnout | | 20,813 | 92.9 | |
Two-party-preferred result
| Liberal | Scott Dixon | 12,543 | 62.3 | −9.2 |
| Labor | Andrew Godfrey | 7,591 | 37.7 | +9.2 |
Two-candidate-preferred result
| Independent | Rory McEwen | 10,093 | 50.1 | +50.1 |
| Liberal | Scott Dixon | 10,041 | 49.9 | −21.6 |
| Independent gain from Liberal | | Swing | N/A | |

=== Goyder ===
1997 South Australian state election: Goyder
| Party | Candidate | Votes | % | ±% |
|---|---|---|---|---|
| Liberal | John Meier | 10,617 | 55.2 | −14.0 |
| Labor | Chris Snewin | 4,397 | 22.8 | −0.4 |
| Democrats | Colleen Kenny | 2,595 | 13.5 | +5.9 |
| National | Andrew Runeckles | 1,634 | 8.5 | +8.5 |
| Total formal votes | | 19,243 | 95.6 | −2.3 |
| Informal votes | | 884 | 4.4 | +2.3 |
| Turnout | | 20,127 | 94.4 | |
Two-party-preferred result
| Liberal | John Meier | 12,939 | 67.2 | −5.3 |
| Labor | Chris Snewin | 6,304 | 32.8 | +5.3 |
| Liberal hold | | Swing | −5.3 | |

=== Hammond ===
1997 South Australian state election: Hammond
| Party | Candidate | Votes | % | ±% |
|---|---|---|---|---|
| Liberal | Peter Lewis | 9,677 | 51.4 | −18.8 |
| Labor | Michael Young | 3,820 | 20.3 | +1.1 |
| Democrats | Brian Haddy | 3,405 | 18.1 | +8.0 |
| United Australia | Keith Steinborner | 1,928 | 10.2 | +10.2 |
| Total formal votes | | 18,830 | 96.4 | −1.0 |
| Informal votes | | 703 | 3.6 | +1.0 |
| Turnout | | 19,533 | 92.9 | |
Two-party-preferred result
| Liberal | Peter Lewis | 12,192 | 64.7 | −10.4 |
| Labor | Michael Young | 6,638 | 35.3 | +10.4 |
| Liberal hold | | Swing | −10.4 | |

=== Hanson ===
1997 South Australian state election: Hanson
| Party | Candidate | Votes | % | ±% |
|---|---|---|---|---|
| Liberal | Stewart Leggett | 5,837 | 32.1 | −15.1 |
| Labor | Steph Key | 5,773 | 31.7 | −8.0 |
| Independent | John Trainer | 3,468 | 19.1 | +19.1 |
| Democrats | Pat Macaskill | 1,871 | 10.3 | +2.7 |
| Independent | Mark Eckermann | 734 | 4.0 | +4.0 |
| Independent | Dean Le Poidevin | 344 | 1.9 | +1.9 |
| United Australia | Aleksander Wacyk | 176 | 1.0 | +1.0 |
| Total formal votes | | 18,203 | 94.3 | −1.8 |
| Informal votes | | 1,110 | 5.7 | +1.8 |
| Turnout | | 19,313 | 90.6 | |
Two-party-preferred result
| Labor | Steph Key | 10,128 | 55.6 | +7.5 |
| Liberal | Stewart Leggett | 8,075 | 44.4 | −7.5 |
| Labor gain from Liberal | | Swing | +7.5 | |

=== Hart ===
1997 South Australian state election: Hart
| Party | Candidate | Votes | % | ±% |
|---|---|---|---|---|
| Labor | Kevin Foley | 11,847 | 63.2 | +21.6 |
| Liberal | Adam Kealley | 4,052 | 21.6 | −9.6 |
| Democrats | Robert Fisher | 2,842 | 15.2 | +8.6 |
| Total formal votes | | 18,741 | 96.0 | +1.2 |
| Informal votes | | 783 | 4.0 | −1.2 |
| Turnout | | 19,524 | 91.8 | |
Two-party-preferred result
| Labor | Kevin Foley | 13,620 | 72.7 | +14.0 |
| Liberal | Adam Kealley | 5,121 | 27.3 | −14.0 |
| Labor hold | | Swing | +14.0 | |

=== Hartley ===
1997 South Australian state election: Hartley
| Party | Candidate | Votes | % | ±% |
|---|---|---|---|---|
| Liberal | Joe Scalzi | 8,096 | 43.6 | −12.8 |
| Labor | Quentin Black | 7,168 | 38.6 | +7.6 |
| Democrats | Ian Richards | 3,304 | 17.8 | +9.2 |
| Total formal votes | | 18,568 | 96.0 | −0.4 |
| Informal votes | | 780 | 4.0 | +0.4 |
| Turnout | | 19,348 | 91.3 | |
Two-party-preferred result
| Liberal | Joe Scalzi | 9,376 | 50.5 | −11.7 |
| Labor | Quentin Black | 9,192 | 49.5 | +11.7 |
| Liberal hold | | Swing | −11.7 | |

=== Heysen ===
1997 South Australian state election: Heysen
| Party | Candidate | Votes | % | ±% |
|---|---|---|---|---|
| Liberal | David Wotton | 9,723 | 50.4 | −15.3 |
| Democrats | Susan Scrymgour | 5,643 | 29.2 | +17.9 |
| Labor | Tom Kenyon | 3,938 | 20.4 | +4.9 |
| Total formal votes | | 19,304 | 96.8 | −1.3 |
| Informal votes | | 632 | 3.2 | +1.3 |
| Turnout | | 19,936 | 92.1 | |
Two-party-preferred result
| Liberal | David Wotton | 11,997 | 62.1 | −12.3 |
| Labor | Tom Kenyon | 7,307 | 37.9 | +12.3 |
Two-candidate-preferred result
| Liberal | David Wotton | 10,051 | 52.1 | −22.4 |
| Democrats | Susan Scrymgour | 9,253 | 47.9 | +47.9 |
| Liberal hold | | Swing | N/A | |

=== Kaurna ===
1997 South Australian state election: Kaurna
| Party | Candidate | Votes | % | ±% |
|---|---|---|---|---|
| Labor | John Hill | 7,783 | 42.3 | +5.3 |
| Liberal | Lorraine Rosenberg | 6,527 | 35.5 | −9.4 |
| Democrats | Dennis Domey | 2,262 | 12.3 | +6.5 |
| Independent | Mick Krieg | 986 | 5.4 | +5.4 |
| Independent | Barbara Fraser | 579 | 3.1 | +3.1 |
| United Australia | Malcolm Shaw | 264 | 1.4 | +1.4 |
| Total formal votes | | 18,401 | 95.7 | −0.3 |
| Informal votes | | 832 | 4.3 | +0.3 |
| Turnout | | 19,233 | 92.3 | |
Two-party-preferred result
| Labor | John Hill | 10,270 | 55.8 | +8.2 |
| Liberal | Lorraine Rosenberg | 8,131 | 44.2 | −8.2 |
| Labor gain from Liberal | | Swing | +8.2 | |

=== Kavel ===
1997 South Australian state election: Kavel
| Party | Candidate | Votes | % | ±% |
|---|---|---|---|---|
| Liberal | John Olsen | 9,691 | 52.3 | −13.8 |
| Democrats | Cathi Tucker-Lee | 4,306 | 23.2 | +12.9 |
| Labor | Robert Kieselbach | 3,686 | 19.9 | +1.9 |
| United Australia | Evan Trousse | 852 | 4.6 | +4.6 |
| Total formal votes | | 18,535 | 95.8 | −1.5 |
| Informal votes | | 803 | 4.2 | +1.5 |
| Turnout | | 19,338 | 91.5 | |
Two-party-preferred result
| Liberal | John Olsen | 12,039 | 65.0 | −9.1 |
| Labor | Robert Kieselbach | 6,496 | 35.0 | +9.1 |
Two-candidate-preferred result
| Liberal | John Olsen | 10,437 | 56.3 | −17.7 |
| Democrats | Cathi Tucker-Lee | 8,098 | 43.7 | +43.7 |
| Liberal hold | | Swing | N/A | |

=== Lee ===
1997 South Australian state election: Lee
| Party | Candidate | Votes | % | ±% |
|---|---|---|---|---|
| Labor | Michael Wright | 8,545 | 45.7 | +3.5 |
| Liberal | Joe Rossi | 5,977 | 32.0 | −15.3 |
| Democrats | Peter Clements | 2,194 | 11.7 | +7.1 |
| Independent | Carlo Meschino | 905 | 4.8 | +4.8 |
| Independent | Lorraine O'Connor | 560 | 3.0 | +3.0 |
| Independent | Bernhard Cotton | 290 | 1.6 | +0.4 |
| United Australia | Frank Fonovic | 218 | 1.2 | +1.2 |
| Total formal votes | | 18,689 | 94.1 | −0.9 |
| Informal votes | | 1,176 | 5.9 | +0.9 |
| Turnout | | 19,865 | 91.9 | |
Two-party-preferred result
| Labor | Michael Wright | 10,666 | 57.1 | +8.1 |
| Liberal | Joe Rossi | 8,023 | 42.9 | −8.1 |
| Labor gain from Liberal | | Swing | +8.1 | |

=== Light ===
1997 South Australian state election: Light
| Party | Candidate | Votes | % | ±% |
|---|---|---|---|---|
| Liberal | Malcolm Buckby | 9,133 | 47.3 | −12.7 |
| Labor | Pauline Gill | 5,917 | 30.7 | +3.1 |
| Democrats | Kate Reynolds | 4,249 | 22.0 | +10.4 |
| Total formal votes | | 19,299 | 95.6 | −1.5 |
| Informal votes | | 892 | 4.4 | +1.5 |
| Turnout | | 20,191 | 93.0 | |
Two-party-preferred result
| Liberal | Malcolm Buckby | 10,862 | 56.3 | −8.9 |
| Labor | Pauline Gill | 8,437 | 43.7 | +8.9 |
| Liberal hold | | Swing | −8.9 | |

=== MacKillop ===
1997 South Australian state election: MacKillop
| Party | Candidate | Votes | % | ±% |
|---|---|---|---|---|
| Liberal | Dale Baker | 7,170 | 35.5 | −35.7 |
| Independent | Mitch Williams | 5,830 | 28.9 | +28.9 |
| Labor | Kiley Rogers | 3,116 | 15.4 | −1.4 |
| National | Anne Hayes | 1,708 | 8.5 | +8.5 |
| Democrats | Gen Netherton | 1,008 | 5.0 | −1.5 |
| United Australia | Don McInnes | 767 | 3.8 | +3.8 |
| Call to Australia | Philip Cornish | 577 | 2.9 | −2.6 |
| Total formal votes | | 20,176 | 96.6 | −1.7 |
| Informal votes | | 701 | 3.4 | +1.7 |
| Turnout | | 20,877 | 92.6 | |
Two-party-preferred result
| Liberal | Dale Baker | 14,300 | 70.9 | −8.5 |
| Labor | Kiley Rogers | 5,876 | 29.1 | +8.5 |
Two-candidate-preferred result
| Independent | Mitch Williams | 11,679 | 57.9 | +57.9 |
| Liberal | Dale Baker | 8,497 | 42.1 | −37.3 |
| Independent gain from Liberal | | Swing | N/A | |

=== Mawson ===
1997 South Australian state election: Mawson
| Party | Candidate | Votes | % | ±% |
|---|---|---|---|---|
| Liberal | Robert Brokenshire | 9,031 | 46.2 | −6.4 |
| Labor | John McInnes | 6,599 | 33.7 | +2.3 |
| Democrats | Graham Pratt | 3,930 | 20.1 | +13.1 |
| Total formal votes | | 19,560 | 96.0 | −0.9 |
| Informal votes | | 815 | 4.0 | +0.9 |
| Turnout | | 20,375 | 93.2 | |
Two-party-preferred result
| Liberal | Robert Brokenshire | 10,695 | 54.7 | −4.6 |
| Labor | John McInnes | 8,865 | 45.3 | +4.6 |
| Liberal hold | | Swing | −4.6 | |

=== Mitchell ===
1997 South Australian state election: Mitchell
| Party | Candidate | Votes | % | ±% |
|---|---|---|---|---|
| Liberal | Colin Caudell | 7,673 | 40.2 | −11.7 |
| Labor | Kris Hanna | 7,411 | 38.8 | +6.3 |
| Democrats | Lawrence Wapnah | 3,074 | 16.1 | +6.8 |
| Independent | Daniel Elsley | 936 | 4.9 | +4.9 |
| Total formal votes | | 19,094 | 96.4 | −0.1 |
| Informal votes | | 703 | 3.6 | +0.1 |
| Turnout | | 19,797 | 93.4 | |
Two-party-preferred result
| Labor | Kris Hanna | 9,710 | 50.9 | +10.3 |
| Liberal | Colin Caudell | 9,384 | 49.1 | −10.3 |
| Labor gain from Liberal | | Swing | +10.3 | |

=== Morphett ===
1997 South Australian state election: Morphett
| Party | Candidate | Votes | % | ±% |
|---|---|---|---|---|
| Liberal | John Oswald | 10,069 | 54.8 | −11.2 |
| Labor | Stephen Graney | 5,002 | 27.2 | +4.3 |
| Democrats | Danny Carroll | 3,313 | 18.0 | +10.6 |
| Total formal votes | | 18,384 | 96.5 | −0.8 |
| Informal votes | | 659 | 3.5 | +0.8 |
| Turnout | | 19,043 | 90.2 | |
Two-party-preferred result
| Liberal | John Oswald | 11,591 | 63.0 | −9.4 |
| Labor | Stephen Graney | 6,793 | 37.0 | +9.4 |
| Liberal hold | | Swing | −9.4 | |

=== Napier ===
1997 South Australian state election: Napier
| Party | Candidate | Votes | % | ±% |
|---|---|---|---|---|
| Labor | Annette Hurley | 10,031 | 56.1 | +17.5 |
| Democrats | Don Knott | 4,055 | 22.7 | +15.5 |
| Liberal | Rena Zurawel | 3,798 | 21.2 | −10.2 |
| Total formal votes | | 17,884 | 95.4 | +0.1 |
| Informal votes | | 853 | 4.6 | −0.1 |
| Turnout | | 18,737 | 92.0 | |
Two-party-preferred result
| Labor | Annette Hurley | 12,718 | 71.1 | +14.6 |
| Liberal | Rena Zurawel | 5,166 | 28.9 | −14.6 |
Two-candidate-preferred result
| Labor | Annette Hurley | 10,642 | 59.5 | +3.0 |
| Democrats | Don Knott | 7,242 | 40.5 | +40.5 |
| Labor hold | | Swing | N/A | |

=== Newland ===
1997 South Australian state election: Newland
| Party | Candidate | Votes | % | ±% |
|---|---|---|---|---|
| Liberal | Dorothy Kotz | 9,268 | 47.5 | −13.2 |
| Labor | Michael Regan | 6,009 | 30.8 | +4.9 |
| Democrats | Louise Armstrong-Quince | 4,223 | 21.7 | +11.6 |
| Total formal votes | | 19,500 | 95.8 | −1.7 |
| Informal votes | | 852 | 4.2 | +1.7 |
| Turnout | | 20,352 | 93.1 | |
Two-party-preferred result
| Liberal | Dorothy Kotz | 11,305 | 58.0 | −8.7 |
| Labor | Michael Regan | 8,195 | 42.0 | +8.7 |
| Liberal hold | | Swing | −8.7 | |

=== Norwood ===
1997 South Australian state election: Norwood
| Party | Candidate | Votes | % | ±% |
|---|---|---|---|---|
| Liberal | John Cummins | 7,732 | 42.5 | −8.6 |
| Labor | Vini Ciccarello | 7,128 | 39.2 | +5.4 |
| Democrats | Keith Oehme | 2,215 | 12.2 | −0.2 |
| Greens | Michelle Drummond | 796 | 4.4 | +4.4 |
| United Australia | Kevin Duffy | 316 | 1.7 | +1.7 |
| Total formal votes | | 18,187 | 95.9 | −1.1 |
| Informal votes | | 775 | 4.1 | +1.1 |
| Turnout | | 18,962 | 89.4 | |
Two-party-preferred result
| Labor | Vini Ciccarello | 9,244 | 50.8 | +8.2 |
| Liberal | John Cummins | 8,943 | 49.2 | −8.2 |
| Labor gain from Liberal | | Swing | +8.2 | |

=== Peake ===
1997 South Australian state election: Peake
| Party | Candidate | Votes | % | ±% |
|---|---|---|---|---|
| Labor | Tom Koutsantonis | 8,804 | 46.7 | +15.1 |
| Liberal | Graham Parry | 6,998 | 37.1 | −9.2 |
| Democrats | Sharon Robertson | 3,067 | 16.3 | +12.4 |
| Total formal votes | | 18,869 | 95.9 | +0.6 |
| Informal votes | | 804 | 4.1 | −0.6 |
| Turnout | | 19,673 | 92.1 | |
Two-party-preferred result
| Labor | Tom Koutsantonis | 10,747 | 57.0 | +12.0 |
| Liberal | Graham Parry | 8,122 | 43.0 | −12.0 |
| Labor gain from Liberal | | Swing | +12.0 | |

=== Playford ===
1997 South Australian state election: Playford
| Party | Candidate | Votes | % | ±% |
|---|---|---|---|---|
| Labor | Jack Snelling | 9,464 | 48.8 | +5.6 |
| Liberal | Peter Panagaris | 5,498 | 28.4 | −13.6 |
| Democrats | Mal Cummings | 3,545 | 18.3 | +10.3 |
| United Australia | Bexley Carman | 876 | 4.5 | +4.5 |
| Total formal votes | | 19,383 | 95.2 | −1.3 |
| Informal votes | | 975 | 4.8 | +1.3 |
| Turnout | | 20,358 | 93.0 | |
Two-party-preferred result
| Labor | Jack Snelling | 12,200 | 62.9 | +10.8 |
| Liberal | Peter Panagaris | 7,183 | 37.1 | −10.8 |
| Labor hold | | Swing | +10.8 | |

=== Price ===
1997 South Australian state election: Price
| Party | Candidate | Votes | % | ±% |
|---|---|---|---|---|
| Labor | Murray De Laine | 11,314 | 63.4 | +10.7 |
| Liberal | Amber Del Pin | 3,456 | 19.4 | −13.5 |
| Democrats | Phillip Thomas | 3,078 | 17.2 | +9.2 |
| Total formal votes | | 17,848 | 95.3 | −0.5 |
| Informal votes | | 878 | 4.7 | +0.5 |
| Turnout | | 18,726 | 89.8 | |
Two-party-preferred result
| Labor | Murray De Laine | 13,279 | 74.4 | +13.4 |
| Liberal | Amber Del Pin | 4,569 | 25.6 | −13.4 |
| Labor hold | | Swing | +13.4 | |

=== Ramsay ===
1997 South Australian state election: Ramsay
| Party | Candidate | Votes | % | ±% |
|---|---|---|---|---|
| Labor | Mike Rann | 9,757 | 55.0 | +0.7 |
| Liberal | Phil Newton | 4,011 | 22.6 | −12.3 |
| Democrats | Matilda Bawden | 2,835 | 16.0 | +5.3 |
| United Australia | Wayne Schultz | 569 | 3.2 | +3.2 |
| National Action | Tony Michalski | 553 | 3.1 | +3.1 |
| Total formal votes | | 17,725 | 94.3 | −2.1 |
| Informal votes | | 1,062 | 5.7 | +2.1 |
| Turnout | | 18,787 | 92.5 | |
Two-party-preferred result
| Labor | Mike Rann | 12,086 | 68.2 | +7.9 |
| Liberal | Phil Newton | 5,639 | 31.8 | −7.9 |
| Labor hold | | Swing | +7.9 | |

=== Reynell ===
1997 South Australian state election: Reynell
| Party | Candidate | Votes | % | ±% |
|---|---|---|---|---|
| Labor | Gay Thompson | 6,970 | 36.1 | −1.8 |
| Liberal | Julie Greig | 6,969 | 36.1 | −10.4 |
| Democrats | Greg Thomas | 3,522 | 18.2 | +8.7 |
| Independent | Cathy Crago | 1,151 | 6.0 | +6.0 |
| Independent | Dan Moriarty | 707 | 3.7 | +3.7 |
| Total formal votes | | 19,319 | 95.1 | −1.7 |
| Informal votes | | 993 | 4.9 | +1.7 |
| Turnout | | 20,312 | 91.9 | |
Two-party-preferred result
| Labor | Gay Thompson | 10,381 | 53.7 | +6.2 |
| Liberal | Julie Greig | 8,938 | 46.3 | −6.2 |
| Labor gain from Liberal | | Swing | +6.2 | |

=== Ross Smith ===
1997 South Australian state election: Ross Smith
| Party | Candidate | Votes | % | ±% |
|---|---|---|---|---|
| Labor | Ralph Clarke | 8,905 | 51.2 | +9.7 |
| Liberal | Danny McGuire | 4,712 | 27.1 | −14.8 |
| Democrats | John Woods | 3,055 | 17.6 | +1.1 |
| United Australia | David Shelly | 704 | 4.1 | +4.1 |
| Total formal votes | | 17,376 | 95.2 | −1.0 |
| Informal votes | | 870 | 4.8 | +1.0 |
| Turnout | | 18,246 | 91.1 | |
Two-party-preferred result
| Labor | Ralph Clarke | 11,253 | 64.8 | +12.7 |
| Liberal | Danny McGuire | 6,123 | 35.2 | −12.7 |
| Labor hold | | Swing | +12.7 | |

=== Schubert ===
1997 South Australian state election: Schubert
| Party | Candidate | Votes | % | ±% |
|---|---|---|---|---|
| Liberal | Ivan Venning | 10,416 | 52.6 | −15.3 |
| Democrats | Pam Kelly | 4,270 | 21.6 | +12.1 |
| Labor | Steven May | 3,742 | 18.9 | −1.2 |
| United Australia | Mike Manefield | 1,383 | 7.0 | +7.0 |
| Total formal votes | | 19,811 | 96.3 | −1.1 |
| Informal votes | | 751 | 3.7 | +1.1 |
| Turnout | | 20,562 | 93.5 | |
Two-party-preferred result
| Liberal | Ivan Venning | 12,854 | 64.9 | −7.6 |
| Labor | Steven May | 6,957 | 35.1 | +7.6 |
Two-candidate-preferred result
| Liberal | Ivan Venning | 11,630 | 58.7 | −13.8 |
| Democrats | Pam Kelly | 8,181 | 41.3 | +41.3 |
| Liberal hold | | Swing | N/A | |

=== Spence ===
1997 South Australian state election: Spence
| Party | Candidate | Votes | % | ±% |
|---|---|---|---|---|
| Labor | Michael Atkinson | 11,806 | 64.8 | +14.8 |
| Liberal | Alex Smith | 4,063 | 22.3 | −16.5 |
| Democrats | Danny Grimsey | 2,339 | 12.8 | +5.1 |
| Total formal votes | | 18,208 | 96.0 | −0.1 |
| Informal votes | | 768 | 4.0 | +0.1 |
| Turnout | | 18,976 | 90.9 | |
Two-party-preferred result
| Labor | Michael Atkinson | 13,340 | 73.3 | +15.6 |
| Liberal | Alex Smith | 4,868 | 26.7 | −15.6 |
| Labor hold | | Swing | +15.6 | |

=== Stuart ===
1997 South Australian state election: Stuart
| Party | Candidate | Votes | % | ±% |
|---|---|---|---|---|
| Liberal | Graham Gunn | 8,203 | 44.0 | −4.6 |
| Labor | Ben Browne | 7,039 | 37.8 | +3.6 |
| Democrats | Nick Weetman | 2,264 | 12.1 | +7.9 |
| Independent | Vince Coulthard | 1,135 | 6.1 | +6.1 |
| Total formal votes | | 18,641 | 96.9 | −0.9 |
| Informal votes | | 592 | 3.1 | +0.9 |
| Turnout | | 19,233 | 91.2 | |
Two-party-preferred result
| Liberal | Graham Gunn | 9,602 | 51.5 | −7.5 |
| Labor | Ben Browne | 9,039 | 48.5 | +7.5 |
| Liberal hold | | Swing | −7.5 | |

=== Taylor ===
1997 South Australian state election: Taylor
| Party | Candidate | Votes | % | ±% |
|---|---|---|---|---|
| Labor | Trish White | 10,657 | 58.7 | +7.6 |
| Liberal | Matt Dyki | 3,840 | 21.2 | −13.1 |
| Democrats | Helen Munro | 2,952 | 16.3 | +5.2 |
| National Action | Lynette Schultz | 697 | 3.8 | +3.8 |
| Total formal votes | | 18,146 | 95.1 | −0.9 |
| Informal votes | | 940 | 4.9 | +0.9 |
| Turnout | | 19,086 | 92.2 | |
Two-party-preferred result
| Labor | Trish White | 13,101 | 72.2 | +12.7 |
| Liberal | Matt Dyki | 5,045 | 27.8 | −12.7 |
| Labor hold | | Swing | +12.7 | |

=== Torrens ===
1997 South Australian state election: Torrens
| Party | Candidate | Votes | % | ±% |
|---|---|---|---|---|
| Labor | Robyn Geraghty | 9,096 | 48.0 | +12.5 |
| Liberal | Geoff Harris | 6,226 | 32.9 | −15.5 |
| Democrats | Tony Hill | 2,895 | 15.3 | +5.6 |
| United Australia | Ronald Lupp | 731 | 3.9 | +3.9 |
| Total formal votes | | 18,948 | 96.0 | +0.1 |
| Informal votes | | 796 | 4.0 | −0.1 |
| Turnout | | 19,744 | 92.6 | |
Two-party-preferred result
| Labor | Robyn Geraghty | 11,380 | 60.1 | +16.6 |
| Liberal | Geoff Harris | 7,568 | 39.9 | −16.6 |
| Labor gain from Liberal | | Swing | +16.6 | |

=== Unley ===
1997 South Australian state election: Unley
| Party | Candidate | Votes | % | ±% |
|---|---|---|---|---|
| Liberal | Mark Brindal | 7,873 | 41.5 | −15.2 |
| Labor | Ann Drohan | 5,095 | 26.8 | −3.7 |
| Independent | Michael Keenan | 3,227 | 17.0 | +17.0 |
| Democrats | Maude Thompson | 2,549 | 13.4 | +3.5 |
| United Australia | Tony Parmiter | 234 | 1.2 | +1.2 |
| Total formal votes | | 18,978 | 96.6 | −0.7 |
| Informal votes | | 660 | 3.4 | +0.7 |
| Turnout | | 19,638 | 88.3 | |
Two-party-preferred result
| Liberal | Mark Brindal | 10,337 | 54.5 | −7.0 |
| Labor | Ann Drohan | 8,641 | 45.5 | +7.0 |
| Liberal hold | | Swing | −7.0 | |

=== Waite ===
1997 South Australian state election: Waite
| Party | Candidate | Votes | % | ±% |
|---|---|---|---|---|
| Liberal | Martin Hamilton-Smith | 9,899 | 52.4 | −11.1 |
| Democrats | Don Gilbert | 4,592 | 24.3 | +6.2 |
| Labor | Sara Cochrane | 4,394 | 23.3 | +7.6 |
| Total formal votes | | 18,885 | 96.6 | −0.5 |
| Informal votes | | 658 | 3.4 | +0.5 |
| Turnout | | 19,543 | 90.5 | |
Two-party-preferred result
| Liberal | Martin Hamilton-Smith | 11,751 | 62.2 | −12.1 |
| Labor | Sara Cochrane | 7,134 | 37.8 | +12.1 |
Two-candidate-preferred result
| Liberal | Martin Hamilton-Smith | 10,550 | 55.9 | −17.4 |
| Democrats | Don Gilbert | 8,335 | 44.1 | +17.4 |
| Liberal hold | | Swing | −17.4 | |

=== Wright ===
1997 South Australian state election: Wright
| Party | Candidate | Votes | % | ±% |
|---|---|---|---|---|
| Labor | Jennifer Rankine | 8,076 | 41.4 | +1.0 |
| Liberal | Scott Ashenden | 7,175 | 36.8 | −11.9 |
| Democrats | Christine Posta | 2,604 | 13.4 | +5.3 |
| Independent | John Siemers | 826 | 4.2 | +4.2 |
| Independent | Gregg McDonald | 524 | 2.7 | +2.7 |
| United Australia | Olive Weston | 299 | 1.5 | +1.5 |
| Total formal votes | | 19,504 | 95.4 | −1.9 |
| Informal votes | | 933 | 4.6 | +1.9 |
| Turnout | | 20,437 | 92.6 | |
Two-party-preferred result
| Labor | Jennifer Rankine | 10,354 | 53.1 | +6.4 |
| Liberal | Scott Ashenden | 9,150 | 46.9 | −6.4 |
| Labor gain from Liberal | | Swing | +6.4 | |

== See also ==
- Candidates of the 1997 South Australian state election
- Members of the South Australian House of Assembly, 1997–2002
