= Electoral results for the district of Lee =

South Australian district election results

This is a list of electoral results for the Electoral district of Lee in South Australian state elections.

== Members for Lee ==
| Member | Party | Term |
|---|---|---|
| Joe Rossi | Liberal Party | 1993–1997 |
| Michael Wright | Labor Party | 1997–2014 |
| Stephen Mullighan | Labor Party | 2014–2026 |

== Election results ==
=== Elections in the 2020s ===
==== 2026 ====
2026 South Australian state election: Lee
| Party | Candidate | Votes | % | ±% |
|---|---|---|---|---|
| Labor | David Wilkins | 10,072 | 44.7 | −6.6 |
| One Nation | Fabio Sturm | 5,844 | 25.4 | +25.4 |
| Liberal | Merlindie Fardone | 3,685 | 16.0 | −18.1 |
| Greens | Brett Ferris | 2,302 | 10.0 | +1.6 |
| Family First | Krystal Schulz | 482 | 2.1 | −4.2 |
| Real Change | Vasko Vukoje | 269 | 1.2 | +1.2 |
| Fair Go | Sarah McGrath | 214 | 0.9 | +0.9 |
| Australian Family | Bill Day | 154 | 0.7 | +0.7 |
| Total formal votes | | 23,022 | 95.3 | −1.7 |
| Informal votes | | 1,124 | 4.7 | +1.7 |
| Turnout | | 24,146 | 89.1 | +0.6 |
Two-candidate-preferred result
| Labor | David Wilkins | 13,666 | 59.4 | −1.8 |
| One Nation | Fabio Sturm | 9,356 | 40.6 | +40.6 |
| Labor hold | | | | |

==== 2022 ====
2022 South Australian state election: Lee
| Party | Candidate | Votes | % | ±% |
|---|---|---|---|---|
| Labor | Stephen Mullighan | 11,371 | 51.3 | +7.5 |
| Liberal | Jake Hall-Evans | 7,556 | 34.1 | +0.6 |
| Greens | Andrew Payne | 1,854 | 8.4 | +4.0 |
| Family First | John Moldovan | 1,403 | 6.3 | +6.3 |
| Total formal votes | | 22,184 | 97.0 | |
| Informal votes | | 693 | 3.0 | |
| Turnout | | 22,877 | 88.5 | |
Two-party-preferred result
| Labor | Stephen Mullighan | 13,577 | 61.2 | +5.9 |
| Liberal | Jake Hall-Evans | 8,607 | 38.8 | −5.9 |
| Labor hold | | Swing | +5.9 | |

Distribution of preferences: Lee
| Party | Candidate | Votes | Round 1 | | Round 2 | |
| Party | Candidate | Votes | Dist. | Total | Dist. | Total |
|---|---|---|---|---|---|---|
| Quota (50% + 1) | | 11,093 | | | | |
| Labor | Stephen Mullighan | 11,371 | +415 | 11,786 | +1,791 | 13,577 |
| Liberal | Jake Hall-Evans | 7,556 | +555 | 8,111 | +496 | 8,607 |
| Greens | Andrew Payne | 1,854 | +433 | 2,287 | Excluded | |
| Family First | John Moldovan | 1,403 | Excluded | | | |

=== Elections in the 2010s ===
==== 2018 ====
2018 South Australian state election: Lee
| Party | Candidate | Votes | % | ±% |
|---|---|---|---|---|
| Labor | Stephen Mullighan | 9,845 | 42.5 | +0.4 |
| Liberal | Steven Rypp | 8,203 | 35.4 | −5.5 |
| SA-Best | Andy Legrand | 2,953 | 12.7 | +12.7 |
| Greens | Patrick O'Sullivan | 1,023 | 4.4 | −1.6 |
| Conservatives | Vicki Jessop | 731 | 3.2 | −0.7 |
| Dignity | Tiffany Littler | 304 | 1.3 | +1.3 |
| Danig | Aristidis Kerpelis | 127 | 0.5 | +0.5 |
| Total formal votes | | 23,186 | 95.6 | −1.0 |
| Informal votes | | 1,065 | 4.4 | +1.0 |
| Turnout | | 24,251 | 91.5 | +2.1 |
Two-party-preferred result
| Labor | Stephen Mullighan | 12,485 | 53.8 | +2.3 |
| Liberal | Steven Rypp | 10,701 | 46.2 | −2.3 |
| Labor hold | | Swing | +2.3 | |

2014 South Australian state election: Lee
| Party | Candidate | Votes | % | ±% |
|---|---|---|---|---|
| Labor | Stephen Mullighan | 9,418 | 41.0 | −5.8 |
| Liberal | Liz Davies | 8,216 | 35.7 | +1.5 |
| Independent | Gary Johanson | 2,581 | 11.2 | +11.2 |
| Greens | Jo Seater | 1,794 | 7.8 | −0.2 |
| Family First | Denis Power | 686 | 3.0 | −0.7 |
| Independent | Melita Calone | 301 | 1.3 | +1.3 |
| Total formal votes | | 22,996 | 96.4 | +1.1 |
| Informal votes | | 861 | 3.6 | −1.1 |
| Turnout | | 23,857 | 91.9 | −1.4 |
Two-party-preferred result
| Labor | Stephen Mullighan | 12,530 | 54.5 | −3.2 |
| Liberal | Liz Davies | 10,466 | 45.5 | +3.2 |
| Labor hold | | Swing | −3.2 | |

2010 South Australian state election: Lee
| Party | Candidate | Votes | % | ±% |
|---|---|---|---|---|
| Labor | Michael Wright | 9,734 | 46.3 | −12.4 |
| Liberal | Sue Gow | 7,263 | 34.5 | +9.0 |
| Greens | Yesha Joshi | 1,716 | 8.2 | +0.2 |
| Family First | Richard Bunting | 767 | 3.6 | −0.8 |
| Independent | Bob Briton | 608 | 2.9 | +2.9 |
| Independent | Colin Thomas | 492 | 2.3 | +2.3 |
| Independent | Joe Rossi | 455 | 2.2 | +2.2 |
| Total formal votes | | 21,035 | 95.3 | |
| Informal votes | | 976 | 4.7 | |
| Turnout | | 22,011 | 93.0 | |
Two-party-preferred result
| Labor | Michael Wright | 12,008 | 57.1 | −12.7 |
| Liberal | Sue Gow | 9,027 | 42.9 | +12.7 |
| Labor hold | | Swing | −12.7 | |

=== Elections in the 2000s ===
2006 South Australian state election: Lee
| Party | Candidate | Votes | % | ±% |
|---|---|---|---|---|
| Labor | Michael Wright | 11,785 | 58.6 | +10.8 |
| Liberal | Peter Rea | 5,269 | 26.2 | −8.3 |
| Greens | Meryl McDougall | 1,537 | 7.6 | +2.2 |
| Family First | Denis Power | 920 | 4.6 | +4.4 |
| Democrats | Trevor Tucker | 603 | 3.0 | −2.5 |
| Total formal votes | | 20,114 | 96.6 | |
| Informal votes | | 708 | 3.4 | |
| Turnout | | 20,822 | 93.0 | |
Two-party-preferred result
| Labor | Michael Wright | 13,938 | 69.3 | +9.8 |
| Liberal | Peter Rea | 6,176 | 30.7 | −9.8 |
| Labor hold | | Swing | +9.8 | |

2002 South Australian state election: Lee
| Party | Candidate | Votes | % | ±% |
|---|---|---|---|---|
| Labor | Michael Wright | 9,131 | 45.8 | −0.2 |
| Liberal | Scott Cadzow | 7,405 | 37.2 | +5.0 |
| Democrats | Trevor Tucker | 1,104 | 5.5 | −7.9 |
| Greens | Pat Netschitowsky | 1,062 | 5.3 | +5.3 |
| SA First | Cale Dalton | 549 | 2.8 | +2.8 |
| One Nation | Lee Peacock | 454 | 2.3 | +2.3 |
| Independent | Alan Griffiths | 225 | 1.1 | +1.1 |
| Total formal votes | | 19,930 | 96.7 | |
| Informal votes | | 682 | 3.3 | |
| Turnout | | 20,612 | 93.4 | |
Two-party-preferred result
| Labor | Michael Wright | 11,361 | 57.0 | −0.6 |
| Liberal | Scott Cadzow | 8,569 | 43.0 | +0.6 |
| Labor hold | | Swing | −0.6 | |

=== Elections in the 1990s ===
1997 South Australian state election: Lee
| Party | Candidate | Votes | % | ±% |
|---|---|---|---|---|
| Labor | Michael Wright | 8,545 | 45.7 | +3.5 |
| Liberal | Joe Rossi | 5,977 | 32.0 | −15.3 |
| Democrats | Peter Clements | 2,194 | 11.7 | +7.1 |
| Independent | Carlo Meschino | 905 | 4.8 | +4.8 |
| Independent | Lorraine O'Connor | 560 | 3.0 | +3.0 |
| Independent | Bernhard Cotton | 290 | 1.6 | +0.4 |
| United Australia | Frank Fonovic | 218 | 1.2 | +1.2 |
| Total formal votes | | 18,689 | 94.1 | −0.9 |
| Informal votes | | 1,176 | 5.9 | +0.9 |
| Turnout | | 19,865 | 91.9 | |
Two-party-preferred result
| Labor | Michael Wright | 10,666 | 57.1 | +8.1 |
| Liberal | Joe Rossi | 8,023 | 42.9 | −8.1 |
| Labor gain from Liberal | | Swing | +8.1 | |

1993 South Australian state election: Lee
| Party | Candidate | Votes | % | ±% |
|---|---|---|---|---|
| Liberal | Joe Rossi | 9,138 | 47.3 | +8.9 |
| Labor | Kevin Hamilton | 8,129 | 42.1 | −11.7 |
| Democrats | Peter Clements | 890 | 4.6 | −3.1 |
| Independent | Barbara Wasylenko | 547 | 2.8 | +2.8 |
| Natural Law | Lynne Brown | 239 | 1.2 | +1.2 |
| Independent | Bernhard Cotton | 223 | 1.2 | +1.2 |
| Call to Australia | Alan Behn | 137 | 0.7 | +0.7 |
| Total formal votes | | 19,303 | 95.0 | −2.3 |
| Informal votes | | 1,025 | 5.0 | +2.3 |
| Turnout | | 20,328 | 94.1 | |
Two-party-preferred result
| Liberal | Joe Rossi | 9,864 | 51.1 | +9.2 |
| Labor | Kevin Hamilton | 9,439 | 48.9 | −9.2 |
| Liberal gain from Labor | | Swing | +9.2 | |
