= Electoral results for the district of MacKillop =

South Australian district election results

This is a list of electoral results for the Electoral district of MacKillop in South Australian state elections.

== Members for MacKillop ==
Member	Party	Term
Dale Baker	Liberal	1993–1997
Mitch Williams	Independent	1997–1999
Mitch Williams	Liberal	1999–2018
Nick McBride	Liberal	2018–2026

== Election results ==
=== Elections in the 2020s ===
==== 2026 ====
2026 South Australian state election: MacKillop
Party	Candidate	Votes	%	±%
One Nation	Jason Virgo	8,407	35.3	+27.2
Liberal	Rebekah Rosser	5,623	23.6	−38.7
Labor	Mark Braes	3,715	15.6	−4.5
Independent	Nick McBride	3,398	14.2	+14.2
Greens	Cathy Olsson	862	3.6	+3.6
National	Jonathan Pietzsch	780	3.3	−1.5
Legalise Cannabis	Tim Green	528	2.2	+2.2
Australian Family	Joanna Day	350	1.5	+1.5
Independent	Steven Davies	180	0.7	+0.7
Total formal votes		23,843	95.0	−1.5
Informal votes		1,267	5.0	+1.5
Turnout		25,110	90.0	−0.6
Two-candidate-preferred result
One Nation	Jason Virgo	12,123	50.8	+50.8
Liberal	Rebekah Rosser	11,720	49.2	−23.4
One Nation gain from Liberal				

==== 2022 ====
2022 South Australian state election: MacKillop
Party	Candidate	Votes	%	±%
Liberal	Nick McBride	14,623	62.3	+6.8
Labor	Mark Braes	4,703	20.0	+10.0
One Nation	Pam Giehr	1,892	8.1	+8.1
Family First	Dayle Baker	1,139	4.9	+4.9
National	Jonathan Pietzsch	1,109	4.7	+4.7
Total formal votes		23,466	96.5	
Informal votes		851	3.5	
Turnout		24,317	89.4	
Two-party-preferred result
Liberal	Nick McBride	17,048	72.6	−2.6
Labor	Mark Braes	6,418	27.4	+2.6
Liberal hold		Swing	−2.6	

Distribution of preferences: MacKillop
Party	Candidate	Votes	Round 1		Round 2		Round 3	
Party	Candidate	Votes	Dist.	Total	Dist.	Total	Dist.	Total
Quota (50% + 1)		11,734						
Liberal	Nick McBride	14,623	+457	15,080	+519	15,599	+1,449	17,048
Labor	Mark Braes	4,703	+102	4,805	+416	5,221	+1,197	6,418
One Nation	Pam Giehr	1,892	+189	2,081	+565	2,646	Excluded	
Family First	Dayle Baker	1,139	+361	1,500	Excluded			
National	Jonathan Pietzsch	1,109	Excluded					

=== Elections in the 2010s ===
==== 2018 ====
2018 South Australian state election: MacKillop
Party	Candidate	Votes	%	±%
Liberal	Nick McBride	11,346	54.8	−10.2
SA-Best	Tracy Hill	3,902	18.8	+18.8
Labor	Hilary Wigg	2,022	9.8	−4.9
Conservatives	Richard Bateman	1,799	8.7	+1.1
Independent	Jon Ey	1,142	5.5	+5.5
Greens	Donella Peters	492	2.4	−3.3
Total formal votes		20,703	95.9	−1.2
Informal votes		882	4.1	+1.2
Turnout		21,585	92.4	−0.9
Two-party-preferred result
Liberal	Nick McBride	15,519	75.0	−1.7
Labor	Hilary Wigg	5,184	25.0	+1.7
Two-candidate-preferred result
Liberal	Nick McBride	13,995	67.6	−9.1
SA-Best	Tracy Hill	6,708	32.4	+32.4
Liberal hold				

2014 South Australian state election: MacKillop
Party	Candidate	Votes	%	±%
Liberal	Mitch Williams	13,803	65.1	+5.0
Labor	Terry Soulmatis	3,099	14.6	+2.1
Family First	Bill Pomery	1,602	7.5	+1.7
Independent	Steve Davies	1,503	7.1	+7.1
Greens	Donella Peters	1,212	5.7	+2.3
Total formal votes		21,219	97.1	−0.2
Informal votes		638	2.9	+0.2
Turnout		21,857	92.8	−0.2
Two-party-preferred result
Liberal	Mitch Williams	16,280	76.7	+2.0
Labor	Terry Soulmatis	4,939	23.3	−2.0
Liberal hold		Swing	N/A	

2010 South Australian state election: MacKillop
Party	Candidate	Votes	%	±%
Liberal	Mitch Williams	12,267	60.9	+0.9
Independent	Darren O'Halloran	3,463	17.2	+17.2
Labor	Simone McDonnell	2,497	12.4	−8.8
Family First	Jenene Childs	1,199	6.0	−1.0
Greens	Andrew Jennings	718	3.6	−0.6
Total formal votes		20,144	97.2	
Informal votes		572	2.8	
Turnout		20,716	93.0	
Two-party-preferred result
Liberal	Mitch Williams	15,161	75.3	+3.6
Labor	Simone McDonnell	4,983	24.7	−3.6
Two-candidate-preferred result
Liberal	Mitch Williams	14,112	70.1	−2.1
Independent	Darren O'Halloran	6,032	29.9	+29.9
Liberal hold		Swing	N/A	

=== Elections in the 2000s ===
2006 South Australian state election: MacKillop
Party	Candidate	Votes	%	±%
Liberal	Mitch Williams	12,085	59.9	+7.8
Labor	Phil Golding	4,277	21.2	+7.7
Family First	Philip Cornish	1,402	7.0	+7.0
National	Darren O'Halloran	1,060	5.3	+0.6
Greens	Diane Atkinson	838	4.2	+4.2
Democrats	Bob Netherton	497	2.5	+0.5
Total formal votes		20,159	97.0	
Informal votes		623	3.0	
Turnout		20,782	83.1	
Two-party-preferred result
Liberal	Mitch Williams	14,553	72.2	+1.9
Labor	Phil Golding	5,606	27.8	−1.9
Liberal hold		Swing	+1.9	

2002 South Australian state election: MacKillop
Party	Candidate	Votes	%	±%
Liberal	Mitch Williams	10,809	52.1	+16.6
Independent	Bill Hender	3,470	16.7	+16.7
Labor	Philip Golding	2,798	13.5	−1.9
Independent	Bill Murray	1,727	8.3	+8.3
National	Darren O'Halloran	975	4.7	−3.8
One Nation	Arthur Tebbutt	559	2.7	+2.7
Democrats	Bob Netherton	409	2.0	−3.0
Total formal votes		20,747	97.5	
Informal votes		542	2.5	
Turnout		21,289	94.4	
Two-party-preferred result
Liberal	Mitch Williams		70.3	−0.6
Labor	Philip Golding		29.7	+0.6
Two-candidate-preferred result
Liberal	Mitch Williams	12,740	61.4	−9.5
Independent	Bill Hender	8,007	38.6	+38.6
Liberal hold		Swing	N/A	

=== Elections in the 1990s ===
1997 South Australian state election: MacKillop
Party	Candidate	Votes	%	±%
Liberal	Dale Baker	7,170	35.5	−35.7
Independent	Mitch Williams	5,830	28.9	+28.9
Labor	Kiley Rogers	3,116	15.4	−1.4
National	Anne Hayes	1,708	8.5	+8.5
Democrats	Gen Netherton	1,008	5.0	−1.5
United Australia	Don McInnes	767	3.8	+3.8
Call to Australia	Philip Cornish	577	2.9	−2.6
Total formal votes		20,176	96.6	−1.7
Informal votes		701	3.4	+1.7
Turnout		20,877	92.6	
Two-party-preferred result
Liberal	Dale Baker	14,300	70.9	−8.5
Labor	Kiley Rogers	5,876	29.1	+8.5
Two-candidate-preferred result
Independent	Mitch Williams	11,679	57.9	+57.9
Liberal	Dale Baker	8,497	42.1	−37.3
Independent gain from Liberal		Swing	N/A	

1993 South Australian state election: MacKillop
Party	Candidate	Votes	%	±%
Liberal	Dale Baker	14,133	69.0	0.0
Labor	Gerard McEwen	3,745	18.3	−4.8
Democrats	Angela Smith	1,382	6.8	−0.8
Call to Australia	Philip Cornish	1,211	5.9	+5.9
Total formal votes		20,471	98.2	0.0
Informal votes		369	1.8	0.0
Turnout		20,840	95.2	
Two-party-preferred result
Liberal	Dale Baker	15,903	77.7	+4.0
Labor	Gerard McEwen	4,568	22.3	−4.0
Liberal hold		Swing	+4.0	

=== Elections in the 1980s ===
1989 South Australian state election: Victoria
Party	Candidate	Votes	%	±%
Liberal	Dale Baker	12,892	68.9	+19.5
Labor	Ray Tunks	4,401	23.5	−3.6
Democrats	Johannes Cullen	1,420	7.6	+4.8
Total formal votes		18,713	98.2	+1.7
Informal votes		348	1.8	−1.7
Turnout		19,061	94.7	+0.2
Two-party-preferred result
Liberal	Dale Baker	13,706	73.2	+4.9
Labor	Ray Tunks	5,007	26.8	−4.9
Liberal hold		Swing	+4.9	

1985 South Australian state election: Victoria
Party	Candidate	Votes	%	±%
Liberal	Dale Baker	9,074	49.4	−10.6
Labor	Bill Hender	4,972	27.1	−1.9
National	Geoff Clothier	3,797	20.7	+12.7
Democrats	Roy Milne	518	2.8	+0.2
Total formal votes		18,361	96.5	
Informal votes		662	3.5	
Turnout		19,023	94.5	
Two-party-preferred result
Liberal	Dale Baker	12,549	68.3	+0.3
Labor	Bill Hender	5,812	31.7	−0.3
Liberal hold		Swing	+0.3	

1982 South Australian state election: Victoria
Party	Candidate	Votes	%	±%
Liberal	Allan Rodda	8,023	55.7	−12.3
Labor	Simon Bryant	4,427	30.7	−1.3
National	Geoffrey Clothier	1,559	10.8	+10.8
Democrats	Peter Butcher	398	2.8	+2.8
Total formal votes		14,407	95.5	−0.4
Informal votes		673	4.5	+0.4
Turnout		15,080	94.3	+1.0
Two-party-preferred result
Liberal	Allan Rodda	9,592	66.6	−1.4
Labor	Simon Bryant	4,815	33.4	+1.4
Liberal hold		Swing	−1.4	

=== Elections in the 1970s ===
1979 South Australian state election: Victoria
Party	Candidate	Votes	%	±%
Liberal	Allan Rodda	9,476	68.0	+2.7
Labor	Terance Roberts	4,451	32.0	−2.7
Total formal votes		13,927	95.9	−2.0
Informal votes		596	4.1	+2.0
Turnout		14,523	93.3	−0.5
Liberal hold		Swing	+2.7	

1977 South Australian state election: Victoria
Party	Candidate	Votes	%	±%
Liberal	Allan Rodda	9,285	65.3	+12.9
Labor	Graeme Richardson	4,923	34.7	+8.4
Total formal votes		14,208	97.9	
Informal votes		306	2.1	
Turnout		14,514	93.8	
Liberal hold		Swing	−5.1	

1975 South Australian state election: Victoria
Party	Candidate	Votes	%	±%
Liberal	Allan Rodda	6,500	64.1	0.0
Labor	Jean Hillier	1,698	16.7	+16.7
National	Graham Carrick	1,145	11.3	−24.6
Liberal Movement	Colin Hall	796	7.9	+7.9
Total formal votes		10,139	97.6	+3.8
Informal votes		251	2.4	−3.8
Turnout		10,390	93.7	−1.0
Two-party-preferred result
Liberal	Allan Rodda	8,055	79.4	+15.3
Labor	Jean Hillier	2,084	20.6	+20.6
Liberal hold		Swing	N/A	

1973 South Australian state election: Victoria
Party	Candidate	Votes	%	±%
Liberal and Country	Allan Rodda	5,768	64.1	+5.7
National	Graham Carrick	3,232	35.9	+20.7
Total formal votes		9,000	93.8	−4.9
Informal votes		598	6.2	+4.9
Turnout		9,598	94.7	−0.9
Liberal and Country hold		Swing	N/A	

1970 South Australian state election: Victoria
Party	Candidate	Votes	%	±%
Liberal and Country	Allan Rodda	5,383	58.4	
Labor	Eileen Bennett	2,435	26.4	
National	Leonard Roberts	1,406	15.2	
Total formal votes		9,224	98.7	
Informal votes		121	1.3	
Turnout		9,345	95.6	
Two-party-preferred result
Liberal and Country	Allan Rodda	6,648	72.1	
Labor	Eileen Bennett	2,576	27.9	
Liberal and Country hold		Swing		

=== Elections in the 1960s ===
1968 South Australian state election: Victoria
Party	Candidate	Votes	%	±%
Liberal and Country	Allan Rodda	4,439	62.3	+11.2
Labor	Reginald Jordan	1,942	28.1	−11.4
Independent	Alfred Donnelly	527	7.6	+7.6
Total formal votes		6,908	97.9	−1.2
Informal votes		149	2.1	+1.2
Turnout		7,057	95.6	+0.4
Two-party-preferred result
Liberal and Country	Allan Rodda	4,703	68.1	+9.8
Labor	Reginald Jordan	2,205	31.9	−9.8
Liberal and Country hold		Swing	+9.8	

1965 South Australian state election: Victoria
Party	Candidate	Votes	%	±%
Liberal and Country	Allan Rodda	3,511	51.1	−2.6
Labor	David Walker	2,713	39.5	−6.8
National	James McLachlan	421	6.1	+6.1
Independent	John Gartner	221	3.2	+3.2
Total formal votes		6,866	99.1	+0.1
Informal votes		59	0.9	−0.1
Turnout		6,925	95.2	+0.1
Two-party-preferred result
Liberal and Country	Allan Rodda	4,001	58.3	+4.6
Labor	David Walker	2,865	41.7	−4.6
Liberal and Country hold		Swing	+4.6	

1962 South Australian state election: Victoria
Party	Candidate	Votes	%	±%
Liberal and Country	Leslie Harding	3,651	53.7	−3.0
Labor	Alfred Donnelly	3,147	46.3	+8.5
Total formal votes		6,798	99.0	0.0
Informal votes		67	1.0	0.0
Turnout		6,865	95.1	−0.1
Liberal and Country hold		Swing	−7.7	
