= Candidates of the 1997 South Australian state election =

The 1997 South Australian state election was held on 11 October 1997.

== Retiring Members ==
=== Labor ===
- Frank Blevins MHA (Giles)
- John Quirke MHA (Playford)
- Anne Levy MLC

=== Liberal ===
- Harold Allison MHA (Gordon)
- Stephen Baker MHA (Waite)
- Heini Becker MHA (Peake)
- Peter Dunn MLC

== House of Assembly ==
Sitting members are shown in bold text. Successful candidates are highlighted in the relevant colour. Where there is possible confusion, an asterisk (*) is also used.

Electorate	Held by	Labor candidate	Liberal candidate	Democrats candidate	Other candidates
Adelaide	Liberal	Kate Callaghan	**Michael Armitage**	Sue Meeuwissen	Mark Moran (Grn)
Bragg	Liberal	Anthony Schultz	**Graham Ingerson**	Jackie Dearing	
Bright	Liberal	Kathy Williams	**Wayne Matthew**	Fiona Blinco	
Chaffey	Liberal	Michael Subacius	**Kent Andrew**	Karrie Lannstrom	Karlene Maywald (Nat)
Coles	Liberal	Susan Dawe	**Joan Hall**	Jonathan Grear	Maria Lynch (Ind)
Colton	Liberal	Joe Cappella	**Steve Condous**	Anna Tree	Bob Randall (Ind)
Davenport	Liberal	Jillian Bradbury	**Iain Evans**	Gordon Russell	Jack King (Ind); Bob Marshall (Ind Lib); Annie Seaman (Ind)
Elder	Liberal	Patrick Conlon	**David Wade**	Chris Kennedy	George Apap (Ind); Bruce Hull (Ind); Robert Low (UAP); Jo Stokes (Ind)
Elizabeth	Labor	**Lea Stevens**	Angus Bristow	Michael Pilling	
Finniss	Liberal	David Detchon	**Dean Brown**	John Lavers	
Fisher	Liberal	Tania Farrell	**Bob Such**	Debbie Jones	
Flinders	Liberal	Manuel Chrisan	**Liz Penfold**	Kime Pedler	Peter Blacker (Nat); John Kroezen (UAP)
Florey	Liberal	Frances Bedford	**Sam Bass**	Steve Bartholomew	Stan Batten (UAP); Snowy Burns (Ind); Michael Wohltmann (Ind)
Frome	Liberal	Colin McGavisk	**Rob Kerin**	Marcus Reseigh	Ian Grey (UAP)
Giles	Labor	Lyn Breuer	Terry Stephens	Clint Garrett	Terry Sotos (UAP)
Gordon	Liberal	Andrew Godfrey	Scott Dixon	Simon Mill	Rory McEwen* (Ind); Bronte Whelan (Ind)
Goyder	Liberal	Chris Snewin	**John Meier**	Colleen Kenny	Andrew Runeckles (Nat)
Hammond	Liberal	Michael Young	**Peter Lewis**	Brian Haddy	Keith Steinborner (UAP)
Hanson	Liberal	Stephanie Key	**Stewart Leggett**	Pat Macaskill	Mark Eckermann (Ind); Dean Le Poidevin (Ind); John Trainer (Ind Lab); Aleksander Wacyk (UAP)
Hart	Labor	**Kevin Foley**	Adam Kealley	Robert Fisher	
Hartley	Liberal	Quentin Black	**Joe Scalzi**	Ian Richards	
Heysen	Liberal	Tom Kenyon	**David Wotton**	Susan Scrymgour	
Kaurna	Liberal	John Hill	**Lorraine Rosenberg**	Dennis Dorney	Barbara Fraser (Ind); Mick Kreig (Ind); Malcolm Shaw (UAP)
Kavel	Liberal	Robert Kieselbach	**John Olsen**	Cathi Tucker-Lee	Evan Troussé (UAP)
Lee	Liberal	Michael Wright	**Joe Rossi**	Peter Clements	Bernhard Cotton (Ind); Frank Fonovic (UAP); Carlo Meschino (Ind); Lorraine O'Connor (Ind)
Light	Liberal	Pauline Gill	**Malcolm Buckby**	Kate Reynolds	
MacKillop	Liberal	Kiley Rogers	**Dale Baker**	Gen Netherton	Philip Cornish (CTA); Anne Hayes (Nat); Don McInnes (UAP); Mitch Williams* (Ind Lib)
Mawson	Liberal	John McInnes	**Robert Brokenshire**	Graham Pratt	
Mitchell	Liberal	Kris Hanna	**Colin Caudell**	Lawrence Wapnah	Daniel Elsley (Ind)
Morphett	Liberal	Stephen Graney	**John Oswald**	Danny Carroll	
Napier	Labor	**Annette Hurley**	Rena Zurawel	Don Knott	
Newland	Liberal	Michael Regan	**Dorothy Kotz**	Louise Armstrong-Quincey	
Norwood	Liberal	Vini Ciccarello	**John Cummins**	Keith Oehme	Michelle Drummond (Grn); Kevin Duffy (UAP)
Peake	Liberal	Tom Koutsantonis	Graham Parry	Sharon Robertson	
Playford	Labor	Jack Snelling	Peter Panagaris	Mal Cummings	Bexley Carman (UAP)
Price	Labor	**Murray De Laine**	Amber Del Pin	Phillip Thomas	
Ramsay	Labor	**Mike Rann**	Phil Newton	Matilda Bawden	Tony Michalski (NA); Wayne Schultz (UAP)
Reynell	Liberal	Gay Thompson	**Julie Greig**	Greg Thomas	Cathy Crago (Ind); Dan Moriarty (Ind)
Ross Smith	Labor	**Ralph Clarke**	Danny McGuire	John Woods	David Shelly (UAP)
Schubert	Liberal	Steven May	**Ivan Venning**	Pam Kelly	Mike Manefield (UAP)
Spence	Labor	**Michael Atkinson**	Alex Smith	Danny Grimsey	
Stuart	Liberal	Ben Browne	**Graham Gunn**	Nick Weetman	Vince Coulthard (Ind)
Taylor	Labor	**Trish White**	Matt Dyki	Helen Munro	Lynette Schultz (NA)
Torrens	Labor	**Robyn Geraghty**	Geoff Harris	Tony Hill	Ronald Lupp (UAP)
Unley	Liberal	Ann Drohan	**Mark Brindal**	Maude Thompson	Michael Keenan (Ind); Tony Parmiter (UAP)
Waite	Liberal	Sara Cochrane	Martin Hamilton-Smith	Don Gilbert	
Wright	Liberal	Jennifer Rankine	**Scott Ashenden**	Christine Posta	Gregg McDonald (Ind); John Siemers (Ind); Olive Weston (UAP)

== Legislative Council ==
Sitting members are shown in bold text. Tickets that elected at least one MLC are highlighted in the relevant colour. Successful candidates are identified by an asterisk (*). Eleven seats were up for election. Labor were defending five seats. The Liberals were defending five seats. The Democrats were defending one seat.

Labor candidates	Liberal candidates	Democrats candidates	Nationals SA candidates	Greens candidates	Independent candidates No Pokies Campaign
1. **Ron Roberts***; 2. **George Weatherill***; 3. **Terry Cameron***; 4. Carmel Zollo*; 5. **Paolo Nocella**; 6. Cressida Wall	1. **Rob Lucas***; 2. **Diana Laidlaw***; 3. **Julian Stefani***; 4. John Dawkins*; 5. **Bernice Pfitzner**; 6. John Voumard; 7. Diana Harvey; 8. Sophia Provatidis	1. **Mike Elliott***; 2. Ian Gilfillan*; 3. Matthew Mitchell; 4. Natalija Apponyi; 5. Sue Mann	1. Terry Mullan; 2. Richard Jacka	1. Paul Petit; 2. Rita Helling	1. Nick Xenophon*; 2. Robert Moran; 3. Pat Dean; 4. Graham Craig
Natural Law candidates	Grey Power candidates	United Australia candidates	OTMDSA candidates	Smokers Rights candidates	Independent candidates Australia First
1. Lyndal Vincent; 2. Heather Lorenzon; 3. Pamela Chipperfield; 4. Douglas Luckman; 5. Sandra Dunning	1. Emily Gilbey-Riley; 2. John Darbishire	1. Ellis Wayland; 2. Michael Hudson; 3. Jeanine Baker	1. Jenni Dobrowolski; 2. Neill Simpson	1. Brett McHolme; 2. Dennis Robinson	1. Bruce Preece; 2. Evonne Moore
Independent candidates Students Against HECS	Independent candidate HEMP Legalise Marijuana	Recreation and Fishing candidate	National Action candidate	Independent candidate for Voluntary Euthanasia	Independent candidate Representing the Silent Majority
1. Bradley Kitschke; 2. Kyam Maher	1. Jamnes Danenberg	1. Valda Harris	1. Michael Brander	1. Doug McLaren	1. Clive Mobbs
Independent candidates Against Cruelty Ban Duck Shooting					
1. Ralph Hahnheuser					
