= Results of the 1997 South Australian state election (Legislative Council) =

South Australian state election, 11 October 1997 Legislative Council << 1993–2002 >>
Enrolled voters	1,010,753				
Votes cast	937,026		Turnout	92.71	–0.91
Informal votes	40,523		Informal	4.32	+0.78
Summary of votes by party
Party	Primary votes	%	Swing	Seats won	Seats held
Liberal	339,064	37.82	–13.99	4	10
Labor	274,098	30.57	+3.17	4	8
Democrats	149,660	16.69	+8.65	2	3
No Pokies	25,630	2.86	+2.86	1	1
HEMP	15,432	1.72	–0.08	0	0
Greens	15,377	1.72	–0.02	0	0
Grey Power	14,261	1.59	–0.01	0	0
United Australia	11,920	1.33	+1.33	0	0
National	9,233	1.03	+0.31	0	0
Australia First	9,150	1.02	+1.02	0	0
Recreation and Fishing	7,048	0.79	+0.79	0	0
Overtaxed Motorists	6,024	0.67	+0.67	0	0
Other	19,606	2.18	*	0	0
Total	896,503			11	22

This is a list of results for the Legislative Council at the 1997 South Australian state election.

== Continuing members ==
The following MLCs were not up for re-election this year.

Member	Party	Term
Legh Davis	Liberal	1993–2002
Trevor Griffin	Liberal	1993–2002
Jamie Irwin	Liberal	1993–2002
Robert Lawson	Liberal	1993–2002
Angus Redford	Liberal	1993–2002
Caroline Schaefer	Liberal	1993–2002
Trevor Crothers	Labor	1993–2002
Paul Holloway	Labor	1993–2002
Carolyn Pickles	Labor	1993–2002
Terry Roberts	Labor	1993–2002
Sandra Kanck	Democrats	1993–2002

== Election results ==
1997 South Australian state election: Legislative Council
Party	Candidate	Votes	%	±%
Quota		74,709		
Liberal	1. Rob Lucas (elected 1); 2. Diana Laidlaw (elected 4); 3. Julian Stefani (elected 6); 4. John Dawkins (elected 8); 5. Bernice Pfitzner; 6. John Voumard; 7. Diana Harvey; 8. Sophia Provatidis	339,064	37.82	−13.99
Labor	1. Ron Roberts (elected 2); 2. George Weatherill (elected 5); 3. Terry Cameron (elected 7); 4. Carmel Zollo (elected 11); 5. Paolo Nocella; 6. Cressida Wall	274,098	30.57	+3.17
Democrats	1. Mike Elliott (elected 3); 2. Ian Gilfillan (elected 9); 3. Matthew Mitchell; 4. Natalija Apponyi; 5. Susan Mann	149,660	16.69	+8.65
No Pokies	1. Nick Xenophon (elected 10); 2. Robert Moran; 3. Pat Dean; 4. Graham Craig	25,630	2.86	+2.86
HEMP	Jamnes Danenberg	15,432	1.72	−0.08
Greens	1. Paul Petit; 2. Rita Helling	15,377	1.72	−0.02
Grey Power	1. Emily Gilbey-Riley; 2. John Darbishire	14,261	1.59	−0.01
United Australia	1. Ellis Wayland; 2. Michael Hudson; 3. Jeanine Baker	11,920	1.33	+1.33
National	1. Terry Mullan; 2. Richard Jacka	9,233	1.03	+0.31
Australia First	1. Bruce Preece; 2. Evonne Moore	9,150	1.02	+1.02
No Pokies	1. Nick Xenophon (elected 10); 2. Robert Moran; 3. Pat Dean; 4. Graham Craig	25,630	2.86	+2.86
Recreation and Fishing	Val Harris	7,048	0.79	+0.79
Overtaxed Motorists, Smokers, Drinkers	1. Jenni Dobrowolski; 2. Neill Simpson	6,024	0.67	+0.67
Independent for Voluntary Euthanasia	Doug McLaren	4,393	0.49	+0.49
National Action	Michael Brander	3,673	0.41	+0.41
Ban Duck Shooting	Ralph Hahnheuser	3,323	0.37	+0.37
Students against HECS	1. Bradley Kitschke; 2. Kyam Maher	2,957	0.33	+0.33
Smokers Rights	1. Brett McHolme; 2. Dennis Robinson	2,665	0.30	+0.30
Natural Law	1. Lyndal Vincent; 2. Heather Lorenzon; 3. Pamela Chipperfield; 4. Douglas Luckman; 5. Sandra Dunning	1,744	0.19	−0.19
Silent Majority	Clive Hobbs	851	0.09	−0.19
Total formal votes		896,503	95.68	−0.78
Informal votes		40,523	4.32	+0.78
Turnout		937,026	92.71	−0.91

== See also ==
- Candidates of the 1997 South Australian state election
- Members of the South Australian Legislative Council, 1997–2002
