= Members of the South Australian House of Assembly, 1997–2002 =

This is a list of members of the South Australian House of Assembly from 1997 to 2002, as elected at the 1997 state election:

Name	Party	Electorate	Term of office
Hon Dr Michael Armitage	Liberal	Adelaide	1989–2002
Hon Michael Atkinson	Labor	Spence	1989–2018
Frances Bedford	Labor	Florey	1997–2022
Lyn Breuer	Labor	Giles	1997–2014
Mark Brindal	Liberal	Unley	1989–2006
Robert Brokenshire	Liberal	Mawson	1993–2006
Hon Dean Brown	Liberal	Finniss	1973–1985, 1992–2006
Hon Malcolm Buckby	Liberal	Light	1993–2006
Vini Ciccarello	Labor	Norwood	1997–2010
Ralph Clarke	Labor/Independent ^{[5]}	Ross Smith	1993–2002
Steve Condous	Liberal	Colton	1993–2002
Patrick Conlon	Labor	Elder	1997–2014
Murray De Laine	Labor/Independent ^{[4]}	Price	1985–2002
Hon Iain Evans	Liberal	Davenport	1993–2014
Kevin Foley	Labor	Hart	1993–2011
Robyn Geraghty	Labor	Torrens	1994–2014
Hon Graham Gunn	Liberal	Stuart	1970–2010
Joan Hall	Liberal	Coles	1993–2006
Martin Hamilton-Smith	Liberal	Waite	1997–2018
Kris Hanna	Labor	Mitchell	1997–2010
John Hill	Labor	Kaurna	1997–2014
Annette Hurley	Labor	Napier	1993–2002
Hon Graham Ingerson	Liberal	Bragg	1983–2002
Hon Rob Kerin	Liberal	Frome	1993–2008
Stephanie Key	Labor	Hanson	1997–2018
Hon Dorothy Kotz	Liberal	Newland	1989–2006
Tom Koutsantonis	Labor	Peake	1997–present
Peter Lewis	Liberal/Independent ^{[2]}	Hammond	1979–2006
Hon Wayne Matthew	Liberal	Bright	1989–2006
Karlene Maywald	National	Chaffey	1997–2010
Rory McEwen	Independent	Gordon	1997–2010
John Meier	Liberal	Goyder	1982–2006
Hon John Olsen	Liberal	Kavel	1979–1990, 1992–2002
Hon John Oswald	Liberal	Morphett	1979–2002
Liz Penfold	Liberal	Flinders	1993–2010
Jennifer Rankine	Labor	Wright	1997–2018
Hon Mike Rann	Labor	Ramsay	1985–2012
Joe Scalzi	Liberal	Hartley	1993–2006
Jack Snelling	Labor	Playford	1997–2018
Lea Stevens	Labor	Elizabeth	1994–2010
Bob Such	Liberal/Independent ^{[3]}	Fisher	1989–2014
Gay Thompson	Labor	Reynell	1997–2014
Ivan Venning	Liberal	Schubert	1990–2014
Trish White	Labor	Taylor	1994–2010
Mitch Williams	Independent/Liberal ^{[1]}	MacKillop	1997–2018
Hon David Wotton	Liberal	Heysen	1975–2002
Michael Wright	Labor	Lee	1997–2014

^{1} The member for Mackillop, Mitch Williams, was elected as an independent, but rejoined the Liberal Party on 6 December 1999.
^{2} The member for Hammond, Peter Lewis, was expelled from the Liberal Party on 6 July 2000. He continued to sit in the Assembly as an independent.
^{3} The member for Fisher, Bob Such, resigned from the Liberal Party on 12 October 2000. He continued to sit in the Assembly as an independent.
^{4} The member for Price, Murray De Laine, resigned from the Labor Party on 15 August 2001 after losing preselection to recontest his seat. He served out the remainder of his term as an independent.
^{5} The member for Ross Smith, Ralph Clarke, resigned from the Labor Party on 27 November 2001 after losing preselection to recontest his seat. He served out the remainder of his term as an independent.
