= David Wilkins (politician) =

Australian politician and lawyer

David Wilkins JP MP
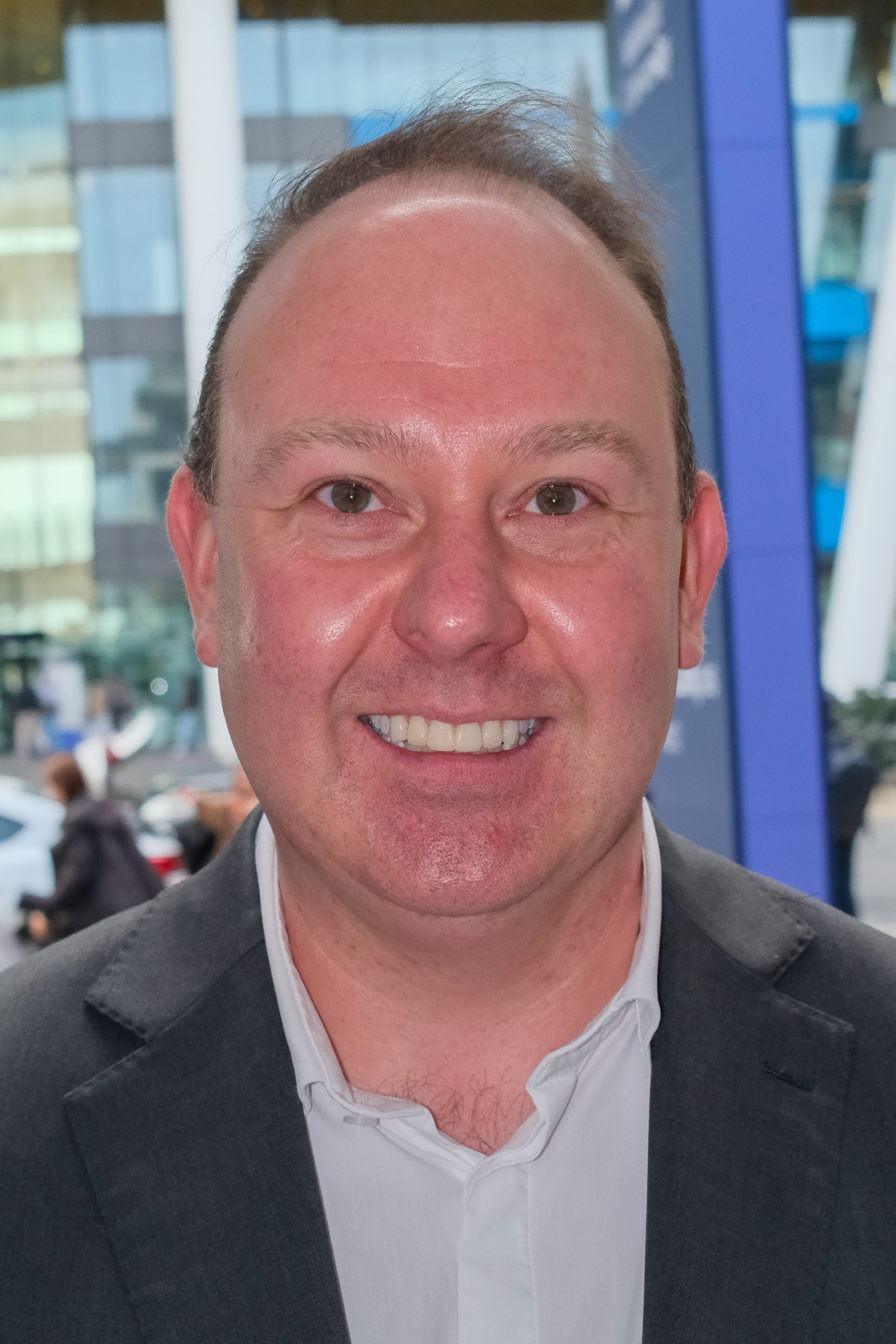
- Wilkins in 2026

Member of the South Australian House of Assembly for Lee
- Incumbent
- Assumed office 21 March 2026
- Preceded by: Stephen Mullighan

Deputy Mayor of Port Adelaide Enfield
- In office 12 November 2019 – 10 November 2020
- Mayor: Claire Boan
- Preceded by: Michael Iammarrone
- Succeeded by: Paul Russell

Councillor for the City of Port Adelaide Enfield for Semaphore Ward
- In office 10 November 2018 – 21 March 2026 Serving with Helen Wright (2018–2022); Peter McGregor (2022–2026)

Personal details
- Party: Labor
- Education: University of Adelaide; Australian National University
- Profession: Lawyer; Policy advisor

David Wilkins is an Australian Labor politician who has served as the member for Lee in the South Australian House of Assembly since the 2026 South Australian state election.

Wilkins was elected as a councillor for the City of Port Adelaide Enfield at the 2018 South Australian local elections, representing Semaphore. He served as deputy mayor from 2019 to 2020 and was re-elected to council in 2022.

Wilkins also served as chief of staff to state government minister Chris Picton, an advisor to Premier Jay Weatherill and as an electorate officer and advisor to former federal minister and member for Adelaide Kate Ellis.

Wilkins is openly gay.

South Australian House of Assembly
Preceded by Stephen Mullighan	Member for Lee; 2026–present	Incumbent
