= 1997 South Australian state election =

- 11 October 1997

All 47 seats in the South Australian House of Assembly 24 seats were needed for a majority 11 (of the 22) seats in the South Australian Legislative Council
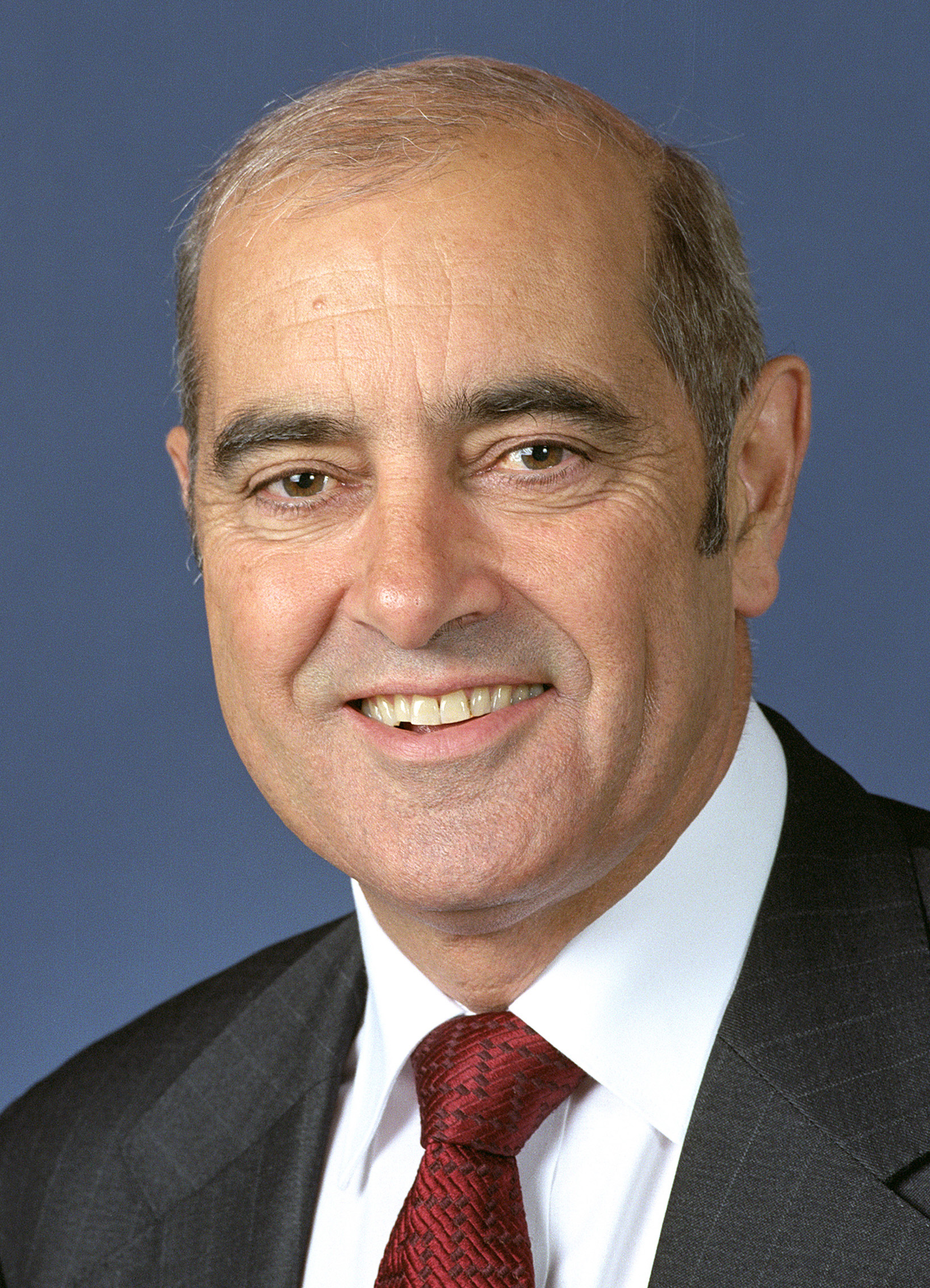

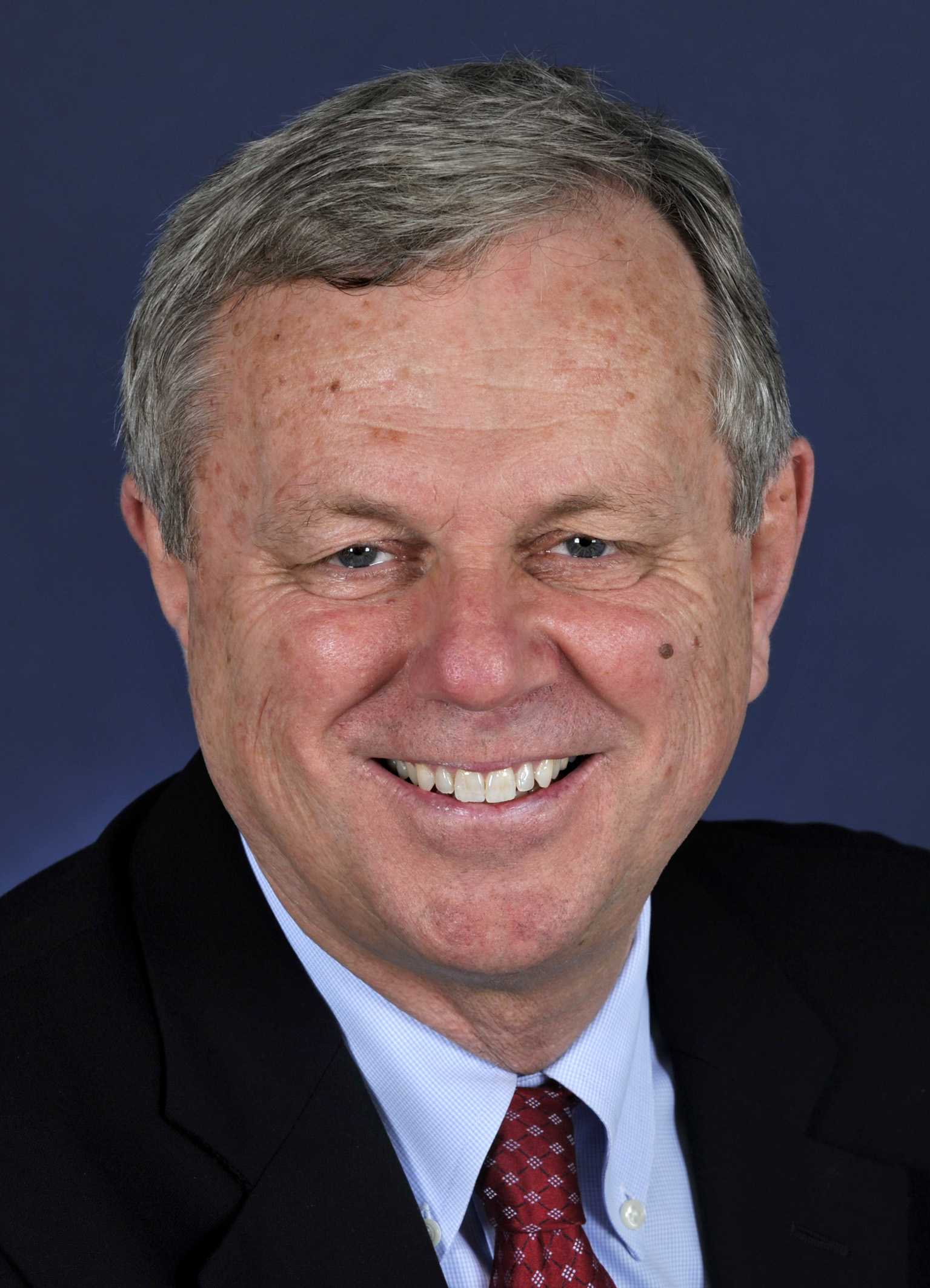
	First party	Second party
Leader	John Olsen	Mike Rann
Party	Liberal	Labor
Leader since	28 November 1996	5 November 1994
Leader's seat	Kavel	Ramsay
Seats before	36	11
Seats won	23	21
Seat change	▼13	▲10
Popular vote	359,509	312,929
Percentage	40.40%	35.16%
Swing	▼12.41	▲4.79
TPP	51.51%	48.49%
TPP swing	▼9.40	▲9.40
	Third party	Fourth party
	DEM	NAT
Leader	None	Karlene Maywald
Party	Democrats	National
Leader since		11 October 1997
Leader's seat		Chaffey (won seat)
Seats before	0	0
Seats won	0	1
Seat change	Steady	▲1
Popular vote	146,347	15,488
Percentage	16.45%	1.74%
Swing	▲7.35pp	▲0.63
Premier before election
John Olsen
Liberal
Resulting Premier
John Olsen
Liberal

State elections were held in South Australia on 11 October 1997. All 47 seats in the South Australian House of Assembly were up for election. The incumbent Liberal Party of Australia led by Premier of South Australia John Olsen defeated the Australian Labor Party led by Leader of the Opposition Mike Rann, forming a minority government with the SA Nationals and independent MPs.

== Background ==
Following the 1993 landslide to the Liberals, ending 11 years of Labor government, Labor now led by Mike Rann held just 11 seats in the House of Assembly. The Liberals held 36 seats and there were no independent or minor party members in the House of Assembly. They had held a record 37, but lost one at the 1994 Torrens by-election. However the Liberals were suffering from heightened internal tensions. Premier Dean Brown had been toppled by Industry Minister and factional rival John Olsen in a 1996 party-room coup. Olsen had been in office for just over 10 months on election day.

== Key dates ==
- Issue of writ: 13 September 1997
- Close of electoral rolls: 22 September 1997
- Close of nominations: Friday 26 September 1997, at noon
- Polling day: 11 October 1997
- Return of writ: On or before 14 November 1997 (actually returned 7 November)

== Results ==
=== House of Assembly ===
South Australian state election, 11 October 1997 House of Assembly << 1993–2002 >>
Enrolled voters	1,010,753				
Votes cast	927,344		Turnout	91.75	-1.82
Informal votes	37,430		Informal	4.04	+0.94
Summary of votes by party
Party	Primary votes	%	Swing	Seats	Change
Liberal	359,509	40.40	▼-12.41	23	13
Labor	312,929	35.16	▲+4.79	21	+ 10
Democrats	146,347	16.45	▲+7.35	0	0
National	15,488	1.74	▲+0.63	1	+ 1
United Australia	13,569	1.52	New	0	0
Independent	27,870	3.13	▲+0.01	1	+ 1
Independent Liberal	6,970	0.78	New	1	+ 1
Other	7,232	0.81	*	0	0
Total	889,914			47	
Two-party-preferred
Liberal	458,399	51.51	▼–9.40		
Labor	431,515	48.49	▲+9.40		

Popular vote
Liberal	40.40%
Labor	35.16%
Democrats	16.45%
Independents	3.91%
National	1.74%
United Australia	1.52%
Others	0.81%

Two-party-preferred vote
Liberal	51.51%
Labor	48.49%

Seats
Liberal	48.94%
Labor	44.68%
Independents	4.26%
National	2.13%

=== Seats changing hands ===
Seat	Pre-1997			Swing	Post-1997		
Seat	Party	Member	Margin	Swing	Margin	Member	Party
Chaffey	Liberal	Kent Andrew	6.3	8.9	1.0	Karlene Maywald	National SA
Elder	Liberal	David Wade	3.5	6.1	2.6	Patrick Conlon	Labor
Florey	Liberal	Sam Bass	11.0	12.3	1.3	Frances Bedford	Labor
Gordon	Liberal	Harold Allison	21.5	N/A	0.1	Rory McEwen	Independent
Hanson	Liberal	Stewart Leggett	1.9	7.5	5.6	Steph Key	Labor
Kaurna	Liberal	Lorraine Rosenberg	2.4	8.2	5.8	John Hill	Labor
Lee	Liberal	Joe Rossi	1.0	8.1	7.1	Michael Wright	Labor
MacKillop	Liberal	Dale Baker	29.4	N/A	7.9	Mitch Williams	Independent
Mitchell	Liberal	Colin Caudell	9.4	10.3	0.9	Kris Hanna	Labor
Norwood	Liberal	John Cummins	7.4	8.2	0.8	Vini Ciccarello	Labor
Peake	Liberal	Heini Becker	5.0	12.0	7.0	Tom Koutsantonis	Labor
Reynell	Liberal	Julie Greig	2.5	6.2	3.7	Gay Thompson	Labor
Wright	Liberal	Scott Ashenden	3.3	6.4	3.1	Jennifer Rankine	Labor

- Members in italics did not recontest their seats.
- In addition, Labor retained the seat of Torrens, which it had gained from the Liberals at the 1994 by-election.

Labor needed a 13-seat swing to make Rann premier, a deficit thought insurmountable before the election. However, to the surprise of most observers, Olsen lost the massive majority he'd inherited from Brown. Labor polled exceptionally well, regaining much of what it had lost in its severe defeat of four years earlier. Indeed, on election night many Liberal observers feared that Labor had managed the swing it needed to regain government. Ultimately, Labor picked up 10 seats, three seats short of victory. The Liberals lost a massive 13 seats: 10 to Labor, 1 to the Nationals, and 2 to conservative independents. Labor received a record two-party swing of 9.4 percent, as opposed to the previous record of 8.9 percent to the Liberals at the last election. Olsen was forced to seek the support of the Nationals and the independents to stay in office at the helm of a minority government.

The Liberals briefly regained a majority when Mitch Williams rejoined the Liberal Party in 1999, but lost it again in 2000 when it expelled Peter Lewis from the party in 2000, and Bob Such resigned from the Liberal Party later in 2000. However they continued to govern with the support of the Nationals and independents until the 2002 election.

=== Legislative Council ===
South Australian state election, 11 October 1997 Legislative Council << 1993–2002 >>
Enrolled voters	1,010,753				
Votes cast	937,026		Turnout	92.71	–0.91
Informal votes	40,523		Informal	4.32	+0.78
Summary of votes by party
Party	Primary votes	%	Swing	Seats won	Seats held
Liberal	339,064	37.82	▼–13.99	4	10
Labor	274,098	30.57	▲+3.17	4	8
Democrats	149,660	16.69	▲+8.65	2	3
No Pokies	25,630	2.86	New	1	1
HEMP	15,432	1.72	▼–0.08	0	0
Greens	15,377	1.72	▼–0.02	0	0
Grey Power	14,261	1.59	▼–0.01	0	0
United Australia	11,920	1.33	New	0	0
National	9,233	1.03	▲+0.31	0	0
Australia First	9,150	1.02	New	0	0
Recreation and Fishing	7,048	0.79	New	0	0
Overtaxed Motorists	6,024	0.67	New	0	0
Other	19,606	2.18	*	0	0
Total	896,503			11	22

In the Legislative Council, the Australian Democrats won two seats for the first time. Elected were 4 Liberal, 4 Labor, 2 Australian Democrats, and No Pokies candidate Nick Xenophon. Carrying over from the 1993 election were 6 Liberal, 4 Labor, 1 Democrat, leaving total numbers at 10 Liberal, 8 Labor, 3 Democrats, 1 No Pokies.

The election was notable for the Australian Democrats' strongest performance in South Australia, winning two Legislative Council seats at an election for the only time in their history (though their predecessors, the Liberal Movement (LM), had won two Legislative Council seats on a higher primary vote in the 1975 election). The Democrats also finished second after preferences in seven House of Assembly seats (compared to three for the LM in 1975). However, it marked the peak for Democrats' influence in South Australia. From here on they would slowly lose numbers and influence, winning only one more seat (in 2002), and losing their remaining parliamentary representation as of the 2010 election.

Labor Upper House members Terry Cameron and Trevor Crothers would resign from the party in 1998 and 1999 respectively, to support the Liberals over the privatisation of ETSA. This also meant the Democrats lost sole balance of power for the first time since 1985.

== Post-election pendulum ==
Liberal seats (26)
Marginal
Gordon	Rory McEwen	IND	0.1% v LIB
Hartley	Joe Scalzi	LIB	0.7%
Stuart	Graham Gunn	LIB	1.5%
Heysen	David Wotton	LIB	1.9% v AD
Chaffey	Karlene Maywald	NAT	2.6% v LIB
Frome	Rob Kerin	LIB	2.9%
Colton	Steve Condous	LIB	4.0%
Davenport	Iain Evans	LIB	4.3% v AD
Unley	Mark Brindal	LIB	4.5%
Mawson	Robert Brokenshire	LIB	4.7%
Adelaide	Michael Armitage	LIB	5.4%
Waite	Martin Hamilton-Smith	LIB	5.9% v AD
Fairly safe
Bright	Wayne Matthew	LIB	6.2%
Light	Malcolm Buckby	LIB	6.3%
Kavel	John Olsen	LIB	6.3% v AD
Finniss	Dean Brown	LIB	7.3% v AD
Coles	Joan Hall	LIB	7.8%
MacKillop	Mitch Williams	IND	7.9% v LIB
Newland	Dorothy Kotz	LIB	8.0%
Schubert	Ivan Venning	LIB	8.7% v AD
Fisher	Bob Such	LIB	9.8%
Flinders	Liz Penfold	LIB	10.0% v NAT
Safe
Morphett	John Oswald	LIB	13.0%
Hammond	Peter Lewis	LIB	14.7%
Goyder	John Meier	LIB	17.2%
Bragg	Graham Ingerson	LIB	18.8%

Labor seats (21)
Marginal
Norwood	Vini Ciccarello	ALP	0.8%
Mitchell	Kris Hanna	ALP	0.9%
Florey	Frances Bedford	ALP	1.3%
Elder	Pat Conlon	ALP	2.6%
Wright	Jennifer Rankine	ALP	3.1%
Reynell	Gay Thompson	ALP	3.7%
Hanson	Steph Key	ALP	5.6%
Kaurna	John Hill	ALP	5.8%
Fairly safe
Peake	Tom Koutsantonis	ALP	7.0%
Lee	Michael Wright	ALP	7.1%
Napier	Annette Hurley	ALP	9.5% v AD
Safe
Torrens	Robyn Geraghty	ALP	10.1%
Giles	Lyn Breuer	ALP	11.4%
Playford	Jack Snelling	ALP	12.9%
Elizabeth	Lea Stevens	ALP	14.3%
Ross Smith	Ralph Clarke	ALP	14.8%
Ramsay	Mike Rann	ALP	18.2%
Taylor	Trish White	ALP	22.2%
Hart	Kevin Foley	ALP	22.7%
Spence	Michael Atkinson	ALP	23.3%
Price	Murray De Laine	ALP	24.4%

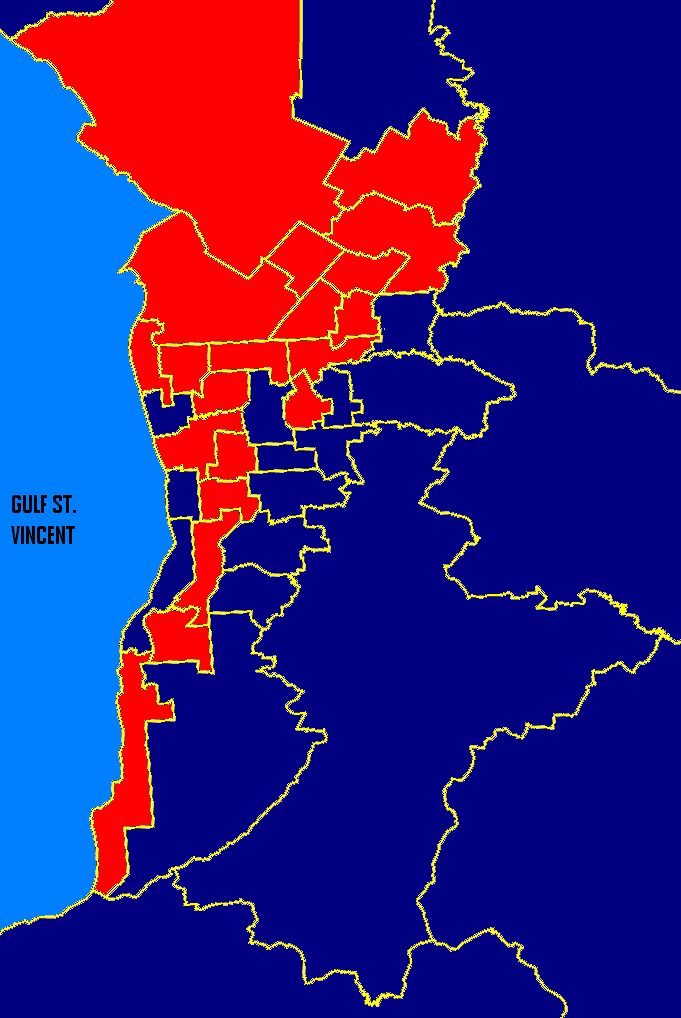
Metro SA: ALP in red, Liberal in blue. These boundaries are based on the 2006 electoral redistribution.

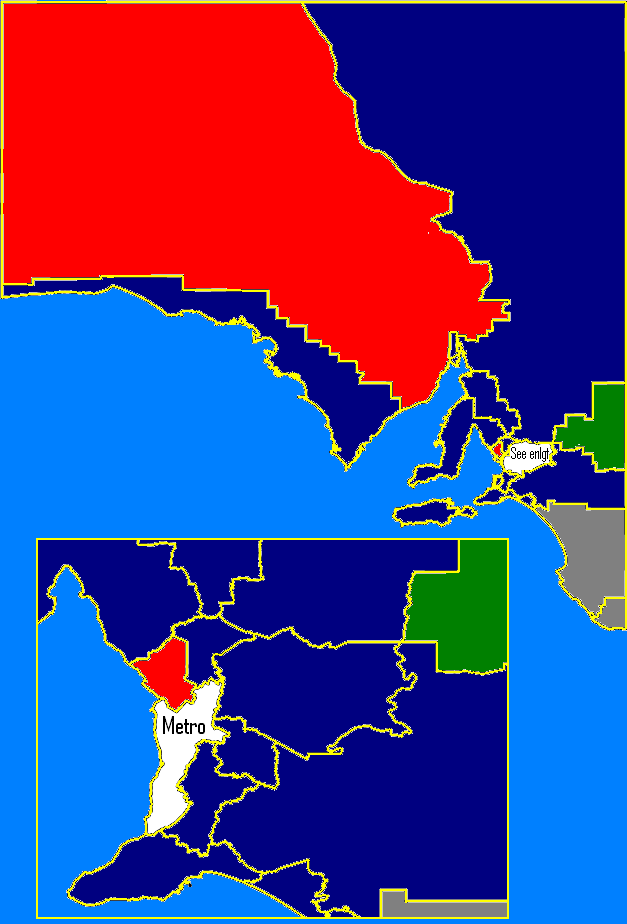
Rural SA: ALP in red, Liberal in blue, Independents in white, Nationals in green. These boundaries are based on the 2006 electoral redistribution.

== Legacy ==
The 1997 result put Labor within striking distance of winning government at the next election in 2002. John Olsen was left with internal disquiet over the leadership challenge and poor election result while his opponent, Mike Rann, was seen to have 'won' the campaign despite losing the election.

On 6 February 2007, Mike Rann told parliament that some in the Liberal party had leaked information to him before and during the election campaign. The following quote by Rann is from Hansard on 6/2/2007 :

"You asked me a question and I will give you a 55-minute answer, because you will remember one day when I came into this place and I had, I think, 880 pages of cabinet and other documents... I remember being telephoned and told to go to a certain cafe, not in a white car but in a taxi, and then to walk in a zigzag fashion through the streets of a suburb, where I was to be handed cabinet documents. So much for their cabinet solidarity and cabinet confidentiality! There was a queue on the telephone telling us what had happened the day before. It was the same during the 1997 election campaign. People thought, 'How does this guy (the leader of the opposition at the time) know intuitively exactly what John Olsen is doing the next day?' It was because I was being phoned and told! So, do not talk to me about cabinet solidarity lest I come in here and start naming names, which will set off another generation of disputation on the other side of the house. Anyway, cabinet approved, among other things, on 20 December 2006 minister Lomax-Smith's proposed statement and approved her to announce publicly that she opposed the proposal in cabinet. She did so because we agreed that she should be able to do so. Somehow I do not think that John Olsen agreed to what happened when I was getting the phone call at 6 o'clock in the morning and at midnight, and walking in a zigzag pattern through suburbs to be handed a cabinet bag and cabinet documents. We have a different approach. We agreed to it. It was a cabinet decision to agree to it. So, please, ask me some more questions, because there were two different camps involved in this leaking to the then poor unpopular leader of the opposition, and I am more than happy to name names."

== See also ==
- Candidates of the South Australian state election, 1997
- Members of the South Australian House of Assembly, 1997-2002
- Members of the South Australian Legislative Council, 1997-2002
- Results of the South Australian state election, 1997 (House of Assembly)
- Results of the 1997 South Australian state election (Legislative Council)
