= Stephen Mullighan =

Australian politician

The Honourable Stephen Mullighan GAICD
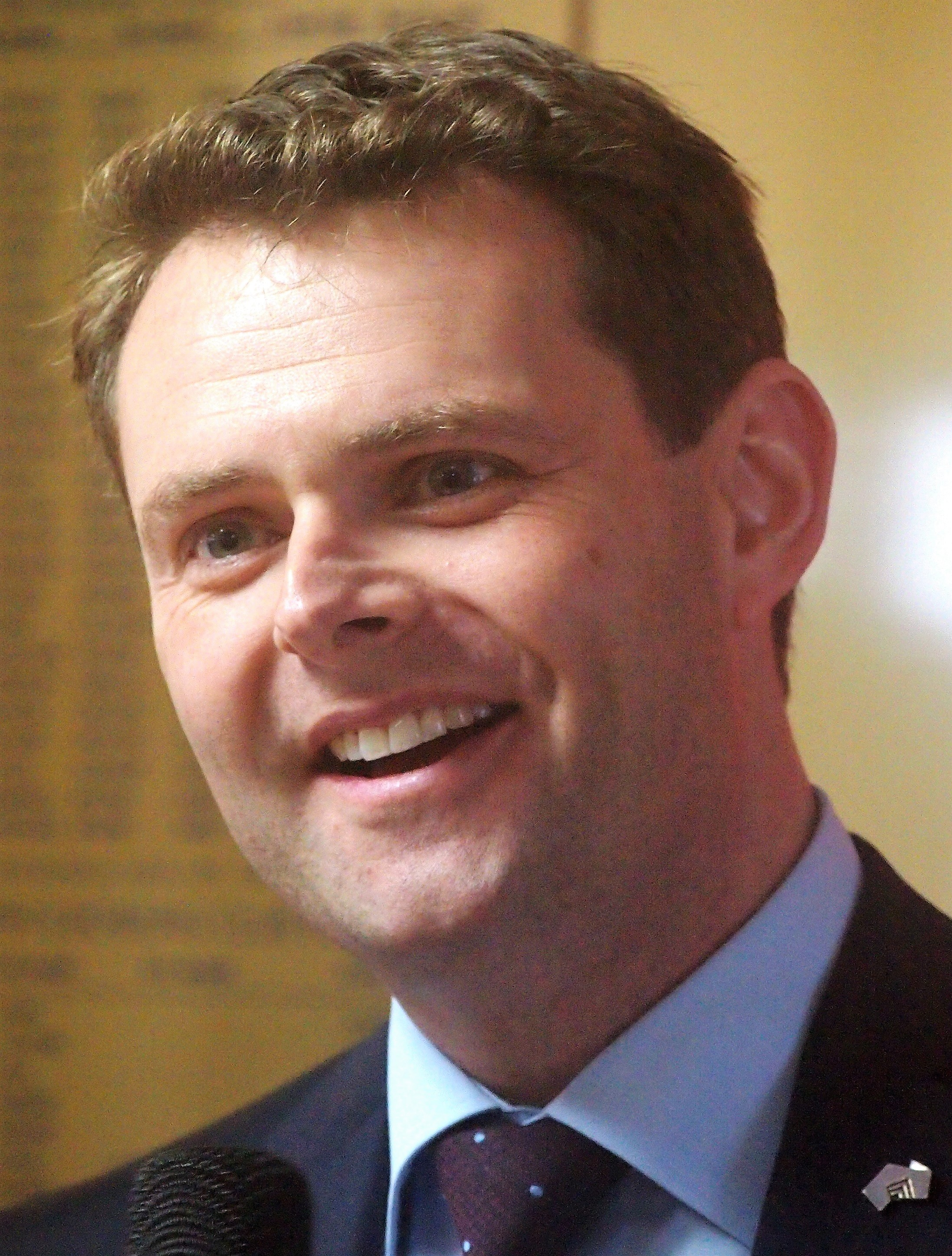
- Mullighan in 2016

Treasurer of South Australia
- In office 21 March 2022 – 19 September 2025
- Premier: Peter Malinauskas
- Preceded by: Rob Lucas
- Succeeded by: Tom Koutsantonis
Previous ministerial positions
Minister for Police
In office 29 January 2025 – 19 September 2025
Premier	Peter Malinauskas
Preceded by	Dan Cregan
Succeeded by	Blair Boyer
Minister for Defence and Space Industries
In office 15 April 2024 – 19 September 2025
Premier	Peter Malinauskas
Preceded by	Susan Close
Succeeded by	Peter Malinauskas
Minister for Transport and Infrastructure
In office 26 March 2014 – 18 March 2018
Premier	Jay Weatherill
Preceded by	Tom Koutsantonis
Succeeded by	Stephan Knoll (as Minister for Transport, Infrastructure and Local Government)
Minister for Housing and Urban Development
In office 19 January 2016 – 19 March 2018
Premier	Jay Weatherill
Preceded by	John Rau
Succeeded by	Position abolished
Minister Assisting the Minister for Housing and Urban Development Minister Assisting the Minister for Planning
In office 26 March 2014 – 19 January 2016
- Premier: Jay Weatherill

Member of the South Australian House of Assembly for Lee
- In office 15 March 2014 – 20 March 2026
- Preceded by: Michael Wright
- Succeeded by: David Wilkins

Personal details
- Born: Stephen Campbell Mullighan; 1978 or 1979 (age 47–48)
- Party: Labor
- Spouse: Antonia Mullighan
- Relations: Ted Mullighan (father)
- Education: University of Adelaide
- Occupation: Strategic and governance advisor

Hon Stephen Campbell Mullighan GAICD (born 1978 or 1979) is a former Australian politician who represented the South Australian House of Assembly seat of Lee for the Labor Party from 2014 to 2026. He served as the Treasurer of South Australia in the First Malinauskas ministry from 2022 to 2025.

== Political career ==
Mullighan entered cabinet in March 2014 and remained there until the March 2018 election when his party lost office.

He previously held the portfolios of Minister for Defence and Space Industries (April 2024 to September 2025), Minister for Police (January 2025 to September 2025), Minister for Transport and Infrastructure (March 2014 to March 2018), Minister for Housing and Urban Development (January 2016 to March 2018), Member of the House of Assembly, Parliament of South Australia, Member for Lee (March 2014 to March 2026).

He is aligned with the Labor Right faction.

South Australian House of Assembly
Preceded by Michael Wright	Member for Lee; 2014–2026	Succeeded by David Wilkins
Political offices
Preceded by Tom Koutsantonis	Minister for Transport and Infrastructure; 2014–2018	Succeeded by Stephan Knoll as Minister for Transport, Infrastructure and Local Government
Preceded by John Rau	Minister for Housing and Urban Development; 2016–2018	Succeeded by Stephan Knoll as Minister for Planning
Preceded by Rob Lucas	Treasurer of South Australia; 2022–2025	Succeeded by Tom Koutsantonis
