= Jason Virgo =

Australian politician

Jason Virgo MP
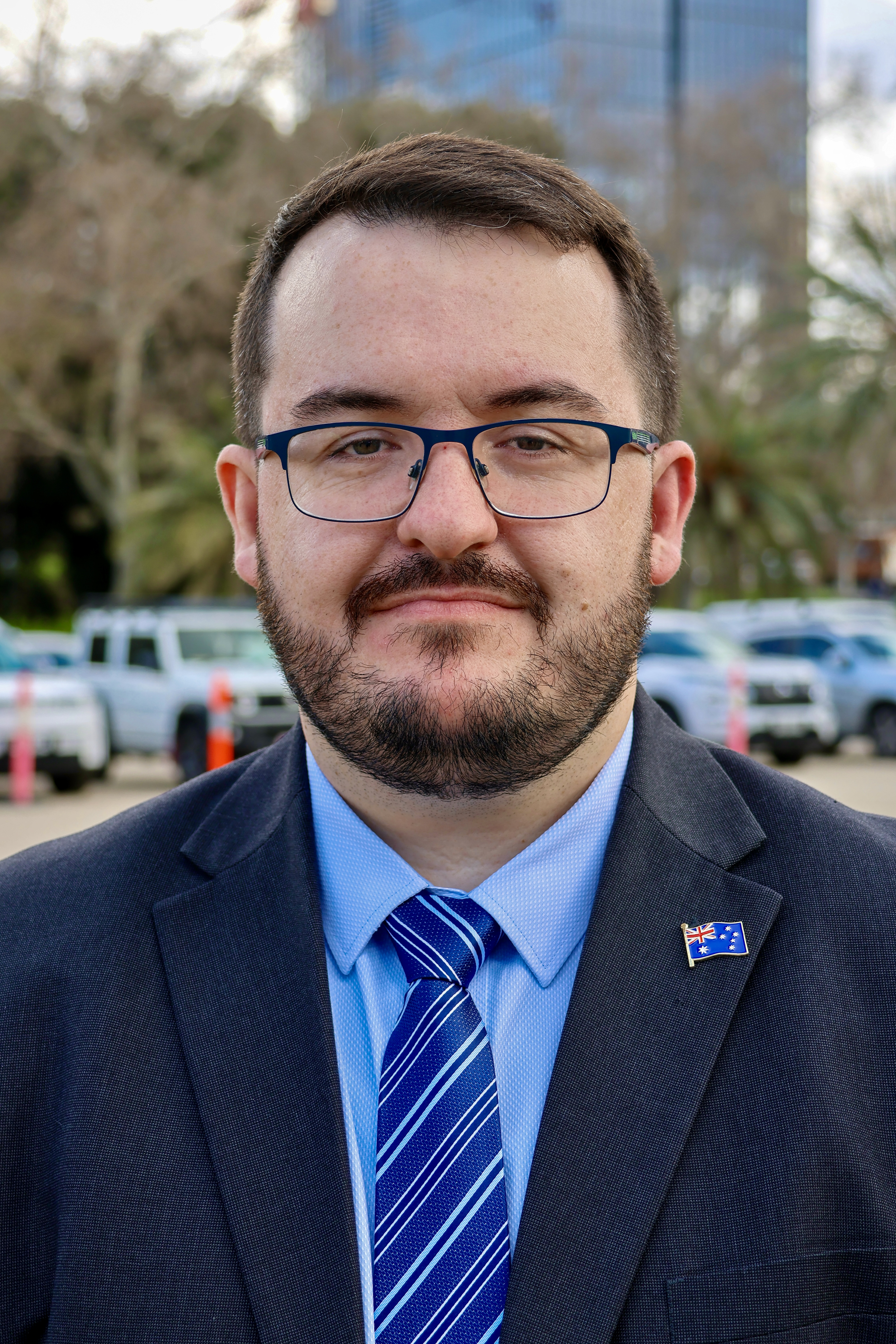
- Virgo in 2026

Member of the South Australian House of Assembly for MacKillop
- Incumbent
- Assumed office 21 March 2026
- Preceded by: Nick McBride

Member of the Mount Gambier City Council
- In office 3 April 2023 – 30 March 2026
- Preceded by: Ben Hood

Personal details
- Born: 1990 or 1991 (age 35–36)
- Party: One Nation
- Other political affiliations: Sex Party; Labor Party

Jason Virgo (born 1990 or 1991) is an Australian politician. He was elected to the South Australian House of Assembly at the 2026 state election, representing the district of MacKillop for One Nation. He previously served on the Mount Gambier City Council from 2023 to 2026. Virgo is formerly a member of the Labor Party and the Sex Party, and stood for election representing the latter in 2010 and 2013.

== Politics ==
=== Early involvement and activism ===
Virgo has said he joined the Labor Party at the age of 16 and the Sex Party at 19. Virgo also stated that he had begun organising rallies in support of marriage equality as a teenager.

Virgo served as secretary of the Mount Gambier branch of the Australian Labor Party (ALP) for a period, and was twice a candidate for the Australian Sex Party, standing at the 2010 and 2013 federal elections for the party in the Senate.In 2011 he helped organise a rally outside Parliament House, Adelaide, in support of the International Day Against Homophobia, which "ended in violence after it was crashed by Christian protesters".

=== Local government ===
Virgo stood for the Mount Gambier City Council in 2022, but was unsuccessful. However, when Ben Hood resigned from council in 2023 to take up a seat in the Legislative Council, Virgo was elected to Mount Gambier City Council via countback.

As a councillor, Virgo called for the return of the Autofest motoring event to Mount Gambier, to provide an alternative to unsafe hooning on the roads.

=== State politics ===
Virgo was the One Nation candidate for MacKillop at the 2026 state election, and took leave from council to focus on his candidacy. Following the 2026 state election, MacKillop remained in doubt for a number of days. While Nick McBride, the outgoing MP, had clearly been defeated, there was still a possibility that Virgo could be overtaken by Liberal candidate Rebekah Rosser. However, Virgo was ultimately successful, holding his lead against Rosser to become the new MP for MacKillop. As a result, he resigned from his council seat, effective 30 March.

== Personal life ==
Virgo was born in 1990 or 1991 and raised in Port MacDonnell, South Australia. He holds the degree of Bachelor of Communications. At the time of his election to parliament he was working in a "security-based role in Mount Gambier" and in the process of qualifying to become a mortgage broker. He previously worked for the District Council of Grant and at the Christmas Island Immigration Detention Centre.

Virgo is openly gay. Virgo's partner is an Indonesian-born Muslim.

South Australian House of Assembly
Preceded by Nick McBride	Member for MacKillop; 2026–present	Incumbent
