= Nick McBride =

Australian politician

Nick McBride MP

Member of the South Australian House of Assembly for MacKillop
- In office 17 March 2018 – 21 March 2026
- Preceded by: Mitch Williams
- Succeeded by: Jason Virgo

Personal details
- Party: Independent
- Other political affiliations: Liberal (until 2023)
- Education: Kingston Area School, Prince Alfred College
- Occupation: Politician, grazier
- Website: nickmcbride.com.au

Philip Nicholas McBride is an Australian former politician. He served as the member for MacKillop in the South Australian House of Assembly from 2018 until his defeat at the 2026 state election.

== Political career ==
McBride was a member of the Liberal Party until 5 July 2023, when he announced that he was quitting the party to sit as an independent in the House of Assembly. He cited “dark forces” and "divisive factionalism" within the South Australia Liberal Party as the reason for his decision, generally considered to be a reference to the SA Liberal’s increasingly right-wing positions, and the dramatic increase of conservative Pentecostal party members.

== Other activities ==
McBride was president of the Grassland Society of South Australia in 2017.

== Personal life ==
McBride's great-grandfather was Sir Philip McBride, a founding member of the Liberal Party of Australia and Minister for Defence in the Menzies Government. McBride is also a grazier; his family has owned Conmurra Station since the 1930s.

McBride allegedly assaulted his wife in April 2025 and was charged with three counts of assault. On Saturday 27 December 2025, he was arrested at his home at Conmurra and charged with aggravated assault, breaching bail, and breaching the terms of an intervention order.

South Australian House of Assembly
Preceded by Mitch Williams	Member for MacKillop; 2018–2026	Succeeded by Jason Virgo
