= Kate Reynolds =

Australian politician (born 1962)

Member of the South Australian Legislative Council
- In office 17 February 2003 – 17 March 2006
- Preceded by: Mike Elliott
- Succeeded by: Mark Parnell

Personal details
- Born: Kathryn Joy Reynolds
- Party: Australian Democrats

Kathryn Joy Reynolds (born 1962, now McPhee) is an Australian former politician. She was an Australian Democrats member of the South Australian Legislative Council from 2003 to 2006.

Prior to 2003, Reynolds operated her own business On-Track Training, wrote two books (Just a Tick - A Best Practice Survival Guide for Committees and Boards of Management and Take Your Partner for the Corporate Tango) and taught community development at TAFE. Before entering politics she was instrumental in the establishment of the Torrens Valley Community Centre and was active on various local committees including the Adelaide Hills Tourism Association. From 1997 to 2003 she served on the Policy Council of the South Australian Council of Social Service. She served a term as an elected member on the District Council of Mount Pleasant prior to its amalgamation with the Barossa Council. Reynolds was the Democrats candidate for the safe Liberal seat of Schubert at the 2002 state election, polling a credible 8.9% of the vote. She received a second opportunity a year later when she was selected by the party to fill a casual vacancy in the Legislative Council caused by the resignation from politics of then-Democrats leader Mike Elliott.

During her time as a sitting member, Reynolds spoke out on a range of issues including the treatment of asylum seekers at the controversial Baxter Detention Centre in South Australia's outback, and campaigned for increased social housing for disadvantaged people and increased funds for child protection and for people with disabilities. She also campaigned for equal rights before the law for same sex couples and sought to have South Australia's once ground breaking Equal Opportunity law updated.

Reynolds was described by Greg Kelton, the senior political writer with Adelaide's only daily newspaper as having "a finely tuned social conscience and has not been scared to tackle humanitarian issues such as refugees and asylum seekers".

She served on the Aboriginal Lands Parliamentary Standing Committee, the Select Committee on the Status of Fathers in South Australia and the Select Committee on Pricing, Refining, Storage and Supply of Fuel in South Australia.

The popularity of the Democrats had dropped significantly by the time of the 2006 election, with the party having lost all four senators up for re-election at the federal election in 2004. The retirement of fellow Democrat MLC Ian Gilfillan saw Reynolds preselected in the top position of the Democrat ticket, but the party faced a major struggle to retain even one seat. The party's vote dropped from 7.3% to 1.8% on election day, and Reynolds lost her seat. The loss of both the party's seats up for re-election saw Sandra Kanck become the only remaining Democrat MLC in the Legislative Council.

Reynolds (McPhee) is an approved Community Visitor with the Community Visitor Scheme. She is member of Impact 100 SA and is currently Secretary of the Parliament of SA Former Members Association. Reynolds was a Committee Member of the Unley Road Association Inc. until her resignation in October 2023. She was variously Secretary and President of Desert Challenge Inc. from 2008 to 2018. From 2007 to 2009, Reynolds served as a board member of Arts Access SA Inc.

She now operates her own business Liquorice Allsorts Consulting which provides advice and services for small not-for-profit organisations. In May 2025 she published an updated and expanded version of Just A Tick - A Best Practice Guide for Committees and Boards of Management. In May 2026 she launched "The Committee Room" podcast with co-host Kate Hartwig.
