= Dale Baker =

Australian politician

Leader of the Opposition in South Australia
- In office 12 January 1990 – 11 May 1992
- Deputy: Stephen Baker
- Preceded by: John Olsen
- Succeeded by: Dean Brown

Leader of the South Australian Liberal Party
- In office 12 January 1990 – 11 May 1992
- Deputy: Stephen Baker
- Preceded by: John Olsen
- Succeeded by: Dean Brown

Member of the South Australian Parliament for MacKillop
- In office 11 December 1993 – 11 October 1997
- Preceded by: new seat
- Succeeded by: Mitch Williams

Member of the South Australian Parliament for Victoria
- In office 7 December 1985 – 11 December 1993
- Preceded by: Allan Rodda
- Succeeded by: seat abolished

Personal details
- Born: Dale Spehr Baker; 30 January 1939
- Died: 27 March 2012 (aged 73)
- Political party: Liberal Party of Australia (SA)

Dale Spehr Baker (30 January 1939 – 27 March 2012) was an Australian politician, serving as South Australian Opposition Leader and Leader of the South Australian Division of the Liberal Party of Australia from 1990 to 1992.

== Parliament ==
Baker was elected member for the south-eastern rural seat of Victoria from the 1985 state election. Liberal leader John Olsen resigned following the 1989 state election loss with Baker succeeding him as Liberal leader two months later in January 1990.

On just 23 percent, in early 1990 he recorded the lowest Newspoll leadership approval rating in South Australian history. However, his disapproval rating was also very low at just 11 percent. In itself a record, at 66 percent, an entire two-thirds of respondents were uncommitted. From late 1991, he entered a net negative rating from which he did not recover.

Baker did not lead the Liberals to an election, resigning from the leadership in 1992, to be succeeded by Dean Brown. Baker's seat of Victoria was renamed to MacKillop from the 1993 state election. After the Liberals' landslide victory that year, Baker served as a minister under both Brown and Olsen. He remained in parliament until the 1997 state election where he unexpectedly lost his seat to Liberal-turned-independent Mitch Williams, who rejoined the Liberals in 1999.

== Later life ==
Baker had motor neurone disease (ALS) and was a supporter of voluntary euthanasia. Baker died on 27 March 2012 from motor neurone disease.

Political offices
Preceded by John Olsen	Leader of the Opposition in South Australia; 1990–1992	Succeeded by Dean Brown
Preceded by Frank Blevins as Minister for Mineral Resources	Minister for Mines and Energy; 1993–1995	Succeeded by Stephen Baker
Preceded by Terry Groom	Minister for Primary Industries; 1993–1995	Succeeded by Rob Kerin
Vacant Title last held by Frank Blevins (1992)	Minister for Finance; 1996–1997	Succeeded by Stephen Baker
Preceded by Stephen Baker as Minister for Mines and Energy	Minister for Mines; 1996–1997	Succeeded by Rob Kerin as Minister for Primary Industries, Natural Resources and Regional Development
Parliament of South Australia
Preceded by Allan Rodda	Member for Victoria; 1985–1993	Seat abolished
New seat	Member for MacKillop; 1993–1997	Succeeded by Mitch Williams
Party political offices
Preceded by John Olsen	Leader of the Liberal Party of Australia (South Australian Division); 1990–1992	Succeeded by Dean Brown
