= United Australia Party (1997) =

Former political party in South Australia

The United Australia Party was a minor political party in South Australia, led by Ellis Wayland. It is not related to the former United Australia Party of 1931–1945.

It contested the 1997 election, running 16 candidates and gained 1.5% of the vote in the Lower House, and ran 3 candidates and gained 1.3% of the vote in the Upper House. None of its candidates were successful and the party was disbanded after the election.

== See also ==
- 1997 South Australian state election
- Candidates of the South Australian state election, 1997
