= Mitch Williams (politician) =

Australian politician

Deputy Leader of the South Australian Liberal Party
- In office 6 April 2010 – 23 October 2012
- Leader: Isobel Redmond
- Preceded by: Martin Hamilton-Smith
- Succeeded by: Steven Marshall

Member of the South Australian Parliament for MacKillop
- In office 11 October 1997 – 17 March 2018
- Preceded by: Dale Baker
- Succeeded by: Nick McBride

Personal details
- Born: Michael Richard Williams; 27 June 1953 (age 73)
- Party: Liberal Party of Australia (SA) (prior to 1997, 1999–current); Independent (1997–1999)

Michael Richard "Mitch" Williams (born 27 June 1953) is a farmer and former deputy leader of the South Australian Division of the Liberal Party of Australia. He resigned from the Liberals and was elected to the safe Liberal seat of MacKillop in the state's south east at the 1997 election as an independent, but he re-joined the Liberals in 1999. He retained the seat as a Liberal in 2002 and represented it until his retirement in 2018.

== Political career ==
Williams was a member of the Liberal Party when he resigned in 1997 to run against Dale Baker as an independent in MacKillop, based on Millicent. Williams took advantage of a public backlash against Baker, who was accused of impropriety over a forestry land deal. At the 1997 election, Williams halved Baker's primary vote and was elected on Labor preferences.

Williams was one of three conservative crossbenchers whose support kept the Liberal government of John Olsen in office after the Liberals lost their previous overwhelming majority. He rejoined the Liberal Party in December 1999, giving the Liberals a majority of one seat until Peter Lewis was expelled from the party in July 2000. Williams was handily re-elected in MacKillop in 2002, 2006, 2010, and 2014.

Williams was elected unopposed as Deputy Leader of the Liberal Party in South Australia on 6 April 2010.

On 19 October 2012, Martin Hamilton-Smith announced he would be challenging Isobel Redmond for the parliamentary leadership of the South Australian Liberal Party, with Steven Marshall challenging Williams for the deputy leadership. A partyroom ballot occurred on 23 October 2012, Redmond retained the leadership by one vote, however Marshall was elected to the deputy leadership after Williams withdrew at the last minute.

Williams did not re-contest his seat at the 2018 election.

== Political views ==
In 2014, Williams personally advocated for reform of the Freedom of Information Act. Williams believes that current legislation allows Ministers unprecedented power to block the release of documents outright. He has drawn attention to more progressive legislation implemented in New Zealand as a potential future model for South Australia. Williams believes that the New Zealand analog favours release over suppression, and points out that it assumes that all government documents are in the public interest and fit for release unless proven otherwise. As of September 2014, Williams has not formally presented a call for FoI reform to his party.

Political offices
Preceded by Martin Hamilton-Smith	Deputy Leader of the Opposition in South Australia; 2010–2012	Succeeded by Steven Marshall
Parliament of South Australia
Preceded by Dale Baker	Member for MacKillop; 1997–2018	Succeeded by Nick McBride
