= Electoral district of Lee =

South Australian state electoral district

Lee South Australia—House of Assembly
- Interactive map of electoral district boundaries
- State: South Australia
- Created: 1993
- MP: David Wilkins
- Party: Labor
- Namesake: Mary Lee
- Electors: 26,500 (2018)
- Area: 18.9 km^{2} (7.3 sq mi)
- Demographic: Metropolitan
- Coordinates: 34°51′31″S 138°29′56″E
Electorates around Lee:
Gulf St Vincent	Port Adelaide	Port Adelaide
Gulf St Vincent	Lee	Cheltenham
Gulf St Vincent	Colton	West Torrens

Footnotes
- Electoral District map

Lee is a single-member electoral district for the South Australian House of Assembly. Named after the women's suffrage campaigner Mary Lee, it is an 18.9 km^{2} suburban electorate on Adelaide's north-western beaches, taking in the suburbs of Grange, Royal Park, Seaton, Semaphore Park, Tennyson, West Lakes, and West Lakes Shore.

Lee was created as a fairly safe Labor electorate in the 1991 electoral distribution to replace the abolished electoral district of Albert Park and absorbed half of the abolished electoral district of Semaphore. The first member for Lee, elected at the 1993 election, was controversial Liberal MP Joe Rossi, with the governments smallest margin of 1.1 percent; Rossi's election was unexpected, but was part of a large swing away from Labor throughout the state. At the 1997 election there were large swings back to Labor. Rossi's small margin meant he was one of the first to be defeated. He was replaced by Labor's Michael Wright.

Port Adelaide Enfield Mayor Gary Johanson, who contested the 2012 Port Adelaide by-election as an independent, contested Lee at the 2014 election. Wright did not contest the 2014 election. Labor candidate Stephen Mullighan won the election with a reduced 4.5 percent two-party preferred margin.

== Members for Lee ==
Member	Party	Term
Joe Rossi	Liberal	1993–1997
Michael Wright	Labor	1997–2014
Stephen Mullighan	Labor	2014–2026
David Wilkins	Labor	2026–present

== Election results ==
2026 South Australian state election: Lee
Party	Candidate	Votes	%	±%
Labor	David Wilkins	3,979	45.0	−6.4
One Nation	Fabio Sturm	2,162	24.4	+24.4
Greens	Brett Ferris	1,152	13.0	+4.6
Liberal	Merlindie Fardone	1,140	12.9	−20.9
Family First	Krystal Schulz	189	2.1	−4.2
Real Change	Vasko Vukoje	88	1.0	+1.0
Fair Go	Sarah McGrath	84	1.0	+1.0
Australian Family	Bill Day	51	0.6	+0.6
Total formal votes		8,845	95.9	
Informal votes		380	4.1	
Turnout		9,225		
Two-candidate-preferred result
Labor	David Wilkins	5,467	61.8	+0.3
One Nation	Fabio Sturm	3,378	38.2	+38.2
Labor hold		Swing	+0.3	

Results are not final. Last updated on 22 March at 12:35am ACDT.
