= Joe Rossi (politician) =

Australian politician (1948–2024)

Joseph Peter Rossi (22 May 1948 – 24 October 2024) was an Australian politician. He was the Liberal MP for the seat of Lee in the South Australian House of Assembly. He won the seat at the 1993 election before losing it at the 1997 election.

Rossi's election was unexpected as the seat is normally safe Labor, with Lee becoming the Liberal government's most marginal seat on a 1.1 percent margin. He held controversial views such as sterilising unmarried mothers after the third child, and introducing a modern version of poor houses for welfare recipients. At one stage Rossi was ejected from parliament for consuming a meat pie in the chamber.

Rossi ran as an independent in Lee at the 2010 election, receiving a vote of 2.2 percent (455 votes).
