= Michael Wright (Australian politician) =

Australian politician

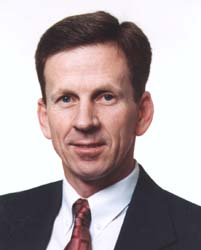
Michael Wright

Michael John Wright (born 3 May 1956) is an Australian politician. He was a Labor Party member of the South Australian House of Assembly seat of Lee from 1997 to 2014.

Wright has a Bachelor of Education, and held ministry positions in the Rann cabinet from 2002 to 2011.

Prior to entering parliament, Wright was involved with the Australian Workers' Union from the late 1980s until the mid-1990s. He is the son of former Deputy Premier of South Australia Jack Wright.

Wright did not recontest his seat at the 2014 election.

South Australian House of Assembly
Preceded by Joe Rossi	Member for Lee; 1997–2014	Succeeded by Stephen Mullighan
