= Candidates of the 1993 South Australian state election =

The 1993 South Australian state election was held on 11 December 1993.

== Defections, redistributions and seat changes ==
Hartley Labor MHA Terry Groom resigned from the party in 1991 after losing preselection to contest the seat of Napier at the 1993 election. Elizabeth Independent MHA Martyn Evans was admitted to the Labor Party and endorsed as a candidate in late 1993.

A redistribution was completed in 1991, incorporating changes to the Constitution instituted by referendum requiring the electoral map to be drawn with an eye to ensuring the seat result reflected the statewide vote. The Labor seats of Albert Park, Baudin, Briggs, Gilles, Henley Beach, Stuart, Todd, Walsh and Whyalla; the Liberal seats of Alexandra, Hayward, Mount Gambier, Mitcham, Murray-Mallee and Victoria; and the Independent-held seat of Semaphore were abolished. The redistribution created the notionally Labor seats of Elder, Giles, Hart, Kaurna, Lee, Reynell, Taylor, Torrens and Wright; and the notionally Liberal seats of Colton, Finniss, Frome, Gordon, MacKillop, Ridley and Waite. The Labor seat of Hartley became notionally Liberal, while the Liberal seats of Hanson and Newland became notionally Labor.

- Albert Park Labor MHA Kevin Hamilton contested Lee.
- Alexandra Liberal MHA Dean Brown contested Finniss.
- Briggs Labor MHA Mike Rann contested Ramsay.
- Hanson Liberal MHA Heini Becker contested Peake.
- Hartley Labor-turned-Independent MHA Terry Groom contested Napier.
- Hayward Liberal MHA Mark Brindal contested Unley.
- Henley Beach Labor MHA Don Ferguson contested the Legislative Council.
- Mawson Labor MHA Susan Lenehan contested Reynell.
- Mitcham Liberal MHA Stephen Baker contested Waite.
- Mitchell Labor MHA Paul Holloway contested Elder.
- Mount Gambier Liberal MHA Harold Allison contested Gordon.
- Murray-Mallee Liberal MHA Peter Lewis contested Ridley.
- Ramsay Labor MHA Lynn Arnold contested Taylor.
- Semaphore Independent MHA Norm Peterson contested the Legislative Council.
- Stuart Labor MHA Colleen Hutchison contested Eyre.
- Todd Labor MHA John Klunder contested Torrens.
- Victoria Liberal MHA Dale Baker contested MacKillop.
- Walsh Labor MHA John Trainer contested Hanson.
- Whyalla Labor MHA Frank Blevins contested Giles.
- Democrats MLC Mike Elliott contested Davenport. His fellow Democrats MLC, Ian Gilfillan, who was not up for re-election, resigned his seat to contest Norwood.

== Retiring Members ==
- Liberal MLC John Burdett died a few weeks before the election.

=== Labor ===
- John Bannon MHA (Ross Smith)
- Terry Hemmings MHA (Napier)
- Don Hopgood MHA (Baudin)
- Colin McKee MHA (Gilles)
- Gordon Bruce MLC

=== Liberal ===
- Peter Arnold MHA (Chaffey)
- Jennifer Cashmore MHA (Coles)
- Bruce Eastick MHA (Light)
- Stan Evans MHA (Davenport)
- Robert Ritson MLC

== House of Assembly ==
Sitting members are shown in bold text. Successful candidates are highlighted in the relevant colour. Where there is possible confusion, an asterisk (*) is also used.

Electorate	Held by	Labor candidate	Liberal candidate	Democrats candidate	Other candidates
Adelaide	Liberal	Clare Scriven	**Michael Armitage**	Mark Andrews	Peter Fenwick (NLP); Andrew Hall (DSP)
Bragg	Liberal	Paul Pilowsky	**Graham Ingerson**	Pam Kelly	Richard Barnes (NLP)
Bright	Liberal	Aileen Braun	**Wayne Matthew**	Fiona Blinco	
Chaffey	Liberal	Petar Zdravkovski	Kent Andrew	Eric Mack	Shirley Faulkner (Ind); Philip Lorimer (Ind); Peter McFarlane (Nat)
Coles	Liberal	Susan Dawe	Joan Hall	Lorelie Ball	Heather Lorenzon (NLP); Maria Lynch (Ind)
Colton	Liberal	Joe Ienco	Steve Condous	Fiona Dawkins	Kathleen Barrett (Ind); Andrew Hobbs (NLP); David Kingham (CTA); Bob Randall (Ind); Eustace Saltis (Ind)
Custance	Liberal	Ben Browne	**Ivan Venning**	Harm Folkers	Eugene Rooney (GP)
Davenport	Liberal	Anthony Kelly	Iain Evans	Mike Elliott	Mavis Casey (Ind); Frances Mowling (NLP)
Elder	Labor	**Paul Holloway**	David Wade	Don Knott	Reece Dobie (Ind); Terrence Leane (Ind); Dean Le Poidevin (Ind); Michael Nelson (Ind)
Elizabeth	Independent	**Martyn Evans**	Stephen Nicholson	Mark Basham	Alfred Charles (Ind)
Eyre	Liberal	**Colleen Hutchison**	**Graham Gunn**	Jack Babbage	Joy Baluch (Ind); Robert Court (Ind)
Finniss	Liberal	Leesa Chesser	**Dean Brown**	Richard McCarthy	Andrew Wells (NLP)
Fisher	Liberal	Warren Smith	**Bob Such**	Kathryn Warhurst	Armand Jung (NLP)
Flinders	National	Justin Jarvis	Liz Penfold	Elden Lawrie	**Peter Blacker** (Nat); Deidre Kent (CTA)
Florey	Labor	**Bob Gregory**	Sam Bass	Michael Pilling	Stan Batten (Ind)
Frome	Liberal	Allan Aughey	Rob Kerin	David Clarke	Vicki Reimer (NLP)
Giles	Labor	**Frank Blevins**	Terry Stephens	George Crowe	Keith Wilson (Ind)
Gordon	Liberal	Mark Johnson	**Harold Allison**	Regine Andersen	Bronte Whelan (Ind)
Goyder	Liberal	Charles Greeneklee	**John Meier**	Richard Kenny	
Hanson	Labor	**John Trainer**	Stewart Leggett	Pat Macaskill	Joan Herraman (Ind); Cherily Wilson (NLP)
Hart	Independent	Kevin Foley	Vincenzo Francesca	Peter Davies	Alison Douglas (NLP); Clive Ford (Ind); Roger Hayes (Ind); Brian Noone (Ind); Colin Shearing (Ind)
Hartley	Liberal	David Bamford	Joe Scalzi	Richard Greenwood	Anthony Coombe (NLP)
Heysen	Liberal	David Cornish	**David Wotton**	John Töns	Pamela Chipperfield (NLP); Mnem Giles (Grn)
Kaurna	Labor	John Hill	Lorraine Rosenberg	Dennis Dorney	Robert Campbell (Ind); Jack Holder (GP); Denise Leek (Ind); Susan Regione (Grn); John Watson (CTA)
Kavel	Liberal	Joseph Kane	**John Olsen**	Peter Brzycki	Lyndal Vincent (NLP); Graeme Watts (Ind)
Lee	Labor	**Kevin Hamilton**	Joe Rossi	Peter Clements	Alan Behn (CTA); Lynne Brown (NLP); Bernhard Cotton (Ind); Barbara Wasylenko (Ind)
Light	Liberal	Susan Simpson	Malcolm Buckby	Cathi Tucker-Lee	
MacKillop	Liberal	Gerard McEwen	**Dale Baker**	Angela Smith	Philip Cornish (CTA)
Mawson	Labor	Michael Wright	Robert Brokenshire	Lenore Turney	Peter Marshall (Ind); Cliff Payne (NLP); Christopher Thornton (Ind)
Mitchell	Labor	Paul Acfield	Colin Caudell	Elizabeth Williams	John Darbishire (GP); Andrew Scott (NLP); Vanessa Sutch (Ind)
Morphett	Liberal	Ron Williams	**John Oswald**	Michael Gell	Howard Martin (CTA); Andrew Reimer (NLP)
Napier	Labor	Annette Hurley	Murray Happ	Eugene Brislan	George Bell (GP); **Terry Groom** (Ind); Gaynor Smallwood-Smith (Ind); Jack Webb (Ind)
Newland	Labor	Lea Stevens	**Dorothy Kotz**	Kim Pedler	Terence Boswell (Ind)
Norwood	Labor	**Greg Crafter**	John Cummins	Ian Gilfillan	Vladimir Lorenzon (NLP)
Peake	Labor	**Vic Heron**	Heini Becker	David Lasscock	Timothy Brady (NLP); Kym Buckley (Ind); Michael Lamb (Grn); Harry Magias (Ind); Melanie Sjoberg (DSP)
Playford	Labor	**John Quirke**	Peter Panagaris	Colin Maas	John Cotton (Ind); Lionel Owen (Ind)
Price	Labor	**Murray De Laine**	Lawrence Liang	Alex Bowie	Emily Gilbey-Riley (GP)
Ramsay	Labor	**Mike Rann**	Phil Newton	Philip Newey	
Reynell	Labor	**Susan Lenehan**	Julie Greig	Gregory Renet	John Bentley (Ind)
Ridley	Liberal	Gary Orr	**Peter Lewis**	Merilyn Pedrick	
Ross Smith	Labor	Ralph Clarke	Steven Thomson	Matthew Mitchell	
Spence	Labor	**Michael Atkinson**	Danny McGuire	Jim Sotirianakos	Athena Yiossis (NLP)
Taylor	Labor	**Lynn Arnold**	Stephany Georgeff	Helen Munro	
Torrens	Labor	**John Klunder**	Joe Tiernan	Jennifer Whitehead	Aniello Carbone (Ind); Tom Curnow (CTA); Dianne Fenwick (NLP)
Unley	Labor	**Kym Mayes**	Mark Brindal	Chris Kennedy	Gavin McAuliffe (Ind); Joseph Soos (NLP)
Waite	Liberal	Geoffrey Phillips	**Stephen Baker**	Judith Barr	David Bidstrup (Ind); Anne Davidson (NLP); Neil Worrall (Ind)
Wright	Labor	Trish White	Scott Ashenden	Steve Bartholomew	Ronald Fox (Ind)

== Legislative Council ==
Sitting members are shown in bold text. Tickets that elected at least one MLC are highlighted in the relevant colour. Successful candidates are identified by an asterisk (*). Eleven seats were up for election. Labor were defending five seats. The Liberals were defending five seats. The Democrats were defending one seat.

Labor candidates	Liberal candidates	Democrats candidates	Nationals SA candidates	CTA candidates	NLP candidates
1. **Barbara Wiese***; 2. **Terry Roberts***; 3. **Carolyn Pickles***; 4. **Trevor Crothers***; 5. Don Ferguson; 6. Bill Hender	1. **Trevor Griffin***; 2. **Legh Davis***; 3. **Jamie Irwin***; 4. Caroline Schaefer*; 5. Robert Lawson*; 6. Angus Redford*; 7. Penny Reader Harris	1. Sandra Kanck*; 2. Judy Smith; 3. Graham Pamount; 4. Paul Black; 5. Matthew Rogers; 6. Patricia Tickle	1. Dick Jacka; 2. Terry Mullan	1. David Rodway; 2. David Squirrell	1. Gary Wood; 2. Anne Martin
Shooters candidates	Grey Power candidates	HEMP candidates	Green Party candidates	Green Alliance candidates	Ind. Alliance candidates
1. Jack King; 2. Rob Low	1. Bruce Harris; 2. Betty Preston	1. Jamnes Danenberg; 2. Dave Sag	1. Ally Fricker; 2. Tim Bickmore	1. Trish Corcoran; 2. Col Smith	1. David Dwyer; 2. Stephen Wikblom; 3. Douglas Giddings
IPOS candidates	Ungrouped candidates				
1. Helen Adams; 2. Michelle Butterworth	Clare McCarty; Clive Mobbs; Norm Peterson; Leo Smaniotto				
