= Results of the 1993 South Australian state election (House of Assembly) =

South Australian state election, 11 December 1993 House of Assembly << 1989–1997 >>
Enrolled voters	1,006,035				
Votes cast	941,301		Turnout	93.57	-0.86
Informal votes	29,206		Informal	3.10	+0.27
Summary of votes by party
Party	Primary votes	%	Swing	Seats	Change
Liberal	481,623	52.80	+8.60	37	+ 15
Labor	277,038	30.37	–9.72	10	– 12
Democrats	82,942	9.09	–1.18	0	± 0
National	10,157	1.11	–0.07	0	– 1
Natural Law	9,386	1.03	+1.03	0	± 0
Independent	28,498	3.12	+1.89	0	± 0
Independent Labor	6,225	0.68	–0.83	0	– 2
Other	16,226	1.78	*	0	± 0
Total	912,095			47	
Two-party-preferred
Liberal	555,534	60.91	+8.87		
Labor	356,561	39.09	–8.87		

This is a list of House of Assembly results for the 1993 South Australian state election.

== Results by electoral district ==
=== Adelaide ===
1993 South Australian state election: Adelaide
Party	Candidate	Votes	%	±%
Liberal	Michael Armitage	11,045	58.5	+11.9
Labor	Clare Scriven	5,043	26.7	−15.2
Democrats	Mark Andrews	1,741	9.2	−0.5
Natural Law	Peter Fenwick	606	3.2	+3.2
Democratic Socialist	Andrew Hall	458	2.4	+2.4
Total formal votes		18,893	97.3	−0.8
Informal votes		524	2.7	+0.8
Turnout		19,417	90.9	
Two-party-preferred result
Liberal	Michael Armitage	12,101	64.1	+12.8
Labor	Clare Scriven	6,792	35.9	−12.8
Liberal hold		Swing	+12.8	

=== Bragg ===
1993 South Australian state election: Bragg
Party	Candidate	Votes	%	±%
Liberal	Graham Ingerson	14,584	72.7	+11.2
Labor	Paul Pilowsky	3,127	15.6	−9.6
Democrats	Pam Kelly	1,844	9.2	−3.5
Natural Law	Richard Barnes	498	2.5	+2.5
Total formal votes		20,053	98.1	−0.1
Informal votes		398	1.9	+0.1
Turnout		20,451	92.7	
Two-party-preferred result
Liberal	Graham Ingerson	15,790	78.7	+11.3
Labor	Paul Pilowsky	4,263	21.3	−11.3
Liberal hold		Swing	+11.3	

=== Bright ===
1993 South Australian state election: Bright
Party	Candidate	Votes	%	±%
Liberal	Wayne Matthew	12,573	64.0	+18.0
Labor	Aileen Braun	4,711	24.0	−16.7
Democrats	Fiona Blinco	2,358	12.0	+1.1
Total formal votes		19,642	97.9	−0.4
Informal votes		424	2.1	+0.4
Turnout		20,066	95.0	
Two-party-preferred result
Liberal	Wayne Matthew	13,547	69.0	+16.6
Labor	Aileen Braun	6,095	31.0	−16.6
Liberal hold		Swing	+16.6	

=== Chaffey ===
1993 South Australian state election: Chaffey
Party	Candidate	Votes	%	±%
Liberal	Kent Andrew	8,109	41.1	−17.6
National	Peter McFarlane	4,668	23.7	+23.7
Independent	Philip Lorimer	4,464	22.6	+22.6
Labor	Petar Zdravkovski	1,678	8.5	−15.7
Independent	Shirley Faulkner	521	2.6	+2.6
Democrats	Eric Mack	282	1.4	−10.1
Total formal votes		19,722	96.7	−0.5
Informal votes		672	3.3	+0.5
Turnout		20,394	92.9	
Two-party-preferred result
Liberal	Kent Andrew	15,579	79.0	+8.3
Labor	Petar Zdravkovski	4,143	21.0	−8.3
Two-candidate-preferred result
Liberal	Kent Andrew	11,105	56.3	−14.4
National	Peter McFarlane	8,617	43.7	+43.7
Liberal hold		Swing	N/A	

=== Coles ===
1993 South Australian state election: Coles
Party	Candidate	Votes	%	±%
Liberal	Joan Hall	10,891	55.9	+7.8
Labor	Susan Dawe	4,985	25.6	−14.3
Democrats	Lorelie Ball	1,876	9.6	−1.5
Independent	Maria Lynch	1,315	6.8	+6.8
Natural Law	Heather Lorenzon	401	2.1	+2.1
Total formal votes		19,468	96.4	−0.2
Informal votes		732	3.6	+0.2
Turnout		20,200	94.5	
Two-party-preferred result
Liberal	Joan Hall	12,828	65.9	+11.7
Labor	Susan Dawe	6,640	34.1	−11.7
Liberal hold		Swing	+11.7	

=== Colton ===
1993 South Australian state election: Colton
Party	Candidate	Votes	%	±%
Liberal	Steve Condous	8,609	44.2	−2.1
Labor	Joe Ienco	4,836	24.8	−18.8
Independent	Bob Randall	3,990	20.5	+20.5
Democrats	Fiona Dawkins	1,060	5.4	−3.1
Independent	Kathleen Barrett	423	2.2	+2.2
Call to Australia	David Kingham	245	1.3	−0.4
Natural Law	Andrew Hobbs	179	0.9	+0.9
Independent	Eustace Saltis	140	0.7	+0.7
Total formal votes		19,482	95.9	−1.9
Informal votes		840	4.1	+1.9
Turnout		20,322	93.8	
Two-party-preferred result
Liberal	Steve Condous	11,787	60.5	+9.5
Labor	Joe Ienco	7,695	39.5	−9.5
Liberal hold		Swing	+9.5	

=== Custance ===
1993 South Australian state election: Custance
Party	Candidate	Votes	%	±%
Liberal	Ivan Venning	13,550	69.8	+9.5
Labor	Ben Browne	3,716	19.1	−5.8
Democrats	Harm Folkers	1,517	7.8	+0.6
Grey Power	Eugene Rooney	643	3.3	+3.3
Total formal votes		19,426	97.4	−0.2
Informal votes		509	2.6	+0.2
Turnout		19,935	93.8	
Two-party-preferred result
Liberal	Ivan Venning	14,477	74.5	+4.7
Labor	Ben Browne	4,949	25.5	−4.7
Liberal hold		Swing	+4.7	

=== Davenport ===
1993 South Australian state election: Davenport
Party	Candidate	Votes	%	±%
Liberal	Iain Evans	11,691	58.0	+4.1
Democrats	Mike Elliott	5,347	26.5	+9.5
Labor	Anthony Kelly	2,458	12.2	−15.2
Independent	Mavis Casey	401	2.0	+2.0
Natural Law	Frances Mowling	277	1.4	+1.4
Total formal votes		20,174	98.0	−0.3
Informal votes		412	2.0	+0.3
Turnout		20,586	94.2	
Two-party-preferred result
Liberal	Iain Evans	14,572	72.2	+9.4
Labor	Anthony Kelly	5,602	27.8	−9.4
Two-candidate-preferred result
Liberal	Iain Evans	12,144	60.2	−2.6
Democrats	Mike Elliott	8,030	39.8	+39.8
Liberal hold		Swing	N/A	

=== Elder ===
1993 South Australian state election: Elder
Party	Candidate	Votes	%	±%
Liberal	David Wade	9,098	48.0	+8.2
Labor	Paul Holloway	7,070	37.3	−11.2
Democrats	Don Knott	1,520	8.0	−3.4
Independent	Michael Nelson	547	2.9	+2.9
Independent	Terrence Leane	365	1.9	+1.9
Independent	Reece Dobie	193	1.0	+1.0
Independent	Dean Le Poidevin	142	0.7	+0.7
Total formal votes		18,935	95.3	−2.1
Informal votes		925	4.7	+2.1
Turnout		19,860	93.8	
Two-party-preferred result
Liberal	David Wade	10,113	53.4	+8.0
Labor	Paul Holloway	8,822	46.6	−8.0
Liberal gain from Labor		Swing	+8.0	

=== Elizabeth ===
1993 South Australian state election: Elizabeth
Party	Candidate	Votes	%	±%
Labor	Martyn Evans	8,392	47.0	+6.2
Liberal	Stephen Nicholson	5,392	30.2	+8.0
Independent	Alfred Charles	2,521	14.1	+14.1
Democrats	Mark Basham	1,546	8.7	−0.9
Total formal votes		17,851	96.4	+0.3
Informal votes		661	3.6	−0.3
Turnout		18,512	93.5	
Two-party-preferred result
Labor	Martyn Evans	10,280	57.6	−8.2
Liberal	Stephen Nicholson	7,571	42.4	+8.2
Labor gain from Independent		Swing	N/A	

=== Eyre ===
1993 South Australian state election: Eyre
Party	Candidate	Votes	%	±%
Liberal	Graham Gunn	8,040	44.9	+8.2
Labor	Colleen Hutchison	6,375	35.6	−2.6
Independent	Joy Baluch	2,594	14.5	−0.8
Democrats	Jack Babbage	643	3.6	−2.2
Independent	Robert Court	245	1.4	+1.4
Total formal votes		17,897	97.8	+1.0
Informal votes		399	2.2	−1.0
Turnout		18,296	86.8	
Two-party-preferred result
Liberal	Graham Gunn	10,106	56.5	+4.3
Labor	Colleen Hutchison	7,791	43.5	−4.3
Liberal hold		Swing	+4.3	

=== Finniss ===
1993 South Australian state election: Finniss
Party	Candidate	Votes	%	±%
Liberal	Dean Brown	13,527	69.2	+10.5
Labor	Leesa Chesser	3,269	16.7	−9.6
Democrats	Richard McCarthy	2,196	11.2	−3.7
Natural Law	Andrew Wells	557	2.8	+2.8
Total formal votes		19,549	97.7	−0.4
Informal votes		467	2.3	+0.4
Turnout		20,016	92.8	
Two-party-preferred result
Liberal	Dean Brown	14,548	74.4	+9.0
Labor	Leesa Chesser	5,001	25.6	−9.0
Liberal hold		Swing	+9.0	

=== Fisher ===
1993 South Australian state election: Fisher
Party	Candidate	Votes	%	±%
Liberal	Bob Such	12,892	64.3	+18.0
Labor	Warren Smith	4,471	22.3	−18.8
Democrats	Kathryn Warhurst	2,308	11.5	+2.3
Natural Law	Armand Jung	394	2.0	+2.0
Total formal votes		20,065	97.7	−0.4
Informal votes		475	2.3	+0.4
Turnout		20,540	94.8	
Two-party-preferred result
Liberal	Bob Such	14,191	70.7	+17.9
Labor	Warren Smith	5,874	29.3	−17.9
Liberal hold		Swing	+17.9	

=== Flinders ===
1993 South Australian state election: Flinders
Party	Candidate	Votes	%	±%
Liberal	Liz Penfold	10,353	54.0	+14.5
National	Peter Blacker	5,489	28.6	−13.0
Labor	Justin Jarvis	2,091	10.9	−3.1
Democrats	Elden Lawrie	931	4.9	0.0
Call to Australia	Deidre Kent	308	1.6	+1.6
Two-party-preferred result
Liberal	Liz Penfold	15,456	80.6	−4.9
Labor	Justin Jarvis	3,716	19.4	+4.9
Two-candidate-preferred result
Liberal	Liz Penfold	11,086	57.8	+14.6
National	Peter Blacker	8,086	42.2	−14.6
Liberal gain from National		Swing	+14.6	

=== Florey ===
1993 South Australian state election: Florey
Party	Candidate	Votes	%	±%
Liberal	Sam Bass	10,981	54.5	+14.6
Labor	Bob Gregory	6,522	32.4	−12.0
Democrats	Michael Pilling	2,122	10.5	−0.1
Independent	Stan Batten	527	2.6	+2.6
Total formal votes		20,152	97.1	+0.3
Informal votes		608	2.9	−0.3
Turnout		20,760	94.6	
Two-party-preferred result
Liberal	Sam Bass	12,164	60.4	+12.2
Labor	Bob Gregory	7,988	39.6	−12.2
Liberal gain from Labor		Swing	+12.2	

=== Frome ===
1993 South Australian state election: Frome
Party	Candidate	Votes	%	±%
Liberal	Rob Kerin	10,615	51.8	+10.2
Labor	Allan Aughey	8,239	40.2	+3.3
Democrats	David Clarke	1,112	5.4	−0.5
Natural Law	Vicki Reimer	519	2.5	+2.5
Total formal votes		20,485	97.9	+0.3
Informal votes		437	2.1	−0.3
Turnout		20,922	94.0	
Two-party-preferred result
Liberal	Rob Kerin	11,420	55.7	+1.3
Labor	Allan Aughey	9,065	44.3	−1.3
Liberal hold		Swing	+1.3	

=== Giles ===
1993 South Australian state election: Giles
Party	Candidate	Votes	%	±%
Labor	Frank Blevins	7,298	39.0	−7.0
Liberal	Terry Stephens	6,330	33.8	+4.1
Independent	Keith Wilson	2,925	15.6	+15.6
Democrats	George Crowe	2,164	11.6	+3.4
Total formal votes		18,717	97.7	+0.5
Informal votes		434	2.3	−0.5
Turnout		19,151	92.8	
Two-party-preferred result
Labor	Frank Blevins	9,816	52.4	−2.8
Liberal	Terry Stephens	8,901	47.6	+2.8
Labor hold		Swing	−2.8	

=== Gordon ===
1993 South Australian state election: Gordon
Party	Candidate	Votes	%	±%
Liberal	Harold Allison	13,401	69.0	+1.4
Labor	Mark Johnson	4,514	23.2	−0.7
Democrats	Regine Andersen	962	5.0	−1.0
Independent	Bronte Whelan	552	2.8	+2.8
Total formal votes		19,429	98.0	−0.2
Informal votes		396	2.0	+0.2
Turnout		19,825	94.6	
Two-party-preferred result
Liberal	Harold Allison	14,031	72.2	−0.3
Labor	Mark Johnson	5,398	27.8	+0.3
Liberal hold		Swing	−0.3	

=== Goyder ===
1993 South Australian state election: Goyder
Party	Candidate	Votes	%	±%
Liberal	John Meier	13,960	70.0	+6.2
Labor	Charles Greeneklee	4,483	22.5	−6.2
Democrats	Richard Kenny	1,492	7.5	+1.0
Total formal votes		19,935	98.0	−0.4
Informal votes		415	2.0	+0.4
Turnout		20,350	95.9	
Two-party-preferred result
Liberal	John Meier	14,606	73.3	+4.9
Labor	Charles Greeneklee	5,329	26.7	−4.9
Liberal hold		Swing	+4.9	

=== Hanson ===
1993 South Australian state election: Hanson
Party	Candidate	Votes	%	±%
Liberal	Stewart Leggett	9,086	46.3	+6.0
Labor	John Trainer	7,927	40.4	−8.4
Democrats	Pat Macaskill	1,504	7.7	−1.8
Independent	Joan Herraman	616	3.1	+3.1
Natural Law	Cherily Wilson	472	2.4	+2.4
Total formal votes		19,605	96.0	−0.1
Informal votes		821	4.0	+0.1
Turnout		20,426	92.3	
Two-party-preferred result
Liberal	Stewart Leggett	10,030	51.2	+6.1
Labor	John Trainer	9,575	48.8	−6.1
Liberal hold		Swing	+6.1	

- Hanson was made a notionally Labor held seat at the redistribution.

=== Hart ===
1993 South Australian state election: Hart
Party	Candidate	Votes	%	±%
Labor	Kevin Foley	7,506	40.9	+7.2
Liberal	Vincenzo Francesca	5,701	31.1	+10.8
Independent	Brian Noone	1,236	6.7	+6.7
Democrats	Peter Davies	1,155	6.3	+0.2
Independent	Clive Ford	876	4.8	+4.8
Independent	Roger Hayes	833	4.5	+4.5
Independent	Colin Shearing	780	4.3	+4.3
Natural Law	Alison Douglas	264	1.4	+1.4
Total formal votes		18,351	94.7	−2.6
Informal votes		1,017	5.3	+2.6
Turnout		19,368	93.7	
Two-party-preferred result
Labor	Kevin Foley	10,744	58.5	−13.7
Liberal	Vincenzo Francesca	7,607	41.5	+13.7
Labor gain from Independent		Swing	N/A	

- Hart is the new name of the abolished district of Semaphore, which was held by Independent Labor MP Norm Peterson, who contested the Legislative Council.

=== Hartley ===
1993 South Australian state election: Hartley
Party	Candidate	Votes	%	±%
Liberal	Joe Scalzi	11,338	57.7	+11.4
Labor	David Bamford	5,955	30.3	−11.9
Democrats	Richard Greenwood	1,647	8.4	−3.0
Natural Law	Anthony Coombe	713	3.6	+3.6
Total formal votes		19,653	96.6	0.0
Informal votes		691	3.4	0.0
Turnout		20,344	93.3	
Two-party-preferred result
Liberal	Joe Scalzi	12,416	63.2	+11.8
Labor	David Bamford	7,237	36.8	−11.8
Liberal gain from Labor		Swing	+11.8	

- Hartley became a notional Liberal seat in the redistribution.

=== Heysen ===
1993 South Australian state election: Heysen
Party	Candidate	Votes	%	±%
Liberal	David Wotton	12,753	65.6	+10.8
Labor	David Cornish	3,003	15.5	−10.8
Democrats	John Töns	2,199	11.3	−6.7
Greens	Mnem Giles	1,092	5.6	+5.6
Natural Law	Pamela Chipperfield	384	2.0	+2.0
Total formal votes		19,431	98.2	−0.7
Informal votes		364	1.8	+0.7
Turnout		19,795	93.7	
Two-party-preferred result
Liberal	David Wotton	14,475	74.5	+10.5
Labor	David Cornish	4,956	25.5	−10.5
Liberal hold		Swing	+10.5	

=== Kaurna ===
1993 South Australian state election: Kaurna
Party	Candidate	Votes	%	±%
Liberal	Lorraine Rosenberg	8,230	45.1	+7.5
Labor	John Hill	6,693	36.7	−9.9
Democrats	Dennis Dorney	1,060	5.8	−6.8
Greens	Susan Regione	879	4.8	+4.8
Grey Power	Jack Holder	496	2.7	+2.7
Call to Australia	John Watson	407	2.2	+1.9
Independent	Denise Leek	311	1.7	+1.7
Independent	Robert Campbell	157	0.9	+0.9
Total formal votes		18,233	95.9	−0.8
Informal votes		777	4.1	+0.8
Turnout		19,010	94.0	
Two-party-preferred result
Liberal	Lorraine Rosenberg	9,625	52.8	+6.4
Labor	John Hill	8,608	47.2	−6.4
Liberal gain from Labor		Swing	+6.4	

=== Kavel ===
1993 South Australian state election: Kavel
Party	Candidate	Votes	%	±%
Liberal	John Olsen	12,521	66.3	+8.3
Labor	Joseph Kane	3,360	17.8	−7.2
Democrats	Peter Brzycki	1,954	10.4	−3.0
Independent	Graeme Watts	622	3.3	+3.3
Natural Law	Lyndal Vincent	421	2.2	+2.2
Total formal votes		18,878	97.4	0.0
Informal votes		510	2.6	0.0
Turnout		19,388	93.8	
Two-party-preferred result
Liberal	John Olsen	14,019	74.3	+7.4
Labor	Joseph Kane	4,859	25.7	−7.4
Liberal hold		Swing	+7.4	

=== Lee ===
1993 South Australian state election: Lee
Party	Candidate	Votes	%	±%
Liberal	Joe Rossi	9,138	47.3	+8.9
Labor	Kevin Hamilton	8,129	42.1	−11.7
Democrats	Peter Clements	890	4.6	−3.1
Independent	Barbara Wasylenko	547	2.8	+2.8
Natural Law	Lynne Brown	239	1.2	+1.2
Independent	Bernhard Cotton	223	1.2	+1.2
Call to Australia	Alan Behn	137	0.7	+0.7
Total formal votes		19,303	95.0	−2.3
Informal votes		1,025	5.0	+2.3
Turnout		20,328	94.1	
Two-party-preferred result
Liberal	Joe Rossi	9,864	51.1	+9.2
Labor	Kevin Hamilton	9,439	48.9	−9.2
Liberal gain from Labor		Swing	+9.2	

=== Light ===
1993 South Australian state election: Light
Party	Candidate	Votes	%	±%
Liberal	Malcolm Buckby	11,482	61.4	+9.0
Labor	Susan Simpson	4,877	26.1	−8.3
Democrats	Cathi Tucker-Lee	2,339	12.5	+4.1
Total formal votes		18,698	97.3	+0.3
Informal votes		526	2.7	−0.3
Turnout		19,224	93.7	
Two-party-preferred result
Liberal	Malcolm Buckby	12,415	66.4	+5.8
Labor	Susan Simpson	6,283	33.6	−5.8
Liberal hold		Swing	+5.8	

=== MacKillop ===
1993 South Australian state election: MacKillop
Party	Candidate	Votes	%	±%
Liberal	Dale Baker	14,133	69.0	0.0
Labor	Gerard McEwen	3,745	18.3	−4.8
Democrats	Angela Smith	1,382	6.8	−0.8
Call to Australia	Philip Cornish	1,211	5.9	+5.9
Total formal votes		20,471	98.2	0.0
Informal votes		369	1.8	0.0
Turnout		20,840	95.2	
Two-party-preferred result
Liberal	Dale Baker	15,903	77.7	+4.0
Labor	Gerard McEwen	4,568	22.3	−4.0
Liberal hold		Swing	+4.0	

=== Mawson ===
1993 South Australian state election: Mawson
Party	Candidate	Votes	%	±%
Liberal	Robert Brokenshire	11,208	52.5	+11.2
Labor	Michael Wright	6,634	31.1	−13.9
Democrats	Lenore Turney	1,420	6.7	−6.7
Independent	Peter Marshall	1,342	6.3	+6.3
Independent	Christopher Thornton	403	1.9	+1.9
Natural Law	Cliff Payne	333	1.6	+1.6
Total formal votes		21,340	96.7	−0.7
Informal votes		720	3.3	+0.7
Turnout		22,060	94.9	
Two-party-preferred result
Liberal	Robert Brokenshire	12,718	59.6	+12.2
Labor	Michael Wright	8,622	40.4	−12.2
Liberal gain from Labor		Swing	+12.2	

=== Mitchell ===
1993 South Australian state election: Mitchell
Party	Candidate	Votes	%	±%
Liberal	Colin Caudell	9,905	51.8	+12.4
Labor	Paul Acfield	6,207	32.4	−14.5
Democrats	Elizabeth Williams	1,793	9.4	−1.3
Grey Power	John Darbishire	599	3.1	+3.1
Independent	Vanessa Sutch	337	1.8	+1.8
Natural Law	Andrew Scott	296	1.5	+1.5
Total formal votes		19,137	96.5	−0.5
Informal votes		691	3.5	+0.5
Turnout		19,828	94.5	
Two-party-preferred result
Liberal	Colin Caudell	11,365	59.4	+13.0
Labor	Paul Acfield	7,772	40.6	−13.0
Liberal gain from Labor		Swing	+13.0	

=== Morphett ===
1993 South Australian state election: Morphett
Party	Candidate	Votes	%	±%
Liberal	John Oswald	12,523	65.3	+11.2
Labor	Ron Williams	4,497	23.5	−12.0
Democrats	Michael Gell	1,405	7.3	−2.7
Natural Law	Andrew Reimer	424	2.2	+2.2
Call to Australia	Howard Martin	326	1.7	+1.5
Total formal votes		19,175	97.3	−0.9
Informal votes		539	2.7	+0.9
Turnout		19,714	92.4	
Two-party-preferred result
Liberal	John Oswald	13,781	71.9	+12.7
Labor	Ron Williams	5,394	28.1	−12.7
Liberal hold		Swing	+12.7	

=== Napier ===
1993 South Australian state election: Napier
Party	Candidate	Votes	%	±%
Liberal	Murray Happ	7,381	38.0	+7.9
Labor	Annette Hurley	6,110	31.4	−17.9
Independent	Terry Groom	2,620	13.5	+13.5
Democrats	Eugene Brislan	1,175	6.0	−6.4
Independent	Jack Webb	939	4.8	+4.8
Grey Power	George Bell	743	3.8	+3.8
Independent	Gaynor Smallwood-Smith	463	2.4	+2.4
Total formal votes		19,431	95.0	−1.3
Informal votes		1,017	5.0	+1.3
Turnout		20,448	93.8	
Two-party-preferred result
Labor	Annette Hurley	9,926	51.1	−10.4
Liberal	Murray Happ	9,505	48.9	+10.4
Labor hold		Swing	−10.4	

=== Newland ===
1993 South Australian state election: Newland
Party	Candidate	Votes	%	±%
Liberal	Dorothy Kotz	12,256	61.3	+18.6
Labor	Lea Stevens	5,041	25.2	−19.6
Democrats	Kim Pedler	2,030	10.2	+1.9
Independent	Terence Boswell	658	3.3	+3.3
Total formal votes		19,985	97.4	−0.5
Informal votes		525	2.6	+0.5
Turnout		20,510	94.9	
Two-party-preferred result
Liberal	Dorothy Kotz	13,467	67.4	+17.8
Labor	Lea Stevens	6,518	32.6	−17.8
Liberal hold		Swing	+17.8	

- Newland was a notionally Labor held seat at the redistribution.

=== Norwood ===
1993 South Australian state election: Norwood
Party	Candidate	Votes	%	±%
Liberal	John Cummins	9,669	51.1	+9.7
Labor	Greg Crafter	6,412	33.9	−10.8
Democrats	Ian Gilfillan	2,337	12.4	+0.3
Natural Law	Vladimir Lorenzon	493	2.6	+2.6
Total formal votes		18,911	97.0	0.0
Informal votes		576	3.0	0.0
Turnout		19,487	91.7	
Two-party-preferred result
Liberal	John Cummins	10,848	57.4	+10.4
Labor	Greg Crafter	8,063	42.6	−10.4
Liberal gain from Labor		Swing	+10.4	

=== Peake ===
1993 South Australian state election: Peake
Party	Candidate	Votes	%	±%
Liberal	Heini Becker	9,005	47.2	+6.6
Labor	Vic Heron	5,818	30.5	−17.0
Independent	Kym Buckley	2,074	10.9	+10.9
Democrats	David Lasscock	686	3.6	−5.4
Greens	Michael Lamb	550	2.9	+2.9
Independent	Harry Magias	358	1.9	+1.9
Natural Law	Timothy Brady	348	1.8	+1.8
Democratic Socialist	Melanie Sjoberg	242	1.3	−0.1
Total formal votes		19,081	95.4	+0.1
Informal votes		923	4.6	−0.1
Turnout		20,004	93.8	
Two-party-preferred result
Liberal	Heini Becker	10,613	55.6	+9.6
Labor	Vic Heron	8,468	44.4	−9.6
Liberal gain from Labor		Swing	+9.6	

=== Playford ===
1993 South Australian state election: Playford
Party	Candidate	Votes	%	±%
Labor	John Quirke	8,329	43.7	−8.6
Liberal	Peter Panagaris	7,865	41.3	+9.0
Democrats	Colin Maas	1,521	7.0	−7.1
Independent	Lionel Owen	685	3.6	+3.6
Independent	John Cotton	648	3.4	+3.4
Total formal votes		19,048	96.5	+0.3
Informal votes		683	3.5	−0.3
Turnout		19,731	94.9	
Two-party-preferred result
Labor	John Quirke	10,036	52.7	−7.1
Liberal	Peter Panagaris	9,012	47.3	+7.1
Labor hold		Swing	−7.1	

=== Price ===
1993 South Australian state election: Price
Party	Candidate	Votes	%	±%
Labor	Murray De Laine	10,098	52.7	−7.2
Liberal	Lawrence Liang	6,308	32.9	+2.9
Democrats	Alex Bowie	1,546	8.1	−1.4
Grey Power	Emily Gilbey-Riley	1,226	6.4	+6.4
Total formal votes		19,178	95.8	+0.5
Informal votes		832	4.2	−0.5
Turnout		20,010	92.8	
Two-party-preferred result
Labor	Murray De Laine	11,700	61.0	−4.9
Liberal	Lawrence Liang	7,478	39.0	+4.9
Labor hold		Swing	−4.9	

=== Ramsay ===
1993 South Australian state election: Ramsay
Party	Candidate	Votes	%	±%
Labor	Mike Rann	10,800	54.1	−2.5
Liberal	Phil Newton	7,055	35.3	+4.7
Democrats	Philip Newey	2,110	10.6	−1.1
Total formal votes		19,965	96.6	+0.5
Informal votes		699	3.4	−0.5
Turnout		20,664	93.9	
Two-party-preferred result
Labor	Mike Rann	11,966	59.9	−3.8
Liberal	Phil Newton	7,999	40.1	+3.8
Labor hold		Swing	−3.8	

=== Reynell ===
1993 South Australian state election: Reynell
Party	Candidate	Votes	%	±%
Liberal	Julie Greig	8,575	46.0	+11.7
Labor	Susan Lenehan	7,362	39.5	−12.4
Democrats	Gregory Renet	1,966	10.5	−1.7
Independent	John Bentley	745	4.0	+4.0
Total formal votes		18,648	97.1	+0.6
Informal votes		559	2.9	−0.6
Turnout		19,207	93.9	
Two-party-preferred result
Liberal	Julie Greig	9,549	51.2	+10.2
Labor	Susan Lenehan	9,099	48.8	−10.2
Liberal gain from Labor		Swing	+10.2	

=== Ridley ===
1993 South Australian state election: Ridley
Party	Candidate	Votes	%	±%
Liberal	Peter Lewis	13,955	70.9	+9.1
Labor	Gary Orr	3,960	20.1	−4.5
Democrats	Merilyn Pedrick	1,778	9.0	−0.5
Total formal votes		19,693	97.5	+0.4
Informal votes		506	2.5	−0.4
Turnout		20,199	94.8	
Two-party-preferred result
Liberal	Peter Lewis	14,789	75.1	+4.4
Labor	Gary Orr	4,904	24.9	−4.4
Liberal hold		Swing	+4.4	

=== Ross Smith ===
1993 South Australian state election: Ross Smith
Party	Candidate	Votes	%	±%
Liberal	Steven Thomson	7,850	41.9	+9.7
Labor	Ralph Clarke	7,786	41.6	−16.2
Democrats	Matthew Mitchell	3,087	16.5	+6.5
Total formal votes		18,723	96.2	−0.4
Informal votes		740	3.8	+0.4
Turnout		19,463	92.9	
Two-party-preferred result
Labor	Ralph Clarke	9,761	52.1	−10.9
Liberal	Steven Thomson	8,962	47.9	+10.9
Labor hold		Swing	−10.9	

=== Spence ===
1993 South Australian state election: Spence
Party	Candidate	Votes	%	±%
Labor	Michael Atkinson	9,542	50.0	−5.7
Liberal	Danny McGuire	7,411	38.8	+12.0
Democrats	Jim Sotirianakos	1,483	7.8	+0.1
Natural Law	Athena Yiossis	649	3.4	+3.4
Total formal votes		19,085	96.1	+2.0
Informal votes		784	3.9	−2.0
Turnout		19,869	92.9	
Two-party-preferred result
Labor	Michael Atkinson	11,016	57.7	−6.4
Liberal	Danny McGuire	8,069	42.3	+6.4
Labor hold		Swing	−6.4	

=== Taylor ===
1993 South Australian state election: Taylor
Party	Candidate	Votes	%	±%
Labor	Lynn Arnold	9,501	51.1	−7.2
Liberal	Stephany Georgeff	6,813	36.6	+5.8
Democrats	Helen Munro	2,293	12.3	+1.3
Total formal votes		18,607	96.5	+1.1
Informal votes		682	3.5	−1.1
Turnout		19,289	92.9	
Two-party-preferred result
Labor	Lynn Arnold	10,784	58.0	−6.1
Liberal	Stephany Georgeff	7,823	42.0	+6.1
Labor hold		Swing	−6.1	

=== Torrens ===
1993 South Australian state election: Torrens
Party	Candidate	Votes	%	±%
Liberal	Joe Tiernan	9,368	48.4	+9.7
Labor	John Klunder	6,868	35.5	−12.2
Democrats	Jennifer Whitehead	1,873	9.7	−2.4
Call to Australia	Tom Curnow	505	2.6	+1.2
Natural Law	Dianne Fenwick	376	1.9	+1.9
Independent	Aniello Carbone	365	1.9	+1.9
Total formal votes		19,355	95.9	−1.1
Informal votes		832	4.1	+1.1
Turnout		20,187	94.2	
Two-party-preferred result
Liberal	Joe Tiernan	10,943	56.5	+11.0
Labor	John Klunder	8,412	43.5	−11.0
Liberal gain from Labor		Swing	+11.0	

=== Unley ===
1993 South Australian state election: Unley
Party	Candidate	Votes	%	±%
Liberal	Mark Brindal	11,321	56.7	+13.3
Labor	Kym Mayes	6,107	30.6	−11.9
Democrats	Chris Kennedy	1,981	9.9	−0.4
Natural Law	Joseph Soos	334	1.7	+1.7
Independent	Gavin McAuliffe	230	1.2	+1.2
Total formal votes		19,973	97.3	−0.1
Informal votes		545	2.7	+0.1
Turnout		20,518	91.6	
Two-party-preferred result
Liberal	Mark Brindal	12,293	61.5	+12.1
Labor	Kym Mayes	7,680	38.5	−12.1
Liberal gain from Labor		Swing	+12.1	

=== Waite ===
1993 South Australian state election: Waite
Party	Candidate	Votes	%	±%
Liberal	Stephen Baker	12,622	63.1	+6.3
Democrats	Judith Barr	3,632	18.2	+4.6
Labor	Geoffrey Phillips	3,195	16.0	−13.5
Natural Law	Anne Davidson	209	1.0	+1.0
Independent	David Bidstrup	205	1.0	+1.0
Independent	Neil Worrall	132	0.7	+0.7
Total formal votes		19,995	97.1	−1.0
Informal votes		595	2.9	+1.0
Turnout		20,590	92.4	
Two-party-preferred result
Liberal	Stephen Baker	14,777	73.9	+11.0
Labor	Geoffrey Phillips	5,218	26.1	−11.0
Two-candidate-preferred result
Liberal	Stephen Baker	14,654	73.3	+10.4
Democrats	Judith Barr	5,341	26.7	+26.7
Liberal hold		Swing	N/A	

=== Wright ===
1993 South Australian state election: Wright
Party	Candidate	Votes	%	±%
Liberal	Scott Ashenden	10,510	49.8	+11.7
Labor	Trish White	8,298	39.3	−9.6
Democrats	Steve Bartholomew	1,675	7.9	−2.0
Independent	Ronald Fox	612	2.9	+2.9
Total formal votes		21,095	97.4	−0.3
Informal votes		556	2.6	+0.3
Turnout		21,651	95.0	
Two-party-preferred result
Liberal	Scott Ashenden	11,401	54.0	+9.2
Labor	Trish White	9,694	46.0	−9.2
Liberal gain from Labor		Swing	+9.2	

== See also ==
- Members of the South Australian House of Assembly, 1993–1997
