= Results of the 1993 South Australian state election (Legislative Council) =

South Australian state election, 11 December 1993 Legislative Council << 1989–1997 >>
Enrolled voters	1,006,035				
Votes cast	941,864		Turnout	93.62	–0.91
Informal votes	33,338		Informal	3.54	–0.35
Summary of votes by party
Party	Primary votes	%	Swing	Seats won	Seats held
Liberal	470,675	51.81	+10.71	6	11
Labor	248,970	27.40	–12.35	4	9
Democrats	73,051	8.04	–2.65	1	2
HEMP	16,353	1.80	+1.80	0	0
Grey Power	14,560	1.60	–0.68	0	0
Greens	11,853	1.30	+1.30	0	0
Shooters	10,622	1.17	+1.17	0	0
Call to Australia	9,317	1.03	–1.50	0	0
National	6,516	0.72	–0.06	0	0
Green Alliance	3,960	0.44	+0.44	0	0
Independent Alliance	3,533	0.39	+0.39	0	0
Natural Law	3,421	0.38	+0.38	0	0
Other	35,695	3.93	*	0	0
Total	908,526			11	22

This is a list of results for the Legislative Council at the 1993 South Australian state election.

== Continuing members ==
The following MLCs were not up for re-election this year.

Member	Party	Term
Peter Dunn	Liberal	1989–1997
Diana Laidlaw	Liberal	1989–1997
Rob Lucas	Liberal	1989–1997
Julian Stefani	Liberal	1989–1997
Bernice Pfitzner	Liberal	1990–1997
Mario Feleppa	Labor	1989–1997
Anne Levy	Labor	1989–1997
Ron Roberts	Labor	1989–1997
Chris Sumner	Labor	1989–1997
George Weatherill	Labor	1989–1997
Ian Gilfillan	Democrats	1989–1997

== Election results ==
1993 South Australian state election: Legislative Council
Party	Candidate	Votes	%	±%
Quota		75,711		
Liberal	1. Trevor Griffin (elected 1); 2. Legh Davis (elected 3); 3. Jamie Irwin (elected 5); 4. Caroline Schaefer (elected 7); 5. Robert Lawson (elected 8); 6. Angus Redford (elected 9); 7. Penny Harris	470,675	51.81	+10.71
Labor	1. Barbara Wiese (elected 2); 2. Terry Roberts (elected 4); 3. Carolyn Pickles (elected 6); 4. Trevor Crothers (elected 11); 5. Don Ferguson; 6. Bill Hender	248,970	27.40	−12.35
Democrats	1. Sandra Kanck (elected 10); 2. Judy Smith; 3. Graham Pamount; 4. Paul Black; 5. Matthew Rogers; 6. Patricia Tickie	73,051	8.04	−2.65
Independent	Clare McCarty	18,521	2.04	+2.04
HEMP	1. Jamnes Danenberg; 2. Dave Sag	16,353	1.80	+1.80
Grey Power	1. Bruce Harris; 2. Betty Preston	14,560	1.60	−0.68
Greens	1. Ally Fricker; 2. Tim Bickmore	11,853	1.30	+1.30
Shooters	1. Jack King; 2. Rob Low	10,622	1.17	+1.17
Independent	Norm Peterson	10,338	1.14	+1.14
Call to Australia	1. David Rodway; 2. David Squirrell	9,317	1.03	−1.50
National	1. Dick Jacka; 2. Terry Mullan	6,516	0.72	−0.06
Green Alliance	1. Trish Corcoran; 2. Col Smith	3,960	0.44	+0.44
Independent Alliance	1. David Dwyer; 2. Stephen Wikblom; 3. Douglas Giddings	3,533	0.39	+0.39
Natural Law	1. Gary Wood; 2. Anne Martin	3,421	0.38	+0.38
Protect Our Schools	1. Helen Adams; 2. Michelle Butterworth	3,377	0.37	+0.37
Independent	Clive Mobbs	2,564	0.28	+0.28
Independent	Leo Smaniotto	895	0.10	+0.10
Total formal votes		908,526	96.46	+0.35
Informal votes		33,338	3.54	−0.35
Turnout		941,864	93.62	−0.91

== See also ==
- 1993 South Australian state election
- Candidates of the 1993 South Australian state election
- Members of the South Australian Legislative Council, 1993–1997
