= Members of the South Australian House of Assembly, 1993–1997 =

This is a list of members of the South Australian House of Assembly from 1993 to 1997, as elected at the 1993 state election:

Name	Party	Electorate	Term of office
Harold Allison	Liberal	Gordon	1975–1997
Kent Andrew	Liberal	Chaffey	1993–1997
Hon Dr Michael Armitage	Liberal	Adelaide	1989–2002
Hon Dr Lynn Arnold ^{[3]}	Labor	Taylor	1979–1994
Scott Ashenden	Liberal	Wright	1979–1985, 1993–1997
Michael Atkinson	Labor	Spence	1989–2018
Dale Baker	Liberal	MacKillop	1985–1997
Hon Stephen Baker	Liberal	Waite	1982–1997
Sam Bass	Liberal	Florey	1993–1997
Heini Becker	Liberal	Peake	1970–1997
Hon Frank Blevins	Labor	Giles	1985–1997
Mark Brindal	Liberal	Unley	1989–2006
Robert Brokenshire	Liberal	Mawson	1993–2006
Hon Dean Brown	Liberal	Finniss	1973–1985, 1992–2006
Malcolm Buckby	Liberal	Light	1993–2006
Colin Caudell	Liberal	Mitchell	1993–1997
Ralph Clarke	Labor	Ross Smith	1993–2002
Steve Condous	Liberal	Colton	1993–2002
John Cummins	Liberal	Norwood	1993–1997
Murray De Laine	Labor	Price	1985–2002
Iain Evans	Liberal	Davenport	1993–2014
Martyn Evans ^{[1]}	Labor	Elizabeth	1984–1994
Kevin Foley	Labor	Hart	1993–2011
Robyn Geraghty ^{[2]}	Labor	Torrens	1994–2014
Julie Greig	Liberal	Reynell	1993–1997
Hon Graham Gunn	Liberal	Eyre	1970–2010
Joan Hall	Liberal	Coles	1993–2006
Annette Hurley	Labor	Napier	1993–2002
Hon Graham Ingerson	Liberal	Bragg	1983–2002
Hon Rob Kerin	Liberal	Frome	1993–2008
Dorothy Kotz	Liberal	Newland	1989–2006
Peter Lewis	Liberal	Ridley	1979–2006
Stewart Leggett	Liberal	Hanson	1993–1997
Hon Wayne Matthew	Liberal	Bright	1989–2006
John Meier	Liberal	Goyder	1982–2006
Hon John Olsen	Liberal	Kavel	1979–1990, 1992–2002
Hon John Oswald	Liberal	Morphett	1979–2002
Liz Penfold	Liberal	Flinders	1993–2010
John Quirke	Labor	Playford	1989–1997
Hon Mike Rann	Labor	Ramsay	1985–2012
Lorraine Rosenberg	Liberal	Kaurna	1993–1997
Joe Rossi	Liberal	Lee	1993–1997
Joe Scalzi	Liberal	Hartley	1993–2006
Lea Stevens ^{[1]}	Labor	Elizabeth	1994–2010
Bob Such	Liberal	Fisher	1989–2014
Joe Tiernan ^{[2]}	Liberal	Torrens	1993–1994
Ivan Venning	Liberal	Custance	1990–2014
David Wade	Liberal	Elder	1993–1997
Trish White ^{[3]}	Labor	Taylor	1994–2010
Hon David Wotton	Liberal	Heysen	1975–2002

^{1} The Labor member for Elizabeth, Martyn Evans, resigned in early 1994 to contest a by-election for the federal seat of Bonython. Labor candidate Lea Stevens won the resulting by-election on 9 April 1994.
^{2} The Liberal member for Torrens, Joe Tiernan, died on 31 March 1994. Labor candidate Robyn Geraghty won the resulting by-election on 7 May 1994.
^{3} The Labor member for Taylor and former Premier of South Australia, Lynn Arnold, resigned in late 1994. Labor candidate Trish White won the resulting by-election on 5 November 1994.
