= Electoral results for the district of Napier =

South Australian district election results

This is a list of electoral results for the Electoral district of Napier in South Australian state elections.

== Members for Napier ==
| Member | Party | Term |
|---|---|---|
| Terry Hemmings | Labor Party | 1977–1993 |
| Annette Hurley | Labor Party | 1993–2002 |
| Michael O'Brien | Labor Party | 2002–2014 |
| Jon Gee | Labor Party | 2014–2018 |

== Election results ==
=== Elections in the 2010s ===
2014 South Australian state election: Napier
| Party | Candidate | Votes | % | ±% |
|---|---|---|---|---|
| Labor | Jon Gee | 9,689 | 47.6 | −7.2 |
| Liberal | Robert Leggatt | 6,206 | 30.5 | +4.0 |
| Family First | Gary Balfort | 2,741 | 13.5 | +3.7 |
| Greens | Sam Miles | 1,722 | 8.5 | +2.9 |
| Total formal votes | | 20,358 | 95.7 | −0.0 |
| Informal votes | | 906 | 4.3 | +0.0 |
| Turnout | | 21,264 | 89.9 | −1.4 |
Two-party-preferred result
| Labor | Jon Gee | 12,024 | 59.1 | −7.1 |
| Liberal | Robert Leggatt | 8,334 | 40.9 | +7.1 |
| Labor hold | | Swing | −7.1 | |

2010 South Australian state election: Napier
| Party | Candidate | Votes | % | ±% |
|---|---|---|---|---|
| Labor | Michael O'Brien | 11,176 | 53.9 | −7.1 |
| Liberal | Brenton Chomel | 5,497 | 26.5 | +7.4 |
| Family First | Gary Balfort | 2,162 | 10.4 | −0.2 |
| Greens | Louise Rodbourn | 1,257 | 6.1 | +0.4 |
| Independent | Wayne Rich | 661 | 3.2 | +3.2 |
| Total formal votes | | 20,753 | 95.3 | |
| Informal votes | | 916 | 4.7 | |
| Turnout | | 21,669 | 91.3 | |
Two-party-preferred result
| Labor | Michael O'Brien | 13,646 | 65.8 | −8.2 |
| Liberal | Brenton Chomel | 7,107 | 34.2 | +8.2 |
| Labor hold | | Swing | −8.2 | |

=== Elections in the 2000s ===
2006 South Australian state election: Napier
| Party | Candidate | Votes | % | ±% |
|---|---|---|---|---|
| Labor | Michael O'Brien | 12,066 | 61.1 | +9.2 |
| Liberal | Joe Federico | 3,718 | 18.8 | −9.5 |
| Family First | Peter Barnes | 2,122 | 10.7 | +10.7 |
| Greens | Terry Allen | 1,114 | 5.6 | +5.6 |
| Democrats | Scharyn Varley | 736 | 3.7 | −4.9 |
| Total formal votes | | 19,756 | 95.4 | |
| Informal votes | | 918 | 4.6 | |
| Turnout | | 20,675 | 91.3 | |
Two-party-preferred result
| Labor | Michael O'Brien | 14,681 | 74.3 | +10.0 |
| Liberal | Joe Federico | 5,075 | 25.7 | −10.0 |
| Labor hold | | Swing | +10.0 | |

2002 South Australian state election: Napier
| Party | Candidate | Votes | % | ±% |
|---|---|---|---|---|
| Labor | Michael O'Brien | 10,328 | 51.9 | −3.2 |
| Liberal | Joe Federico | 5,623 | 28.3 | +5.9 |
| Democrats | Simon Pointer | 1,710 | 8.6 | −13.8 |
| SA First | Tanya Adam | 1,300 | 6.5 | +6.5 |
| One Nation | Michael Pointer | 933 | 4.7 | +4.7 |
| Total formal votes | | 19,894 | 96.4 | |
| Informal votes | | 741 | 3.6 | |
| Turnout | | 20,635 | 93.4 | |
Two-party-preferred result
| Labor | Michael O'Brien | 12,786 | 64.3 | +4.8 |
| Liberal | Joe Federico | 7,108 | 35.7 | +35.7 |
| Labor hold | | Swing | N/A | |

=== Elections in the 1990s ===
1997 South Australian state election: Napier
| Party | Candidate | Votes | % | ±% |
|---|---|---|---|---|
| Labor | Annette Hurley | 10,031 | 56.1 | +17.5 |
| Democrats | Don Knott | 4,055 | 22.7 | +15.5 |
| Liberal | Rena Zurawel | 3,798 | 21.2 | −10.2 |
| Total formal votes | | 17,884 | 95.4 | +0.1 |
| Informal votes | | 853 | 4.6 | −0.1 |
| Turnout | | 18,737 | 92.0 | |
Two-party-preferred result
| Labor | Annette Hurley | 12,718 | 71.1 | +14.6 |
| Liberal | Rena Zurawel | 5,166 | 28.9 | −14.6 |
Two-candidate-preferred result
| Labor | Annette Hurley | 10,642 | 59.5 | +3.0 |
| Democrats | Don Knott | 7,242 | 40.5 | +40.5 |
| Labor hold | | Swing | N/A | |

1993 South Australian state election: Napier
| Party | Candidate | Votes | % | ±% |
|---|---|---|---|---|
| Liberal | Murray Happ | 7,381 | 38.0 | +7.9 |
| Labor | Annette Hurley | 6,110 | 31.4 | −17.9 |
| Independent | Terry Groom | 2,620 | 13.5 | +13.5 |
| Democrats | Eugene Brislan | 1,175 | 6.0 | −6.4 |
| Independent | Jack Webb | 939 | 4.8 | +4.8 |
| Grey Power | George Bell | 743 | 3.8 | +3.8 |
| Independent | Gaynor Smallwood-Smith | 463 | 2.4 | +2.4 |
| Total formal votes | | 19,431 | 95.0 | −1.3 |
| Informal votes | | 1,017 | 5.0 | +1.3 |
| Turnout | | 20,448 | 93.8 | |
Two-party-preferred result
| Labor | Annette Hurley | 9,926 | 51.1 | −10.4 |
| Liberal | Murray Happ | 9,505 | 48.9 | +10.4 |
| Labor hold | | Swing | −10.4 | |

=== Elections in the 1980s ===
1989 South Australian state election: Napier
| Party | Candidate | Votes | % | ±% |
|---|---|---|---|---|
| Labor | Terry Hemmings | 10,300 | 59.8 | −7.0 |
| Liberal | Rilda Sharp | 4,387 | 25.5 | −4.7 |
| Democrats | William Adams | 2,533 | 14.7 | +10.6 |
| Total formal votes | | 17,220 | 96.4 | +0.5 |
| Informal votes | | 638 | 3.6 | −0.5 |
| Turnout | | 17,858 | 93.6 | +1.2 |
Two-party-preferred result
| Labor | Terry Hemmings | 11,570 | 67.2 | −6.3 |
| Liberal | Rilda Sharp | 5,650 | 32.8 | +6.3 |
| Labor hold | | Swing | −6.3 | |

1985 South Australian state election: Napier
| Party | Candidate | Votes | % | ±% |
|---|---|---|---|---|
| Labor | Terry Hemmings | 10,744 | 66.8 | +1.8 |
| Liberal | Brenda Bates | 3,350 | 20.8 | −2.2 |
| Independent | John Campbell | 1,317 | 8.2 | +8.2 |
| Democrats | Barbara Barlow | 666 | 4.1 | −7.9 |
| Total formal votes | | 16,077 | 95.9 | |
| Informal votes | | 693 | 4.1 | |
| Turnout | | 16,770 | 92.4 | |
Two-party-preferred result
| Labor | Terry Hemmings | 11,814 | 73.5 | +2.5 |
| Liberal | Brenda Bates | 4,263 | 26.5 | −2.5 |
| Labor hold | | Swing | +2.5 | |

1982 South Australian state election: Napier
| Party | Candidate | Votes | % | ±% |
|---|---|---|---|---|
| Labor | Terry Hemmings | 9,862 | 63.4 | +10.8 |
| Liberal | Eric Bates | 3,775 | 24.3 | −6.7 |
| Democrats | John Ferguson | 1,920 | 12.3 | −4.0 |
| Total formal votes | | 15,557 | 91.9 | −1.5 |
| Informal votes | | 1,365 | 8.1 | +1.5 |
| Turnout | | 16,922 | 90.3 | −0.7 |
Two-party-preferred result
| Labor | Terry Hemmings | 10,768 | 69.2 | +9.7 |
| Liberal | Eric Bates | 4,789 | 30.8 | −9.7 |
| Labor hold | | Swing | +9.7 | |

=== Elections in the 1970s ===
1979 South Australian state election: Napier
| Party | Candidate | Votes | % | ±% |
|---|---|---|---|---|
| Labor | Terry Hemmings | 7,940 | 52.6 | −18.4 |
| Liberal | Eric Bates | 4,682 | 31.0 | +2.0 |
| Democrats | John Ferguson | 2,465 | 16.3 | +16.3 |
| Total formal votes | | 15,087 | 93.4 | −1.8 |
| Informal votes | | 1,058 | 6.6 | +1.8 |
| Turnout | | 16,145 | 91.0 | −0.6 |
Two-party-preferred result
| Labor | Terry Hemmings | 8,976 | 59.5 | −11.5 |
| Liberal | Eric Bates | 6,111 | 40.5 | +11.5 |
| Labor hold | | Swing | −11.5 | |

1977 South Australian state election: Napier
| Party | Candidate | Votes | % | ±% |
|---|---|---|---|---|
| Labor | Terry Hemmings | 10,350 | 71.0 | +3.3 |
| Liberal | Elizabeth Pooley | 4,238 | 29.0 | +10.9 |
| Total formal votes | | 14,588 | 95.2 | |
| Informal votes | | 727 | 4.8 | |
| Turnout | | 15,315 | 91.6 | |
| Labor hold | | Swing | +1.2 | |
