= Electoral results for the district of Hart =

South Australian district election results

This is a list of election results for the Electoral district of Hart in South Australian elections.

== Members for Hart ==
Member	Party	Term
Kevin Foley	Labor	1993–2002

== Election results ==
=== Elections in the 1990s ===
1997 South Australian state election: Hart
Party	Candidate	Votes	%	±%
Labor	Kevin Foley	11,847	63.2	+21.6
Liberal	Adam Kealley	4,052	21.6	−9.6
Democrats	Robert Fisher	2,842	15.2	+8.6
Total formal votes		18,741	96.0	+1.2
Informal votes		783	4.0	−1.2
Turnout		19,524	91.8	
Two-party-preferred result
Labor	Kevin Foley	13,620	72.7	+14.0
Liberal	Adam Kealley	5,121	27.3	−14.0
Labor hold		Swing	+14.0	

1993 South Australian state election: Hart
Party	Candidate	Votes	%	±%
Labor	Kevin Foley	7,506	40.9	+7.2
Liberal	Vincenzo Francesca	5,701	31.1	+10.8
Independent	Brian Noone	1,236	6.7	+6.7
Democrats	Peter Davies	1,155	6.3	+0.2
Independent	Clive Ford	876	4.8	+4.8
Independent	Roger Hayes	833	4.5	+4.5
Independent	Colin Shearing	780	4.3	+4.3
Natural Law	Alison Douglas	264	1.4	+1.4
Total formal votes		18,351	94.7	−2.6
Informal votes		1,017	5.3	+2.6
Turnout		19,368	93.7	
Two-party-preferred result
Labor	Kevin Foley	10,744	58.5	−13.7
Liberal	Vincenzo Francesca	7,607	41.5	+13.7
Labor gain from Independent		Swing	N/A	

- Hart is the new name of the abolished district of Semaphore, which was held by Independent Labor MP Norm Peterson, who contested the Legislative Council.
