= Electoral results for the district of Kaurna =

South Australian district election results

This is a list of electoral results for the Electoral district of Kaurna in South Australian state elections.

== Members for Kaurna ==
Member	Party	Term
Lorraine Rosenberg	Liberal	1993–1997
John Hill	Labor	1997–2014
Chris Picton	Labor	2014–present

== Election results ==
=== Elections in the 2020s ===
==== 2026 ====
2026 South Australian state election: Kaurna
Party	Candidate	Votes	%	±%
Labor	Chris Picton	10,936	45.0	−11.0
One Nation	Zoe Jones	6,552	26.9	+18.7
Greens	Sean Weatherly	2,874	11.8	+1.0
Liberal	Shane Carter	1,969	8.1	−12.6
Family First	Amanda Brohier	684	2.8	−1.5
Legalise Cannabis	Gary Haddrell	595	2.4	+2.4
Real Change	Anastasios Manolakis	572	2.4	+2.4
Australian Family	Patrick Amadio	138	0.6	+0.6
Total formal votes		24,320	95.8	−0.8
Informal votes		1,078	4.2	+0.8
Turnout		25,398	88.0	+0.2
Two-candidate-preferred result
Labor	Chris Picton	15,071	62.0	−8.1
One Nation	Zoe Jones	9,249	38.0	+38.0
Labor hold				

==== 2022 ====
2022 South Australian state election: Kaurna
Party	Candidate	Votes	%	±%
Labor	Chris Picton	13,696	56.0	+0.4
Liberal	Sarika Sharma	5,053	20.7	−7.4
Greens	Sean Weatherly	2,649	10.8	+1.7
One Nation	Peter Heggie	2,000	8.2	+8.2
Family First	Steven Price	1,050	4.3	+4.3
Total formal votes		24,448	96.6	
Informal votes		867	3.4	
Turnout		25,315	87.8	
Two-party-preferred result
Labor	Chris Picton	17,141	70.1	+4.1
Liberal	Sarika Sharma	7,307	29.9	−4.1
Labor hold		Swing	+4.1	

Distribution of preferences: Kaurna
Party	Candidate	Votes	Round 1		Round 2		Round 3	
Party	Candidate	Votes	Dist.	Total	Dist.	Total	Dist.	Total
Quota (50% + 1)		12,225						
Labor	Chris Picton	13,696	+228	13,924	+575	14,499	+2,642	17,141
Liberal	Sarika Sharma	5,053	+199	5,252	+1,153	6,405	+902	7,307
Greens	Sean Weatherly	2,649	+223	2,872	+672	3,544	Excluded	
One Nation	Peter Heggie	2,000	+400	2,400	Excluded			
Family First	Steven Price	1,050	Excluded					

=== Elections in the 2010s ===
==== 2018 ====
2018 South Australian state election: Kaurna
Party	Candidate	Votes	%	±%
Labor	Chris Picton	13,162	57.6	+10.9
Liberal	Simon McMahon	7,342	32.1	+0.5
Greens	Sean Cullen-MacAskill	2,358	10.3	+1.7
Total formal votes		22,862	95.7	−0.9
Informal votes		1,025	4.3	+0.9
Turnout		23,887	91.0	+7.8
Two-party-preferred result
Labor	Chris Picton	14,843	64.9	+5.7
Liberal	Simon McMahon	8,019	35.1	−5.7
Labor hold		Swing	+5.7	

2014 South Australian state election: Kaurna
Party	Candidate	Votes	%	±%
Labor	Chris Picton	8,844	43.4	−5.9
Liberal	Ben Caudle	6,233	30.6	−2.9
Greens	Maureen Cullen	2,041	10.0	+1.2
Independent	Kym Richardson	1,899	9.3	+9.3
Family First	Layla Nahavandi	1,347	6.6	+1.2
Total formal votes		20,364	96.6	+0.1
Informal votes		716	3.4	−0.1
Turnout		21,080	91.0	−1.4
Two-party-preferred result
Labor	Chris Picton	11,740	57.7	−1.2
Liberal	Ben Caudle	8,624	42.3	+1.2
Labor hold		Swing	−1.2	

2010 South Australian state election: Kaurna
Party	Candidate	Votes	%	±%
Labor	John Hill	10,353	49.4	−10.5
Liberal	Trisha Bird	7,036	33.6	+12.9
Greens	Yvonne Wenham	1,771	8.5	+1.0
Family First	James Chappell	1,176	5.6	−1.2
Democrats	Marie Nicholls	365	1.7	−0.4
FREE Australia	Jason Wuttke	254	1.2	+1.2
Total formal votes		20,955	95.8	
Informal votes		751	4.2	
Turnout		21,706	92.3	
Two-party-preferred result
Labor	John Hill	12,290	58.6	−13.3
Liberal	Trisha Bird	8,665	41.4	+13.3
Labor hold		Swing	−13.3	

=== Elections in the 2000s ===
2006 South Australian state election: Kaurna
Party	Candidate	Votes	%	±%
Labor	John Hill	11,827	60.2	+15.0
Liberal	Tim Flaherty	4,036	20.5	−6.6
Greens	Corrie Vanderhoek	1,444	7.3	+1.9
Family First	Paul Munn	1,328	6.8	+2.7
Democrats	Graham Pratt	423	2.2	−3.6
Independent	Barry Becker	299	1.5	+1.5
No Rodeo	Jeanie Walker	291	1.5	+1.5
Total formal votes		19,648	95.4	
Informal votes		884	4.6	
Turnout		20,532	92.3	
Two-party-preferred result
Labor	John Hill	14,153	72.0	+11.0
Liberal	Tim Flaherty	5,495	28.0	−11.0
Labor hold		Swing	+11.0	

2002 South Australian state election: Kaurna
Party	Candidate	Votes	%	±%
Labor	John Hill	8,742	45.2	+3.9
Liberal	Lauren Kenyon	5,245	27.1	−9.4
Independent	Lorraine Rosenberg	1,565	8.1	+8.1
Democrats	Beryl Hall	1,109	5.7	−7.2
Greens	Ali Valamanesh	1,053	5.4	+5.4
Family First	Colleen Pearse	787	4.1	+4.1
One Nation	Charlie McCormack	496	2.6	+2.6
SA First	James Chappell	359	1.9	+1.9
Total formal votes		19,356	96.4	
Informal votes		715	3.6	
Turnout		20,071	93.6	
Two-party-preferred result
Labor	John Hill	11,808	61.0	+6.0
Liberal	Lauren Kenyon	7,548	39.0	−6.0
Labor hold		Swing	+6.0	

=== Elections in the 1990s ===
1997 South Australian state election: Kaurna
Party	Candidate	Votes	%	±%
Labor	John Hill	7,783	42.3	+5.3
Liberal	Lorraine Rosenberg	6,527	35.5	−9.4
Democrats	Dennis Domey	2,262	12.3	+6.5
Independent	Mick Krieg	986	5.4	+5.4
Independent	Barbara Fraser	579	3.1	+3.1
United Australia	Malcolm Shaw	264	1.4	+1.4
Total formal votes		18,401	95.7	−0.3
Informal votes		832	4.3	+0.3
Turnout		19,233	92.3	
Two-party-preferred result
Labor	John Hill	10,270	55.8	+8.2
Liberal	Lorraine Rosenberg	8,131	44.2	−8.2
Labor gain from Liberal		Swing	+8.2	

1993 South Australian state election: Kaurna
Party	Candidate	Votes	%	±%
Liberal	Lorraine Rosenberg	8,230	45.1	+7.5
Labor	John Hill	6,693	36.7	−9.9
Democrats	Dennis Dorney	1,060	5.8	−6.8
Greens	Susan Regione	879	4.8	+4.8
Grey Power	John Holder	496	2.7	+2.7
Call to Australia	John Watson	407	2.2	+1.9
Independent	Denise Leek	311	1.7	+1.7
Independent	Robert Campbell	157	0.9	+0.9
Total formal votes		18,233	95.9	−0.8
Informal votes		777	4.1	+0.8
Turnout		19,010	94.0	
Two-party-preferred result
Liberal	Lorraine Rosenberg	9,625	52.8	+6.4
Labor	John Hill	8,608	47.2	−6.4
Liberal gain from Labor		Swing	+6.4	
