= Electoral results for the district of Albert Park (South Australia) =

South Australian district election results

This is a list of election results for the Electoral district of Albert Park in South Australian elections.

== Members for Albert Park ==
Member	Party	Term
Charles Harrison	Labor	1970–1979
Kevin Hamilton	Labor	1979–1993

== Election results ==
=== Elections in the 1980s ===
1989 South Australian state election: Albert Park
Party	Candidate	Votes	%	±%
Labor	Kevin Hamilton	10,572	53.8	−6.3
Liberal	Roger Hayes	7,537	38.4	+2.8
Democrats	Jim Mitchell	1,522	7.8	+3.5
Total formal votes		19,631	97.2	+0.3
Informal votes		560	2.8	−0.3
Turnout		20,191	94.8	+0.6
Two-party-preferred result
Labor	Kevin Hamilton	11,398	58.1	−4.8
Liberal	Roger Hayes	8,232	41.9	+4.8
Labor hold		Swing	−4.8	

1985 South Australian state election: Albert Park
Party	Candidate	Votes	%	±%
Labor	Kevin Hamilton	11,015	60.1	−0.9
Liberal	Bob MacKenzie	6,525	35.6	+1.6
Democrats	John Malone	795	4.3	−0.7
Total formal votes		18,335	96.9	
Informal votes		585	3.1	
Turnout		18,920	94.2	
Two-party-preferred result
Labor	Kevin Hamilton	11,530	62.9	−1.1
Liberal	Bob MacKenzie	6,805	37.1	+1.1
Labor hold		Swing	−1.1	

1982 South Australian state election: Albert Park
Party	Candidate	Votes	%	±%
Labor	Kevin Hamilton	11,012	62.7	+13.1
Liberal	Graham Ingerson	5,661	32.2	−8.6
Democrats	Ben Michael	894	5.1	−4.5
Total formal votes		17,567	93.7	−0.5
Informal votes		1,184	6.3	+0.5
Turnout		18,751	94.1	−0.1
Two-party-preferred result
Labor	Kevin Hamilton	11,459	61.1	+7.2
Liberal	Graham Ingerson	6,108	38.9	−7.2
Labor hold		Swing	+7.2	

=== Elections in the 1970s ===
1979 South Australian state election: Albert Park
Party	Candidate	Votes	%	±%
Labor	Kevin Hamilton	7,901	49.6	−14.5
Liberal	Hans Ehmann	6,507	40.8	+4.9
Democrats	Rosalyn Lawson	1,527	9.6	+9.6
Total formal votes		19,935	94.2	−2.0
Informal votes		980	5.8	+2.0
Turnout		16,915	93.4	−1.2
Two-party-preferred result
Labor	Kevin Hamilton	8,589	53.9	−10.2
Liberal	Hans Ehmann	7,346	46.1	+10.2
Labor hold		Swing	−10.2	

1977 South Australian state election: Albert Park
Party	Candidate	Votes	%	±%
Labor	Charles Harrison	10,188	64.1	+2.1
Liberal	Glendon Stotter	5,701	35.9	+13.5
Total formal votes		15,889	96.2	
Informal votes		621	3.8	
Turnout		16,510	94.6	
Labor hold		Swing	0.0	

1975 South Australian state election: Albert Park
Party	Candidate	Votes	%	±%
Labor	Charles Harrison	10,095	61.9	−9.8
Liberal	Barry Savage	3,744	23.0	−5.3
Liberal Movement	Philip Sutton	2,471	15.1	+15.1
Total formal votes		16,310	94.4	−0.1
Informal votes		972	5.6	+0.1
Turnout		17,282	93.3	−1.6
Two-party-preferred result
Labor	Charles Harrison	10,341	63.4	−8.3
Liberal	Barry Savage	5,969	36.6	+8.3
Labor hold		Swing	−8.3	

1973 South Australian state election: Albert Park
Party	Candidate	Votes	%	±%
Labor	Charles Harrison	10,716	71.7	+3.7
Liberal and Country	Valentine Dignum	4,236	28.3	−3.7
Total formal votes		14,952	94.5	−2.6
Informal votes		870	5.5	+2.6
Turnout		15,822	94.9	−0.5
Labor hold		Swing	+3.7	

1970 South Australian state election: Albert Park
Party	Candidate	Votes	%	±%
Labor	Charles Harrison	10,112	68.0	
Liberal and Country	Valentine Dignum	4,754	32.0	
Total formal votes		14,866	97.1	
Informal votes		442	2.9	
Turnout		15,308	95.4	
Labor hold		Swing		
