= Members of the South Australian Legislative Council, 1993–1997 =

This is a list of members of the South Australian Legislative Council between 1993 and 1997. As half of the Legislative Council's terms expired at each state election, half of these members were elected at the 1989 state election with terms expiring in 1997, while the other half were elected at the 1993 state election with terms expiring in 2002.

Party	Seats held	1993–1997 Council
Liberal Party of Australia	11	
Australian Labor Party	9	
Australian Democrats	2	

Name	Party	Term expiry	Term of office
Terry Cameron ^{[2]}	Labor	1997	1994–2006
Trevor Crothers	Labor	2002	1987–2002
Legh Davis	Liberal	2002	1979–2002
Peter Dunn	Liberal	1997	1982–1997
Mike Elliott ^{[1]}	Democrat	1997	1985–1993, 1994–2002
Mario Feleppa ^{[4]}	Labor	1997	1982–1995
Ian Gilfillan ^{[1]}	Democrat	1997	1982–1993, 1997–2006
Trevor Griffin	Liberal	2002	1978–2002
Paul Holloway ^{[3]}	Labor	2002	1995–2011
Jamie Irwin	Liberal	2002	1985–2002
Sandra Kanck	Democrat	2002	1993–2008
Diana Laidlaw	Liberal	1997	1982–2003
Robert Lawson	Liberal	2002	1993–2010
Anne Levy	Labor	1997	1975–1997
Rob Lucas	Liberal	1997	1982–2022
Paolo Nocella ^{[4]}	Labor	1997	1995–1997
Bernice Pfitzner	Liberal	1997	1990–1997
Carolyn Pickles	Labor	2002	1985–2002
Angus Redford	Liberal	2002	1993–2006
Ron Roberts	Labor	1997	1989–2006
Terry Roberts	Labor	2002	1984–2006
Caroline Schaefer	Liberal	2002	1993–2010
Julian Stefani	Liberal	1997	1988–2006
Chris Sumner ^{[2]}	Labor	1997	1975–1994
George Weatherill	Labor	1997	1986–2000
Barbara Wiese ^{[3]}	Labor	2002	1979–1995

^{1} Democrat MLC Ian Gilfillan resigned on 18 November 1993. Former MLC Mike Elliott was appointed to the resulting casual vacancy on 10 February 1994.
^{2} Labor MLC Chris Sumner resigned on 7 October 1994. Terry Cameron was appointed to the resulting casual vacancy on 13 September 1994.
^{3} Labor MLC Barbara Wiese resigned on 15 September 1995. Paul Holloway was appointed to the resulting casual vacancy on 26 September 1995.
^{4} Labor MLC Mario Feleppa resigned on 4 October 1995. Paolo Nocella was appointed to the resulting casual vacancy on 10 October 1995.
