= 1993 South Australian state election =

- 11 December 1993

All 47 seats in the House of Assembly 24 seats needed for a majority 11 of 22 seats in the Legislative Council
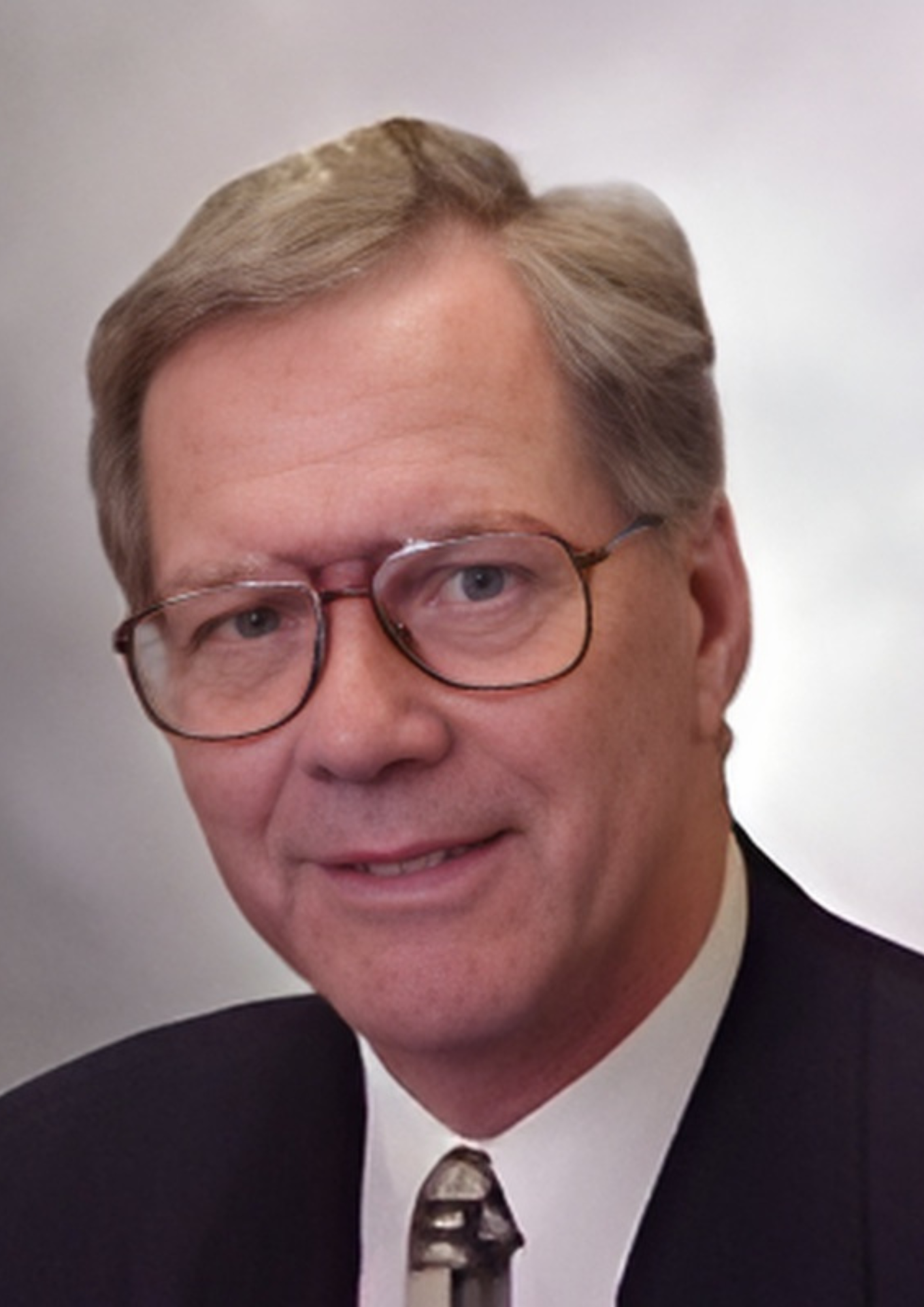

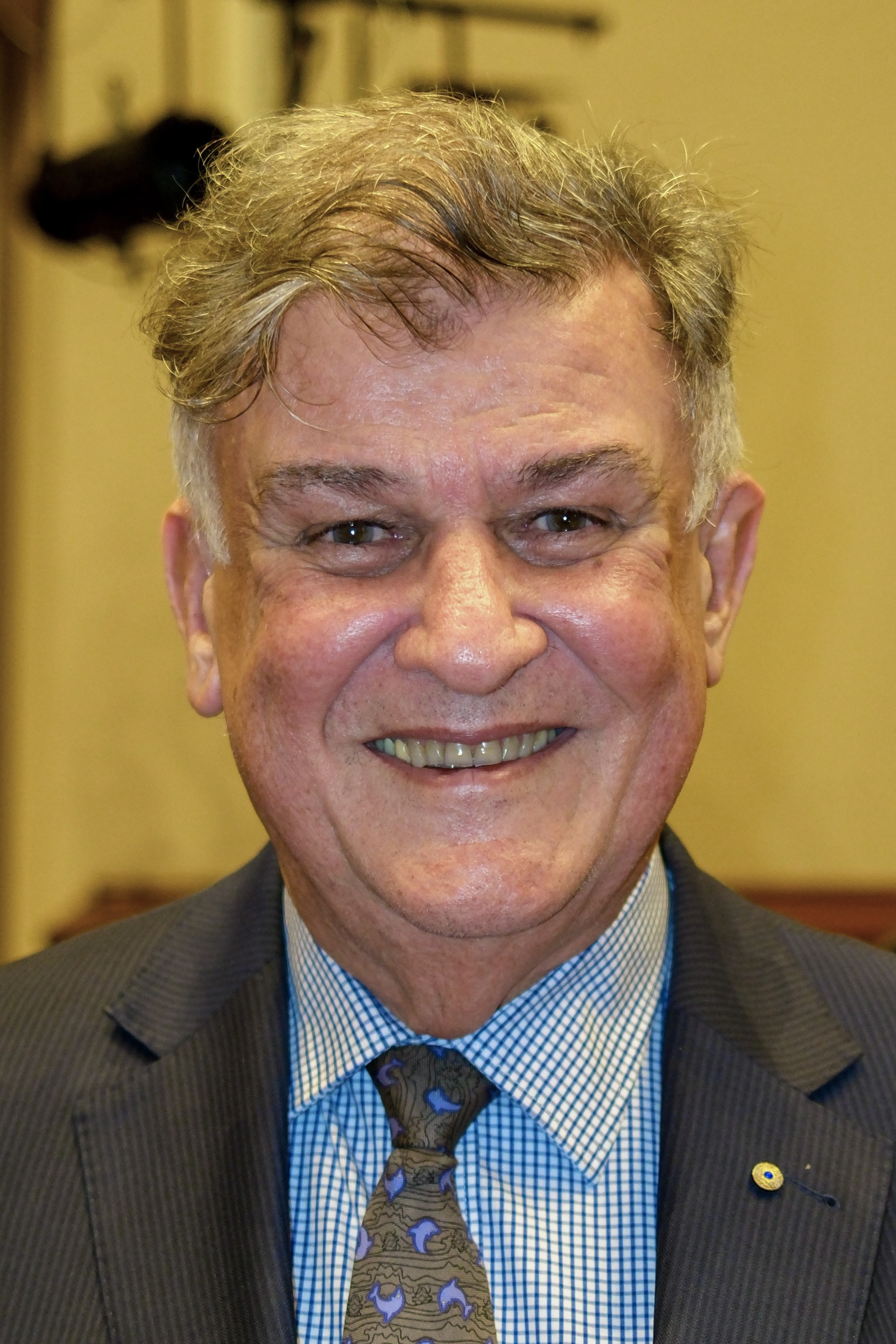

	First party	Second party	Third party
Leader	Dean Brown	Lynn Arnold	Peter Blacker
Party	Liberal	Labor	National
Leader since	11 May 1992	4 September 1992	10 March 1973
Leader's seat	Finniss	Taylor	Flinders (lost seat)
Last election	22 seats	22 seats	1 seat
Seats before	22	22	1
Seats won	37	10	0
Seat change	▲15	▼12	▼1
Primary vote	481,623	277,038	10,217
Percentage	52.80%	30.37%	1.11%
Swing	▲8.60	▼9.72	▼0.07
TPP	60.91%	39.09%
TPP swing	▲8.87	▼8.87
Premier before election
Lynn Arnold
Labor
Elected Premier
Dean Brown
Liberal

The 1993 South Australian state election was held on Saturday, 11 December 1993, to elect members of the Parliament of South Australia. All 47 seats in the House of Assembly were up for election, along with 11 of the 22 seats in the Legislative Council. The three-term incumbent Arnold Labor government were defeated in a landslide victory for the opposition Liberal Party, led by Dean Brown. The Liberals won the largest majority government in South Australian history with 37 seats in the House of Assembly, still a record for seats won by a single party in a South Australian election. Labor suffered a large swing and fell to 10 seats, their lowest amount since 1938.

This marked the Liberal's first election win since 1979, and only their second since the end of the Playmander after the 1968 election. It brought to an end a decade of Labor governance, led by John Bannon for nine of those years. It was also the first time since 1970 that no crossbenchers were elected to the House of Assembly.

Labor's historic defeat was largely attributed to the collapse of the State Bank of South Australia in 1991, which led to the resignation of Premier John Bannon the next year.

== Background ==
The campaign was dominated by the issue of the collapse of the State Bank of South Australia in 1991. The State Bank's deposits were legally underwritten by the Government of South Australia, putting South Australia into billions of dollars of debt. Labor premier John Bannon had resigned over the issue in 1992, being replaced by Lynn Arnold just over a year before the election. The Liberals also changed leaders in 1992, switching from Dale Baker to Dean Brown. Following the Labor leadership change and by early 1993, Newspoll had recorded a total rise of 13 percent in the Labor primary vote. However, the gains did not last. A warning sign of things to come came with the March 1993 federal election, which saw two of Labor's longest-held seats in South Australia, Hindmarsh and Grey, fall to the Liberals. Hindmarsh had been in Labor hands without interruption since 1919, while Grey had been in Labor hands for all but one term since 1943.

== Key dates ==
- Issue of writ: 4 November 1993
- Close of electoral rolls: 12 November 1993
- Close of nominations: Friday 19 November 1993, at noon
- Polling day: 11 December 1993
- Return of writ: On or before 7 January 1994

== Results ==
=== House of Assembly ===
South Australian state election, 11 December 1993 House of Assembly << 1989–1997 >>
Enrolled voters	1,006,035				
Votes cast	941,301		Turnout	93.57	-0.86
Informal votes	29,206		Informal	3.10	+0.27
Summary of votes by party
Party	Primary votes	%	Swing	Seats	Change
Liberal	481,623	52.80	+8.60	37	+ 15
Labor	277,038	30.37	–9.72	10	– 12
Democrats	82,942	9.09	–1.18	0	± 0
National	10,157	1.11	–0.07	0	– 1
Natural Law	9,386	1.03	+1.03	0	± 0
Independent	28,498	3.12	+1.89	0	± 0
Independent Labor	6,225	0.68	–0.83	0	– 2
Other	16,226	1.78	*	0	± 0
Total	912,095			47	
Two-party-preferred
Liberal	555,534	60.91	+8.87		
Labor	356,561	39.09	–8.87		

Popular vote
Liberal	52.80%
Labor	30.37%
Democrats	9.09%
Independents	3.81%
National	1.11%
Natural Law	1.03%
Others	1.78%

Two-party-preferred vote
Liberal	60.91%
Labor	39.09%

Seats
Liberal	78.72%
Labor	21.28%

The Liberals under Dean Brown went into the election as unbackable favourites, and swept the 11-year Labor government from power in a massive landslide. They won 37 of 47 seats (78.7 percent of the available seats, a majority of 14) in the South Australian House of Assembly from a 15-seat swing − in terms of seat count and percentage of seats won, the largest majority government in the state's history. By comparison, Sir Thomas Playford never governed with more than 23 seats in a 39-seat legislature during his record 27 years as Premier, and Don Dunstan never governed with more than 27 seats in a 47-seat legislature.

The Liberals won 60.9 percent of the two-party vote, the largest two-party preferred vote in South Australian state history (dating back to the first statewide two-party calculations from 1944). Labor fell to just 39.1 percent of the two-party vote from a two-party swing of 8.9 percent—at the time, the largest two-party swing in South Australian state history (second only to the 9.4 percent swing at the following 1997 election, and still the largest that resulted in a change of government. The 15-seat swing is still the largest in South Australian state history.

Adelaide, which had been Labor's power base in the state for decades, swung over dramatically to support the Liberals. Labor lost seats in several parts of Adelaide where it had not been seriously threatened in memory, and was cut down to only nine seats in the capital. Additionally, Labor suffered what proved to be permanent swings in much of country South Australia; it was cut down to only one seat outside of Adelaide, the Whyalla-based seat of Giles held by then-Deputy Premier Frank Blevins.

The stratospheric records for seat count and percentage of seats in the House led to predictions of a generation of Liberal government. However, the Liberal gains were short lived. Factional stoushes between the moderate and conservative wings of the Liberal Party led to Brown's factional rival, John Olsen, successfully challenging Brown for the Liberal leadership in 1996. In turn, the Liberals were reduced to a minority government as a result of the 1997 election, following another record two-party swing in the other direction of 9.5 percent.

A 1994 Torrens by-election saw Labor take the seat from the Liberals. The 1994 Elizabeth by-election and 1994 Taylor by-election saw Labor retain both seats.

=== Legislative Council ===
South Australian state election, 11 December 1993 Legislative Council << 1989–1997 >>
Enrolled voters	1,006,035				
Votes cast	941,864		Turnout	93.62	–0.91
Informal votes	33,338		Informal	3.54	–0.35
Summary of votes by party
Party	Primary votes	%	Swing	Seats won	Seats held
Liberal	470,675	51.81	+10.71	6	11
Labor	248,970	27.40	–12.35	4	9
Democrats	73,051	8.04	–2.65	1	2
HEMP	16,353	1.80	+1.80	0	0
Grey Power	14,560	1.60	–0.68	0	0
Greens	11,853	1.30	+1.30	0	0
Shooters	10,622	1.17	+1.17	0	0
Call to Australia	9,317	1.03	–1.50	0	0
National	6,516	0.72	–0.06	0	0
Green Alliance	3,960	0.44	+0.44	0	0
Independent Alliance	3,533	0.39	+0.39	0	0
Natural Law	3,421	0.38	+0.38	0	0
Other	35,695	3.93	*	0	0
Total	908,526			11	22

== Seats changing hands ==
Seat	Pre-1993			Swing	Post-1993		
Seat	Party	Member	Margin	Swing	Margin	Member	Party
Elder	Labor	Notional - New Seat	4.6	8.0	3.4	David Wade	Liberal
Elizabeth	Independent	Martyn Evans*	N/A	N/A	7.6	Martyn Evans	Labor
Flinders	National SA	Peter Blacker	6.8	14.6	7.8	Liz Penfold	Liberal
Florey	Labor	Bob Gregory	1.8	12.2	10.4	Sam Bass	Liberal
Hart	Independent	Norm Peterson*	N/A	N/A	8.5	Kevin Foley	Labor
Kaurna	Labor	Don Hopgood*	3.6	6.4	2.8	Lorraine Rosenberg	Liberal
Lee	Labor	Kevin Hamilton*	8.1	9.2	1.1	Joe Rossi	Liberal
Mawson	Labor	Susan Lenehan*	2.6	12.2	9.6	Robert Brokenshire	Liberal
Mitchell	Labor	Paul Holloway*	3.6	13.0	9.4	Colin Caudell	Liberal
Norwood	Labor	Greg Crafter	3.0	10.4	7.4	John Cummins	Liberal
Peake	Labor	Vic Heron	4.0	9.6	5.6	Heini Becker	Liberal
Reynell	Labor	Notional - New Seat	9.0	10.2	1.2	Julie Greig	Liberal
Torrens	Labor	John Klunder*	4.5	11.0	6.5	Joe Tiernan	Liberal
Unley	Labor	Kym Mayes	0.6	12.1	11.5	Mark Brindal	Liberal
Wright	Labor	Mike Rann*	5.2	9.2	4.0	Scott Ashenden	Liberal

- Members in italics did not recontest their seats.
- Martyn Evans was elected as an Independent in 1989, then joined Labor in 1993. Pre-election margin is vs. Labor, after margin is vs. Liberal.
- The new district of Hart was largely based on the abolished district of Semaphore, which had been won by Norm Peterson as an Independent in 1989.
- Don Hopgood was the sitting MP for the abolished district of Baudin, which was largely replaced by Kaurna.
- Kevin Hamilton was the sitting Labor MP for the abolished district of Albert Park, which took in parts of the new district of Lee.
- Susan Lenehan instead contested the seat of Reynell and lost.
- Paul Holloway instead contested the seat of Elder and lost.
- John Klunder was the sitting Labor MP for the abolished district of Todd, which took in most of the new district of Torrens.
- The new district of Wright was largely based on the abolished district of Briggs. The sitting Briggs MP Mike Rann instead contested the seat of Ramsay and won.

=== Redistribution affected seats ===
Seat	1989 election			1991 redistribution			Swing	1993 election		
Seat	Party	Member	Margin	Party	Member	Margin	Swing	Margin	Member	Party
Hanson	Liberal	Heini Becker*	6.1	Labor	Notional	4.9	-6.1	1.2	Stewart Leggett	Liberal
Hartley	Labor	Terry Groom*	4.5	Liberal	Notional	1.4	+11.8	13.2	Joe Scalzi	Liberal
Newland	Liberal	Dorothy Kotz	0.1	Labor	Notional	0.4	-17.8	17.4	Dorothy Kotz	Liberal

- Heini Becker contested the seat of Peake and won.
- Terry Groom was elected as a Labor member in 1989 but quit the party in 1991. He contested the seat of Napier and lost.

== Post-election pendulum ==
Liberal seats (37)
Marginal
Lee	Joe Rossi	LIB	1.1%
Hanson	Stewart Leggett	LIB	1.2%
Reynell	Julie Greig	LIB	1.2%
Kaurna	Lorraine Rosenberg	LIB	2.8%
Elder	David Wade	LIB	3.4%
Wright	Scott Ashenden	LIB	4.0%
Peake	Heini Becker	LIB	5.6%
Frome	Rob Kerin	LIB	5.7%
Fairly safe
Chaffey	Kent Andrew	LIB	6.3% vs NAT
Eyre	Graham Gunn	LIB	6.5%
Torrens	Joe Tiernan	LIB	6.5%
Norwood	John Cummins	LIB	7.4%
Flinders	Liz Penfold	LIB	7.8% vs NAT
Mitchell	Colin Caudell	LIB	9.4%
Mawson	Robert Brokenshire	LIB	9.6%
Safe
Davenport	Iain Evans	LIB	10.2% vs AD
Florey	Sam Bass	LIB	10.4%
Colton	Steve Condous	LIB	10.5%
Unley	Mark Brindal	LIB	11.5%
Hartley	Joe Scalzi	LIB	13.2%
Adelaide	Michael Armitage	LIB	14.1%
Coles	Joan Hall	LIB	15.9%
Light	Malcolm Buckby	LIB	16.4%
Newland	Dorothy Kotz	LIB	17.4%
Bright	Wayne Matthew	LIB	19.0%
Fisher	Bob Such	LIB	20.7%
Morphett	John Oswald	LIB	21.9%
Gordon	Harold Allison	LIB	22.2%
Goyder	John Meier	LIB	23.3%
Waite	Stephen Baker	LIB	23.3% vs AD
Kavel	John Olsen	LIB	24.3%
Finniss	Dean Brown	LIB	24.4%
Heysen	David Wotton	LIB	24.5%
Custance	Ivan Venning	LIB	24.5%
Ridley	Peter Lewis	LIB	25.1%
MacKillop	Dale Baker	LIB	27.7%
Bragg	Graham Ingerson	LIB	28.7%

Labor seats (10)
Marginal
Napier	Annette Hurley	ALP	1.1%
Ross Smith	Ralph Clarke	ALP	2.1%
Giles	Frank Blevins	ALP	2.4%
Playford	John Quirke	ALP	2.7%
Fairly safe
Elizabeth	Martyn Evans	ALP	7.6%
Spence	Michael Atkinson	ALP	7.7%
Taylor	Lynn Arnold	ALP	8.0%
Hart	Kevin Foley	ALP	8.5%
Ramsay	Mike Rann	ALP	9.9%
Safe
Price	Murray De Laine	ALP	11.0%

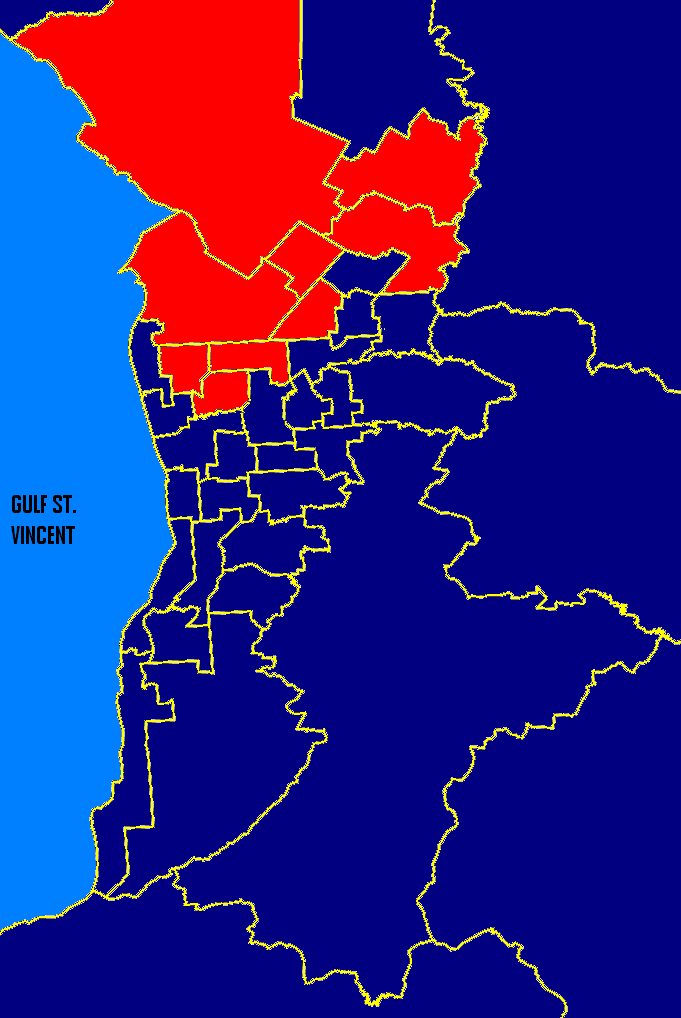
Metro SA: ALP in red, Liberal in blue. These boundaries are based on the 2006 electoral redistribution.

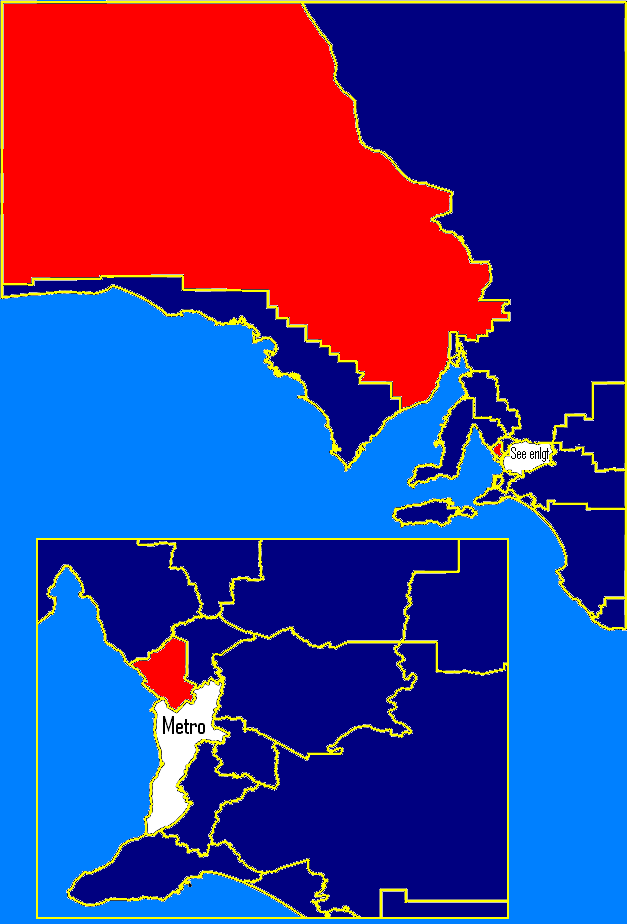
Rural SA: ALP in red, Liberal in blue. These boundaries are based on the 2006 electoral redistribution.

== See also ==
- Candidates of the South Australian state election, 1993
- Members of the South Australian House of Assembly, 1993-1997
- Members of the South Australian Legislative Council, 1993-1997
- Results of the South Australian state election, 1993 (House of Assembly)
- Results of the 1993 South Australian state election (Legislative Council)
- Previous election: 1989 South Australian state election
- Next election: 1997 South Australian state election
