= Electoral districts of South Australia =

Electorate for the South Australian House of Assembly

Since 1970, the South Australian House of Assembly — the lower house of the Parliament of South Australia — has consisted of 47 single-member electoral districts consisting of approximately the same number of enrolled voters. The district boundaries are regulated by the State Electoral Office, according to the requirements of the South Australian Constitution and are subject to mandatory redistributions by the South Australian Electoral Districts Boundaries Commission in order to respond to changing demographics.

== Boundary adjustments ==
Electoral boundaries are adjusted after each election. The number of electors in each district must be within 10% of the average at the time of the redistribution order. Other issues that may be considered include economic, social and regional communities of interest. From 1990 to 2018, it was also a requirement that each redistribution attempt to ensure that the party that obtains 50% or more of the overall vote at a general election would be able to form a government; this requirement has since been repealed.

While South Australia's total population exceeds 1.8 million, Adelaide's population exceeds 1.4 million (as at 30 June 2023) − uniquely highly centralised, over 78% of the state's population resides in the Greater Adelaide metropolitan area and has 72% of seats (34 of 47) alongside a lack of comparatively sized rural population centres, therefore the metropolitan area is crucial in deciding election outcomes. At the 2014 election for example, although the statewide two-party vote (2PP) was 47.0% Labor vs. 53.0% Liberal, the metropolitan area recorded a 2PP of 51.5% Labor v 48.5% Liberal.^{a}

Election	1970	1973	1975	1977	1979	1982	1985	1989	1993	1997	2002	2006	2010	2014	2018	2022	2026
Govt	Labor	Labor	Labor	Labor	Liberal	Labor	Labor	Labor	Liberal	Liberal	Labor	Labor	Labor	Labor	Liberal	Labor	Labor
# of seats	27	26	23	27	24	24	27	22	37	23	23	28	26	23	25	27	34
% of seats	57.4	55.3	48.9	57.4	51.1	51.1	57.4	46.8	78.7	48.9	48.9	59.6	55.3	48.9	53.2	57.4	72.34
% of vote TPP	53.3	54.5	49.2	53.4	55.0	50.9	53.2	48.1	61.0	51.5	49.1	56.8	48.4	47.0	51.94	54.59	55.7

== List of the current 47 electoral districts ==
- Adelaide
- Badcoe
- Black
- Bragg
- Chaffey
- Cheltenham
- Colton
- Croydon
- Davenport
- Dunstan
- Elder
- Elizabeth
- Enfield
- Finniss
- Flinders
- Florey
- Gibson
- Giles
- Hammond
- Hartley
- Heysen
- Hurtle Vale
- Kaurna
- Kavel
- King
- Lee
- Light
- MacKillop
- Mawson
- Morialta
- Morphett
- Mount Gambier
- Narungga
- Newland
- Ngadjuri
- Playford
- Port Adelaide
- Ramsay
- Reynell
- Schubert
- Stuart
- Taylor
- Torrens
- Unley
- Waite
- West Torrens
- Wright

== Maps ==
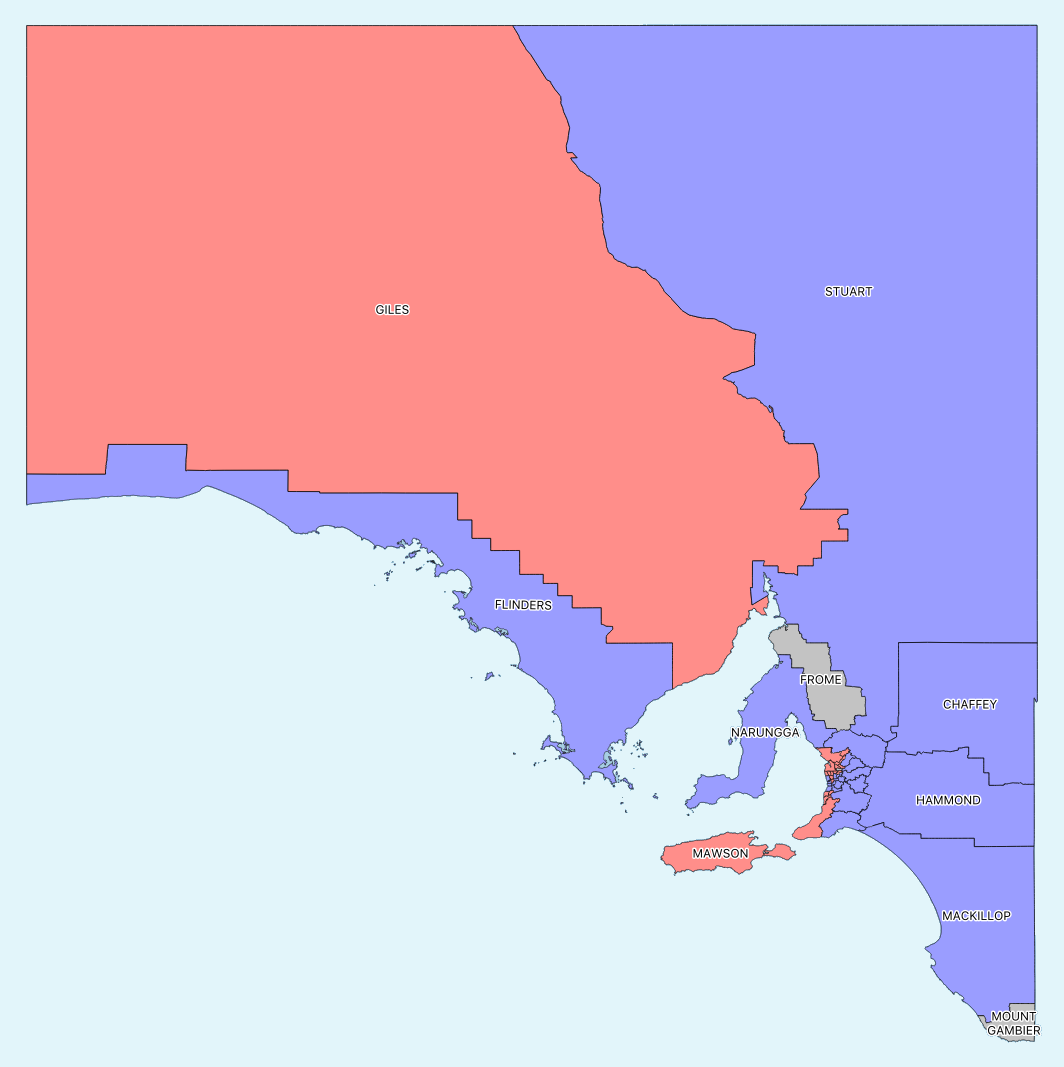
Map of outer rural electoral districts showing results from the 2018 election.

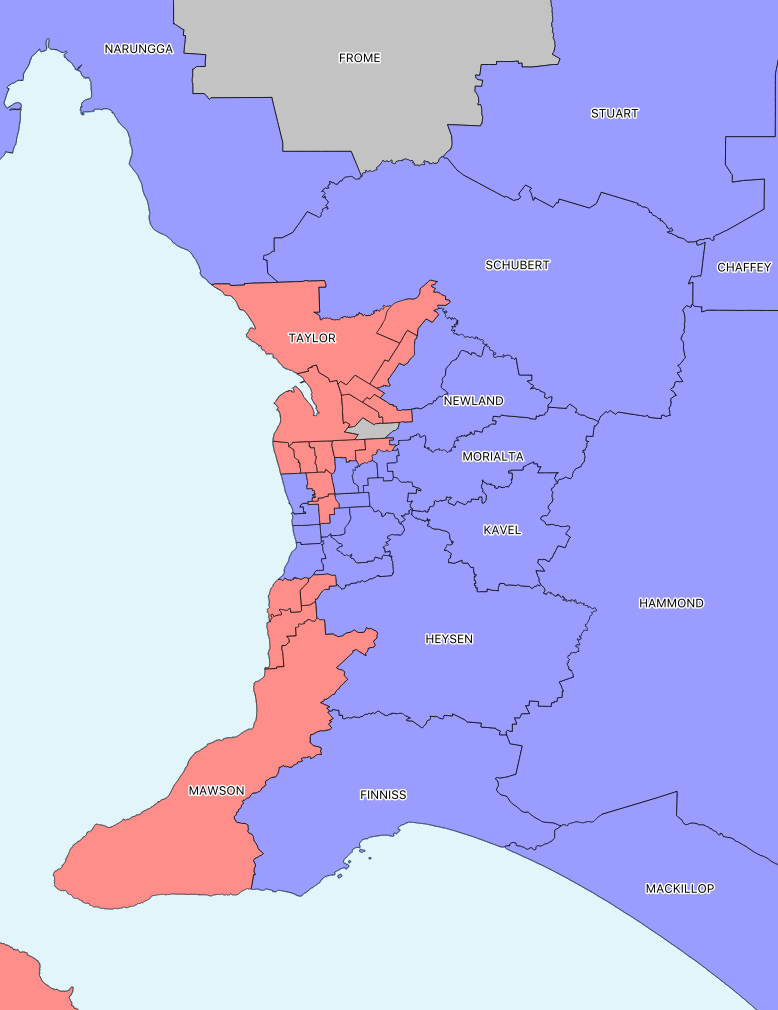
Map of metropolitan and inner rural electoral districts showing results from the 2018 election.

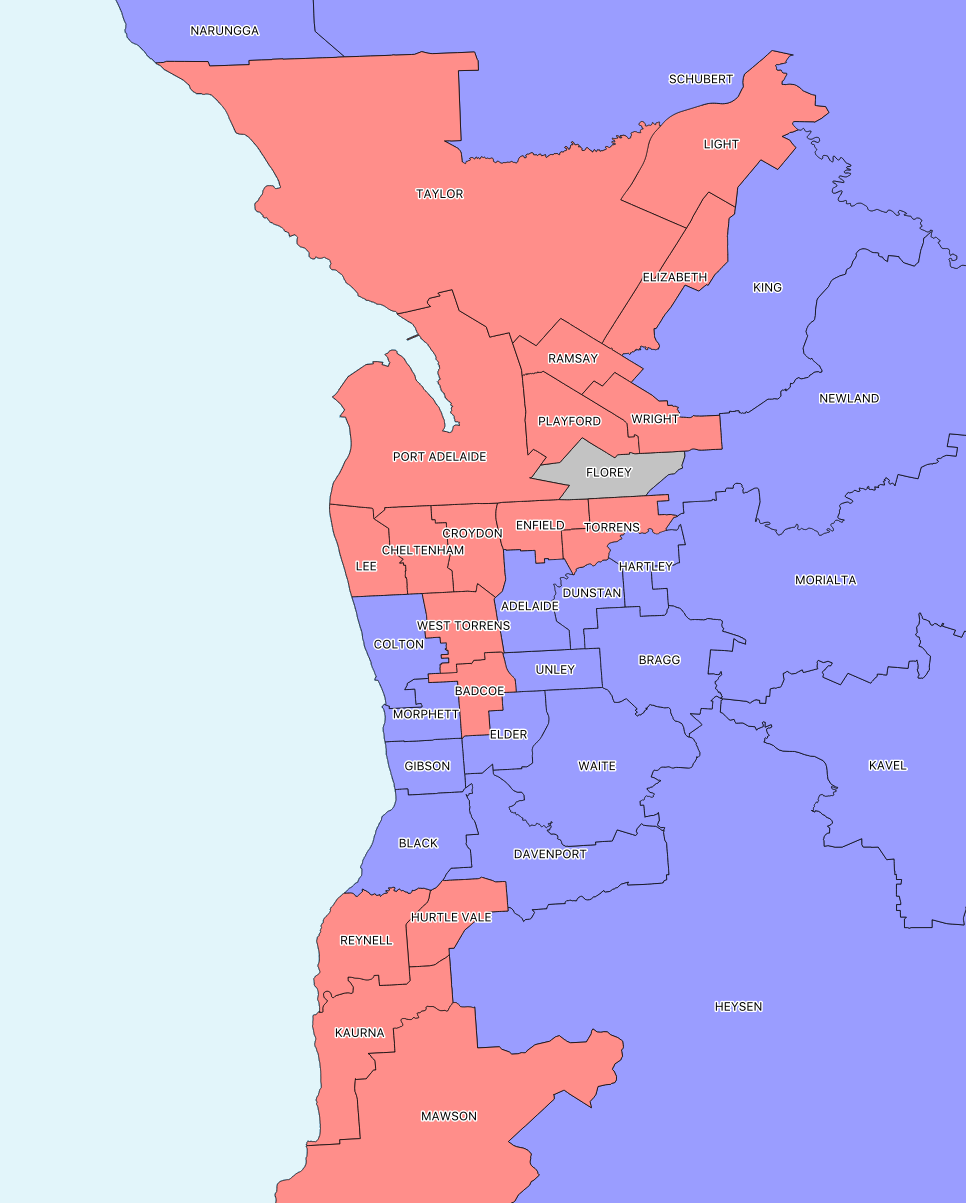
Map of metropolitan electoral districts showing results from the 2018 election.

== Numbers of electorates and members ==
From 1857 to 1933, the number of districts varied between 12 (1912–1915) and 27 (1890–1901). Each district returned from 1-6 members.

Since 1938, the South Australian House of Assembly has had single-member electoral districts. From 1938 to 1968 there were 39 districts. Since 1970 there have been 47 electoral districts.

Parliaments	Years elected	Districts	Members
1, 2	1857, 1860	17	36
3, 4, 5, 6, 7	1862, 1865, 1868, 1870, 1871	18	36
8, 9, 10	1875, 1878, 1881	22	46
11, 12	1884, 1887	26	52
13, 14, 15, 16	1890, 1893, 1896, 1899	27	54
17, 18, 19, 20	1902, 1905, 1906, 1910	13	42
21	1912	12	40
22, 23, 24, 25, 26, 27, 28	1915, 1918, 1921, 1924, 1927, 1930, 1933	19	46
29, 30, 31, 32, 33, 34, 35, 36, 37, 38, 39	1938, 1941, 1944, 1947, 1950, 1953, 1956, 1959, 1962, 1965, 1968	39	39
40, 41, 42, 43, 44, 45, 46, 47, 48, 49, 50, 51, 52, 53, 54, 55	1970, 1973, 1975, 1977, 1979, 1982, 1985, 1989, 1993, 1997, 2002, 2006, 2010, 2014, 2018, 2022, 2026	47	47

== Electoral districts ==
This table gives the number of members returned by each electoral district at each election.

	1857 -1862	1862 -1875	1875 -1884	1884 -1890	1890 -1902	1902 -1912	1912 -1915	1915 -1938	1938 -1956	1956 -1970	1970 -1985	1985 -1993	1993 -1997	1997 -2002	2002 -2014	2014 -2018	2018 -now
Districts	17	18	22	26	27	13	12	19	39	39	47	47	47	47	47	47	47
Members	36	36	46	52	54	42	40	46	39	39	47	47	47	47	47	47	47
District
Adelaide, City of	6																
Adelaide						4	4	3	1	1	1	1	1	1	1	1	1
Albert			2	2	2			2	1	1							
Albert Park											1	1					
Alexandra						4	4	3	1	1	1	1					
Angas									1	1							
Ascot Park											1	1					
Ashford															1	1	
	57-62	62-75	75-84	84-90	90-02	02-12	12-15	15-38	38-56	56-70	70-85	85-93	93-97	97-02	02-14	14-18	2018+
Badcoe																	1
Barossa	2	2	2	2	2	3	3	3		1							
Baudin											1	1	1				
Black																	1
Bragg											1	1	1	1	1	1	1
Briggs												1					
Bright												1	1	1	1		
Brighton											1						
The Burra and Clare	3																
The Burra		2	2														
Burra				2	2				1	1							
Burra Burra						3	3	3									
Burnside									1	1							
	57-62	62-75	75-84	84-90	90-02	02-12	12-15	15-38	38-56	56-70	70-85	85-93	93-97	97-02	02-14	14-18	2018+
Chaffey									1	1	1	1	1	1	1	1	1
Cheltenham															1	1	1
Coles											1	1	1	1			
Colton													1	1	1	1	1
Croydon															1	1	1
Custance												1	1				
Davenport											1	1	1	1	1	1	1
Dunstan																1	1
East Adelaide			2	2	2												
East Torrens	2	2	2	2	2			3									
Edwardstown										1							
Elder													1	1	1	1	1
Elizabeth											1	1	1	1	1		1
Encounter Bay	2	2	2	2	2												
Enfield										1					1	1	1
Eyre									1	1	1						
	57-62	62-75	75-84	84-90	90-02	02-12	12-15	15-38	38-56	56-70	70-85	85-93	93-97	97-02	02-14	14-18	2018+
Finniss													1	1	1	1	1
Fisher											1	1	1	1	1	1	
Flinders	1	2	3	2	2	3	3	2	1	1	1	1	1	1	1	1	1
Florey											1	1	1	1	1	1	1
Frome				2	2				1	1	1		1	1	1	1	1
Gawler									1	1							
Gibson																	1
Giles													1	1	1	1	1
Gilles											1	1					
Gladstone				2	2												
Glenelg									1	1	1						
Goodwood									1								
Gouger									1	1	1						
Goyder											1	1	1	1	1	1	
Gumeracha	2	2	2	2	2				1	1							
	57-62	62-75	75-84	84-90	90-02	02-12	12-15	15-38	38-56	56-70	70-85	85-93	93-97	97-02	02-14	14-18	2018+
Hammond														1	1	1	1
Hanson											1	1	1	1			
Hart													1	1			
Hartley											1	1	1	1	1	1	1
Hayward												1					
Henley Beach											1	1					
Heysen											1	1	1	1	1	1	1
Hindmarsh									1	1							
Hurtle Vale																	1
Kaurna													1	1	1	1	1
Kavel											1	1	1	1	1	1	1
King																	1
Lee													1	1	1	1	1
Light	2	2	3	2	2				1	1	1	1	1	1	1	1	1
Little Para															1	1	
	57-62	62-75	75-84	84-90	90-02	02-12	12-15	15-38	38-56	56-70	70-85	85-93	93-97	97-02	02-14	14-18	2018+
MacKillop													1	1	1	1	1
Mallee											1						
Mawson											1	1	1	1	1	1	1
Millicent										1	1						
Mitcham									1	1	1						
Mitchell											1	1	1	1	1	1	
Morialta															1	1	1
Morphett											1	1	1	1	1	1	1
Mount Barker	2	2	2	2	2												
Mount Gambier									1	1	1	1		1	1	1	1
The Murray	1																
Murray						3	3	3	1	1	1						
Murray-Mallee											1						
	57-62	62-75	75-84	84-90	90-02	02-12	12-15	15-38	38-56	56-70	70-85	85-93	93-97	97-02	02-14	14-18	2018+
Napier											1	1	1	1	1	1	
Narungga																	1
Newcastle				2	2			2	1	1							
Newland											1	1	1	1	1	1	1
Noarlunga	2	2	2	2	2												
North Adelaide			1	2	2			2									
Northern Territory					2	2											
Norwood									1	1	1	1	1	1	1		
Onkaparinga	2	2	2	2	2				1	1							
Peake											1	1	1	1			
Pirie											1						
Playford											1	1	1	1	1	1	1
Port Adelaide	2	2	2	2	2	3	3	2	1	1					1	1	1
Port Pirie								2	1	1							
Price												1	1	1			
Prospect									1								
	57-62	62-75	75-84	84-90	90-02	02-12	12-15	15-38	38-56	56-70	70-85	85-93	93-97	97-02	02-14	14-18	2018+
Ramsay												1	1	1	1	1	1
Reynell													1	1	1	1	1
Ridley									1	1			1				
Rocky River									1	1	1						
Ross Smith											1	1	1	1			
Salisbury											1						
Semaphore									1	1	1	1					
Schubert														1	1	1	1
Spence											1	1	1	1			
Stanley			2	2	2	3	3	2	1								
Stirling									1	1							
Stuart									1	1	1	1		1	1	1	1
Sturt, The	2	2															
Sturt			2	2	2			3									
Taylor													1	1	1	1	1
Tea Tree Gully											1						
Thebarton									1								
Todd											1	1					
Torrens						5	5		1	1	1		1	1	1	1	1
	57-62	62-75	75-84	84-90	90-02	02-12	12-15	15-38	38-56	56-70	70-85	85-93	93-97	97-02	02-14	14-18	2018+
Unley									1	1	1	1	1	1	1	1	1
Victoria	1	2	2	2	2			2	1	1	1	1					
Victoria and Albert						3	3										
Waite													1	1	1	1	1
Wallaroo			3	2	2	3	3	2	1	1							
Walsh												1					
West Adelaide		2	2	2	2												
West Torrens	2	2	2	2	2			2		1					1	1	1
Whyalla										1	1	1					
Wooroora			2	2	2	3	3	3									
Wright													1	1	1	1	1
Yatala	2	2	2	2	2												
Yorke Peninsula								2	1	1							
Young									1								
	1857 -1862	1862 -1875	1875 -1884	1884 -1890	1890 -1902	1902 -1912	1912 -1915	1915 -1938	1938 -1956	1956 -1970	1970 -1985	1985 -1993	1993 -1997	1997 -2002	2002 -2014	2014 -2018	2018 -now

== Abolished electoral districts ==
These electoral districts no longer exist:

- Albert
- Albert Park
- Alexandra
- Angas
- Ashford
- Ascot Park
- Barossa
- Baudin
- Briggs
- Bright
- Brighton
- Burnside
- Burra
- Burra Burra
- City of Adelaide
- Coles
- Custance
- East Adelaide
- East Torrens
- Edwardstown
- Encounter Bay
- Eyre
- Fisher
- Frome
- Gawler
- Gilles
- Gladstone
- Glenelg
- Goodwood
- Gordon
- Gouger
- Goyder
- Gumeracha
- Hanson
- Hart
- Hayward
- Henley Beach
- Hindmarsh
- Little Para
- Mallee
- Millicent
- Mitcham
- Mitchell
- Mount Barker
- Murray
- Murray-Mallee
- Napier
- Newcastle
- Noarlunga
- North Adelaide
- Northern Territory
- Norwood
- Onkaparinga
- Peake
- Pirie
- Port Pirie
- Price
- Prospect
- Ridley
- Rocky River
- Ross Smith
- Salisbury
- Semaphore
- Spence
- Stanley
- Stirling
- Sturt
- Tea Tree Gully
- The Burra
- The Burra and Clare
- The Murray
- Thebarton
- Todd
- Victoria
- Victoria and Albert
- Wallaroo
- Walsh
- West Adelaide
- Whyalla
- Wooroora
- Yatala
- Yorke Peninsula
- Young

== See also ==
- Members of the South Australian House of Assembly
- Divisions of the Australian House of Representatives

== Notes ==
^a Metropolitan 2PP correctly calculated by adding raw metro 2PP vote numbers from the 34 metro seats, both Labor and Liberal, then dividing Labor's raw metro 2PP vote from the total, which revealed a Labor metropolitan 2PP of 51.54%.
