= Terry Hemmings =

Australian politician

Member of the South Australian House of Assembly for Napier
- In office 17 September 1977 – 10 December 1993
- Preceded by: New seat
- Succeeded by: Annette Hurley

Mayor of the City of Elizabeth
- In office 1977–1979
- Preceded by: Joyce Eastland
- Succeeded by: Eve Edge

Personal details
- Born: Terence Henry Hemmings; 21 September 1936 (age 89) Carshalton, Surrey, England
- Party: Labor Party
- Spouse: Joyce May Hemmings (27/09/1958 to present)
- Children: Susan Jane Hemmings (27/06/1962) David George Hemmings (07/02/1964) Peter Terence Hemmings (19/04/1967) Louise Rose Hemmings (08/10/1969)

Terence Henry "Terry" Hemmings (born 21 September 1936) is a former Australian politician who represented the South Australian House of Assembly seat of Napier for the Labor Party from 1977 to 1993.

Hemmings held the roles of Minister of Housing and Minister of Local Government from 10 November 1982 to 10 February 1984. He replaced these with Minister of Housing and Construction from 10 February 1984 and Minister of Public Works from 19 February 1984. He added Minister of Aboriginal Affairs on 20 April 1989, but lost all ministerial positions on 14 December 1989.

He had previously been the mayor of the City of Elizabeth from 1977 to 1979.

Political offices
Preceded by John Wright	Minister for Public Works; 1984-1989	Succeeded by Kym Mayes
South Australian House of Assembly
New seat	Member for Napier; 1977–1993	Succeeded by Annette Hurley
