= Trevor Crothers =

Australian politician (1938–2002)

Trevor Crothers (20 May 1938 – 9 July 2002) was a South Australian politician. Crothers entered the South Australian Legislative Council in 1987 to fill a Labor Party vacancy, and then was re-elected as a Labor candidate in 1993. However he resigned from the party in order to support the Olsen Liberal government's legislation to privatise ETSA in 1999.

== Career ==
His first electoral test as a non-Labor candidate was at the 2002 election. He stood as an independent for the Legislative Council, but failed to get elected.
