= Electoral district of Albert Park (South Australia) =

Former state electoral district of South Australia

Coordinates: 34°53′S 138°31′E

Albert Park South Australia—House of Assembly
- State: South Australia
- Created: 1970
- Abolished: 1993
- Namesake: Albert Park, South Australia
- Demographic: Metropolitan

Albert Park was an electoral district of the House of Assembly in the Australian state of South Australia from 1970 to 1993.

The suburb of Albert Park is currently located in the safe Labor seat of Cheltenham.

== Members ==
Member	Party	Term
Charles Harrison	Labor	1970–1979
Kevin Hamilton	Labor	1979–1993
