= Liz Penfold =

Australian politician

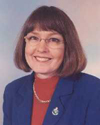
Liz Penfold

Elizabeth Meryl Penfold (born 15 September 1947) is an Australian retired politician who represented the seat of Flinders in the South Australian House of Assembly for the Liberal Party from 1993 to 2010.

She is a graduate of the Company Directors Course and is a registered lobbyist with the State Government. Prior to election into politics, her education included a Certificate in Real Estate Sales, Political Studies undertaken by correspondence from Papua New Guinea through the University of Queensland, and was a Classified Teacher from the Wattle Park Teachers College, Adelaide.

Penfold is a fellow of the Flinders University of South Australia Foundation Inc. and Member of the Eyre Peninsula Agricultural Research Foundation as well as Patron of the Lower Eyre Peninsula She has also been a member of many economic, marine and arts organisations, and has participated in hospital and health fundraising.

Penfold won Liberal preselection for Flinders at the 1993 election. The seat had been held by National Peter Blacker since 1973. Blacker sat on a seemingly insurmountable margin of 10.9 percent. However, Penfold defeated him on a swing of 14.6 percent amid that year's massive Liberal landslide, taking 57.8 percent of the two-party vote. She actually won 54 percent of the primary vote, enough to win the seat outright. She defeated Blacker just as easily in a 1997 rematch.

The 2006 election saw Penfold face a National candidate on the two party preferred vote. It was due to this that the Liberal vote collapsed from 18.3% to a margin of 10.1%. However the Liberal Labor margin was 78.6% making it the most conservative seat in the State.

Penfold held Opposition portfolios of regional development, small business and consumer affairs. She did not contest the 2010 election. Former Australian Farmers' Federation Grains Council chairman Peter Treloar won the seat for the Liberals with a collapse in the National Party vote causing the two party preferred vote being between Liberal and Labor candidates.

Parliament of South Australia
Preceded by Peter Blacker	Member for Flinders; 1993–2010	Succeeded by Peter Treloar
