= Barbara Wiese =

Australian politician

Barbara Jean Wiese (born 14 January 1950) is a former Australian politician. She was a Labor member of the South Australian Legislative Council from 1979 to 1995, when she resigned. She served on the front bench from 1985 to 1994, generally with the Tourism portfolio. She was the third woman and Labor's second elected to the Legislative Council.

== See also ==
- Women and government in Australia
- Women in the South Australian Legislative Council
