= Electoral district of Gordon (South Australia) =

Former South Australian electoral district

Gordon South Australia—House of Assembly
- State: South Australia
- Created: 1993
- Abolished: 2002
- Demographic: Rural

Gordon was an electoral district of the House of Assembly in the Australian state of South Australia from 1993 to 2002. The district was based on and around the city of Mount Gambier.

First created for the 1993 state election, it was essentially a new name for the seat of Mount Gambier. At the 2002 state election, the name Gordon was dropped and the old name of Mount Gambier was restored.

== Members for Gordon ==
Member	Party	Term
Harold Allison	Liberal	1993–1997
Rory McEwen	Independent	1997–2002
