= Kevin Hamilton (politician) =

Australian politician (born 1938)

Kevin Cyril Hamilton OAM (born 12 April 1938) was an Australian politician who represented the South Australian House of Assembly seat of Albert Park from 1979 to 1993 for the Labor Party.
