= Electoral district of Hart =

Former South Australian electoral district

Hart South Australia—House of Assembly
- State: South Australia
- Created: 1993
- Abolished: 2002
- Namesake: John Hart
- Demographic: Metropolitan

Hart was an electoral district of the House of Assembly in the Australian state of South Australia from 1993 to 2002. The district was based in the north-western suburbs of Adelaide.

The abolished seat of Semaphore became Hart for the 1993 election. Hart was a safe Labor seat. Hart was redistributed prior to the 1997 election, becoming much larger, covering most of what is now the seat of Port Adelaide. Hart was replaced by Port Adelaide at the 2002 election.

== Members for Hart ==
Member	Party	Term
Kevin Foley	Labor	1993–2002
