= Norm Peterson (politician) =

Australian politician

Norman Thomas "Norm" Peterson (born 1939) is an independent Australian politician who held the seat of Semaphore in the South Australian House of Assembly from the 1979 to the 1993 elections.

He was officially "Independent Labor", and helped the Bannon Labor government secure government after the 1989 elections, serving as Speaker of the South Australian House of Assembly from 1990 to 1993.

After his seat was abolished in a redistribution, he ran unsuccessfully for the Legislative Council in 1993. He received 1.14% of the vote, well short of the 8.3% required (after preferences) to be elected.

Peterson in his youth competed at boxing, rugby union, and rowing. He also worked as a waterside worker in Port Adelaide.

Parliament of South Australia
Preceded by Jack Olson	Member for Semaphore; 1979–1993	District abolished
Preceded by John Trainer	Speaker of the South Australian House of Assembly; 1990–1993	Succeeded by Graham Gunn
