= Lorraine Rosenberg =

Australian politician

Lorraine Florence Rosenberg (born 14 August 1951) is an Australian politician. She was a Liberal Party of Australia member of the South Australian House of Assembly from 1993 to 1997, and was then Mayor of the City of Onkaparinga from 2006 to 2018.

== Biography ==
Rosenberg attained a Bachelor of Agricultural Science, Honours in Biochemistry, Masters in Soil Conservation and other qualifications in Environmental Management Systems, and had a 15-year research career in biochemistry. She also manages a 32-hectare farm at Willunga Hill, and worked variously as General Manager of The SA Fishing Industry Council, and General Manager of The Alyntjara Wilurara Natural Resources Management Board.

In 1993, Rosenberg was elected for a term to the South Australian House of Assembly representing the seat of Kaurna from 1993 to 1997 for the Liberal Party. In 1985, she was elected as a ward councillor to the Willunga District Council. Following its amalgamation into the City of Onkaparinga, she continued her local government career, first becoming deputy mayor, then in 2006 was elected mayor. In mid-December 2016, she was also elected as president of the Local Government Association of South Australia.

In 2017 and 2018, a scandal over executive perks and misuse of council credit cards — costing ratepayers $70,000 in 18 months — came to public attention. This included the purchasing of golf club memberships, roof-top climbs, taxis and hotels for council CEO Mark Dowd, and international trips for the mayor. In May 2018, the Ombudsman commenced an investigation into the council's spending, and on 5 June 2018, the council passed a vote of no confidence in Rosenberg. Mayors around the state spoke out against the Onkaparinga council, and on 7 June, Rosenberg was asked to step down as LGASA president. Although initially intending to recontest, on 14 August, Rosenberg announced she would not run again for mayor at the 2018 local government elections. In 2022, Lorraine Rosenberg has applied to be a ward counsellor for Alexandrina Council

South Australian House of Assembly
New seat	Member for Kaurna; 1993–1997	Succeeded by John Hill
