= Annette Hurley =

Australian politician

Senator for South Australia
- In office 1 July 2005 – 30 June 2011

Deputy Leader of the Opposition (SA)
- In office 1 January 1997 – 9 February 2002
- Leader: Mike Rann
- Preceded by: Ralph Clarke
- Succeeded by: Dean Brown

Deputy Leader of the South Australian Labor Party
- In office 1 January 1997 – February 2002
- Leader: Mike Rann
- Preceded by: Ralph Clarke
- Succeeded by: Kevin Foley

Member for Napier
- In office 11 December 1993 – 9 February 2002
- Preceded by: Terry Hemmings
- Succeeded by: Michael O'Brien

Personal details
- Born: 23 March 1955 (age 71) Adelaide, South Australia
- Party: Labor Party

Annette Kay Hurley (born 23 March 1955) is a former Australian politician. Elected at the 2004 federal election, she was a Labor member of the Australian Senate from July 2005, representing the state of South Australia. She announced in July 2010 that she would not re-contest her seat at the following federal election and her six-year term ended on 30 June 2011.

Hurley was educated at the University of Adelaide, where she graduated in science. Before entering federal politics, she was member of the South Australian House of Assembly for the safe Labor seat of Napier in Adelaide's northern suburbs from 1993 to 2002, and was Deputy Leader of the Opposition 1997–2002. At the 2002 South Australian state election, she decided to stand in Light, a previously safe Liberal seat that had been made marginal in a redistribution. Hurley lost narrowly to Liberal incumbent Malcolm Buckby. At that election, Labor fell one seat short of a majority. Had Hurley won Light, she would have delivered her party majority government and become South Australia's first female Deputy Premier.

In June 2005, before even taking her seat in the Senate, Hurley was elected to the Opposition front bench and appointed Shadow Minister for Citizenship and Multicultural Affairs. She lost her front bench position in December 2006, after a shadow cabinet reshuffle instigated by new Leader of the Opposition Kevin Rudd due to criticism of her fast promotion to the frontbench despite the fact that she had been deputy leader of the SA branch of the ALP.

Her promotion to the federal frontbench was a reward for taking the political risks which saw the end of her career in the South Australian Parliament and stopped her from becoming the state's Deputy Premier rather than the misperception that it was solely because of a factional arrangement.

Political offices
Preceded by Ralph Clarke	Deputy Leader of the Opposition in South Australia; 1997–2002	Succeeded by Dean Brown
Parliament of South Australia
Preceded by Terry Hemmings	Member for Napier; 1993–2002	Succeeded by Michael O'Brien
