= Grey Power =

- Founded: c. 1983
- Dissolved: c. 1997
- Ideology: Pensioners' interests

Grey Power (or Greypower) was an Australian political party and lobby group, first registered in 1983. At the federal elections of 1984 and 1987 it ran candidates, but on both occasions these candidates (who included former Liberal cabinet minister Bill Wentworth) did poorly. The group was designed to represent the elderly vote, advocating issues dealing with aged care and a mature perspective on national policy; hence the name "grey power".

The party's state president in New South Wales was Robert Clark, an anti-immigration campaigner and the founder of the Immigration Control Association, which advocated for a return to the White Australia policy. In 1989 the party's deputy president resigned in protest at the "abhorrent literature ... anti-Asian, anti-Jews, anti-everyone" that had been circulated at party meetings.

Grey Power ran in the 1989 Western Australian state election, garnering 5.2% of the total lower house vote. However after the election a "bitter power struggle" emerged which resulted in the "virtual collapse" of the party in Western Australia. Police were called to the annual meeting of the party at a suburban hall in Dalkeith.

The Canberra Times observed in 1989 that the party "remains fractured, with, as yet, little unity of purpose among state organisations" and noted that the movement had been "dogged by allegations of links with right wing or racist groups".

The last election which Grey Power contested was the 1997 South Australian state election, but then it only managed to receive 1.6% of the South Australian Legislative Council vote. Their preferences however significantly contributed to the election of Nick Xenophon.

The best result Grey Power ever achieved was at the 1994 Taylor state by-election in South Australia. Without a Liberal candidate in the running on this occasion, Grey Power took 13 percent of the primary vote and finished second after preferences had been distributed with a 27 percent two-candidate preferred vote.

== See also ==
- List of pensioners' parties
