= Results of the 1989 South Australian state election (House of Assembly) =

South Australian state election, 25 November 1989 House of Assembly << 1985–1993 >>
Enrolled voters	941,368				
Votes cast	888,918		Turnout	94.43	+0.97
Informal votes	25,167		Informal	2.83	+0.64
Summary of votes by party
Party	Primary votes	%	Swing	Seats	Change
Liberal	381,834	44.21	+2.06	22	+ 6
Labor	346,268	40.09	–8.10	22	– 5
Democrats	88,270	10.27	+6.02	0	± 0
Call to Australia	10,974	1.30	+1.30	0	± 0
National	10,217	1.18	–0.54	1	± 0
Independent Labor	13,094	1.52	–0.77	2	± 0
Independent	10,633	1.23	+0.57	0	± 0
Other	2,011	0.23	*	0	± 0
Total	863,751			47	
Two-party-preferred
Labor	414,246	47.96	–5.21		
Liberal	449,505	52.04	+5.21		

This is a list of House of Assembly results for the 1989 South Australian state election.

== Results by electoral district ==
=== Adelaide ===
1989 South Australian state election: Adelaide
Party	Candidate	Votes	%	±%
Liberal	Michael Armitage	8,290	48.6	+1.4
Labor	Mike Duigan	6,777	38.9	−8.3
Democrats	Peter Mann	1,626	9.5	+4.0
Call to Australia	Howard Shepherd	353	2.0	+2.0
Total formal votes		17,046	98.0	+0.7
Informal votes		347	2.0	−0.7
Turnout		17,393	92.5	+3.1
Two-party-preferred result
Liberal	Michael Armitage	9,090	53.3	+3.9
Labor	Mike Duigan	7,956	46.7	−3.9
Liberal gain from Labor		Swing	+3.9	

=== Albert Park ===
1989 South Australian state election: Albert Park
Party	Candidate	Votes	%	±%
Labor	Kevin Hamilton	10,572	53.8	−6.3
Liberal	Roger Hayes	7,537	38.4	+2.8
Democrats	Jim Mitchell	1,522	7.8	+3.5
Total formal votes		19,631	97.2	+0.3
Informal votes		560	2.8	−0.3
Turnout		20,191	94.8	+0.6
Two-party-preferred result
Labor	Kevin Hamilton	11,398	58.1	−4.8
Liberal	Roger Hayes	8,232	41.9	+4.8
Labor hold		Swing	−4.8	

=== Alexandra ===
1989 South Australian state election: Alexandra
Party	Candidate	Votes	%	±%
Liberal	Ted Chapman	12,200	59.2	+3.2
Labor	Jacqueline Horton	5,286	25.6	−3.9
Democrats	Judith Logan	3,132	15.2	+8.4
Total formal votes		20,618	97.9	+3.0
Informal votes		437	2.1	−3.0
Turnout		21,055	95.2	+0.3
Two-party-preferred result
Liberal	Ted Chapman	13,599	66.0	+0.8
Labor	Jacqueline Horton	7,019	34.0	−0.8
Liberal hold		Swing	+0.8	

=== Baudin ===
1989 South Australian state election: Baudin
Party	Candidate	Votes	%	±%
Labor	Don Hopgood	9,809	48.3	−11.9
Liberal	Pamela Howard	7,349	36.2	+3.3
Democrats	Nicholas Wedge	2,466	12.2	+7.2
Independent	Lyall McDonald	663	3.3	+3.3
Total formal votes		20,287	96.6	+0.4
Informal votes		722	3.4	−0.4
Turnout		21,009	93.9	+2.0
Two-party-preferred result
Labor	Don Hopgood	11,173	55.1	−8.6
Liberal	Pamela Howard	9,114	44.9	+8.6
Labor hold		Swing	−8.6	

=== Bragg ===
1989 South Australian state election: Bragg
Party	Candidate	Votes	%	±%
Liberal	Graham Ingerson	11,585	63.8	−1.3
Labor	Jennifer Richardson	4,070	22.4	−7.1
Democrats	Margaret-Ann Williams	2,502	13.8	+8.4
Total formal votes		18,157	98.3	+0.3
Informal votes		316	1.7	−0.3
Turnout		18,473	92.8	+0.9
Two-party-preferred result
Liberal	Graham Ingerson	12,711	70.0	+2.5
Labor	Jennifer Richardson	5,446	30.0	−2.5
Liberal hold		Swing	+2.5	

=== Briggs ===
1989 South Australian state election: Briggs
Party	Candidate	Votes	%	±%
Labor	Mike Rann	10,112	55.4	−1.2
Liberal	Terry Stuart	5,912	32.4	+5.0
Democrats	Colin Maas	2,232	12.2	+7.5
Total formal votes		18,256	97.3	+1.4
Informal votes		514	2.7	−1.4
Turnout		18,770	94.7	+1.9
Two-party-preferred result
Labor	Mike Rann	11,278	61.8	−5.6
Liberal	Terry Stuart	6,978	38.2	+5.6
Labor hold		Swing	−5.6	

=== Bright ===
1989 South Australian state election: Bright
Party	Candidate	Votes	%	±%
Liberal	Wayne Matthew	8,911	44.8	−2.0
Labor	Derek Robertson	8,345	41.9	−7.6
Democrats	Ingrid O'Sullivan	2,223	11.2	+7.5
Call to Australia	Wayne Ellis	417	2.1	+2.1
Total formal votes		19,896	98.0	+0.1
Informal votes		408	2.0	−0.1
Turnout		20,304	95.8	+0.5
Two-party-preferred result
Liberal	Wayne Matthew	10,139	51.0	+2.6
Labor	Derek Robertson	9,757	49.0	−2.6
Liberal gain from Labor		Swing	+2.6	

=== Chaffey ===
1989 South Australian state election: Chaffey
Party	Candidate	Votes	%	±%
Liberal	Peter Arnold	10,716	58.6	−4.9
Labor	William Parsons	4,427	24.2	−7.3
Democrats	Mark Lobban	2,117	11.6	+6.7
Independent	Rowland Beech	1,026	5.6	+5.6
Total formal votes		18,286	97.2	−0.4
Informal votes		535	2.8	+0.4
Turnout		18,821	92.0	+2.1
Two-party-preferred result
Liberal	Peter Arnold	12,921	70.7	+4.4
Labor	William Parsons	12,921	29.3	−4.4
Liberal hold		Swing	+4.4	

=== Coles ===
1989 South Australian state election: Coles
Party	Candidate	Votes	%	±%
Liberal	Jennifer Cashmore	9,851	56.9	+2.2
Labor	Rohan Claessen	5,345	30.8	−7.7
Democrats	Pam Kelly	2,133	12.3	+6.4
Total formal votes		17,329	97.6	+1.0
Informal votes		424	2.4	−1.0
Turnout		17,753	95.3	+1.5
Two-party-preferred result
Liberal	Jennifer Cashmore	10,928	63.1	+4.7
Labor	Rohan Claessen	6,401	36.9	−4.7
Liberal hold		Swing	+4.7	

=== Custance ===
1989 South Australian state election: Custance
Party	Candidate	Votes	%	±%
Liberal	John Olsen	10,525	61.6	−1.4
Labor	Charles Greeneklee	4,337	25.4	−5.6
Democrats	Harm Folkers	998	5.8	−0.2
National	Grantley Siviour	637	3.7	+3.7
Call to Australia	Bruce Slee	594	3.5	+3.5
Total formal votes		17,091	97.4	−0.2
Informal votes		454	2.6	+0.2
Turnout		17,545	95.0	−0.2
Two-party-preferred result
Liberal	John Olsen	11,983	70.1	+3.8
Labor	Charles Greeneklee	5,108	29.9	−3.8
Liberal hold		Swing	+3.8	

=== Davenport ===
1989 South Australian state election: Davenport
Party	Candidate	Votes	%	±%
Liberal	Stan Evans	10,146	55.8	+15.2
Labor	Bruce Whyatt	4,176	23.0	−2.0
Democrats	Judy Smith	3,451	19.0	+14.9
Independent	Lorraine Foster	399	2.2	+2.2
Total formal votes		18,172	98.4	+0.2
Informal votes		288	1.6	−0.2
Turnout		18,460	94.6	+0.9
Two-party-preferred result
Liberal	Stan Evans	11,983	65.9	−3.4
Labor	Bruce Whyatt	6,189	34.1	+3.4
Liberal hold		Swing	−3.4	

=== Elizabeth ===
1989 South Australian state election: Elizabeth
Party	Candidate	Votes	%	±%
Independent	Martyn Evans	5,884	40.2	+4.0
Labor	Catherine Watkins	3,972	27.1	−15.9
Liberal	Peter Bates	3,106	21.2	+3.4
Democrats	Stephen Perkins	864	5.9	+2.9
Call to Australia	David Griffiths	430	2.9	+2.9
Independent	Arnold Ollivier	393	2.7	+2.7
Total formal votes		14,649	95.5	−0.6
Informal votes		688	4.5	+0.6
Turnout		15,337	94.1	−2.0
Two-party-preferred result
Labor	Catherine Watkins	10,109	69.0	−4.0
Liberal	Peter Bates	4,540	31.0	+4.0
Two-candidate-preferred result
Independent	Martyn Evans	9,823	67.1	+13.1
Labor	Catherine Watkins	4,826	32.9	−13.1
Independent hold		Swing	+13.1	

=== Eyre ===
1989 South Australian state election: Eyre
Party	Candidate	Votes	%	±%
Liberal	Graham Gunn	9,745	62.0	−1.8
Labor	Gregory Giddens	4,273	27.2	−4.6
Democrats	Jack Babbage	1,088	6.9	+2.5
National	Jillian Anderson	600	3.8	+3.8
Total formal votes		15,706	97.3	+1.7
Informal votes		435	2.7	−1.7
Turnout		16,141	89.2	+0.3
Two-party-preferred result
Liberal	Graham Gunn	10,777	68.6	+2.8
Labor	Gregory Giddens	4,929	31.4	−2.8
Liberal hold		Swing	+2.8	

=== Fisher ===
1989 South Australian state election: Fisher
Party	Candidate	Votes	%	±%
Liberal	Bob Such	11,653	46.4	−0.5
Labor	Philip Tyler	10,238	40.8	−7.6
Democrats	Terry Clark	2,346	9.3	+4.6
Call to Australia	John Watson	511	2.0	+2.0
Independent	Alison Kent	364	1.5	+1.5
Total formal votes		25,112	97.8	−0.3
Informal votes		562	2.2	+0.3
Turnout		25,674	95.7	+0.8
Two-party-preferred result
Liberal	Bob Such	13,323	53.1	+4.2
Labor	Philip Tyler	11,789	46.9	−4.2
Liberal gain from Labor		Swing	+4.2	

=== Flinders ===
1989 South Australian state election: Flinders
Party	Candidate	Votes	%	±%
National	Peter Blacker	8,241	48.3	+8.9
Liberal	Kieran Kelly	6,148	36.1	−2.6
Labor	Terrence Krieg	2,156	12.6	−7.2
Democrats	Trevor Blood	510	3.0	+0.8
Total formal votes		17,055	98.4	+0.3
Informal votes		283	1.6	−0.3
Turnout		17,338	94.7	+0.7
Two-party-preferred result
National	Peter Blacker	13,337	78.2	+4.0
Labor	Terrence Krieg	3,718	21.8	−4.0
Two-candidate-preferred result
National	Peter Blacker	10,392	60.9	+2.6
Liberal	Kieran Kelly	6,663	39.1	−2.6
National hold		Swing	+2.6	

=== Florey ===
1989 South Australian state election: Florey
Party	Candidate	Votes	%	±%
Labor	Bob Gregory	9,591	44.4	−11.1
Liberal	Richard Luther	8,650	40.1	+0.8
Democrats	Steve Bartholomew	2,143	9.9	+4.7
Call to Australia	Cathryn Linedale	740	3.4	+3.4
Independent	Deborah Moran	474	2.2	+2.2
Total formal votes		21,598	96.7	−0.4
Informal votes		729	3.3	+0.4
Turnout		22,327	95.6	+0.6
Two-party-preferred result
Labor	Bob Gregory	11,181	51.8	−6.4
Liberal	Richard Luther	10,417	48.2	+6.4
Labor hold		Swing	−6.4	

=== Gilles ===
1989 South Australian state election: Gilles
Party	Candidate	Votes	%	±%
Labor	Colin McKee	8,177	49.8	−10.8
Liberal	Steven Beardon	6,090	37.1	+4.1
Democrats	Stephen Swift	2,156	13.1	+6.7
Total formal votes		16,423	96.6	+0.2
Informal votes		570	3.4	−0.2
Turnout		16,993	95.3	+0.9
Two-party-preferred result
Labor	Colin McKee	9,293	56.6	−7.6
Liberal	Steven Beardon	7,130	43.4	+7.6
Labor hold		Swing	−7.6	

=== Goyder ===
1989 South Australian state election: Goyder
Party	Candidate	Votes	%	±%
Liberal	John Meier	12,641	62.1	+2.5
Labor	Brenton Walker	6,221	30.5	−5.3
Democrats	Derek Emery	1,507	7.4	+2.8
Total formal votes		20,369	97.8	+0.4
Informal votes		454	2.2	−0.4
Turnout		20,823	95.6	+0.6
Two-party-preferred result
Liberal	John Meier	13,518	66.4	+4.0
Labor	Brenton Walker	6,851	33.6	−4.0
Liberal hold		Swing	+4.0	

=== Hanson ===
1989 South Australian state election: Hanson
Party	Candidate	Votes	%	±%
Liberal	Heini Becker	9,130	52.4	+3.5
Labor	Ian Peak	6,863	39.4	−8.0
Democrats	Mary McEwen	1,435	8.2	+4.5
Total formal votes		17,428	97.6	+0.3
Informal votes		419	2.4	−0.3
Turnout		17,847	94.1	+0.4
Two-party-preferred result
Liberal	Heini Becker	9,779	56.1	+5.2
Labor	Ian Peak	7,649	43.9	−5.2
Liberal hold		Swing	+5.2	

=== Hartley ===
1989 South Australian state election: Hartley
Party	Candidate	Votes	%	±%
Labor	Terry Groom	8,371	47.7	−11.9
Liberal	Joe Scalzi	7,094	40.4	+5.2
Democrats	Arlyn Tombleson	2,087	11.9	+6.7
Total formal votes		17,552	96.4	+0.5
Informal votes		652	3.6	−0.5
Turnout		18,204	94.4	+1.0
Two-party-preferred result
Labor	Terry Groom	9,563	54.5	−8.0
Liberal	Joe Scalzi	7,989	45.5	+8.0
Labor hold		Swing	−8.0	

=== Hayward ===
1989 South Australian state election: Hayward
Party	Candidate	Votes	%	±%
Liberal	Mark Brindal	7,266	43.6	−1.0
Labor	June Appleby	7,115	42.7	−7.4
Democrats	Elizabeth Williams	1,556	9.3	+4.1
Call to Australia	Reg Macey	450	2.7	+2.7
Independent	Mary Down	289	1.7	+1.7
Total formal votes		16,676	97.5	−0.2
Informal votes		423	2.5	+0.2
Turnout		17,099	95.4	+0.4
Two-party-preferred result
Liberal	Mark Brindal	8,495	50.9	+3.7
Labor	June Appleby	8,181	49.1	−3.7
Liberal gain from Labor		Swing	+3.7	

=== Henley Beach ===
1989 South Australian state election: Henley Beach
Party	Candidate	Votes	%	±%
Labor	Don Ferguson	9,040	48.5	−6.1
Liberal	Bob Randall	7,673	41.1	+1.3
Democrats	Keith Lees	1,518	8.1	+3.9
Call to Australia	Peter Thompson	428	2.3	+2.3
Total formal votes		18,659	96.6	−0.2
Informal votes		657	3.4	+0.2
Turnout		19,316	95.0	+0.5
Two-party-preferred result
Labor	Don Ferguson	10,077	54.0	−3.3
Liberal	Bob Randall	8,582	46.0	+3.3
Labor hold		Swing	−3.3	

=== Heysen ===
1989 South Australian state election: Heysen
Party	Candidate	Votes	%	±%
Liberal	David Wotton	11,162	57.0	+2.6
Labor	Jillian Bromley	5,131	26.2	−11.3
Democrats	Merilyn Pedrick	3,299	16.8	+10.5
Total formal votes		19,592	98.1	+0.7
Informal votes		369	1.9	−0.7
Turnout		19,961	94.3	+1.2
Two-party-preferred result
Liberal	David Wotton	12,749	65.1	+6.3
Labor	Jillian Bromley	6,843	34.9	−6.3
Liberal hold		Swing	+6.3	

=== Kavel ===
1989 South Australian state election: Kavel
Party	Candidate	Votes	%	±%
Liberal	Roger Goldsworthy	11,560	55.8	+3.7
Labor	Warren Smith	5,410	26.1	−8.9
Democrats	Michel Francis	2,698	13.0	+13.0
Call to Australia	Graeme Watts	1,046	5.1	+5.1
Total formal votes		20,714	97.8	+0.8
Informal votes		465	2.2	−0.8
Turnout		21,179	95.6	+2.1
Two-party-preferred result
Liberal	Roger Goldsworthy	13,567	65.5	+3.7
Labor	Warren Smith	7,174	34.5	−3.7
Liberal hold		Swing	+3.7	

=== Light ===
1989 South Australian state election: Light
Party	Candidate	Votes	%	±%
Liberal	Bruce Eastick	10,912	53.5	−2.1
Labor	Tony Piccolo	6,564	32.2	−5.3
Democrats	John Joyes	1,500	7.4	+2.8
Call to Australia	Theodor Stiller	1,206	5.9	+5.9
Independent	Eric Gerlach	207	1.0	−1.3
Total formal votes		20,389	97.0	+1.6
Informal votes		623	3.0	−1.6
Turnout		21,012	95.9	+1.4
Two-party-preferred result
Liberal	Bruce Eastick	12,818	62.9	+3.6
Labor	Tony Piccolo	7,571	37.1	−3.6
Liberal hold		Swing	+3.6	

=== Mawson ===
1989 South Australian state election: Mawson
Party	Candidate	Votes	%	±%
Labor	Susan Lenehan	10,484	49.6	−13.2
Liberal	Craig Spencer	7,776	36.8	+5.8
Democrats	Dennis Dorney	2,857	13.6	+7.4
Total formal votes		21,117	97.3	+0.2
Informal votes		593	2.7	−0.2
Turnout		21,710	94.9	+2.2
Two-party-preferred result
Labor	Susan Lenehan	12,105	57.3	−8.8
Liberal	Craig Spencer	9,012	42.7	+8.8
Labor hold		Swing	−8.8	

=== Mitcham ===
1989 South Australian state election: Mitcham
Party	Candidate	Votes	%	±%
Liberal	Stephen Baker	9,883	55.3	−0.2
Labor	Timothy Campbell	5,671	31.7	−5.9
Democrats	Matthew Greenwood	2,312	12.9	+6.0
Total formal votes		17,866	98.1	+1.2
Informal votes		346	1.9	−1.2
Turnout		18,212	93.2	+0.3
Two-party-preferred result
Liberal	Stephen Baker	10,890	61.0	+2.7
Labor	Timothy Campbell	6,976	39.0	−2.7
Liberal hold		Swing	+2.7	

=== Mitchell ===
1989 South Australian state election: Mitchell
Party	Candidate	Votes	%	±%
Labor	Paul Holloway	8,187	47.9	−12.9
Liberal	Darryl Parslow	6,695	39.2	+4.8
Democrats	Sue Ann Carver	2,196	12.9	+8.1
Total formal votes		17,078	97.2	+0.8
Informal votes		492	2.8	−0.8
Turnout		17,570	94.6	+0.6
Two-party-preferred result
Labor	Paul Holloway	9,279	54.3	−9.2
Liberal	Darryl Parslow	7,799	45.7	+9.2
Labor hold		Swing	−9.2	

=== Morphett ===
1989 South Australian state election: Morphett
Party	Candidate	Votes	%	±%
Liberal	John Oswald	9,364	55.1	+2.4
Labor	Trevor Peikert	5,917	34.8	−8.2
Democrats	Rosalina Bouchee	1,724	10.1	+5.8
Total formal votes		17,005	98.2	+0.9
Informal votes		318	1.8	−0.9
Turnout		17,323	93.6	−0.2
Two-party-preferred result
Liberal	John Oswald	10,199	60.0	+5.3
Labor	Trevor Peikert	6,806	40.0	−5.3
Liberal hold		Swing	+5.3	

=== Mount Gambier ===
1989 South Australian state election: Mount Gambier
Party	Candidate	Votes	%	±%
Liberal	Harold Allison	12,394	67.6	+8.7
Labor	Brenton Lynch	4,383	23.9	−15.0
Democrats	Glenn Taylor	380	2.2	+3.8
Call to Australia	Johannes Bastiaens	464	2.5	+2.5
Total formal votes		18,336	98.2	+1.0
Informal votes		337	1.8	−1.0
Turnout		18,673	94.9	−1.0
Two-party-preferred result
Liberal	Harold Allison	13,286	72.5	+12.6
Labor	Brenton Lynch	5,050	27.5	−12.6
Liberal hold		Swing	+12.6	

=== Murray-Mallee ===
1989 South Australian state election: Murray-Mallee
Party	Candidate	Votes	%	±%
Liberal	Peter Lewis	11,774	63.7	+5.5
Labor	Jane Milek	4,240	23.0	−5.2
Democrats	Jeannette Jolley	1,717	9.3	+7.3
National	Douglas Lindley	739	4.0	−4.7
Total formal votes		18,470	97.3	+0.1
Informal votes		517	2.7	−0.1
Turnout		18,987	95.0	+1.0
Two-party-preferred result
Liberal	Peter Lewis	13,417	72.6	+4.0
Labor	Jane Milek	5,053	27.4	−4.0
Liberal hold		Swing	+4.0	

=== Napier ===
1989 South Australian state election: Napier
Party	Candidate	Votes	%	±%
Labor	Terry Hemmings	10,300	59.8	−7.0
Liberal	Rilda Sharp	4,387	25.5	−4.7
Democrats	William Adams	2,533	14.7	+10.6
Total formal votes		17,220	96.4	+0.5
Informal votes		638	3.6	−0.5
Turnout		17,858	93.6	+1.2
Two-party-preferred result
Labor	Terry Hemmings	11,570	67.2	−6.3
Liberal	Rilda Sharp	5,650	32.8	+6.3
Labor hold		Swing	−6.3	

=== Newland ===
1989 South Australian state election: Newland
Party	Candidate	Votes	%	±%
Labor	Di Gayler	9,282	44.6	−4.5
Liberal	Dorothy Kotz	8,989	43.1	−3.3
Democrats	Patrick Kavanagh	1,628	7.8	+3.3
Call to Australia	Dennis Brown	930	4.5	+4.5
Total formal votes		20,829	97.8	+0.2
Informal votes		466	2.2	−0.2
Turnout		21,295	95.9	+0.9
Two-party-preferred result
Liberal	Dorothy Kotz	10,438	50.1	+1.6
Labor	Di Gayler	10,391	49.9	−1.6
Liberal gain from Labor		Swing	+1.6	

=== Norwood ===
1989 South Australian state election: Norwood
Party	Candidate	Votes	%	±%
Labor	Greg Crafter	7,502	44.3	−8.9
Liberal	Robert Jackson	7,169	42.4	+0.6
Democrats	Cathi Tucker-Lee	1,818	10.7	+5.7
Call to Australia	Belle Harris	247	1.5	+1.5
Independent	Alison Cox	194	1.1	+1.1
Total formal votes		16,930	96.8	−0.5
Informal votes		556	3.2	+0.5
Turnout		17,486	93.2	+0.8
Two-party-preferred result
Labor	Greg Crafter	8,887	52.5	−3.8
Liberal	Robert Jackson	8,043	47.5	+3.8
Labor hold		Swing	−3.8	

=== Peake ===
1989 South Australian state election: Peake
Party	Candidate	Votes	%	±%
Labor	Vic Heron	8,965	51.9	−10.0
Liberal	Darcy Constantine	5,784	33.5	−1.9
Democrats	Stephen Crabbe	1,707	9.9	+5.3
Socialist Alliance	Philippa Skinner	422	2.5	+2.5
Call to Australia	Terry Lear	385	2.2	+2.2
Total formal votes		17,263	94.5	+1.5
Informal votes		1,004	5.5	−1.5
Turnout		18,267	93.5	0.0
Two-party-preferred result
Labor	Vic Heron	10,355	60.0	−5.7
Liberal	Darcy Constantine	6,908	40.0	+5.7
Labor hold		Swing	−5.7	

=== Playford ===
1989 South Australian state election: Playford
Party	Candidate	Votes	%	±%
Labor	John Quirke	9,244	51.6	−14.7
Liberal	Peter Panagaris	5,859	32.7	+4.6
Democrats	Andrew Sickerdick	2,823	15.7	+10.1
Total formal votes		17,926	96.3	+2.4
Informal votes		683	3.7	−2.4
Turnout		18,609	94.8	+0.8
Two-party-preferred result
Labor	John Quirke	10,597	59.1	−10.3
Liberal	Peter Panagaris	7,329	40.9	+10.3
Labor hold		Swing	−10.3	

=== Price ===
1989 South Australian state election: Price
Party	Candidate	Votes	%	±%
Labor	Murray De Laine	10,813	60.7	−8.7
Liberal	Bernice Pfitzner	5,282	29.7	+6.0
Democrats	Martin Kay	1,702	9.6	+2.7
Total formal votes		17,797	95.2	+0.4
Informal votes		904	4.8	−0.4
Turnout		18,701	94.3	+1.4
Two-party-preferred result
Labor	Murray De Laine	11,854	66.3	−8.0
Liberal	Bernice Pfitzner	5,943	33.4	+8.0
Labor hold		Swing	−8.0	

=== Ramsay ===
1989 South Australian state election: Ramsay
Party	Candidate	Votes	%	±%
Labor	Lynn Arnold	13,369	60.6	−13.6
Liberal	Brenda Bates	6,233	28.2	+2.4
Democrats	Shylie Holden	2,465	11.2	+11.2
Total formal votes		22,067	96.0	+0.6
Informal votes		921	4.0	−0.6
Turnout		22,988	94.5	−0.9
Two-party-preferred result
Labor	Lynn Arnold	14,728	66.7	−7.5
Liberal	Brenda Bates	7,339	33.3	+7.5
Labor hold		Swing	−7.5	

=== Ross Smith ===
1989 South Australian state election: Ross Smith
Party	Candidate	Votes	%	±%
Labor	John Bannon	9,918	59.0	−6.9
Liberal	Christopher Pyne	5,297	31.5	+2.0
Democrats	Brian Fain	1,590	9.5	+4.9
Total formal votes		16,805	96.8	+0.7
Informal votes		559	3.2	−0.7
Turnout		17,364	94.6	+0.7
Two-party-preferred result
Labor	John Bannon	10,745	64.1	−4.6
Liberal	Christopher Pyne	6,023	35.9	+4.6
Labor hold		Swing	−4.6	

=== Semaphore ===
1989 South Australian state election: Semaphore
Party	Candidate	Votes	%	±%
Independent	Norm Peterson	7,210	40.0	−1.7
Labor	Kevin Foley	6,069	33.7	−7.3
Liberal	Terence Daviess	3,655	20.2	+3.9
Democrats	Eric Mack	1,097	6.1	+5.1
Total formal votes		18,031	97.3	+0.2
Informal votes		494	2.7	−0.2
Turnout		18,525	94.5	+0.1
Two-party-preferred result
Labor	Kevin Foley	12,712	70.5	−4.5
Liberal	Terence Daviess	5,319	29.5	+4.5
Two-candidate-preferred result
Independent	Norm Peterson	11,319	62.8	+5.5
Labor	Kevin Foley	6,712	37.2	−5.5
Independent hold		Swing	+5.5	

=== Spence ===
1989 South Australian state election: Spence
Party	Candidate	Votes	%	±%
Labor	Michael Atkinson	9,762	55.3	−9.5
Liberal	Rod Scarborough	4,668	26.4	−3.4
Democrats	Brian O'Leary	1,350	7.6	+2.2
Grey Power	Florence Pens	1,275	7.2	+7.2
Socialist Alliance	Dennis White	314	1.8	+1.8
Call to Australia	Catherine Sparrow	290	1.7	+1.7
Total formal votes		17,659	94.1	−1.9
Informal votes		1,103	5.9	+1.9
Turnout		18,762	93.9	+0.6
Two-party-preferred result
Labor	Michael Atkinson	11,298	64.0	−4.4
Liberal	Rod Scarborough	6,361	36.0	+4.4
Labor hold		Swing	−4.4	

=== Stuart ===
1989 South Australian state election: Stuart
Party	Candidate	Votes	%	±%
Labor	Colleen Hutchison	8,573	48.9	−18.6
Independent	Nancy Baluch	3,857	22.0	+22.0
Liberal	Simon Dawson	2,517	14.4	−10.5
Call to Australia	David Squirrell	1,691	9.6	+9.6
Democrats	Kaye Matthews	887	5.1	+1.9
Total formal votes		17,525	97.3	+4.3
Informal votes		482	2.7	−4.3
Turnout		18,007	94.0	+1.0
Two-party-preferred result
Labor	Colleen Hutchison	11,917	68.0	−4.0
Liberal	Simon Dawson	5,608	32.0	+4.0
Two-candidate-preferred result
Labor	Colleen Hutchison	9,853	56.2	−15.8
Independent	Nancy Baluch	7,672	43.8	+43.8
Labor hold		Swing	N/A	

=== Todd ===
1989 South Australian state election: Todd
Party	Candidate	Votes	%	±%
Labor	John Klunder	8,822	46.8	−6.4
Liberal	Ernest Harders de Braconier	7,635	40.5	−1.7
Democrats	David Ball	1,834	9.7	+5.1
Call to Australia	Tom Curnow	557	3.0	+3.0
Total formal votes		18,848	97.0	+0.3
Informal votes		580	3.0	−0.3
Turnout		19,428	95.7	−1.0
Two-party-preferred result
Labor	John Klunder	9,958	52.8	−3.1
Liberal	Ernest Harders de Braconier	8,890	47.2	+3.1
Labor hold		Swing	−3.1	

=== Unley ===
1989 South Australian state election: Unley
Party	Candidate	Votes	%	±%
Labor	Kym Mayes	7,662	44.9	−7.1
Liberal	Joy Nimon	7,222	41.5	−1.1
Democrats	Mark Basham	1,732	10.0	+6.0
Independent	Jennie Williams	536	3.0	+3.0
Call to Australia	David Peake	235	1.4	+1.4
Total formal votes		17,387	97.4	+0.7
Informal votes		471	2.6	−0.7
Turnout		17,858	92.8	+2.0
Two-party-preferred result
Labor	Kym Mayes	9,102	52.3	−2.7
Liberal	Joy Nimon	8,285	47.7	+2.7
Labor hold		Swing	−2.7	

=== Victoria ===
1989 South Australian state election: Victoria
Party	Candidate	Votes	%	±%
Liberal	Dale Baker	12,892	68.9	+19.5
Labor	Ray Tunks	4,401	23.5	−3.6
Democrats	Johannes Cullen	1,420	7.6	+4.8
Total formal votes		18,713	98.2	+1.7
Informal votes		348	1.8	−1.7
Turnout		19,061	94.7	+0.2
Two-party-preferred result
Liberal	Dale Baker	13,706	73.2	+4.9
Labor	Ray Tunks	5,007	26.8	−4.9
Liberal hold		Swing	+4.9	

=== Walsh ===
1989 South Australian state election: Walsh
Party	Candidate	Votes	%	±%
Labor	John Trainer	8,520	50.4	−6.3
Liberal	Douglas Rowe	6,623	39.1	+4.8
Democrats	Richard Bennett	1,776	10.5	+6.7
Total formal votes		16,919	96.9	+2.5
Informal votes		542	3.1	−2.5
Turnout		17,461	94.5	+0.1
Two-party-preferred result
Labor	John Trainer	9,532	56.3	−4.4
Liberal	Douglas Rowe	7,387	43.7	+4.4
Labor hold		Swing	−4.4	

=== Whyalla ===
1989 South Australian state election: Whyalla
Party	Candidate	Votes	%	±%
Labor	Frank Blevins	7,806	51.1	−2.8
Liberal	Naomi Perry	3,884	25.5	+1.9
Independent	George Crowe	2,231	14.6	+14.6
Democrats	Rosemary Gloede	1,348	8.8	+6.7
Total formal votes		15,269	97.0	+0.7
Informal votes		479	3.0	−0.7
Turnout		15,748	94.0	+1.8
Two-party-preferred result
Labor	Frank Blevins	9,299	60.9	−6.1
Liberal	Naomi Perry	5,970	39.1	+6.1
Labor hold		Swing	−6.1	

== See also ==
- Candidates of the 1989 South Australian state election
- Members of the South Australian House of Assembly, 1989–1993
