= Candidates of the 1989 South Australian state election =

The 1989 South Australian state election was held on 25 November 1989.

== Retiring Members ==
=== Labor ===
- Roy Abbott MHA (Spence)
- Gavin Keneally MHA (Stuart)
- Terry McRae MHA (Playford)
- Ron Payne MHA (Mitchell)
- Keith Plunkett MHA (Peake)
- Jack Slater MHA (Gilles)

== House of Assembly ==
Sitting members are shown in bold text. Successful candidates are highlighted in the relevant colour. Where there is possible confusion, an asterisk (*) is also used.

Electorate	Held by	Labor candidate	Liberal candidate	Democrats candidate	CTA candidate	Other candidates
Adelaide	Labor	**Mike Duigan**	Michael Armitage	Peter Mann	Howard Shepherd	
Albert Park	Labor	**Kevin Hamilton**	Roger Hayes	Jim Mitchell		
Alexandra	Liberal	Jacqueline Horton	**Ted Chapman**	Judith Logan		
Baudin	Labor	**Don Hopgood**	Pamela Howard	Nicholas Wedge		Lyall McDonald (Ind)
Bragg	Liberal	Jennifer Richardson	**Graham Ingerson**	Margaret-Ann Williams		
Briggs	Labor	**Mike Rann**	Terry Stuart	Colin Maas		
Bright	Labor	**Derek Robertson**	Wayne Matthew	Ingrid O'Sullivan	Wayne Ellis	
Chaffey	Liberal	William Parsons	**Peter Arnold**	Mark Lobban		Rowland Beech (Ind)
Coles	Liberal	Rohan Claessen	**Jennifer Cashmore**	Pam Kelly		
Custance	Liberal	Charles Greeneklee	**John Olsen**	Harm Folkers	Bruce Slee	Grantley Siviour (Nat)
Davenport	Liberal	Bruce Whyatt	**Stan Evans**	Judy Smith		Lorraine Foster (Ind)
Elizabeth	Independent	Catherine Watkins	Peter Bates	Stephen Perkins	David Griffiths	**Martyn Evans** (Ind); Arnold Ollivier (Ind)
Eyre	Liberal	Gregory Giddens	**Graham Gunn**	Jack Babbage		Jillian Anderson (Nat)
Fisher	Labor	**Philip Tyler**	Bob Such	Terry Clark	John Watson	Alison Kent (Ind)
Flinders	National	Terrence Krieg	Kieran Kelly	Trevor Blood		**Peter Blacker** (Nat)
Florey	Labor	**Bob Gregory**	Richard Luther	Steve Bartholomew	Cathryn Linedale	Deborah Moran (Ind)
Gilles	Labor	Colin McKee	Steven Beardon	Stephen Swift		
Goyder	Liberal	Brenton Walker	**John Meier**	Derek Emery		
Hanson	Liberal	Ian Peak	**Heini Becker**	Mary McEwen		
Hartley	Labor	**Terry Groom**	Joe Scalzi	Arlyn Tombleson		
Hayward	Labor	**June Appleby**	Mark Brindal	Elizabeth Williams	Reg Macey	Mary Down (Ind)
Henley Beach	Labor	**Don Ferguson**	Bob Randall	Keith Lees	Peter Thompson	
Heysen	Liberal	Jillian Bromley	**David Wotton**	Merilyn Pedrick		
Kavel	Liberal	Warren Smith	**Roger Goldsworthy**	Michel Francis	Graeme Watts	
Light	Liberal	Tony Piccolo	**Bruce Eastick**	John Joyes	Theodor Stiller	Eric Gerlach (Ind)
Mawson	Labor	**Susan Lenehan**	Craig Spencer	Dennis Dorney		
Mitcham	Liberal	Timothy Campbell	**Stephen Baker**	Matthew Greenwood		
Mitchell	Labor	Paul Holloway	Darryl Parslow	Sue Ann Carver		
Morphett	Liberal	Trevor Peikert	**John Oswald**	Rosalina Bouchee		
Mount Gambier	Liberal	Brenton Lynch	**Harold Allison**	Glenn Taylor	Johannes Bastiaens	
Murray-Mallee	Liberal	Jane Milek	**Peter Lewis**	Jeannette Jolley		Douglas Lindley (Nat)
Napier	Labor	**Terry Hemmings**	Rilda Sharp	William Adams		
Newland	Labor	**Di Gayler**	Dorothy Kotz	Patrick Kavanagh	Dennis Brown	
Norwood	Labor	**Greg Crafter**	Robert Jackson	Cathi Tucker-Lee	Belle Harris	Alison Cox (Ind)
Peake	Labor	Vic Heron	Darcy Constantine	Stephen Crabbe	Terry Lear	Philippa Skinner (Soc.)
Playford	Labor	John Quirke	Peter Panagaris	Andrew Sickerdick		
Price	Labor	**Murray De Laine**	Bernice Pfitzner	Martin Kay		
Ramsay	Labor	**Lynn Arnold**	Brenda Bates	Shylie Holden		
Ross Smith	Labor	**John Bannon**	Christopher Pyne	Brian Fain		
Semaphore	Independent	Kevin Foley	Terence Daviess	Eric Mack		**Norm Peterson** (Ind)
Spence	Labor	Michael Atkinson	Rod Scarborough	Brian O'Leary	Catherine Sparrow	Florence Pens (Grey); Dennis White (Soc.)
Stuart	Labor	Colleen Hutchison	Simon Dawson	Kaye Matthews	David Squirrell	Joy Baluch (Ind)
Todd	Labor	**John Klunder**	Ernest Harders de Braconier	David Ball	Tom Curnow	
Unley	Labor	**Kym Mayes**	Joy Nimon	Mark Basham	David Peake	Jennie Williams (Ind)
Victoria	Liberal	Ray Tunks	**Dale Baker**	Johannes Cullen		
Walsh	Labor	**John Trainer**	Douglas Rowe	Richard Bennett		
Whyalla	Labor	**Frank Blevins**	Naomi Perry	Rosemary Gloede		George Crowe (Ind)

== Legislative Council ==
Sitting members are shown in bold text. Tickets that elected at least one MLC are highlighted in the relevant colour. Successful candidates are identified by an asterisk (*). Eleven seats were up for election. Labor were defending five seats. The Liberals were defending five seats. The Democrats were defending one seat.

Labor candidates	Liberal candidates	Democrats candidates	Nationals SA candidates	CTA candidates	Grey Power candidates
1. **Chris Sumner***; 2. **Anne Levy***; 3. **Mario Feleppa***; 4. **George Weatherill***; 5. **Ron Roberts***; 6. Bill Hender; 7. Janine Hanckel	1. **Rob Lucas***; 2. **Martin Cameron***; 3. **Diana Laidlaw***; 4. **Peter Dunn***; 5. **Julian Stefani***; 6. Maureen Andrews; 7. George Mercer	1. **Ian Gilfillan***; 2. Sandra Kanck; 3. Graham Pamount; 4. Phillip Druce; 5. Kenneth Farmer; 6. Patricia Shortridge	1. Terry Mullan; 2. Donald Hunt; 3. Stuart Robinson	1. Stewart Leggett; 2. Robert Brown; 3. Peter Frogley	1. Don Jessop; 2. Jack Holder
Conservative candidates	Ungrouped candidates				
1. Keith Tidswell; 2. John Horgan; 3. James Atkinson	Bob Lamb; Anastasios Giannouklas; Max Tatnell				
