= Members of the South Australian House of Assembly, 1989–1993 =

This is a list of members of the South Australian House of Assembly from 1989 to 1993, as elected at the 1989 state election:

Name	Party	Electorate	Term of office
Hon Harold Allison	Liberal	Mount Gambier	1975–1997
Dr Michael Armitage	Liberal	Adelaide	1989–2002
Hon Peter Arnold	Liberal	Chaffey	1968–1970, 1973–1993
Hon Lynn Arnold	Labor	Ramsay	1979–1994
Michael Atkinson	Labor	Spence	1989–2018
Dale Baker	Liberal	Victoria	1985–1997
Stephen Baker	Liberal	Mitcham	1982–1997
Hon John Bannon	Labor	Ross Smith	1977–1993
Heini Becker	Liberal	Hanson	1970–1997
Peter Blacker	National	Flinders	1973–1993
Frank Blevins	Labor	Giles	1985–1997
Mark Brindal	Liberal	Hayward	1989–2006
Hon Dean Brown ^{[3]}	Liberal	Alexandra	1973–1985, 1992–2006
Hon Jennifer Cashmore	Liberal	Coles	1977–1993
Hon Ted Chapman ^{[3]}	Liberal	Alexandra	1973–1992
Greg Crafter	Labor	Norwood	1979, 1980–1993
Murray De Laine	Labor	Price	1985–2002
Hon Bruce Eastick	Liberal	Light	1970–1993
Martyn Evans	Independent/Labor ^{[5]}	Elizabeth	1984–1994
Stan Evans	Liberal	Davenport	1968–1993
Don Ferguson	Labor	Henley Beach	1982–1993
Roger Goldsworthy ^{[4]}	Liberal	Kavel	1970–1992
Bob Gregory	Labor	Florey	1982–1993
Terry Groom	Labor/Independent ^{[2]}	Hartley	1977–1979, 1982–1993
Graham Gunn	Liberal	Eyre	1970–2010
Kevin Hamilton	Labor	Albert Park	1979–1993
Terry Hemmings	Labor	Napier	1977–1993
Vic Heron	Labor	Peake	1989–1993
Paul Holloway	Labor	Mitchell	1989–1993
Hon Dr Don Hopgood	Labor	Baudin	1970–1993
Colleen Hutchison	Labor	Stuart	1989–1993
Graham Ingerson	Liberal	Bragg	1983–2002
John Klunder	Labor	Todd	1977–1979, 1982–1993
Dorothy Kotz	Liberal	Newland	1989–2006
Susan Lenehan	Labor	Mawson	1982–1993
Peter Lewis	Liberal	Murray-Mallee	1979–2006
Wayne Matthew	Liberal	Bright	1989–2006
Kym Mayes	Labor	Unley	1982–1993
Colin McKee	Labor	Gilles	1989–1993
John Meier	Liberal	Goyder	1982–2006
John Olsen ^{[1]}^{[4]}	Liberal	Custance/Kavel ^{[1]}^{[4]}	1979–1990, 1992–2002
John Oswald	Liberal	Morphett	1979–2002
Norm Peterson	Independent	Semaphore	1979–1993
John Quirke	Labor	Playford	1989–1997
Mike Rann	Labor	Briggs	1985–2012
Bob Such	Liberal	Fisher	1989–2014
John Trainer	Labor	Walsh	1979–1993
Ivan Venning ^{[1]}	Liberal	Custance	1990–2014
Hon David Wotton	Liberal	Heysen	1975–2002

^{1} The Liberal member for Custance, John Olsen, resigned on 6 May 1990 to take up a casual vacancy in the Australian Senate. Liberal candidate Ivan Venning won the resulting by-election on 23 June.
^{2} The member for Hartley, Terry Groom, was elected as a Labor member, but resigned from the party in 1991 after losing preselection to recontest his seat at the 1993 election.
^{3} The Liberal member for Alexandra, Ted Chapman, resigned on 11 March 1992. Liberal candidate Dean Brown won the resulting by-election on 9 May.
^{4} The Liberal member for Kavel, Roger Goldsworthy, resigned on 8 April 1992. Liberal candidate John Olsen won the resulting by-election on 9 May.
^{5} The member for Elizabeth, Martyn Evans, was elected as an independent, but joined the Labor Party in late 1993.
