= Electoral results for the district of Eyre (South Australia) =

South Australian district election results

This is a list of election results for the Electoral district of Eyre in South Australian elections.

== Members for Eyre ==
Member	Party	Term
Arthur Christian	Liberal and Country	1938–1956
George Bockelberg	Liberal and Country	1956–1968
Ernie Edwards	Liberal and Country	1968–1970
Graham Gunn	Liberal and Country	1970–1974
Graham Gunn	Liberal	1974–1997

== Election results ==
=== Elections in the 1990s ===
1993 South Australian state election: Eyre
Party	Candidate	Votes	%	±%
Liberal	Graham Gunn	8,040	44.9	+8.2
Labor	Colleen Hutchison	6,375	35.6	−2.6
Independent	Joy Baluch	2,594	14.5	−0.8
Democrats	Jack Babbage	643	3.6	−2.2
Independent	Robert Court	245	1.4	+1.4
Total formal votes		17,897	97.8	+1.0
Informal votes		399	2.2	−1.0
Turnout		18,296	86.8	
Two-party-preferred result
Liberal	Graham Gunn	10,106	56.5	+4.3
Labor	Colleen Hutchison	7,791	43.5	−4.3
Liberal hold		Swing	+4.3	

=== Elections in the 1980s ===
1989 South Australian state election: Eyre
Party	Candidate	Votes	%	±%
Liberal	Graham Gunn	9,745	62.0	−1.8
Labor	Gregory Giddens	4,273	27.2	−4.6
Democrats	Jack Babbage	1,088	6.9	+2.5
National	Jillian Anderson	600	3.8	+3.8
Total formal votes		15,706	97.3	+1.7
Informal votes		435	2.7	−1.7
Turnout		16,141	89.2	+0.3
Two-party-preferred result
Liberal	Graham Gunn	10,777	68.6	+2.8
Labor	Gregory Giddens	4,929	31.4	−2.8
Liberal hold		Swing	+2.8	

1985 South Australian state election: Eyre
Party	Candidate	Votes	%	±%
Liberal	Graham Gunn	9,577	63.8	−0.2
Labor	Jennie Lee	4,781	31.8	−3.2
Democrats	Jillian Polkinghorne	656	4.4	+3.4
Total formal votes		15,014	95.6	
Informal votes		692	4.4	
Turnout		15,706	88.9	
Two-party-preferred result
Liberal	Graham Gunn	9,879	65.8	+0.8
Labor	Jennie Lee	5,135	34.2	−0.8
Liberal hold		Swing	+0.8	

1982 South Australian state election: Eyre
Party	Candidate	Votes	%	±%
Liberal	Graham Gunn	7,977	62.1	+2.2
Labor	Christina Phillis	4,862	37.9	−2.2
Total formal votes		12,839	92.7	−3.4
Informal votes		1,010	7.3	+3.4
Turnout		13,849	89.1	0.0
Liberal hold		Swing	+2.2	

=== Elections in the 1970s ===
1979 South Australian state election: Eyre
Party	Candidate	Votes	%	±%
Liberal	Graham Gunn	7,856	59.9	+6.4
Labor	Barry Piltz	5,250	40.1	+17.0
Total formal votes		13,106	96.1	−1.8
Informal votes		538	3.9	+1.8
Turnout		13,644	89.1	+0.3
Liberal hold		Swing	+6.4	

1977 South Australian state election: Eyre
Party	Candidate	Votes	%	±%
Liberal	Graham Gunn	7,259	53.5	−2.5
Labor	Michael Sachsse	3,179	23.4	−14.4
Labor	Barry Piltz	3,131	23.1	+23.1
Total formal votes		13,569	97.9	
Informal votes		296	2.1	
Turnout		13,865	88.8	
Two-party-preferred result
Liberal	Graham Gunn	7,589	55.9	−5.4
Labor	Michael Sachsse	5,980	44.1	+5.4
Liberal hold		Swing	−5.4	

1975 South Australian state election: Eyre
Party	Candidate	Votes	%	±%
Liberal	Graham Gunn	6,478	73.8	+1.2
Labor	David Uzzell	1,764	20.1	−7.3
National	William Hitchcock	532	6.1	+6.1
Total formal votes		8,774	97.4	+1.3
Informal votes		230	2.6	−1.3
Turnout		9,004	89.4	+0.7
Two-party-preferred result
Liberal	Graham Gunn	6,958	79.3	+6.7
Labor	David Uzzell	1,816	20.7	−6.7
Liberal hold		Swing	+6.7	

1973 South Australian state election: Eyre
Party	Candidate	Votes	%	±%
Liberal and Country	Graham Gunn	5,848	72.6	+16.5
Labor	Peter Kennedy	2,202	27.4	−5.8
Total formal votes		8,050	96.1	−1.5
Informal votes		327	3.9	+1.5
Turnout		8,377	88.7	−3.8
Liberal and Country hold		Swing	+6.9	

1970 South Australian state election: Eyre
Party	Candidate	Votes	%	±%
Liberal and Country	Graham Gunn	4,510	56.1	
Labor	Peter Kennedy	2,669	33.2	
National	Darrell Gillings	864	10.7	
Total formal votes		8,043	97.6	
Informal votes		193	2.3	
Turnout		8,236	92.5	
Two-party-preferred result
Liberal and Country	Graham Gunn	5,288	65.7	
Labor	Peter Kennedy	2,755	34.3	
Liberal and Country hold		Swing		

=== Elections in the 1960s ===
1968 South Australian state election: Eyre
Party	Candidate	Votes	%	±%
Liberal and Country	Ernie Edwards	3,292	45.4	−1.4
Independent	William Wilkins	1,883	26.0	+26.0
Labor	Jack Mortimer	1,306	18.0	−8.9
National	Morley Rodda	775	10.7	−15.7
Total formal votes		7,256	98.8	+0.4
Informal votes		89	1.2	−0.4
Turnout		7,345	96.0	+0.4
Two-candidate-preferred result
Liberal and Country	Ernie Edwards	3,987	54.9	−5.3
Independent	William Wilkins	3,269	45.1	+45.1
Liberal and Country hold		Swing	N/A	

1965 South Australian state election: Eyre
Party	Candidate	Votes	%	±%
Liberal and Country	George Bockelberg	3,206	46.8	−53.2
Labor	Isaac Rayson	1,843	26.9	+26.9
National	Harold Schiller	1,806	26.4	+26.4
Total formal votes		6,855	98.4	
Informal votes		110	1.6	
Turnout		6,965	95.6	
Two-party-preferred result
Liberal and Country	George Bockelberg	4,130	60.2	−39.8
Labor	Isaac Rayson	2,725	39.8	+39.8
Liberal and Country hold		Swing	N/A	

1962 South Australian state election: Eyre
Party	Candidate	Votes	%	±%
Liberal and Country	George Bockelberg	unopposed		
Liberal and Country hold		Swing		

=== Elections in the 1950s ===
1959 South Australian state election: Eyre
Party	Candidate	Votes	%	±%
Liberal and Country	George Bockelberg	unopposed		
Liberal and Country hold		Swing		

1956 South Australian state election: Eyre
Party	Candidate	Votes	%	±%
Liberal and Country	George Bockelberg	3,498	55.9	
Independent	Herbert Hogan	1,793	28.6	
Independent	George Simpson	970	15.5	
Total formal votes		6,261	98.4	
Informal votes		100	1.6	
Turnout		9,361	93.4	
Liberal and Country hold		Swing		

- Preferences were not distributed.

1953 South Australian state election: Eyre
Party	Candidate	Votes	%	±%
Liberal and Country	Arthur Christian	3,194	67.8	−32.2
Independent	Herbert Hogan	1,519	32.2	+32.2
Total formal votes		4,713	97.9	
Informal votes		102	2.1	
Turnout		4,815	94.7	
Liberal and Country hold		Swing	N/A	

1950 South Australian state election: Eyre
Party	Candidate	Votes	%	±%
Liberal and Country	Arthur Christian	unopposed		
Liberal and Country hold		Swing		

=== Elections in the 1940s ===
1947 South Australian state election: Eyre
Party	Candidate	Votes	%	±%
Liberal and Country	Arthur Christian	unopposed		
Liberal and Country hold		Swing		

1944 South Australian state election: Eyre
Party	Candidate	Votes	%	±%
Liberal and Country	Arthur Christian	2,618	59.9	−6.1
Labor	William Gosling	1,193	27.3	+27.3
Independent	Oliver Eatts	560	12.8	+12.8
Total formal votes		4,371	96.5	−1.4
Informal votes		157	3.5	+1.4
Turnout		4,528	88.0	+39.2
Liberal and Country hold		Swing	N/A	

1941 South Australian state election: Eyre
Party	Candidate	Votes	%	±%
Liberal and Country	Arthur Christian	1,839	66.0	+15.4
Independent	James Moore	949	34.0	+34.0
Total formal votes		2,788	97.9	+1.0
Informal votes		59	2.1	−1.0
Turnout		2,847	48.8	−14.7
Liberal and Country hold		Swing	N/A	

=== Elections in the 1930s ===
1938 South Australian state election: Eyre
Party	Candidate	Votes	%	±%
Liberal and Country	Arthur Christian	1,869	50.6	
Independent	Arnold Schubert	994	26.9	
Independent	Carl Bohlin	831	22.5	
Total formal votes		3,694	96.9	
Informal votes		118	3.1	
Turnout		3,812	63.5	
Liberal and Country hold		Swing		

- Preferences were not distributed.
