= Electoral results for the district of Bright =

South Australian district election results

This is a list of electoral results for the Electoral district of Bright in South Australian state elections.

== Members for Bright ==
| Member | Party | Term |
|---|---|---|
| Derek Robertson | Labor | 1985–1989 |
| Wayne Matthew | Liberal | 1989–2006 |
| Chloë Fox | Labor | 2006–2014 |
| David Speirs | Liberal | 2014–2018 |

== Election results ==
=== Elections in the 2010s ===
2014 South Australian state election: Bright
| Party | Candidate | Votes | % | ±% |
|---|---|---|---|---|
| Liberal | David Speirs | 10,780 | 48.5 | +4.6 |
| Labor | Chloë Fox | 8,491 | 38.2 | −4.0 |
| Greens | Jamie Ryan | 2,081 | 9.4 | +1.5 |
| Family First | Steve Price | 852 | 3.8 | +0.9 |
| Total formal votes | | 22,204 | 97.8 | +0.8 |
| Informal votes | | 488 | 2.2 | −0.8 |
| Turnout | | 22,692 | 93.1 | −0.4 |
Two-party-preferred result
| Liberal | David Speirs | 11,829 | 53.3 | +3.7 |
| Labor | Chloë Fox | 10,375 | 46.7 | −3.7 |
| Liberal gain from Labor | | Swing | +3.7 | |

2010 South Australian state election: Bright
| Party | Candidate | Votes | % | ±% |
|---|---|---|---|---|
| Liberal | Maria Kourtesis | 9,415 | 44.0 | +6.6 |
| Labor | Chloë Fox | 9,022 | 42.2 | −5.4 |
| Greens | Graham Goss | 1,669 | 7.8 | +0.9 |
| Family First | Kevin Cramp | 601 | 2.8 | −1.3 |
| Save the RAH | Meredith Stock | 298 | 1.4 | +1.4 |
| Fair Land Tax | Nick Kalogiannis | 194 | 0.9 | +0.9 |
| Independent | Shane Roos | 188 | 0.9 | +0.9 |
| Total formal votes | | 21,387 | 96.9 | |
| Informal votes | | 641 | 3.1 | |
| Turnout | | 22,028 | 93.4 | |
Two-party-preferred result
| Labor | Chloë Fox | 10,777 | 50.4 | −6.2 |
| Liberal | Maria Kourtesis | 10,610 | 49.6 | +6.2 |
| Labor hold | | Swing | −6.2 | |

=== Elections in the 2000s ===
2006 South Australian state election: Bright
| Party | Candidate | Votes | % | ±% |
|---|---|---|---|---|
| Labor | Chloë Fox | 10,126 | 50.2 | +16.9 |
| Liberal | Angus Redford | 6,949 | 34.4 | −10.2 |
| Greens | Allan Robins | 1,315 | 6.5 | +1.8 |
| Family First | Andrew Cole | 905 | 4.5 | +1.6 |
| Dignity for Disabled | Trevor Pyatt | 492 | 2.4 | +2.4 |
| Democrats | Caroline Siow | 395 | 2.0 | −6.2 |
| Total formal votes | | 20,182 | 97.1 | +0.2 |
| Informal votes | | 600 | 2.9 | −0.2 |
| Turnout | | 20,782 | 92.6 | −1.5 |
Two-party-preferred result
| Labor | Chloë Fox | 11,983 | 59.4 | +14.4 |
| Liberal | Angus Redford | 8,199 | 40.6 | −14.4 |
| Labor gain from Liberal | | Swing | +14.4 | |

2002 South Australian state election: Bright
| Party | Candidate | Votes | % | ±% |
|---|---|---|---|---|
| Liberal | Wayne Matthew | 9,086 | 44.6 | −1.0 |
| Labor | Ron Baronian | 6,784 | 33.3 | +1.3 |
| Democrats | Fiona Blinco | 1,672 | 8.2 | −12.8 |
| Greens | Bob Darlington | 961 | 4.7 | +4.7 |
| Family First | Vasiliki Savvas | 593 | 2.9 | +2.9 |
| SA First | Kathy Williams | 476 | 2.3 | +2.3 |
| One Nation | Laurel Payne | 403 | 2.0 | +2.0 |
| Independent | Cheryl Connor | 390 | 1.9 | +1.9 |
| Total formal votes | | 20,365 | 96.9 | |
| Informal votes | | 657 | 3.1 | |
| Turnout | | 21,022 | 94.1 | |
Two-party-preferred result
| Liberal | Wayne Matthew | 11,192 | 55.0 | +0.6 |
| Labor | Ron Baronian | 9,173 | 45.0 | −0.6 |
| Liberal hold | | Swing | +0.6 | |

=== Elections in the 1990s ===
1997 South Australian state election: Bright
| Party | Candidate | Votes | % | ±% |
|---|---|---|---|---|
| Liberal | Wayne Matthew | 9,153 | 47.4 | −15.9 |
| Labor | Kathy Williams | 5,910 | 30.6 | +5.9 |
| Democrats | Fiona Blinco | 4,263 | 22.1 | +10.1 |
| Total formal votes | | 19,326 | 96.3 | −1.6 |
| Informal votes | | 743 | 3.7 | +1.6 |
| Turnout | | 20,069 | 92.6 | |
Two-party-preferred result
| Liberal | Wayne Matthew | 10,844 | 56.1 | −12.2 |
| Labor | Kathy Williams | 8,482 | 43.9 | +12.2 |
| Liberal hold | | Swing | −12.2 | |

1993 South Australian state election: Bright
| Party | Candidate | Votes | % | ±% |
|---|---|---|---|---|
| Liberal | Wayne Matthew | 12,573 | 64.0 | +18.0 |
| Labor | Aileen Braun | 4,711 | 24.0 | −16.7 |
| Democrats | Fiona Blinco | 2,358 | 12.0 | +1.1 |
| Total formal votes | | 19,642 | 97.9 | −0.4 |
| Informal votes | | 424 | 2.1 | +0.4 |
| Turnout | | 20,066 | 95.0 | |
Two-party-preferred result
| Liberal | Wayne Matthew | 13,547 | 69.0 | +16.6 |
| Labor | Aileen Braun | 6,095 | 31.0 | −16.6 |
| Liberal hold | | Swing | +16.6 | |

=== Elections in the 1980s ===
1989 South Australian state election: Bright
| Party | Candidate | Votes | % | ±% |
|---|---|---|---|---|
| Liberal | Wayne Matthew | 8,911 | 44.8 | −2.0 |
| Labor | Derek Robertson | 8,345 | 41.9 | −7.6 |
| Democrats | Ingrid O'Sullivan | 2,223 | 11.2 | +7.5 |
| Call to Australia | Wayne Ellis | 417 | 2.1 | +2.1 |
| Total formal votes | | 19,896 | 98.0 | +0.1 |
| Informal votes | | 408 | 2.0 | −0.1 |
| Turnout | | 20,304 | 95.8 | +0.5 |
Two-party-preferred result
| Liberal | Wayne Matthew | 10,139 | 51.0 | +2.6 |
| Labor | Derek Robertson | 9,757 | 49.0 | −2.6 |
| Liberal gain from Labor | | Swing | +2.6 | |

1985 South Australian state election: Bright
| Party | Candidate | Votes | % | ±% |
|---|---|---|---|---|
| Labor | Derek Robertson | 9,048 | 49.5 | +3.5 |
| Liberal | John Mathwin | 8,569 | 46.8 | −0.1 |
| Democrats | Fred Cannon | 674 | 3.7 | −3.3 |
| Total formal votes | | 18,291 | 97.9 | |
| Informal votes | | 390 | 2.1 | |
| Turnout | | 18,681 | 95.3 | |
Two-party-preferred result
| Labor | Derek Robertson | 9,430 | 51.6 | +2.6 |
| Liberal | John Mathwin | 8,861 | 48.4 | −2.6 |
| Labor gain from Liberal | | Swing | +2.6 | |
