= 1989 South Australian state election =

- 25 November 1989

All 47 seats in the South Australian House of Assembly 24 seats were needed for a majority 11 (of the 22) seats in the South Australian Legislative Council
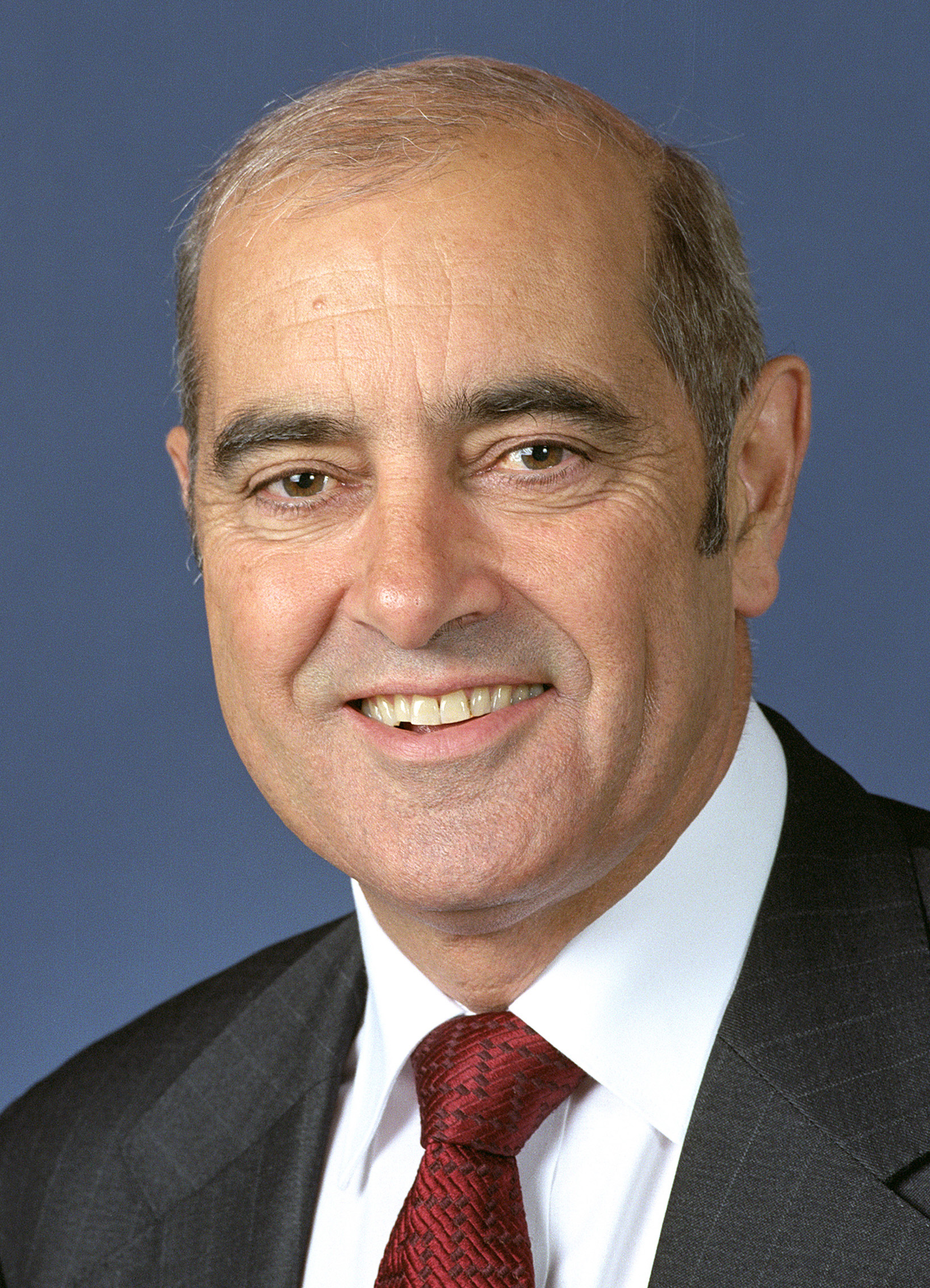

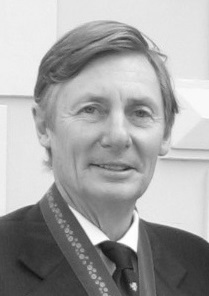
	First party	Second party	Third party
			NAT
Leader	John Olsen	John Bannon	Peter Blacker
Party	Liberal	Labor	National
Leader since	10 November 1982	18 September 1979
Leader's seat	Custance	Ross Smith	Flinders
Seats before	17	27	1
Seats won	22	22	1
Seat change	▲5	▼5	Steady
Popular vote	381,834	346,268	10,217
Percentage	44.21%	40.09%	1.18%
Swing	▲2.06	▼8.10	▼0.54
TPP	52.0%	48.0%
TPP swing	▲5.21	▼5.21
Premier before election
John Bannon
Labor
Resulting Premier
John Bannon
Labor

State elections were held in South Australia on 25 November 1989. All 47 seats in the South Australian House of Assembly were up for election. The incumbent Australian Labor Party led by Premier of South Australia John Bannon defeated the Liberal Party of Australia led by Leader of the Opposition John Olsen. Labor won 22 out of 47 seats, and secured a majority of 24 with the support of two Independent Labor members.

== Background ==
Parliamentary elections for both houses of the Parliament of South Australia were held in South Australia in 1989. John Bannon's Labor government had initially presided over an economic boom, but at the time of the election the economy had slowed due to the late 1980s recession. The Liberals' campaign accused Bannon of inaction during the poor economic conditions, capitalising on the fact that he was national president of Australian Labor Party at the time.

== Outcome ==
The Liberals gained five seats (Adelaide, Bright, Fisher, Hayward and Newland), but Labor held power with of the support of the two "independent Labor" members.

The John Olsen-led Liberal Party of Australia failed to win office despite gaining 52 percent of the two-party vote.

It was only the second time that a Labor government in South Australia had been re-elected for a third term, however it would be the first eleven-year-incumbent Labor government.

In the South Australian Legislative Council, the numbers were unchanged (Labor 10, Liberal 10, Australian Democrats 2). Thus the Democrats retained sole balance of power. They had held sole balance of power since 1985, and would continue to hold it until 1997.

== Aftermath ==
Before the election, the Liberal Party made allegations of a Labor 'gerrymander', due to the perceived unfair state of the electoral boundaries. While Labor had not instituted any type of imbalanced electoral legislation, it had nonetheless not issued a redistribution since 1983 (which it was not required to do, because redistributions were only required after every third election). So while the electoral districts were equal within the required 10 percent tolerances when they were drawn in 1983, population shifts had increased that imbalance substantially. Because of this, a 1991 state referendum made redistributions mandatory by the Electoral Commission of South Australia after each election, and included a 'fairness clause' where the commission should redraw boundaries with the objective that the party which receives over 50 percent of the statewide two-party vote at the forthcoming election should win the two-party vote in a majority of seats.

Olsen was replaced as Liberal leader by Dale Baker in 1990. Baker resigned as leader in 1992 without contesting an election, and the subsequent leadership ballot was won by Dean Brown, ahead of Olsen and Jennifer Cashmore.

The parliament had three by-elections (1990 Custance by-election, the 1992 Alexandra by-election and the 1992 Kavel by-election), but all were retained by the Liberal party, so resulted in no change in the numbers in parliament.

Independent Labor Martyn Evans joined the ALP in 1993 and stood at the 1993 election as an endorsed ALP candidate.

== Key dates ==
- Issue of writ: 29 October 1989
- Close of electoral rolls: 6 November 1989
- Close of nominations: Friday 10 November 1989, at noon
- Polling day: 25 November 1989
- Return of writ: On or before 18 December 1989

== Results ==
=== House of Assembly ===
South Australian state election, 25 November 1989 House of Assembly << 1985–1993 >>
Enrolled voters	941,368				
Votes cast	888,918		Turnout	94.43	+0.97
Informal votes	25,167		Informal	2.83	+0.64
Summary of votes by party
Party	Primary votes	%	Swing	Seats	Change
Liberal	381,834	44.21	+2.06	22	+ 5
Labor	346,268	40.09	–8.10	22	– 5
Democrats	88,270	10.27	+6.02	0	0
Call to Australia	10,974	1.30	+1.30	0	0
National	10,217	1.18	–0.54	1	0
Independent Labor	13,094	1.52	–0.77	2	0
Independent	10,633	1.23	+0.57	0	0
Other	2,011	0.23	*	0	0
Total	863,751			47	
Two-party-preferred
Labor	414,246	47.96	–5.21		
Liberal	449,505	52.04	+5.21		

=== Seats changing hands ===
Seat	Pre-1989			Swing	Post-1989		
Seat	Party	Member	Margin	Swing	Margin	Member	Party
Adelaide	Labor	Mike Duigan	0.6	3.9	3.3	Michael Armitage	Liberal
Bright	Labor	Derek Robertson	1.6	2.6	1.0	Wayne Matthew	Liberal
Davenport	Independent	Stan Evans*	2.6	N/A	15.9	Stan Evans	Liberal
Fisher	Labor	Philip Tyler	1.1	4.2	3.1	Bob Such	Liberal
Hayward	Labor	June Appleby	2.8	3.7	0.9	Mark Brindal	Liberal
Newland	Labor	Di Gayler	1.5	1.6	0.1	Dorothy Kotz	Liberal

- Stan Evans was elected at the 1985 election as an Independent. He joined the Liberal Party shortly afterward and retained the seat of Davenport as a Liberal.

=== Legislative Council ===
South Australian state election, 25 November 1989 Legislative Council << 1985–1993 >>
Enrolled voters	941,368				
Votes cast	889,896		Turnout	94.5%	+1.0%
Informal votes	34,612		Informal	3.9%	+0.2%
Summary of votes by party
Party	Primary votes	%	Swing	Seats won	Seats held
Liberal	351,559	41.1%	+1.8%	5	10
Labor	339,961	39.7%	–8.3%	5	10
Democrats	91,456	10.7%	+5.2%	1	2
Call to Australia	21,658	2.5%	–0.5%	0	0
Grey Power	19,486	2.3%	+2.3%	0	0
Conservative	7,657	0.9%	+0.9%	0	0
National	6,700	0.8%	–0.8%	0	0
Independent	16,807	2.0%	+0.9%	0	0
Total	855,284			11	22

== Post-election pendulum ==
Government seats (24)
Marginal
Florey	Bob Gregory	ALP	1.8%
Unley	Kym Mayes	ALP	2.3%
Norwood	Greg Crafter	ALP	2.5%
Todd	John Klunder	ALP	2.8%
Henley Beach	Don Ferguson	ALP	4.0%
Mitchell	Paul Holloway	ALP	4.3%
Hartley	Terry Groom	ALP	4.5%
Baudin	Don Hopgood	ALP	5.1%
Fairly safe
Walsh	John Trainer	ALP	6.3%
Gilles	Colin McKee	ALP	6.6%
Mawson	Susan Lenehan	ALP	7.3%
Albert Park	Kevin Hamilton	ALP	8.1%
Playford	John Quirke	ALP	9.1%
Peake	Vic Heron	ALP	10.0%
Safe
Whyalla	Frank Blevins	ALP	10.9%
Briggs	Mike Rann	ALP	11.8%
Semaphore	Norm Peterson	IND	12.8% v ALP
Spence	Michael Atkinson	ALP	14.0%
Ross Smith	John Bannon	ALP	14.1%
Price	Murray De Laine	ALP	16.3%
Ramsay	Lynn Arnold	ALP	16.7%
Elizabeth	Martyn Evans	IND	17.1% v ALP
Napier	Terry Hemmings	ALP	17.2%
Stuart	Colleen Hutchison	ALP	18.0%

Opposition seats (23)
Marginal
Newland	Dorothy Kotz	LIB	0.1%
Hayward	Mark Brindal	LIB	0.9%
Bright	Wayne Matthew	LIB	1.0%
Fisher	Bob Such	LIB	3.1%
Adelaide	Michael Armitage	LIB	3.3%
Fairly safe
Hanson	Heini Becker	LIB	6.1%
Morphett	John Oswald	LIB	10.0%
Safe
Flinders	Peter Blacker	NAT	10.9% v LIB
Mitcham	Stephen Baker	LIB	11.0%
Light	Bruce Eastick	LIB	12.9%
Coles	Jennifer Cashmore	LIB	13.1%
Heysen	David Wotton	LIB	15.1%
Kavel	Roger Goldsworthy	LIB	15.5%
Davenport	Stan Evans	LIB	15.9%
Alexandra	Ted Chapman	LIB	16.0%
Goyder	John Meier	LIB	16.4%
Eyre	Graham Gunn	LIB	18.6%
Bragg	Graham Ingerson	LIB	20.0%
Custance	John Olsen	LIB	20.1%
Chaffey	Peter Arnold	LIB	20.7%
Mount Gambier	Harold Allison	LIB	22.5%
Murray-Mallee	Peter Lewis	LIB	22.6%
Victoria	Dale Baker	LIB	23.2%

== See also ==
- Candidates of the South Australian state election, 1989
- Results of the South Australian state election, 1989 (House of Assembly)
- Results of the 1989 South Australian state election (Legislative Council)
- Members of the South Australian House of Assembly, 1989-1993
- Members of the South Australian Legislative Council, 1989-1993
