= Electoral results for the district of Spence =

South Australian district election results

This is a list of electoral results for the Spence in South Australian elections.

== Members for Spence ==
Member	Party	Term
Ernie Crimes	Labor	1970–1975
Roy Abbott	Labor	1975–1989
Michael Atkinson	Labor	1989–2002

== Election results ==
=== Elections in the 1990s ===
1997 South Australian state election: Spence
Party	Candidate	Votes	%	±%
Labor	Michael Atkinson	11,806	64.8	+14.8
Liberal	Alex Smith	4,063	22.3	−16.5
Democrats	Danny Grimsey	2,339	12.8	+5.1
Total formal votes		18,208	96.0	−0.1
Informal votes		768	4.0	+0.1
Turnout		18,976	90.9	
Two-party-preferred result
Labor	Michael Atkinson	13,340	73.3	+15.6
Liberal	Alex Smith	4,868	26.7	−15.6
Labor hold		Swing	+15.6	

1993 South Australian state election: Spence
Party	Candidate	Votes	%	±%
Labor	Michael Atkinson	9,542	50.0	−5.7
Liberal	Danny McGuire	7,411	38.8	+12.0
Democrats	Jim Sotirianakos	1,483	7.8	+0.1
Natural Law	Athena Yiossis	649	3.4	+3.4
Total formal votes		19,085	96.1	+2.0
Informal votes		784	3.9	−2.0
Turnout		19,869	92.9	
Two-party-preferred result
Labor	Michael Atkinson	11,016	57.7	−6.4
Liberal	Danny McGuire	8,069	42.3	+6.4
Labor hold		Swing	−6.4	

=== Elections in the 1980s ===
1989 South Australian state election: Spence
Party	Candidate	Votes	%	±%
Labor	Michael Atkinson	9,762	55.3	−9.5
Liberal	Rodney Scarborough	4,668	26.4	−3.4
Democrats	Brian O'Leary	1,350	7.6	+2.2
Grey Power	Florence Pens	1,275	7.2	+7.2
Socialist Alliance	Dennis White	314	1.8	+1.8
Call to Australia	Catherine Sparrow	290	1.7	+1.7
Total formal votes		17,659	94.1	−1.9
Informal votes		1,103	5.9	+1.9
Turnout		18,762	93.9	+0.6
Two-party-preferred result
Labor	Michael Atkinson	11,298	64.0	−4.4
Liberal	Rodney Scarborough	6,361	36.0	+4.4
Labor hold		Swing	−4.4	

1985 South Australian state election: Spence
Party	Candidate	Votes	%	±%
Labor	Roy Abbott	11,349	64.8	−6.2
Liberal	Joe Ryan	5,231	29.8	+2.9
Democrats	Elizabeth Sanderson	942	5.4	+3.4
Total formal votes		17,522	96.0	
Informal votes		727	4.0	
Turnout		18,249	93.3	
Two-party-preferred result
Labor	Roy Abbott	11,978	68.4	−3.6
Liberal	Joe Ryan	5,544	31.6	+3.6
Labor hold		Swing	−3.6	

1982 South Australian state election: Spence
Party	Candidate	Votes	%	±%
Labor	Roy Abbott	9,866	77.9	+7.7
Liberal	Elizabeth Bronisz	2,803	22.1	−7.7
Total formal votes		12,669	89.6	−4.0
Informal votes		1,469	10.4	+4.0
Turnout		14,138	92.8	0.0
Labor hold		Swing	+7.7	

=== Elections in the 1970s ===
1979 South Australian state election: Spence
Party	Candidate	Votes	%	±%
Labor	Roy Abbott	9,502	70.2	−7.1
Liberal	Barry Lewis	4,027	29.8	+7.1
Total formal votes		13,529	93.6	−2.1
Informal votes		932	6.4	+2.1
Turnout		14,461	92.8	−0.3
Labor hold		Swing	−7.1	

1977 South Australian state election: Spence
Party	Candidate	Votes	%	±%
Labor	Roy Abbott	11,307	77.3	+6.3
Liberal	George Basivovs	3,316	22.7	+6.4
Total formal votes		14,623	95.7	
Informal votes		658	4.3	
Turnout		15,281	93.1	
Labor hold		Swing	+4.4	

1975 South Australian state election: Spence
Party	Candidate	Votes	%	±%
Labor	Roy Abbott	10,364	71.0	−10.9
Liberal	Anthony Hutton	2,386	16.4	+16.4
Liberal Movement	Patrick Carlin	1,844	12.6	+12.6
Total formal votes		14,594	94.1	+1.4
Informal votes		921	5.9	−1.4
Turnout		15,515	93.0	−1.8
Two-party-preferred result
Labor	Roy Abbott	10,551	72.3	−9.6
Liberal	Anthony Hutton	4,043	27.7	+27.7
Labor hold		Swing	N/A	

1973 South Australian state election: Spence
Party	Candidate	Votes	%	±%
Labor	Ernie Crimes	11,363	81.9	+6.2
Independent	James Sheridan	2,508	18.1	+18.1
Total formal votes		13,871	92.7	−4.5
Informal votes		1,098	7.3	+4.5
Turnout		14,969	94.8	−0.5
Labor hold		Swing	N/A	

1970 South Australian state election: Spence
Party	Candidate	Votes	%	±%
Labor	Ernie Crimes	11,116	75.7	
Liberal and Country	Frank Rieck	3,569	24.3	
Total formal votes		14,685	97.2	
Informal votes		424	2.8	
Turnout		15,109	95.3	
Labor hold		Swing		
