= Electoral results for the district of Gilles =

South Australian district election results

This is a list of election results for the Electoral district of Gilles in South Australian elections.

== Members for Gilles ==
Member	Party	Term
Jack Slater	Labor	1970–1989
Colin McKee	Labor	1989–1993

== Election results ==
=== Elections in the 1980s ===
1989 South Australian state election: Gilles
Party	Candidate	Votes	%	±%
Labor	Colin McKee	8,177	49.8	−10.8
Liberal	Steven Beardon	6,090	37.1	+4.1
Democrats	Stephen Swift	2,156	13.1	+6.7
Total formal votes		16,423	96.6	+0.2
Informal votes		570	3.4	−0.2
Turnout		16,993	95.3	+0.9
Two-party-preferred result
Labor	Colin McKee	9,293	56.6	−7.6
Liberal	Steven Beardon	7,130	43.4	+7.6
Labor hold		Swing	−7.6	

1985 South Australian state election: Gilles
Party	Candidate	Votes	%	±%
Labor	Jack Slater	10,083	60.6	+3.6
Liberal	Lois Bell	5,492	33.0	0.0
Democrats	Brian Fain	1,072	6.4	−3.6
Total formal votes		16,647	96.4	
Informal votes		629	3.6	
Turnout		17,276	94.4	
Two-party-preferred result
Labor	Jack Slater	10,689	64.2	+2.2
Liberal	Lois Bell	5,958	35.8	−2.2
Labor hold		Swing	+2.2	

1982 South Australian state election: Gilles
Party	Candidate	Votes	%	±%
Labor	Jack Slater	8,120	55.3	+7.0
Liberal	Gregory Minuzzo	4,970	33.8	−4.9
Democrats	Eileen Farmer	1,597	10.9	−2.1
Total formal votes		14,687	92.6	−2.1
Informal votes		1,165	7.4	+2.1
Turnout		15,852	93.7	+0.1
Two-party-preferred result
Labor	Jack Slater	8,919	60.7	+5.3
Liberal	Gregory Minuzzo	5,768	39.3	−5.3
Labor hold		Swing	+5.3	

=== Elections in the 1970s ===
1979 South Australian state election: Gilles
Party	Candidate	Votes	%	±%
Labor	Jack Slater	7,489	48.3	−9.8
Liberal	Jodi Tabalotny	6,005	38.7	+8.2
Democrats	Eileen Farmer	2,010	13.0	+1.6
Total formal votes		15,504	94.7	−3.2
Informal votes		872	5.3	+3.2
Turnout		16,376	93.6	−0.1
Two-party-preferred result
Labor	Jack Slater	8,589	55.4	−7.2
Liberal	Jodi Tabalotny	6,915	44.6	+7.2
Labor hold		Swing	−7.2	

1977 South Australian state election: Gilles
Party	Candidate	Votes	%	±%
Labor	Jack Slater	9,339	58.1	+2.7
Liberal	Lois Bell	4,905	30.5	+7.5
Democrats	Andrew Graham	1,841	11.4	+11.4
Total formal votes		16,085	97.9	
Informal votes		350	2.1	
Turnout		16,435	93.7	
Two-party-preferred result
Labor	Jack Slater	10,101	62.8	+3.7
Liberal	Lois Bell	5,984	37.2	−3.7
Labor hold		Swing	+3.7	

1975 South Australian state election: Gilles
Party	Candidate	Votes	%	±%
Labor	Jack Slater	8,626	50.4	−5.4
Liberal	Louis Ravesi	4,333	25.3	−18.9
Liberal Movement	Norman Wilson	3,900	22.8	+22.8
National	Maxwell Clifton	265	1.5	+1.5
Total formal votes		17,124	95.5	−1.0
Informal votes		815	4.5	+1.0
Turnout		17,939	93.5	−1.3
Two-party-preferred result
Labor	Jack Slater	9,041	52.8	−3.0
Liberal	Louis Ravesi	8,083	47.2	+3.0
Labor hold		Swing	−3.0	

1973 South Australian state election: Gilles
Party	Candidate	Votes	%	±%
Labor	Jack Slater	8,846	55.8	+0.4
Liberal and Country	Donald Glazbrook	6,995	44.2	−0.4
Total formal votes		15,841	96.5	−1.7
Informal votes		574	3.5	+1.7
Turnout		16,415	94.8	−0.8
Labor hold		Swing	+0.4	

1970 South Australian state election: Gilles
Party	Candidate	Votes	%	±%
Labor	Jack Slater	8,186	55.4	
Liberal and Country	Donald Glazbrook	6,598	44.6	
Total formal votes		14,784	98.2	
Informal votes		264	1.8	
Turnout		15,048	95.6	
Labor hold		Swing		
