= Electoral results for the district of Custance =

South Australian district election results

This is a list of election results for the electoral district of Custance in South Australian elections.

== Members for Custance ==
Member	Party	Term
John Olsen	Liberal	1985–1990
Ivan Venning	Liberal	1990–1997

== Election results ==
=== Elections in the 1990s ===
1993 South Australian state election: Custance
Party	Candidate	Votes	%	±%
Liberal	Ivan Venning	13,550	69.8	+9.5
Labor	Ben Browne	3,716	19.1	−5.8
Democrats	Harm Folkers	1,517	7.8	+0.6
Grey Power	Eugene Rooney	643	3.3	+3.3
Total formal votes		19,426	97.4	−0.2
Informal votes		509	2.6	+0.2
Turnout		19,935	93.8	
Two-party-preferred result
Liberal	Ivan Venning	14,477	74.5	+4.7
Labor	Ben Browne	4,949	25.5	−4.7
Liberal hold		Swing	+4.7	

Custance state by-election, 23 June 1990
Party	Candidate	Votes	%	±%
Liberal	Ivan Venning	7,595	46.8	−14.8
Labor	Charles Greeneklee	3,801	23.4	−2.0
National	Grantley Siviour	2,964	18.3	+14.6
Democrats	David Clarke	1,174	7.2	+1.4
Call to Australia	Bruce Slee	698	4.3	+0.8
Total formal votes		16,232	97.6	+0.2
Informal votes		400	2.4	−0.2
Turnout		16,632	88.1	−6.9
Two-party-preferred result
Liberal	Ivan Venning	11,064	68.2	−2.0
Labor	Charles Greeneklee	5,168	31.8	+2.0
Liberal hold		Swing	−2.0	

=== Elections in the 1980s ===
1989 South Australian state election: Custance
Party	Candidate	Votes	%	±%
Liberal	John Olsen	10,525	61.6	−1.4
Labor	Charles Greeneklee	4,337	25.4	−5.6
Democrats	Harm Folkers	998	5.8	−0.2
National	Grantley Siviour	637	3.7	+3.7
Call to Australia	Bruce Slee	594	3.5	+3.5
Total formal votes		17,091	97.4	−0.2
Informal votes		454	2.6	+0.2
Turnout		17,545	95.0	−0.2
Two-party-preferred result
Liberal	John Olsen	11,983	70.1	+3.8
Labor	Charles Greeneklee	5,108	29.9	−3.8
Liberal hold		Swing	+3.8	

1985 South Australian state election: Custance
Party	Candidate	Votes	%	±%
Liberal	John Olsen	10,611	63.0	−1.0
Labor	Arthur Rich	5,236	31.0	+3.0
Democrats	John Smyth	1,010	6.0	+1.0
Total formal votes		16,857	97.6	
Informal votes		412	2.4	
Turnout		17,269	95.2	
Two-party-preferred result
Liberal	John Olsen	11,184	66.3	−3.7
Labor	Arthur Rich	5,673	33.7	+3.7
Liberal hold		Swing	−3.7	
