= Electoral results for the district of Schubert =

South Australian district election results

This is a list of electoral results for the Electoral district of Schubert in South Australian state elections.

== Members for Schubert ==
Member	Party	Term
Ivan Venning	Liberal	1997–2014
Stephan Knoll	Liberal	2014–2022
Ashton Hurn	Liberal	2022–present

== Election results ==
=== Elections in the 2020s ===
==== 2026 ====
2026 South Australian state election: Schubert
Party	Candidate	Votes	%	±%
Liberal	Ashton Hurn	12,515	47.0	−4.4
One Nation	Bruce Preece	6,079	22.8	+16.0
Labor	James Rothe	5,352	20.1	−2.6
Greens	Beverley Morris	1,855	7.0	−3.2
Animal Justice	Alice Shore	420	1.6	+1.6
Australian Family	Matt Williams	297	1.1	+1.1
Fair Go	David Duncan	108	0.4	+0.4
Total formal votes		26,626	97.1	+0.9
Informal votes		790	2.9	−0.9
Turnout		27,416	93.4	+0.7
Two-candidate-preferred result
Liberal	Ashton Hurn	17,946	67.4	+5.5
Labor	James Rothe	8,681	32.6	−5.5
Liberal hold		Swing	+5.5	

==== 2022 ====
2022 South Australian state election: Schubert
Party	Candidate	Votes	%	±%
Liberal	Ashton Hurn	12,580	51.4	+2.1
Labor	Connor Watson	5,557	22.7	+1.9
Greens	Beverley Morris	2,493	10.2	+4.8
One Nation	Phill Mueller	1,658	6.8	+6.8
Family First	Alfred Gerhard	934	3.8	+3.8
Independent	Lea Rebane	707	2.9	+2.9
National	Bruce Preece	522	2.1	+2.1
Total formal votes		24,451	96.2	
Informal votes		960	3.8	
Turnout		25,411	92.7	
Two-party-preferred result
Liberal	Ashton Hurn	15,124	61.9	−3.8
Labor	Connor Watson	9,327	38.1	+3.8
Liberal hold		Swing	−3.8	

Distribution of preferences: Schubert
Party	Candidate	Votes	Round 1		Round 2		Round 3		Round 4		Round 5	
Party	Candidate	Votes	Dist.	Total	Dist.	Total	Dist.	Total	Dist.	Total	Dist.	Total
Quota (50% + 1)		12,226										
Liberal	Ashton Hurn	12,580	+226	12,806	+114	12,920	+239	13,159	+1,107	14,266	+858	15,124
Labor	Connor Watson	5,557	+32	5,589	+156	5,745	+139	5,884	+552	6,436	+2,891	9,327
Greens	Beverley Morris	2,493	+70	2,563	+219	2,782	+245	3,027	+722	3,749	Excluded	
One Nation	Phill Mueller	1,658	+71	1,729	+123	1,852	+529	2,381	Excluded			
Family First	Alfred Gerhard	934	+85	1,019	+133	1,152	Excluded					
Independent	Lea Rebane	707	+38	745	Excluded							
National	Bruce Preece	522	Excluded									

=== Elections in the 2010s ===
==== 2018 ====
2018 South Australian state election: Schubert
Party	Candidate	Votes	%	±%
Liberal	Stephan Knoll	11,203	47.9	−4.4
Labor	David Haebich	5,199	22.2	−4.4
SA-Best	Paul Brown	4,577	19.6	+19.6
Greens	Dave Irving	1,222	5.2	−4.2
Conservatives	Rikki Lambert	1,183	5.1	−6.5
Total formal votes		23,384	96.4	−0.7
Informal votes		879	3.6	+0.7
Turnout		24,263	94.3	+3.5
Two-party-preferred result
Liberal	Stephan Knoll	15,042	64.3	+2.0
Labor	David Haebich	8,342	35.7	−2.0
Liberal hold		Swing	+2.0	

2014 South Australian state election: Schubert
Party	Candidate	Votes	%	±%
Liberal	Stephan Knoll	11,922	54.1	−3.2
Labor	Adam Slobodian	5,180	23.5	+0.6
Family First	Tony Hurn	2,713	12.3	+5.8
Greens	Jasemin Rose	2,221	10.1	+0.9
Total formal votes		22,036	96.9	+0.3
Informal votes		697	3.1	−0.3
Turnout		22,733	94.1	−0.7
Two-party-preferred result
Liberal	Stephan Knoll	14,237	64.6	−3.2
Labor	Adam Slobodian	7,799	35.4	+3.2
Liberal hold		Swing	−3.2	

2010 South Australian state election: Schubert
Party	Candidate	Votes	%	±%
Liberal	Ivan Venning	11,936	57.3	+9.3
Labor	Lynda Hopgood	4,772	22.9	−11.0
Greens	Jasemin Rose	1,902	9.1	+2.1
Family First	James Troup	1,355	6.5	−1.2
Independent	William Smidmore	862	4.1	+4.1
Total formal votes		20,827	96.4	
Informal votes		723	3.6	
Turnout		21,550	94.8	
Two-party-preferred result
Liberal	Ivan Venning	14,113	67.8	+11.0
Labor	Lynda Hopgood	6,714	32.2	−11.0
Liberal hold		Swing	+11.0	

=== Elections in the 2000s ===
2006 South Australian state election: Schubert
Party	Candidate	Votes	%	±%
Liberal	Ivan Venning	9,822	47.3	−1.5
Labor	Kym Wilson	7,002	33.7	+12.2
Family First	Phillip Sawyer	1,630	7.9	+7.8
Greens	Patricia Murray	1,551	7.5	+3.1
Democrats	Ian DeLaine	754	3.6	−5.0
Total formal votes		20,759	96.5	
Informal votes		697	3.5	
Turnout		21,456	94.1	
Two-party-preferred result
Liberal	Ivan Venning	11,706	56.4	−7.3
Labor	Kym Wilson	9,053	43.6	+7.3
Liberal hold		Swing	−7.3	

2002 South Australian state election: Schubert
Party	Candidate	Votes	%	±%
Liberal	Ivan Venning	9,668	49.8	−3.0
Labor	Kym Wilson	4,360	22.5	+3.0
Democrats	Kate Reynolds	1,719	8.9	−12.8
National	David Lykke	963	5.0	+5.0
Greens	Pam Kelly	864	4.5	+4.5
SA First	Megan Moody	739	3.8	+3.8
One Nation	Hedley Scholz	725	3.7	+3.7
Independent	Russell Iles	366	1.9	+1.9
Total formal votes		19,404	96.7	
Informal votes		661	3.3	
Turnout		20,065	95.3	
Two-party-preferred result
Liberal	Ivan Venning	12,242	63.1	+4.4
Labor	Kym Wilson	7,162	36.9	+36.9
Liberal hold		Swing	N/A	

=== Elections in the 1990s ===
1997 South Australian state election: Schubert
Party	Candidate	Votes	%	±%
Liberal	Ivan Venning	10,416	52.6	−15.3
Democrats	Pam Kelly	4,270	21.6	+12.1
Labor	Steven May	3,742	18.9	−1.2
United Australia	Mike Manefield	1,383	7.0	+7.0
Total formal votes		19,811	96.3	−1.1
Informal votes		751	3.7	+1.1
Turnout		20,562	93.5	
Two-party-preferred result
Liberal	Ivan Venning	12,854	64.9	−7.6
Labor	Steven May	6,957	35.1	+7.6
Two-candidate-preferred result
Liberal	Ivan Venning	11,630	58.7	−13.8
Democrats	Pam Kelly	8,181	41.3	+41.3
Liberal hold		Swing	N/A	
