= George Bockelberg =

Australian politician (1890–1971)

George Baron Bockelberg (12 December 1890 – 10 October 1971) was an Australian politician. A farmer, he served in the Australian Imperial Force during World War I at Gallipoli and the Western Front. In 1956 he was elected to the South Australian House of Assembly as the Liberal and Country League member for Eyre. He held the seat until his retirement in 1968.

Parliament of South Australia
Preceded by Arthur Christian	Member for Eyre; 1956–1968	Succeeded by Ernie Edwards
