= Results of the 1989 South Australian state election (Legislative Council) =

South Australian state election, 25 November 1989 Legislative Council << 1985–1993 >>
Enrolled voters	941,368				
Votes cast	889,896		Turnout	94.5%	+1.0%
Informal votes	34,612		Informal	3.9%	+0.2%
Summary of votes by party
Party	Primary votes	%	Swing	Seats won	Seats held
Liberal	351,559	41.1%	+1.8%	5	10
Labor	339,961	39.7%	–8.3%	5	10
Democrats	91,456	10.7%	+5.2%	1	2
Call to Australia	21,658	2.5%	–0.5%	0	0
Grey Power	19,486	2.3%	+2.3%	0	0
Conservative	7,657	0.9%	+0.9%	0	0
National	6,700	0.8%	–0.8%	0	0
Independent	16,807	2.0%	+0.9%	0	0
Total	855,284			11	22

This is a list of results for the Legislative Council at the 1989 South Australian state election.

== Continuing members ==
The following MLCs were not up for re-election this year.

Member	Party	Term
John Burdett	Liberal	1985–1993
Legh Davis	Liberal	1985–1993
Trevor Griffin	Liberal	1985–1993
Jamie Irwin	Liberal	1985–1993
Robert Ritson	Liberal	1985–1993
Gordon Bruce	Labor	1985–1993
Trevor Crothers	Labor	1985–1993
Carolyn Pickles	Labor	1985–1993
Terry Roberts	Labor	1985–1993
Barbara Wiese	Labor	1985–1993
Mike Elliott	Democrats	1985–1993

== Election results ==
1989 South Australian state election: Legislative Council
Party	Candidate	Votes	%	±%
Quota		71,274		
Liberal	1. Rob Lucas (elected 1); 2. Martin Cameron (elected 4); 3. Diana Laidlaw (elected 6); 4. Peter Dunn (elected 8); 5. Julian Stefani (elected 10); 6. Maureen Andrews; 7. George Mercer	351,559	41.1	+1.8
Labor	1. Chris Sumner (elected 2); 2. Anne Levy (elected 5); 3. Mario Feleppa (elected 7); 4. George Weatherill (elected 9); 5. Ron Roberts (elected 11); 6. Bill Hender; 7. Janine Hanckel	339,961	39.7	−8.3
Democrats	1. Ian Gilfillan (elected 3); 2. Sandra Kanck; 3. Graham Pamount; 4. Phillip Druce; 5. Kenneth Farmer; 6. Patricia Shortridge	91,456	10.7	+5.2
Call to Australia	1. Stewart Leggett; 2. Robert Brown; 3. Peter Frogley	21,658	2.5	−0.5
Grey Power	1. Don Jessop; 2. Jack Holder	19,486	2.2	+2.3
Independent	Michael Lamb	14,087	1.6	+1.6
Conservative	1. Keith Tidswell; 2. John Horgan; 3. James Atkinson	7,657	0.9	+0.9
National	1. Terry Mullan; 2. Donald Hunt; 3. Stuart Robinson	6,700	0.8	−0.8
Independent	Anastasios Giannouklas	2,267	0.3	+0.3
Independent	Max Tatnell	453	0.1	+0.1
Total formal votes		855,284	96.1	−0.2
Informal votes		34,612	3.9	+0.2
Turnout		889,896	94.5	+1.0

== See also ==
- Candidates of the 1989 South Australian state election
- Members of the South Australian Legislative Council, 1989–1993
