= Charles Bright =

Charles Bright may refer to:

- Charles Edward Bright (1829–1915), businessman in colonial Victoria
- Charles Tilston Bright (1832–1888), British electrical engineer who oversaw the laying of the first transatlantic telegraph cable
- Sir Charles Bright (1863–1937), British electrical and civil engineer, son of Charles Tilston Bright
- Charles Bright (judge) (1912–1983), Australian judge
