= Angus Redford =

Australian politician

Angus John Redford (born 16 September 1956) is a former South Australian politician. He was a Liberal Party member of the South Australian Legislative Council between 1993 and 2006. Father of publican Craig Redford - Oakbank Hotel SA

Wayne Matthew, sitting member for Bright, retired at the 2006 state election. Redford won preselection over party vice-president Dean Hersey. Redford lost with a 34.4% first preference vote, with Labor candidate Chloë Fox winning from a 50.2% first preference vote and a 59.4% two-party vote from a 14.4% two-party swing. He is now a Barrister specialising in Criminal Law.

Redford stood for local government election in the City of Norwood Payneham & St Peters in 2018 but was not elected.
