= Chloë Fox =

Australian politician

Member of the South Australian Parliament for Bright
- In office 2006 – 2014
- Preceded by: Wayne Matthew
- Succeeded by: David Speirs

Personal details
- Born: Chloë Catienne Fox; 22 February 1971 (age 55)
- Party: Australian Labor Party
- Children: One
- Parents: Malcolm Fox (father); Mem Fox (mother)
- Education: University of Adelaide and the City University, London
- Occupation: Journalist, teacher, politician

Chloë Catienne Fox (born 22 February 1971) is an Australian politician who represented the South Australian House of Assembly seat of Bright from 2006 to 2014 for the Labor Party.

== Early life and education ==
Fox is the daughter of Australian children's author, Mem Fox and teacher Malcolm Fox. Fox attended Blackwood High School in Adelaide's south and attended the University of Adelaide and the City University, London.

== Career ==
Fox worked as a journalist at the Adelaide Advertiser for three and a half years, traveled to France, where she worked for Elle Online and UNESCO, before returning to Adelaide, where she undertook a Graduate Diploma in Education, and then worked as a high school teacher of English, French and History at Loreto College, Marryatville.

Fox was involved in politics from a young age, handing out Labor how-to-vote cards at the age of 14. Fox was linked with the Shop, Distributive and Allied Employees Association (SDA).

At the 2004 federal election, she stood against member Andrew Southcott in the safe Liberal seat of Boothby and achieved a 9.9 percent primary and 2 percent two-party swing. She subsequently ran in the marginal Liberal seat of Bright at the 2006 South Australian state election against shadow minister Angus Redford, who was attempting to switch from the Legislative Council to the House of Assembly. She was tipped to face a difficult battle, but won in a landslide, having achieved a 16.9 percent primary and 14.4 percent two-party swing—enough to turn Bright into a safe Labor seat in one stroke. She actually won enough primary votes to take the seat off the Liberals without the need for preferences.

In March 2009 Fox became Parliamentary Secretary to the Premier during a ministerial reshuffle in the Rann government.

In April 2010, Fox was appointed Deputy Speaker and the Chairman of Committees in the House of Assembly. In 2011 she was named as the SA Transport Services Minister. She was also appointed as Minister Assisting the Minister for the Arts. In the 2014 state election she was not returned to her seat.

In September 2014 she was appointed to the Lifetime Support Authority. In January 2015 she was employed as a French teacher at Brighton Secondary School. As of 2018, she has been a French teacher at Mitcham Girls High School.

== Personal life ==
Fox was engaged to fellow politician Leon Bignell from March 2006 to March 2007 until the wedding was called off.

In late 2009 Fox announced she was pregnant, with the birth due in March 2010, around the time of the 2010 state election. The father's identity has been kept confidential by Fox following the breakdown of their longtime relationship. Her son, Theo, was born two months premature in January 2010.

South Australian House of Assembly
Preceded by Wayne Matthew	Member for Bright; 2006–2014	Succeeded by David Speirs
