= Stephan Knoll =

Australian politician

The Honourable Stephan Knoll
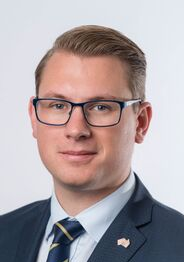

Minister for Transport and Infrastructure
- In office 22 March 2018 – 26 July 2020
- Premier: Steven Marshall
- Preceded by: Stephen Mullighan
- Succeeded by: Corey Wingard

Minister for Local Government
- In office 22 March 2018 – 26 July 2020
- Premier: Steven Marshall
- Preceded by: Geoff Brock
- Succeeded by: Vickie Chapman

Minister for Planning
- In office 22 March 2018 – 26 July 2020
- Premier: Steven Marshall
- Preceded by: John Rau
- Succeeded by: Vickie Chapman

Leader of Government Business
- In office 5 February 2020 – 26 July 2020
- Preceded by: John Gardner
- Succeeded by: Dan van Holst Pellekaan

Member of the South Australian House of Assembly for Schubert
- In office 15 March 2014 – 19 March 2022
- Preceded by: Ivan Venning
- Succeeded by: Ashton Hurn

Personal details
- Born: Stephan Karl Knoll; 1982 or 1983 (age 43–44)
- Party: Liberal Party of Australia (SA)
- Education: University of Adelaide
- Occupation: General manager

Stephan Karl Knoll (/stɛˈfɑːn kəˈnɒl/, born 1982 or 1983) is an Australian former politician who represented the South Australian House of Assembly electorate of Schubert for the Liberal Party from 2014 to 2022. Knoll served as Minister for Transport, Infrastructure and Local Government and Minister for Planning in the Marshall Ministry between 2018 and 2020, and as Leader of Government Business in the House of Assembly from February to July 2020.

== Background and early career ==
Knoll attended Christian Brothers College, Adelaide, and the University of Adelaide, completing a Bachelor of Commerce (Marketing).

Prior to entering State Parliament he was general manager of his family's small business Barossa Fine Foods.

He also served as State President of the South Australian Young Liberal Movement.

== Parliamentary career ==
After his election in 2014, Knoll was appointed to the Parliamentary Committee on Occupational Safety, Rehabilitation and Compensation.

In January 2016, Knoll released a booklet entitled "40 Reasons Why You Can't Trust Labor with Your Money". Also in January, Knoll was promoted to Shadow Parliamentary Secretary for Waste, Deregulation, and IT use in government. In February 2016, Knoll was appointed to the Parliament's Economic and Finance Committee.

In January 2017, fourteen months before the 2018 state election, Knoll was promoted to the shadow cabinet, taking on the portfolios of Police, Emergency Services, Corrections and Road Safety.

Following the March 2018 election, he was appointed Minister for Transport, Infrastructure and Local Government and Minister for Planning. On 5 February 2020, Knoll was appointed as Leader of Government Business in the House.

During Knoll's time as minister, a record $1.1 billion was committed for regional road projects and infrastructure upgrades across the state in the 2019-20 State Budget. This was the single biggest injection of new funding in a state budget for regional roads in South Australia's history. Knoll also advocated and secured the construction of twin tunnels to complete the North-South Corridor as part of the 2020 State Budget.

During his tenure as Planning Minister, Knoll navigated the rolling implementation of broader system changes including the introduction of a statewide electronic planning system - the first of its kind in Australia. Phase 1 of the Planning and Design Code was rolled out in Outback SA on 1 July 2019, with Phase 2 (Rural) introduced on 31 July 2020 and Phase 3 (Urban) on 19 March 2021.

In June 2020, Knoll introduced the Local Government Reform Bill in Parliament. Key elements in the Bill were rate capping, the establishment of behavioural standards for councillors and reductions of red tape to improve efficiency and lessen the burden on councils. The Bill was passed in June 2021, with the omission of rate capping.

In July 2020, as part of a broader investigation into a number of country MPs, Knoll was investigated by the Independent Commissioner Against Corruption (ICAC) into the possible misuse of the Country Members Accommodation Allowance. Knoll resigned from cabinet on 26 July 2020. On 15 October 2020, the ICAC announced that there would be no further inquiry or investigation relating to some of the members of parliament, including Knoll. Mr Knoll was found guilty of misconduct after attempting to sack members of the Adelaide Cemeteries board without authority.

The Urban Renewal Authority, trading as Renewal SA, was within his portfolio responsibilities until 28 July 2020, when it was moved to that of the Treasurer, Rob Lucas.

On 1 December 2020, Knoll announced he did not intend to contest the 2022 election. He retired from politics after the 2022 election. He now runs Sympatheia Strategic Advisory, a business advisory company.

Political offices
Preceded by Stephen Mullighan	Minister for Transport and Infrastructure; 2018–2020	Succeeded by Corey Wingard
Preceded by Geoff Brock	Minister for Local Government; 2018–2020	Succeeded by Vickie Chapman
Preceded by John Rau	Minister for Planning; 2018–2020	Succeeded by Vickie Chapman
South Australian House of Assembly
Preceded by Ivan Venning	Member for Schubert; 2014–2022	Succeeded by Ashton Hurn
