= Arthur Christian (politician) =

Australian politician

Arthur William Christian (7 October 1893 – 8 January 1956) was an Australian politician who represented the South Australian House of Assembly seats of Flinders from 1933 to 1938 and Eyre from 1938 to 1956 for the Liberal and Country League.
