= Jack Slater (politician) =

Australian politician

The Honourable Jack Slater

Minister for Recreation and Sport Minister for Water Resources
- In office 10 November 1982 – 18 December 1985
- Premier: John Bannon
- Preceded by: Michael Wilson
- Succeeded by: Kym Mayes

Member of the South Australian Parliament for Gilles
- In office 30 May 1970 – 24 November 1989
- Preceded by: constituency established
- Succeeded by: Colin McKee

Personal details
- Born: John William Slater; 3 September 1927 Adelaide, Australia
- Died: 23 February 1997 (aged 69) Adelaide, Australia
- Party: Labor Party

John William "Jack" Slater (3 September 1927 – 23 February 1997) was an Australian politician who represented the South Australian House of Assembly seat of Gilles for the Labor Party from 1970 to 1993. He was Minister of Recreation and Sport and Minister of Water Resources in the first term of the Bannon government from 1982 to 1985.
