= Charles Bright (judge) =

Justice of the Supreme Court of South Australia

The Honourable Sir Charles Hart Bright KBE (25 November 1912 – 16 May 1983) was a Justice of the Supreme Court of South Australia and chancellor of Flinders University.

== Early life ==
Bright was born on 25 November 1912 in Norwood, a suburb of Adelaide, South Australia, the second child of Baptist minister Charles Bright and his second wife Annie Florence (née Hollidge). He attended Scotch College and studied law at the University of Adelaide, following which he was admitted to the South Australian Bar on 15 December 1934.

== Career ==
Bright started out working for Shierlaw, Frisby Smith & Romilly Harry, before becoming partners with O. C. Isaachsen in 1940. Bright served as full-time captain of the Australian Army Legal Department from 4 January 1943 till 1 November 1944, when he became a reserve officer. In 1945, Bright and Isaachsen had a new partner, Zelling, although their law firm was dissolved in 1954. Bright, who preferred commercial and tax-related cases, then partnered with D. B. McLeod. In 1961, he was appointed as president of the Law Society of South Australia, a post he held till 1963. From 1962 to 1963, he was a councillor at the Law Council of Australia. In October 1963, Bright became a judge of the Supreme Court of South Australia.

Bright was also active in the wider community. For instance, he sat on the Physiotherapists Board of South Australia for some ten years and was president of the Minda Home in Brighton for six years, which caters to individuals with mental disabilities. He was also vice-president of the Musica Viva Society of Australia and the Australian Red Cross Society in South Australia. Bright became the first pro-chancellor of the South Australia-based Flinders University, and chaired its finance and buildings committee. In 1971, he became the university's chancellor, taking over Sir Mark Mitchell. Bright retired from the bench in December 1978 and was knighted in 1980. In view of his declining health, he stepped down as chancellor in 1983.

== Personal life and death ==
Bright was raised as a Protestant. On 31 August 1940, Bright married doctor Elizabeth Holden (née Flaxman), whose great-grandfather was Charles Flaxman. They had a daughter and two sons. After resigning as chancellor of Flinders University, Bright was awarded an honorary Doctor of Letters on 13 May 1983. He died on 16 May 1983 in his home in North Adelaide. The cause of death was cancer. Bright's book on his wife's great-grandfather, whom he had researched on while studying for a postgraduate degree in history at Flinders University, was posthumously released in the same year. The Sir Charles Bright Scholarship Trust was set up in 1985 for disabled South Australians looking to pursue tertiary education.
