= 1990 Custance state by-election =

- 23 June 1990

Electoral district of Custance in the South Australian House of Assembly

	First party	Second party	Third party
Candidate	Ivan Venning	Charles Greeneklee	Grantley Siviour
Party	Liberal	Labor	National
Primary vote	7,595	3,801	2,964
Percentage	46.8%	23.4%	18.3%
Swing	▼14.8	▼2.0	▲14.6
TPP	68.2%	31.8%
TPP swing	▼2.0	▲2.0
MP before election
John Olsen
Liberal
Elected MP
Ivan Venning
Liberal

A by-election was held for the South Australian House of Assembly seat of Custance on 23 June 1990. This was triggered by the resignation of former state Liberal leader and MHA John Olsen.

== Results ==
The Liberals retained the seat after preferences.

Custance state by-election, 23 June 1990
Party	Candidate	Votes	%	±%
Liberal	Ivan Venning	7,595	46.8	−14.8
Labor	Charles Greeneklee	3,801	23.4	−2.0
National	Grantley Siviour	2,964	18.3	+14.6
Democrats	David Clarke	1,174	7.2	+1.4
Call to Australia	Bruce Slee	698	4.3	+0.8
Total formal votes		16,232	97.6	+0.2
Informal votes		400	2.4	−0.2
Turnout		16,632	88.1	−6.9
Two-party-preferred result
Liberal	Ivan Venning	11,064	68.2	−2.0
Labor	Charles Greeneklee	5,168	31.8	+2.0
Liberal hold		Swing	−2.0	

== See also ==
- List of South Australian state by-elections
