= Electoral district of Bright =

Former state electoral district of South Australia

Bright South Australia—House of Assembly
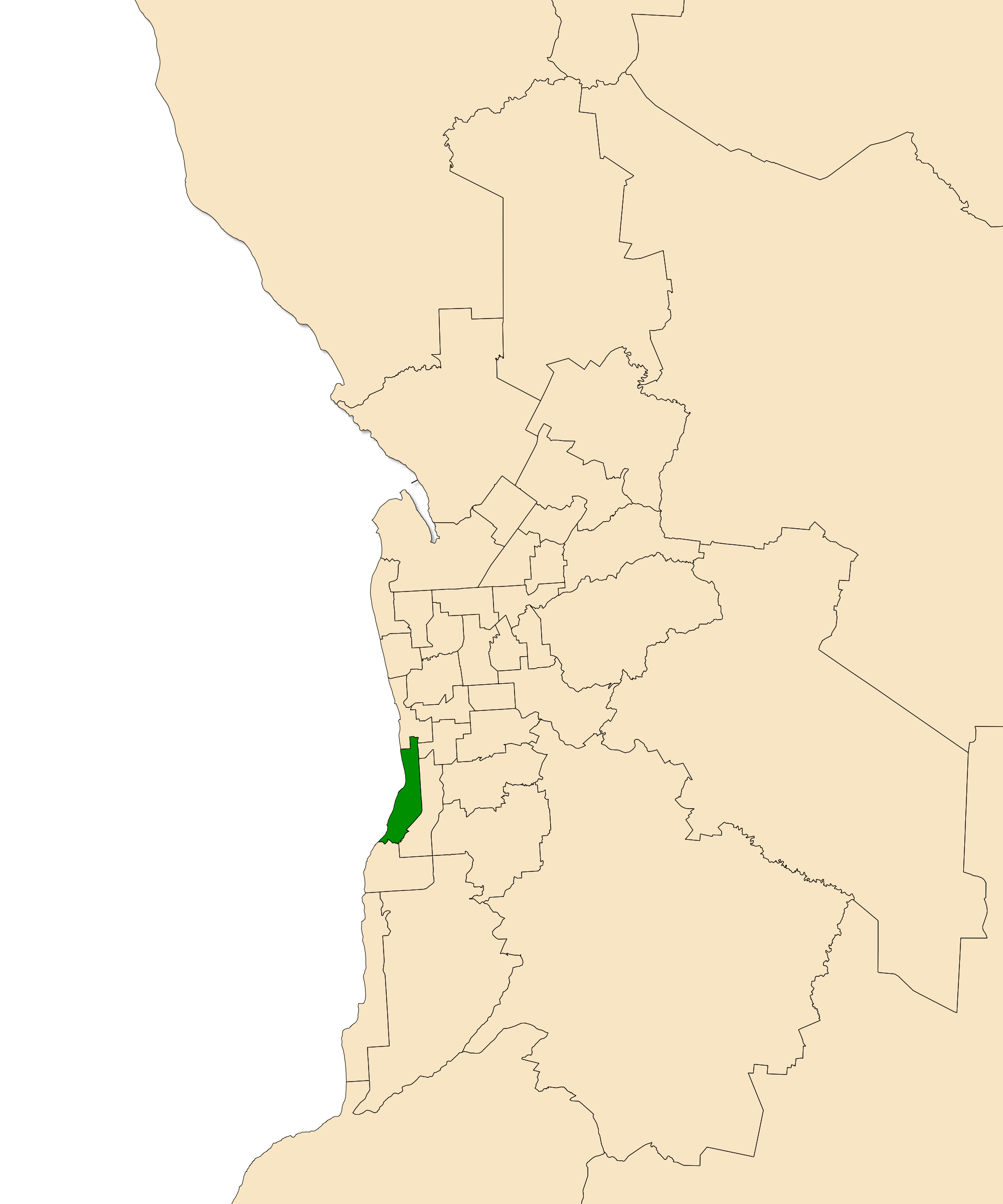
- Electoral district of Bright (green) in the Greater Adelaide area
- State: South Australia
- Created: 1985
- Abolished: 2018
- Namesake: Charles Bright
- Electors: 24,381 (2014)
- Area: 22.8 km^{2} (8.8 sq mi)
- Demographic: Metropolitan
- Coordinates: 35°2′30″S 138°30′35″E

Bright is a former electorate for the South Australian House of Assembly. It was named in honour of Charles Bright, at various times South Australian Supreme Court Judge, Flinders University Chancellor, Health Commission chairman, and Electoral Boundaries Commission chairman. Prior to its 2018 abolition, the seat covered southern coastal suburbs of Adelaide including Brighton, North Brighton, South Brighton, Hallett Cove, Hove, Kingston Park, Marino, Seacliff, Seacliff Park and part of Somerton Park.

The electorate was created at the 1983 redistribution, to replace the abolished seat of Brighton, as a marginal Liberal seat with a notional one percent two-party margin. However, it was won by the Labor's Derek Robertson at the 1985 election, before being won by Liberal Wayne Matthew at the 1989 election. He held the seat until his retirement at the 2006 election. Liberal shadow minister Angus Redford left the South Australian Legislative Council to contest the seat but was defeated by Labor's Chloë Fox from a 14.4 percent swing, the largest in the state, amidst a statewide landslide averaging a 7.7 percent swing.

After the enactment of the "fairness clause," Bright's boundaries were frequently altered by the Electoral Commission of South Australia in order to produce "fairer" electoral boundaries. A shift of a few kilometres along O'Halloran Hill significantly altered the seat's political landscape. Moving the seat to the south shifted the margin in favour of Labor, while moving it to the north benefited the Liberals. As evidence of this, the redistribution ahead of the 2010 election pared Fox's margin from 9.2 percent–just on the edge of being safe–to 6.6 percent. At that election, the Liberals picked up a 6.2 percent swing, just short of picking up the seat, with Labor retaining the seat on a 0.4 percent margin, making Bright Labor's most marginal seat following the 2010 election. Liberal David Speirs won the seat from a 3.7 percent swing at the 2014 election.

Bright was abolished at the 2018 state election following the 2016 electoral redistribution. On paper, it was replaced by Gibson.

Speirs decided to contest Black, which had absorbed much of Bright's southern portion, at the 2018 state election.

== Members for Bright ==
Member	Party	Term
Derek Robertson	Labor	1985–1989
Wayne Matthew	Liberal	1989–2006
Chloë Fox	Labor	2006–2014
David Speirs	Liberal	2014–2018

== Election results ==
2014 South Australian state election: Bright
Party	Candidate	Votes	%	±%
Liberal	David Speirs	10,780	48.5	+4.6
Labor	Chloë Fox	8,491	38.2	−4.0
Greens	Jamie Ryan	2,081	9.4	+1.5
Family First	Steve Price	852	3.8	+0.9
Total formal votes		22,204	97.8	+0.8
Informal votes		488	2.2	−0.8
Turnout		22,692	93.1	−0.4
Two-party-preferred result
Liberal	David Speirs	11,829	53.3	+3.7
Labor	Chloë Fox	10,375	46.7	−3.7
Liberal gain from Labor		Swing	+3.7	
