= Ivan Venning =

Australian politician

- Born: Ivan Howard Venning; 26 December 1945 (age 80); Crystal Brook, South Australia
- Spouse: Kay Venning
- Parent(s): Howard Venning and Shirley
- Relatives: Tom Venning (nephew)

Member of the South Australian Parliament for Custance
- In office 23 June 1990 – 11 October 1997
- Preceded by: John Olsen
- Succeeded by: District abolished

Member of the South Australian Parliament for Schubert
- In office 11 October 1997 – 15 March 2014
- Preceded by: District created
- Succeeded by: Stephan Knoll

Personal details
- Party: Liberal Party of Australia (SA)

Military service
- Allegiance: Australia
- Branch/service: Australian Army
- Unit: Royal Australian Artillery

Ivan Howard Venning (born 26 December 1945) is an Australian politician and was the Liberal Party member of the South Australian House of Assembly from 1990 until 2014. He did not re-contest his seat at the 2014 state election.

Venning was one of five children and the eldest son to Howard and Shirley Venning. Howard himself entered state parliament at the 1968 election and served for 11 years. Venning attended Crystal Brook Primary School and Prince Alfred College in Adelaide, and worked on the family farm until 1966, when he was called up for National Service, serving in the Royal Australian Artillery as a gunner, operator and batman to the Commanding Officer III Battery. Venning also served for 10 years in local government, and is a justice of the peace.

Venning was elected to parliament at the 1990 Custance by-election. The seat was abolished in place of Schubert in time for the 1997 state election.

In 1994, Venning was elected as Chair of the Environment, Resources and Development (ERD) Committee—a position he held for four years, and has served in the committee since 2006. He also served on the Public Works Committee for four years. He was Opposition Whip from 2006 to 2010.

== Notes ==
South Australian House of Assembly
Preceded by John Olsen	Member for Custance; 1990–1997	Succeeded by District abolished
Preceded by District created	Member for Schubert; 1997–2014	Succeeded by Stephan Knoll
