= Colleen Hutchison =

Australian politician

Colleen Fay Hutchison (born 7 November 1934) is an Australian politician. She was a Labor Party member of the South Australian House of Assembly from 1989 to 1993, representing the electorate of Stuart.

Hutchison was elected to the House of Assembly at the 1989 state election, succeeding veteran Labor MP Gavin Keneally. She served on the Economics and Finance Committee during her term. Her seat of Stuart was abolished and merged into the adjacent seat of Eyre in an electoral redistribution for the 1993 election. Hutchison contested Eyre at the election, but was defeated by its long-term Liberal incumbent, Graham Gunn.

Hutchison subsequently served on the Port Augusta City Council, including a stint as deputy mayor.

Parliament of South Australia
Preceded by Gavin Keneally	Member for Stuart; 1989-1993	Succeeded by Graham Gunn
