= Michael Atkinson (politician) =

Australian politician

The Honourable Michael Atkinson
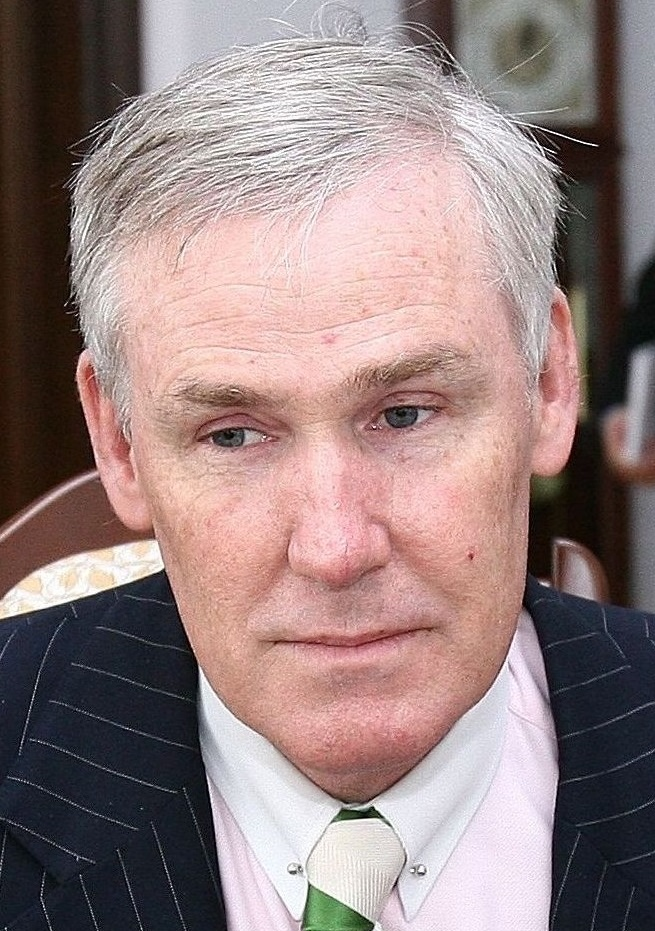

34th Speaker of the South Australian House of Assembly
- In office 5 February 2013 – 16 March 2018
- Premier: Jay Weatherill
- Preceded by: Lyn Breuer
- Succeeded by: Vincent Tarzia

46th Attorney-General of South Australia
- In office 5 March 2002 – 30 June 2003
- Premier: Mike Rann
- Preceded by: Robert Lawson
- Succeeded by: Paul Holloway
- In office 29 August 2003 – 21 March 2010
- Premier: Mike Rann
- Preceded by: Paul Holloway
- Succeeded by: John Rau

Member of the South Australian Parliament for Croydon
- In office 9 February 2002 – 17 March 2018
- Preceded by: New District
- Succeeded by: Peter Malinauskas

Member of the South Australian Parliament for Spence
- In office 25 November 1989 – 9 February 2002
- Preceded by: Roy Abbott
- Succeeded by: District Abolished

Personal details
- Born: Michael John Atkinson; 17 June 1958 (age 68)
- Party: Australian Labor Party (SA)
- Domestic partner: Jennifer Rankine
- Education: BA (Hons), LLB
- Profession: Journalist

Michael John Atkinson (born 17 June 1958), a former Australian politician in the South Australian Branch of the Australian Labor Party, was a member of the Parliament of South Australia from 1989 to 2018.

Atkinson was the 34th Speaker of the South Australian House of Assembly in the Jay Weatherill government from 2013 to 2018. Before this post, he was the 46th Attorney-General of South Australia, Minister for Justice, Minister for Veterans' Affairs, and Minister for Multicultural Affairs in the Mike Rann Labor Government. A day after the 2010 election, he stepped down as Attorney-General and resigned from the Cabinet. Atkinson represented the South Australian House of Assembly seat of Croydon from the seat's creation in 2002 until 2018, and previously Spence from 1989 until the seat was abolished and replaced by Croydon in 2002.

He was a member of the Australian Journalists Association whilst working for the Adelaide Advertiser. He is currently a member of the Shop Distributive and Allied Employees Association.

== Early life ==
Atkinson attended Glenelg Primary School and Unley High School. He then studied at the Australian National University and received a Bachelor of Arts (Hons) degree in history and also a Bachelor of Laws degree.

He worked as a sub-editor and journalist for the Adelaide Advertiser from 1982 to 1985, an adviser and press secretary to federal minister Chris Hurford from 1985 to 1987, before becoming an advocate for the Shop, Distributive and Allied Employees Association (SDA) in 1989.

== Parliamentary career ==
A founding member of the Labor Right faction, Atkinson was first elected to Parliament at the 1989 election. Following the 1993 election, he was shadow minister in a range of portfolios until Labor won government at the 2002 election. He subsequently became Attorney-General, Minister for Justice, Minister for Consumer Affairs and Minister for Multicultural Affairs in the Rann cabinet. In a minor cabinet reshuffle in 2004, Atkinson lost his portfolio of Consumer Affairs. He became Minister for Correctional Services in 2006.

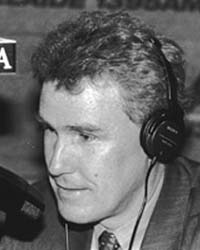
Atkinson earlier in his political career.

He was re-elected at the 2006 election landslide in his seat of Croydon with a 76 percent two-party vote from a 6.9 percent two-party swing toward him. At the 2010 election Atkinson was again re-elected, but with a 12 percent two-party swing against him, significantly higher than the statewide 8.4 percent two-party swing. Following his re-election, he announced he would resign from the Rann ministry but remain on the backbench. Atkinson was re-elected at the 2014 election where he picked up a 3.5 percent two-party swing toward him.

On 5 February 2013 Atkinson replaced Lyn Breuer as Speaker of the South Australian House of Assembly.

In September 2016, Peter Malinauskas moved house and into Atkinson's electorate of Croydon. He said of Atkinson: "Mick [Atkinson] knows the movements of every single one of his constituents – I suspect I’m no exception.”

Atkinson announced in February 2017 that he would be retiring from parliament as of the 2018 election.

== Political views ==
=== Media classification and censorship ===
Atkinson had blocked several attempts to introduce a R18+ for video games in Australia. In a letter on the subject, Atkinson stated, "I don't support the introduction of an R18+ rating for electronic games, chiefly because it will greatly increase the risk of children and vulnerable adults being exposed to damaging images and messages." He also withdrew his support for a discussion paper released for public consultation on the subject of an R18+ rating.

Unanimity from Atkinson and his fellow state and federal Attorneys-General is required for the introduction of the rating (or a change to that requirement). Australia's rating system lacked a classification for games above MA15+ at the time. It therefore lacked not only an equivalent rating to the ESRB's AO (adults only) rating but also an equivalent to its Mature (17+) rating. After Atkinson stepped down as Attorney-General in 2010, an R18+ rating for video games in Australia was eventually implemented in 2013.

In 2009, Atkinson, in his role as attorney-general of South Australia, introduced laws into parliament that made internet commentary on the upcoming 2010 election illegal unless the commenter provided their real name and postcode. The laws were passed, and came into effect on 6 January 2010. Following public criticism, Atkinson later promised to repeal the section following the 2010 South Australian election and indicated it would not be enforced during the electoral period.

=== Victims' rights ===
In 2008, Atkinson introduced legislation aimed at increasing the rights of victims of crime. The legislation purported to allow victims to suggest a suitable sentence for the offender and made it compulsory for judges to consider imposing a restraining order on convicted sex offenders.

=== Casting votes ===
During his time as speaker, Atkinson used his casting vote in Parliament to oppose several bills presented during the Weatherill government. These include a bill which would have allowed transgender people to have their gender officially changed on their birth certificates and another bill intended to enable voluntary euthanasia.

== Personal life ==
Atkinson is separated from his wife, Joan (née Phyland), with whom he has three sons and a daughter. Atkinson's long-term and current de facto partner is fellow state Labor MP Jennifer Rankine.

Atkinson is a member of the Traditional Anglican Communion, and was formerly its chancellor.

=== Health and Lifestyle ===
Atkinson is a member of the Next Generation Memorial Drive gym.

Aligning further to his health conscious nature he is known to put nettles in his smoothies, highlighting their "outstanding mineral profile".

Atkinson is recorded as cultivating a garlic crop.

South Australian House of Assembly
Preceded by Roy Abbott	Member of Parliament for Spence; 1989–2002	District abolished
New district	Member of Parliament for Croydon; 2002–2018	Succeeded by Peter Malinauskas
Preceded by Lyn Breuer	Speaker of the South Australian House of Assembly; 2013–2018	Succeeded by Vincent Tarzia
Political offices
Preceded by Robert Lawson	Attorney-General of South Australia; 2002–2003	Succeeded by Paul Holloway
Preceded by Paul Holloway	Attorney-General of South Australia; 2003–2010	Succeeded by John Rau
