= Ernie Edwards (politician) =

Australian politician

Ernest Clifford Allan (Ernie) Edwards (16 September 1912 – 9 May 1974) was an Australian politician who represented the South Australian House of Assembly seat of Eyre from 1968 to 1970 for the Liberal and Country League.
