= Roy Abbott =

Australian politician

The Honourable Roy Abbott

Minister of Transport
- In office 10 Nov 1982 – 16 Jul 1985

Minister of Marine
- In office 10 Nov 1982 – 29 Jul 1988

Minister for Forests
- In office 16 July 1985 – 29 Jul 1988

Minister of Lands
- In office 16 Jul 1985 – 29 Jul 1988

Minister of Repatriation
- In office 16 Jul 1985 – 29 Jul 1988

Minister of Repatriation
- In office 16 Jul 1985 – 29 Jul 1988

Minister of Community Welfare
- In office 15 Mar 1979 – 18 Sep 1979

Member of the South Australian Parliament for Spence
- In office 12 Jul 1975 – 24 Nov 1989

Personal details
- Born: 30 August 1927 (age 98)
- Died: 19 March 2004 Adelaide, South Australia
- Party: Australian Labor Party (SA)
- Website: SA Parliament Biography

Roy Kitto Abbott (30 August 1927 – 19 March 2004) was an Australian politician who represented the South Australian House of Assembly seat of Spence from 1975 to 1989 for the Labor Party.

He was Minister of Community Welfare in the Corcoran government in 1979, and Minister of Transport (1982–1985), Minister of Marine (1982–1988), and Minister of Forests, Minister of Lands and Minister of Repatriation (1985–1988) in the Bannon government.
