= Derek Robertson (politician) =

Australian politician

Derek James Robertson was an Australian politician who represented the South Australian House of Assembly seat of Bright for the Labor Party from 1985 to 1989.

South Australian House of Assembly
New seat	Member for Bright; 1985–1989	Succeeded by Wayne Matthew
