= Electoral district of Eyre (South Australia) =

Former South Australian state electoral district

Eyre South Australia—House of Assembly
- State: South Australia
- Created: 1938
- Abolished: 1997
- Namesake: Edward John Eyre
- Demographic: Rural
- Coordinates: 29°S 137°E

Footnotes
- coordinates

Eyre was an electoral district of the House of Assembly in the Australian state of South Australia from 1938 to 1997.

The seat was located in the vast outback of northern South Australia. It was held by the Liberal Party and its predecessor, the Liberal and Country League, for its entire existence, and was usually a safely conservative seat. For the last 27 years of its existence, it was held by Graham Gunn, who was originally elected in 1970 as a member of the LCL and served as Speaker of the South Australian House of Assembly in the Dean Brown government.

Eyre was pushed to the south ahead of the 1993 election, taking in much of the abolished seat of Stuart. Eyre was abolished in a boundary redistribution prior to the 1997 election, dividing the northern South Australian outback into two seats. The eastern half was transferred to the recreated seat of Stuart, while the western half became part of the massively expanded seat of Giles. Gunn successfully transferred to Stuart.

== Members ==
Member	Party	Term
Arthur Christian	Liberal and Country	1938–1956
George Bockelberg	Liberal and Country	1956–1968
Ernie Edwards	Liberal and Country	1968–1970
Graham Gunn	Liberal and Country	1970–1974
Graham Gunn	Liberal	1974–1997
