= Graham Gunn =

Australian politician

The Honourable Graham Gunn AM

Father of the Parliament of South Australia
- In office 11 December 1993 – 20 March 2010
- Preceded by: Stan Evans
- Succeeded by: Rob Lucas

Speaker of the South Australian House of Assembly
- In office 11 February 1994 – 2 December 1997
- Preceded by: Norm Peterson
- Succeeded by: John Oswald

Member of the South Australian House of Assembly
- In office 30 May 1970 – 20 March 2010
- Preceded by: Ernie Edwards (Eyre); Colleen Hutchison (Stuart)
- Succeeded by: district abolished (Eyre); Dan van Holst Pellekaan (Stuart)
- Constituency: Eyre (1970-1997); Stuart (1997-2010)

Alderman of the Streaky Bay Council
- Incumbent
- Assumed office 7 March 2017
- In office 2 July 1966 – 4 July 1970

Personal details
- Born: Graham McDonald Gunn; 5 September 1942 (age 84) Mount Cooper, South Australia
- Party: Liberal and Country League (1970-1974), Liberal Party of Australia (1974-2010)
- Education: Scotch College, Adelaide
- Occupation: Grazier

Graham McDonald Gunn, AM (born 5 September 1942), was an Australian politician who was a member of the South Australian House of Assembly. A member of the Liberal Party, he represented the electorate of Eyre from 1970 to 1997, and the electorate of Stuart from 1997 to 2010. By the final years of his parliamentary career, Gunn had become the longest-serving member of any parliament in Australia.

After attending Adelaide's Scotch College, Gunn pursued a career as a farmer and grazier in the Mount Cooper area. He served on the Streaky Bay Council between 1966 and 1970. In 1970, he was elected to the House of Assembly for Eyre, in South Australia's vast northern outback, as a member of the then Liberal and Country League (LCL), which became the South Australian division of the Liberal Party in 1974. Aged 27, he was one of the youngest politicians in Australia at the time.

Gunn served as Speaker of the South Australian House of Assembly from 1994 to 1997, during the Brown Liberal Government, but lost that office after John Olsen ascended to the Liberal leadership.

For most of his tenure, Gunn was re-elected with little difficulty. However, before the 1997 state election, his old seat was abolished in a redistribution. Gunn contested the electorate of Stuart, essentially the eastern half of his former seat. While he went into the election sitting on a notional majority of eight percent, he suffered a 7.5 percent swing against him due to a vigorous Labor campaign. He also faced a strong challenge from Labor candidate Justin Jarvis in the 2006 state election, with the final result not being known until nine days after the election. Gunn ultimately emerged victorious, albeit by only 233 votes.

Gunn retired at the 2010 state election, having spent half of his life in the state parliament. He was the last surviving parliamentarian from the LCL, as well as the last parliamentary survivor of the Dunstan, Corcoran and Tonkin governments. The Liberals pre-selected former national basketball player Dan van Holst Pellekaan to defend Stuart.

On Australia Day 2011, Gunn was appointed a Member of the Order of Australia.

Parliament of South Australia
Preceded by Ernest Edwards	Member for Eyre; 1970–1997	District abolished
New district	Member for Stuart; 1997–2010	Succeeded by Dan van Holst Pellekaan
Preceded by Stan Evans	Father of the Parliament of South Australia; 1993–2010	Succeeded by Rob Lucas
Preceded by Norm Peterson	Speaker of the South Australian House of Assembly; 1994–1997	Succeeded by John Oswald
