= Electoral district of Hayward =

Former South Australian state electoral district

Coordinates: 35°06′54″S 138°30′04″E

Hayward South Australia—House of Assembly
- State: South Australia
- Created: 1985
- Abolished: 1993
- Demographic: Metropolitan

Hayward was an electoral district of the House of Assembly in the Australian state of South Australia from 1985 to 1993.

Hayward was abolished in a boundary redistribution in 1993.

== Members ==
Member	Party	Term
June Appleby	Labor	1985–1989
Mark Brindal	Liberal	1989–1993
