= Electoral district of Custance =

Former South Australian state electoral district

Custance South Australia—House of Assembly
- State: South Australia
- Created: 1985
- Abolished: 1997
- Demographic: Rural

Custance was an electoral district of the House of Assembly in the Australian state of South Australia from 1985 to 1997. Until the 1991 electoral redistribution, the district stretched from just outside Port Pirie in the north to the Barossa Valley in the south.

John Olsen moved from the abolished Rocky River to Custance at the 1985 election.

Custance was abolished and replaced by Schubert at the 1997 election.

The Barossa Valley area was first represented by the seat of Barossa.

== Members for Custance ==
Member	Party	Term
John Olsen	Liberal	1985–1990
Ivan Venning	Liberal	1990–1997

== See also ==
- 1990 Custance state by-election
