= Electoral district of Spence =

Former South Australian state electoral district

Spence South Australia—House of Assembly
- State: South Australia
- Created: 1970
- Abolished: 2002
- Demographic: Metropolitan

Spence was an electoral district of the House of Assembly in the Australian state of South Australia from 1970 to 2002. The district was based in the inner north-west suburbs of Adelaide.

The district was a safe seat for the Labor Party. Spence was renamed Croydon with effect at the 2002 state election.

== Members for Spence ==
Member	Party	Term
Ernie Crimes	Labor	1970–1975
Roy Abbott	Labor	1975–1989
Michael Atkinson	Labor	1989–2002
