= Electoral district of Gilles =

Former South Australian state electoral division

Coordinates: 34°51′50″S 138°39′35″E

Gilles South Australia—House of Assembly
- State: South Australia
- Created: 1970
- Abolished: 1993
- Demographic: Metropolitan

Gilles was an electoral district of the House of Assembly in the Australian state of South Australia from 1970 to 1993.

In 1977, the polling places were: Greenacres, Hillcrest, Klemzig, Manningham, Marden, Paradise West, Vale Park, Windsor Gardens and Windsor Grove.

Gilles was the Dunstan Labor government's most and only marginal seat following the 1973 election, and the Dunstan Labor government's most marginal seat following the 1975 election. Gilles was abolished in a boundary redistribution at the 1993 election. The re-created seat of Torrens absorbed much of the seat, remaining a marginal Liberal seat.

== Members ==
Member	Party	Term
Jack Slater	Labor	1970–1989
Colin McKee	Labor	1989–1993
