= Colin McKee (politician) =

Australian politician (1949–2021)

Member of the South Australian Parliament for Gilles
- In office 25 November 1989 – 10 December 1993
- Preceded by: Jack Slater
- Succeeded by: District abolished

Personal details
- Born: Colin David Thomas McKee; 8 August 1949 Adelaide, South Australia
- Died: 6 July 2021 (aged 71) Adelaide, South Australia
- Party: Labor Party

Colin David Thomas McKee (8 August 1949 – 6 July 2021) was a South Australian politician who represented the South Australian House of Assembly seat of Gilles from 1989 to 1993 for the Labor Party.

South Australian House of Assembly
Preceded by Jack Slater	Member for Gilles; 1989–1993	District abolished
