= Wayne Matthew =

Australian politician (born 1958)

The Honourable Wayne Matthew JP, BA

Member of the South Australian Parliament for Bright
- In office 25 November 1989 – 17 March 2006
- Preceded by: Derek Robertson
- Succeeded by: Chloë Fox

Personal details
- Born: 14 January 1958 (age 68) Henley Beach, South Australia
- Party: Liberal Party
- Education: University of Adelaide
- Occupation: Systems Analyst / Project Manager

Wayne Anthony Matthew (born 14 January 1958) is a former Australian politician. He was a member of the South Australian House of Assembly seat of Bright for the Liberal Party from 1989 to 2006.

Matthew was elected at the 1989 election, defeating Labor's Derek Robertson. Matthew was promoted to the opposition frontbench in 1990 and became a cabinet minister at the 1993 election when the Liberals won government. Two weeks after John Olsen successfully challenged Dean Brown for the premiership in 1996, Matthew was dropped from cabinet having refused to support Olsen becoming premier. Despite this, Matthew was re-appointed to cabinet following the 1997 election, until his party lost government under premier Rob Kerin at the 2002 election.

Matthew held many and varied cabinet and shadow portfolios from 1990 to 2005. In government, Matthew served at various times as a member of the Executive Council, Minister for Police, Minister for Emergency Services, Minister for Correctional Services, Minister for State Government Services, Minister for Administrative Services, Minister for Information Services, Minister for Year 2000 Compliance, Minister Assisting the Deputy Premier, and Minister for Minerals and Energy.

On 14 March 2005, Matthew announced that he would retire from Parliament at the 2006 election and in May 2005 subsequently stepped down from the shadow cabinet. Matthew was succeeded in Bright by Labor's Chloë Fox.

Matthew has worked as a Lobbyist since his retirement from Parliament.
