= Greg Mackie =

Australian businessman and cultural entrepreneur

Greg Mackie OAM
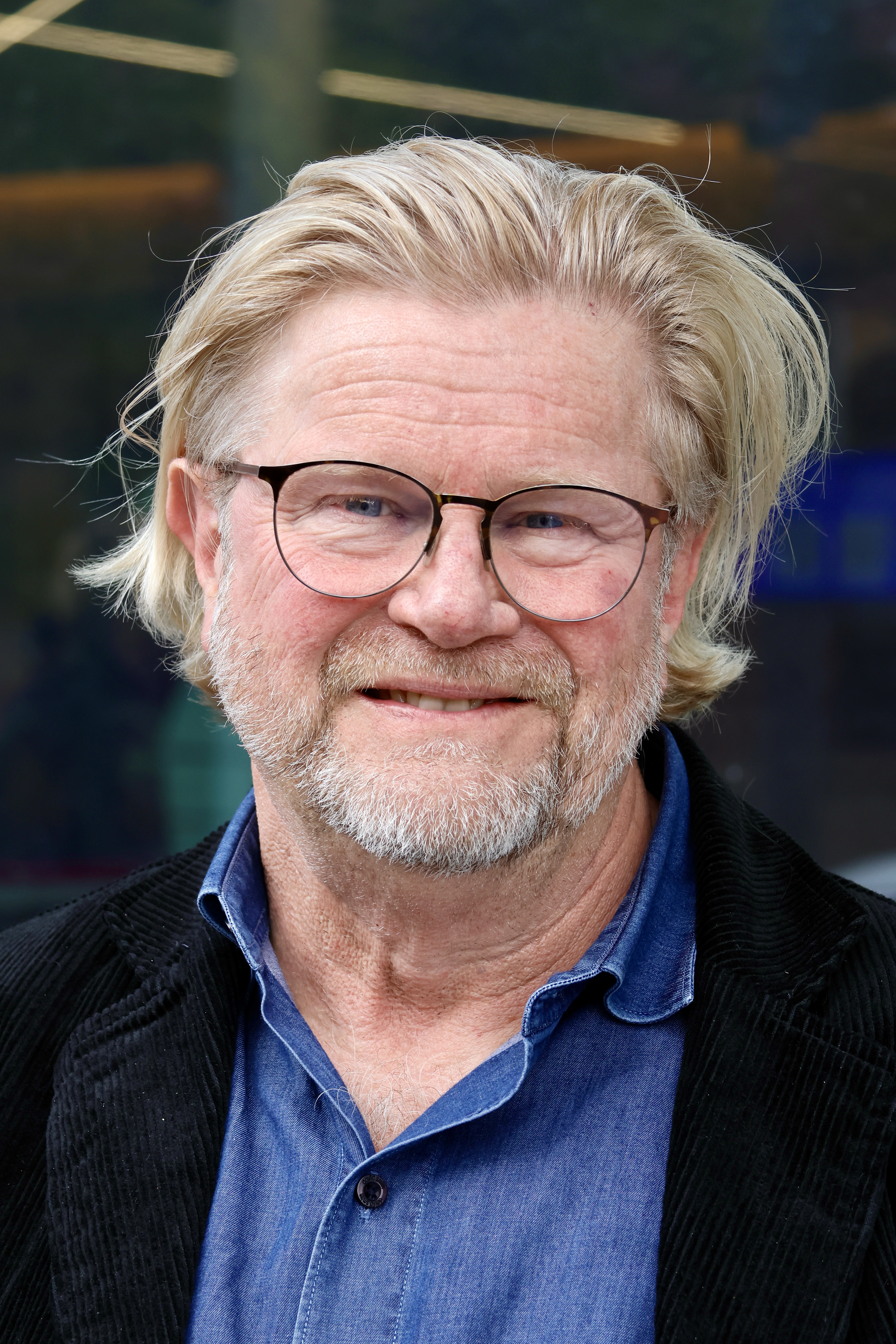
- Mackie in 2026

Member of the Adelaide City Council for Central Ward
- In office 13 May 2020 – 14 June 2022
- In office 16 May 2000 – 12 May 2003

Personal details
- Born: Gregory Alan Mackie
- Domestic partner: Jonathan Lambert
- Education: Flinders University (BA)
- Occupation: Businessman; public sector leader; cultural entrepreneur
- Website: gregmackie.com.au

Gregory Alan Mackie is an Australian businessman, public sector leader and cultural entrepreneur.

Mackie began his working life in retail before co-founding Imprints Booksellers in Adelaide in 1984 and later studying at Flinders University, where he graduated with a Bachelor of Arts. He also co-established the Art Zone Gallery in 1986 and was involved with Adelaide Writers' Week, the Feast Festival and the development of Adelaide's West End. In 1999, he founded the Adelaide Festival of Ideas Association and became its chairman, and was appointed Arts Ambassador for South Australia. Mackie was elected to the Adelaide City Council in 2000, where he served until 2003 and was involved in the permanent flying of the Australian and Aboriginal flags in Victoria Square. He subsequently held senior roles in South Australia's arts and public administration, including executive director of Arts SA and Deputy Chief Executive of the Department of the Premier and Cabinet under Premier Mike Rann.

Mackie became chief executive of the History Trust of South Australia in 2016 after working in SA Health and as a consultant. During his tenure, he directed the 2019 Epic Flight Centenary project, which relocated a Vickers Vimy aircraft to Adelaide Airport. He returned to the Adelaide City Council in 2020 as a Central Ward councillor, advocating for cultural development, urban planning, greening and the Adelaide Park Lands. He resigned from the council in 2022, and retired as chief executive of the History Trust in 2025.

== Early life and education ==
Gregory Alan Mackie is the son of Graham Miller, who, with his wife Gayle Miller and her friend Patricia Sykes, founded Imprints Booksellers at 80 Hindley Street, Adelaide, in 1984. Mackie began his working life in 1979 as a buyer for Myer SA Stores, where he remained until 1982, before becoming manager of Semprini's newsagency in Unley for a year. He studied at Flinders University and graduated with a Bachelor of Arts in 1987. While at university, he worked weekends at Imprints Booksellers and joined the business as a partner six months later.

== Career ==
=== Cultural organisations (1984–1999) ===
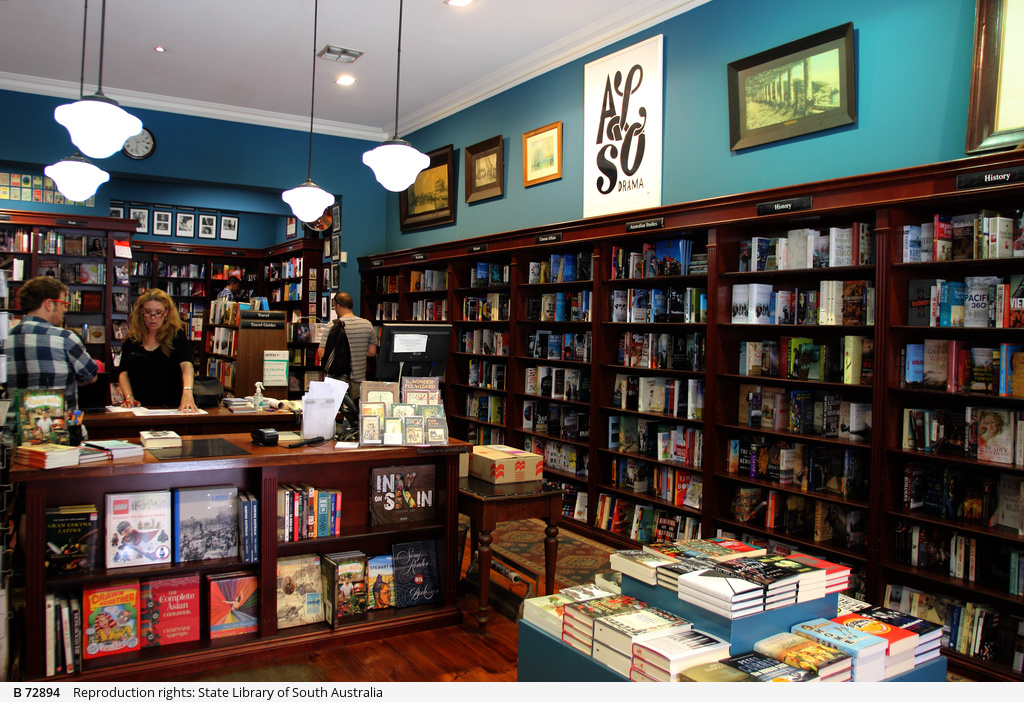
Interior of Imprints Booksellers in 2013

Mackie co-founded Imprints Booksellers in Adelaide in 1984 and served as its managing director until 2007. In 1986, he co-established the Art Zone Gallery, serving as its coordinator until 2000. He served on the Adelaide Writers' Week advisory committee for a decade, including as chair from 1994 to 1998, and was a board member of the Feast Festival from 1996 to 1999. During the 1990s, he founded the West End Association to promote Adelaide's West End. In 1999, Imprints moved to 107 Hindley Street, and Mackie founded the Adelaide Festival of Ideas Association, subsequently becoming its chairman. He was also appointed Arts Ambassador for South Australia that year.

=== Adelaide City Council and History Trust (2000–2019) ===
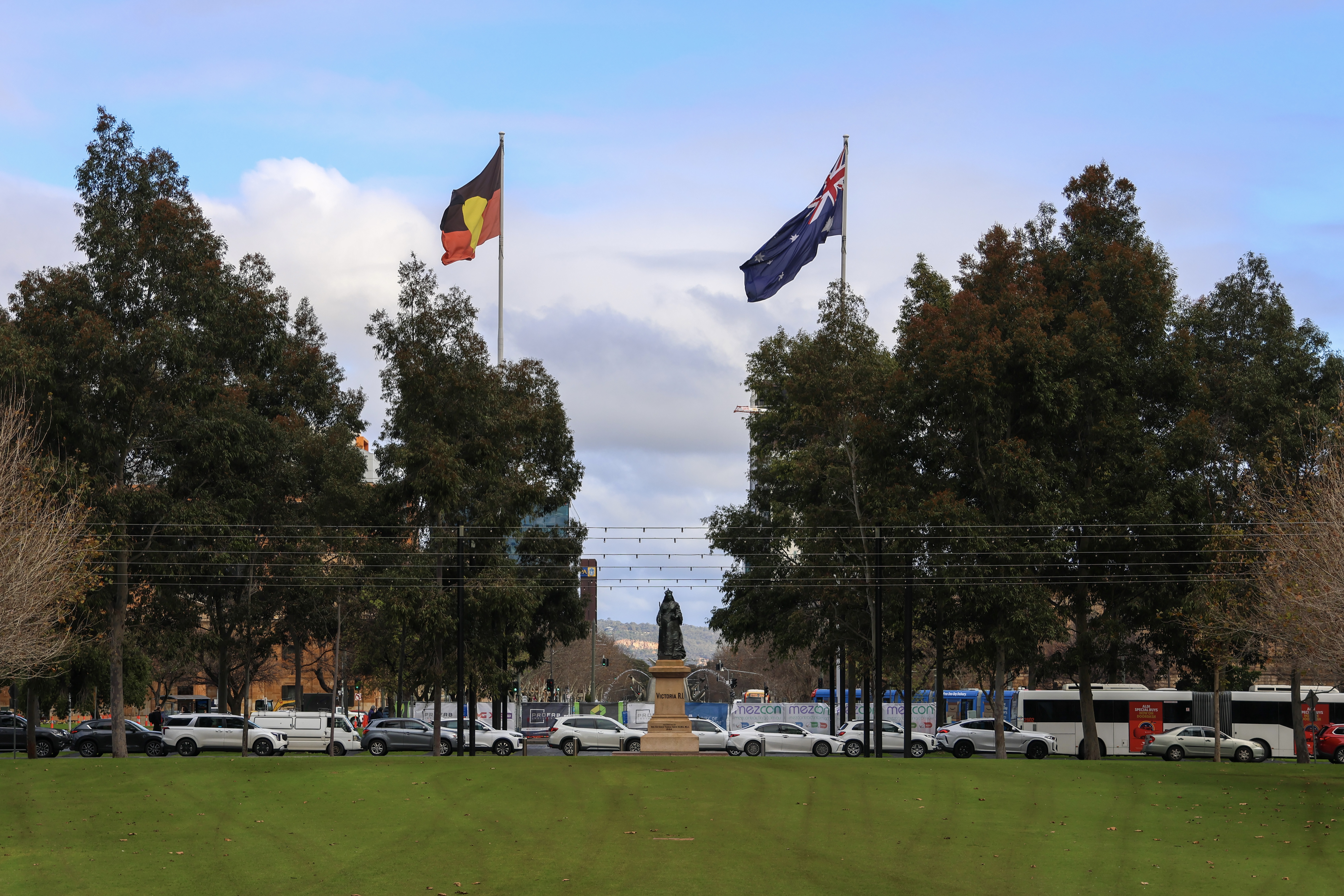
Aboriginal and Australian flags flying in Victoria Square, 21 August 2026

Mackie was elected to the Adelaide City Council for Central Ward on 16 May 2000 and served as a trustee of the Adelaide Festival Centre Trust from 2000 to 2003 and as a member of the University of South Australia Council. In 2002, he led an initiative to have the Australian and Aboriginal flags permanently flown in Victoria Square, working with the council's Reconciliation Committee and other supporters, and served on the Libraries Board of South Australia in 2002 and 2003. He lost his council seat following his defeat by Michael Harbison in the Adelaide lord mayoral election on 12 May 2003.

In January 2004, Mackie became executive director of Arts SA. In July 2005, he became a patron of the Don Dunstan Foundation, and in January 2006 was appointed interim director of the Adelaide Botanic Garden. Later that year, he worked with Premier Mike Rann and Minister for Disability Jay Weatherill to establish the Richard Llewellyn Arts and Disability Trust Fund. Mackie and Miller sold Imprints Booksellers in 2007 to Jason Lake and Katherine Woehlert. Mackie subsequently became Deputy Chief Executive of the South Australian Department of the Premier and Cabinet under Rann, with responsibilities including the Adelaide Thinkers in Residence program, the Capital City Committee Directorate and the Integrated Design Commission South Australia. He held the position from 2008 to 2011 and chaired the South Australian Premier's Communications Advisory Group from 2008 to 2013. In 2012, he moved to SA Health to head the Office for the Ageing, and from 2013 to 2015 worked as a freelance consultant. He also co-founded Cabaret Fringe Inc. and became its chairman.

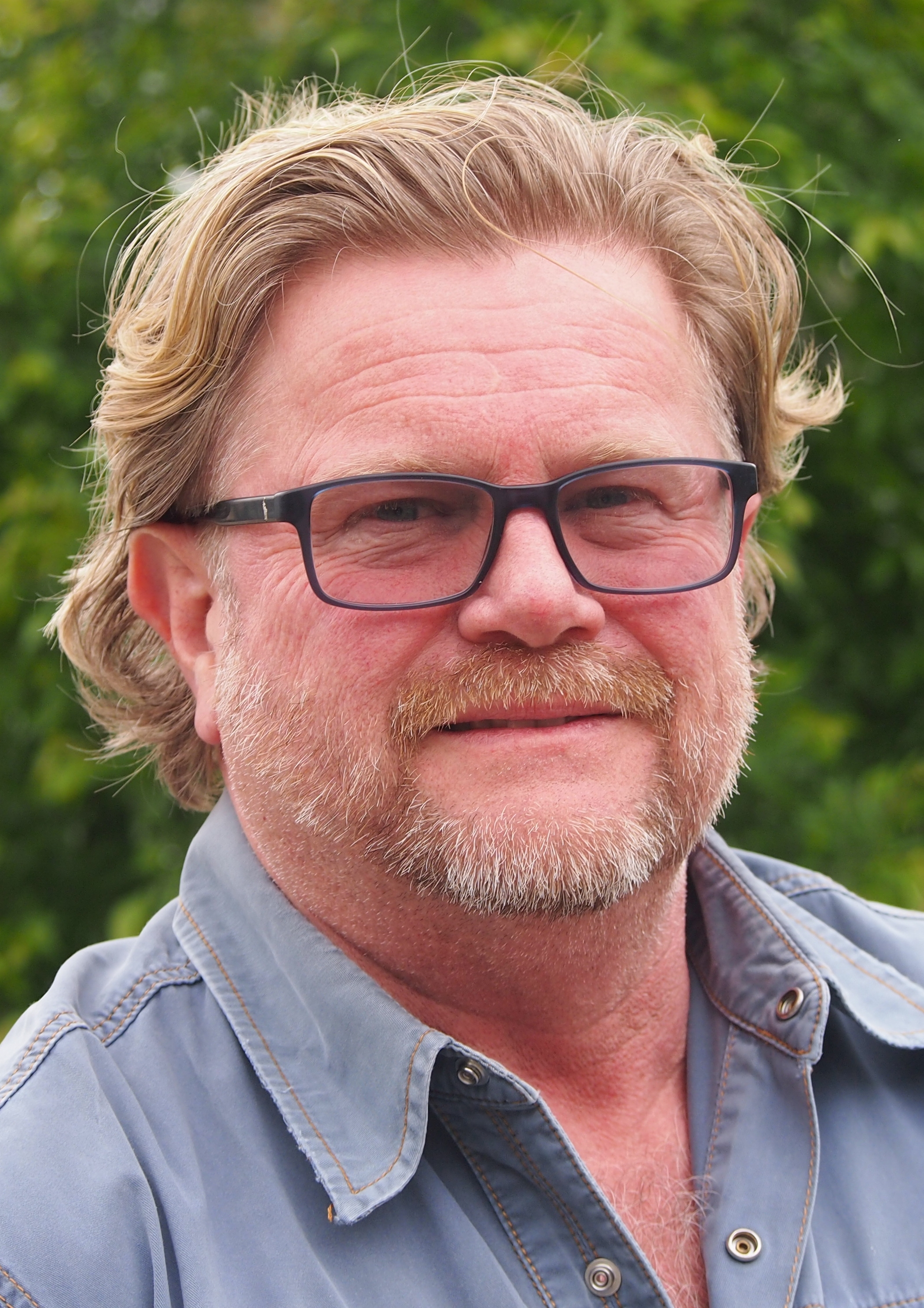
Mackie at the 2016 Friends of Parks Forum on 16 October

In March 2016, Mackie was appointed chief executive of the History Trust of South Australia, and commenced in the position in April. From 2018, the History Trust was accountable to the Minister of Education. In 2019, Mackie directed the Epic Flight Centenary project, which secured A$6 million in state and Commonwealth funding for the relocation of the Vickers Vimy aircraft to a new site at Adelaide Airport as part of the centenary commemorations of the Smith brothers' 1919 flight from England to Australia. During his tenure, the History Trust also developed online resources for teaching South Australian history, while Mackie advocated greater attention to the histories of Indigenous peoples, migration, democracy and technology.

=== Return to Adelaide City Council (2020–2022) ===
In May 2020, he returned to the Adelaide City Council after winning a Central Ward supplementary election following the resignation of Deputy Lord Mayor Houssam Abiad. Mackie received 28.2 per cent of first-preference votes, ahead of Wayne Chao on 20.2 per cent and Nathan Paine on 16.8 per cent, with voter turnout of approximately 19 per cent among 11,689 eligible ratepayers. His election was declared by the Electoral Commission of South Australia on 13 May and certified on 18 May. During the campaign, he supported a public art trust, reduced regulation for festivals and events, a 30-year landscape plan for the Adelaide Park Lands and changes to the city's precinct groups, while identifying the financial effects of the COVID-19 pandemic as an immediate priority.

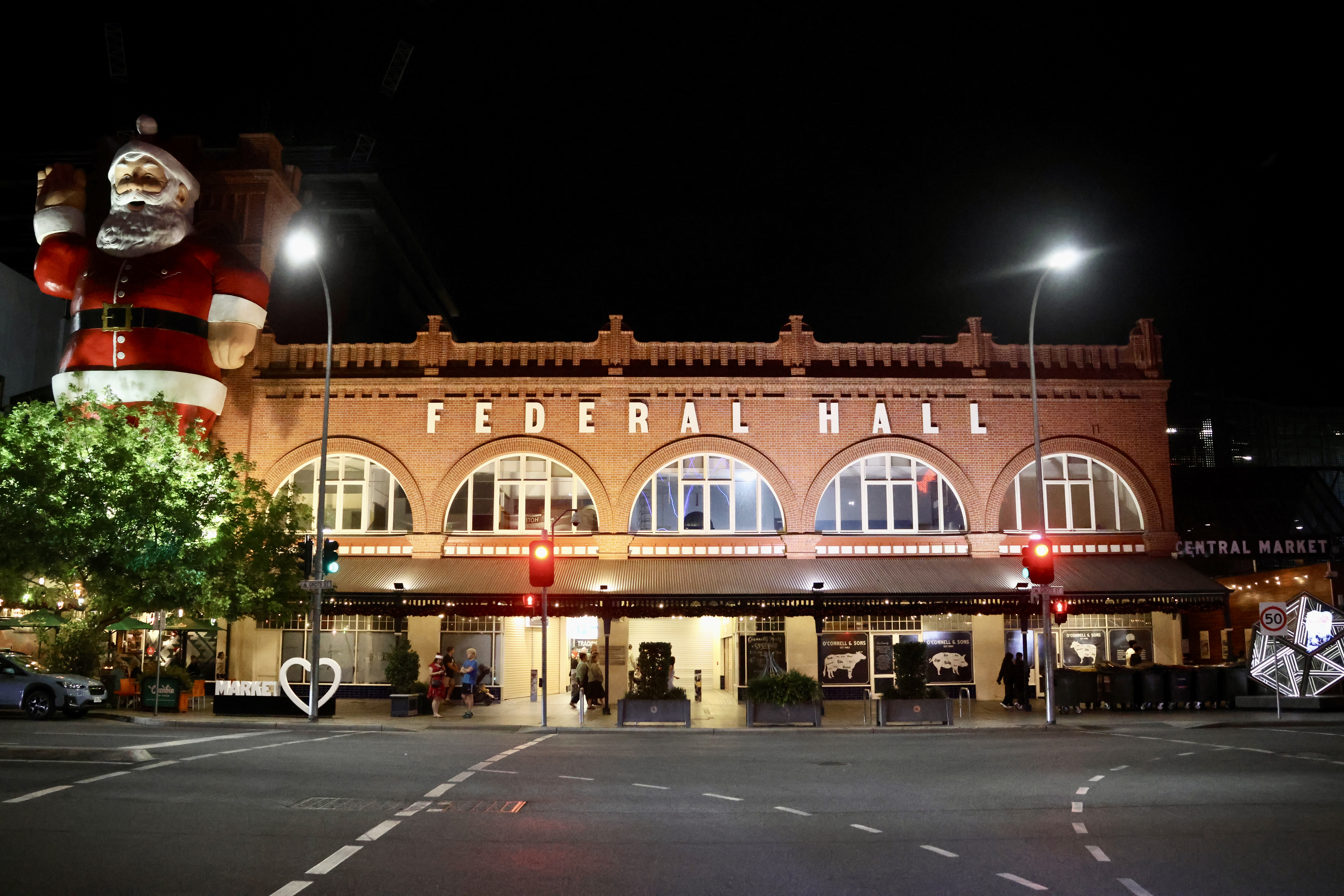
Santa Claus statue (left) on the Adelaide Central Market building in preparation for the 2025 Adelaide Christmas Pageant.

During his second term on the council, Mackie said he had generally adopted a conservative approach to voting rather than introducing motions on issues including arts and culture, planning and the redevelopment of Adelaide's West End. As Central Ward councillor, he advocated for Adelaide's cultural economy, encompassing the arts, entertainment, hospitality, tourism, education, public collections, festivals, sport and major events. He also supported a new plan for the City of Adelaide, urban greening and parkland-based urban design, and the development of Adelaide as a centre for museums, libraries and other collections. In March 2021, he moved a motion calling for an investigation into sexual harassment and sexual assault in Adelaide Town Hall. In May, he supported restoring and displaying the council-owned Santa Claus statue, although the motion was amended and the statue was subsequently transferred to the History Trust of South Australia. During this period, Mackie continued as chief executive of the History Trust, working nine days each fortnight in that role and estimating that he spent about 15 hours a week on council duties. He identified the limited time available for his council responsibilities as a constraint on his effectiveness.

On 14 June 2022, Mackie resigned from the Adelaide City Council with immediate effect, citing personal and professional reasons and concerns about the council's political environment. He had considered contesting the November 2022 Lord Mayor election but decided against doing so. Among the professional reasons for his resignation was the need to establish a permanent headquarters for the History Trust after the government decided not to relocate the organisation to Ayers House. Mackie also criticised the influence of the Team Adelaide voting group, which he said had contributed to divisions among elected members and limited debate, as well as changes to council meeting arrangements and the use of special meetings. Lord Mayor Sandy Verschoor disputed his criticism of the meeting arrangements, arguing that additional committee meetings allowed councillors to discuss matters with the administration before council decisions were made. Mackie's resignation occurred several months before the 2022 elections and did not result in a supplementary election to fill the vacancy.

=== Retirement and beyond (2025–present) ===
In August 2025, Mackie said that achieving Adelaide's target of 50,000 residents in the central business district and North Adelaide by 2036 would require significant high-rise development. Later that month, he announced his intention to step down as chief executive of the History Trust, and retired from the organisation in 2025. Following his retirement, he undertook mentoring and board work while continuing land restoration activities with his partner on the Fleurieu Peninsula. As of 2026, he serves on the board of the Art Museum of Kangaroo Island.

== Honours and awards ==
Mackie was awarded the Medal of the Order of Australia (OAM) in 2002 for service to the community through the promotion of the arts, particularly the Adelaide Festival of Ideas. In 2006, he received the Flinders University Distinguished Alumni Award, followed in 2007 by the Dame Elizabeth Murdoch Cultural Leadership Award for his work in strengthening relations between the arts and business. In 2015, he received the inaugural Jim Bettison and Helen James Foundation Award for his contribution to Australian cultural life.

== Personal life ==
Mackie is partnered with Jonathan Lambert. In 2016, he said he had become less active in cooking, partly because Lambert regularly cooked at home, and identified Mediterranean cuisine as his preferred style of cooking. In 2024, Mackie was diagnosed with melanoma, which was surgically removed with no indication that it had spread. Mackie and Lambert had also been undertaking reforestation on their bushland property near Cape Jervis for more than 30 years; they also maintained a home in Norwood.
