= 2027 South Australian local elections =

- 7 April 2027

67 of the 68 local government areas in South Australia
- Registered: 1,311,109

Local elections will be held on 7 April 2027 to elect the councils and mayors of 67 of the 68 local government areas (LGAs) of South Australia. The elections will be conducted by the Electoral Commission of South Australia (ECSA).

No election will be held in Roxby as it is served by an administrator who performs the functions of a council. An election for Coober Pedy is expected to be held for the first time since 2018, after the council was suspended in January 2019 and did not have an election in 2022.

== Date ==
Under South Australia's four-year terms process, these local elections were scheduled to be held on 11 November 2026, four years after the 2022 elections which were held on 12 November. However multiple issues were identified with the Electoral Commission of South Australia's performance managing the March 2026 state election, and the acting head of the agency requested the state government delay the local elections to mid-2027, so as to enable implementation of any recommendations stemming from an independent review into the state election.

On 16 June 2026 the government introduced legislation to delay the local elections to 7 April 2027, at which point voting would close.

== Electoral system ==
South Australian local elections use partial preferential voting (where voters must number at least the number of seats to be elected) and proportional representation. Voting is conducted entirely via post, and unlike for state and federal elections, it is not compulsory to vote.

Any person eligible to vote in state elections is automatically eligible to vote. Non-Australian citizens, business owners, occupiers of property and non-resident owners of property are able to apply for enrolment in local elections.

Beginning at the 2027 elections, all mayors will be directly-elected. Prior to this, some mayors were directly-elected, while others were chosen by councillors.

=== Donation disclosure forms ===
Following the 2022 elections, 45 council members (including three mayors) lost their positions as elected representatives after they did not submit a form about any gifts they received during their election campaigns. The councillors losing their office meant by-elections were required, with ratepayers in each council paying the costs.

In March 2023, the Local Government (Casual Vacancies) Amendment Bill 2023 was passed in the South Australian Parliament, which gave a 10-day extension to all affected council members. This avoided the requirement for by-elections, and meant that decisions made by councillors following the most recent elections (but before the disclosure deadline) remained valid.

== Candidates ==
=== Political parties ===
No political parties endorsed candidates at the 2022 local elections, including the Greens, who endorse in local government elections in all other states. The Greens last endorsed candidates at the 2010 local elections in Port Adelaide Enfield.

Since 2022, all candidates have been required to publicly disclose their political party membership.

== Party changes before elections ==
A number of councillors joined or left parties before the 2022 elections.

Council	Ward	Councillor	Former party	New party	Date
Adelaide	South	Henry Davis	Independent	Independent Liberal	13 October 2023
Holdfast Bay	Mayor	Amanda Wilson	Independent	Independent Liberal	11 October 2024
