= Anne Moran =

Australian politician

Councillor Anne Moran
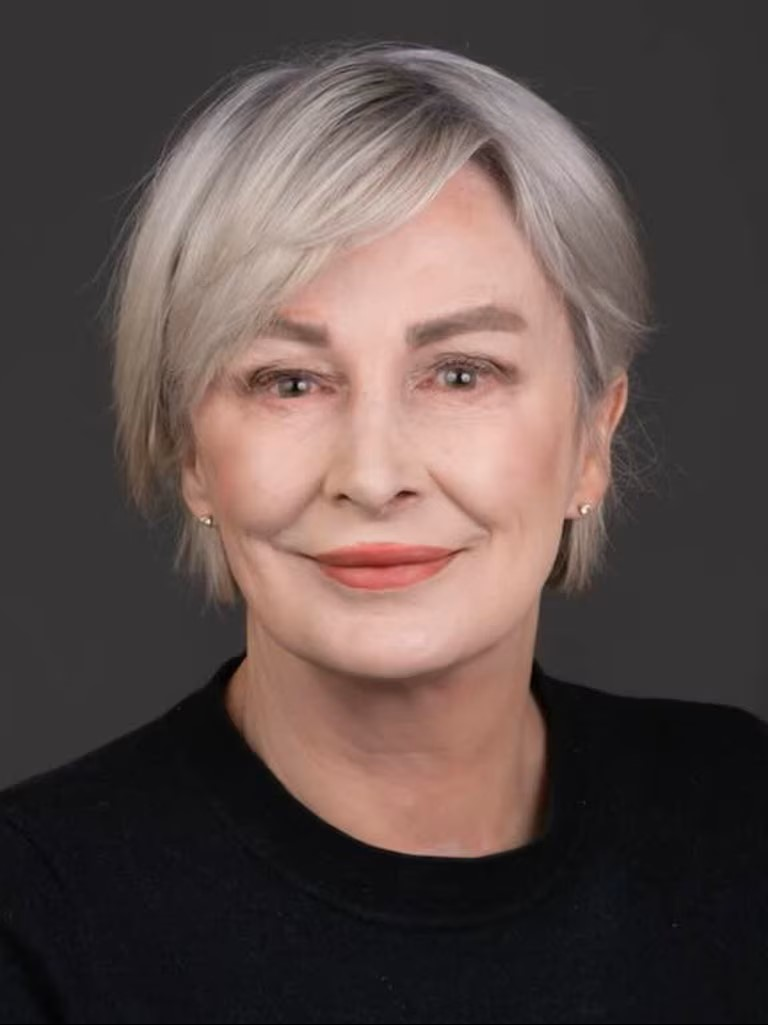

Deputy Lord Mayor of Adelaide
- In office 6 March 1999 – May 13, 2000
- Lord Mayor: Jane Lomax Smith
- Preceded by: Graham Inns AM
- Succeeded by: Michael Harbison

Councillor of the City of Adelaide
- In office 6 May 1995 – 14 November 2022

Personal details
- Born: 6 February 1955 (age 71) Barmera, South Australia
- Party: Independent
- Spouse: Patrick Moran
- Children: Yvette, Nick and Charles
- Education: Flinders University; University of Adelaide
- Occupation: Teacher; Councillor; Businesswoman

Anne Moran (born February 6, 1955) is a businesswoman, teacher and former local government politician. She served on the City of Adelaide Council from 1995 to 2022, including as Deputy Lord Mayor from 1999 to 2000. Moran was the first female councillor to achieve 25 years of continuous service with the City of Adelaide.

Moran has been described as a "fearless advocate for her community" who "never backed down from a stoush" who was also criticised as being an "opposer of almost everything that could be construed as modern development".

== Early life ==
Moran was born in Barmera, South Australia on 6 February 1955. The daughter of a General practitioner, the family moved to Adelaide when she was eight years old. She attended Rose Park Primary School and later St Peter's Girls' School. She spent a year in and out of the Adelaide Children's Hospital being treated for Rheumatic fever.

Moran studied English and History at Flinders University and the University of Adelaide and become a teacher working across Adelaide High School, Henley High School, and Norwood International High School. She once told The Advertiser she was an "absolutely shocking" teacher because she "couldn't keep them in their seats".

== Local Government career ==
Moran's entrance into local politics came while campaigning to protect a two-storey bluestone building on the corner of Hutt and Wakefield Street which housed the House of Chow restaurant. She participated in a 78-day vigil to save the structure and presented Council with a 400-person-strong petition. The building was razed in July 1991. The demolition of the building triggered a wave of interest in heritage preservation at the Adelaide City Council.

Moran contested one of two positions in Robe Ward on the Adelaide City Council in 1993 but narrowly lost. She would go on to be elected in 1995. Serving under Lord Mayor of Adelaide Henry Ninio, the two clashed over opposing views on urban development and heritage conservation. After Ninio was forced to relinquish his role as principal spokesperson for the council, Moran emerged as one of the council's new figureheads. She was a critic of the Council paying $20,000 to employ a public relations person to become its official spokesperson.

In 1997, Jane Lomax-Smith was elected Lord Mayor. Lomax-Smith's pro-heritage agenda saw 1300 properties added to the Local Heritage Register, of which Moran was a supporter. In 1999, she became Deputy Lord Mayor - the first time two women had held senior leadership roles on the council for the first time in history.

Moran had been a vocal about the future of the old LeCornu Furniture store site at 88 O'Connell Street in North Adelaide, mostly around the height and size of any such development. Since 1989, the site had been subject to at least six different plans, ranging in height from six to eight storeys. The piece of land became a long-running urban planning and community concern in North Adelaide. The Council considered buying the site in 2001, but later abandoned plans. Speaking about concerns about the height of proposals, Moran told The Advertiser: "I'd imagine that this tall building could look into everybody's back yard from here to Prospect".

In 2017, the Council under Lord Mayor Martin Haese voted to buy the site from developer Con Makris, alongside Premier Jay Weatherill. Moran at the time told the ABC: "The perfect solution would have been for the developers to develop within the plan rather than outside the plan, or a compulsory acquisition, but neither of those were forthcoming." Moran was one of a two councillors who criticised the City of Adelaide Council for keeping a chosen developer for the site confidential, claiming it was in the public interest. She later accused the Council of "gagging" her and fellow councillor Philip Martin.

Moran unsuccessfully contested the 2022 Adelaide City Council election, losing her spot as an Area Councillor to former union boss Janet Giles. This was her first election loss in 27 years.

In 2025, she announced she would contest the Central Ward by-election, saying she had learned her lesson from a previously disruptive term of Council. She ran on the platform of a return to a focus on core services of "rates, roads and rubbish" and Park Lands protection. Moran was unsuccessful, securing just 4.6% of first preference votes.

== Controversies ==
=== ‘Pamela Anderson Boulevard’ ===
In 2001, the Adelaide City Council would vote on renaming the section of Burbridge Road between the city centre and Tapleys Hill Road after Sir Donald Bradman. Moran voted against the proposal saying: "will we start calling them after Hollywood stars … should we have Pamela Anderson Boulevard?’’ The name change to Sir Donald Bradman Drive took effect on January 1, 2001. She also opposed renaming a section of King William Road after former Premier Don Dunstan.

=== Code of conduct complaint ===
Moran was subject to a code of conduct complaint from the Adelaide City Council's head of media, David Hill, after she publicly criticised the public relations chief's media strategy following a FIVEAA morning radio segment. In the segment, the announcers blamed noise complaints from North Adelaide residents for Soundwave promoters losing their $10,000 bond. Moran alleged Soundwave flouted noise regulations and sent an email to Hill urging him to correct the reports, while copying in journalists from The Advertiser. "This continual bashing of us and our residents is unacceptable and has become an urban myth believed by most of the state. North Adelaide has been undeservedly putting up with this bull***t for years and it has become damaging to the image of Council and Councilors (sic),” she wrote, in an email." Hill subsequently resigned from his role and the outcome was never determined.

=== Formal complaint ===
In 2019, Councillor Arman Abrahimzadeh filed a complaint against Moran for calling him a "d***head" and "dropping the f-bomb in the chamber". The complaint came a week after the South Australian ombudsman issued a memo to local councillors to refrain from lodging trivial complaints. Moran called the complaint "vexatious" and that she didn't "realise he was so sensitive". Moran also pointed to comments from Houssam Abiad that she was a "dinosaur" and likening her to Pauline Hanson. Abrahimzadeh later withdrew his complaint following a failed mediation session.

=== Misconduct finding ===
In 2020, the Independent Commissioner Against Corruption found Moran had breached the act by leaking confidential information about a proposed bid to host the Commonwealth Games in Adelaide in 2026. The finding related to quotes Moran gave InDaily after a closed-door meeting where she argued the discussion never warranted confidentiality as "there was no costings mentioned". SA Ombudsman Wayne Lines said it was not up to Moran to make that assessment. Moran called the finding "pathetic" and said she would run for Lord Mayor in 2022 if any members of the Team Adelaide faction decided to contest the position.

=== Australia Day fireworks ===
In 2020, Moran proposed a ban on all fireworks in the City of Adelaide, including at sporting events, as a mark of respect to victims and firefighters impacted by the bushfires. The move came on the heels of the Australia Day fireworks celebration at Elder Park. During a lengthy email exchange, other councillors argued the council was not responsible for fireworks and the event would raise money for the Red Cross. Moran called this "pathetic" and argued "also fireworks are extremely upsetting to some of the new immigrants because they remind them of the bombing and wars they have been traumatised by". Deputy Lord Mayor Alex Hyde described the comment as "absurd" and "extremely distasteful". The motion was ultimately lost due to a lack of a quorum.

=== Debate over emails ===
In April 2021, Moran threatened Team Adelaide's Alex Hyde with legal action for reading emails she had authored at a public council meeting. Hyde attempted to table 170 emails before Lord Mayor Sandy Verschoor during a discussion on tackling bad behaviour within the organisation. The emails included Moran describing Hyde as "a loser", "cringeworthy", "a lightweight who should zip it", "rude little shorty", "tool", "distasteful" and "Napoleon". Moran had earlier told the Council its culture was the worst she had seen in her 26 years as an elected member. "I have never seen anything like it on my time on council." In 2022, Moran again came under a fire for her email content when it was reported she sent a colleague an email reading: "Grow up. You are in a political environment not a tea park (sic). Constantly accusing me of bullying is bullying."

== Personal life ==
Moran lives in Adelaide with her anaesthetist husband Patrick Moran; who is a member of the Next Generation Memorial Drive gym. The couple lived in North Adelaide for 31 years in a 1880-era bluestone villa. They sold the property for $4.36 million in 2023. They have three children: Yvette, Nick and Charles.

A lifelong smoker, Moran now uses an electronic cigarette. She has also publicly stated an appreciation for McDonald's.
