= Allan Holmes =

Allan Holmes may refer to:

- Allan Holmes (footballer) (born 1952), Australian rules footballer
- Allan Holmes (lawyer) (1845–1909), New Zealand cricketer and lawyer
- Allan Holmes (public servant) (born 1954), South Australian public servant
