= Martin Haese =

Australian educator and entrepreneur (born 1965)

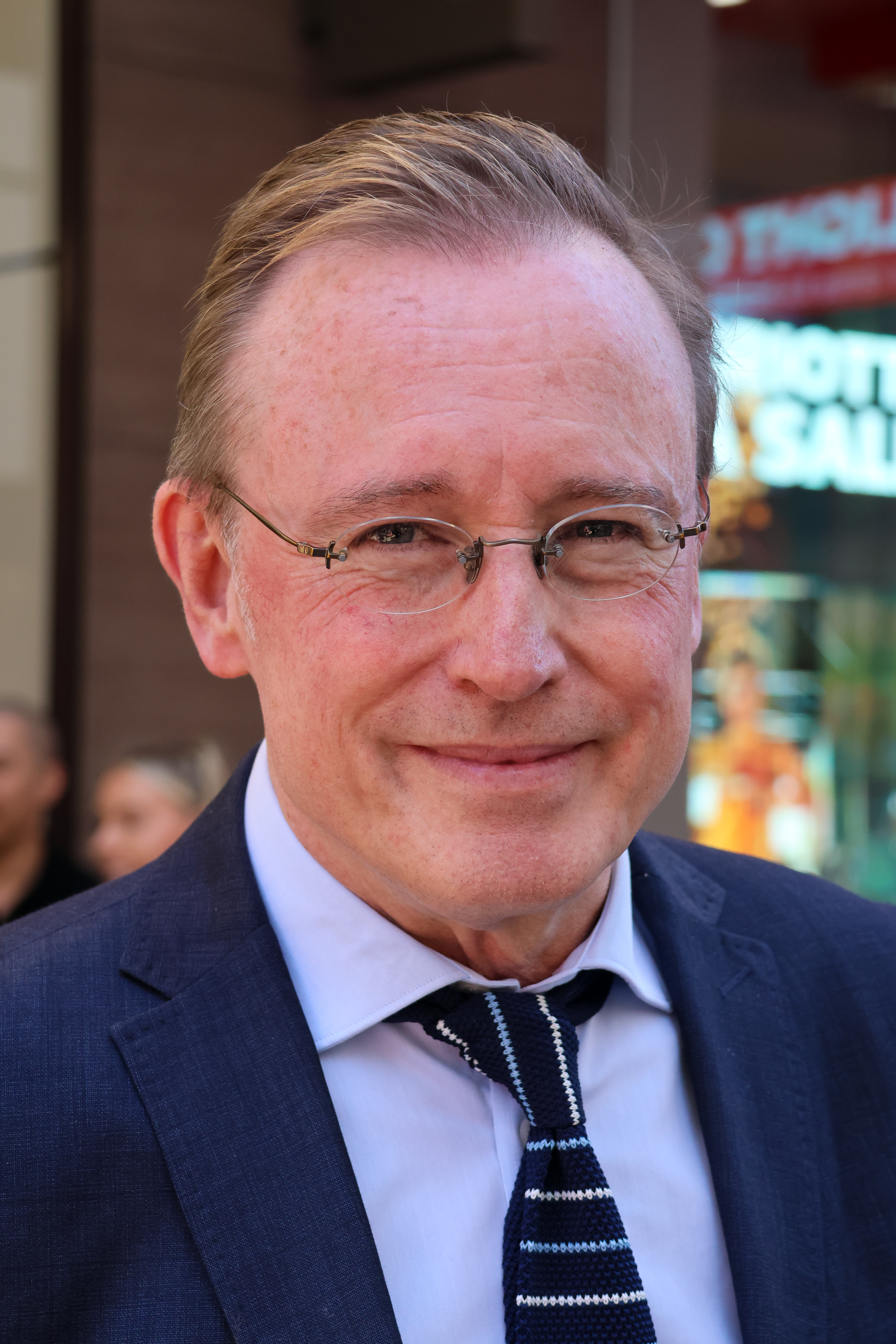
- Haese in 2026

Lord Mayor of Adelaide
- In office 18 November 2014 – 11 November 2018
- Deputy: Natasha Malani; Houssam Abiad; Megan Hender; Sandy Verschoor
- Preceded by: Stephen Yarwood
- Succeeded by: Sandy Verschoor

Personal details
- Born: Martin Kinnear Haese; 1965 (age 60–61) Adelaide, South Australia, Australia
- Spouse: Genevieve Theseira (m. 2010)
- Education: Australian Institute of Business (MBA)
- Occupation: Businessman; entrepreneur
- Website: martinhaese.com
- Martin Haese's voice Haese introducing Chris Bowen at a conference Recorded 8 May 2025

Martin Kinnear Haese (born 1965) is an Australian businessman and entrepreneur who served as Lord Mayor of Adelaide from 2014 to 2018.

Haese was born in Adelaide, and his godmother was Roma Mitchell, with whom he remained in contact while growing up. In 1993, Haese established YouthWorks, an urban youth fashion business that expanded to 16 stores before being sold in 2005. He later obtained an Master of Business Administration and worked as a consultant. From 2010 to 2013, he was general manager of the Rundle Mall Management Authority and from 2010 to 2014 chaired the Bay to Birdwood event.

Haese was elected Lord Mayor of Adelaide on 8 November 2014, defeating incumbent Stephen Yarwood, and served until 11 November 2018, when he was succeeded by Sandy Verschoor. During his term, he chaired the Council of Capital City Lord Mayors in 2015 and was involved in initiatives concerning carbon neutrality, city infrastructure, cycling and economic development. In December 2018, he became chair of the Premier's Climate Change Council, and in May 2019 was appointed chief executive of Business SA. He left Business SA in 2022 and subsequently served on the South Australian Motor Sport Board and as honorary chairman of the Clipper Ship City of Adelaide. In March 2023, he was appointed South Australia's Trade and Investment Special Envoy to Singapore and South-East Asia.

== Early life and education ==
Martin Kinnear Haese was born in Adelaide in 1965 to Cecily and David Haese, a lawyer who later served as a judge of the Industrial Court and the Family Court of Australia. His father was a partner in a Waymouth Street law firm with Roma Mitchell, Ted Mullighan and Doreen Davey, and Mitchell was Haese's godmother. At the age of 10, Haese lived opposite Anne Moran. He maintained contact with Mitchell while growing up and continued to see her after his father's death in 1985, including at Government House and family gatherings. Mitchell advised him when he was considering studying law, but he instead pursued a career in business.

== Career ==
=== Early career (1993–2014) ===
In 1993, at the age of 27, Haese established YouthWorks, an urban youth fashion business, opening his first store in Rundle Mall. The business expanded into a franchise with 16 stores in Adelaide and Melbourne and more than 200 employees before it was sold in 2005. In 1998, he co-founded the South Australian chapter of the Entrepreneurs' Organization, and in 2001 he was appointed to the South Australian Youth Arts Board. During his early thirties, Haese addressed a fear of public speaking by accepting invitations to speak to business and community organisations.

Haese later obtained a Master of Business Administration from the Australian Institute of Business and worked as a consultant. From 2010 to 2013, he was general manager of the Rundle Mall Management Authority, a subsidiary of the City of Adelaide, where he was involved in the introduction of public holiday trading and the development of a proposal for a A$30 million public realm upgrade. From 2010 to 2014, he served as chairman of the Bay to Birdwood motoring event and held positions on boards including the Adelaide Convention Bureau.

=== Lord Mayor of Adelaide (2014–2018) ===
On 8 November 2014, Haese was elected Lord Mayor of Adelaide, defeating incumbent Stephen Yarwood by 218 votes after preferences were distributed. Yarwood led on first preferences, but Haese won the final count. At 49, Haese became the 63rd person to hold the office, with voter turnout recorded at 36 per cent. During the campaign, he contributed about half of his approximately $30,000 campaign budget and said that his donors had not expected policy changes in return for their contributions. Following his election, he identified council unity, engagement with the business community, debt and overhead management, infrastructure, internal efficiencies and economic activity as priorities. He also proposed making Adelaide more supportive of entrepreneurship, establishing a council retail department, providing seed funding for businesses, managing competition from food trucks and pop-up businesses, reducing city speed limits and improving traffic-light management. Haese was formally sworn in at an investiture ceremony on 18 November, overseen by Chief Justice Chris Kourakis.

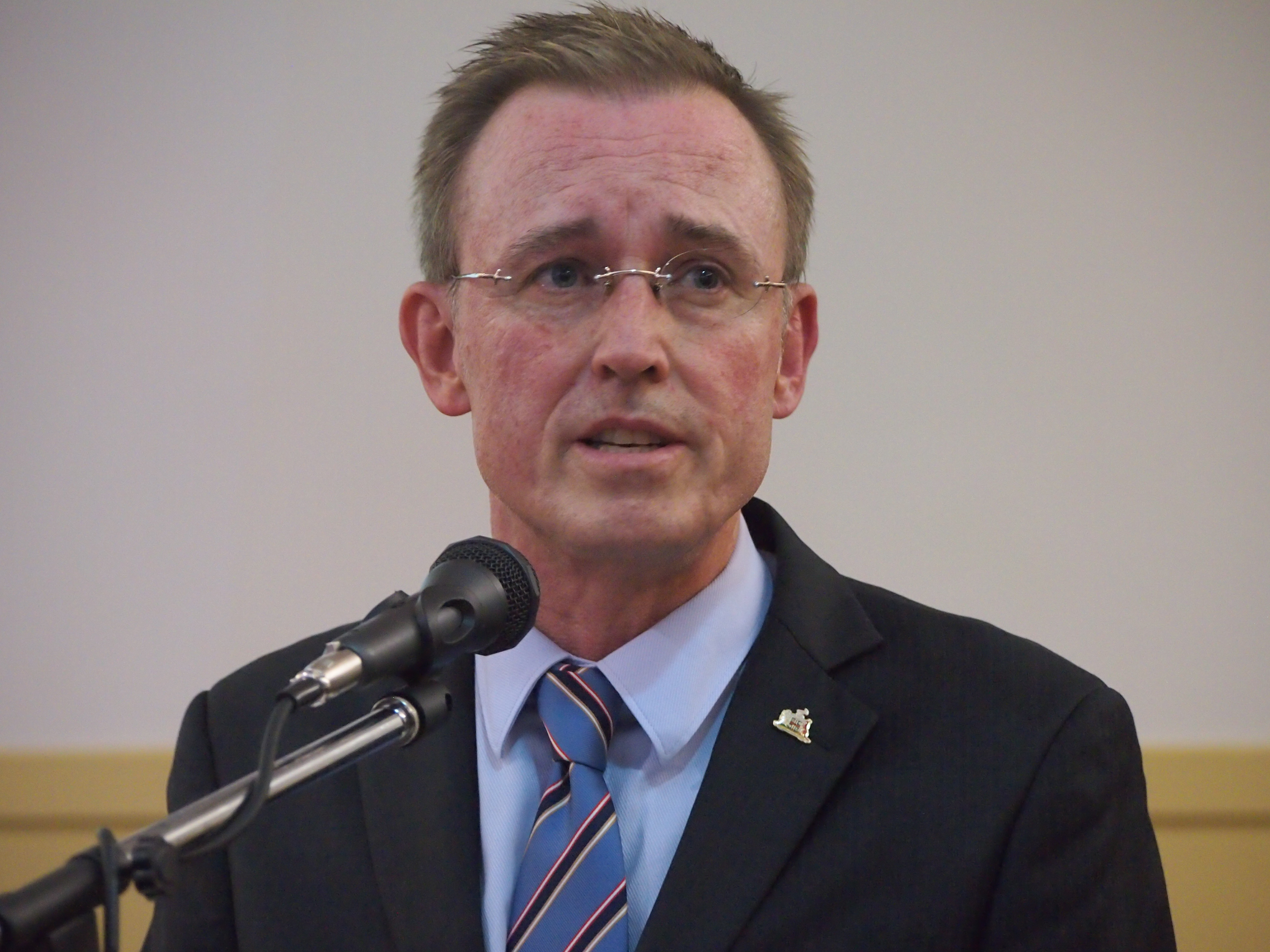
Haese speaking at the launch of the 2016 South Australia's History Festival at the Torrens Parade Ground

In 2015, Haese chaired the Council of Capital City Lord Mayors. In November, he signed an agreement with Premier Jay Weatherill following the City of Adelaide's approval of its Carbon Neutral Strategy 2015–2025, establishing a pathway towards carbon neutrality. He attended the United Nations Climate Change Conference in Paris in December and promoted the city's target of achieving carbon neutrality by 2025. During his term, he also considered issues including the future of Victoria Square, food trucks and temporary businesses, local government voting arrangements, city speed limits and the Frome Street bikeway. In 2016, he supported expanding bicycle infrastructure through additional bicycle tracks, an east-west bicycle route and expansion of the Adelaide Free Bikes program, and proposed an honorary "Night Mayor" to represent the city's night-time economy. He also supported retaining existing local heritage legislation while allowing further discussion of proposed reforms.

In 2017, Haese outlined council priorities including increasing Adelaide's residential population and workforce, heritage conservation, redevelopment of the former Royal Adelaide Hospital site and infrastructure projects at Bank Street, Topham Mall, Gawler Place and the Frome Bikeway, as well as tram extensions. The Carbon Neutral Adelaide Action Plan was announced in 2016 by the state government and council, and in 2017 Haese announced the selection of Cool or Cosy to supply and install solar photovoltaic systems under the Solar Savers Adelaide initiative. He continued to oppose proposed changes to heritage legislation and advocated financial and other assistance for owners maintaining heritage properties. In November, he opposed a proposed $600,000 lighting installation at the River Torrens and resisted residential development in the riverbank area. In December, the council under Haese approved the purchase of the former Le Cornu showroom site on O'Connell Street, North Adelaide, for $34 million, with Haese describing the transaction as a commercial decision intended to facilitate development of the site and surrounding precinct. The same month, the City of Adelaide launched 10 Gigabit Adelaide, a fibre optic network developed with TPG that provided businesses in the CBD and North Adelaide with access to speeds of up to 10 gigabits per second.

In 2018, Haese continued to support 10 Gigabit Adelaide, which he said strengthened the city's business infrastructure and contributed to attracting Technicolor's Mill Film studio. During the campaign for the 2018 South Australian state election, he lobbied the major political parties on issues including the Adelaide Park Lands, tourism, heritage, infrastructure, business and city development. He continued to oppose the Riverbank Authority's proposed lighting displays, including an interactive installation that had been approved for $600,000. In September, Haese withdrew his candidacy for a second term as Lord Mayor, citing personal reasons, after having begun campaigning for re-election. He remained in office until the local government election and said he did not intend to enter politics in the immediate future. Several candidates he supported through Team Adelaide were elected to the new council. Haese left office on 11 November 2018 and was succeeded by Sandy Verschoor.

=== Later career (2018–present) ===
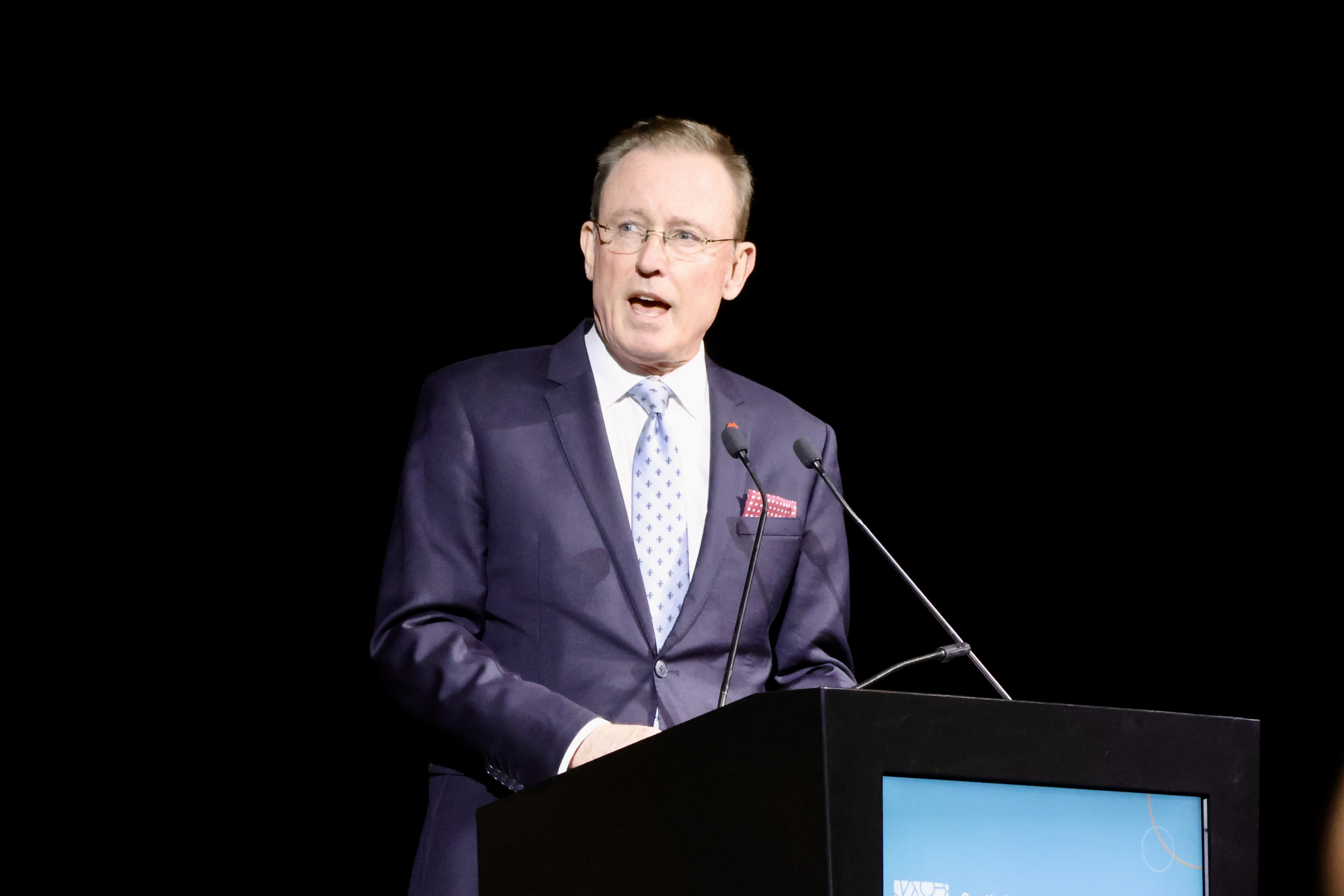
Haese at the Industry Climate Change Conference 2025, Adelaide Convention Centre

In December 2018, following his decision not to seek a second term as Lord Mayor, Haese was appointed chair of the Premier's Climate Change Council, an advisory body on greenhouse gas emissions, climate change and sustainability. In early 2019, he was reported to be considering an independent candidacy for the federal seat of Adelaide, although he did not contest the election. In May 2019, he became Chief Executive of Business SA, succeeding Nigel McBride. In March 2020, he was appointed to the Marshall government's Industry Response and Recovery Council, established as part of the state's response to the economic effects of the COVID-19 pandemic.

While leading Business SA, Haese continued as chair of the Premier's Climate Change Council and served on the Australian Broadband Advisory Council and the South Australian chapter of the Entrepreneurs' Organization. In August 2021, he was a member of the Australian Broadband Advisory Council, which advised the federal government on the economic and social benefits of high-speed broadband. In May 2021, he ruled himself out of consideration for the vacant Business SA chief executive position following his eventual departure. On 3 March 2022, Haese announced that he would leave Business SA and return to the private sector. Later that month, he called for temporary relief from fringe benefits tax on meals and entertainment to support Adelaide CBD's businesses during the COVID-19 recovery. In September 2022, he was appointed to the South Australian Motor Sport Board, established to oversee the return and longer-term development of the Adelaide 500. In 2022, he also received an honorary chairmanship of the Clipper Ship City of Adelaide, having previously been associated with the vessel as Lord Mayor and unveiled its replica coat of arms in 2015.

In March 2023, Haese was appointed by the Malinauskas government as South Australia's Trade and Investment Special Envoy to Singapore and South-East Asia for a two-year term, working under Trade and Investment Minister Nick Champion. As of 2026, he is chair of the Adelaide Motorsport Festival and a member of the Rhodes Scholarship selection committee for Adelaide University.

== Personal life ==
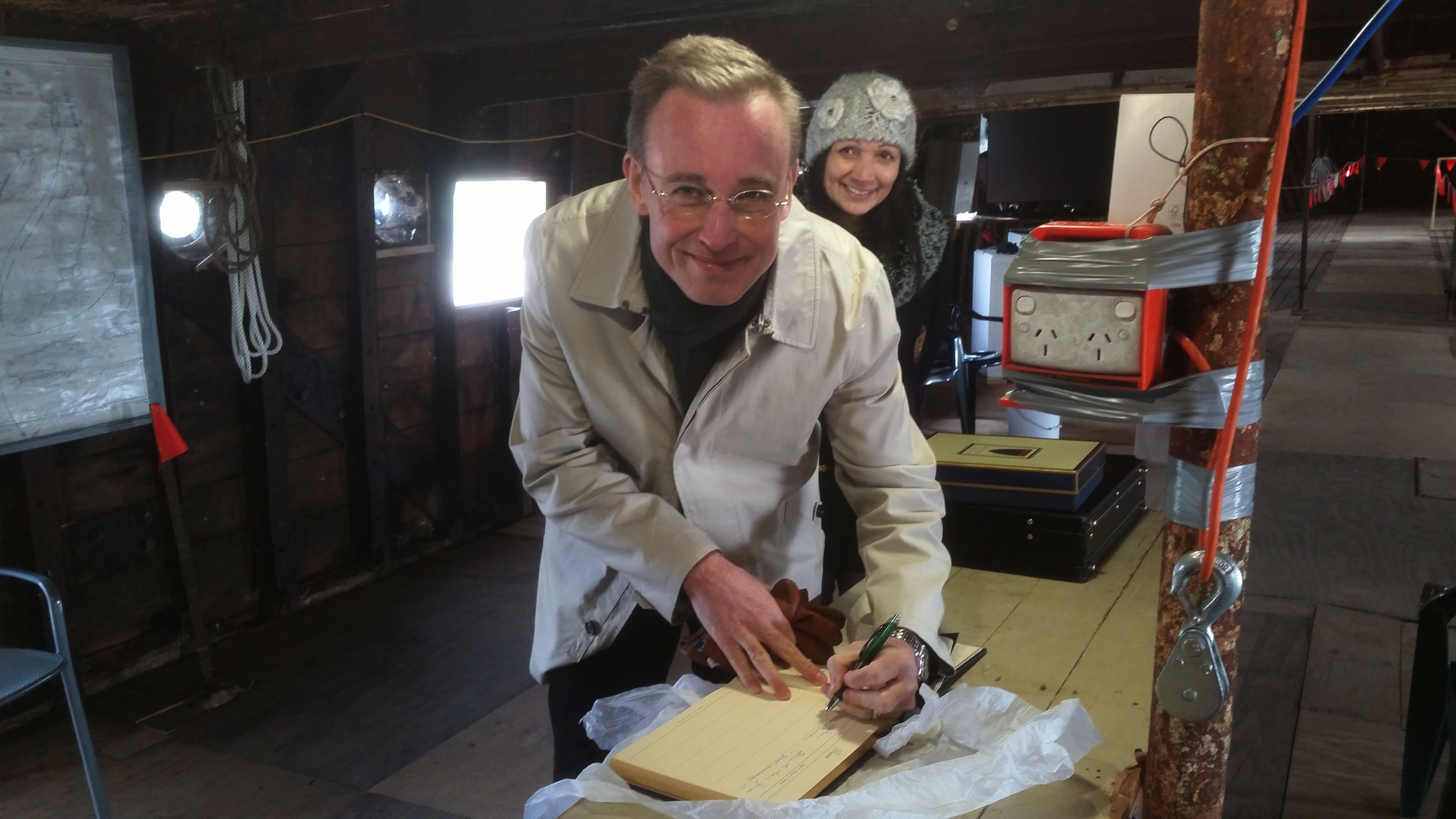
Haese and Theseira signing the visitor book aboard the City of Adelaide, 2015

Haese married for the first time in 1998, but the marriage ended after three years. He met Genevieve Theseira, a Singapore-born entrepreneur, at a conference in the Philippines in 2000, and they married in January 2010. They share interests in the arts, music, cycling, heritage and cultural tourism.

Haese began playing guitar at about the age of 10 and also plays piano and other instruments. In 2015, he performed at the New Year's Eve concert at Elder Park, following Adelaide's designation as a UNESCO City of Music.

Haese developed an interest in classic cars during childhood, when he washed his father and grandfather's Holdens. He later became a collector and acquired vehicles including a 1969 Jensen Interceptor, a 1967 Jaguar 420G and a 1967 Vanden Plas Princess. He has restored and maintained the cars with assistance from specialists and has supported preservation activities and motoring clubs, which he associates with cultural tourism and employment.

Civic offices
Preceded by Stephen Yarwood	Lord Mayor of Adelaide; 2014 – 2018	Succeeded by Sandy Verschoor
