= Rebecca Hewett =

Australian politician

The Honourable Rebecca Hewett MLC
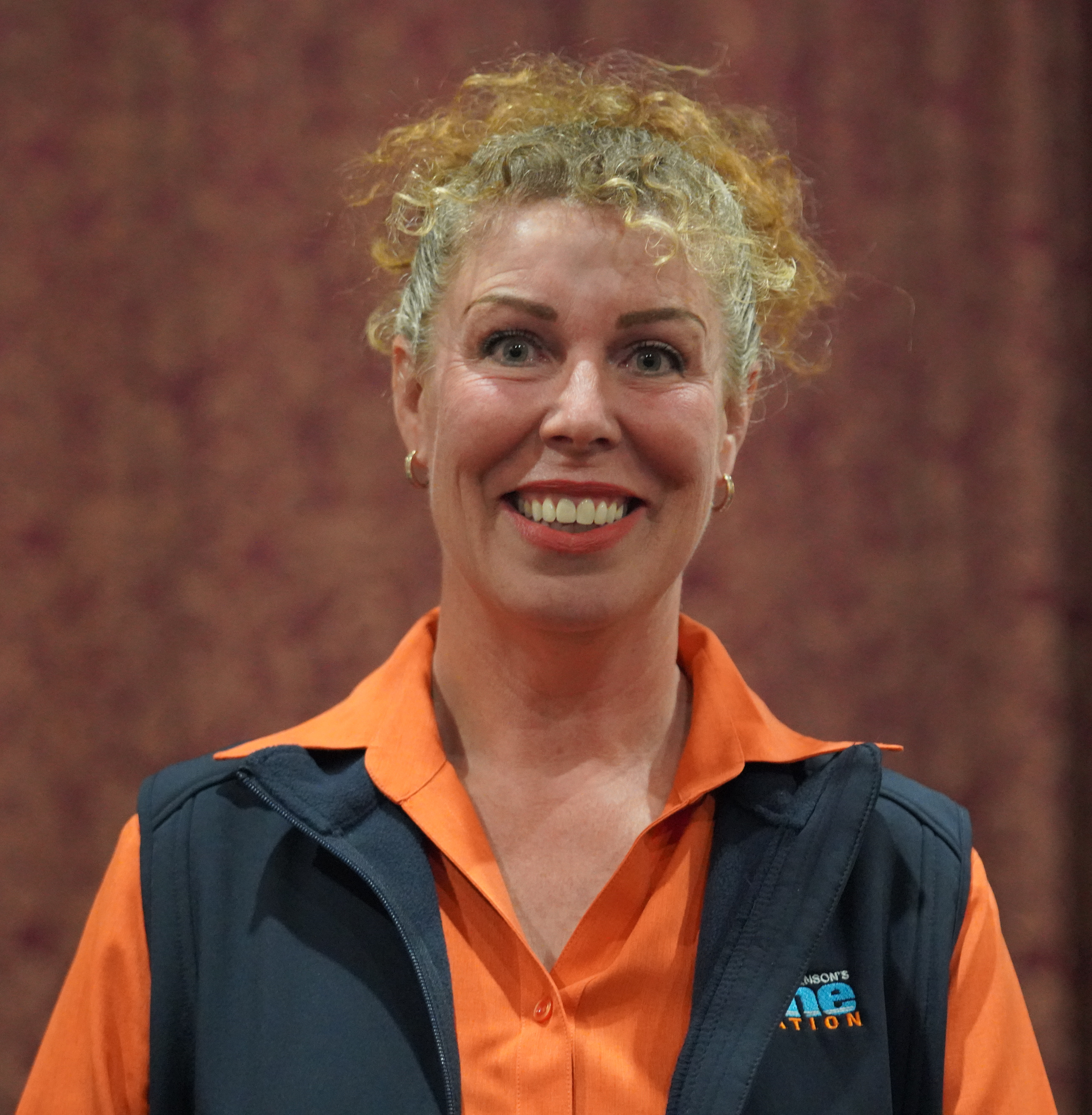
- Hewett in 2026

Member of the South Australian Legislative Council
- Incumbent
- Assumed office 21 March 2026

Member of the District Council of Mount Barker for South Ward
- In office 10 November 2022 – 3 November 2025

Member of the Barunga West Council
- In office 9 November 2018 – 10 November 2022

Personal details
- Party: One Nation
- Other political affiliations: Conservatives (2018)

Rebecca Hewett is an Australian politician, and has sat as a member of the South Australian Legislative Council since the 2026 state election. Hewett is a member of Pauline Hanson's One Nation, and prior to her election to the Legislative Council had been a local councillor in Barunga West and Mount Barker.

== Career ==
Hewett first stood for office at the 2018 state election, representing the Australian Conservatives in the district of Narungga. Liberal candidate Fraser Ellis won the election, with Hewett polling 9.1% of the primary vote. Hewett was elected to the Barunga West Council later that year at the local elections.

At the 2022 local elections, Hewett ran for a seat on Mount Barker District Council, and was elected as a councillor representing the South Ward. As a councillor in 2025, Hewett claimed she had been pressured by Mount Barker mayor David Leach to remove a Facebook post in which she polled whether followers approved of the council funding a Survival Day event on 26 January. Hewett stated she had voted to fund the event, but was unaware it would be held on 26 January, the date of the Australia Day public holiday. Hewett resigned from council in November 2025.

Hewett stood in the 2025 federal election as a candidate for Pauline Hanson's One Nation in the division of Mayo, which was held by Centre Alliance MP Rebekha Sharkie. Sharkie was re-elected, with Hewett placing fifth and receiving a primary vote of 6.0%. At the 2026 state election, Hewett stood again for One Nation in the Legislative Council, ranked as the third candidate on their ticket. Hewett was successful in her election bid, and will serve an eight-year term.
