= Premier's Climate Change Council =

South Australian state government body

Agency overview
- Formed: February 2008
- Jurisdiction: Government of South Australia
- Headquarters: 81-95 Waymouth Street, Adelaide, South Australia
- Minister responsible: Lucy Hood, Minister for Climate, Environment and Water
- Agency executive: Martin Haese, Chair
- Parent agency: Department for Environment and Water
- Website: Premier's Climate Change Council

The Premier's Climate Change Council is a South Australian state government body within the Department for Environment and Water. It was established in 2008 and as of 2025 is chaired by Martin Haese. The Council provides independent advice to the Minister responsible for climate change about matters related to the reduction of greenhouse gas emissions and climate change adaptation.

== History ==
The Premier's Climate Change Council was established by the Government of South Australia under the Climate Change and Greenhouse Emissions Reduction Act 2007.

The inaugural council was created in February 2008, under the Rann government. The Council's membership represents the business community, the environment and conservation sector, the scientific community and state and local governments.

In 2013, Michelle Lensink MLC questioned the efficacy of the Premier's Climate Change Council, and asked the Minister for the environment, Ian Hunter about the absence of the Council's 2011-12 annual report from the Council's website. In 2013, the Council published South Australia’s Climate Change Vision: Pathways to 2050 to advise Premier Jay Weatherill and his government on future planning and policy directions for the state.

In 2018, prominent South Australian businessman Martin Haese was appointed as chair, beginning the role in 2019.

In 2019 the Council supported the development of the Blue Carbon Strategy for South Australia, to help mitigate climate change by protecting the state's blue carbon sinks, including seagrass meadows, saltmarshes, and mangroves.

The Council also supports the implementation of the recommendations of the 2024 Statewide Climate Change Risk and Opportunity Assessment, which was released in January 2026.

== Role ==
The role of the council is to "provide independent advice to the Minister about matters associated with reducing greenhouse gas emissions and adapting to climate change. The Council also takes a leadership role in consulting with and disseminating information to sectors of the community about issues associated with climate change". The primary role of the Council as stated on the government website is to provide independent advice to the Minister for Environment and Water on reducing greenhouse gas emissions and adapting to climate change.

== Membership ==
=== Selection criteria ===
The Act requires the appointment of seven to ten persons by the Minister from state and local government, the business community, the environment and conservation sector, the scientific community, and from other sectors of the South Australian community. The appointment process must take account of: an individual person’s knowledge of and expertise in the subject matter; consultation with the Local Government Association of South Australia and the Conservation Council of South Australia; and must ensure the minimal representation of both genders.

=== Membership as of 2025 ===
As of 2025 the membership of the Premier's Climate Change Council comprises:

- Martin Haese (Chair)
- Daniel Bennett
- Tiahni Adamson
- Angela Evans
- Susan Jeanes
- Penny Schulz
- Daniel Spencer
- Jodie van Deventer
- Craig Wilkins
- Susan Smith

=== Former members ===
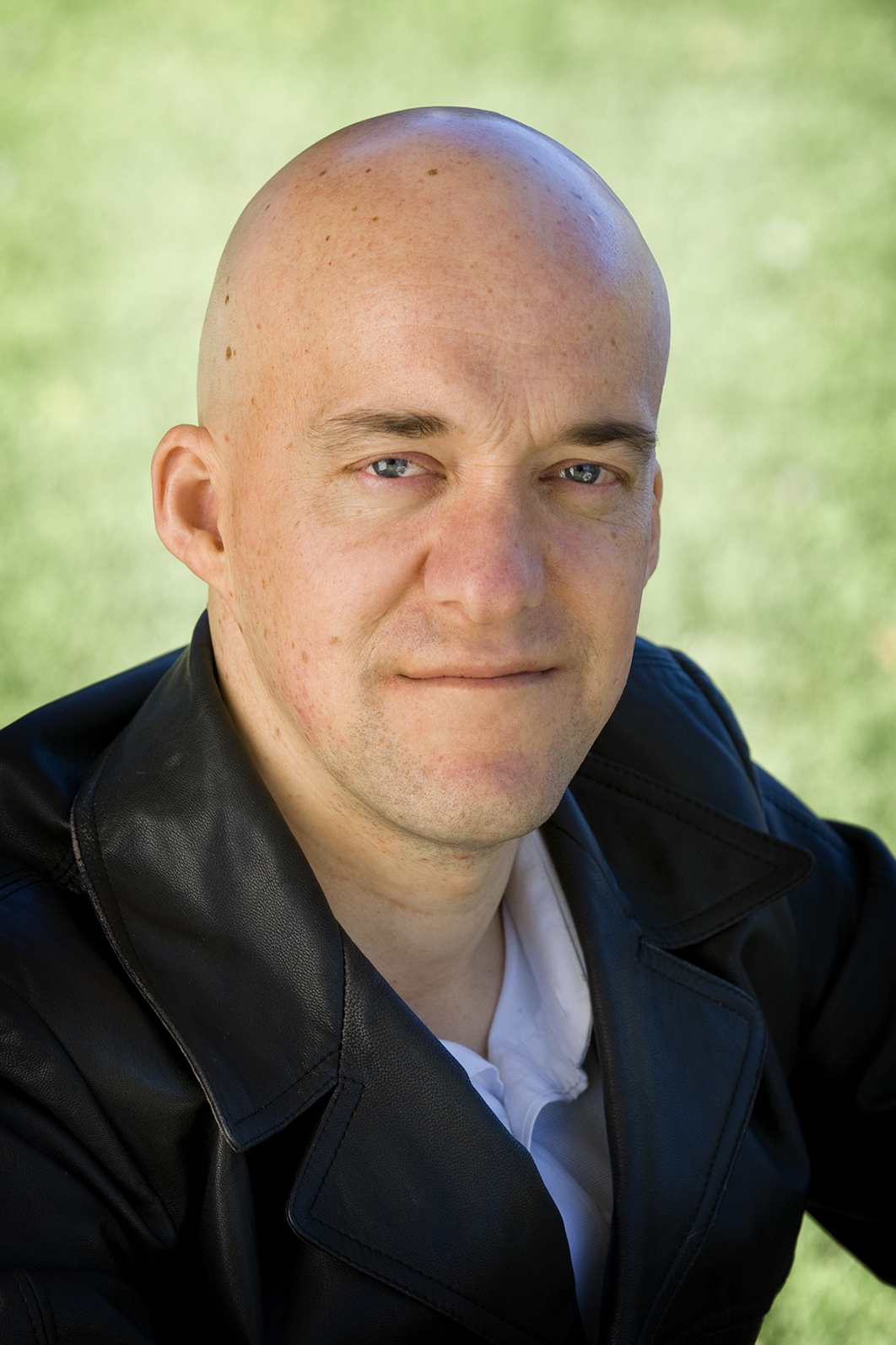
- Barry Brook (former member)
  Professor Barry Brook
- Kathryn Bellette
- Professor Don Bursill
- Bruce Carter
- Rob Chapman
- Daniel Conley
- Dianne "Di" Davidson
- Ros DeGaris
- Michelle Edge
- Mayor Ann Ferguson
- Brian Foster
- Dr Campbell Gemmell
- Nicole Halsey
- Fred Hansen
- Dr Paul Heithersay
- Allan Holmes
- Tim Kelly
- John Kerr
- David Klingberg (Chair)
- Dr Prue McMichael
- Caroline McMillen
- Suzanne Miller
- John O'Brien
- Professor Mary O’Kane
- Tim O’Loughlin
- Professor Jean Palutikof
- Jenny Paradiso
- Pauline Peel
- Julie Pettett
- Sandy Pitcher
- Don Russell
- Verity Sanders
- Joseph Scales
- Professor Andrew Stock
- Vienna Tran
- Michelle Tucker
- Jim White
- Cecilia Woolford
