= 2022 Adelaide City Council election =

Election of lord mayor and 11 councillors to the City of Adelaide

- 12 November 2022
- Lord Mayor
- Turnout: 28.38% (▲0.90 pp)
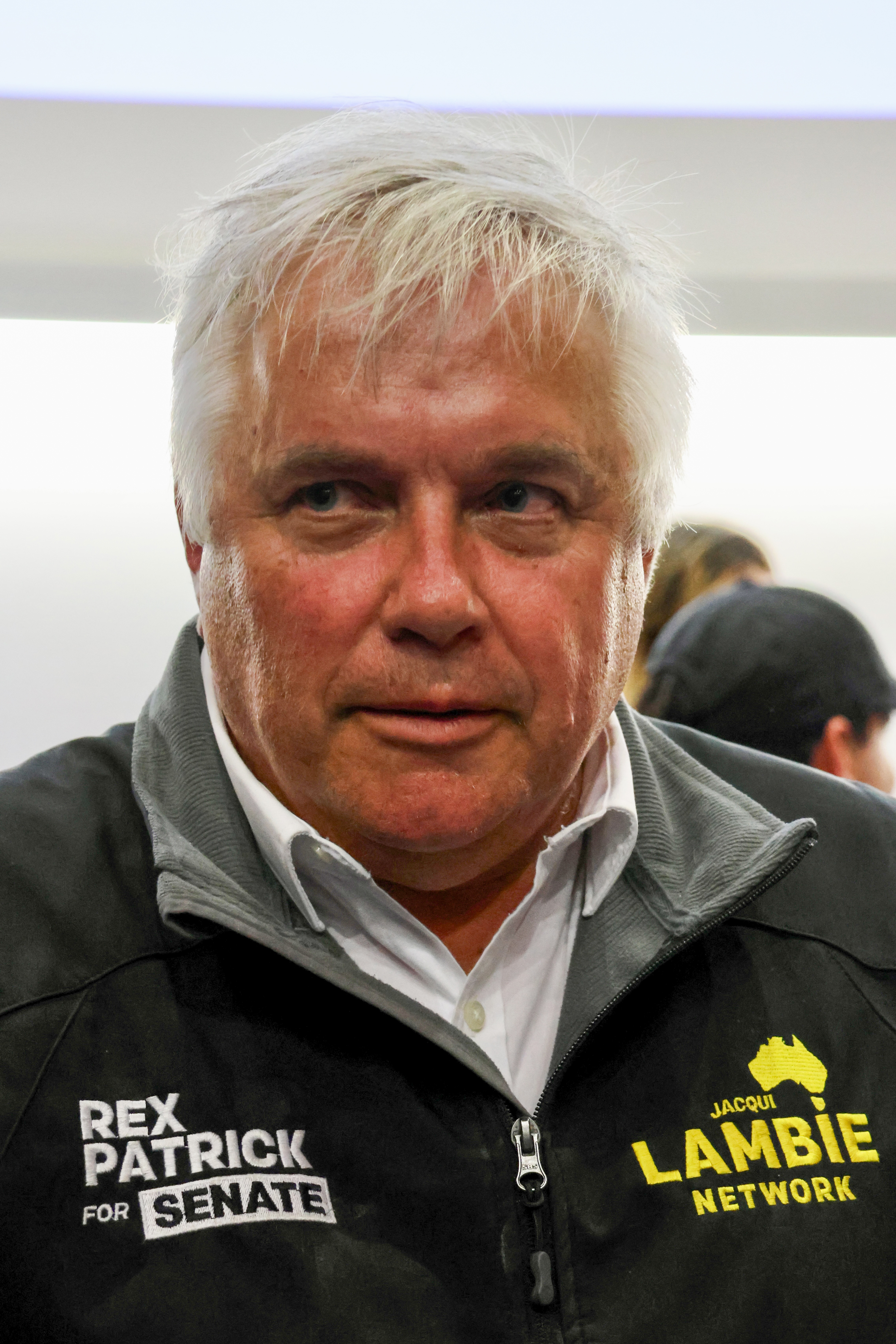

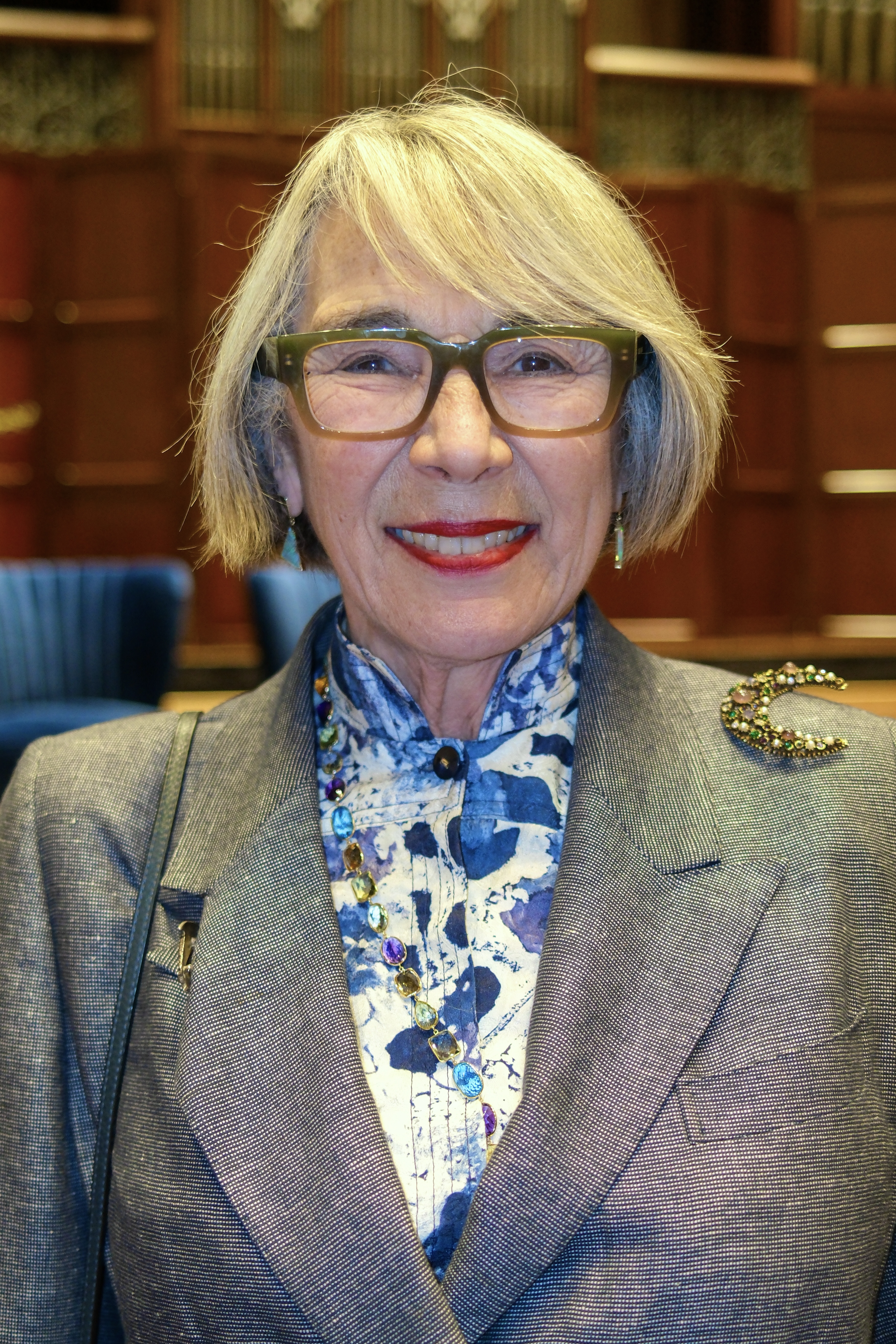

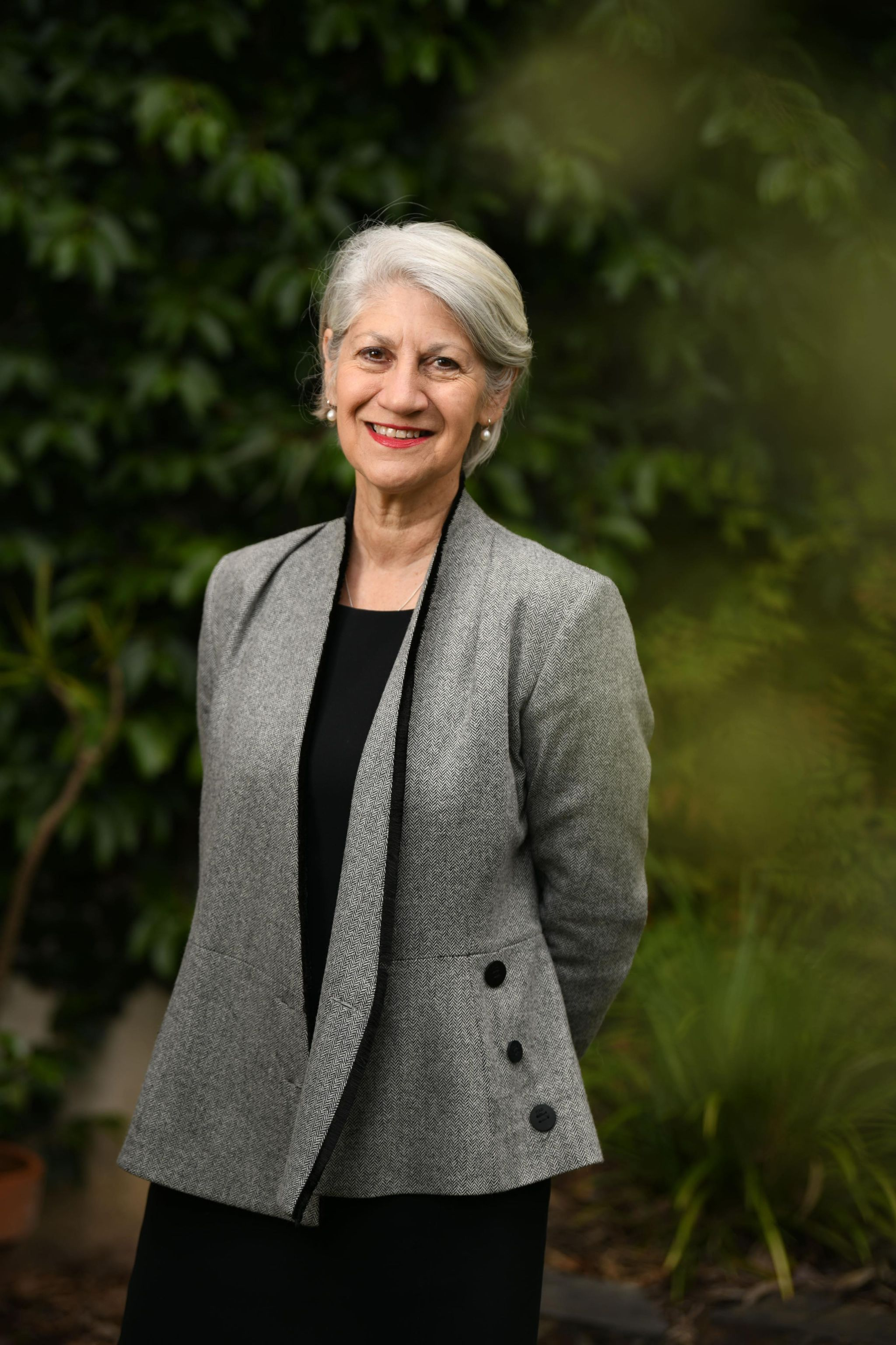
	First party	Second party	Third party
Candidate	Rex Patrick	Jane Lomax-Smith	Sandy Verschoor
Party	Independent	Ind. Labor	TA
Primary vote	2,734	2,666	2,489
Percentage	31.88%	31.08%	29.02%
Swing	▲31.88	▲31.08	▼20.56
TCP	49.60%	50.40%
TCP swing	▲49.60	▲50.40
Lord Mayor before election
Sandy Verschoor
TA
Elected Lord Mayor
Jane Lomax-Smith
Ind. Labor
- Councillors
Party	Leader	Vote %	Seats	+/–
Independent	N/A	52.1	3	+1
TA	Sandy Verschoor	19.5	3	−4
Labor	Jane Lomax-Smith	7.3	3	+2
Liberal	None	11.9	1	0
Greens	None	6.2	1	+1
This lists parties that won seats. See the complete results below.
Results by ward

The 2022 Adelaide City Council election was held on 12 November 2022 to elect a lord mayor and eleven councillors to the City of Adelaide. The election was held as part of the statewide local government elections in South Australia.

Incumbent lord mayor Sandy Verschoor was defeated by former lord mayor Jane Lomax-Smith. The election proved to be controversial, with unsuccessful candidate and former senator Rex Patrick appealing the result after losing by 52 votes.

== Background ==
At the November 2018 election, six candidates from Team Adelaide were successful, giving the group control of the council. Successful lord mayoral candidate Sandy Verschoor was also linked to the group in media reports.

In January 2020, Team Adelaide founder and councillor Houssam Abiad resigned. The Central Ward supplementary election in April−May 2020 was won by independent Greg Mackie, leaving Team Adelaide without a majority. Mackie later resigned in June 2022, claiming there was "no civility" on the council.

Going into the election, the group was led by Alexander Hyde and composed of Mary Couros, Franz Knoll, Simon Hou and Arman Abrahimzadeh. Jessy Khera was also affiliated with the group, however she did not seek re-election in order to look after a terminally ill relative.

== Results ==
=== Lord Mayor ===
2022 South Australian mayoral elections: Adelaide
Party	Candidate	Votes	%	±%
Independent	Rex Patrick	2,734	31.88	+31.88
Independent Labor	Jane Lomax-Smith	2,666	31.08	+31.08
Team Adelaide	Sandy Verschoor	2,489	29.02	−20.56
Independent	Vivek Gupta	391	4.56	+4.56
Independent	Steven Kelly	297	3.46	−3.74
Total formal votes		8,577	99.39	−0.06
Informal votes		53	0.61	+0.06
Turnout		8,630	28.38	+0.90
Two-candidate-preferred result
Independent Labor	Jane Lomax-Smith	3,251	50.40	+50.40
Independent	Rex Patrick	3,199	49.60	+49.60
Independent Labor gain from Team Adelaide				

=== Area Councillors ===
2022 South Australian local elections: Area Councillors
Party	Candidate	Votes	%	±%
Team Adelaide	Arman Abrahimzadeh (elected)	1,851	22.0	
Independent	Anne Moran	1,790	21.3	
Independent	Janet Giles (elected)	1,686	20.1	
Independent Liberal	Domenico Gelonese	649	7.7	
Independent Liberal	Glenn Bain	639	7.6	
Independent	Frank Barbaro	612	7.3	
Independent	Juliette Lockwood	571	6.8	
Independent	Du Zhigang	383	4.6	
Independent	Josephine Patterson	217	2.6	
Total formal votes		8,398	97.8	+1.7
Informal votes		190	2.2	−1.7
Turnout		8,588	28.2	+0.9

=== North Ward ===
2022 South Australian local elections: North Ward
Party	Candidate	Votes	%	±%
Independent	Phil Martin (elected)	878	36.0	
Team Adelaide	Mary Couros (elected)	659	27.1	
Independent	Sandy Wilkinson	410	16.8	
Independent	Valdis Dunis	289	11.9	
Independent	Robert Farnan	200	8.2	
Total formal votes		2,436	98.0	
Informal votes		50	2.0	
Turnout		2,486	34.7	

=== Central Ward ===
2022 South Australian local elections: Central Ward
Party	Candidate	Votes	%	±%
Independent Labor	Jing Li (elected)	508	15.4	
Independent	Carmel Noon (elected)	466	14.2	
Team Adelaide	Simon Hou (elected)	355	10.8	
Team Adelaide	Alexander Hyde	338	10.3	
Independent Labor	David Elliot (elected)	337	10.2	
Independent	Mark Hamilton	315	9.6	
Independent Liberal	Gagan Sharma	238	7.2	
Team Adelaide	Franz Knoll	176	5.3	
Independent	Ben Ayris	135	4.1	
Independent	Fiona Hui	119	3.6	
Independent	Alex Radda	97	2.9	
Independent	Cassandra Papalia	75	2.3	
Independent	Hugo Siu	68	2.1	
Independent	Tammy Vo	65	2.0	
Total formal votes		3,292	97.3	
Informal votes		90	2.7	
Turnout		3,382	24.3	

=== South Ward ===
2022 South Australian local elections: South Ward
Party	Candidate	Votes	%	±%
Independent Greens	Keiran Snape (elected)	758	27.4	
Independent	Colette Slight	277	10.0	
Independent Labor	Mark Siebentritt (elected)	275	9.9	
Independent Liberal	Henry Davis (elected)	263	9.5	
Independent	Theo Vlassis	241	8.7	
Independent Greens	Sean Cullen-Macaskill	199	7.2	
Independent	Ida Jonassen Llewellyn-Smith	165	5.7	
Independent Labor	Kimberlee Brown	146	5.3	
Independent Liberal	Helika Cruz	139	5.0	
Independent Liberal	Tim Scott	138	5.0	
Independent Greens	Sue McKay	115	4.2	
Independent	Param Ramanan	51	1.8	
Total formal votes		2,767	97.3	
Informal votes		76	2.7	
Turnout		2,843	30.5	

== Aftermath ==
Shortly after the election, Electoral Commissioner Mick Sherry announced he was investigating suspected "voting irregularities" in Central Ward, after up to 20 central ward ballots were rejected from the count, including lord mayoral votes.

On 15 December 2022, unsuccessful lord mayoral candidate Rex Patrick appealed the results with a petition in the Court of Disputed Returns and requested the lord mayoral and Central Ward elections be declared invalid.

In December 2023, it was revealed that vote-tallying software malfunctioned, with successful candidate Jing Li's 31-vote margin over defeated councillor Alexander Hyde in Central Ward revised to 24 votes. Hyde has requested the election be declared void and recontested, however as of January 2024, this has not occurred.
