= Team Adelaide =

- Leader: Alexander Hyde
- Founder: Houssam Abiad
- Founded: Early 2018
- Dissolved: Late 2022
- Adelaide City Council: 7 / 12 (2018−2019)

Team Adelaide was an Australian political grouping. It controlled the City of Adelaide, a local government area in South Australia, between 2018 and 2022.

Although described as conservative-leaning, InDaily reported the group also campaigned for progressive action on homelessness and climate change.

== History ==
In early 2018, a group of candidates for Adelaide City Council met with and were endorsed by then-Lord Mayor Martin Haese for the upcoming election. The group's founder, Houssam Abiad, later registered "Team Adelaide" as a domain name.

At the November 2018 election, six Team Adelaide candidates were successful, giving the group control of the council. Successful lord mayoral candidate Sandy Verschoor was also linked to the group in media reports.

The group's control of the council led to public friction between councillors. In one incident in May 2019, independent councillor Anne Moran was allegedly involved in an "altercation" involving physical intimidation and verbal abuse with Team Adelaide councillor Mary Couros.

In January 2020, Abiad resigned from council. The Central Ward supplementary election in April−May 2020 was won by independent Greg Mackie, leaving Team Adelaide without a majority. Mackie later resigned in June 2022, claiming there was "no civility" on the council.

Going into the 2022 election, the group was led by Alexander Hyde and composed of Mary Couros, Franz Knoll, Simon Hou and Arman Abrahimzadeh. Jessy Khera was also affiliated with the group, however she did not seek re-election in order to look after a terminally ill relative.

Abrahimzadeh, Couros and Hou were re-elected in November 2022, while Hyde and Knoll were defeated. Sandy Verschoor was also defeated in the lord mayoral election.
