= 2022 South Australian local elections =

- 12 November 2022
- Registered: 1,243,661
- Turnout: ▲1.60%

The 2022 South Australian local elections were held on 12 November 2022 to elect the councils of 66 of the 68 local government areas (LGAs) in South Australia. Many councils also held mayoral elections.

The elections were conducted by the Electoral Commission of South Australia. Starting at these elections, roadside election corflutes were banned.

The number of people on the electoral roll increased from 1,208,858 at the 2018 elections to 1,243,661 in 2022.

As per usual, no election was scheduled in Roxby Council as it is served by an administrator who performs all the functions of a council. The election in Coober Pedy was not held as the council had been suspended in January 2019.

== Party changes before elections ==
A number of councillors joined or left parties before the 2022 elections.

Council	Ward	Councillor	Former party	New party	Date
Marion	Mayor	Kris Hanna	SA Best	Independent	Post-November 2018
West Torrens	Airport	Jassmine Wood	SA Best	Independent	Post-November 2018
Port Lincoln	Unsubdivided	Andrea Broadfoot	Centre Alliance	Independent	Post-May 2019
Barunga West	Unsubdivided	Rebecca Hewett	Conservatives	Independent	25 June 2019
Onkaparinga	Knox	Heidi Greaves	Conservatives	Independent	25 June 2019
Adelaide	South	Henry Davis	Liberal	Independent	19 March 2022
Port Pirie	Unsubdivided	Ali Gulin	Liberal	Independent	29 June 2022
Berri Barmera	Area Councillors	Meta Sindos	Liberal	Independent	30 June 2022
Holdfast Bay	Somerton	William Miller	Liberal	Independent	30 June 2022
Streaky Bay	Flinders	Travis Barber	Liberal	Independent	July 2022
Mount Gambier	Unsubdivided	Sonya Mezinec	Labor	Independent	30 July 2022

== Elections timeline ==
- 29 July – Close of electoral roll
- 23 August – Nominations open
- 6 September – Nominations close
- 14–20 October – Mailout of ballot papers to voters
- 10 November – Close of voting
- 12 November – Vote counting begins

== Results ==
South Australian Councils (STV)
Party	Primary votes			Seats	
Party	Votes	%	Swing (pp)	Seats	Change
Independent				478	
Independent Liberal				57	
Independent Labor				48	
Independent Greens				10	
Independent National				4	
Team Adelaide				3	
Independent One Nation				1	
Ind. Animal Justice				1	
Vacant				14	
Total		100.0	–	616	
Informal votes					
Turnout					
Enrolled voters	1,288,329	–	–		
Source: Electoral Commission of South Australia

== Aftermath ==
After only 34.54% of eligible voters turned out for the elections, compared with 32.94% in 2018, SA Best MP Frank Pangallo called for compulsory voting and a requirement that all voters must be Australian citizens. There were also calls to reform the timing of local elections so that they don't occur in the same year as the state election.

As a result of 16 vacancies not filled at the elections, eight separate councils were forced to hold supplementary elections in 2023.

On 15 December 2022, unsuccessful lord mayoral candidate Rex Patrick appealed the results with a petition in the Court of Disputed Returns and requested the lord mayoral and Central Ward elections in Adelaide be declared invalid.

One Nation had their first local election victory in SA, with Carlos Quaremba elected as a councillor in Victor Harbor.

The ECSA launched an investigation after Salisbury candidate and councillor Severina Burner offered voters to "fill in your ballots and hand them in". She was later removed as a councillor in June 2023 for separate comments.

== By-elections and countbacks ==
=== By-elections ===
The ECSA held supplementary elections in March 2023 in 10 different LGAs to fill council seats that were left vacant following the 2022 elections.

Council	Ward	Before		Change		Result after preference distribution			
Council	Ward	Councillor	Party	Cause	Date	Date	Party	Candidate	%
Copper Coast	Unsubdivided	N/A	N/A	Not enough nominations at 2022 election	12 November 2022	March 2023	Independent	Matthew Stock	60.06
Copper Coast	Unsubdivided	N/A	N/A	Not enough nominations at 2022 election	12 November 2022	March 2023	Independent	Dominica Thomson	39.94
Kimba	Unsubdivided	N/A	N/A	Not enough nominations at 2022 election	12 November 2022	March 2023	Independent	Francene Francis	89.96
Kimba	Unsubdivided	N/A	N/A	Not enough nominations at 2022 election	12 November 2022	March 2023	Independent	Dianne McDonald	10.64
Kingston	Mayor	N/A	N/A	No nominations at 2022 election	12 November 2022	March 2023	Independent	Jeff Pope	N/A
Kingston	Mayor	N/A	N/A	No nominations at 2022 election	12 November 2022	March 2023	Elected unopposed		
Mount Remarkable	Willochra	N/A	N/A	Not enough nominations at 2022 election	12 November 2022	March 2023	Ind. Liberal	Dan van Holst Pellekaan	75.07
Mount Remarkable	Willochra	N/A	N/A	Not enough nominations at 2022 election	12 November 2022	March 2023	Independent	Trevor Bornholm (Note: Second-placed on primary vote as the by-election did not require preference distribution.)	10.63
Northern Areas	Broughton	N/A	N/A	Not enough nominations at 2022 election	12 November 2022	March 2023	Independent	Keith Pluckrose	59.55
Northern Areas	Broughton	N/A	N/A	Not enough nominations at 2022 election	12 November 2022	March 2023	Independent	Brendan Fitzgerald	40.45
Robe	Mayor	N/A	N/A	No nominations at 2022 election	12 November 2022	March 2023	Ind. Liberal	Lisa Ruffell	N/A
Robe	Mayor	N/A	N/A	No nominations at 2022 election	12 November 2022	March 2023	Elected unopposed		
Southern Mallee	Unsubdivided	N/A	N/A	Not enough nominations at 2022 election	12 November 2022	March 2023	Independent	Christopher Mead (Note: Five vacancies on council, meaning five candidates were elected - this shows their primary vote before preference distribution.)	36.67
Southern Mallee	Unsubdivided	N/A	N/A	Not enough nominations at 2022 election	12 November 2022	March 2023	Independent	Campbell Michell	17.65
Southern Mallee	Unsubdivided	N/A	N/A	Not enough nominations at 2022 election	12 November 2022	March 2023	Independent	David Smith	11.64
Southern Mallee	Unsubdivided	N/A	N/A	Not enough nominations at 2022 election	12 November 2022	March 2023	Independent	Trevor Pocock	6.38
Southern Mallee	Unsubdivided	N/A	N/A	Not enough nominations at 2022 election	12 November 2022	March 2023	Independent	Luke Kennedy	4.13
Streaky Bay	Eyre	N/A	N/A	Not enough nominations at 2022 election	12 November 2022	March 2023	Independent	Guy La China	N/A
Streaky Bay	Eyre	N/A	N/A	Not enough nominations at 2022 election	12 November 2022	March 2023	Elected unopposed		
Tumby Bay	Unsubdivided	N/A	N/A	Not enough nominations at 2022 election	12 November 2022	March 2023	Independent	Julie Ann Elliott (Note: Four vacancies on council, meaning five candidates were elected - this shows their primary vote before preference distribution.)	35.86
Tumby Bay	Unsubdivided	N/A	N/A	Not enough nominations at 2022 election	12 November 2022	March 2023	Independent	Trevor Smith	18.10
Tumby Bay	Unsubdivided	N/A	N/A	Not enough nominations at 2022 election	12 November 2022	March 2023	Independent	Fiona Ward	12.07
Tumby Bay	Unsubdivided	N/A	N/A	Not enough nominations at 2022 election	12 November 2022	March 2023	Independent	Ross Hudson	7.84
Kimba	Unsubdivided	N/A	N/A	Not enough nominations at 2022 election	12 November 2022	March 2023	Independent	Dennis Petty	64.79
Kimba	Unsubdivided	N/A	N/A	Not enough nominations at 2022 election	12 November 2022	March 2023	Independent	Craig Walladge	35.21
Flinders Ranges	Unsubdivided	Clinton Ryks-Jones	Independent	Resignation	6 June 2023	24 July 2023	Independent	Greg Flint	51.83
Flinders Ranges	Unsubdivided	Clinton Ryks-Jones	Independent	Resignation	6 June 2023	24 July 2023	Independent	Dave Wallis	48.17

=== Countbacks ===
Council	Ward	Before		Change		After		
Council	Ward	Councillor	Party	Cause	Date	Date	Councillor	Party
Tea Tree Gully	Drumminor	Damian Wyld	Independent Liberal	Resignation due to illness	16 November 2023	28 November 2023	Lyn Petrie	Independent Liberal
Berri Barmera	Area Councillor	Rhonda Centofanti	Independent	Died	3 December 2023	TBA	TBA	TBA

== See also ==
- 2022 Adelaide City Council election
