= Sandy Verschoor =

Australian businesswoman who was Lord Mayor of Adelaide

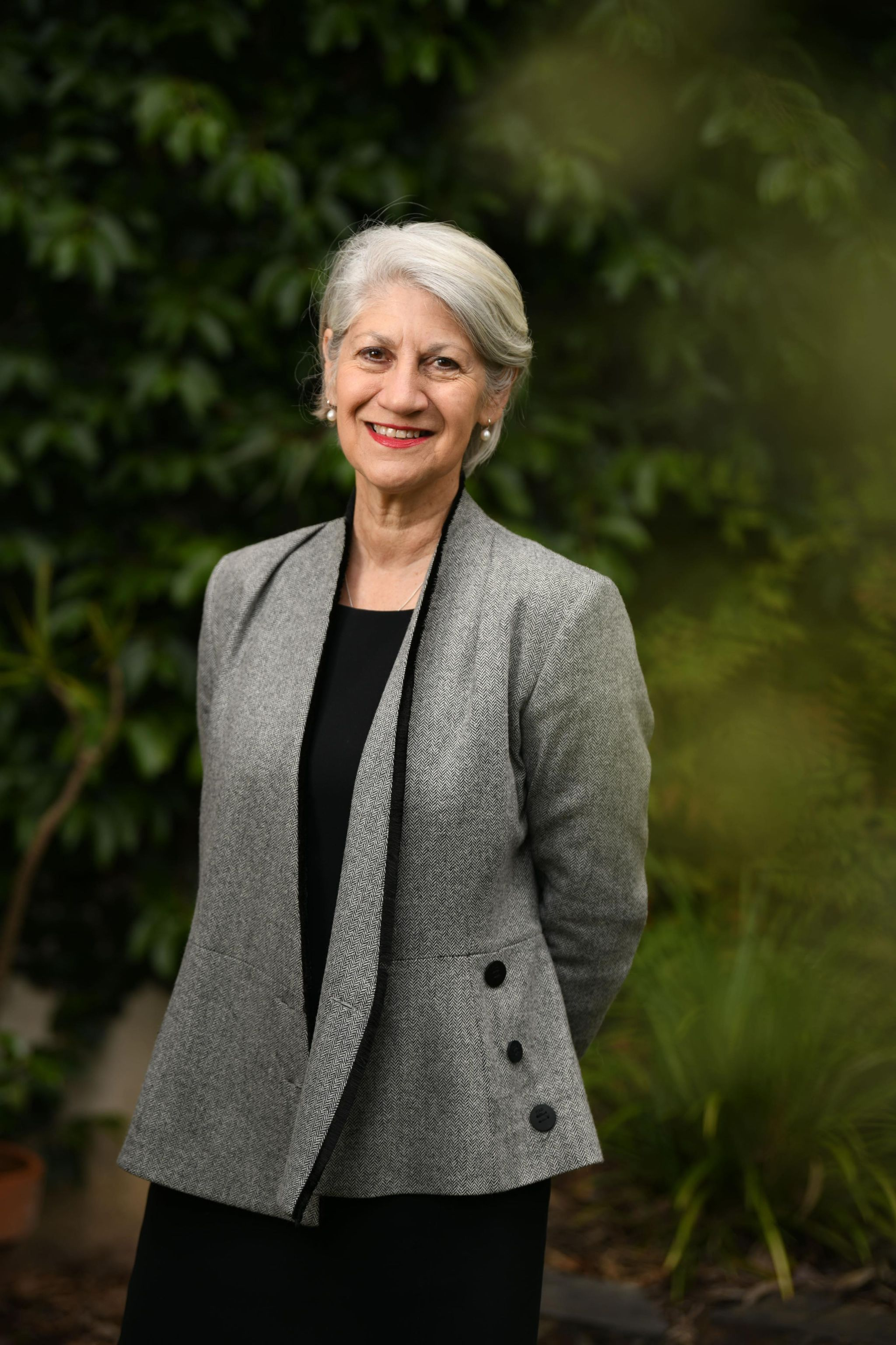
- Verschoor in Adelaide in 2023

Lord Mayor of Adelaide
- In office 12 November 2018 – 14 November 2022
- Deputy: See list: Houssam Abiad Alex Hyde Mary Couros Arman Abrahimzadeh
- Preceded by: Martin Haese
- Succeeded by: Jane Lomax-Smith

Deputy Lord Mayor of Adelaide
- In office June 2017 – 12 November 2018

Alderwoman of the Adelaide City Council
- Incumbent
- Assumed office 15 December 2015

Personal details
- Born: Sandra Maaike Jayne Verschoor
- Spouse: Gregg Mitchell
- Children: 3

Sandra Maaike Jayne Verschoor is an Australian businesswoman who was the Lord Mayor of Adelaide in South Australia from 12 November 2018 until November 2022. Prior to this, she was Deputy Lord Mayor and a general manager at the City of Adelaide. She is now the chair of both the Art Gallery of South Australia and the South Australian Heritage Council.

== Early life and education ==
Verschoor is the second daughter of Dutch immigrants to Australia and grew up in Elizabeth. She is of Dutch, French, Portuguese, and Ceylonese descent.

She has a Master of Arts, an MBA and a PhD in Business Administration from Kennedy Western University.

== Career ==
Verschoor worked in broadcasting and marketing in the early 1990s, and became marketing manager of the Adelaide Festival of the Arts in 1995 and Marketing & Development Director 1996-1999. As the Associate Director of Arts Projects Australia 2001 - 2006 she worked on WOMADelaide and helped establish the Adelaide Film Festival. She was CEO of the Adelaide Fringe from 2006 to 2010. In 2011, she became the executive producer of the Festival of Ideas.

In 2012, Verschoor worked as general manager for the Adelaide City Council for three years before being elected to council at a by-election in 2015.

She took up the role of executive producer of the Windmill Theatre in 2015 and CEO of the Adelaide Festival in 2016.

From June 2017 to November 2018, she served as Deputy Lord Mayor for 18 months.

After Martin Haese decided not to run in the 2018 election, he endorsed Verschoor. Verschoor was elected Lord Mayor in November 2018, defeating lawyer Mark Hamilton and bookshop owner Kate Treloar. She served for four years, before being defeated in the 2022 election by former politician and lord mayor Jane Lomax-Smith.

== Recognition and awards ==
In 2022, Verschoor was nominated as OCPSE Leader of the Year in the Woman of the Year Awards (SkyCity Adelaide, The Advertiser, and Sunday Mail)

== Personal life ==
Verschoor is married and has two daughters and a son.

Political offices
Preceded by Martin Haese	Lord Mayor of Adelaide; 2018 – 2022	Succeeded by Jane Lomax-Smith
