= Cheong Liew =

Malaysian-born Australian chef (born 1949)

Cheong Liew OAM
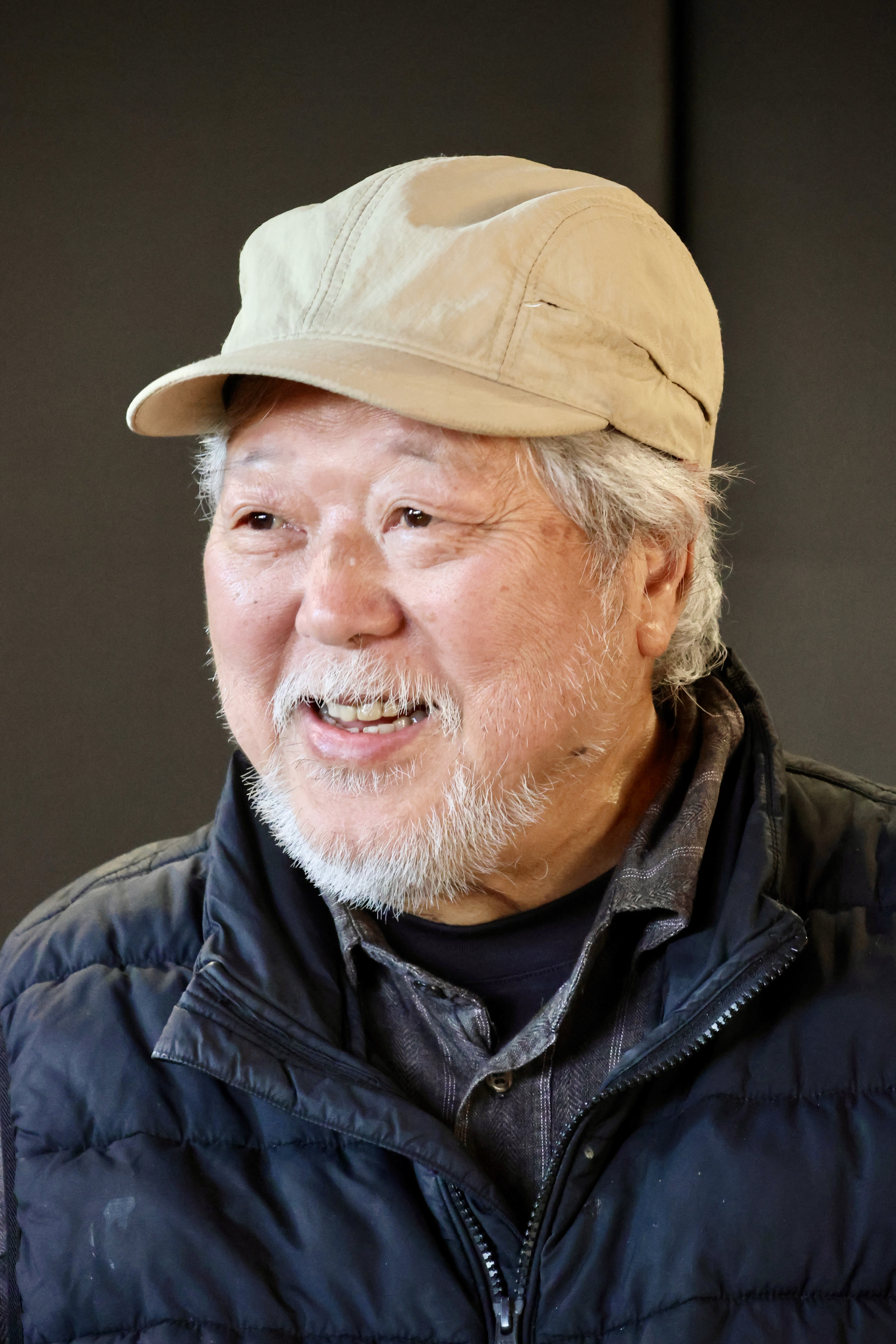
- Liew in 2025
- Born: 1949 (age 75–76); Kuala Lumpur, Federation of Malaya (present day Malaysia)
- Occupation: Chef

Cheong Liew OAM (born 1949) is a Malaysian-born Australian chef. He moved from Malaysia to Australia in 1969 to study electrical engineering, but instead became a chef. Famous for experimentation with new ingredients and formats, Liew has also been important in the development of Asian-Australian fusion cuisine.

== Early life ==
Cheong Liew was born in 1949 in Kuala Lumpur, Malaysia. His father was a farmer who also owned several restaurants. Following the 13 May incident, Liew's family emigrated to Adelaide, South Australia. In Adelaide, Liew's passion for cooking was ignited while he tended the grill part-time at the Greek restaurant Iliad in Whitmore Square. Although he had planned to study electrical engineering in Melbourne, he eventually decided to become a self-taught chef.

== Career ==
In 1975, Liew opened his own restaurant Neddy's, whose menu consisted of mostly Malaysian and Chinese dishes. His cooking incorporated ingredients not commonly used during his time, such as crocodile tail, pork leg, sea urchin and shark lip. The restaurant closed in 1988 and Liew went on to teach cookery at Regency Park, Adelaide.

In 1995, Liew took the reins at The Grange restaurant at the Hilton Hotel in Adelaide. At The Grange, Liew came up his "signature dish", titled "Four Dancers of the Sea", featuring "four varieties of seafood cooked in four distinct national styles". In 2009, after some 14 years, Cheong left The Grange; the restaurant closed at the end of the year.

== Awards and honours ==
Described as "one of the indisputable fathers of Australian cooking" by Stephen Downes in To Die For (2006), Liew was awarded the Medal of the Order of Australia in the 1999 Queen's Birthday Honours "for service to the food and restaurant industry through involvement in developing and influencing the style of contemporary Australian cuisine. In 2017, Liew was honoured as "one of the ten hottest chefs alive" by the American publication Food & Wine Magazine, and inducted into the Hall of Fame in the World Food Media Awards.

== Writing ==
- Liew, C., & Ho, E. F. (1995). My Food. St Leonards, N.S.W., Allen & Unwin. ISBN 1-86373-739-1
- Sly, David; Liew, Cheong; Lewis, Tony (2023). Cheong Liew: Inside My Food: Unlocking the Secrets of 100 Extraordinary Dishes. Mile End, SA: Wakefield Press. ISBN 9781923042063.

== See also ==
- South Australian food and drink
