= Allan Holmes (footballer) =

Australian rules footballer

Personal information
- Full name: Allan Holmes
- Born: 19 July 1952 (age 74)
- Original team: Hawksdale
- Height: 178 cm (5 ft 10 in)
- Weight: 82 kg (181 lb)
- Position: Defender

Playing career^{1}
| Years | Club | Games (Goals) |
| 1973–1976 | Collingwood | 28 (4) |
| 1977 | Fitzroy | 1 (0) |
| Total | | 29 (4) |
- ^{1} Playing statistics correct to the end of 1977.

Allan Holmes (born 19 July 1952) is a former Australian rules footballer who played for the Collingwood Football Club and Fitzroy Football Club in the Victorian Football League (VFL).
