= Allan Holmes (public servant) =

Allan Holmes (born 1954) is a former senior South Australian public servant. He holds several board positions in South Australia, including Presiding Member of the Coast Protection Board, Deputy Presiding Member of the board of the Environment Protection Authority (SA) and member of the board of the Environment Institute at the University of Adelaide.

== Career ==
Holmes completed a Bachelor of Science at the University of Melbourne in 1975 and a Masters of Environmental Studies at the University of Adelaide in 1977.

Holmes was appointed director of South Australia's National Parks in 1994 and went on to serve as Chief Executive of the Department of Environment and Heritage and later the Department of Environment, Water and Natural Resources until his retirement in 2014. Holmes is a former chair of the Zero Waste SA Board and was South Australia's representative on the Murray-Darling Basin Commission. Holmes was appointed Deputy Presiding Member of the board of the South Australian Environment Protection Authority on 11 March 2016. He was first appointed to the board in April 2003.

Holmes has been a spokesperson for South Australia's Department of the Environment on various issues, including the management of the state's water resources, management of marine and terrestrial protected areas, reductions in funding to the department, and the lack of attention paid to environmental issues by the South Australian media.
