= Arman Abrahimzadeh =

Anti-domestic violence campaigner

Arman Abrahimzadeh OAM

Deputy Lord Mayor of Adelaide
- In office 1 December 2021 – 29 November 2022
- Lord Mayor: Sandy Verschoor
- Preceded by: Mary Couros
- Succeeded by: Phillip Martin

Area Councillor for the Adelaide City Council
- Incumbent
- Assumed office 11 November 2018

Personal details
- Born: Iran
- Education: University of South Australia
- Occupation: Advocate; designer

Arman Abrahimzadeh is an Iranian-Afghan Australian anti-domestic violence campaigner based in Adelaide, South Australia, co-founder of Zahra Foundation Australia.

== Biography ==
Abrahimzadeh and his family migrated to Australia from Iran in 1997. His father was a lawyer and his mother was a housewife.

Along with his sisters, Atena and Anita, and their mother Zahra, he lived in an abusive home and in constant fear that their father, Ziaolleh, would harm or kill them.

In 2009, they were forced to flee their family home, becoming homeless before being referred to domestic violence shelters. After 12 months of threats and stalking, on 21 March 2010, Abrahimzadeh's father Zialloh finally carried out his threat and killed his mother Zahra, during Persian New Year celebrations at the Adelaide Convention Centre, in front of hundreds of witnesses.

On 11 November 2018, he was elected into the Adelaide City Council as an Area Councillor. He was chosen as the deputy Lord Mayor during the November council meeting to replace Mary Couros starting 1 December 2021. Philipp Martin succeeded Arman on 29 November 2022 in the role of Deputy Lord Mayor.

== Advocacy ==
Abrahimzadeh, along with his sisters, Atena and Anita, founded Zahra Foundation Australia in 2015 to support victims of domestic violence, including Indigenous family violence, and to create opportunities for economic empowerment.

Abrahimzadeh has been a key influential figure in shaping public policies and changes in legislation in relation to domestic violence in South Australia. He regularly speaks at forums discussing family violence and gender equality, and he is involved with a number of not-for-profit groups in this sector.

He has appeared on the current affairs series 7.30 on the ABC Television.

He is an ambassador for the White Ribbon Campaign in Australia and Our Watch.

== Recognition ==
He has been named 2015 Allan Sloane Young Citizen of The Year, 2016 Young Australian of the Year for South Australia, and the 2017 City of Charles Sturt Young Citizen of The Year.

He was awarded a Medal of the Order of Australia in June 2018.

== Other roles ==
He is a former Australian representative in taekwondo, and works in design and construction.

== Awards ==
Association	Awards	Year	Results
SISA	Allan Sloane Young Citizen of the Year	2015	Won
Government honours	Young Australian of the Year for South Australia	2016	Won
City of Charles Sturt	Young Citizen of the Year	2017	Won

== Legacy of Zahra's death ==
The Women's Domestic Violence Court Assistance Service (WDVCAS) was established in July 2015, as a response to the coronial inquest into the murder of Zahra. Funded for two years by the victims of crime levy, the services provide information, legal advice, support and representation relating to intervention order. The service is accessible via Victim Support Services in Adelaide, Port Lincoln, Mount Gambier, Whyalla, Port Augusta, Port Pirie and Berri. The service won the 2021 Law Society of South Australia Justice Award, and continues to operate.

Civic offices
Preceded by Mary Couros	Deputy Lord Mayor of Adelaide; 2021 – 2022	Succeeded by Phillip Martin
