= City of Adelaide =

Coordinates: 34°56′S 138°36′E

- Local government area
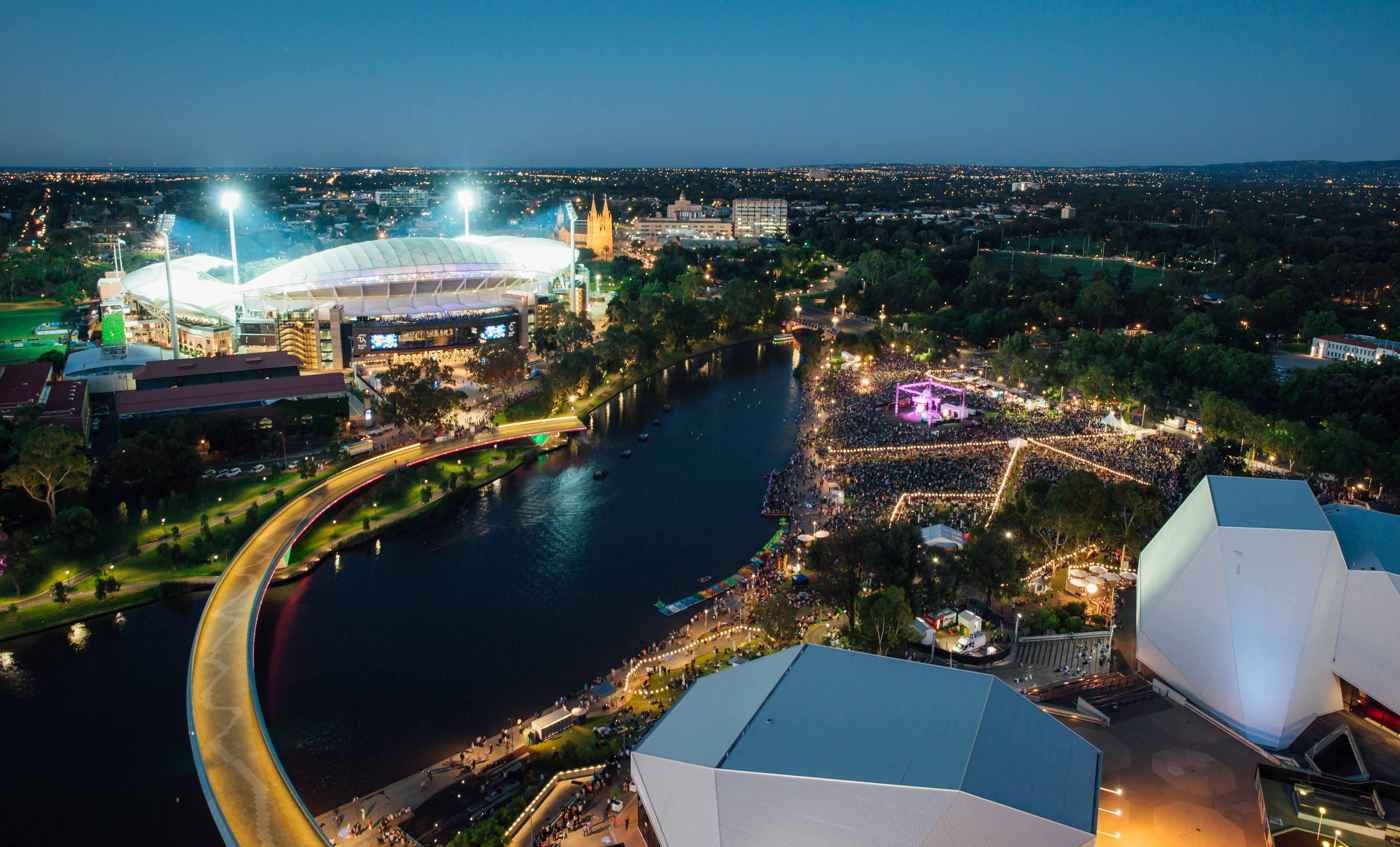

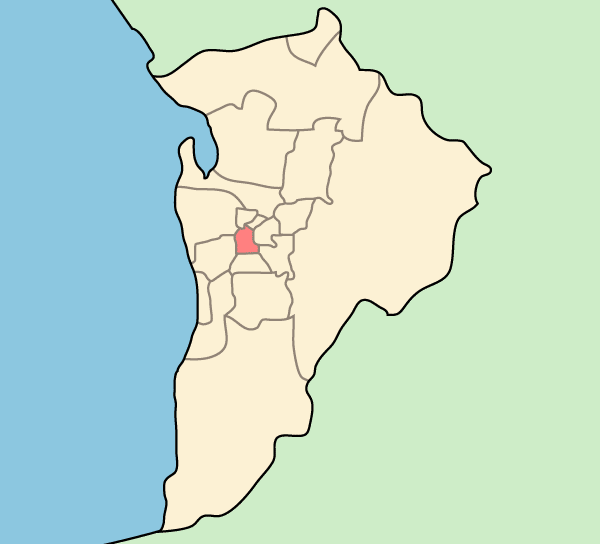
- Location of Adelaide within the Adelaide metropolitan area
- Interactive map of City of Adelaide
- Country: Australia
- State: South Australia
- Region: Metropolitan Adelaide
- Established: 1840
- Council seat: Adelaide city centre

Government
  - Lord Mayor: Jane Lomax-Smith
  - Council: Adelaide City Council
  - State electorate: Electoral district of Adelaide
  - Federal division: Division of Adelaide

Area
  - Total: 15.57 km^{2} (6.01 sq mi)

Population
  - Total: 25,026 (2021 census)
  - Density: 1,607.3/km^{2} (4,162.9/sq mi)
- Website: City of Adelaide
LGAs around City of Adelaide
Charles Sturt	Prospect	Walkerville
West Torrens	City of Adelaide	Norwood Payneham St Peters
West Torrens	Unley	Burnside

The City of Adelaide, also known as the Corporation of the City of Adelaide and Adelaide City Council, is a local government area in the metropolitan area of greater Adelaide, South Australia. It is legally defined as the capital city of South Australia by the City of Adelaide Act 1998. It includes the Adelaide city centre, the suburb of North Adelaide, and the Adelaide Park Lands, which surround North Adelaide and the city centre.

Established in 1840, the City of Adelaide Municipal Corporation was the first municipal authority in Australia. At its time of establishment, Adelaide's (and Australia's) first mayor, James Hurtle Fisher, was elected. From 1919 onwards, the municipality has had a Lord Mayor, as of 2023 being Jane Lomax-Smith.

== History ==
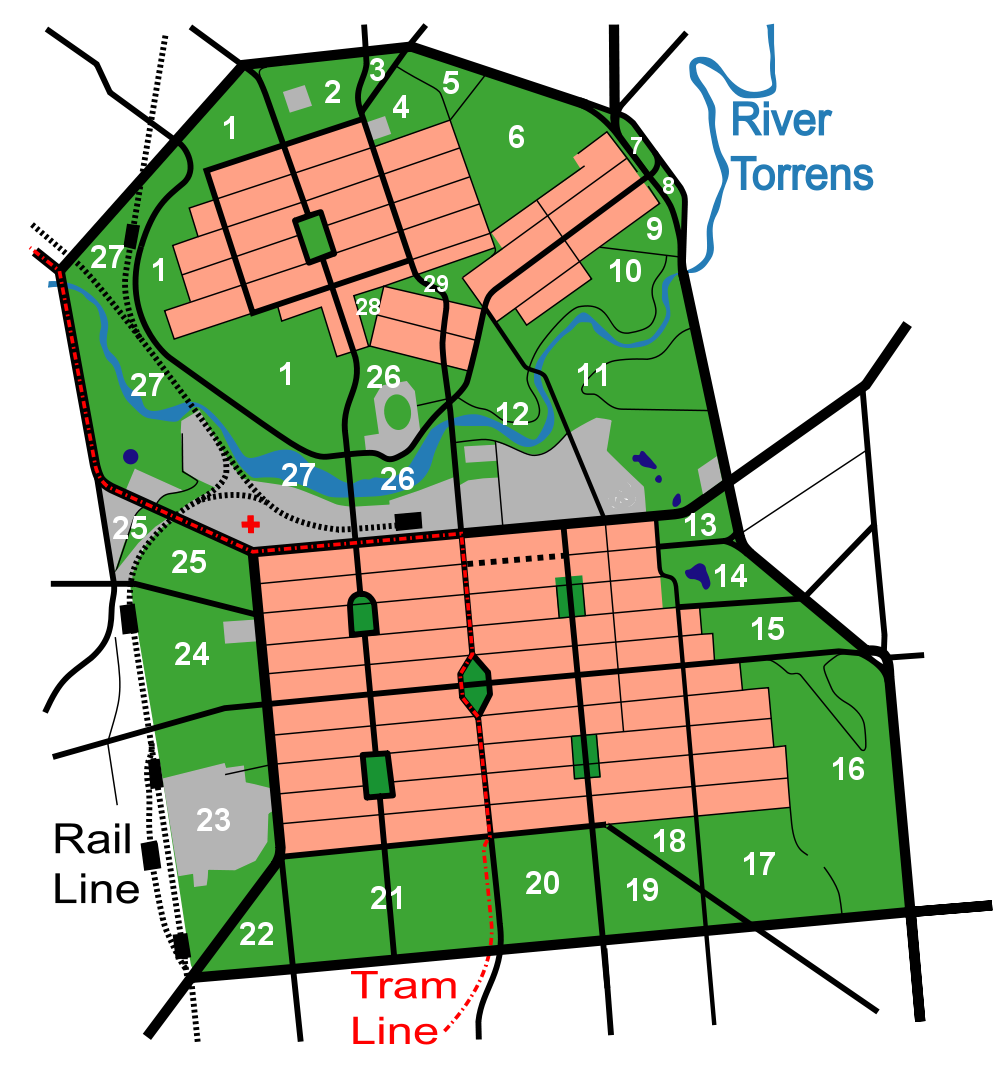
Adelaide city centre, North Adelaide and the Park Lands

Initially the new Province of South Australia was managed by Colonisation Commissioners. Colonial government commenced on 28 December 1836. The first municipality was established in 1840 as The City of Adelaide Municipal Corporation, the first municipality in the country. However, due to a combination of constitutional difficulties arising from the mayor's resignation, hostility of the incoming Governor George Grey, and falling revenues due to the onset of the colony's first economic crisis, the corporation became moribund in 1843, after the Province had become a Crown colony established by the South Australia Act 1842. From 1843 to 1849, control and management reverted to the colonial government, and from 1849 to 1852 the municipality was managed by a Commission with five members. With the positive economic effects of the Victorian gold rush, a formal municipality was re-established in 1852, and "has operated continuously ever since". However, The city's relationship with the state and federal government has been described as being 'a continually abrasive relationship'.

The Council started in 1840 with nineteen members, who chose four of their number to be Aldermen, and then one of these (James Hurtle Fisher) to be Mayor. In 1852 the municipality was divided into four wards. Three Councillors and one Alderman were chosen, who in turn selected the Mayor. In 1861 the Mayor was chosen by all the electors and the position of Alderman was temporarily abolished. In 1873 the municipality was divided into six Wards, each represented by two Councillors. In 1880 the office of Alderman was recreated; they were chosen by electors of all Wards. The office of Mayor was raised to the stature of Lord Mayor by Royal Letters Patent in 1919. The Lord Mayor received the right to be styled ‘The Right Honourable’ in 1927.

The Arms of the City of Adelaide were granted by the Heralds College in 1929. In 1982 the Council approved the design of the Armorial Flag.

In 2015, the Council became the first government of any kind in Australia to offer a financial incentive for installing battery systems.

== Governance ==
The City of Adelaide is legally defined as the capital city of South Australia by the City of Adelaide Act 1998, which also provides for a Capital City Committee, setting out its structure, function and responsibilities. The Act defines the Constitution of the council, including the role, allowances and benefits of the Lord Mayor and members. It defines the role of the CEO and their role with regard to Council employees. It continues the name of the council as "The Corporation of the City of Adelaide", and says that the land known as "The Corporation Acre" within the City of Adelaide is vested in the Adelaide City Council. It says that the name "Adelaide City Council" means the Corporation of the City of Adelaide.

As of 2019 the City of Adelaide Council consists of 12 elected members, including the Lord Mayor and 11 Area and Ward Councillors, elected for a 4-year term. Area Councillors are elected by the voters of the whole council area as one electorate, while Ward Councillors are only elected by the voters of their respective wards.

== Council ==
=== Current composition ===
The council, as of July 2026, is:

Ward	Party	Councillor	Tenure	Ref
Lord Mayor	Labor	Jane Lomax-Smith	1997–2000, 2022–present	
Area Councillors	Team Adelaide	Arman Abrahimzadeh OAM	2018–	
Area Councillors	Independent	Janet Giles	2022–	
North	Independent	Phil Martin	2014–	
North	Team Adelaide	Mary Couros	2018–	
Central	Independent	Carmel Noon	2022–2025, 2025–	
Central	Independent	Patrick Maher	2025–	
Central	Independent	Eleanor Freeman	2025–	
Central	Liberal	Alfredo Cabada	2025–	
South	Independent	Keiran Snape	2021–	
South	Labor	Mark Siebentritt	2022–	

In April 2025, the District Court declared the Central Ward portion of the 2022 South Australian local government elections. The decision saw the removal of Deputy Lord Mayor David Elliott, Councillor Simon Hou, Councillor Jing Li, and Councillor Carmel Noon. Carmel Noon was the only one of the four to regain her position on the council at a by-election later in the year.

In July 2026, South Ward elected member Henry Davis resigned. It was reported the following week that he was facing a three-month suspension from the South Australian Behavioural Standards Panel. The report said Davis “committed serious misbehaviour on three occasions" and reprimanded him “for failing to take reasonable care that his acts did not adversely affect the health and safety of other members of the Council.”

=== Area Councillors ===
2022 South Australian local elections: Area Councillors
Party	Candidate	Votes	%	±%
Team Adelaide	Arman Abrahimzadeh (elected)	1,851	22.0	
Independent	Anne Moran	1,790	21.3	
Independent	Janet Giles (elected)	1,686	20.1	
Independent Liberal	Domenico Gelonese	649	7.7	
Independent Liberal	Glenn Bain	639	7.6	
Independent	Frank Barbaro	612	7.3	
Independent	Juliette Lockwood	571	6.8	
Independent	Du Zhigang	383	4.6	
Independent	Josephine Patterson	217	2.6	
Total formal votes		8,398	97.8	+1.7
Informal votes		190	2.2	−1.7
Turnout		8,588	28.2	+0.9

=== North Ward ===
2022 South Australian local elections: North Ward
Party	Candidate	Votes	%	±%
Independent	Phil Martin (elected)	878	36.0	
Team Adelaide	Mary Couros (elected)	659	27.1	
Independent	Sandy Wilkinson	410	16.8	
Independent	Valdis Dunis	289	11.9	
Independent	Robert Farnan	200	8.2	
Total formal votes		2,436	98.0	
Informal votes		50	2.0	
Turnout		2,486	34.7	

=== Central Ward ===
2022 South Australian local elections: Central Ward
Party	Candidate	Votes	%	±%
Independent Labor	Jing Li (elected)	508	15.4	
Independent	Carmel Noon (elected)	466	14.2	
Team Adelaide	Simon Hou (elected)	355	10.8	
Team Adelaide	Alexander Hyde	338	10.3	
Independent Labor	David Elliot (elected)	337	10.2	
Independent	Mark Hamilton	315	9.6	
Independent Liberal	Gagan Sharma	238	7.2	
Team Adelaide	Franz Knoll	176	5.3	
Independent	Ben Ayris	135	4.1	
Independent	Fiona Hui	119	3.6	
Independent	Alex Radda	97	2.9	
Independent	Cassandra Papalia	75	2.3	
Independent	Hugo Siu	68	2.1	
Independent	Tammy Vo	65	2.0	
Total formal votes		3,292	97.3	
Informal votes		90	2.7	
Turnout		3,382	24.3	

=== South Ward ===
2022 South Australian local elections: South Ward
Party	Candidate	Votes	%	±%
Independent Greens	Keiran Snape (elected)	758	27.4	
Independent	Colette Slight	277	10.0	
Independent Labor	Mark Siebentritt (elected)	275	9.9	
Independent Liberal	Henry Davis (elected)	263	9.5	
Independent	Theo Vlassis	241	8.7	
Independent Greens	Sean Cullen-Macaskill	199	7.2	
Independent	Ida Jonassen Llewellyn-Smith	165	5.7	
Independent Labor	Kimberlee Brown	146	5.3	
Independent Liberal	Helika Cruz	139	5.0	
Independent Liberal	Tim Scott	138	5.0	
Independent Greens	Sue McKay	115	4.2	
Independent	Param Ramanan	51	1.8	
Total formal votes		2,767	97.3	
Informal votes		76	2.7	
Turnout		2,843	30.5	

== Population ==
At the end of the 20th century, the city had little more than thirty per cent of the population it had in 1915 (when the population reached more than 43,000), and about 5,000 less than the 1855 population of 18,259. In proposing reforms and his advocacy for town planning legislation, Charles Reade illustrated the Adelaide slums associated with the city's high population levels with lantern-slides accompanying his lecture "Garden cities v. Adelaide slums and suburbs" in the Adelaide Town Hall on 8 Oct 1914. Reade was attacked by the Adelaide City Council who fought against the Town Planning and Housing Bill reforms and the press pointed out the wickedness of families being forced to 'herd together more and more in overcrowded conditions of living' and the 'sheer nonsense on the part of the City Council to pretend' that there were no slums in the city:

The City Council does not want to learn. It seems to want the slum owners to be left untouched so that the landlords may reap their harvest of gold while the poor of this city reap their harvest of suffering, disease, and other ills associated with bad housing.

In seeking a return to higher density population levels, Adelaide City Council launched its 'New Directions' with its three themes of Capacity, Vivacity and Audacity on 3 July 2001. The "Capacity" theme proposed doubling the city's population by 2010 and increasing the number of City visitors and workers.

According to the Annual Reports, the population has increased rapidly, due to the targets stated in the strategic plans developed at about that time.

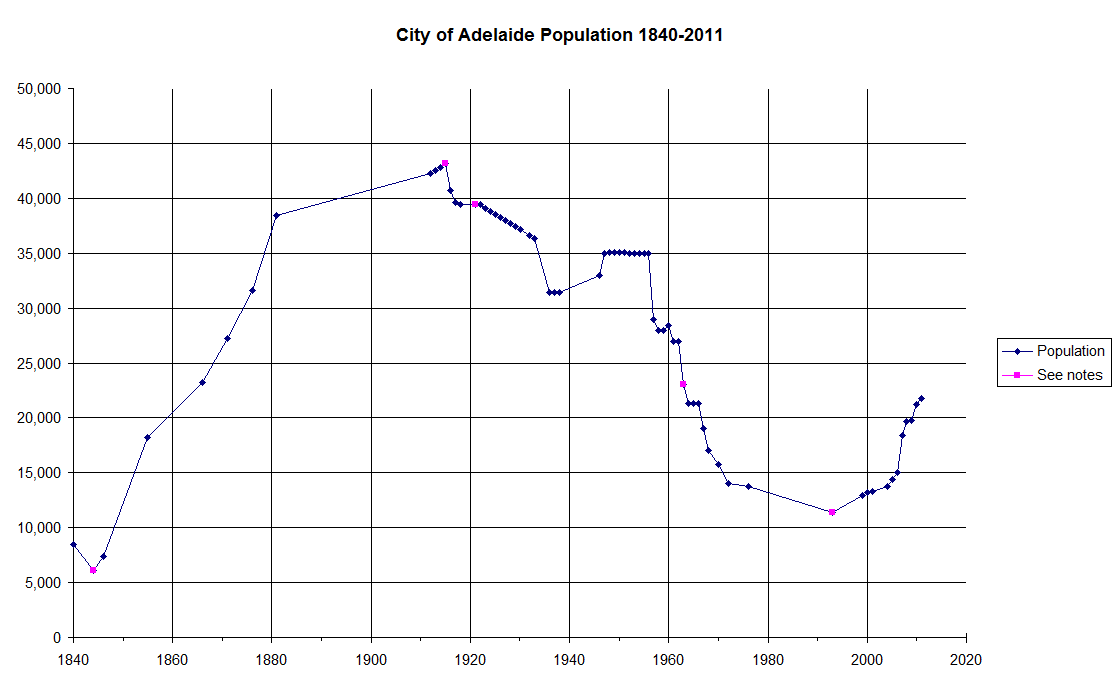

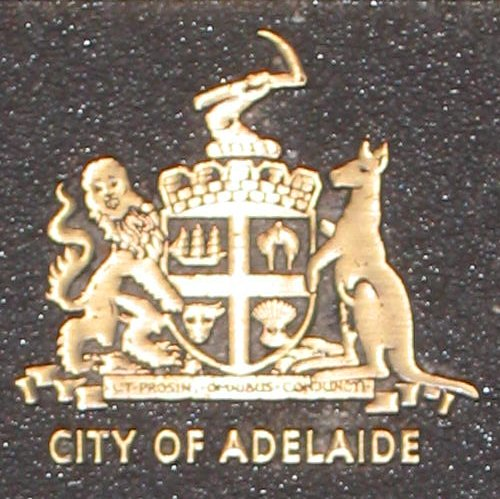
Coat of arms

Notes

- The population figures have been extracted from Adelaide City Council Annual reports. The data is summarised on pages 149-150 of A Thematic History. Additional data not in that summary can be found in the reports on the council's "Annual Reports" page.
- 1840 The initial Annual Report noted a population of 8,480, with 1,615 buildings in the city.
- 1844 The second available figure (6,107) is also the minimum recorded in council reports.
- 1880s There are no figures available for the period between 1881 and 1912. South Australia suffered a severe depression in the 1880s when the State population, (and probably the city's population too), declined.
- 1915 The peak population was 43,133.
- 1921 The State population passes 500,000. The city population was 39,458.
- 1963 The State population passes 1,000,000. The city population was 23,000.
- 1993 There is only one figure available between 1976 and 1999 – 11,405 in 1993. It was in the late 1990s that the council developed and started implementing its plans to increase the city's population, and not until 2004 when it started regularly updating the population estimates based on figures supplied by the Bureau of Census and Statistics.
- 2001 In 2001, the council set targets for population numbers for 2006 and 2010. These targets were raised considerably in 2003. In 2009, targets were set for 2012.

The following table sets out the figures of various types of city population in the 21st century:

Year	2016–17	2015–16	2014–15	2013–14	2012–13	2011–12	2010–11	2009–10	2008–09	2007–08	2006–07	2005–06	2004–05	2003–04	2002–03	2001–02	2000–01	2006 goal	2010 goal	2012 goal
Permanent residents	23,396	23,169	22,690	22,200	21,600	22,000	21,800	21,200	19,800	19,700	18,400	15,000	14,361	13,734			13,289	~~16,000~~; 25,000	~~25,000~~; 34,000	25,500
Dwellings	11,546	10,860	11,467	10,860	10,860		13,100	12,500	11,388	10,600	9,900	9,900	9,600	7,335	7,335		5,510			
Overnight population						28,000	29,800	29,200	27,400	27,100	23,800	22,000	21,090	19,610	17,861	17,861	19,900			34,500
Overnight visitors						6,000	8,000	8,000	7,600	7,400	5,400	7,000	6,729	5,866						
Daily visitors(*)	311,414	262,000	228,673	228,670	228,670		86,500	79,000	74,000	60,000	75,000	75,000	75,000	103,500	103,500			125,000	150,000	
Workers	115,250	122,700	122,700	118,200	118,200	118,000	126,500	126,500	118,500	108,000	108,000	99,000	95,682	93,000	93,000		89,000	98,000	111,000	125,000
Students	67,100	64,000	64,000	86,700			90,000	88,000	86,700	81,100	75,000	63,000	59,240	51,900	50,597		50,000	58,000	66,000	
Daily population								220,000	205,000	208,200	190,000	200,000	200,000	216,000	215,000					
Office space(**)								1.503	1.443	1.200	1.184	1.038	1.100	1.109						

* Visitors to the city from the Adelaide Metropolitan area, for all purposes
** Square kilometres (millions of square metres) of office space. i.e. 1.503 km^{2} = 1,503,000 sq. metres.

== Adelaide Park Lands ==
The city's 2010–11 Annual Report noted that the total area of the City of Adelaide is 15.6 km^{2}, of which 7.6 km^{2} is Park Lands. Other sources put the Park Lands area closer to 7.0 km^{2}. The original area was 2,300 acres (9.3 km^{2)}, a number the Council still regularly quotes.

== Services and amenities ==
The City of Adelaide's administrative offices are located in the Colonel William Light Centre building at 25 Pirie Street, adjacent to the Adelaide Town Hall in King William Street.

Apart from providing the usual services like rubbish collection and controlling local development, the City of Adelaide owns and operates a number of city services and amenities, including:

- A network of 10 car parking stations (Andrew, Central Market, Flinders, Frome, Gawler, Grote, Light Square, Pirie, Rundle, Topham and Wyatt) branded as UPark.
- Adelaide Central Market, a popular tourist attraction and working market selling cheap fruit and vegetables and other products.
- Adelaide Aquatic Centre, offering several indoor heated swimming pools, diving facilities, and a health club.
- A network of local library and community centres from which local residents can borrow books, music, videos and computer programs, and gain access to computers and the internet.
- The council also runs a free bicycle service on weekdays, in conjunction with Bikes SA.
- Free bus services, 98C and 98A,(operated as The Connector until 2014), which runs through the central business district and North Adelaide, with stops at every major tourist attraction and council library. A new connector bus, with more seating capacity, entered service in 2007, replacing one of the smaller buses that used to ply the route. The bus is named Tindo (after the Kaurna word for sun) and is hailed as the world's first solar powered bus. The 98C is a clockwise loop while the 98A is anti-clockwise and the service has now been modified to better suit everyone's needs. The 97 was a temporary free bus which used to run for a few months.

== Sister cities ==
The City of Adelaide has been involved in the Sister Cities program since 1972. As of 2023 it has long-term international partnership arrangements with five cities, known as sister cities, based on formal agreements between Adelaide and each city. This allows collaboration in the cultural, educational, business, and technical spheres. The five sister cities are:

- (United States) Austin, Texas, USA, since 1983
- Christchurch, New Zealand, since 1972
- George Town, Penang, Malaysia, since 1973
- Himeji, Hyogo, Japan, since 1982
- Qingdao, Shandong, China, since 2013

Two cities are known as Friendship Cities, based on informal partnerships between two cities that promote collaboration and a friendly relationship between two cities:

- Dalian, Liaoning, China
- Chengdu, Sichuan, China

== Flag ==
Flag of the City of Adelaide

The armorial flag of Adelaide was approved on 2 August 1982, replacing the unofficial coat of arms on white background, which had been flown outside the Town Hall on special occasions for about 50 years.

== Key to the City ==
The Key to the city is presented by the Lord Mayor to an individual or group to acknowledge and recognise their outstanding contribution to the city of Adelaide.

Year	Name/Group
1991	Governor Michael Dukakis
1991	Captain Anthony Sturt
1992	David Hookes
1992	The 14th Dalai Lama
1992	The Salvation Army
1993	John Fitzgerald OAM
1994	Reverend Ivor Bailey AM
1995	Archbishop Stylianos Harkianakis
1996	Mark Woodforde
1996	1996 S.A. Sheffield Shield Cricket Team
1996	Adelaide Girls Choir
1996	Dr Andrew Thomas AO
1996	The Ecumenical Patriarch Vartholomeos 1
1996	Dame Roma Mitchell AC DBE CVO QC
1997	HMAS Adelaide
1997	Maritime Patrol Group RAAF Edinburgh
1997	Adelaide Football Club
1998	Adelaide Lightning Women's Basketball Team
1998	Adelaide 36ers Men's Basketball Team
1998	Band of the South Australia Police
1998	Adelaide Thunderbirds Netball Team
1999	Stuart O'Grady OAM
2001	Lleyton Hewitt AM
2001	Dr Jeffery Tate
2003	Mark Ricciuto
2003	Barry Humphries AO CBE
2004	John Coetzee
2004	Port Adelaide Football Club
2004	Rupert Murdoch AC KCSG
2006	Dr Bill Griggs AM
2008	Adelaide United Soccer Team
2010	Cheong Yew Liew OAM
2017	Adelaide Football Club Women's Team
2017	Gillian Rolton AM
2018	Mike Turtur AO
2021	Uncle Lewis Yerloburka O'Brien AO

== Notable residents ==
- William Bragg – Nobel Laureate of Physics – X-ray crystallography as a method for 3-D structure determination of inorganic salts
- Robin Warren – Nobel Laureate of Medicine – Discovered role of Helicobacter pylori in gastric ulcers
- Paul McDermott – Host of Good News Week

== See also ==
- List of mayors and lord mayors of Adelaide
- List of Adelaide parks and gardens
- List of Adelaide suburbs
- Local government areas of South Australia
