= 2018 South Australian local elections =

- 22 October−9 November 2018
- Registered: 1,213,862
- Turnout: 398,215 (▲0.95)

The 2018 South Australian local elections were held in November 2018 to elect the councils of 67 of the 68 local government areas (LGAs) in South Australia. Many councils also held mayoral elections.

As per usual, no election was held in Roxby Council as it is served by an administrator who performs all the functions of a council.

At the close of nominations on 18 September, a total of 1,374 candidates had been nominated for mayoral or councillor positions. 23 elections were uncontested, resulting in 48 candidates being elected unopposed. Three elections partially failed, resulting in follow-up supplementary elections to fill five unfilled positions.

The highest turnout was in Kimba, with 81.0% of voting packs returned, while the highest turnout in the metropolitan area was 34.3% in Holdfast Bay.

== Party changes before elections ==
A number of councillors joined or left parties before the 2018 elections.

Council	Ward	Councillor	Former party	New party	Date
Onkaparinga	South Coast	Hazel Wainwright	SA Best	Independent	27 May 2017
Onkaparinga	Knox	Heidi Greaves	Liberal	Conservatives	16 February 2018
Onkaparinga	South Coast	Hazel Wainwright	Independent	SA Best	9 May 2018
