= Gaunt =

Gaunt may refer to:

== Places ==
- Ghent, Belgium was formerly called Gaunt

== People with the name Gaunt ==
- David Gaunt (b. 1944), British historian
- David Gaunt, owner of Gleebooks bookshop in Sydney, Australia
- Elizabeth Gaunt (d. 1685), convicted traitor
- Ernest Gaunt (1865–1940), British admiral, born in Australia
- Genevieve Gaunt (born 1991), Dutch-British actress
- George W. F. Gaunt (1865–1918), President of the New Jersey State Senate
- Guy Gaunt (1870–1953), British admiral, brother of Ernest
- Hilda Gaunt (1906-1974), Royal Ballet pianist
- John of Gaunt (1340–1399), English prince
- Jon Gaunt (born 1961), British radio presenter and newspaper columnist, late 20th and early 21st century
- Keegan Gaunt (born 2000), Canadian para-athletics middle-distance runner
- Maurice de Gaunt (fl. 1225), founder of Beverston Castle
- Nathan Gaunt (living), an Australian singer-songwriter
- Thomas Gaunt (1829–1890), jeweller and clockmaker of Melbourne, Australia

=== Fictional characters ===
- Gaunt is a playable character from the video game Quake III Arena's expansion pack Quake 3 Team Arena
- Leland Gaunt, the antagonist in the Stephen King novel, Needful Things
- The House of Gaunt, a wizard family in the Harry Potter book series
- Nightgaunt, a fictional race created by H. P. Lovecraft
- In Warhammer 40,000:
  - The Gaunt's Ghosts book series
    - Ibram Gaunt, an Imperial Guard officer and main character of the above series
    - Gaunt's Ghosts, the colloquial name for the Tanith First-and-Only regiment
  - Gaunt, two Tyranid units: Termagaunts and Hormagaunts
- Edward Gaunt, a character from Robert Holdstock's book, Lavondyss
- John Gaunt, eponymous protagonist of Grimjack
- A pseudonym of Spider-Man villain Mendel Stromm

== Other ==
- Gaunt, 1931 film with Ralph Lewis
- Gaunt's formula, a mathematical formula dealing with associated Legendre polynomials
- Gaunt (band), a punk rock band from Columbus, Ohio
- Emaciated
