= William Bundey =

William Bundey may refer to:

- William Bundey (mayor) (1826–1889), mayor of Adelaide, South Australia 1883 to 1886
- William Henry Bundey (1838–1909), Australian politician and judge, Attorney-General of South Australia 1878 to 1881
