= Adelaide Town Hall =

Heritage listed building in Adelaide, South Australia

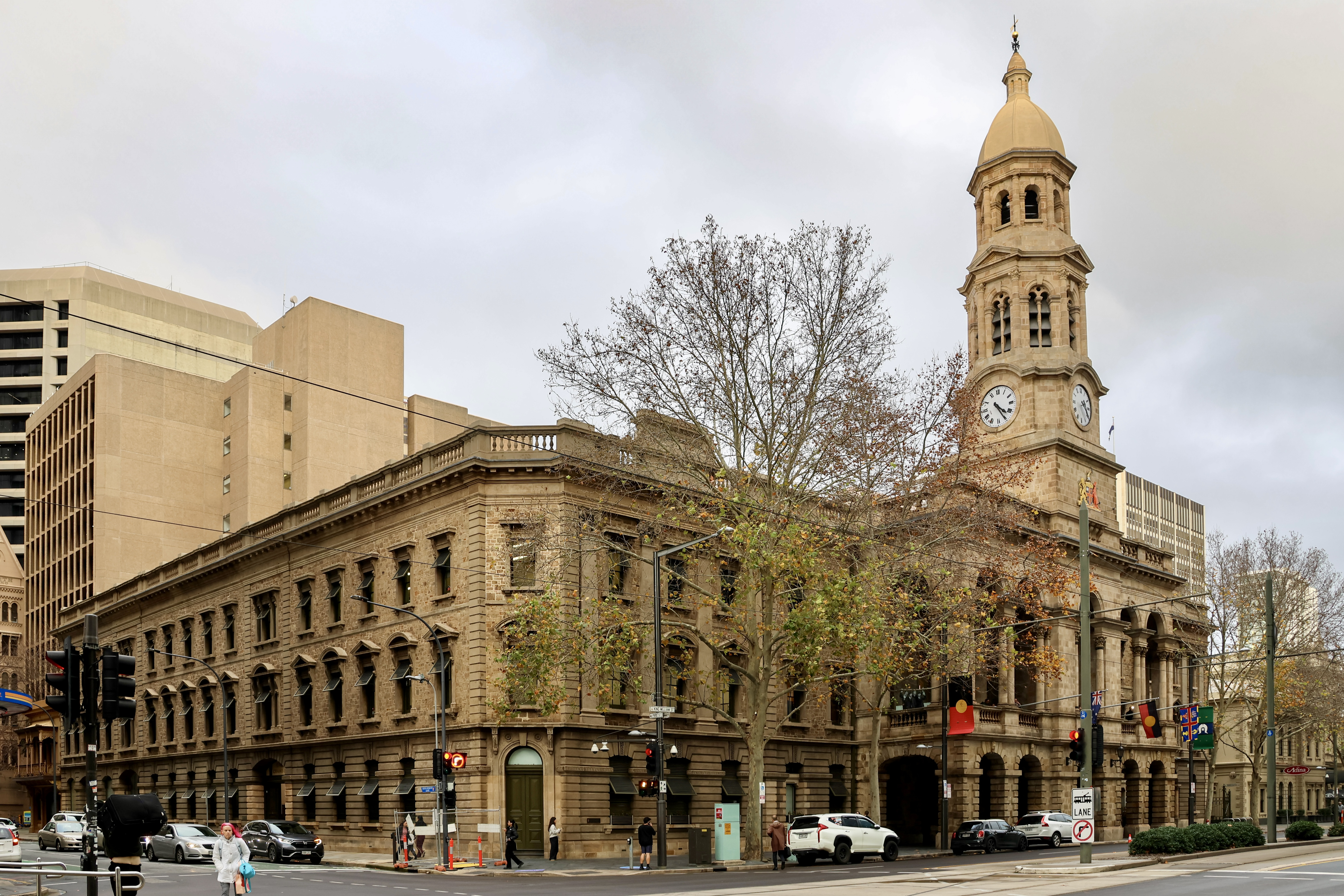
- Front view of Adelaide Town Hall, 2026

General information
- Type: Town hall
- Architectural style: Classical Revival with Corinthian order
- Location: 128 King William Street, Adelaide, Australia
- Coordinates: 34°55′33.96″S 138°36′0.66″E
- Year built: 1863–1866
- Inaugurated: 20 June 1866
- Renovated: 2025
- Cost: A£24,000
- Owner: City of Adelaide

Height
- Height: 150 feet (46 m)

Technical details
- Material: Freestone and bluestone
- Floor count: 6
- Grounds: 1 acre (4,000 m^{2})

Design and construction
- Architecture firm: Wright & Woods
- Other designers: Dean Berry
- Main contractor: English & Brown

Renovating team
- Architect: Swanbury Penglase Architects
- Renovating firm: Duratec

Website
- www.adelaidetownhall.com.au

South Australian Heritage Register
- Official name: Adelaide Town Hall Complex
- Designated: 24 July 1980
- Reference no.: 10859

Adelaide Town Hall is a civic building on King William Street in Adelaide, South Australia. It houses the Lord Mayor's chambers, Adelaide City Council offices, and spaces for meetings, concerts and public functions. Edmund Wright and Edward Woods designed the building in the Classical Revival style, with a symmetrical, colonnaded façade and Corinthian detailing. Built primarily from local freestone and bluestone, it features the Albert Tower, a clock and bell tower approximately 150 feet (46 m) high.

Construction began in March 1863 after Wright and Woods won an architectural competition. Governor Dominic Daly officially opened the town hall on 20 June 1866. Extensions between 1869 and 1882 added wings and council chambers. Later work included the installation of the clock tower in 1935, interior refurbishments and façade conservation between 2023 and 2025.

The town hall has hosted civic receptions, meetings associated with Australian federation, and concerts. The Beatles appeared on its balcony during their Australian tour in June 1964. Its auditorium contains a pipe organ installed in 1990, replacing an instrument inaugurated in 1877. The building also houses the Adelaide City Civic Collection of artworks, historical records and ceremonial objects.

== History ==
=== 19th century ===
Adelaide City Council was re-established in 1852, with James Hurtle Fisher as mayor. In 1857, the council announced an architectural competition for a new town hall on Town Acre 203, at the corner of King William and Pirie streets. Edmund Wright won in 1858, but the council could not raise the funds to proceed. He became mayor the following year. Wright and Edward Woods won a second competition on 20 January 1863, and their design formed the basis of Adelaide Town Hall.

Construction commenced in March 1863, and the foundation stone was laid by Governor Dominic Daly on 4 May 1863. On 13 January 1864, the foundation stone for the Albert Tower was laid during a public ceremony. A sealed bottle containing a parchment document was placed beneath the foundation stone, recording the city council's decision to name the tower in memory of Prince Albert of Saxe-Coburg and Gotha, who had died in 1861. The document was dated in the 27th year of the Victorian era and signed by Mayor Samuel Goode and Town Clerk W. A. Hughes. At the ceremony, the contractors, English & Brown, were reported to be making rapid progress on the building works. Thomas English resigned as mayor as his firm began construction of the Adelaide Town Hall. A panoramic view of the city was taken during the construction period in 1865 by a photographer named Townsend Duryea from the scaffolding around the incomplete Albert Tower, and in November that same year, a topping out ceremony was conducted on the scaffolding in the presence of South Australians.

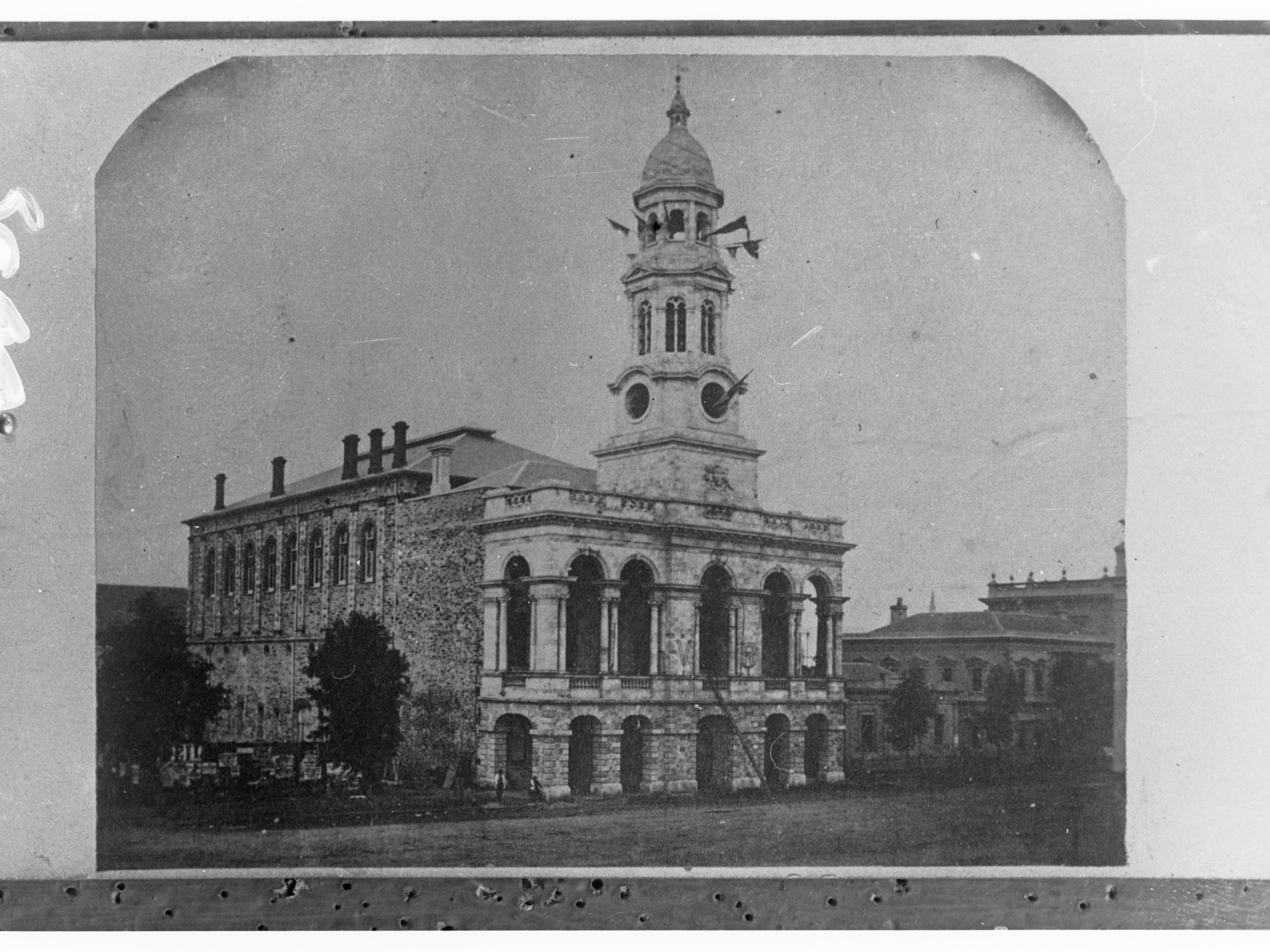
The Adelaide Town Hall before the installation of the clock, with flags decorating the Albert Tower, c. 1866

Following its completion in 1866, Adelaide Town Hall was regarded as one of the largest city halls in the Southern Hemisphere, alongside the adjacent General Post Office. Daly officially opened it on 20 June 1866. Celebrations included a banquet for around 800 guests, a ball on 22 June and an opening concert on 26 June. The opening also featured the commissioning and ringing of eight bells installed in the Albert Tower. Over time, the town hall underwent a series of extensions, including the addition of the Queen's Chambers and south wing in 1869, Eagle Chambers in 1876, council chambers in 1880, and Gladstone Chambers in 1882.

=== 20th century ===
Adelaide Town Hall was also used for organisational meetings associated with Australian federation movements, including the Anti-Convention Bill League, the Australasian Federation League of South Australia, and the Commonwealth Bill League. On 1 January 1901, Hallam Tennyson, 2nd Baron Tennyson, was sworn in at the town hall as the first Governor of South Australia after federation. In 1904, it was the site of a riot during a speech by John Alexander Dowie, with thousands reportedly gathered outside in protest.

Although the Albert Tower was originally conceived as a clock tower, it remained without a clock for several decades following its construction. On 20 February 1935, Councillor Lavington Bonython presented the City of Adelaide with a clock manufactured by Thomas Gaunt & Co. of Melbourne. The installation included an eight-bell chiming mechanism that sounded the hours across the central business district. Subsequent alterations to the town hall complex were undertaken throughout the 20th century, including substantial refurbishment of the foyer in the 1950s, which involved the addition of a marble staircase and new entrance doors designed by architect Dean Berry.

During the 20th century, the town hall became established as a prominent cultural venue, hosting concerts and performances by ensembles such as the Adelaide Symphony Orchestra, the Australian Chamber Orchestra, the Australian String Quartet, and Musica Viva Australia. The town hall hosted a civic reception for Donald Campbell following his land speed record at Lake Eyre. In June 1964, the Beatles appeared on the town hall balcony during their Australian tour, drawing more than 30,000 fans to the vicinity, according to the History Trust of South Australia. Further comprehensive renovations to the town hall were carried out during the 1980s.

=== 21st century ===
On 11 September 2023, conservation work began on the façade of Adelaide Town Hall after assessments identified deteriorating materials and structural integrity. Duratec, in collaboration with Swanbury Penglase Architects, undertook the project, which initial reports described as an A$4.6 million program of façade conservation and structural repairs. Subsequent reporting indicated that the overall conservation effort increased in scope, with the total cost rising to approximately $6.2 million over the course of works carried out between 2023 and 2025, reflecting expanded restoration requirements and additional remedial interventions.

== Pipe organ ==
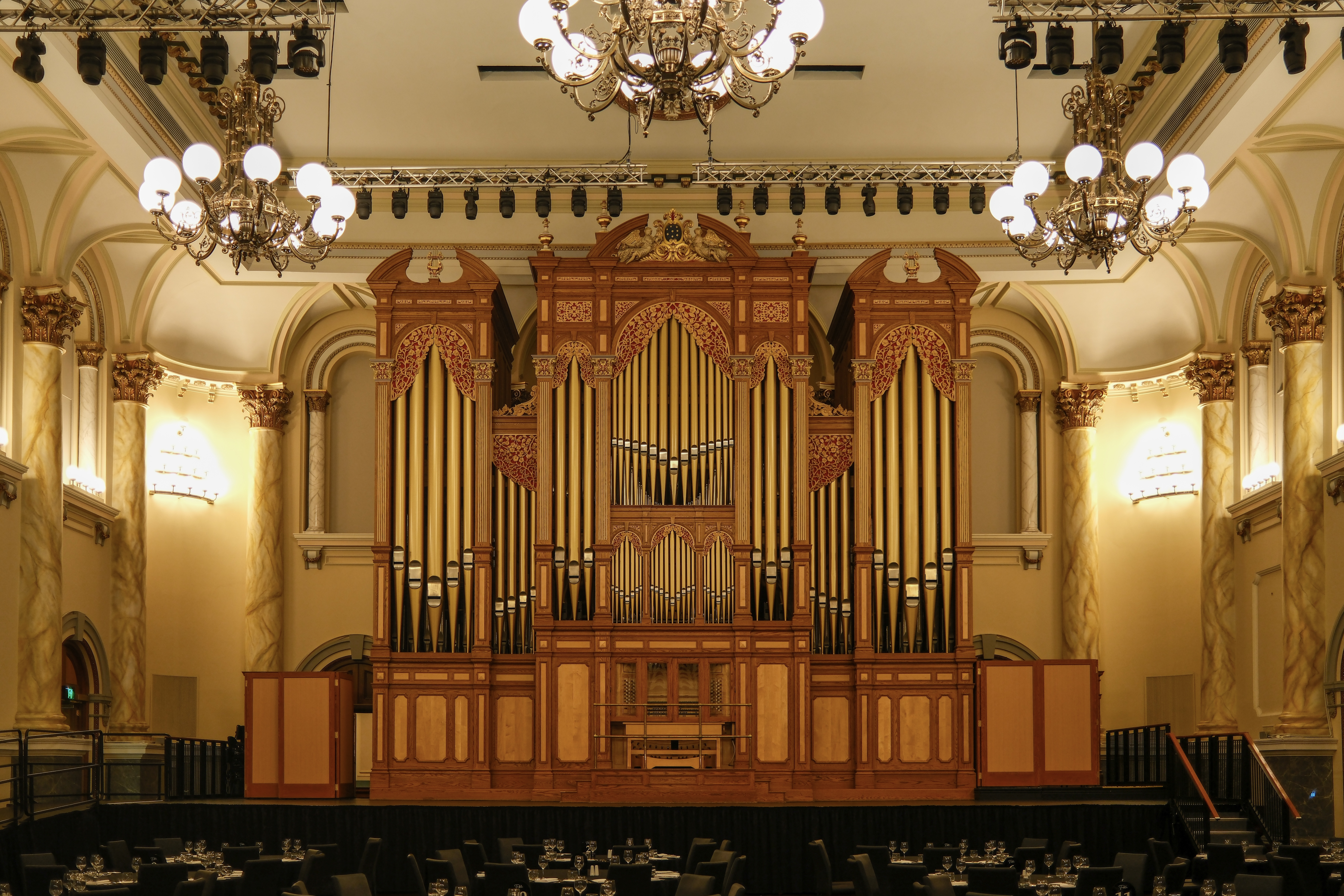
The pipe organ inside the auditorium

Following the completion of Adelaide Town Hall, a fundraising campaign was undertaken to install a pipe organ in the auditorium. Early funds raised by local musicians (£120) were initially redirected to cover the cost of bells for the Albert Tower, after which the Adelaide Philharmonic Society continued fundraising efforts, holding 25 concerts over six years and raising more than £500. By 1875, the city council approved the purchase of an organ from William Hill & Son of London, selected for its expandable modular design. The instrument was installed in 1877 following substantial reconstruction of the auditorium by Wright, including the provision of a new platform and orchestral space to accommodate the organ. It was inaugurated on 2 October 1877 at a concert featuring a mass choir conducted by George Oughton and performances by David Lee, with the total cost of the instrument recorded at £2,106.

The organ was subsequently expanded in 1886 with additional solo stops supplied by Fincham & Hobday, reflecting its modular design. The organ attracted criticism for its pitch, which was considered incompatible with contemporary orchestral standards; while some advocated for adjustment, others noted its structural limitations and long-established configuration. Mechanical upgrades were introduced over time, including the replacement of its hydraulic engine with an electric motor in 1923, although these modifications did not fully modernise the instrument. By the late 20th century, the organ was considered technologically outdated and was ultimately replaced in 1989, with the original pipe organ superseded by an English organ installed in 1990.

== Description and features ==
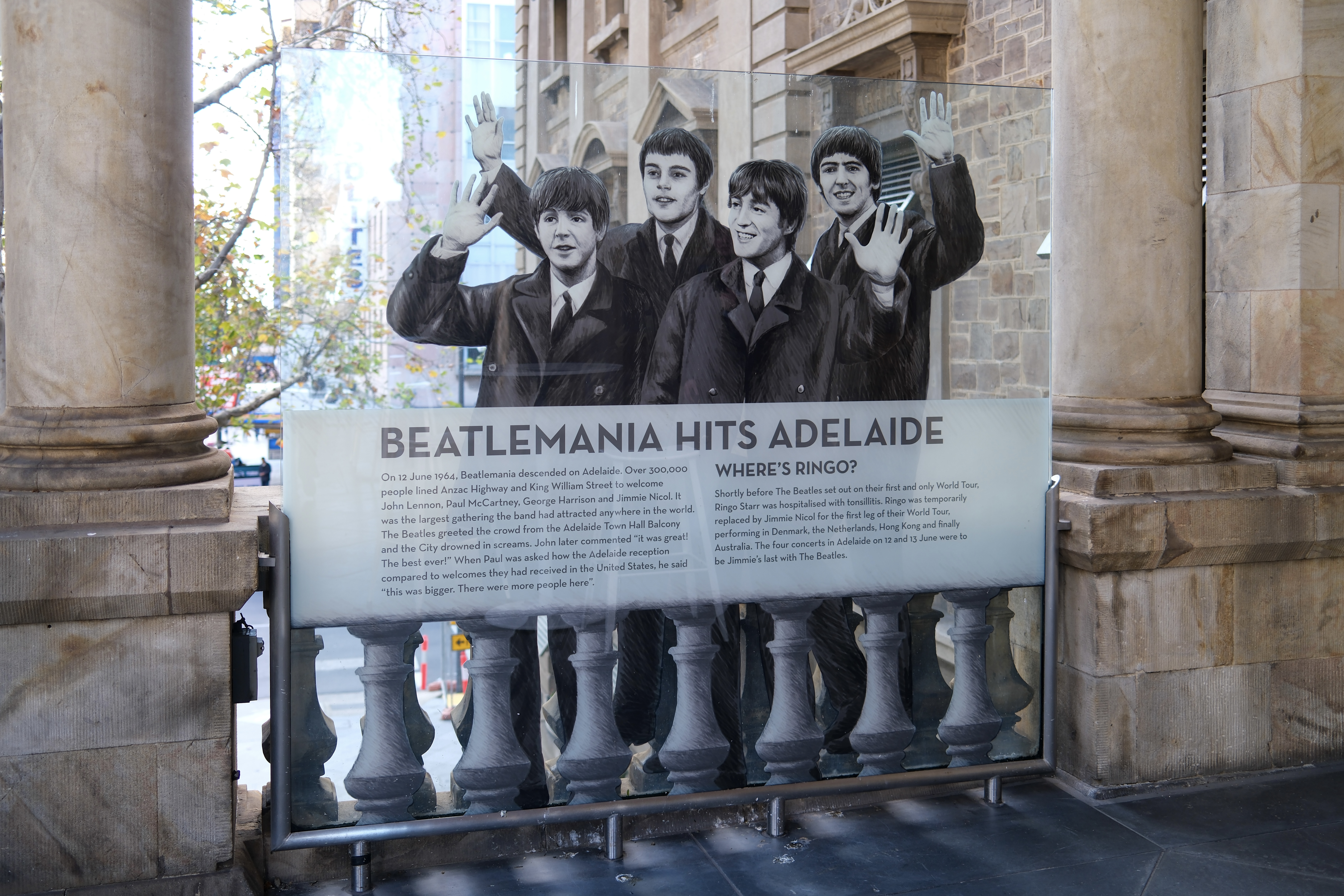
Glass artwork of The Beatles displayed on the balcony of the town hall, 2026

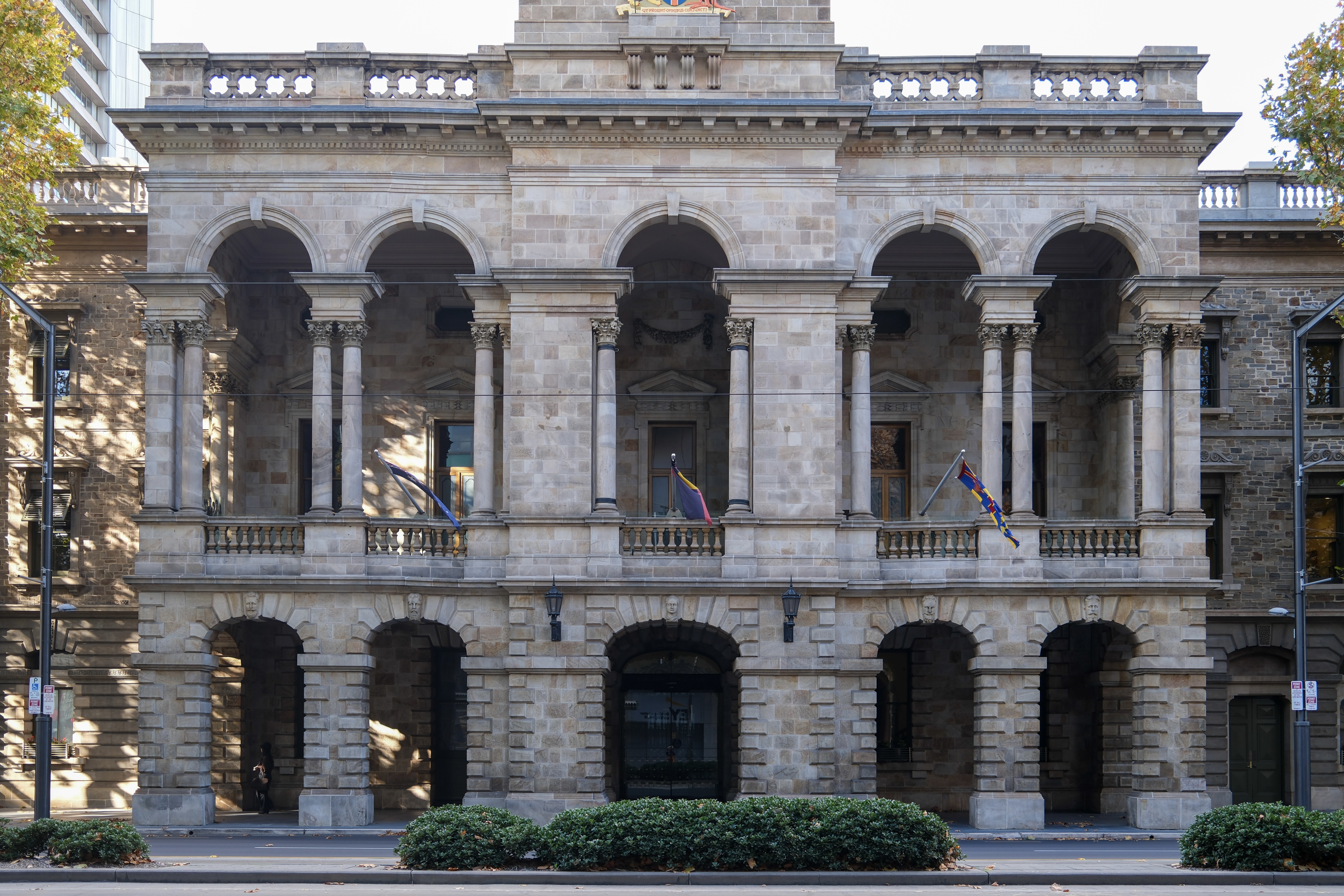
Front principal façade of the building

The Adelaide Town Hall was designed in the Classical Revival style, characterised by its symmetrical composition and ornamental Corinthian detailing, which represented the architectural debate between Classicist and Gothic Revival traditions of the 19th century. The original building was constructed primarily from locally sourced Dry Creek bluestone and Tea Tree Gully freestone, after the Adelaide City Council approved additional funding to replace the originally proposed stucco with stone. The carved keystones on the principal façade depict Queen Victoria, Prince Albert, and Daly. The building has a frontage of 73 feet (22 m) to King William Street and rises 55 feet above the colonnade. Over time, the town hall complex expanded through the addition of adjoining structures, including a wing incorporating part of the former Prince Alfred Hotel.

The Albert Tower rises approximately 150 feet above Adelaide Town Hall's colonnaded façade. Together with the Victoria Tower of the General Post Office, it formed a landmark of Adelaide's 19th-century skyline. The tower comprises six storeys and features the City of Adelaide coat of arms at its base, a four-faced clock, an octagonal bell chamber supported by Corinthian columns, pediments and arched openings, an upper stage with eight semicircular-headed openings, and a dome and cupola lantern surmounted by a cast-iron weather vane reguilded using gold leaf sourced from Florence. Constructed primarily of bluestone with cornices, plinths, and dressed stone quoins, the tower was ornamented on its principal façade, while decoration on the sides was kept relatively simple because adjoining commercial buildings were expected to obscure them.

The Adelaide Town Hall houses the Adelaide City Civic Collection, a collection of artefacts, artworks, civic objects, and other memorabilia assembled by successive Adelaide councils since 1853. The collection includes items associated with Queen Adelaide and William Light; ceremonial objects such as the mayoral chain and mace; gifts from Adelaide's sister cities; the Victoria Cross of Roy Inwood; and other historic memorials, statues, diaries, maps and photographs. A watercolour of the town hall by Edmund Gouldsmith was featured on a 43-cent postage stamp issued by the Australian Post Office in 1990. In 2016, a glass artwork was installed on the town hall balcony to commemorate the 150th anniversary of the building and The Beatles' 1964 visit to Adelaide.

== Gallery ==
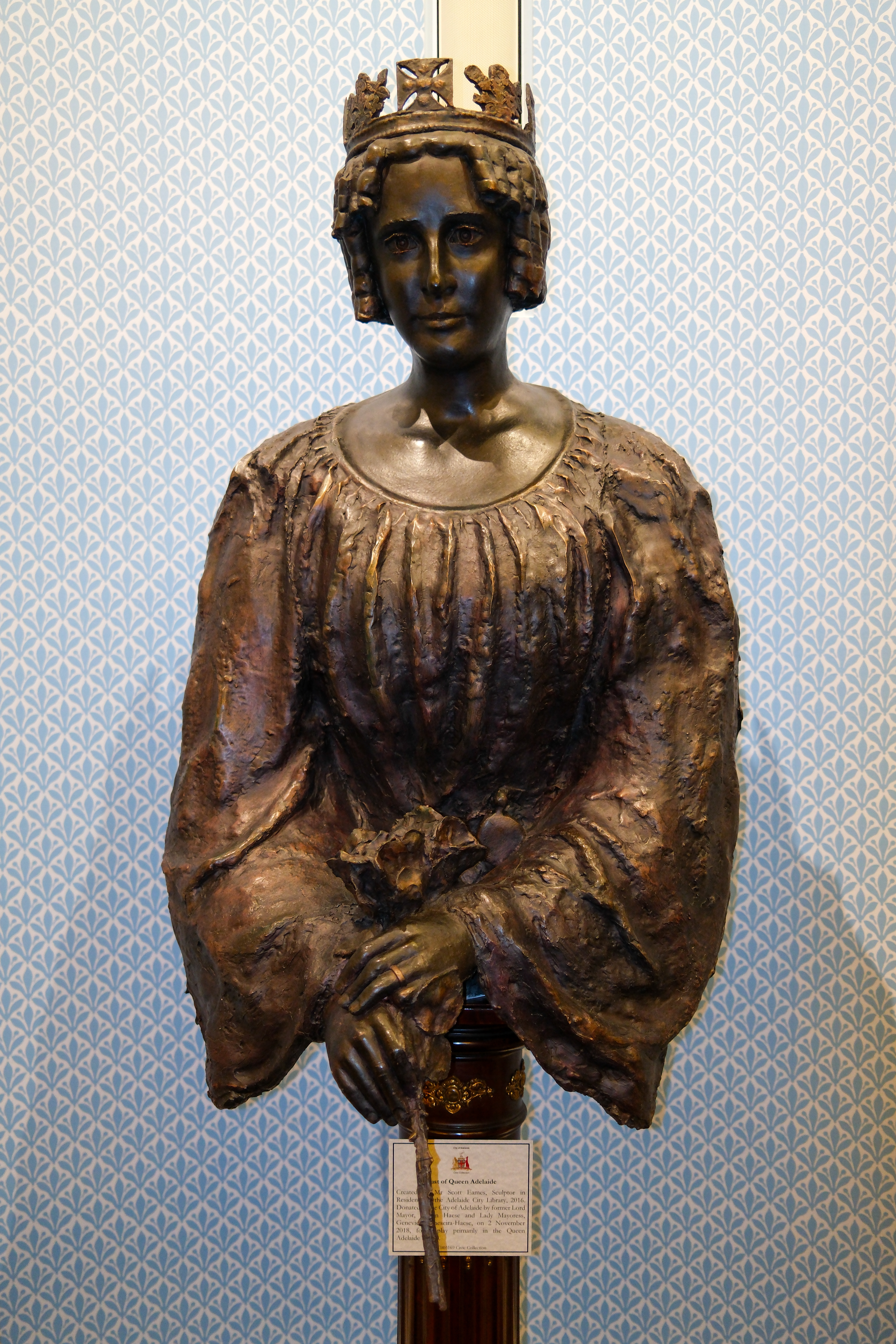
Bust of Queen Adelaide in the Queen Adelaide Room

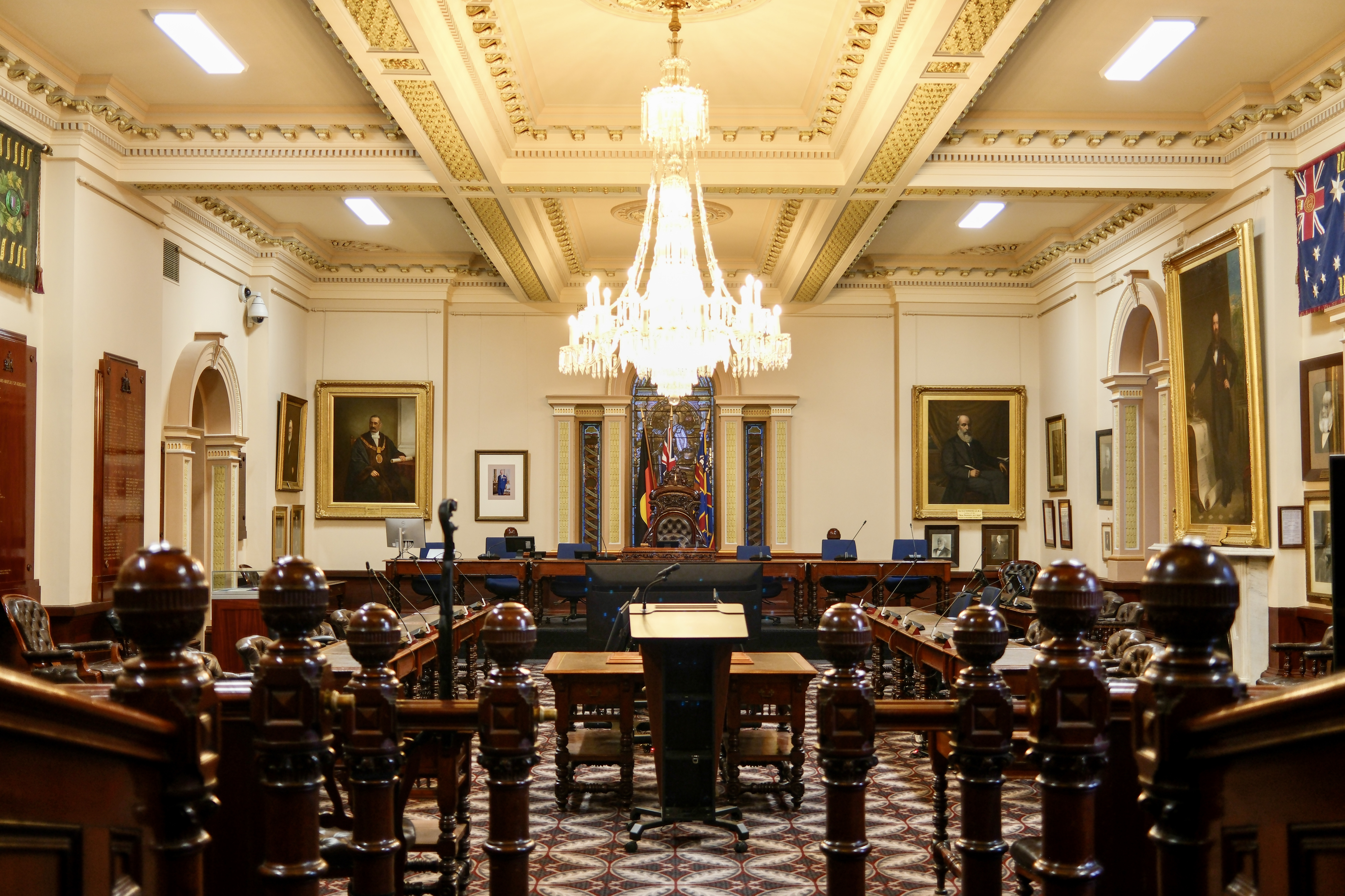
Portraits displayed on the walls of the town hall council chamber

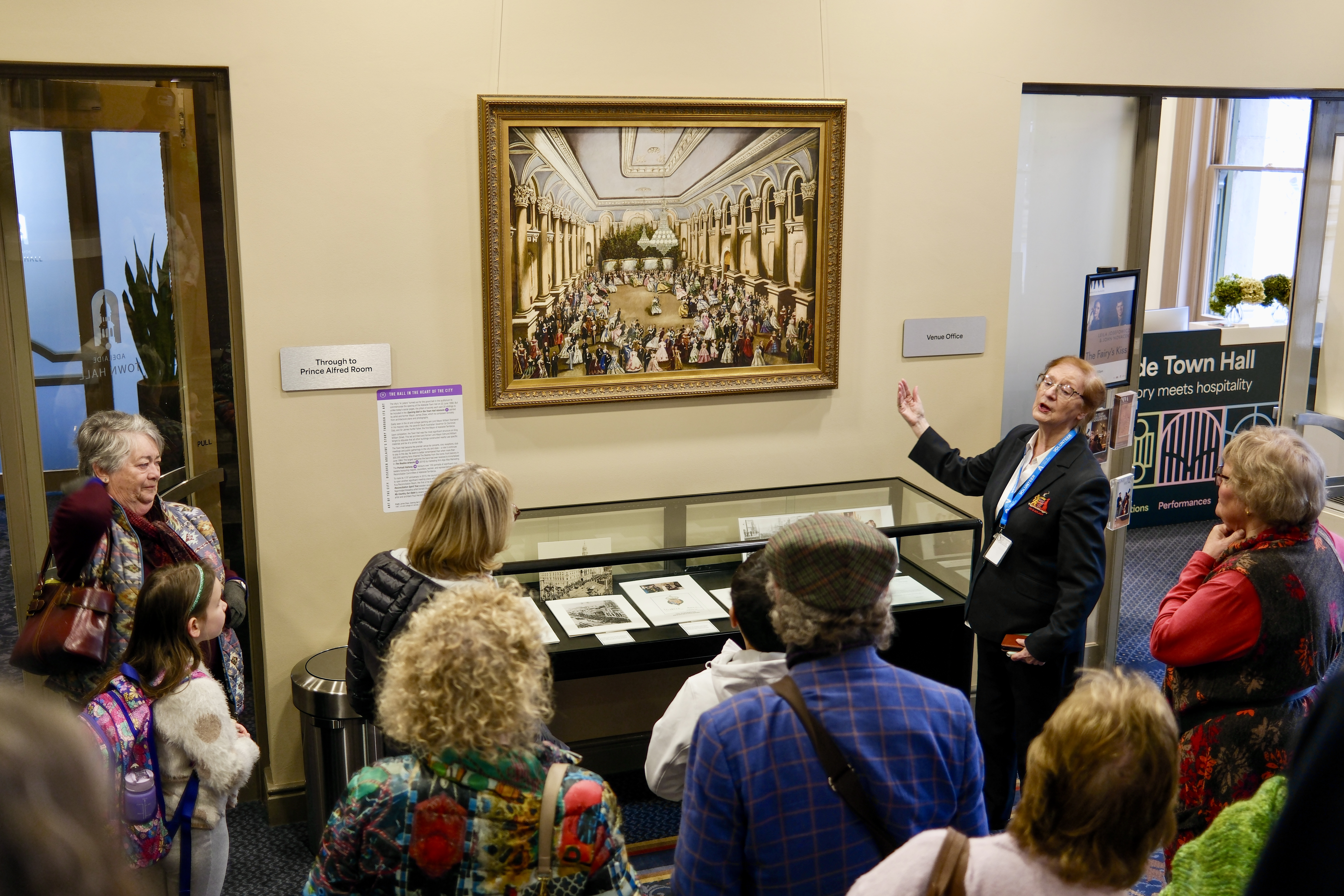
Town hall guide presenting the painting of the opening ball

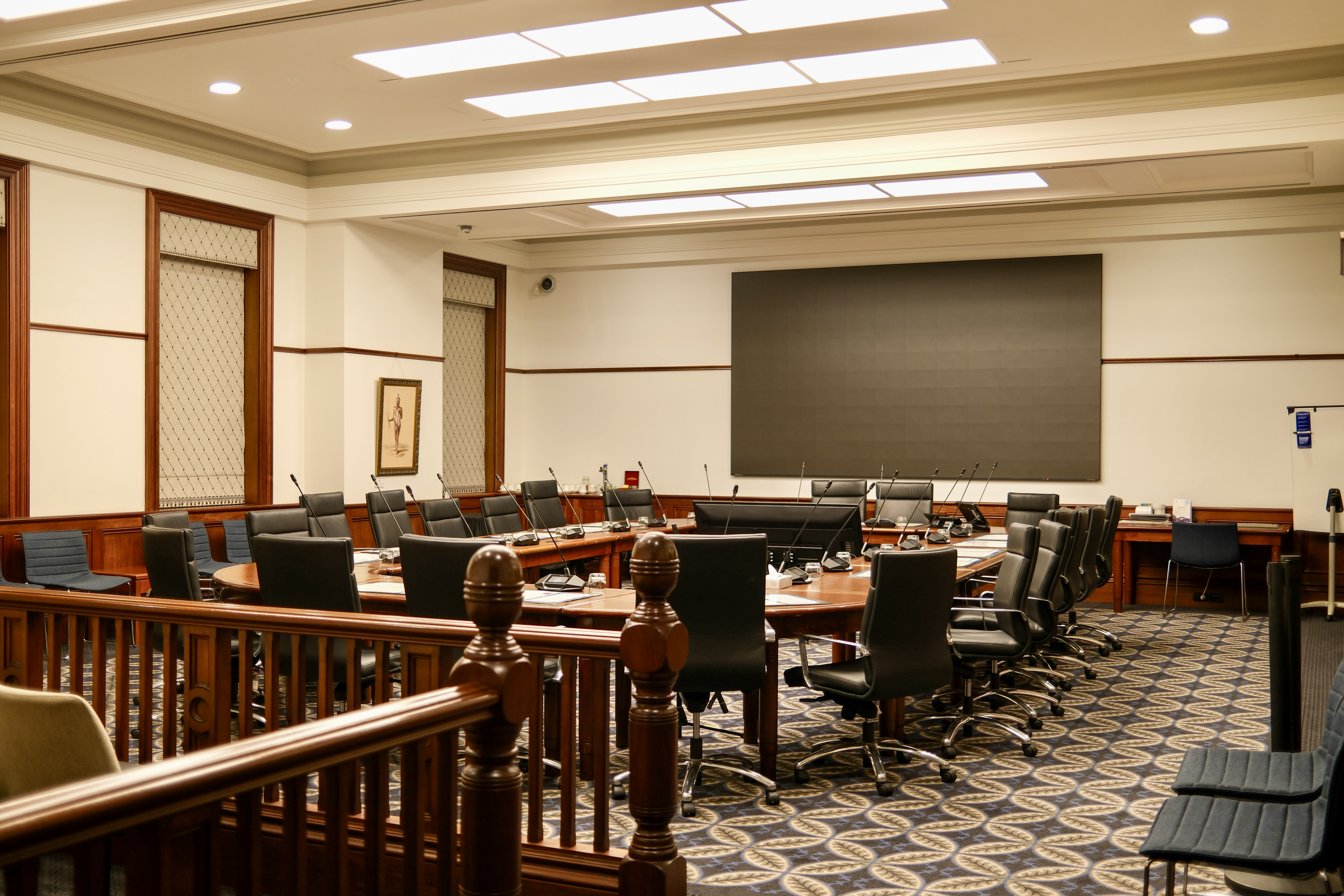
Colonel Light Room inside the town hall

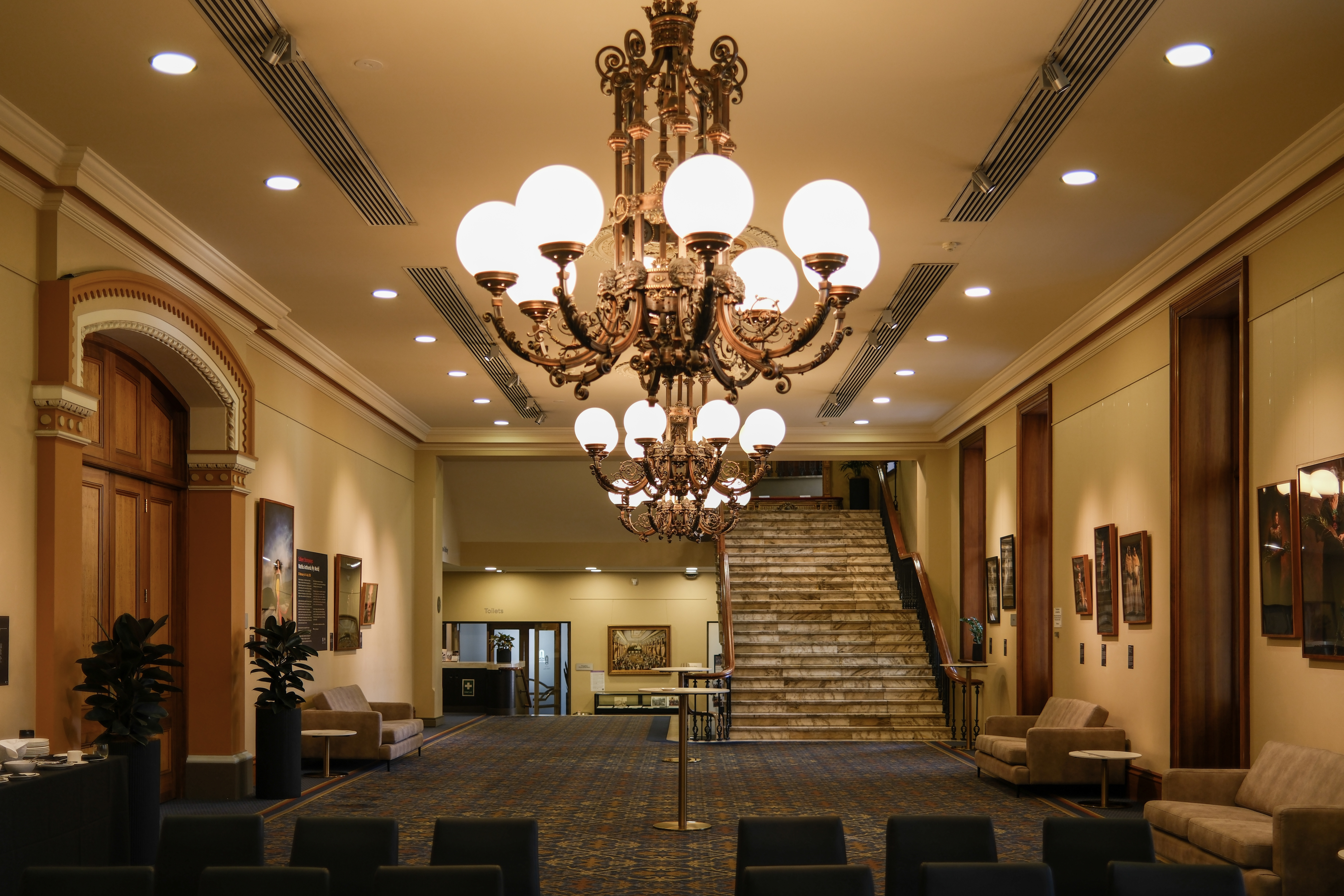
First floor displaying art exhibits mounted on the walls

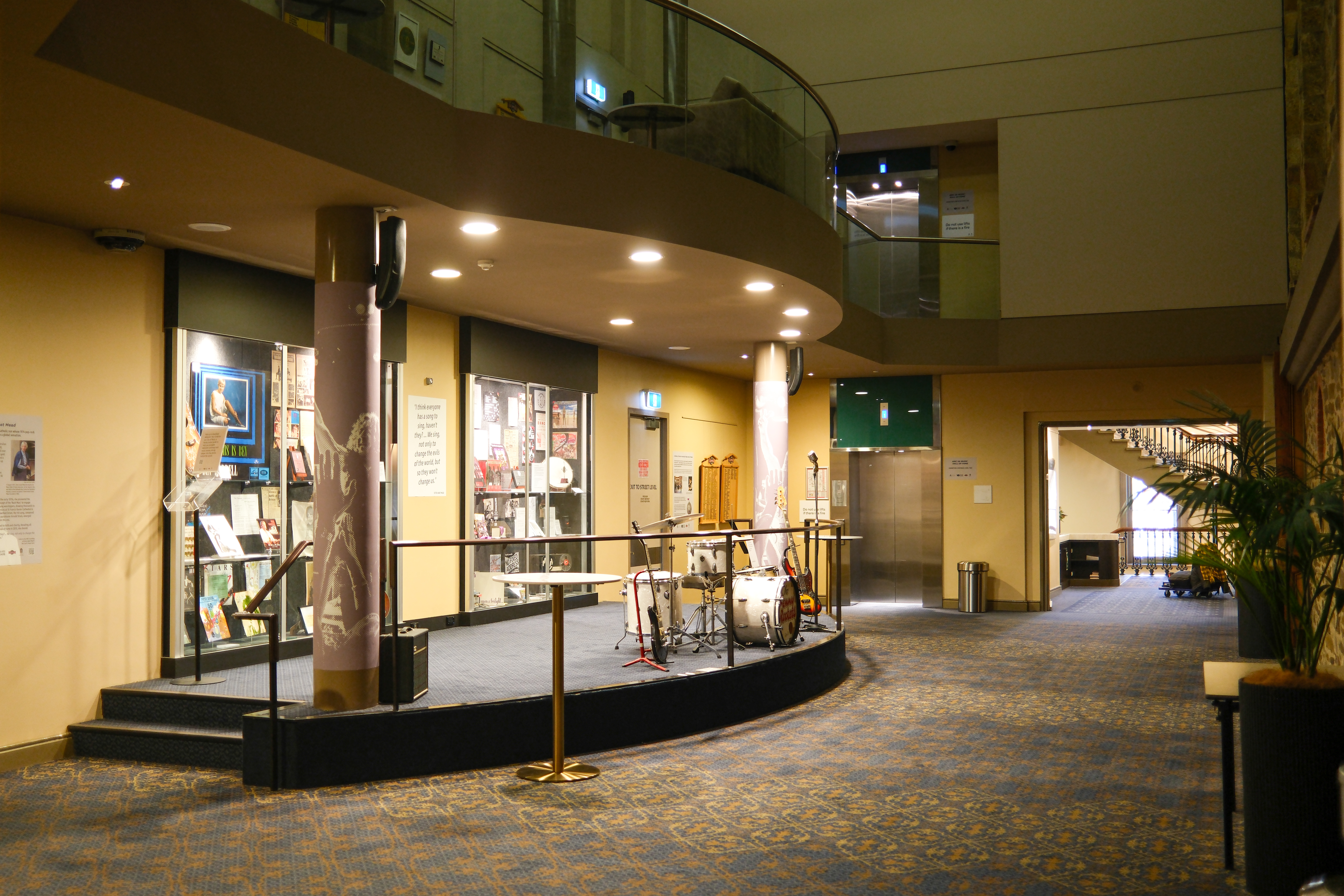
South Australian Music Hall of Fame exhibit inside the town hall
