= South Australian Institute of Architects =

Professional association (1886–1962)

The South Australian Institute of Architects (SAIA) was a professional association for architects in South Australia, founded in 1886. It was preceded by the South Australian Association of Architects, Engineers, and Surveyors and the South Australian Architects' Association. In 1962 it became the South Australian Chapter of the Royal Australian Institute of Architects.

== History ==
In Adelaide, colony of South Australia, the "Architects Association" held a meeting on 9 September 1859, with "Messrs. Hanson (Chairman), Dornwell, Wright, Auld, W. Hanson, "Beevor" (Isidor Beaver), (Note: Misspelt) Garlick, Goyder, E. A. Hamilton, Wadham, Kingston, J. W. Cole, W. E. Cole, and W. G. Harris, Hon. Sec." present. The South Australian Association of Architects, Engineers, and Surveyors was formed by October 1859, probably the same organisation, as many of the same people were involved.

At some point before 1885, there was a "South Australian Architects' Association", in that year having as patron SA architect-in-chief E. J. Woods; as president, Edmund Wright; and vice-presidents, Edward Davies, Isidor Beaver, and W. A. Reid.

The South Australian Institute of Architects (SAIA) was founded by a resolution passed by a group of architects on 20 September 1886. The inaugural dinner of the South Australian Institute of Architects (SAIA) was held at Beach's Cafe on 14 December 1886 "to inaugurate the formation" of the institute, at which "Nearly all the members of the profession in Adelaide were present". Allan Campbell and was president, and Edmund Wright and E.J. Woods vice-presidents. Former mayor of Adelaide and chairman of the Builders' Association William Bundey as well as David Murray, Chief Secretary of South Australia, were also present at the dinner, and it was noted that current mayor Edwin Smith was not able to be present. Architects James Cumming, Daniel Garlick, and Isidor Beaver also attended.

Wright's address referred to the improved status of the profession, and discussion ensued about builders and contractors working with architects and parliamentarians to ensure that the forthcoming Building Act would be well-drafted.

In 1904 Walter Hervey Bagot designed the seal of the SAIA.

David Williams was one of the founding group, and was president from 1911 to 1913. During this time he called on the South Australian Government to hold design competitions for large public buildings, and the SAIA also became an allied member of the Royal Institute of British Architects.

F. Kenneth Milne was president from 1937 to 1939.

== National body ==
The Australian Institute of Architects was established on 6 September 1929, and was granted a royal charter the following year, when it became Royal Australian Institute of Architects The South Australian Institute of Architects joined the national group much later, in July 1962, becoming the "South Australian Chapter".
