= Edmund Wright (architect) =

Australian architect

Mayor of Adelaide
- In office January 1859 – November 1859
- Preceded by: William Sabben
- Succeeded by: Edward Glandfield

Personal details
- Born: Edmund William Wright; 4 April 1824 Fulham, London, England
- Died: 5 August 1888 (aged 64) North Adelaide, South Australia, Australia
- Resting place: North Road Cemetery
- Spouse: Agnes Stuckey (m. 1852; died 1888)
- Children: 4
- Occupation: Architect; engineer; businessman

Edmund William Wright (4 April 1824 – 5 August 1888) was a London-born architect in the colony of South Australia. He was mayor of Adelaide for 10 months in 1859. He designed many civic, commercial, ecclesiastical, and residential buildings in Adelaide city centre and its suburbs, in styles influenced by French and Italian Renaissance, as well as Neoclassical architecture. He collaborated with other notable architects E. J. Woods, Isidor Beaver, and Edward Hamilton in designing some of the most notable buildings.

== Early life and education ==
Edmund William Wright born on 4 April 1824 in Fulham, London. He was the son of Stephen Amand Wright, who was Master of Ordnance at the Tower of London, and Lucy Elizabeth, née Tomkins. Wright spent holidays in France, as there were French relatives, and it is thought that memories of these influenced his later designs.

He trained as architect, surveyor, and engineer, graduating when articled to a Mr Stow, Borough Surveyor of Bermondsey, London. He became clerk of works at Yarmouth, later sailing first to Bermuda to construct an iron lighthouse, and then to Canada, where he worked in construction and engineering. After experiencing poor health, he returned to Bermuda and thence to London.

On 15 May 1849 Wright emigrated with his brother Edward to the colony of South Australia, and although he first advertised his architectural services in South Australia in The South Australian Register in June 1849, he did not work as an architect until over a decade later. The brothers worked as land agents and joined the rush to the Victorian goldfields, but by 1852 he had returned to Adelaide, where he married Agnes Jane Stuckey (née Rippingville).

== Business career ==
Between 1849 and 1860, Wright worked in a number of roles, including as a clerk for the Mt Remarkable Mining Company. He also worked as a surveyor with the Union Land and Building Society and the Alliance Assurance Company, and as City Surveyor for the Corporation of Adelaide, and as an insurance agent for the Imperial Fire Insurance Company. He was appointed to the boards of several mining companies.

== Architect ==
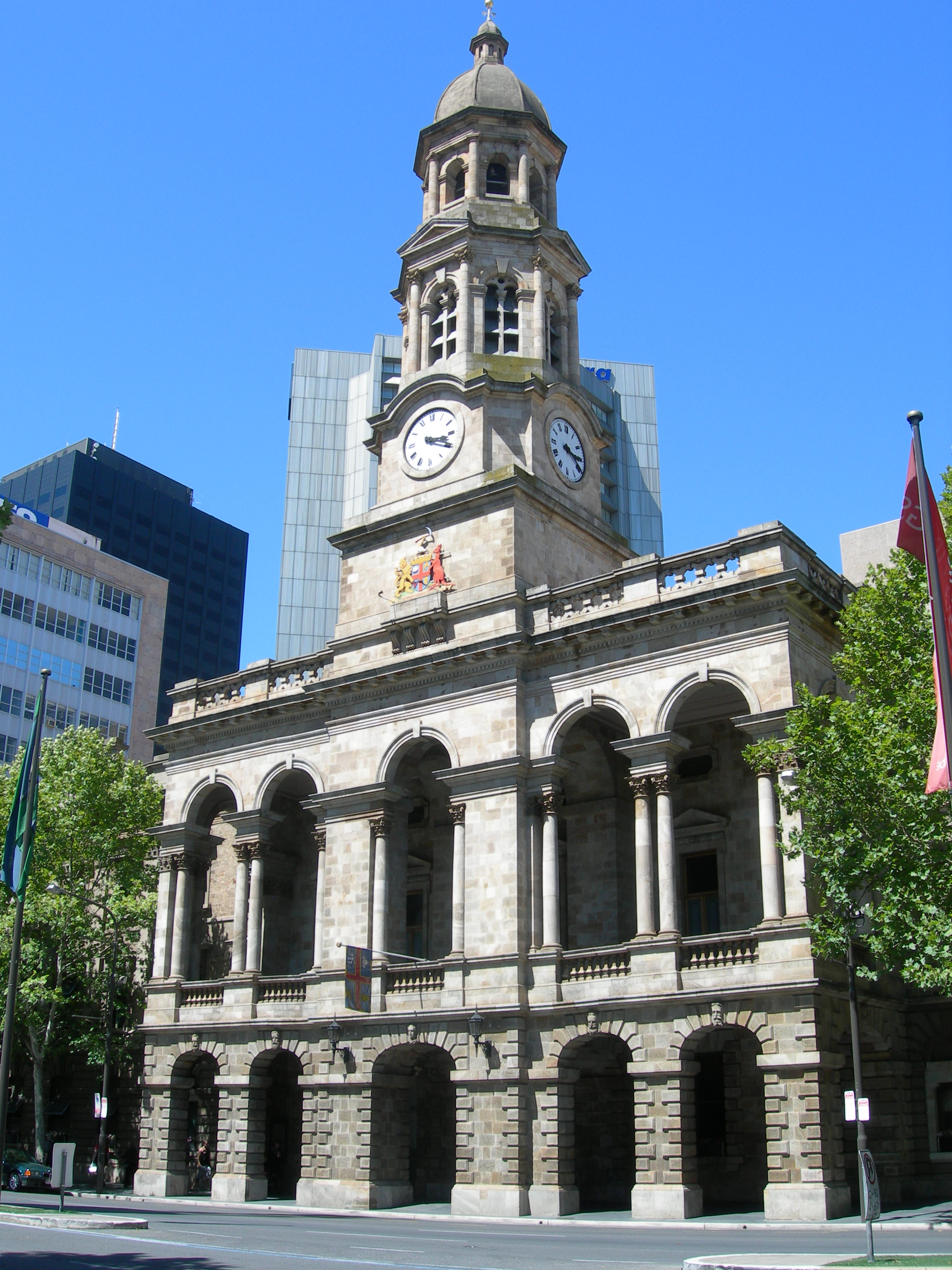
Adelaide Town Hall, designed with E. J. Woods

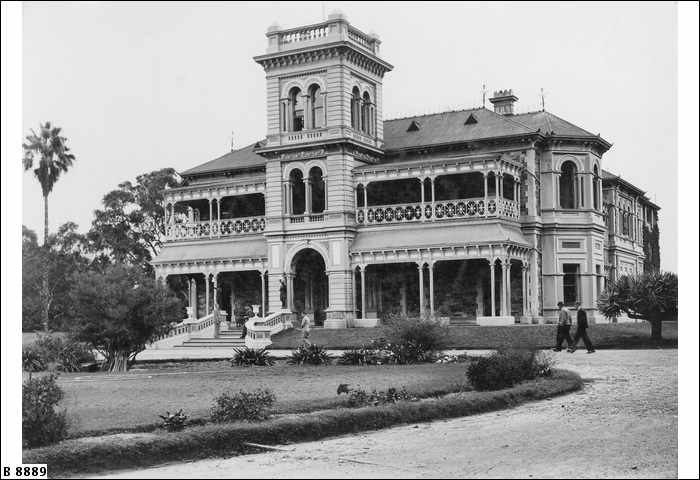
Paringa Hall, now part of Sacred Heart College, in 1933

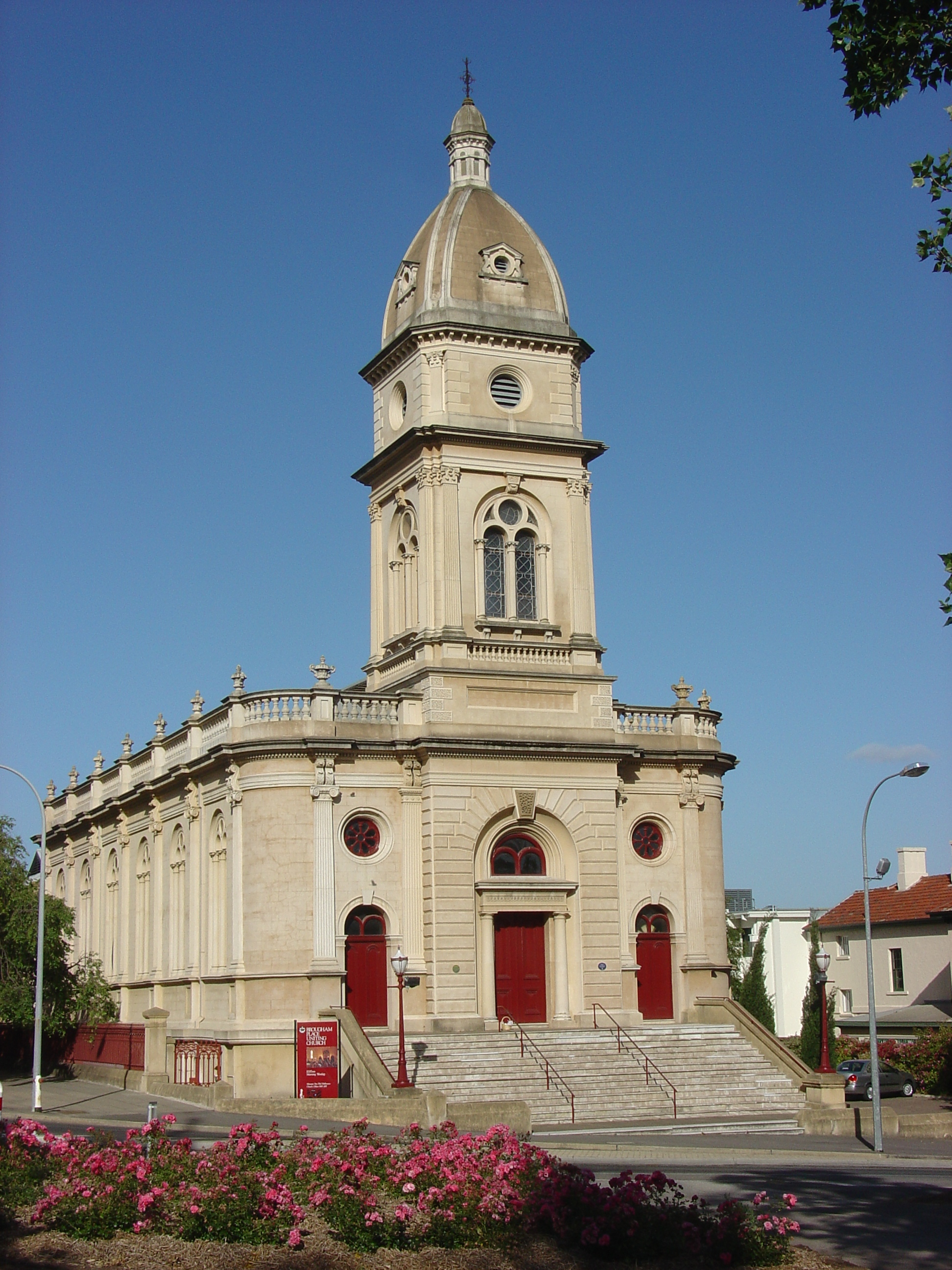
Brougham Place Uniting Church, North Adelaide (1859-1861), designed with Edward Hamilton

=== Style ===
Wright gave talks in which he proposed adopting elements of some Italian styles of architecture, such as flat rather than steeply-pitched roofs, and suggested that large rooms were cooler in hot summers. He preferred the style of "Gothic-Italian" architecture seen in northern Italy over Gothic architecture. His building designs were influenced by French, Italian Renaissance architecture, with his best works showing more Neoclassical elements. His style has been dubbed "Victorian Free Classical" style.

His designs for Parliament House were in Victorian Academic Classical style, while his bank designs were Renaissance style.

=== Practice ===
In June 1851 Wright took over the practice of Adelaide architect Henry Stuckey (1821 – 31 May 1851). In that year, he won a competition to design a bridge over the Torrens River to be known as the City Bridge, but after delaying until 1854, government architect William Bennett Hays and his department designed an iron bridge to be ordered from England.

In 1860, Wright and E. J. Woods formed a partnership. In 1858 Wright had submitted the winning design for a competition for Adelaide Town Hall, but he was mayor at that time, so declined the prize. A second competition was held on 20 January 1863, in which Wright & Woods' plans won.

From 1866 the partnership included E. A. Hamilton in the architectural firm of Wright, Woods & Hamilton. Wright and Woods got on well, but Woods left the partnership in 1869 because Bishop Augustus Short requested that he devote himself to the construction of St Peter's Cathedral at North Adelaide. In 1879 James Henry Reed went into partnership with Wright, forming Wright & Reed Architects. In March 1886 Isidor George Beaver joined the partnership, which was renamed Wright, Reed & Beaver (for only two years, as Wright died in 1888).

Wright was senior partner in his later years.

=== Notable buildings ===
Wright won several architectural competitions to design notable buildings in Adelaide, including the Adelaide Town Hall, Adelaide GPO (General Post Office), and Brougham Place Congregational Church, some in collaboration with Woods or other architects.

The town hall was opened in 1866 after substantial modifications demanded by the councillors, to make it suitable for more purposes. Wright was paid to superintend the work. The post office also had to undergo major alterations to its design before it was built.

The headquarters for the old Bank of South Australia (which became defunct in 1892) was designed by Wright in collaboration with Melbourne-based architect Lloyd Tayler. The building style is influenced by classical and Renaissance architecture, while the richly decorated interiors are in Rococo Revival style. Subsequent to the demise of the Bank of South Australia, the building was occupied by three major banks in succession, before being sold to a commercial developer, who planned to demolish it in 1971. A public campaign that raised A$250,000 saved the building, and it was bought by the Dunstan government and renamed Edmund Wright House. The campaign also led to the passing of the first SA heritage laws in 1978. The banking chamber was used for various types of performances, including the inaugural the Adelaide Chamber Singers' inaugural concert, many recitals, and Adelaide Fringe shows, while the offices were once occupied by the SA Government's Arts Department. The building became vacant around 2014 or 2015, and was sold to a private Sydney-based buyer by the Marshall government in 2019. In 2024, journalist David Washington compared its fate to Chelsea Town Hall in London, which had recently undergone extensive refurbishment, suggesting that the building is "arguably South Australia's most spectacular heritage building".

== Other roles ==
Wright was elected as an alderman on the City of Adelaide Council in July 1857. In January 1859, he became mayor but resigned in November of the same year.

Wright was an inaugural member of the Society of Architects, Engineers, and Surveyors in 1858. In 1859 he read a paper to the society outlining his architectural philosophy for South Australia.

In September 1885, he was elected president of the South Australian Architects' Association. Woods was patron, while Beaver, Edward Davies, and W. A. Reid were elected as vice-presidents.

Wright was elected vice-president of the South Australian Institute of Architects after its foundation in 1886.

== Personal life ==
Wright married Agnes, the widow of Henry Stuckey (c. 1820 – 31 May 1851), on 26 October 1852. She had a daughter, and the couple had a further four children, of whom only three survived to adulthood. Wright bought and extended the cottage formerly rented by Stuckey 26 Palmer Place, North Adelaide (later the site of "the Walkley house", designed prominent Australian architect Robin Boyd in 1955).

== Death and legacy ==
Wright died of bowel obstruction on 5 August 1888 and was buried in North Road Cemetery, Nailsworth.

He is remembered by a commemorative plaque in the Jubilee 150 Walkway along North Terrace in the city.

Sculptor John Dowie dubbed Wright "the Christopher Wren of Adelaide".

Biographer P. A. Howell suggests that Wright does not deserve the reputation that he has been accorded since 1971, suggesting that "most of Wright's partners were gifted professionals who merited a large share of the honour accorded him".

=== Awards ===
The Edmund Wright Heritage Awards were administered by the South Australian Department for Environment and Heritage from 2003 to 2005.

The inaugural Edmund Wright Heritage Award for Heritage Places in 2003 was won by Peter Moeck for the new auditorium of the Anglican St John's Church in Salisbury (originally designed by Daniel Garlick, gutted by fire in 1989), project by Brown Falconer.

In 2004, the Danvers Studio won Edmund Wright Heritage Awards in two categories: Outstanding Contribution, and Adaptive Re-use (Non-Residential). Grieve Gillett Architects won in the Heritage Place (Non Residential) category, for their upgrade of the Torrens Parade Ground building.

In 2005, Chapman Herbert Architects won the award in two categories: Heritage Places (Non-Residential) and Minister's Award for Outstanding Contribution, for their "City Hall & Cave Garden II Redevelopment" in Mt Gambier. In the same year, Artlab Australia commendation in the Heritage Trades and Products category for their restoration of a painted ceiling in the historic Ayers House. Kevin & Mardi Verrion won the Heritage Homes category, for Brock House – Conservation, and David Johnson for his reconstruction of Scotch College front gates.

== List of buildings designed by Wright ==
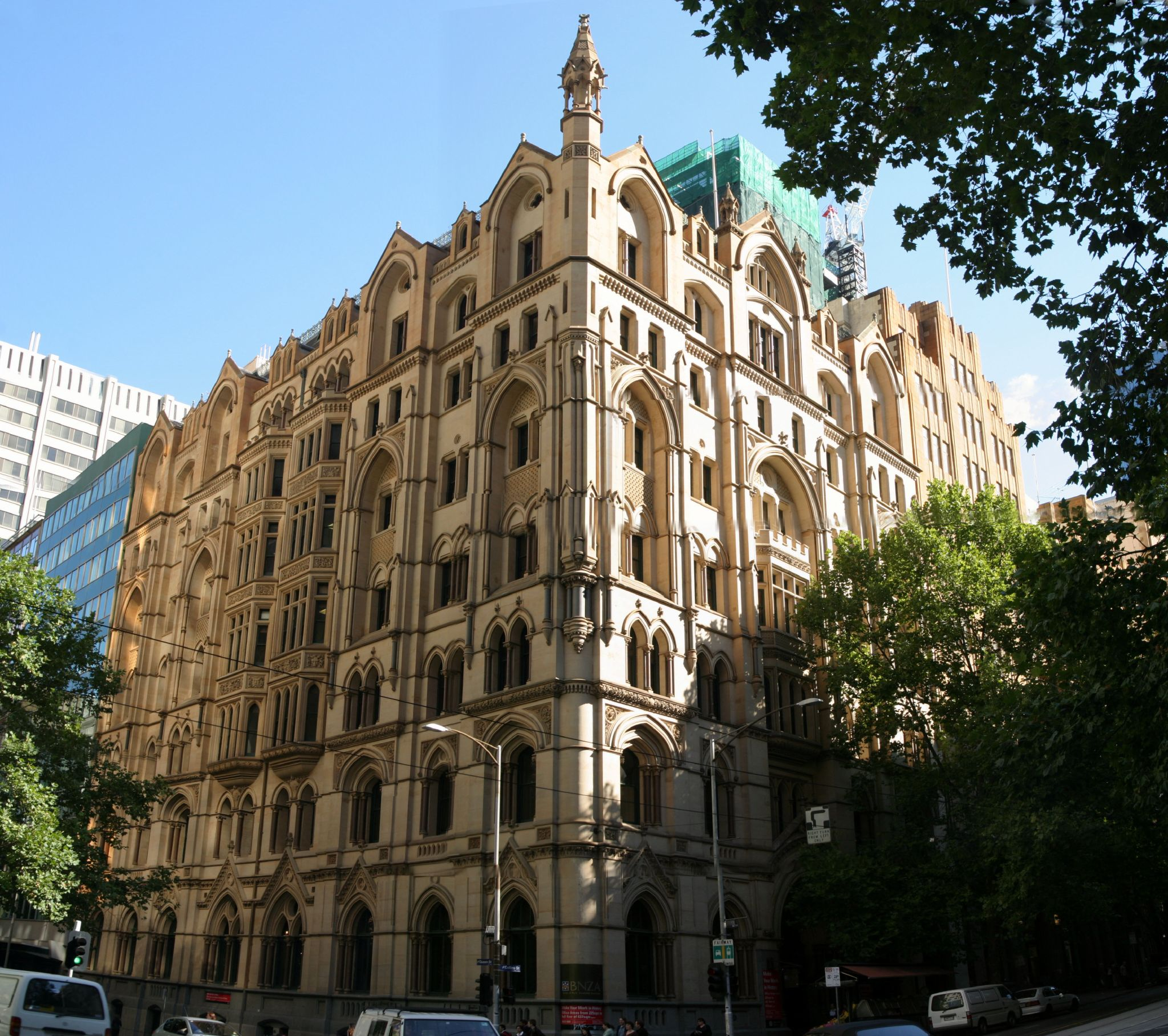
National Mutual Life building (1893), designed with Isidor Beaver

Wright designed (either alone or in partnership) the following buildings:

=== Government and commercial ===
- Bank of South Australia, Commercial Rd, Port Adelaide (1859)
- Adelaide Town Hall (competition, 1863; built 1863-66; inaugurated 20 June 1866)
- National Chambers for the National Bank of Australasia, 22-26 King William Street (1864-5; with Woods)
- Adelaide GPO (General Post Office) building, King William Street, Adelaide (competition, March 1866; in collaboration with Edward Hamilton; 1867–1872)
- Bank of South Australia headquarters, in collaboration with (and perhaps principally designed by) Melbourne-based architect Lloyd Tayler; now "Edmund Wright House", 59 King William Street (1878)
- Royal Exchange, King William Street, for John Robb
- Bank of Adelaide, 81-87 King William Street (corner of Currie Street), Adelaide (competition; 1878–1880; with Woods; south-west corner only)
- West wing of Parliament House, North Terrace, Adelaide (competition July 1874, with Lloyd Tayler; only built from 1883, supervised by Woods, and complete in 1939)
- Exchange Building, Pirie Street for George Dutton Green
- National Mutual Life building (later Goode House and Bank of New Zealand), 389-399 Collins Street, Melbourne (1887-1893), with Beaver and Reed; Beaver was supervising architect in Melbourne

=== Religious ===
- Brougham Place Congregational Church, North Adelaide (competition 1859, in collaboration with Edward Hamilton; built 1861, with construction supervised by Wright & Woods) now Brougham Place Uniting Church
- Methodist Meeting Hall, off Pirie Street, Adelaide (1863)
- St Rose of Lima Catholic Church, Kapunda (1866), rebuilt in 1938 to designs by Herbert Jory
- St. Laurence's Church and Priory, Buxton Street, North Adelaide (1867–1868)
- Jewish Synagogue, off Rundle Street East (1871)

=== Residential ===
- "Belmont", Brougham Place, North Adelaide (1858)
- "Linden", Burnside
- "Paringa Hall" for the Cudmore family, Brighton Road, Somerton Park, now part of Sacred Heart College
- "Athelney", College Park
- "Princess Royal" homestead at Burra
- "The Olives", Glenelg, for his brother

=== Other ===
- Adelaide Educational Institution schoolhouse, 61–71 Young Street, Parkside

Political offices
Preceded by William Sabben	Mayor of the Corporation of Adelaide; 1859	Succeeded by Edward Glandfield
