= General Post Office, Adelaide =

Historic building in South Australia

General Post Office
- Viewed from Victoria Square, 2026
- Alternative names: Adelaide GPO

General information
- Type: Post office
- Architectural style: Victorian Free Classical Renaissance Revival
- Location: 141–159 King William Street, Adelaide, South Australia, Australia
- Coordinates: 34°55′33.96″S 138°36′0.66″E
- Current tenants: Adelaide Marriott Hotel
- Year built: 1867–1872
- Opened: 6 May 1872
- Renovated: 2021–2024
- Cost: A£53,258
- Client: Government of South Australia

Height
- Height: 48 metres (157 ft)

Technical details
- Material: Stone and brick
- Grounds: 1 acre (4,000 m^{2})

Design and construction
- Architects: Edmund Wright and Edward Woods
- Other designers: Edward Hamilton and Robert Thomas
- Main contractor: Brown and Thompson

Renovating team
- Architect: Hassell
- Other designers: Baukultur and Woods Bagot

Website
- heritage.adelaidegpo.com.au

Commonwealth Heritage List
- Official name: Adelaide General Post Office
- Type: Listed place
- Criteria: A, D, E, F, G, H
- Designated: 22 June 2004
- Reference no.: 105518

South Australian Heritage Register
- Official name: General Post Office Building
- Designated: 24 July 1980
- Reference no.: 10860

The General Post Office is a former post office and telegraph building at the corner of King William and Franklin streets, overlooking Victoria Square in the Adelaide city centre, South Australia. Designed by Edmund William Wright and Edward John Woods in collaboration with Edward Angus Hamilton and Robert George Thomas, it was built from 1867 to 1872 by Brown and Thompson. The building was officially opened on 6 May 1872 and listed on the Commonwealth Heritage List on 15 July 2004.

Built after an architectural competition conducted from 1865 to 1866, it cost A£53,258, more than the £20,000 construction ceiling price. It was the most expensive building ever erected in South Australia by the colonial government to that point in time. Constructed in the Victorian Free Classical Renaissance Revival style, it uses Glen Osmond stone, Glen Ewin freestone and Bath limestone dressings. Its main features include the clock tower situated at the corners, known as Victoria Tower, and the two-storey postal hall featuring ironwork, encaustic tiles and clerestory lighting. In October 1872, the telegraph office of the building connected internationally using the Overland Telegraph Line and the adjoining submarine cable.

The postal facilities left the building on 11 October 2019 when they moved to the GPO Exchange building, located next to the site, along Franklin Street. The building became part of the development of Adelaide Marriott Hotel valued at A$200 million, which opened on 22 August 2024, with the modern tower having 285 rooms. In March 2025, a project worth $60 million for refurbishment of the building, with the hall of postal service becoming a venue for events and heritage accommodation, was planned.

== Background ==
The official South Australian postal services started operating on 10 April 1837 following the appointment of Thomas Gilbert who was the colonial storekeeper as postmaster. The first post office operated in a rented building near River Torrens just around the present location of Adelaide railway station. At the initial stage letters cost one penny while the receivers picked them up personally.

On 14 December 1838, the post office was relocated to 17 North Terrace in a rented stone building under Postmaster-General Henry Watts. In 1839, delivery of mail in Adelaide started following the enactment of the first Post Office Act in the colony. Robert McCulloch and William Chapman were appointed as the first letter carriers whose scarlet uniform earned them the nickname "Scarlet Runners".

In 1848, the department relocated to premises previously used by Gresham Hotel. The suburban post offices were set up in 1850, while on 23 June 1851 the main post office relocated to a building next to the present General Post Office premises in King William Street. This building housed a government department that was home to the police and the courts. The iron pillar boxes were introduced in North Adelaide and Adelaide in 1861. In February 1855, the office of Superintendent of Telegraphs was created and filled by the appointment of Charles Todd to this role.

== History ==
=== Design and construction (1865–1872) ===
A design competition for a new General Post Office and Telegraph Station was held in August 1865. It had thirteen entrants. Conditions stipulated that the postal and telegraph offices should be separate spaces internally, while externally they must appear as one building within the budget cost of A£20,000.

The design was chosen in April 1866 by Edmund William Wright and Edward John Woods. This design was amended with the help of Edward Angus Hamilton and Robert George Thomas, the designer of the second design. Wright and Woods had approached Hamilton, but the government decided to use its own architects to oversee the building work and offered Wright and Woods £1,300 in compensation. The tower height was then reduced by Thomas.

Construction of the tower was delayed due to of disagreement over the building material. The contractor Thomas Farr refused to accept the selected stone, and construction work was put on hold for six months. Disputes were the basis of a select committee report in October 1867.

Laying of the foundation stone of the General Post Office, 1867

Construction was handed over to Brown and Thompson on 10 July 1867. Later, on 1 November, the Prince Alfred, Duke of Edinburgh laid the foundation stone of Victoria Tower, which was named after Queen Victoria. Thousands of people came to attend this ceremony. A hole in the stone contained a memorial scroll, newspaper cuttings, and seventeen coins. The scroll attributed the design to Wright and Woods, the supervision of construction above the foundations to Thomas, the construction contract to Henry Brown and Henry Thompson, and the clerk of works to Joseph Sherwin.

Townsend Duryea made use of an unfinished tower in 1870 to create a panorama of Adelaide, after making one from Adelaide Town Hall in 1865. The 1870 panorama comprised ten photos, starting with a view to the north from King William Street.

The General Post Office was inaugurated on 6 May 1872. Its construction cost £53,258 9s. 2d., far exceeding the £20,000 initial limit of the competition. This was the most costly building ever built by the South Australian colonial government. The development was related to Postmaster-General Todd, who was prominent in the creation of South Australia's telegraph system.

=== Postal and telecommunications services (1872–1975) ===
On 22 October 1872, the Chief Telegraph Office inside the structure received an overseas telegram via the Overland Telegraph Line and the submarine cable link. This congratulatory telegram from the Lord Mayor of London to Adelaide mayor Adolph Bartels took only about seven hours to arrive in Adelaide. The linking shortened overseas telegraphic communications from months to hours, and also made Adelaide a major hub for the dissemination of overseas news.

In September 1875, Woods objected to the importance attached to Wright's contribution to the structure, arguing that he had done most of the planning for the competition and produced the first drawings.

General Post Office viewed from Victoria Square, before 1876, showing Victoria Tower without its clock

A telephone exchange was installed inside the building between 1883 and 1884. The importance of Adelaide in overseas mail service improved after the construction of the railway link with Melbourne in 1887.

The construction of a north wing commenced in August 1891 and was completed in eighteen months. Constructed by J. J. Leahy at a cost of around £16,469, the wing consisted of forty-one rooms, which included telegraph and administrative offices. A telephone switchboard manufactured in Chicago was installed in 1894.

After federation, the General Post Office provided postal, telephone, and telegraph services under Commonwealth administration. Its postal services entailed the handling of letters, printed matter, parcels and money dispatched within and outside Australia.

General Post Office with Victoria Square in the foreground, c. 1915

A Central Telephone Exchange building was erected to the west of the General Post Office between 1907 and 1908 according to the plan developed by the government architect Charles Edward Owen Smyth. Extensions were designed in 1912, and later additions linked up the exchange to the General Post Office via buildings behind it. The significance of Adelaide in processing overseas mail decreased following the railway link-up with Perth in 1917.

From 1921 to 1926, additional buildings were constructed providing the necessary facilities for handling mail, parcels, telecommunications, and administration. This was done under the design of the Commonwealth Chief Architect, John Smith Murdoch, in collaboration with the South Australian Superintendent of Public Buildings, Alfred Edward Simpson.

Telecommunication activities commenced their relocation from this building in 1975.

=== Heritage listing and relocation (2004–2019) ===
The General Post Office was listed on the Commonwealth Heritage List on 15 July 2004.

Postal operations ended at the historic building on 11 October 2019, following 147 years of operation. The post office has reopened in the adjacent GPO Exchange building on Franklin Street on 14 October, some 130 metres distant. Locations of existing post office boxes, addresses, and access facilities remain the same.

In connection with the move, redevelopment plans envisioned a restaurant and retail hub that would include the historic building, along with a 285-room hotel tower, which was originally planned to be operated by the Westin brand.

=== Hotel redevelopment (2021–present) ===
Construction of the Adelaide Marriott Hotel began in March 2021. Developer Greaton appointed BESIX Watpac as the construction contractor. An official groundbreaking ceremony for the $200 million project was held on 27 April 2021, attended by Premier Steven Marshall and Greaton managing director.

BESIX Watpac announced the project's topping out on 10 October 2023, following installation of the final structural element. The ceremony included a smoking ceremony conducted by Kuma Kaaru.

Adelaide Marriott Hotel was launched on 22 August 2024. It utilised the space previously occupied by the General Post Office. Its A$200 million development included the base building architecture by Hassell that encompassed the new tower extension and the interior design work by Woods Bagot, done by Adelaide architects from Baukultur.

The hotel's interpretation of the building's history was developed with assistance from historian Richard Venus, stamp collectors and members of the Morse code society. Historic photographs were sourced from the State Library of South Australia and collector Martin Walker. Three generations of Todd's family were among the hotel's first visitors.

In March 2025, further plans were announced for a $60 million restoration of the former postal hall and the creation of additional heritage accommodation. Adelaide Marriott general manager said the owners had committed to restoring the remaining General Post Office interiors, including the postal hall, with the work expected to take approximately three years.

== Description and features ==
Main entrance to the General Post Office in 2016, featuring rusticated stonework, a semicircular arch, decorative ironwork and a carved keystone mask.

The site selected for the competition was to be 212 by 212 feet (65 by 65 m) square, with the main façade on the east side. A sketch of an unexecuted main elevation is preserved in the State Library of South Australia, listed under the item number D 6598 (Misc). The building was constructed using Brown and Thompson contractors of stonework and brickwork, with masonry load-bearing walls, timber floors and roof framing, and iron columns, beams and girders. The building features exterior walls made from Glen Osmond stone, Glen Ewin freestone and Bath limestone.

The building is categorised as "Victorian Free Classical Renaissance Revival" with some Italian Mannerist and Baroque influences in the Commonwealth heritage assessment. The principal facades of the building have rusticated stonework, recessed arches, classical columns, projecting pavilions, and balustraded parapet. The building, in its description in January 1872, was referred to as Anglo-Italian, having Doric columns with semicircular-headed windows at the ground level and Ionic columns with square-headed windows at the upper level. There are cornices separating the floors and a bigger cornice and stone balustrade at the top.

The entrances of the building have coffered arch ceilings and Mintaro slate steps. The hall of postal use is on two levels. It had Minton encaustic floor tiles, a half-domed ceiling, clerestory lighting, and a gallery resting on decorative cast iron brackets and trusses. Offices for money order service, ship letters, inland mail, sale of stamps, delivery of parcels, private boxes, and reception of telegrams surrounded the hall. The telegraph room was upstairs. This layout was one of the earlier examples of the design of a post office around an internal public hall.

=== Extensions and alterations ===
The buildings formerly used by the police department in the rear of the General Post Office building were modified for postal use in 1884, including an extra floor and the addition of an arcade.

The north wing on King William Street was built between 1891 and 1893 for use by the telegraph department. The walls of this structure were constructed from red brick and were clad with Murray Bridge freestone to match the original structure, but the stones had a slightly different colour.

A separate telephone exchange building was constructed in 1907 and again enlarged in 1914.

Changes made between 1921 and 1926 included a six-storey addition to the north-west corner, internal changes, and a light well to distinguish the existing building from the newly added accommodation. The plans formulated in 1936 included adding more private letterboxes, more money-order service, more registered-mail counters, and viewing galleries above the mail handling areas.

Subsequent changes made include office refurbishments in the 1970s, private letterbox installation from 1972 to 1973, retail post-shop fit-out in the 1990s and 2000 refurbishment of the basement of the 1921 wing.

=== Victoria Tower and clock ===
Victoria Tower at the General Post Office, 14 April 1926

A description from November 1867 referred to a square Italian tower design with a height of about 150 feet above street level. Its upper portions would have a rusticated clock chamber, bell chamber adorned with Corinthian pilasters and a dome roof. There would also be an eastern niche 25 feet high above the ground level for a statue of Queen Victoria.

The ceremonial stone was made of Macclesfield marble with a size of 6 feet 8 inches in length, 2 feet 3 inches in width and 1 foot 10 inches in depth, weighing around 2¼ tons. Its carving included Queen Victoria's initials, a crown, an anchor and inscription to the Duke of Edinburgh.

Victoria Tower measures roughly 158 feet or 179 feet 6 inches with flagstaff. The architectural features of Victoria Tower include pilasters, scroll consoles and a flared four-sided cupola roof. Together with the Adelaide Town Hall tower facing it, Victoria Tower serves as a gateway to Victoria Square.

The clock is the product of Joyce & Son from Whitchurch, Shropshire, designed according to the plans provided by Postmaster-General Todd, which later underwent further modifications under the guidance of Edmund Beckett. Its four white opal-glass faces were illuminated at night. Bells cast by John Taylor & Co of Loughborough include an hour bell and four quarter bells.

According to one version, the clock was officially inaugurated on 13 December 1875, while others say that the clock installation took place or the tower was completed in 1876. The weight of the heaviest bell reached around 2½ tons, and the scaffolding was needed to carry them through the bell-chamber windows.

=== Hotel conversion and postal hall restoration ===
General Post Office and the Marriott Hotel tower, 24 February 2025

The hotel development project included the existing historical structure of the General Post Office as well as a contemporary tower of 285 guest rooms and suites. Among amenities were provided a club lounge, restaurants and bar outlets, swimming pool, gymnasium and function rooms.

In the process of the development, the historic building retained its original windows and architectural elements and was reinforced in order to provide resistance against earthquakes. The expansion joints between the two structures were marked with brass strips.

The construction required 7,500 cubic metres (260,000 cu ft) of concrete, 1,160 tonnes of reinforcing steel, 620 tonnes of structural steel for the tower and 137 tonnes of structural steel for the heritage building. 1,092 individual pieces of scalloping were employed for the façade design.

Earth tones, burgundy and green colour schemes have been chosen to reflect the changing seasons and viticulture of South Australia. Grid patterns, which reflect Adelaide's streetscape, as well as stone finishes and lighting, are used throughout the building. The double-height hotel lobby features hanging art pieces, a wooden concierge pod and flexible social areas.

These include the Penny Blue Restaurant, which is able to accommodate 126 guests, and the Exchange Lane Café Bar, which is able to seat 88. The naming of the suites and other facilities, as well as the hotel artworks, are inspired by the General Post Office, Victoria Tower, Todd and the Overland Telegraph Line.

Historical interpretation is provided through the exhibition of forty-four photographs showing the links between the building and transport, along with people linked to this building. 'Tempus Edax Rerum' is an artwork made up of copper tubing which makes reference to both the Overland Telegraph Line and the pneumatic tubing used for communication between the General Post Office and the stock exchange. Other artworks include the "Embraced Voussoir", which is a 2½ tonne sandstone sculptural piece, images of Todd's weather maps and the portrait commission for the Drawing Room.

Plans announced in March 2025 proposed adapting the former postal hall as an event space for up to 450 guests, retaining its high ceilings, ornamental architraves and half-domed glass roof. The proposal also included ten heritage guestrooms on a mezzanine level, among them a two-bedroom Postmaster-General's apartment.

== Gallery ==
Adelaide General Post Office illuminated at night for Prince Edward's visit, c. 1925

General Post Office (left) and Treasury Building (right), 1933

Foundation stone of the General Post Office, 2023

Eastern façade of the General Post Office in 2026

General Post Office (left), viewed from Victoria Square, 2026

General Post Office, viewed from the balcony of Adelaide Town Hall, 2026
