= Edward Glandfield =

Australian politician

Edward Bootle Wilbraham Glandfield (c. 1823 – 13 January 1880) was Mayor of Adelaide from 1859 to 1862.

Glandfield arrived in South Australia in August 1848 aboard Gratitude. In 1854 he was elected Alderman to the Adelaide Council, and mayor in 1859, in which position he served until April 1862, when reverses in his business fortunes forced him to resign.

He died as a result of an infected foot, occasioned by an injury from a nail in his boot. His remains were buried at the West Terrace Cemetery.

== Personal ==
On 14 September 1848 he married Elizabeth Ann Hawkes (c. 1829 – 19 August 1923), who arrived in South Australia with her parents Robert and Sarah Hawkes who were also passengers aboard Gratitude a month earlier. They had no children and lived for much of their lives in Shannon street, Glenelg.

Political offices
Preceded by Edmund Wright	Mayor of the Corporation of Adelaide; 1859–1862	Succeeded by Thomas English
