= Herbert Jory =

South Australian architect (1888-1966)

Harrold Herbert Jory (20 March 1888 – 16 May 1966) FRIBA, known as Herbert Jory, was a South Australian architect. He was a partner in the leading firm of Woods, Bagot & Jory from 1913, which became Woods, Bagot, Jory & Laybourne Smith from 1915 to 1930, before establishing his own practice, H. H. Jory. Between 1930 and 1940 he partnered with T.A. McAdam, in Jory and McAdam.

He designed many churches in South Australia and was noted for his use of the Romanesque elements, sometimes combining them with Modernist ones. He was also known for his oversight of the construction of the Salisbury Explosives Factory during World War II.

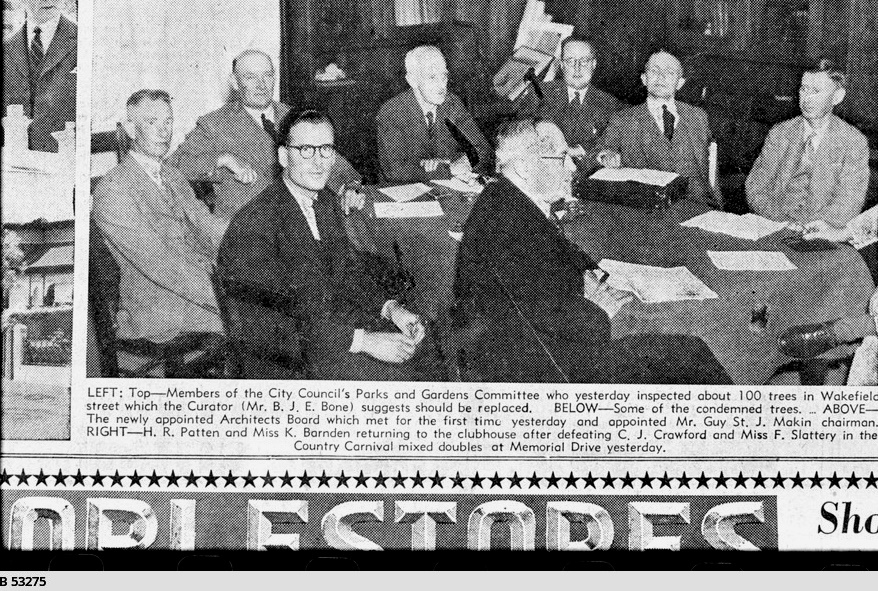
Inaugural Architects Board of South Australia, Feb, 1940 (Note: It is not known which of these men is Jory. SLSA and the photo caption have identified (left to right, from centre foreground) Louis Laybourne Smith; Dean W. Berry; W. Lindsay; and F. Kenneth Milne (out of the picture). The sLSA entry also lists Guy Makin (chairman), Norman Fisher (appointee), Herbert Jory, and Eric McMichael, but it is not clear who is whom.)

== Early life and education ==
Jory was born on 20 March 1888 at Mile End, now an innter western suburb of Adelaide, to parents William and Mary Ann (née Allen) Jory. He went to the Church of England School run by St James’ Church at Mile End.

In 1906, Jory joined the architectural firm Woods & Bagot as an apprentice, around the same time as an Associate and Fellowship Diploma Course in Architecture at the South Australian School of Mines and Industries was established, for which Walter Hervey Bagot was one of the lecturers. He also learnt drawing from Harry P. Gill, who had brought with him from England the South Kensington system of art education, which entailed copying with a great deal of exactitude. Jory, one of the earliest architectural students in the state, was awarded a book prize by the South Australian Institute of Architects in 1907 for his design for "A gardener's lodge".

== Career ==
=== With Woods & Bagot ===
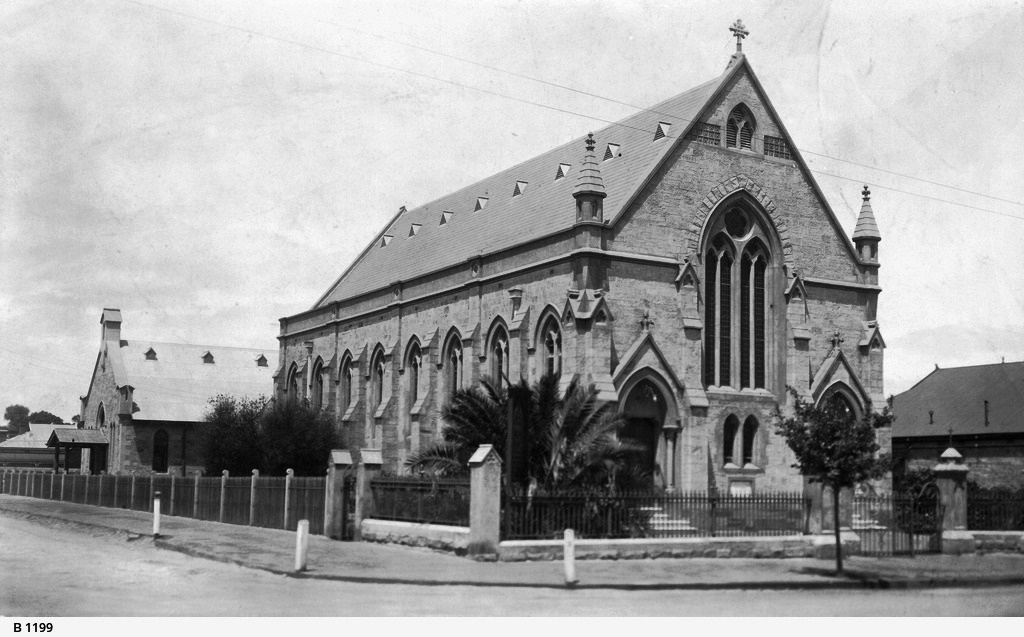
Gartrell Memorial Church in Rose Park, Adelaide

Jory was a partner in the leading firm of Woods, Bagot & Jory from 1913, after 1915 Woods, Bagot, Jory & Laybourne Smith, consisting of Bagot, Edward John Woods and Louis Laybourne-Smith, until 30 September 1930, before establishing his own practice. During this time he designed the Gartrell Memorial Church in the inner-eastern Adelaide suburb of Rose Park (2014–2015), which is now state-heritage-listed.

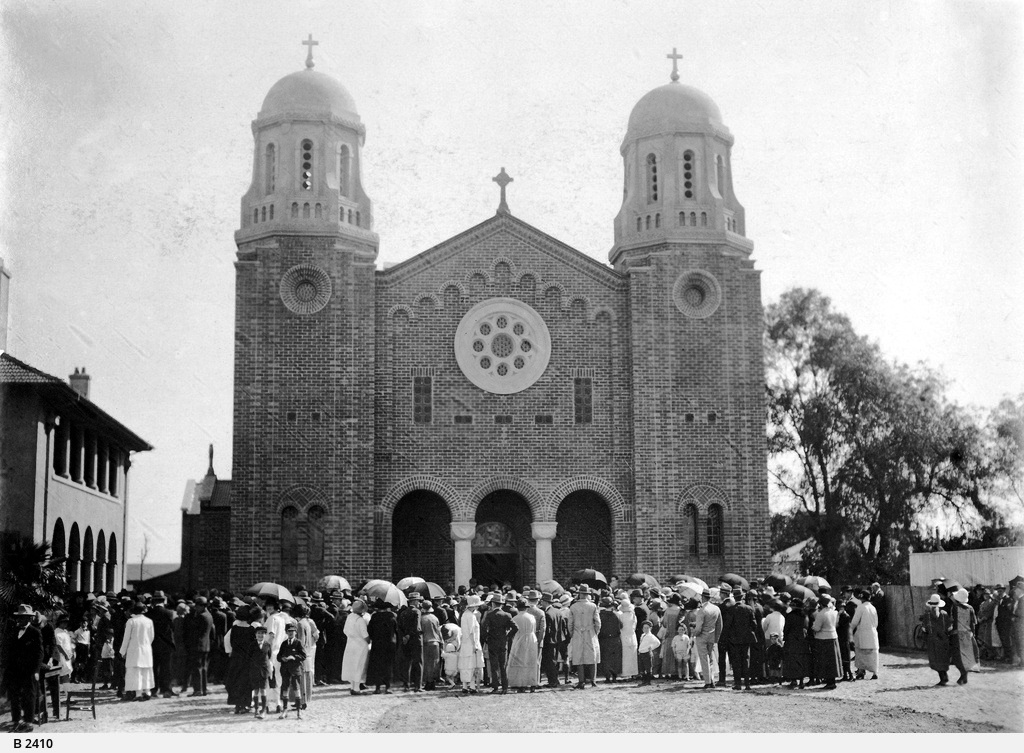
St Saviours, Hindmarsh, at its opening in 1924

Also while in the joint practice, Jory designed the pulpit for the St Francis Xavier's Cathedral (1922) which is regarded as an important example of church furniture. It was erected as a memorial to Roman Catholic soldiers who had died in World War I and was dedicated on 8 March 1931, by the Catholic Archbishop of Adelaide, R. W. Spence. Its intricate and detailed decoration was carved out of Australian blackwood.

Woods, Bagot, Jory & Laybourne Smith were regarded as the dominant designers of Catholic Romanesque in South Australia, with Jory being the major designer in this style. He was the supervising architect for St Saviour's, in the inner-western suburb of Hindmarsh, in 1924, which in 1950 was renamed the Sacred Heart Catholic Church. Jory also designed St Joan of Arc Catholic Church at Victor Harbor in 1920–21, and St Joseph's Catholic Church at Penola (1924), to which a later large extension was added.

=== H. H. Jory ===
After setting up his own practice in 1930, known as H. H. Jory, he designed many buildings for the Roman Catholic church around Adelaide suburbs and in regional South Australia. He was responsible for designing the state-heritage-listed Fennescey House in Gothic Revival style in 1940 at 31-33 Wakefield Street, which now houses the Adelaide Holocaust Museum.

Jory designed several churches in the Romanesque Revival (also known as Lombardic) style. Jory took Stanley Pointer into his practice in 1935, as economic conditions slowly improved after the Great Depression, and they co-designed several churches. In several of his church designs, he combined this traditional style with elements of Modernism, including Our Lady of the Rosary at Prospect, which he co-designed with Pointer and for which Jory designed the high altar, 1936-37 The St Rose of Lima Catholic Church at Kapunda (1938), designed by Jory alone, has been described as "perhaps Jory's Romanesque masterpiece". The Sydney-based magazine Builder commented that "the long narrow window openings, infilled with cast cement grilles, the design of which has an Eastern flavour, are an interesting innovation". Another church in this group (combining Modernism with Romanesque) is St Monica's Catholic Church at Walkerville (1952–1953).

Jory and Pointer co-designed St Canice's Catholic Church in Snowtown (1935–1936) and the St Thomas Aquinas Catholic Church in Naracoorte (1937), the latter in a more Norman Romanesque style.

=== World War II effort ===
As part of Australia's war effort during World War Two, Jory was engaged by the Commonwealth Government's Department of Munitions to oversee the construction of the Salisbury Explosives Factory from November 1941, which was built to ensure supplies of components to the Small Arms Ammunition Factories. At its peak, 3000 labourers and tradesmen were employed seven days a week, and the project was completed within a year. This was a remarkable effort, largely due to Jory's diligence, and it took its toll on Jory's health.

=== Post-war ===
From 1940 until 1953, Jory partnered with T.A. McAdam, with the practice named Jory and McAdam.

== Professional associations and other roles ==
Jory became a Fellow of the South Australian Institute of Architects in 1920, in 1930 becoming a councillor before being elected president in September 1941. Ill-health forced him to step down, but he took on the role of Treasurer until June 1954.

He was also a Fellow of the Royal Institute of British Architects.

=== Architects Board of South Australia ===
The Architects Board of South Australia was established in 1940 in order to allow registration of architects under the Architects Act 1939. Three men were appointed by the Governor of South Australia: Guy St John Makin as inaugural chairman, Leonard Ewens as registrar, and Norman Fisher. Jory was one of six architects elected by their peers to this board; others may have included W. Lindsay (?); Dean Berry, Jack Cheesman, Louis Laybourne Smith, Frank Kenneth Milne and E. H. McMichael.

== Later life and death ==
Jory died on 16 May 1966 at his residence named "Unley Park" in Joslin, and obituaries were published by the South Australian Institute of Architects and The Advertiser. He was buried in the North Road Cemetery in Nailsworth.

He was survived by his wife and two daughters.
