= William Sabben =

Australian politician

William Thompson Sabben (14 January 1813 – 3 May 1890) was Adelaide's first Town Clerk and was Mayor from December 1858 to January 1859, his term being cut short when he was indicted on charges of forgery and uttering, found guilty, and sentenced to six years with hard labour.

== History ==
Sabben was a resident of Portsmouth, England, and emigrated to Victoria, thence to South Australia, where on 24 March 1849 he was admitted as a barrister of the Supreme Court.

He was in July 1852 appointed the City of Adelaide's first Town Clerk, a position which he offered to fill, in the first instance, gratis. He resigned on 4 February 1856, but continued acting in the position until W. A. Hughes was appointed at the end of that month. In December 1856 he was elected councillor for the Hindmarsh ward, of the Council. In December 1858, at the end of John Lazar's year in the position, Sabben was elected mayor by his fellow councillors, narrowly defeating Lazar. Sabben relinquished the position when he was indicted on charges of forgery and uttering; Bail was refused.

Sabben was convicted in March 1859 of having forged a document in the name of one Thomas Braddon, a landholder of Angaston and Mount Remarkable, used as collateral to obtain a bank loan during a time of recession. The evidence against him was produced by Alderman Lazar. He was sentenced to six years' hard labour, which was generally considered over-severe, commencing February 1859 and was released in November 1861.

Following Sabben’s removal from office, F. W. Thomas was elected unopposed to the ward of Hindmarsh. The mayoral position went to Alderman Wright on the casting vote of the chairman, Alderman Elliot. Sabben moved to Kapunda, South Australia, where he worked as a clerk for H. C. Palmer, who had a legal practice there. He later went into business on his own, as a notary public in that town. He was closely associated with the (Anglican) Christ Church, and served as Minister's Warden to the incumbent Rev. J. M. Donaldson. Sabben withdrew from this service in April 1874, without giving any reason. Shortly afterwards Rev. Donaldson took Sabben to court, suing him and Mrs. Sabben £100 on the basis of slanderous statements they had made regarding his relationship with a female servant. Sabben's lawyer (James Boucaut) persuaded him to tender an apology, and reluctantly Sabben did so, paying costs and an out-of-court settlement of £25, which might have been the end of the matter, but Donaldson and his lawyers Samuel Way then proceeded to sue Sabben on behalf of the servant for another £100, but she signed a declaration that she did not want to pursue the matter, and had no desire for such a sum of money.

The Rev. Donaldson was later defrocked when it transpired that around 1880 he and his first wife, whom he married in Victoria as Catherine Brock on 17 November 1876, separated, and on 2 January 1888 in England bigamously married Jean Morton. He declared himself insolvent and moved to Steveston, British Columbia, where in 1890 he founded St. Anne's Anglican Church.

After the death of his wife, Sabben returned to Kapunda, where he was hospitalised for some time. He then moved to Queen's Own Town (now Finniss, South Australia), where his daughter Marian Cowling lived, and died at their home, the schoolhouse.

== Family ==
Sabben married Marianne Ballard (c. 1829 – 29 December 1883); their children were:

- Marian Augusta Sabben (22 Aug 1857–29 Jul 1891) married Thomas Cowling (1857 – 25 April 1928), teacher and son of the noted mine captain, in 1888
- Charles Vivian Sabben (26 Jun 1863, Adelaide–18 Jul 1930, Murray Bridge) married (Johanna) Maria Schoenberg in 1893
- Frederick Desborough Sabben (21 Sep 1864, Riverton Road, Kapunda–3 Jun 1866, Kapunda)

Political offices
Preceded by John Lazar	Mayor of the Corporation of Adelaide; 1858–1859	Succeeded by Edmund Wright
