= Edward Hamilton (Australian politician) =

Australian politician

Treasurer of South Australia
- In office 12 May 1870 – 30 May 1870
- Preceded by: Henry Hughes
- Succeeded by: John Hart

Member of the South Australian House of Assembly for Light
- In office 5 April 1870 – 28 July 1871
- Preceded by: John Hart
- Succeeded by: James White

Colonial Architect and Supervisor of Works of South Australia
- In office July 1856 – 1860
- Succeeded by: George Soward

Personal details
- Born: Edward Angus Hamilton; 27 February 1831
- Spouse: Ellen Seymour (m. 1856)
- Occupation: Architect; politician

Edward Angus Hamilton (27 February 1831 – after July 1871) was an architect and politician in colonial South Australia.

== Early life and education ==
Edward Angus Hamilton was born on born 27 February 1831, the son of George Ernest Hamilton, a civil engineer.

He arrived in the colony of South Australia on 5 December 1849.

== Career ==
=== Architecture ===
In April 1852 Hamilton began government service at the Assay Office, where remained until June 1853. Hamilton was then appointed Assistant to the Colonial Architect of South Australia, William Bennett Hays. By January 1854 he had been appointed Assistant Architect in the Colonial Architect's Office. When Hays left for England towards the end of 1854, Hamilton was placed in charge. On 10 July 1856 Hamilton was appointed Colonial Architect and Supervisor of Works with a salary of £450 per annum and a £112 gratuity.

Hamilton resigned as Colonial Architect around August 1860.

Hamilton and his father were involved in constructing the Kadina to Wallaroo railway, completed in 1866. Their partnership was dissolved later in 1866 when George was appointed to the Strathalbyn and Middleton Railway.

In 1866 Hamilton joined the architectural firm of Wright & Woods (with Edmund Wright and E. J. Woods), which he left in 1868 to become second-in-charge of the Colonial Architect's Department.

=== Politics ===
Hamilton was elected a member of the South Australian House of Assembly for the District of Light on 5 April 1870, served as Treasurer of South Australia from 12 May 1870 to 30 May 1870 and resigned a year later, unmourned, on 28 July 1871.

== Works ==
Hamilton was responsible for designing the Institute Building for the South Australian Institute on North Terrace, Adelaide, which was designed in 1858 in Victorian Renaissance style, completed in July 1860, and opened on 29 January 1861.

He designed the present (Anglican) St George's Church in Gawler in Early English style. The foundation stone was laid on 6 January 1858 but the building was not consecrated until 23 April 1895 (by Bishop Kennion), initially due to the church trustees not accepting the Model Trust Deed.

He collaborated with Edmund Wright on the design of two prominent Adelaide buildings:

- Brougham Place Congregational Church, North Adelaide (competition 1859; built 1861; now Brougham Place Uniting Church)
- Adelaide GPO (General Post Office) building, King William Street, Adelaide (competition, March 1866; built 1867–1872)

== Personal life ==
Hamilton married Ellen Seymour in 1856.

It is thought that he left the colony sometime after 1871, for South America or California.
