= William Bundey (mayor) =

Australian politician (1826–1889)

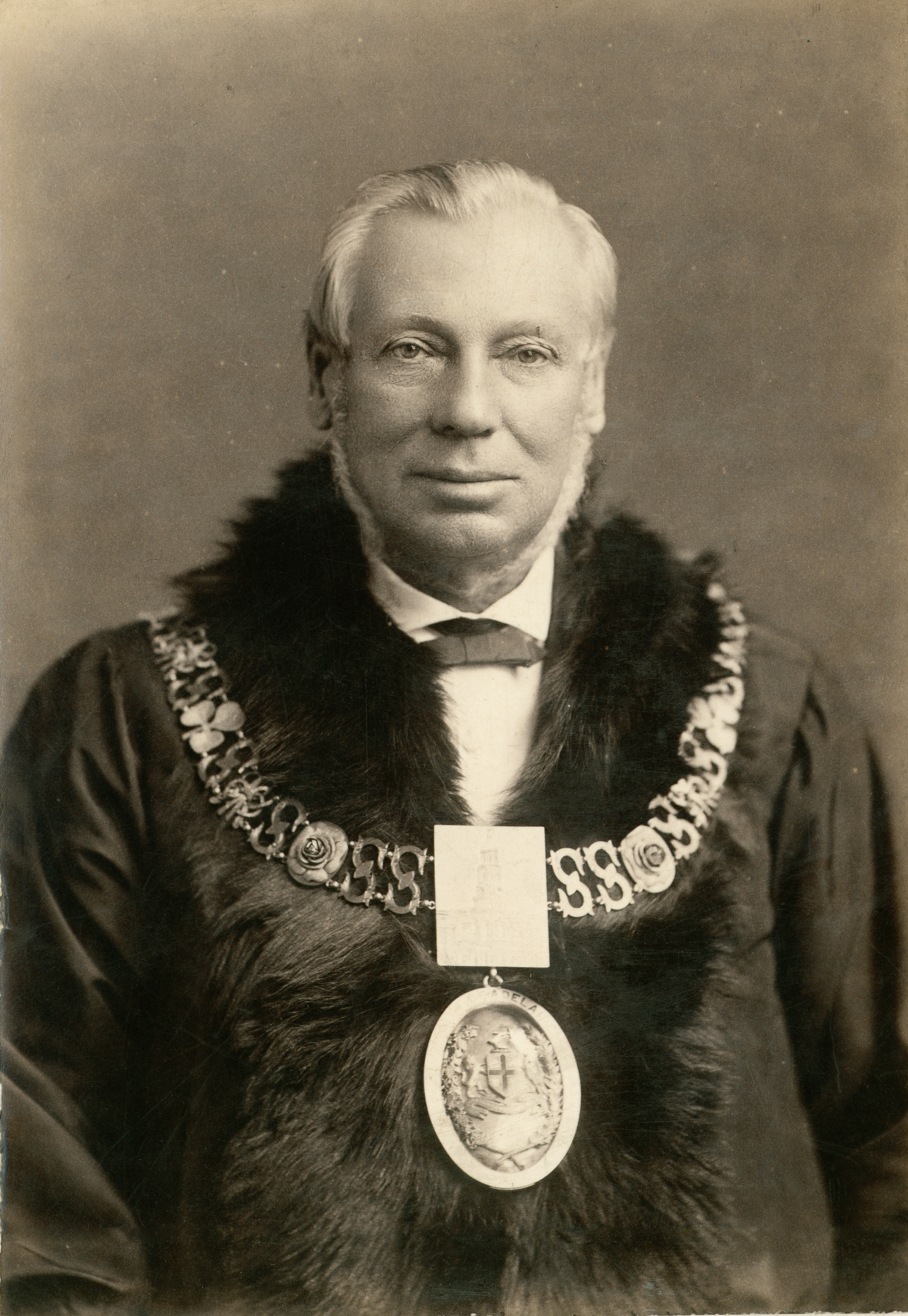

William Bundey (26 January 1826 – 2 April 1889) was an early settler of the colony of South Australia, a builder, and Mayor of Adelaide, South Australia from 1883 to 1886.

== Early life ==
Bundey was born in Beaulieu, Hampshire, England on 16 January 1826. He served an apprenticeship as carpenter and builder in London.

On 12 June 1848 he married Elizabeth Brandis in London, and the couple emigrated to the colony of South Australia, arriving on 19 November 1848.

== Career ==
Bundey worked as a carpenter and builder, and also had some success on the Victorian goldfields, before returning to Adelaide to set up his own business as a builder.

=== Public office ===
Bundey was elected councillor for Robe ward of the City Council in December 1861, and was re-elected in 1864 and 1866, before retiring in December 1868. On 2 December 1881 he was elected as an alderman of the City Council, which he held for two years.

In December 1883 Bundey was elected mayor of the city, and was re-elected mayor in be following December for another year. During this time, Adelaide Town Hall was built. After a third term following re-election in 1885, he retired from municipal activity.

== Other activities ==
Bundey was a member of the Odd Fellows, and in 1856 was Grand Master of Oddfellows in South Australia.

He was a prominent member of the Wesleyan Church, and was the founder, trustee, and treasurer of a small church in Melbourne Street, North Adelaide. He was a strong supporter of the temperance movement, and was president of the "band of hope" connected with his church.

In 1867, he was one of the founders of the City Permanent Building Society, and was elected chairman of the board of directors at the first meeting of this society.

As chairman of the Builders' Association, Bundey attended the inaugural dinner of the South Australian Institute of Architects at Beach's Cafe on 14 December 1886.

== Personal life ==
On 12 June 1848 he married Elizabeth Brandis at St James Church, Paddington, London. They had three children who survived to adulthood, Fanny, George and Annie, but three others did not survive infancy. Fanny, died in childbirth aged 22 in 1853.

Elizabeth, or Betsy, as she was known, was mayoress of Adelaide between 1883 and 1886. She was born on 27 February 1822 in Wiltshire, England, to Jane (née Ingram) and Christopher Brandis.

Betsy died at home on 11 July 1896, and she, along with their daughter Annie, and a grandchild named Hazel (daughter of George), who died aged 4, were buried in the same grave.

== Death ==
Bundey died suddenly at a wedding supper at the North Adelaide Institute on 2 April 1889, most likely from heart disease, aged 63.

His funeral was a large one, attended by many dignitaries, as well as members of Oddfellows, Foresters' and Rechabites' lodges in full regalia, and including a procession of 80 vehicles. He was buried in Walkerville cemetery, Adelaide.
