= Thomas Gaunt =

Thomas Ambrose Gaunt (1829 – 5 June 1890) was a jeweller, clockmaker, and manufacturer of scientific instruments, whose head office and showroom were at 337–339 Bourke Street, Melbourne, Victoria, Australia.

== History ==
Gaunt was born in London and emigrated to the colony of Victoria in 1852 and first worked for Henry Newman. By 1858 he had opened a shop in 14 Little Bourke Street. Around 1869 he moved to new premises at 337–339 Bourke Street, at the Royal Arcade corner.

He gained a reputation for reliability: each morning he set the main chronometer at the Bourke Street premises by telegraph signal from the Melbourne Observatory. He built the chronograph used for timing races at Flemington Racecourse, and was appointed their official timekeeper. In November 1876 he was made a life member of the Victorian Racing Club, though he had little interest in the sport. In 1885 he built and patented an electric scratching board system which ensured that notification of scratchings was made simultaneously throughout the course as soon as notified to the secretary.

== Some examples ==
A great many watches and clocks had the Gaunt name on the dial face and many public clocks were manufactured by the company but it is likely that the number of watches and small clocks produced by the company was small. Scientific instruments produced by the company included kymographs, thermographs, thermohygrographs and the like, as well as mercury-in-glass barometers and thermometers. They also manufactured gold and silver devotional jewellery and ecclesiastical ornaments, notably for St Patrick's Cathedral. Gaunt was a prominent Catholic.
Among their installations and notable products were:

- Caulfield Cups of Australian gold for ten consecutive years
- Chronograph at Flemington Racecourse, accurate to a quarter of a second, installed 1876.
- Clock on front elevation of Sumner Hall, Old Colonists' Homes, North Fitzroy
- Gog and Magog figures and clockwork mechanism in the Royal Arcade
- Chronograph at Flemington Racecourse, accurate to a quarter of a second, installed 1876.
- Tower clock, Sale 1886
- Tower clock, Mount Gambier Town Hall 1883
- Tower clock, Flinders Street station 1888
- Tower clock, Malvern Shire Hall 1891
- In 1903 a chronograph similar to Gaunt's 1876 model was made by the company for the Kalgoorlie Racing Club.
- Tower clock, Camperdown
- Lobby clock, General Post Office, Melbourne, to a design by Government Astronomer Robert Ellery
- Tower clock, Emerald Hill Town Hall
- Ceremonial scissors used at the opening of the Trans-Australian Railway, 1917.
- Tower clock, Adelaide Town Hall 1935

Gaunt's wife Jane died in September 1894, aged 64. They had one son and six daughters, but only three daughters survived to adulthood. Two became nuns at the Abbotsford Convent and one daughter, Cecelia Mary Gaunt (died 28 July 1941), married William Stanilaus Spillane on 22 September 1886 and had a large family.

Gaunt died at his home in Coburg, Victoria, leaving an estate valued at £41,453. The business continued as T. Gaunt & Co. after his death.
