= Thomas English (mayor) =

Architect and politician in the colony of South Australia (1820–1884)

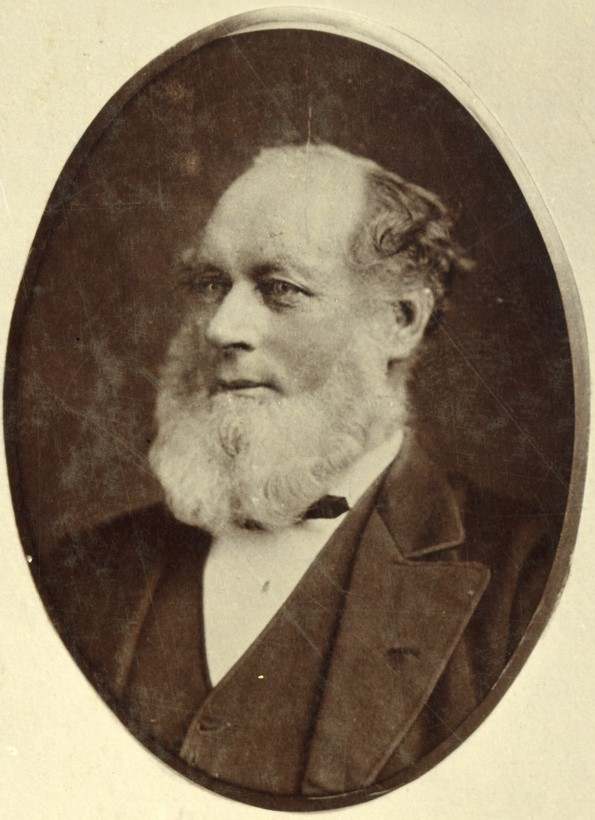
- Born: 9 July 1820; Maryport, England
- Died: 17 December 1884 (aged 64); Parkside, South Australia
- Occupation: architect

Mayor of the Corporation of Adelaide
- In office 1862–1863
- Preceded by: Edward Glandfield
- Succeeded by: Samuel Goode

Member of the Legislative Council of South Australia
- In office 1 March 1865 – 1 August 1878
- In office 29 May 1882 – 17 December 1884

Commissioner of Public Works
- In office 23 Oct 1865 – 3 May 1867
- Preceded by: Philip Santo
- Succeeded by: Philip Santo

Thomas English (9 July 1820 – 17 December 1884) was a leading colonial architect in South Australia, Mayor of Adelaide (1862–1863), and a member of the South Australian Legislative Council 1865–1878 and 1882–1884.

== Early life ==
Thomas English was born on 9 July 1820 in Maryport, Cumberland, England. His father, who had fought in the Peninsular War against Napoleon, died when Thomas was three.

He left England with his wife Margaret, and her brother Henry Brown, a builder, bound for the colony of South Australia. They arrived in Adelaide on 11 January 1850 on the barque Richardson, which was under the command of English's brother James.

== Public office ==
English was Mayor of Adelaide from 1862 to 1863.

He was Minister of Works, South Australia, and a member of the South Australian Legislative Council from 1 March 1865 to 1 August 1878 and from 29 May 1882 till his death, and was Commissioner of Public Works in the John Hart Government from 23 October 1865 to March 1966, and in the James Boucaut Ministry from the latter date till 3 May 1867.

== Architecture ==
=== Firms ===
English was for a time partner with brother-in-law Brown (28 August 1820 – 30 May 1881) in the building firm of English & Brown, (later Brown & Thompson), who developed the Glen Ewin quarry, the source of freestone for many of Adelaide's public buildings. They were first on Carrington Street, and later (1859) in Waymouth Street. Their partnership was dissolved when English was elected to parliament in 1865.

From 1865 until mid-February 1870, English practised as an architect on his own. From 19 February 1870 until 1873, he was in partnership with Rowland Rees, as English & Rees, Civil Engineers, Architects and Surveyors, of Temple Chambers, Currie Street. He then practised solo again until 1880.

George Klewitz Soward served his papers with English, then joined him in partnership in 1880 as English & Soward at Albion Chambers, Waymouth Street, and then Barnard Chambers in Currie Street, both in Adelaide city centre. English worked in the partnership until his death in 1884, when his son, Joseph Wallace English, who had also been articled to the firm, was made a partner. This partnership continued until Joseph's death in 1927.

=== Works ===
English's work as architect included the new Kent Town Brewery buildings at the corner of Rundle Street and Dequetteville Terrace, Kent Town, completed in 1876 for E. T. Smith.

In August 1879, English called for tenders to undertake the construction work to rebuild the Crown and Anchor Hotel in Grenfell Street. A new two-storey building was constructed to replace the former single-storey building later that year to English's designs, costing around £1,534. English & Soward advertised for tenders for stabling at the rear of the building in March 1880.

Between 1878 and 1881, Edwin Smith employed English and Soward to rebuild at least two hotels, the Old Colonist in Angas Street and the Torrens Arms in Kingswood, and design alterations to four others.

Other works designed by English include:

- Scots Church on North Terrace (built 1851; heritage-listed)
- Office building for The Advertiser, on the corner of King William and Waymouth Streets (built 1859; demolished 1958)
- Additions to Glenelg Congregational Church (1870)
- Various holiday and residential houses in Glenelg, including Glenara
- Townsend House, for former mayor of Adelaide William Townsend (built in Gothic style in 1878 as the South Australian Institution for the Blind, Deaf and Dumb, Brighton; continued as CanDo4Kids Townsend House; state heritage-listed)
- Princess Berkeley Hotel, Hindley Street, Adelaide (built 1878 for T. G. Waterhouse)
- Bath Hotel, Norwood, built around 1881, locally heritage-listed in August 2000

== Later life and legacy ==
Thomas English died at his residence in Parkside on 17 December 1884.

The Hundred of English was named after English when it was proclaimed in 1866. It includes the towns of Robertstown and Point Pass in the Mid North of South Australia.

Several of his buildings were heritage-listed and remain today.

Political offices
| Preceded by Edward Glandfield | Mayor of the Corporation of Adelaide; 1862–1863 | Succeeded by Samuel Goode |
| Preceded by Philip Santo | Commissioner of Public Works; 23 Oct 1865 – 3 May 1867 | Succeeded by Philip Santo |
