= Nathan Gaunt =

Australian singer-songwriter

- Origin: Darwin, Northern Territory, Australia, Perth, Western Australia
- Genres: Rock, folk rock, folk pop, blues
- Occupation(s): Singer-songwriter, musician
- Instrument(s): Vocals, multi-instrumentalist, guitar, lap steel, pedal steel, bass, piano, Hammond
- Labels: Daydreamusic
- Website: www.nathangaunt.com.au

Nathan Gaunt is an Australian singer-songwriter. His debut EP, Nothingwomb, was released in 1999. His style is an eclectic mix of rock, pop, blues, and folk. Along with vocals, Gaunt plays a variety of instruments including the guitar and piano.

== Early life ==
Gaunt was born in Darwin, Northern Territory. His family moved to Alice Springs in Central Australia and later settled in Perth, Western Australia, where he was influenced by the diverse music scene.

== Music career ==
According to Gaunt, the first musical instrument he played was the piano. He picked up his first guitar after seeing Jimi Hendrix play on late night TV.

Since 1999, Gaunt has released four EPs and four albums, including Headlights on the Hills. 2004's Escape and Return, which Gaunt co-produced with producer/engineer Jeremy Allom, contained the single Come Home. His most recent album is Halcyon Dazed which the Sydney Morning Herald said "channels the best of trip-hop, prog and alt-rock, soaring like some lost track from Radiohead's OK Computer." Regarding Gaunt, the newspaper also remarked that "Neil Finn might have some competition when it comes to crafting sadly beautiful valentines."

Gaunt has won a number of awards from the West Australian Music Industry Association (known as WAMi's), including "Best Male Vocalist" and "Best Guitarist."

He toured the United States for the first time in late 2007, with shows in Los Angeles, San Francisco, New York, Philadelphia and Washington, DC.

== Discography ==
=== Albums ===
Title	Details
Circledreams	Released: 2000; Label: Nathan Gaunt (NG-02); Format: CD, digital download
Free Your Mind (as Nathan Gaunt & The Blackeyed Dogs)	Released: 2002; Label: Nathan Gaunt (NG-04); Format: CD, digital download
Escape and Return	Released: 2004; Label: Nathan Gaunt; Format: CD, digital download

=== Extended plays ===
Title	Details
Nothingwomb	Released: 1999; Label: Nathan Gaunt (NG-01); Format: CD, digital download
Fly (as Nathan Gaunt & The Blackeyed Dogs)	Released: 2001; Label: Nathan Gaunt (NG-03); Format: CD, digital download
Free Your Mind (as Nathan Gaunt & The Blackeyed Dogs)	Released: 2002; Label: Nathan Gaunt (NG-04); Format: CD, digital download

== Awards ==
=== West Australian Music Industry Awards ===
The Western Australian Music Industry Awards (commonly known as WAMis) are annual awards presented to the local contemporary music industry, put on by the Western Australian Music Industry Association Inc (WAM). Gaunt has won seven awards.

Year	Nominee / work	Award	Result (wins only)
2001	Nathan Gaunt	Most Popular Male Original Instrumentalist	Won
2001	Nathan Gaunt	Most Popular Male Original Guitarist	Won
2002	Nathan Gaunt and the Black Eyed Dogs	Most Popular Local Original Blues Act	Won
2003	Nathan Gaunt	Most Popular Local Original Male Vocalist	Won
2003	Nathan Gaunt	Most Popular Local Original Guitarist	Won
2005	Nathan Gaunt	Best Male Vocalist	Won
2005	Nathan Gaunt	Best Guitarist	Won
