= E. J. Woods =

English-Australian architect (1839–1916)

E. J. Woods FRIBA
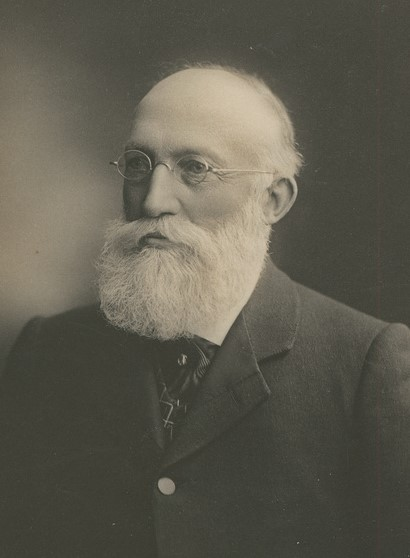
- Woods in 1900
- Born: Edward John Woods; 1839; London, England
- Died: 5 January 1916 (aged 76–77); Kent Town, South Australia, Australia
- Occupation: Architect
- Known for: Co-founding Woods & Bagot; Architectural work on Adelaide Town Hall; General Post Office, Adelaide; Parliament House, Adelaide; St Peter's Cathedral, Adelaide
- Spouse: Katharine Gooch (m. 1867)
- Children: 5
- Relatives: Lawrence Wells (son-in-law)

Edward John Woods (1839 – 5 January 1916) was a prominent architect in the early days of the colony of South Australia. He is known for being a co-founder of the large international architectural practice of Woods Bagot, and for designing a number of prominent civic buildings in Adelaide, including Parliament House, the General Post Office, and what is now the Mortlock Chamber in the State Library of South Australia. He was also responsible for much of the design detail of St Peter's Cathedral, based on original plans by English architect William Butterfield.

== Early life and education ==
Edward John Woods was born in London in 1839, and was educated at several private schools in England.

After deciding to become an architect, he served his articles for three years with Charles James Richardson. He subsequently spent two years in the office of T. E. Knightly.

== Career in South Australia ==
At the recommendation of William Browne, he set out for South Australia, arriving at Port Adelaide in the Blackwall, in 1860.

After a brief stint, for which he had no liking, on Browne's cattle station at Mount Gambier, he found employment as a draughtsman in the office of E. W. Wright, who later, as Wright & Woods, took him on as partner, and continued there for four years.

The first building he had to work on was the head office of the National Bank, King William Street, which was erected in 1864-1865 together with the Imperial Chambers. He also designed and superintended the erection of several branch offices of the bank, not only in the suburbs, but in the country at Mount Barker, Moonta and elsewhere. For the Bank of Adelaide he designed the tiny but elegant Bank of Adelaide building at Kapunda. The firm also designed several Catholic churches in the country, including the St Rose of Lima Catholic Church, Kapunda in 1866 (rebuilt in 1938 to designs by Herbert Jory)., as well as the St. Laurence Martyr church at North Adelaide.

As part of Wright & Woods, he was involved in designing the Adelaide Town Hall from 1863 to 1866.

He designed the Post Office building, winning the contract in open competition, and made the working drawings upon which tenders were called for by Wright & Woods, and accepted by the government. By this time (1866), the company had become Wright Woods & Hamilton with the addition of draftsman Edward Angus Hamilton, son of engineer G. E. Hamilton. They built a new flour mill at Port Adelaide for J. Dunn.

Woods designed "Central Chambers", a two-storey suite of offices at the corner of Waymouth and King William streets, opened in January 1873, previously the "Nimble Ninepence" store, which was destroyed by fire.

=== St. Peter's Cathedral ===
The next important building to come along was St. Peter's Cathedral. Bishop Augustus Short called, informing him that the church authorities would have nothing to do with any other local architect, and in 1869 he left the partnership with Wright, and was soon entrusted with the preparation of working drawings for the Cathedral. The original plans had been prepared by William Butterfield in London, but Bishop Short, then head of the Anglican Church of South Australia, deemed it necessary to enlarge the design and make other substantial modifications, and the first and subsequent portions of the cathedral were carried out under the direction of Woods.

The front, designed in 1890, was entirely his own, and had nothing whatever to do with Butterfield's original design. The building was carried out in three sections. After the first section had been completed nothing was done for 20 years or more. Then the church authorities proceeded with the building of the nave and a portion of the towers. Eventually Robert Barr Smith gave a donation of £10,000 with which to finish the towers. All this work came under his supervision, and he was sole architect from laying the very first stone to the last.

=== Government service ===
After a few years successful practice he took William McMinn into his business, which continued profitably for some time. About 1873 he joined the public service as architect to the Council of Education, while retaining the right to carry on private practice. He was appointed by Premier Boucaut as South Australia's architect-in-chief in 1878 but lost the right to continue practising privately.

During the years he held this office a large number of public buildings of all kinds, were erected under his supervision, notably the Governor of South Australia's summer residence at Marble Hill in 1879, at a cost of about £25,000. McMinn was the designing architect, with James Shaw as the manager for works.

Woods designed the first wing of the Public Library (now Mortlock Chamber in the State Library of South Australia), amending an earlier design by R. G. Thomas. The foundation stone was laid on 7 November 1879 and the library was opened in 1884.

Among the other numerous buildings carried out under his supervision were the new government offices in Victoria Square, the Quarantine Station, Adelaide Gaol, and Yatala Labour Prison, the Customs House at Port Adelaide and substantial additions to the Parkside Asylum.

In 1884 the government of the day was obliged to cut its staff, and Woods was among the many who were dismissed. It was at this time that Parliament House was erected.

=== Parliament House ===
While he was in the Government service the idea of building a State Parliament House was first mooted. He attended a special meeting of the building committee when the original plans from Taylor and Wright were found to be defective in many details, and he was told to entirely remodel them. Wright had already put in portion of the foundations when he came on the scene, and he took all these foundations out. He was then instructed to call for tenders for the first portion, which included the Chamber of the House of Assembly, smoke room, corridors, etc. The tender of the Kapunda Marble Company was accepted at around £100,000 and they proceeded with the work of laying the foundation and the lower portion of the buildings, which were faced with granite. Then there came some difficulty about the marble, and the committee decided not to go ahead, as the marble portion would cost them too much, and the Government, allowed the company to withdraw after something like £30,000 of work. The negotiations were handled with tact and efficiency by C. E. Owen Smyth, Woods' professional clerk, who had followed him from the Education Department. The work was retendered for, and was secured by James Shaw for about £102,000. Previous to this something like £30,000 had been spent by the Kapunda Marble Company. Woods supervised the contract right through until the building was completed, and put in all the fittings and all the special ventilation, which is different from that in any other building.

=== Back in private practice ===
Woods recommenced private practice, and did very well. The Catholic Archbishop of Adelaide contracted him to make additions to the St Francis Xavier's Cathedral. He put up several convents in Adelaide, Port Pirie, Broken Hill, and elsewhere, also numerous chapels in the city, suburbs, and country districts.

He was in 1898, with Edward Davies, appointed joint architect of the National Mutual Life Association building on King William Street.

Early in 1905 he took W. H. Bagot into partnership and as Woods and Bagot, Steamship Buildings, Currie Street, carried on business until 1913, when he retired, his health failing.

== Other interests ==
Woods was a founding member of the S.A. Rifle Association.

He was an art enthusiast, becoming in 1887 a foundation member and treasurer of the South Australian Society of Artists, then in 1892 a foundation member of the breakaway Adelaide Easel Club. He acted as arts judge for the Show Society.

== Personal life and family ==
Woods married Katharine Gooch (19 June 1849 – 18 January 1932) on 3 December 1867. Their home was "Richmond", 41 Dequetteville Terrace, Kent Town. They had two sons and three daughters:

- Alice Marion Woods (14 Feb 1870 – ) married explorer Lawrence Allen Wells OBE (30 April 1860 – 11 May 1938) on 22 September 1892.
- Gertrude Madeleine Woods (19 Oct 1872 – ) married Walter C. Addison on 8 May 1900. Addison was a son of Arthur Richman Addison of Orroroo and a champion rifle shooter. Son Gerald B. Addison was also a champion marksman.
- (Alfred) Bertram Woods (1 May 1876 – ) married Lillian Ireland ( – 13 October 1942) at Rondebosch, Cape Town on 28 November 1905. Bertram was with Union Bank of Australia in Adelaide, secretary to the Cecil Rhodes Trust, then a public servant in Rhodesia.
- Ernest Edward Woods (22 Jan 1879 – 25 December 1943) had a career with National Bank. He married Maye Alice Jones on 27 January 1902.
- Marjorie Josephine Woods (29 April 1891 – ) married Alfred Stevens of Victoria on 28 March 1917.

Alfred Thomas Woods (c. 1841 – 16 November 1892), a surveyor with the Surveyor-General George Goyder in the Northern Territory, was a brother.

== Recognition ==
Woods was elected a fellow of the Royal Institute of British Architects in 1892.

The Advertiser of 13 June 1936, in an article on St Peter's Cathedral, in part read:

The work of revising and completing the designs was placed in the hands of a local architect, who had been trained in England, Mr. E. J. Woods. In spite of his other responsibilities (for some time he was Architect-in-Chief of the colony), Mr. Woods made the building of the Cathedral his life work, and experts have nothing but praise for his craftsmanship. He was small of stature and suffered from a slight limp, yet he frequently climbed the scaffolding to the summit of the towers wearing a long-tailed coat and a tall, black beaver hat. An extremely modest and retiring man, he never received the recognition due to his genius. After his death in 1915 an inscription was placed on one of the stones in the fabric of the Cathedral. It can be seen on one of the buttresses facing King William road- It reads simply— EDWARD JOHN WOODS, F.R.I.B.A.. ARCHITECT OF THIS CATHEDRAL, 1869 to 1915.
