= Brougham Place Uniting Church =

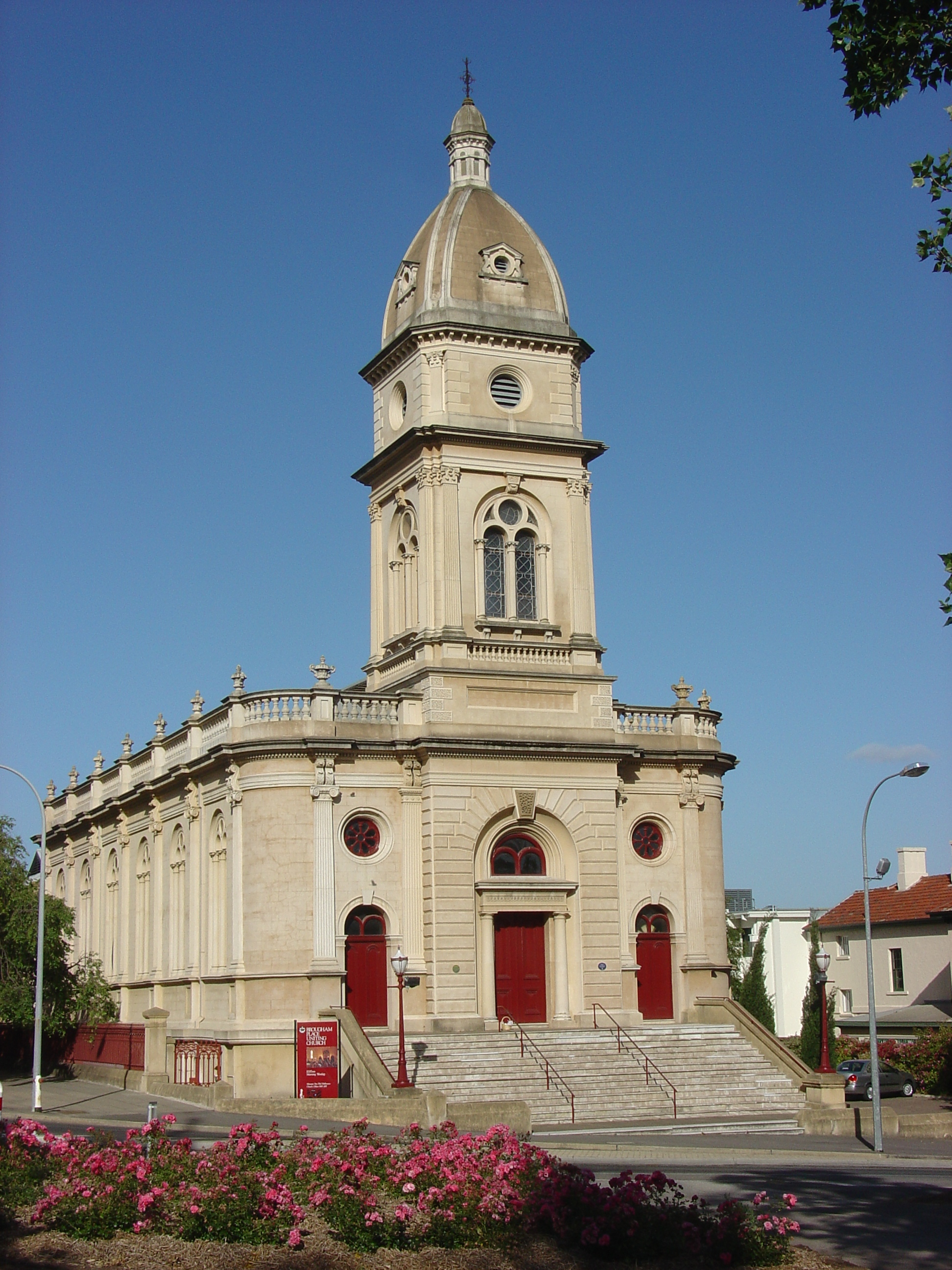
- Main entrance of Brougham Place Uniting Church, 2004
- Brougham Place Uniting Church
- 34°54′34″S 138°36′1″E
- Location: Brougham Place, North Adelaide, South Australia
- Country: Australia
- Denomination: Uniting (since 1977)
- Previous denomination: Congregational (1859 – 1977)
- Website: bpuc.org

History
- Former name: North Adelaide Congregational Church
- Status: Church
- Founded: 20 October 1859
- Founder: Rev. James Jefferis

Architecture
- Functional status: Active
- Architects: Edmund Wright; E. A. Hamilton; Thomas Frost (tower and hall)
- Architectural type: Church
- Style: Victorian Free Classical
- Groundbreaking: 15 May 1860
- Completed: 14 July 1872
- Construction cost: c. A£11,000

Administration
- Parish: Brougham Place

Brougham Place Uniting Church is a Uniting church located at Brougham Place, North Adelaide, South Australia.

== History ==
Edmund Wright won an architectural competition for the design of the church in 1859, then Brougham Place Congregational Church. The foundation stone was laid on 15 May 1860.

A tower was added in 1871 and a lecture hall in 1878, designed by architect Thomas Frost. The pipe organ was built in 1881 at which time it was "the largest two manual organ in the colony", and restored in 1914.

The church was at one time referred to as Jefferis' Church for James Jefferis, the first pastor, who served from its inception on 20 October 1859, when services were held in the temperance hall in Tynte Street, North Adelaide, to 1877, then from 1895 to 1901, when he retired.

It looks over Brougham Gardens in the Adelaide Parklands.
