= W. A. Hughes =

Australian politician

William Alexander Hughes (1816 – 22 June 1892) was an early settler in the British colony of South Australia. He was Town Clerk of Adelaide 1856–1868. After his resignation he was found guilty of forgery and embezzlement.

== History ==
W. A. Hughes was a son of Robert Hughes, a merchant of Liverpool, England and Mrs. Hughes (c. 1776 – 30 January 1867). He emigrated to South Australia aboard Delhi, arriving in December 1839, and built a residence at Brougham Place, North Adelaide. Jane Sawle emigrated aboard Warrior with her parents and siblings, arriving in November 1839. They were married at Trinity Church, Adelaide on 29 August 1844 and had six surviving children; the three sons were prize-winning students at J. L. Young's Adelaide Educational Institution.

He served for a time as clerk to solicitor James Hurtle Fisher, and was highly involved in all manner of public institutions: He was a founder of the Adelaide Lodge of IOOF on 1 January 1841 and their first Corresponding Secretary. He was secretary of the Adelaide Mining Association 1846 and the Wheal Gawler Mines Association 1848 He was founding member of North Adelaide Institute in 1851. He was in 1853 appointed secretary to the Licensed Victuallers' Society, and to the Yatala District Council. He replaced R. B. Colley as Clerk and Collector, West Torrens District Council, in 1853. He was Secretary of the Association of Chairmen of District Councils. He held various responsible positions for Christ Church, North Adelaide, where he was a regular worshipper.

He was in December 1853 candidate for Councillor, Robe ward of the City Council, but resoundingly beaten by one Edward Lawson. In December 1855 he was elected Councillor, Robe ward for Adelaide City Council, after resignation of Field, but resigned in early February 1856 preparatory to applying for position of Town Clerk, W. T. Sabben having on 4 February resigned that post. Hughes was appointed to the office on 18 February. Alexander Cumming was elected to Robe ward. In taking this position he found it necessary to relinquish many of his other responsibilities, but not Freemasonry or Christ Church.

Hughes was drawn into bitter controversy at Christ Church: with the death of Archdeacon Woodcock in 1868, a replacement had to be found. The church trustees, whose primary function was building maintenance, property and finances, and of the five members two were not even church members, opted for Rev. Charles Marryat, while the five representatives of the congregation (including Hughes, who served as their spokesman) selected Rev. T. Nowell Twopeny. Bishop Short, to the dismay of many in the congregation, exercised his casting vote in favour of Marryat, to whom he was related. The die was cast however, as Marryat had been consecrated and the appointment could not be undone.

At the end of 1868 the Council declared all positions vacant. Hughes did not apply for his old job, and the newly appointed City Treasurer Thomas Worsnop was deputised to take on his duties pro tem. This voluntary resignation came as a surprise to many, but then the truth came to light, largely due to the conscientiousness of mayor Fuller, that Hughes had been in 1866 and 1867 embezzling Council funds by clever manipulation of the cheque account, which could only be detected by careful comparison of the amount withdrawn and that written on the chequebook stubs. The truth came to light through Hughes's method of repaying the defalcations; by destroying cheques and paying creditors cash out of his own pocket. Hughes was tried, convicted and sentenced to eight years' jail with hard labour.

It is likely Hughes was released in late 1873, but not made public. He subsequently carried on business as an accountant, first privately, then with the firm of Giles & Smith. He died at his home on Eton Street, Malvern.

== Family ==
William Alexander Hughes married Jane Sawle ( – ) on 29 August 1844. Their children included:

- Marian Jane Hughes (18 August 1845 – ) married William Liston on 20 March 1869
- Frederic Boulton Hughes (13 January 1848 – October 1925) married Mary Ann Doherty in 1868; he married again, to Christina Yeates ( – 1923) on 15 May 1872 He was proprietor of the South Australian Glass Works of Brompton.

- William Sawle Hughes (1877 – 30 December 1928) was secretary of the West Torrens Football Club, killed when struck by motor car on Rundle Street.

- Edwin Sawle Hughes (26 February 1850 – 1926) married Mina Melvin Whiting on 10 August 1875.
- Emma Augusta Hughes (14 August 1853 – 1945) married Harold Sawle Radford (21 November 1855– 20 November 1942) on 19 February 1885. Maj. Ralph Dillon Radford (1890–1951) was a son.
- William Alexander Hughes (1855 – 29 January 1943) married Frances Frearson (1860–1925) in 1880. He was a major insurance executive.
- Sophia Anne Hughes (13 December 1858 – 5 November 1938)
