= Electoral results for the district of Adelaide =

South Australian district election results

This is a list of electoral results for the Electoral district of Adelaide in South Australian state elections from the district's first election in 1938 until the present.

== Members for Adelaide ==
Member	Party	Term
Doug Bardolph	Independent Labor	1938–1944
Bob Dale	Labor Party	1944–1947
Herbert George	Labor Party	1947–1950
Sam Lawn	Labor Party	1950–1971
Jack Wright	Labor Party	1971–1985
Michael Duigan	Labor Party	1985–1989
Michael Armitage	Liberal Party	1989–2002
Jane Lomax-Smith	Labor Party	2002–2010
Rachel Sanderson	Liberal Party	2010–2022
Lucy Hood	Labor Party	2022–present

== Election results ==
=== Elections in the 2020s ===
==== 2026 ====
2026 South Australian state election: Adelaide
Party	Candidate	Votes	%	±%
Labor	Lucy Hood	10,189	42.6	+2.0
Liberal	Julian Amato	5,084	21.3	−18.5
Greens	Bronte Colmer	3,531	14.8	+1.3
One Nation	Aoi Baxter (disendorsed)	2,771	11.6	+11.6
Independent	Keiran Snape	2,002	8.4	+8.4
Australian Family	Dan Casey	317	1.3	−1.0
Total formal votes		23,894	97.6	±0.0
Informal votes		591	2.4	±0.0
Turnout		24,485	87.3	+0.4
Two-candidate-preferred result
Labor	Lucy Hood	16,307	68.2	+12.0
Liberal	Julian Amato	7,587	31.8	−12.0
Labor hold		Swing	+12.0	

==== 2022 ====
2022 South Australian state election: Adelaide
Party	Candidate	Votes	%	±%
Labor	Lucy Hood	9,477	40.6	+4.9
Liberal	Rachel Sanderson	9,273	39.8	−7.4
Greens	Sean Cullen-MacAskill	3,146	13.5	+0.8
Australian Family	Robert Walker	545	2.3	+2.3
Animal Justice	Deanna Carbone	502	2.2	+2.2
Real Change	Tom Birdseye	380	1.6	+1.6
Total formal votes		23,323	97.6	
Informal votes		569	2.4	
Turnout		23,892	86.9	
Two-party-preferred result
Labor	Lucy Hood	13,097	56.2	+7.1
Liberal	Rachel Sanderson	10,226	43.8	−7.1
Labor gain from Liberal		Swing	+7.1	

Distribution of preferences: Adelaide
Party	Candidate	Votes	Round 1		Round 2		Round 3		Round 4	
Party	Candidate	Votes	Dist.	Total	Dist.	Total	Dist.	Total	Dist.	Total
Quota (50% + 1)		11,662								
Labor	Lucy Hood	9,477	+48	9,525	+167	9,692	+239	9,931	+3,166	13,097
Liberal	Rachel Sanderson	9,237	+52	9,325	+64	9,389	+289	9,678	+548	10,226
Greens	Sean Cullen-MacAskill	3,146	+70	3,216	+253	3,469	+245	3,714	Excluded	
Australian Family	Robert Walker	545	+106	651	+122	773	Excluded			
Animal Justice	Deanna Carbone	502	+104	606	Excluded					
Real Change	Tom Birdseye	380	Excluded							

=== Elections in the 2010s ===
==== 2018 ====
2018 South Australian state election: Adelaide
Party	Candidate	Votes	%	±%
Liberal	Rachel Sanderson	10,226	47.2	−2.1
Labor	Jo Chapley	7,750	35.8	+0.5
Greens	Robert Simms	2,739	12.6	+0.7
Dignity	Betty-Jean Price	946	4.4	+1.1
Total formal votes		21,661	97.8	−0.3
Informal votes		487	2.2	+0.3
Turnout		22,148	88.8	+2.4
Two-party-preferred result
Liberal	Rachel Sanderson	11,043	51.0	−2.0
Labor	Jo Chapley	10,618	49.0	+2.0
Liberal hold		Swing	−2.0	

2014 South Australian state election: Adelaide
Party	Candidate	Votes	%	±%
Liberal	Rachel Sanderson	10,543	48.7	+4.2
Labor	David O'Loughlin	7,812	36.1	+2.7
Greens	Robert Simms	2,551	11.8	+0.1
Dignity for Disability	Anna Tree	748	3.5	+1.6
Total formal votes		21,654	98.0	+1.8
Informal votes		433	2.0	−1.8
Turnout		22,087	89.1	−0.9
Two-party-preferred result
Liberal	Rachel Sanderson	11,341	52.4	−1.8
Labor	David O'Loughlin	10,313	47.6	+1.8
Liberal hold		Swing	−1.8	

2010 South Australian state election: Adelaide
Party	Candidate	Votes	%	±%
Liberal	Rachel Sanderson	8,956	44.5	+10.9
Labor	Jane Lomax-Smith	6,710	33.3	−14.5
Greens	Brett Ferris	2,344	11.7	+2.4
Save the RAH	Ruben Sebben	704	3.5	+3.5
Dignity for Disability	Samantha Paior	374	1.9	−0.4
Gamers 4 Croydon	Tom Birdseye	350	1.7	+1.7
Family First	Laury Bais	303	1.5	−1.2
Fair Land Tax	Nick Apostolou	282	1.4	+1.4
FREE Australia	Shaun McGrath	97	0.5	+0.5
Total formal votes		20,120	96.2	−0.1
Informal votes		787	3.8	+0.1
Turnout		20,907	90.0	+0.8
Two-party-preferred result
Liberal	Rachel Sanderson	10,909	54.2	+14.5
Labor	Jane Lomax-Smith	9,211	45.8	−14.5
Liberal gain from Labor		Swing	+14.5	

=== Elections in the 2000s ===
2006 South Australian state election: Adelaide
Party	Candidate	Votes	%	±%
Labor	Jane Lomax-Smith	9,247	47.8	+7.4
Liberal	Diana Carroll	6,500	33.6	−8.8
Greens	Nikki Mortier	1,797	9.3	+4.1
Democrats	Richard Pascoe	558	2.9	−3.0
Family First	Bill Villani	517	2.7	+1.2
Dignity for Disabled	Tracey Rice	441	2.3	+2.3
No Rodeo	Amanda Barlow	277	1.4	+1.4
Total formal votes		19,337	96.3	−0.1
Informal votes		749	3.7	+0.1
Turnout		20,086	89.2	−2.5
Two-party-preferred result
Labor	Jane Lomax-Smith	11,640	60.2	+9.2
Liberal	Diana Carroll	7,697	39.8	−9.2
Labor hold		Swing	+9.2	

2002 South Australian state election: Adelaide
Party	Candidate	Votes	%	±%
Liberal	Michael Harbison	8,621	42.4	−1.3
Labor	Jane Lomax-Smith	8,215	40.4	+6.8
Democrats	Cherie Prosser	1,197	5.9	−11.0
Greens	Jake Bugden	1,058	5.2	+0.1
No Hoo Haa	Albert Bensimon	492	2.4	+2.4
Family First	Andrea Mason	310	1.5	+1.5
SA First	Ben Krieg	236	1.2	+1.2
One Nation	Roy Bedford	143	0.7	+0.7
Independent	Tom Bertuleit	61	0.3	+0.3
Total formal votes		20,333	96.4	−0.4
Informal votes		774	3.6	+0.4
Turnout		21,107	91.7	+1.2
Two-party-preferred result
Labor	Jane Lomax-Smith	10,375	51.0	+3.2
Liberal	Michael Harbison	9,958	49.0	−3.2
Labor gain from Liberal		Swing	+3.2	

=== Elections in the 1990s ===
1997 South Australian state election: Adelaide
Party	Candidate	Votes	%	±%
Liberal	Michael Armitage	8,499	46.9	−11.6
Labor	Kate Callaghan	5,536	30.5	+3.8
Democrats	Sue Meeuwissen	2,987	16.5	+7.3
Greens	Mark Moran	1,114	6.1	+6.1
Total formal votes		18,136	96.5	−0.8
Informal votes		649	3.5	+0.8
Turnout		18,785	87.4	
Two-party-preferred result
Liberal	Michael Armitage	10,042	55.4	−8.7
Labor	Kate Callaghan	8,094	44.6	+8.7
Liberal hold		Swing	−8.7	

1993 South Australian state election: Adelaide
Party	Candidate	Votes	%	±%
Liberal	Michael Armitage	11,045	58.5	+11.9
Labor	Clare Scriven	5,043	26.7	−15.2
Democrats	Mark Andrews	1,741	9.2	−0.5
Natural Law	Peter Fenwick	606	3.2	+3.2
Democratic Socialist	Andrew Hall	458	2.4	+2.4
Total formal votes		18,893	97.3	−0.8
Informal votes		524	2.7	+0.8
Turnout		19,417	90.9	
Two-party-preferred result
Liberal	Michael Armitage	12,101	64.1	+12.8
Labor	Clare Scriven	6,792	35.9	−12.8
Liberal hold		Swing	+12.8	

=== Elections in the 1980s ===
1989 South Australian state election: Adelaide
Party	Candidate	Votes	%	±%
Liberal	Michael Armitage	8,290	48.6	+1.4
Labor	Michael Duigan	6,777	38.9	−8.3
Democrats	Peter Mann	1,626	9.5	+4.0
Call to Australia	Howard Shepherd	353	2.0	+2.0
Total formal votes		17,046	98.0	+0.7
Informal votes		347	2.0	−0.7
Turnout		17,393	92.5	+3.1
Two-party-preferred result
Liberal	Michael Armitage	9,090	53.3	+3.9
Labor	Michael Duigan	7,956	46.7	−3.9
Liberal gain from Labor		Swing	+3.9	

1985 South Australian state election: Adelaide
Party	Candidate	Votes	%	±%
Labor	Michael Duigan	7,875	47.3	+4.3
Liberal	Michael Wilson	7,849	47.2	−3.8
Democrats	Christopher Wurm	916	5.5	−0.6
Total formal votes		16,640	97.3	
Informal votes		458	2.7	
Turnout		17,098	89.4	
Two-party-preferred result
Labor	Michael Duigan	8,414	50.6	+3.4
Liberal	Michael Wilson	8,226	49.4	−3.4
Labor gain from Liberal		Swing	+3.4	

- Adelaide became a notional 2.8 percent Liberal held seat in the redistribution.

1982 South Australian state election: Adelaide
Party	Candidate	Votes	%	±%
Labor	Jack Wright	7,888	60.6	+6.1
Liberal	Terry McClean	3,822	29.4	−3.6
Democrats	Catherine Hannaford	1,295	10.0	−1.3
Total formal votes		13,005	90.6	−2.8
Informal votes		1,356	9.4	+2.8
Turnout		14,361	88.9	−0.8
Two-party-preferred result
Labor	Jack Wright	8,536	65.6	+4.9
Liberal	Terry McClean	4,469	34.4	−4.9
Labor hold		Swing	+4.9	

=== Elections in the 1970s ===
1979 South Australian state election: Adelaide
Party	Candidate	Votes	%	±%
Labor	Jack Wright	7,436	54.5	−11.7
Liberal	Terry McClean	4,506	33.0	−0.8
Democrats	Reginald Goldsworthy	1,540	11.3	+11.3
Australia	Howard Houck	169	1.2	+1.2
Total formal votes		13,651	93.4	−2.7
Informal votes		962	6.6	+2.7
Turnout		14,613	89.7	−0.4
Two-party-preferred result
Labor	Jack Wright	8,291	60.7	−5.5
Liberal	Terry McClean	5,360	39.3	+5.5
Labor hold		Swing	−5.5	

1977 South Australian state election: Adelaide
Party	Candidate	Votes	%	±%
Labor	Jack Wright	9,996	66.2	+5.9
Liberal	Terry McClean	5,102	33.8	+12.8
Total formal votes		15,098	96.1	
Informal votes		605	3.9	
Turnout		15,703	90.1	
Labor hold		Swing	+4.0	

1975 South Australian state election: Adelaide
Party	Candidate	Votes	%	±%
Labor	Jack Wright	9,048	60.3	−6.4
Liberal	David Mount	3,146	21.0	−12.3
Liberal Movement	Robert Hercus	2,812	18.7	+18.7
Total formal votes		15,006	94.1	−0.5
Informal votes		934	5.9	+0.5
Turnout		15,940	91.2	−1.7
Two-party-preferred result
Labor	Jack Wright	9,334	62.2	−4.5
Liberal	David Mount	5,672	37.8	+4.5
Labor hold		Swing	−4.5	

1973 South Australian state election: Adelaide
Party	Candidate	Votes	%	±%
Labor	Jack Wright	9,792	66.7	+3.8
Liberal and Country	Milton Blake	4,892	33.3	+1.1
Total formal votes		14,684	94.6	−2.4
Informal votes		840	5.4	+2.4
Turnout		15,524	92.9	−0.8
Labor hold		Swing	−0.6	

1970 South Australian state election: Adelaide
Party	Candidate	Votes	%	±%
Labor	Sam Lawn	9,590	62.9	
Liberal and Country	Raymond Kidney	4,917	32.2	
Communist	Elliott Johnston	743	4.9	
Total formal votes		15,250	97.0	
Informal votes		463	3.0	
Turnout		15,713	93.7	
Two-party-preferred result
Labor	Sam Lawn	10,259	67.3	
Liberal and Country	Raymond Kidney	4,991	32.7	
Labor hold		Swing		

=== Elections in the 1960s ===
1968 South Australian state election: Adelaide
Party	Candidate	Votes	%	±%
Labor	Sam Lawn	8,315	61.3	−11.6
Liberal and Country	Donald Maddocks	4,026	29.7	+29.7
Communist	Elliott Johnston	1,226	9.0	+3.8
Total formal votes		13,567	96.4	+3.5
Informal votes		542	3.8	−3.5
Turnout		14,109	93.7	+1.8
Two-party-preferred result
Labor	Sam Lawn	9,418	69.4	−10.1
Liberal and Country	Donald Maddocks	4,149	30.6	+30.6
Labor hold		Swing	N/A	

1965 South Australian state election: Adelaide
Party	Candidate	Votes	%	±%
Labor	Sam Lawn	10,444	72.9	−4.0
Democratic Labor	George Basivovs	2,372	16.6	−1.9
Social Credit	Thomas Ellis	774	5.4	+5.4
Communist	Elliott Johnston	746	5.2	+0.6
Total formal votes		14,336	92.9	−2.1
Informal votes		1,100	7.1	+2.1
Turnout		15,436	91.9	+0.8
Two-candidate-preferred result
Labor	Sam Lawn	11,204	78.2	−2.1
Democratic Labor	George Basivovs	3,132	21.8	+2.1
Labor hold		Swing	−2.1	

1962 South Australian state election: Adelaide
Party	Candidate	Votes	%	±%
Labor	Sam Lawn	12,706	76.9	+3.9
Democratic Labor	William Ahem	3,062	18.5	+1.0
Communist	Elliott Johnston	757	4.6	−4.9
Total formal votes		16,525	95.0	+0.8
Informal votes		863	5.0	−0.8
Turnout		17,388	91.1	+1.4
Two-candidate-preferred result
Labor	Sam Lawn	13,274	80.3	+0.2
Democratic Labor	William Ahem	3,251	19.7	−0.2
Labor hold		Swing	+0.2	
