= David Plumridge =

Australian local government councillor (1932–2024)

David Plumridge AM
- Official portrait, c. 2014

Deputy Lord Mayor of Adelaide
- In office 6 December 2010 – 6 December 2012
- Lord Mayor: Stephen Yarwood
- Preceded by: Michael Henningsen
- Succeeded by: Michael Llewellyn-Smith

Area Councillor for the Adelaide City Council
- In office 20 October 2007 – 27 November 2014

Mayor of the City of Salisbury
- In office 1993–1997
- Preceded by: Patricia St Clair-Dixon
- Succeeded by: Tony Zappia
- In office 1983–1987
- Preceded by: Ronald White
- Succeeded by: Patricia St Clair-Dixon

Personal details
- Born: David Allen Plumridge; 1 September 1932
- Died: 10 March 2024 (aged 91)
- Spouse: Gladys
- Children: 2

David Allen Plumridge (1 September 1932 – 10 March 2024) is an Australian local government councillor who served as Deputy Lord Mayor of Adelaide from 2010 to 2012.

Plumridge was an Australian local government councillor who served in South Australia for several decades. Before entering local government, he worked as an architectural draughtsman. He was elected to the City of Salisbury in 1965 and served until 1998, including eight years as mayor. He subsequently remained involved in local government and planning issues, serving as president of the Local Government Association of South Australia and as National President of Local Government from 1994 to 1996. In 1995, he signed the Commonwealth–Local Government Accord with Prime Minister Paul Keating at the Second National Assembly of Australian Local Government.

After leaving the City of Salisbury, Plumridge continued his involvement in Adelaide planning and parklands issues. He represented the Adelaide Park Lands Preservation Association in consultations with the Adelaide City Council and in 2005 became the inaugural chair of the South East City Residents Association. He was elected to the Adelaide City Council in 2007 and re-elected in 2010, serving as Deputy Lord Mayor from 2010 to 2012. During his two terms, he was involved in debates concerning planning, development, public access and the Adelaide Park Lands. He remained an Adelaide City councillor until his unsuccessful re-election bid in 2014.

== Career ==
=== Early career (1965–2005) ===
Before entering local government, Plumridge worked as an architectural draughtsman. He was elected to the City of Salisbury in 1965 and remained a member until 1998, serving as mayor for eight years. He also served on the Northern Adelaide Waste Management Authority and the Northern Adelaide Regional Organisation of Councils. During his local government career, he served as president of the Local Government Association of South Australia for two years and was National President of Local Government from 1994 to 1996.

In 1995, Plumridge signed the Commonwealth–Local Government Accord with Prime Minister Paul Keating at the Second National Assembly of Australian Local Government. The accord established a framework for cooperation between the Commonwealth and local governments, with the aim of improving the delivery of government services. The signing was witnessed by the Minister for Housing and Regional Development, Brian Howe. That year, Plumridge criticised the South Australian government's sale of approximately 11 hectares (27 acres) of land at Walkley Heights, arguing that it could affect the planning process and surrounding properties. The government responded that the land had been publicly offered for sale since March.

After leaving the City of Salisbury, Plumridge continued his involvement in local government and planning issues. In July and August 2004, he represented the Adelaide Park Lands Preservation Association in its submission to the Adelaide City Council concerning the General and Park Lands Plan Amendment Report, raising concerns about proposed commercial development, public notification, development assessment and the proposed Park Lands Trust, Community Land Management Plans and heritage provisions. On 4 August, he presented the association's concerns during the council's public consultation process. In November 2005, he was among those who established the South East City Residents Association (SECRA) and became its inaugural chair; the organisation was formed in opposition to proposals for a permanent motorsport complex at Victoria Park.

=== Adelaide City Council (2007–2009) ===
Adelaide 500 at the Adelaide Street Circuit in Victoria Park, 2007

Plumridge and his wife, Gladys, moved to the City of Adelaide in the early 2000s. He became involved in issues concerning the Adelaide Park Lands and opposed proposals associated with the Adelaide 500 motor race and the development of Victoria Park. On 28 August 2007, Plumridge was nominated for one of five area councillor positions on the Adelaide City Council. He was one of 20 candidates, alongside Francis Wong and Anne Moran. At the election on 20 October, Plumridge was elected fourth of the five successful candidates, receiving 445 first-preference votes after the distribution of preferences.

Soon after taking office in 2007, Plumridge opposed a proposed lease associated with a A$55 million redevelopment of the Victoria Park grandstand involving the South Australian Motor Sport Board and South Australian Jockey Club. The Adelaide City Council rejected the proposal by a vote of 9–2, with Plumridge among three newly elected area councillors who opposed it. In 2008, he raised concerns about the construction of a recycled-water pipeline from Glenelg to the Adelaide Park Lands, questioning the project's progression from planning to construction and calling for surveys of the proposed route, particularly in relation to large trees, as well as supervision of trenching, pipe installation and vehicle movements within the parklands.

In February 2009, Plumridge opposed a proposal to exclude the public from an Adelaide City Council discussion concerning the South Australian Cricket Association's proposed western grandstand redevelopment at Adelaide Oval. He also opposed aspects of the redevelopment that he considered could reduce public ownership or access to the parklands. Later that year, he criticised the increased use of confidential council meetings under the Local Government Act 1999, arguing that matters involving public money, council assets, contracts, tenders, leases and licences should generally be considered publicly unless confidentiality was necessary. He also criticised aspects of the council's public consultation processes, arguing that residents were not always provided with sufficient information to assess proposals. On 16 December 2009, Plumridge was appointed by the Adelaide City Council to the Capital City Committee. He also served on the Adelaide Park Lands Authority, where he supported retaining the parklands while allowing uses compatible with their role within the city.

=== Deputy Lord Mayor of Adelaide (2010–2012) ===
On 21 September 2010, Plumridge was nominated for one of five Adelaide City Council area councillor vacancies and was subsequently re-elected, beginning his second term on 3 December. On 6 December, he was elected Deputy Lord Mayor of Adelaide. In this role, he participated in debates concerning planning, development and the parklands, and criticised aspects of the South Australian government's consultation and planning processes, including the 30-Year Plan for Greater Adelaide. He also raised concerns about promotional activities associated with the Adelaide 500, including the use of a transportable display home in the parklands. On 10 February 2011, the Adelaide City Council appointed Plumridge to the Board of Management of the Adelaide Park Lands Authority under the Adelaide Park Lands Act 2005. By 2012, he was also serving on the City Design and Character Policy Committee, City Development and Sustainability Committee, Community Services, Events and Facilities Committee, Corporate Planning, Governance and Finance Committee, Reconciliation Committee and Audit Committee.

Riverbank Footbridge across the River Torrens, viewed from Elder Park in 2026

In 2012, Plumridge criticised the South Australian government's approach to population growth, infrastructure and development planning and opposed aspects of the Greater Riverbank Precinct Implementation Plan concerning the parklands and central city. In July, he supported the Adelaide City Council retaining ownership and control of a proposed $40 million footbridge across the River Torrens as part of the Adelaide Oval redevelopment, while noting the need to consider its future maintenance costs. He also supported the council's endorsement of the $30 million redevelopment of Rundle Mall, including new paving and lighting, tree planting and the removal of several cafes and kiosks.

In August 2012, while acting as Lord Mayor, he supported retaining 40 white cedar trees in the northern parklands threatened by the Adelaide Oval redevelopment. The city council voted 7–2 to retain them. In September, he opposed the proposed demolition of a 99-year-old boathouse on the River Torrens used by the Popeye cruise operator and supported investigating its repair and potential heritage listing. In October, he criticised what he considered inadequate state government consultation with city residents over development proposals, citing the proposed $200 million New Mayfield development. On 1 December, his appointment to the Board of Management of the Adelaide Park Lands Authority was extended until 30 November 2014. On 6 December, his term as Deputy Lord Mayor ended, with Michael Llewellyn-Smith succeeding him, while Plumridge remained an Adelaide City councillor.

=== Later council career (2013–2014) ===
In 2013, Plumridge continued to oppose proposals for commercial and other development in the Adelaide Park Lands where he considered them inconsistent with their recreational and open-space functions, while supporting development compatible with those purposes and advocating consideration of the parklands' heritage. In June, he opposed a proposal to use former railway yards near the River Torrens and the new Royal Adelaide Hospital as temporary parking for Adelaide Oval events. The site was subsequently approved for conversion to grassed open space.

In April 2014, Plumridge raised concerns about noise levels recorded during the Soundwave concert at Bonython Park, after monitoring found that one stage had exceeded the permitted 110-decibel limit and the event promoter forfeited a $10,000 bond. On 16 September, Plumridge was nominated for re-election as an Adelaide City Council area councillor, contesting one of four vacancies against eight other candidates, including Robert Simms. At the final count on 27 November, he was unsuccessful, receiving 598 first-preference votes against a quota of 1,456.

== Honours and awards ==
Plumridge was appointed a Member of the Order of Australia (AM) in the 1993 Queen's Birthday Honours for service to local government and the community. He received the Local Government Association of South Australia's John Legoe Award for 2011–12. On 6 December 2022, he was appointed a Justice of the Peace for a ten-year term.

== Personal life ==
David Allen Plumridge was born on 1 September 1932. He was married to Gladys, with whom he had two daughters, Wendy and Deanne.

Plumridge died in Adelaide on 10 March 2024, aged 91, following a prolonged illness.

Civic offices
Preceded by Michael Henningsen	Deputy Lord Mayor of Adelaide; 2010 – 2012	Succeeded by Michael Llewellyn-Smith
Preceded by Patricia St Clair-Dixon; Ronald White	Mayor of the City of Salisbury; 1993 – 1997; 1983 – 1987	Succeeded by Tony Zappia; Patricia St Clair-Dixon
