= Michael Llewellyn-Smith (architect) =

Australian architect, town planner and city manager (born 1942)

Michael Llewellyn-Smith AM KStJ JP
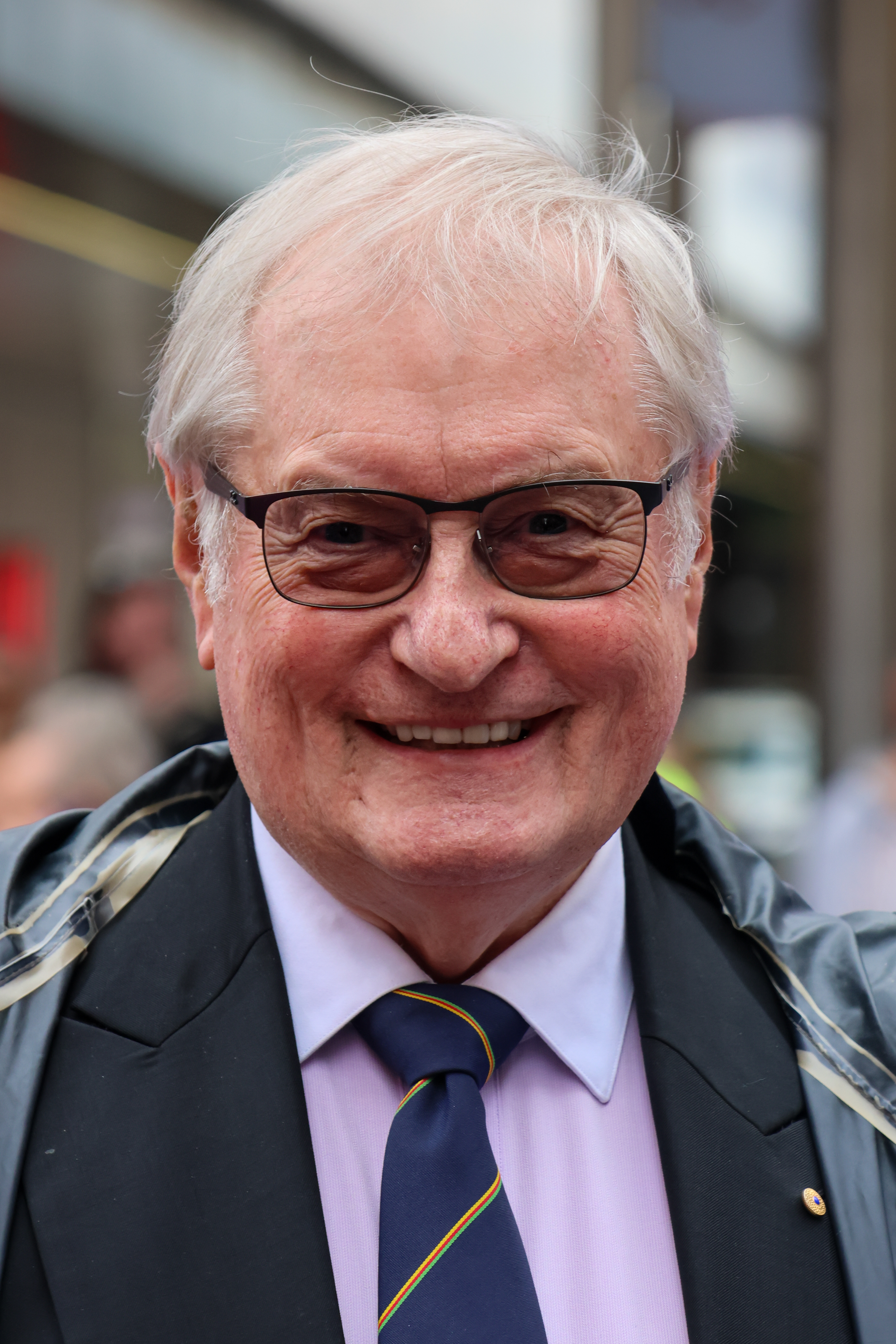
- Llewellyn-Smith in 2026

Deputy Lord Mayor of Adelaide
- In office 6 December 2012 – 31 January 2014
- Lord Mayor: Stephen Yarwood
- Preceded by: David Plumridge
- Succeeded by: Natasha Malani

Area Councillor for the Adelaide City Council
- In office November 2010 – September 2014

Personal details
- Born: Michael John Llewellyn-Smith; 28 November 1942 (age 83) Tintern, Monmouthshire, Wales
- Spouse: Ida Jonassen
- Education: University of Cambridge; University of Sydney; University of Adelaide (MA; PhD)
- Occupation: Architect; city manager; town planner
- Website: llewellyn-smith.weebly.com

Academic background
- Thesis: Innovation and difference: city planning in Adelaide from 1972 until 1993 within the historical framework of the politics of City/State relations from 1836 (2010)

Academic work
- Discipline: Urban and regional planning
- Institutions: University of Adelaide

Michael John Llewellyn-Smith (born 28 November 1942) is an Australian architect, town planner and city manager who served as Deputy Lord Mayor of Adelaide from 2012 to 2014.

Llewellyn-Smith was born in Wales and grew up in South Wales before moving to London at the age of 14. He attended Neath Grammar School and Alleyn's School before studying architecture at Pembroke College, Cambridge. After qualifying as an architect, he worked in London and developed an interest in town planning. In the late 1960s, he received a Commonwealth Scholarship to teach architecture at the University of Sydney, moving to Australia in January 1970 to undertake postgraduate study in city planning.

Llewellyn-Smith worked in Sydney's planning administration from 1971, becoming involved in the planning of Woolloomooloo alongside the architect and planner George Clarke and Builders Labourers Federation leader Jack Mundey. He moved to Adelaide in 1974 and served as City Planner of the Adelaide City Council until 1982, during which time he was involved in the development of Rundle Mall and the implementation of the City of Adelaide Plan. On 1 January 1982, he became Town Clerk and Chief Executive Officer of the City of Adelaide, serving until 1994. He subsequently worked in local government and consultancy, and completed a PhD at the University of Adelaide in 2010 on planning in Adelaide between 1972 and 1993. He returned to the Adelaide City Council as an area councillor in November 2010, served as Deputy Lord Mayor under Stephen Yarwood from December 2012 to January 2014, and retired from the council in September 2014.

== Early life and education ==
Michael John Llewellyn-Smith was born on 28 November 1942 near Tintern Abbey in South Wales. He grew up in the valleys of South Wales before moving to London at the age of 14. His father, Raymond, came from a family of Welsh Methodist ministers, while his mother, Nesta, came from a farming family in mid-Wales. He attended Neath Grammar School and later Alleyn's School in Dulwich, where he served as school captain and as an under officer in the Combined Cadet Force. Before beginning university, he received a Rhodes Travel Scholarship to Canada and travelled through several Canadian cities with other Rhodes scholars. Llewellyn-Smith studied architecture at Pembroke College, Cambridge, entering the university at the age of 19.

== Career ==
=== Early career and planning (1960s–1970) ===
After qualifying as an architect, he worked in private practice and for the Corporation of the City of London. While practising architecture in London, he developed an interest in town planning after working on a new school in North London and becoming involved in the local authority's development control procedures. He subsequently undertook a part-time town planning course at University College London while continuing his architectural practice. He also spent a practicum year in the Melbourne office of architect Roy Grounds.

In the latter part of the 1960s, Llewellyn-Smith came to Australia on a Commonwealth Scholarship to teach architecture at the University of Sydney. He moved to Sydney in January 1970 on a two-year contract to teach architecture, with his faculty position allowing him to undertake a master's degree in city planning. He taught first-year architecture and tutored at Wesley College while studying. He also worked part-time for the architectural practice McConnel Smith & Johnson as part of a consortium headed by George Clarke that prepared the first City of Sydney Strategic Plan. His planning thesis examined pedestrian movement in Sydney.

=== Sydney planning (1971–1974) ===
Following the submission of the Strategic Plan to the Sydney City Council in late 1971, Llewellyn-Smith applied for the proposed position of Head of the Strategic Planning Branch. He subsequently became Chief Planning Officer and then Deputy City Planner following the departure of the incumbent to the Land and Environment Court. As Deputy City Planner, he was responsible for implementing the Strategic Plan through Action Planning Projects, including the planning of Woolloomooloo.

Llewellyn-Smith opposed the State Planning Authority's commercial zoning of Woolloomooloo, which envisaged the area as an extension of Sydney central business district despite its population of about 4,000 people. He considered the scale of commercial development encouraged by land consolidation incentives unsuitable for Sydney's transport system. He became involved with the Woolloomooloo Residents' Action Group during its campaign against the proposed redevelopment and developed a relationship with Builders Labourers Federation leader Jack Mundey during the green ban campaign. He subsequently persuaded the Sydney City Council to reconsider the area's zoning and became involved in negotiations with developer Sid Londish, who had reached a similar conclusion about the proposed development.

Following the 1972 Australian federal election, Llewellyn-Smith participated in negotiations between the Whitlam and Askin–Cutler governments and the Sydney City Council over Woolloomooloo's future. He led a committee representing the three levels of government, which recommended rezoning the area for residential use. The federal government subsequently provided A$23 million for the acquisition of land by the New South Wales Housing Commission. In 1973, Llewellyn-Smith became Project Director of the Woolloomooloo Action Plan, which involved consultation with residents' organisations and negotiations between the three levels of government. The resulting agreement provided for the state government to acquire and rezone land, the federal government to fund the project and the council to undertake residential renewal. Llewellyn-Smith later chaired the Woolloomooloo Review Committee.

=== Adelaide City Planner (1974–2010) ===
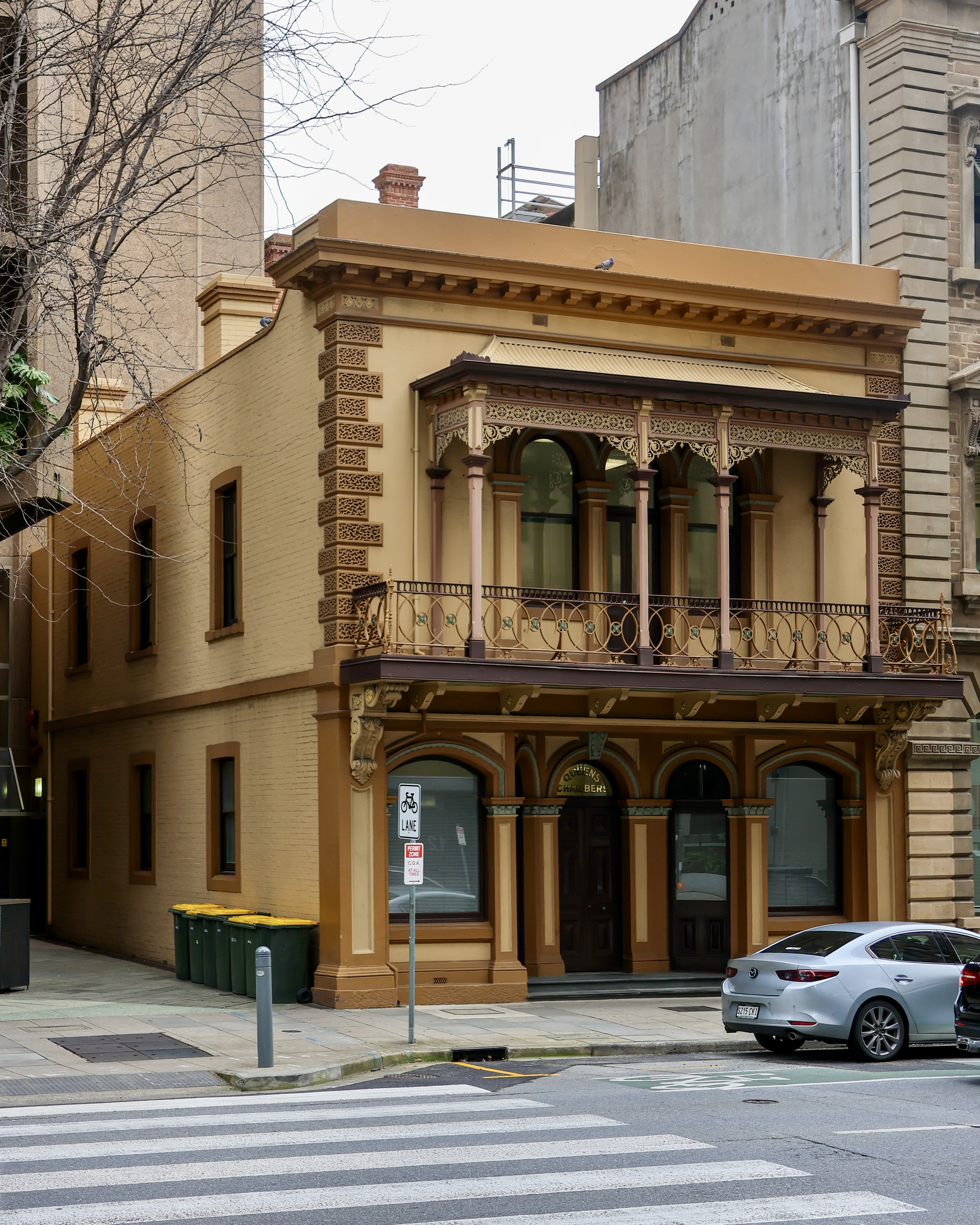
Queen's Chambers building on Pirie Street, Adelaide, in 2026

Llewellyn-Smith moved to Adelaide in 1974, becoming City Planner and taking part in the implementation of the City of Adelaide Planning Study. From 1976 to 1981, he was involved in implementing the First City of Adelaide Plan, which developed George Clarke's planning study into the City Plan and Principles of Development Control. During his time as Adelaide City Planner, he was involved in the preservation of Queens' Chambers in 1974, the closure of Rundle Street and its conversion into Rundle Mall in 1975, and the planning and approval of the Rundle Mall car park in 1976.

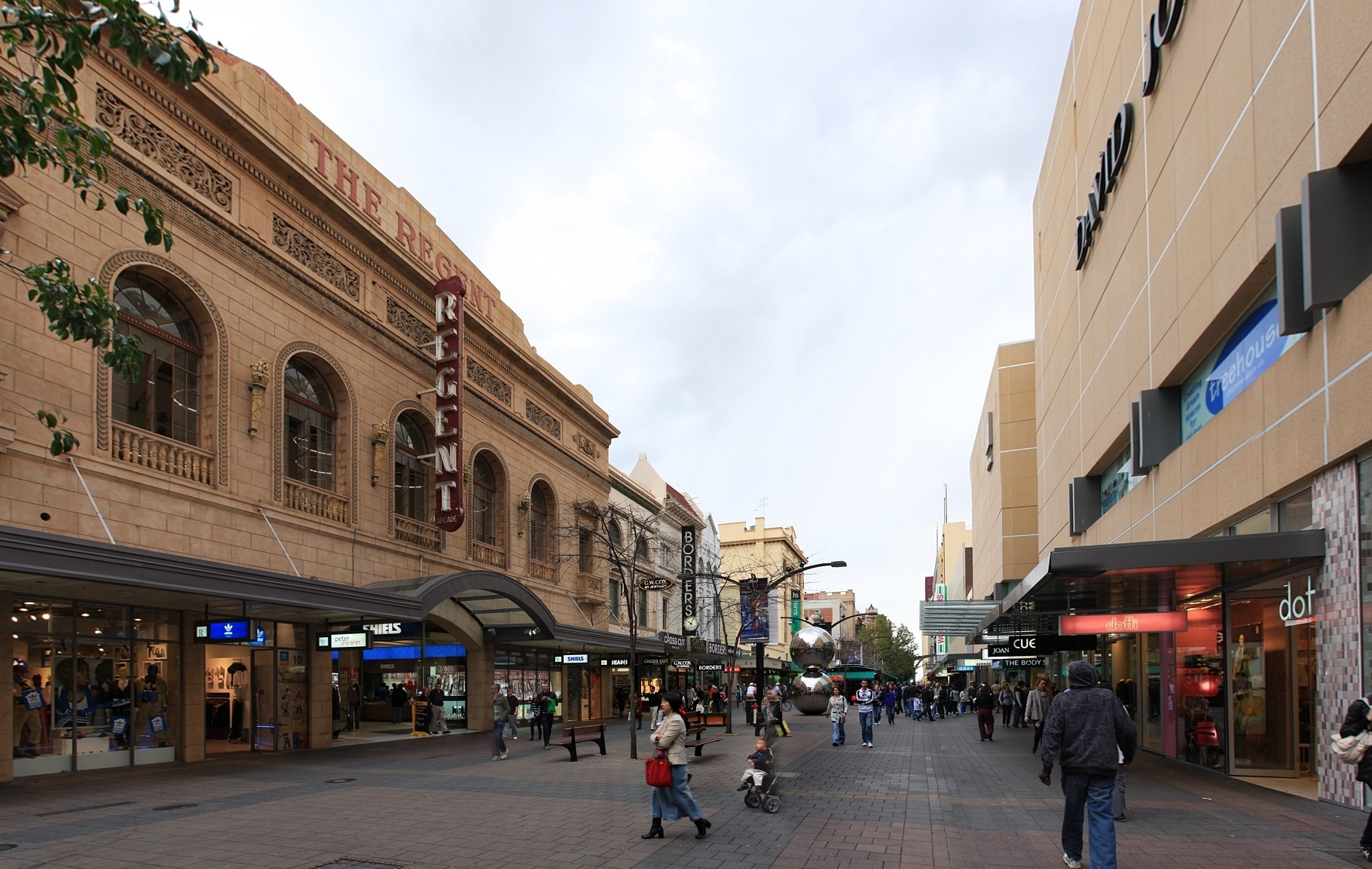
Rundle Mall, looking east, in May 2009

The proposal for turning Rundle Street into a pedestrian area was the topic of discussion in the Adelaide City Council in 1974. The design was criticised by Councillor and architect John Chappell, who found it repetitious and inappropriate, while the city council approved the concept of creating the mall but disagreed with the design suggested by the consultants. At that time, Llewellyn-Smith was only 31 years old and worked as the Deputy City Planner in Sydney. He was appointed as the City Planner of Adelaide and he supported the idea of converting the street into a pedestrian mall, provided it was backed by most shopkeepers and merchants. Llewellyn-Smith later participated in the creation of Rundle Mall which was opened in 1976.

Llewellyn-Smith served as the first City Planner of the Adelaide City Council from 1974 to 1982 and was a member of the City of Adelaide Planning Commission from 1977 to 1982. On 1 January 1982, he became Town Clerk and Chief Executive Officer of the City of Adelaide. During his administration, he was responsible for planning, building and development aspects of the Citicom project concerning the redevelopment of the eastern side of Hindmarsh Square. In 1991, he was involved in preserving the historic facades of the East End Fruit and Produce Market while residential development was incorporated into the council's strategy for increasing the city's residential population.

During his career in local government, Llewellyn-Smith held positions in professional and local government organisations. He served as State President and National Councillor of the Australian Institute of Management, State and National President of Local Government Managers Australia, and Vice President of the International City Management Association. He was also associated with the Royal Australian Planning Institute, serving as a National Councillor and President of its South Australian Division.

After 12 years as Town Clerk and Chief Executive Officer of the City of Adelaide, Llewellyn-Smith left the positions in 1994 and subsequently worked in local government and private consultancy. He was City Manager of the City of Prospect from 1995 to 2002, Deputy Presiding Member of the Development Assessment Commission from 1998 to 2001, and Presiding Member of the Major Developments Panel and Development Assessment Commission from 2001 to 2008. Through his consultancy firm, Llewellyns International, he undertook projects for governments and municipalities in Australia and overseas, including work in Kraków, Colombo and Bloemfontein. Llewellyn-Smith returned to academic study at the University of Adelaide and completed a Doctor of Philosophy in 2010. His thesis examined planning in Adelaide between 1972 and 1993, with particular attention to the relationship between the City of Adelaide and the South Australian government. His research informed his criticism of changes to the city's planning framework following the repeal of the City Act in 1993.

=== Adelaide City Council (2010–2014) ===
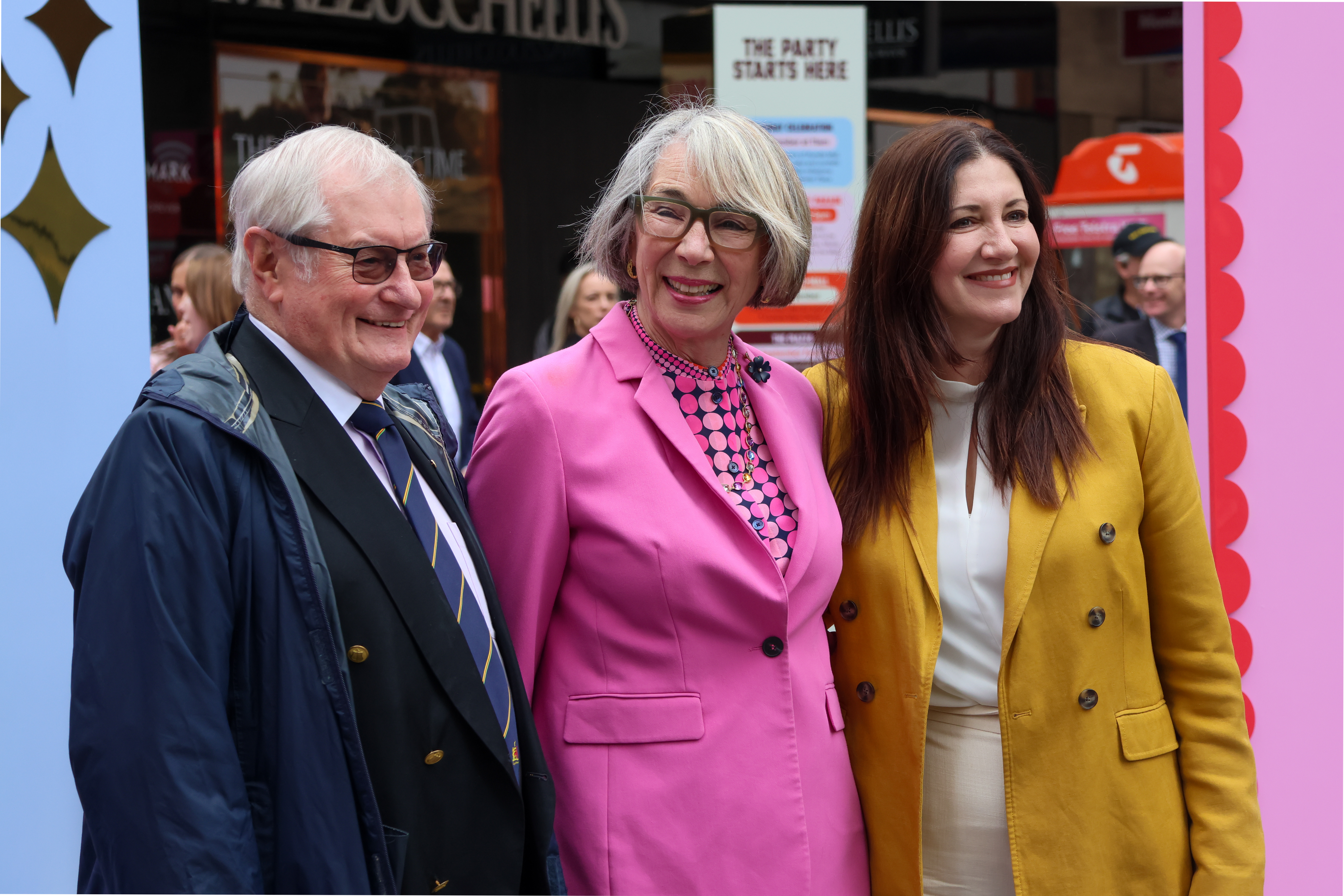
Llewellyn-Smith, Jane Lomax-Smith and Mary Couros at the 50th anniversary of Rundle Mall on 1 September 2026

In November 2010, Llewellyn-Smith was elected as an area councillor of the Adelaide City Council. During his time on the council, he was involved in several planning, heritage and administrative issues. In 2012, he moved to revoke the council's decision to reject an application concerning the removal of 40 white cedar trees and an adjoining footpath from the Adelaide Oval licence area. He chaired the City Planning and Development Committee from July to December 2012 before becoming Deputy Lord Mayor of Adelaide on 6 December 2012 under Lord Mayor Stephen Yarwood. In 2013, he supported the redesign of Rundle Mall, while opposing the Planning Minister John Rau's decision to remove heritage listing from 42 of 78 properties recommended for listing by the council. In December that year, while serving as Acting Lord Mayor, Llewellyn-Smith participated in discussions concerning the administration and financing of the Adelaide Park Lands. He stated that the city council regarded the park lands as serving both Adelaide residents and the wider public and had spent more than $110 million on their maintenance since 2008. He completed his term as Deputy Lord Mayor on 31 January 2014.

In May 2014, Llewellyn-Smith proposed addressing the absence of a street number for landmarks on the northern side of North Terrace after the South Australian Health and Medical Research Institute reported difficulties receiving deliveries without a conventional street address. He retired from the Adelaide City Council in September 2014. In June 2024, he addressed the council in support of establishing a City of Adelaide Museum.

== Honours and awards ==
Llewellyn-Smith held professional memberships and affiliations with several planning, architectural and local government organisations. He became a Life Fellow of the Planning Institute of Australia in November 2007, following his election at the organisation's South Australian Division Awards on 9 November. He was also a Life Fellow of the Australian Institute of Architects and a Life Member of Local Government Managers Australia. He was formerly a Fellow of the Australian Institute of Management and the Royal Society of Arts, and a member of the Royal Institute of British Architects, Royal Town Planning Institute and International City/County Management Association (ICMA).

In 2002, ICMA presented Llewellyn-Smith with its Award for Career Excellence, named in honour of former executive director Mark E. Keane. The award recognised his career in local government, including more than 30 years of service in London, Sydney, Adelaide and Prospect. He was subsequently awarded Life Membership of Local Government Managers Australia following a recommendation to the organisation's South Australian division.

Llewellyn-Smith was appointed to a number of community and institutional positions, including Honorary Secretary of the Royal Humane Society, Governor of Scotch College, member of the University of Adelaide Council and President of the University of Adelaide Alumni Association. He was also a Rotarian, a Knight of the Sovereign Order of St John of Jerusalem (KStJ) and a Justice of the Peace (JP). He remained involved in higher education through teaching, guest lecturing, research and alumni activities.

On 26 January 2013, Llewellyn-Smith was appointed a Member of the Order of Australia (AM) in the Australia Day Honours for service to local government through promoting city and state relations and planning. In 2019, he received the University of Adelaide Vice-Chancellor's Distinguished Alumni Award for his contribution to city planning practice and urban planning in Sydney and Adelaide.

== Personal life ==
Llewellyn-Smith is married to Ida Jonassen, an associate professor of cardiology at Flinders University. They have a son, George Raymond Iestyn Llewellyn-Smith.

Civic offices
Preceded by David Plumridge	Deputy Lord Mayor of Adelaide; 2012 – 2014	Succeeded by Natasha Malani
