= 1971 Adelaide state by-election =

The 1971 Adelaide state by-election was a by-election held on 3 July 1971 for the South Australian House of Assembly seat of Adelaide. This was triggered by the death of state Labor MHA Sam Lawn.

== Results ==
The Communist Party, who contested the previous election on 4.9 percent of the vote, did not contest the by-election. Labor easily retained the seat.

Adelaide state by-election, 3 July 1971
Party	Candidate	Votes	%	±%
Labor	Jack Wright	6,898	59.0	−3.9
Liberal and Country	Helen Finch	4,211	36.0	+3.8
Australia	Frederick Thompson	575	4.9	+4.9
Total formal votes		11,684	95.4	−1.6
Informal votes		562	4.6	+1.6
Turnout		12,246	74.3	−19.4
Labor hold		Swing	N/A	

== See also ==
- List of South Australian state by-elections
