= Francis Wong (businessman) =

Australian businessman

Francis Wong OAM FAICD
- Wong in 2026

Area Councillor for the Adelaide City Council
- In office 20 October 2007 – 12 November 2010

Personal details
- Born: Francis Wong Ki Yuong Brunei
- Occupation: Businessperson; company director

Francis Wong Ki Yuong is a Bruneian–Australian business entrepreneur and company director.

Wong was born in Brunei and moved to Australia in 1988 through the Business Migration Program. In 1990, Wong set up Encounter Australia and Lai Lai Travel, and then started the Australia-Brunei Darussalam Business Council in 1993. Between 1998 and 2003, Wong was part of the Business Advisory Panel of the federal Minister for Immigration. In 2006, he became a director of the Australian Tourism Export Council.

Wong joined the ranks of local government after being elected to Adelaide City Council from 2007 to 2010, including a failed bid for the position of Lord Mayor in 2010 when Stephen Yarwood won the election. He then went on to further pursue his work in the field of tourism and international trade by joining numerous boards and creating organisations that concentrate on relations between Australia and Asian nations. In 2021, he became the founding president of the South Australia–Vietnam Business Council and is currently a member of the international advisory board of the Brunei Economic Development Board.

== Business career ==
Lai Lai Travel at Grote Street, in 2026

Francis Wong Ki Yuong was born in Brunei and moved to Australia in 1988 under the Business Migration Scheme. The individual started Encounter Australia, where he was its founding chairman and managing director, then started Lai Lai Travel in 1990. In 1993, the entrepreneur founded and became president of the Australia–Brunei Darussalam Business Council.

By 1998, Wong was the managing director of Encounter Australia, which is located in Adelaide and where he initiated the Encounter Australia Wine Tours project; the project is focused on the promotion of wine tourism for rich international tourists through cooperation with Qantas, the Australian Tourism Commission, and several state tourism organisations.

From 1998 to 2003, Wong was a member of the Business Advisory Panel to the Minister for Immigration. By 2006, Wong was a member of the Board of the Australian Tourism Export Council (ATEC) in his capacity as an inbound tour operator of Encounter Australia. That year, he established Endeavour Australia.

== Adelaide City Council ==
=== Adelaide City councillor (2007–2010) ===
On 20 October 2007, Wong was elected as councillor of Adelaide City Council. In that year, he backed a A$55 million plan from the South Australian Motor Sport Board (SAMSB) and the South Australian Jockey Club to rebuild the grandstand at Victoria Park racecourse. He was among two of eleven elected Adelaide City councillors to back the leasing needed for the project. The council rejected the plan, resulting in calls for legislation by the Rann government.

Wong was appointed as member of SAMSB on 11 June 2008. Subsequently, his role became important for a District Court case regarding whether the ability of SAMSB members to vote in council decisions regarding motorsports. In 2008, he founded Top 8 Wines. He was also associated with the multicultural initiative of Port Adelaide Football Club, which resulted in bringing 850 Chinese, Korean, Vietnamese and Indian attendees to an Australian Football League (AFL) game against North Melbourne, featuring Chinese lion dance, cultural performances and a pre-game barbeque. On 27 October, Wong ran for the post of Deputy Lord Mayor of Adelaide against Stephen Yarwood, who won the council vote nine votes to two.

From 2008 to 2013, Wong was a member of the Australia Day Council South Australia Board. After his failure to get re-elected for city council in 2008, there were rumours that the SA Liberal Party members considered Wong as a possible candidate for parliament, possibly challenging Education Minister Jane Lomax-Smith for the state seat of Adelaide.

In April 2009, Wong, the national president of the Australia–Brunei Darussalam Business Council as well as a city councillor, recommended boosting bilateral trade through the Brunei Halal brand, investment by Australians in agriculture and fisheries, and trade delegations and exhibitions. His term as Adelaide City councillor ended on 12 November 2010.

=== 2010 Adelaide City Council election ===
Wong announced his candidacy for Lord Mayor of Adelaide in February 2010, campaigning for the development of fashion, retail, tourism and the arts through festivals, events and support for emerging artists. His campaign received support from designer Bowie Wong. He also advocated a permanent grandstand at Victoria Park to reduce costs and disruption and support events in the eastern city centre.

By October 2010, Wong's campaign had been endorsed by Alexander Downer as well as Peter Malinauskas of the union. Advertising was done through kwp! and Leigh McClusky. Wong had estimated his campaign cost as much as $40,000 which was self-funded and he claimed that he would not take any money from major property developers in order to avoid conflict of interest. Candidate Ralph Clarke criticised the publicity oriented nature of the campaign rather than its policies. Other candidates were Yarwood, Arnie Rossi, Creston Magasdi and Jeffrey Wheare. In the run-up to the elections of 12 November, Wong saw Yarwood as the biggest competitor and thought again about his earlier position against a public debate. Wong, along with Ralph Clarke, Yarwood, and two other candidates, engaged in a debate at a hotel in Adelaide on 9 November; however, Rossi was not present at the debate.

However, Wong came in second place with 2,285 preference votes, coming in behind Yarwood's 3,169 preference votes, but before Clarke's 1,427 preference votes. After this outcome, Wong expressed no regret about contesting the elections. He pointed out that his defeat was partly due to the negative campaign waged by Clarke, although he also stated that the campaign helped him make more community contacts. Wong failed in his bid to be the second Chinese-born Lord Mayor after Alfred Huang.

== Tourism and international business ==
Wong speaking at the 2025 Australia–ASEAN Business Forum in Adelaide

Wong (second from left) with ASEAN Secretary-General Kao Kim Hourn (second from the right) at the 2026 Australia–ASEAN Business Forum in Adelaide

In 2010, Wong became a member of the Orana Australia board. Later in 2011, he joined the board of the Women's & Children's Hospital Foundation. He was against the proposal of privatising the SA Travel Centre owing to competition and conflict of interest issues. After resigning from Orana in October 2012, he became an Adelaide United ambassador in December 2012 and made football connections with Brunei. Wong also established a connection with club owner Robert Gerard.

In October 2013, Wong attended the Adelaide City Council focus group that suggested that Qingdao is an appropriate sister city because of its port and industrial economy. In 2014, he established the Australia–ASEAN Business Forum which held its first conference in Adelaide. He also promoted the use of football in building ties between South Australia and Asia.

In 2015, Wong joined the board of directors of the Adelaide Festival Centre Foundation and Tourism Australia on 8 October. In March 2016, he was nominated to the Football Federation SA board for increasing participation of the community and forging links with Asia. He resigned from the board of Adelaide United on 6 May for his emphasis on grass roots football. On 31 March 2017, he chaired the Council for International Trade & Commerce SA, hosting an ASEAN 50 Years Celebration Business Forum in Adelaide.

Wong was the Honorary President and Senior Advisor of the Australia–China Friendship & Development Association in 2018. He joined the Global Tourism and Travel Partnership's International and Technical Advisory Committee in April, and his term expired on 7 October. In November, he suggested merging festivals such as Mad March and events with tourist packages to persuade business visitors to stay longer.

After previously serving as chairman, Wong was the first president of the South Australia–Vietnam Business Council established on 27 November 2021. At its diplomatic anniversary luncheon on 28 February 2023, Governor Frances Adamson praised him for his leadership and the work of the council for developing bilateral relations. As of 2026, he is a member of the Brunei Economic Development Board's International Advisory Committee and works for Becamex IDC in Australia.

== Honours and awards ==
Wong was honoured with South Australian tourism awards in 1988 and the International Business Ambassador Award by CITCSA in 2002, 2003, and 2004. In 2005, he was made Life Business Ambassador by the same council.

In 2014, he was bestowed the ATEC's first-ever Captain Trevor Haworth Award for Most Outstanding Contribution to Tourism by an Individual, South Australia's Most Outstanding Contribution to Tourism by an Individual, and received the Medal of the Order of Australia (OAM) for service to business and the community in the 2014 Australia Day Honours. In 2016, he was conferred a Knight of Grace of the Order of Saint John (KStJ).

Wong is a Fellow of the Australian Institute of Company Directors (FAICD). In 2025, he received an honorary doctorate from the University of Cambodia.

== Personal life ==
Wong has kept the links between Australia and Brunei, even to the extent that there have been ties between him and the royalty of Brunei. According to news reports, his daughter Ida Wong Taylor, who is a commercial banker, has been mentioned in regard to an incident involving Kevin Foley at the Royale Lounge Bar in Adelaide on 2 April 2011.
