= Residential Design Codes (Western Australia) =

Residential development standards used in Western Australia

The Residential Design Codes (R-Codes) provide uniform residential development standards across all Western Australian local government areas. The R-Codes where first gazetted in 1985 with four subsequent editions published in 1991, 2002, 2008 and 2019. The codes are prepared by the Department of Planning, Lands and Heritage for the Western Australian Planning Commission and implemented via reference in local planning schemes. The R-Codes primarily control residential development by limiting the number of dwellings per site area.

== Background ==
During the nineteenth to mid-twentieth century residential development in Western Australia was regulated via local government by-laws and development standards under town planning schemes. This led to considerable variation between local governments. In 1964 the Town Planning Department commissioned George Clarke and Donald Gazzard to prepare a uniform residential code known as the “General Residential Codes” (also the GR Codes) which was gazetted in 1966. These codes improved matters, but were still implemented via incorporation into local planning schemes which allowed local governments to vary provisions. Ultimately the codes did not lead to the level of uniformity desired.

Following a series of reviews, a new Residential Planning Code was gazetted in 1985 as a State Planning Policy. This code was incorporated into all local planning schemes via reference and applied uniformly, allowing the state government to update the codes periodically. A performance-based assessment pathway was introduced in 2002.

== See also ==
- ResCode (Victoria)
- Green Street Joint Venture
