= David O'Loughlin (politician) =

Australian mayor

Mayor of Prospect
- Incumbent
- Assumed office November 2006

President of the Australian Local Government Association
- In office November 2016 – 2020

Personal details
- Born: Port Pirie, South Australia
- Party: Australian Labor Party
- Education: University of Adelaide; University of South Australia
- Profession: Architect, project manager, politician

David O'Loughlin is an Australian politician who is the mayor of Prospect since 2006 and president of the Australian Local Government Association 2016 to 2020.

== Early life and education ==
Originally from Port Pirie, he studied architecture at the University of Adelaide and completed a Graduate Diploma in Project Management at the University of South Australia.

== Career ==
Professionally qualified as a Project Manager, O'Loughlin was an Executive Manager at Built Environs and State Manager at Badge Construction. O'Loughlin joined the public sector from 2008 as Projects Director in Housing SA and became Director Major Projects in Renewal SA in 2012. He won 34 industry awards over five years in government, including the $48 million UNO Apartments project on Waymouth Street. Since August 2017, he has been a Commissioner of the South Australian Development Assessment Commission.

O'Loughlin was elected as a Ward Councillor for the City of Prospect in 2003 and was on many Council committees before being elected as Mayor of the City of Prospect in November 2006 and re-elected in 2010 and 2014. Elected to the State Executive of the Local Government Association (LGA) in December 2006, O'Loughlin served as vice president of the LGA for four years. He also served as the Chair of the Metropolitan Local Government Group from 2009 to 2011. From 2013 to 2015 he served as the President of the South Australian LGA. In November 2016 he was elected President of the Australian Local Government Association and was the sector's representative on COAG.

O'Loughlin took leave from his position as Prospect Mayor in March 2014 to focus on his campaign for the South Australian House of Assembly seat of Adelaide. He ran for the 2014 state election for Labor and finished with a two-party preferred vote of 47.6 percent, an increase of 1.8 percent against incumbent Liberal MP Rachel Sanderson.
