= Stephen Yarwood =

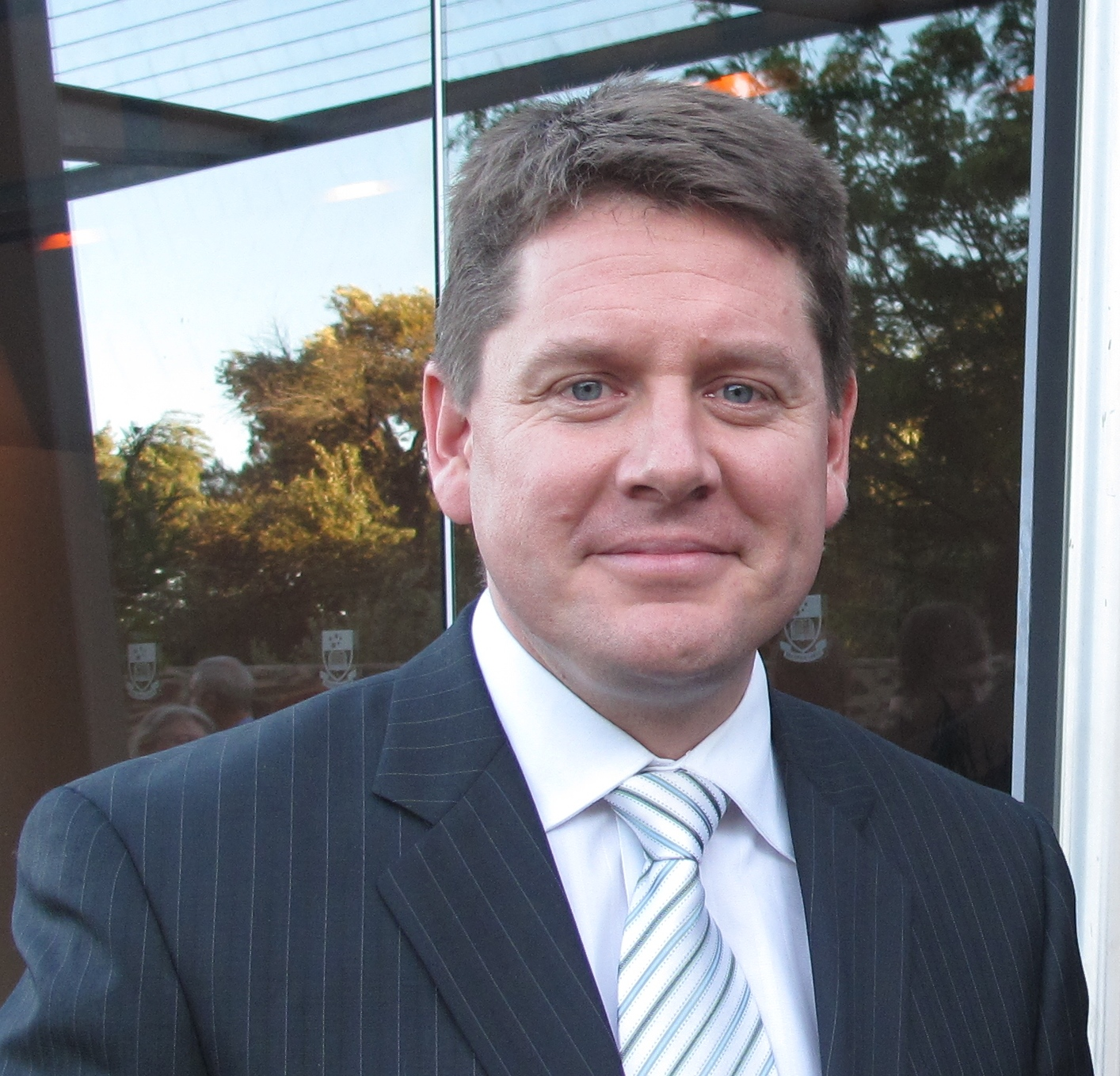
- Stephen Yarwood in November 2010

Lord Mayor of Adelaide
- In office November 2010 – 18 November 2014
- Deputy: David Plumridge; Michael Llewellyn-Smith; Natasha Malani
- Preceded by: Michael Harbison
- Succeeded by: Martin Haese

Personal details
- Born: Stephen Yarwood; 23 March 1971 (age 55)

Stephen Yarwood (born 23 March 1971) is an Australian urban futurist and the former lord mayor of the City of Adelaide in South Australia, serving from 2010 to 2014.

Yarwood became a central ward councillor in the City of Adelaide in 2007, and in 2008 was elected to the position of deputy lord mayor. In 2010 he won the mayoral election. Elected at 39 years old, Yarwood remains the youngest lord mayor in the city's history.

== Early life and education ==
Yarwood was born in Whyalla, South Australia. After moving to Adelaide, he attended Norwood Morialta High School and graduated from the University of South Australia in 1993 with a Bachelor of Arts (Planning), later completing Graduate Diplomas in Regional & Urban Planning and Environmental Studies and an MBA from Masters of Business Administration from the University of Adelaide.

== Early career ==
Yarwood worked in South Australian State Government as an urban planner, was the research officer to the Environment, Resources and Development Committee of the South Australian Parliament and the principal planner at the City of Playford.

Yarwood was the recipient of a Multi-Function Polis Scholarship to study "Future Cities" in Japan's Science and Technology City Tsukuba in 2002 and attended Aarhus Business School Summer School program in Denmark in 2009. He has researched city planning and governance, worked and/or led delegations to Canada, USA, Scandinavia/Europe, the Middle East, Japan, Thailand, Singapore, China, India and New Zealand.

== Adelaide City Council ==
Yarwood was elected as central ward councillor to the Adelaide City Council in 2007 and served as Deputy Lord Mayor from 2008 to 2009. Yarwood won the Lord Mayoral election in 2010, with 3169 votes, 884 votes ahead of Francis Wong. During his time as Lord Mayor, Yarwood oversaw the redevelopment of the Rundle Mall and Victoria Square, the implementation of the citywide Wi-Fi network and CISCO smart cities agreement, the first sister city agreement in 30 years with Qingdao, China, environmental initiatives including accelerated trees plantings and an ambitious carbon neutral action plan, integrated transport vision that included significant walking and cycling infrastructure and hosting the premier cycling conference "VeloCity Global".

Yarwood was the Chair of the Adelaide Park Lands Authority, Dual Chair of the Reconciliation Committee and also sat on the Capital City Committee and Rundle Mall Management Authority.

== Later career ==
In 2015, Yarwood founded city^{2050},'a consultancy specialising in long term transformative strategic planning' for cities. city^{2050} provides training, speaking and consulting services, working with "cities, states, nations, corporations and communities".

In 2016, Yarwood was announced as a founding member of the Airbnb Mayoral Advisory Board, alongside three former mayors from the U.S. and Italy. The aims to strengthen Airbnb's partnerships with cities worldwide; reviewing policies, providing feedback on upcoming Airbnb products and initiatives, and providing Airbnb with 'valuable insights gained from years leading some of the world's greatest cities'.
