= Michael Armitage (politician) =

Australian politician (born 1949)

Michael Harry Armitage (born 3 May 1949) is an Australian former politician. He was a Liberal Party member of the South Australian House of Assembly between 1989 and 2002, representing the electorate of Adelaide.

== Education ==
Armitage was educated at St. Ignatius College and the University of Adelaide, where he studied medicine. He worked as a doctor before entering politics.

== Political career ==
Armitage won the seat of Adelaide the 1989 state election, becoming the first non-Labor member to win it in its single-member incarnation.

Armitage was comfortably reelected in the 1993 election as the Liberals swept to power in a landslide. Over the next nine years he held portfolios including Minister for Health, Minister for Aboriginal Affairs, Minister for Disability Services, Minister for Government Enterprises, Minister for Administrative and Information Services, Minister for Government Enterprises, Minister Assisting the Premier for Information Economy, Minister for Government Enterprises and Minister for Information Economy.

In 1994, Armitage was criticised for a racial slur he used in parliament. On 22 November Armitage used the metaphor "n**ger in the woodpile" during question time, in response to a question about the Modbury Hospital by then-opposition leader Mike Rann. Rann immediately criticised Armitage for his use of the word, and a number of aboriginal groups demanded his removal from the ministry.

Armitage was narrowly reelected in 1997. After a redistribution ahead of the 2002 election made Adelaide even more marginal, Armitage tried to transfer to Bragg, the safest Liberal seat in Adelaide. He was soundly defeated for Liberal preselection by Vickie Chapman. Meanwhile, his replacement as Liberal candidate in Adelaide, Deputy Mayor Michael Harbison, lost the seat to former Mayor Jane Lomax-Smith.

== Post-politics ==
In 2005, he was appointed as CEO of Private Healthcare Australia (formerly the Australian Health Insurance Association) and remained in that role until October 2015.

Parliament of South Australia
Preceded by Mike Duigan	Member for Adelaide; 1989–2002	Succeeded by Jane Lomax-Smith
