= Woodroofe =

South Australian soft drink company

Woodroofe (often shortened to Woodies) is a brand of soft drinks in South Australia.

== History ==
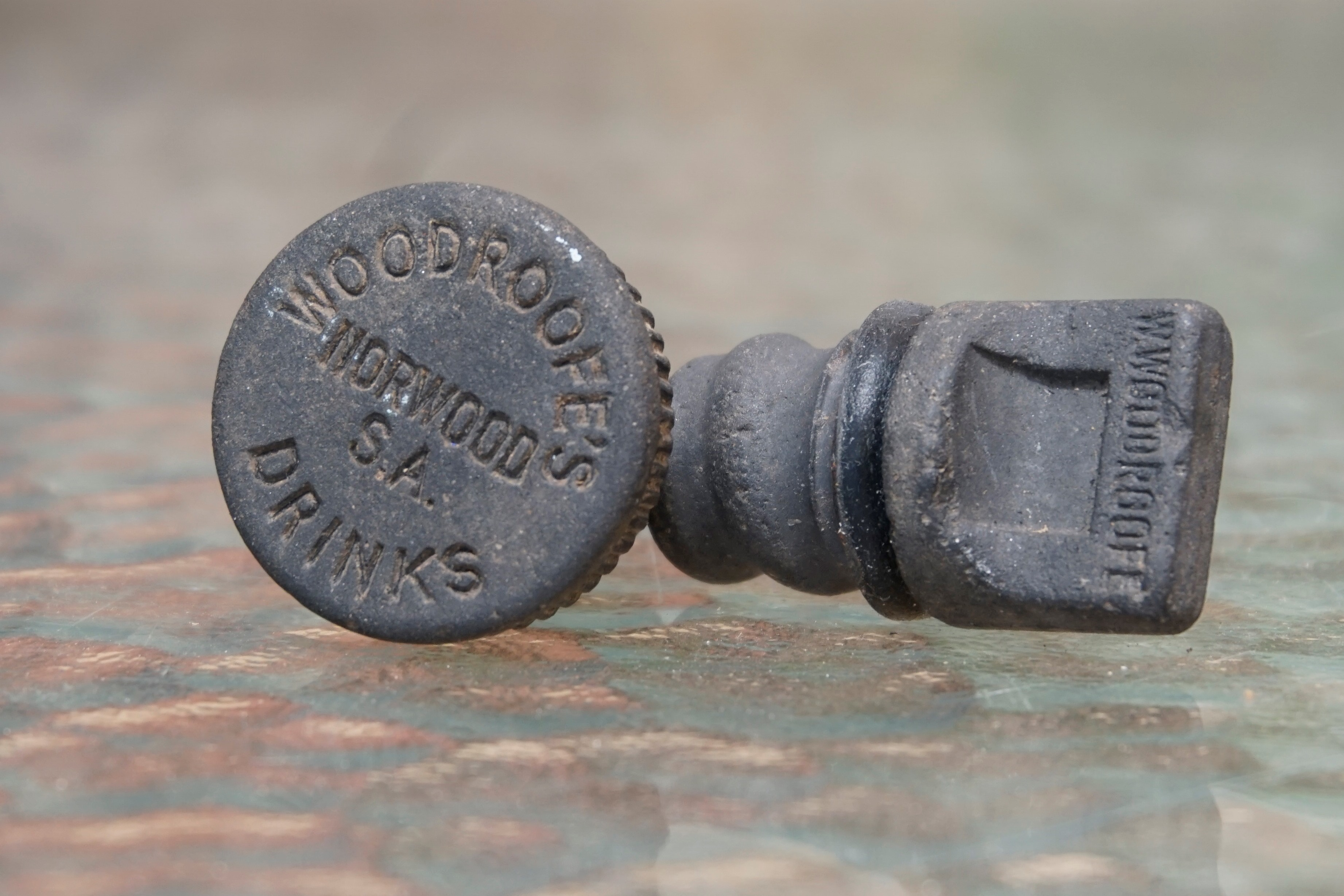
Stoppers for Woodroofe's soft drinks

William Woodroofe and to a lesser extent, Bruce Randall, founded the business in 1878 in Norwood, South Australia. The factory was sited at a natural spring, which was the source of water for the firm's products. Woodroofe's innovative products and aggressive marketing saw them operate successfully as a regional independent soft drink producer for over a century. The most popular flavour was, and continues to be, lemonade.

In the 1970s, the growth of national producers and increasing popularity of international brands (particularly Coca-Cola) resulted in Woodroofe facing increasing challenges to its market position. The business was family owned until it was acquired by Adelaide businessmen Michael Harbison and Tim Hartley. They reinvigorated the business, including introducing new flavours, such as fruit flavoured mineral water. Briefly, they bottled RC Cola under licence.

Kathy and Michael Harbison (later Lord Mayor of Adelaide) co-purchased Woodroofe in the 1980s, along with the Hartley family, and Kathy Harbison was involved in the day-to-day running of the operations.

In 1983, they floated the business as a public company on the Adelaide Stock Exchange. Subsequently, the South Australian Brewing Company purchased the soft drink manufacturing activities and they onsold the business to Cadbury Schweppes, who closed the historic Norwood factory and relocated production to their facility at nearby Payneham. In 2009, Schweppes was acquired by Asahi.

Today, Woodroofe soft drinks continue to be marketed as a regional brand in South Australia.

Asahi/Schweppes closed the Payneham operations in 2016 and shifted their production to Melbourne (Tullamarine) and Perth.

== Flavours ==
Woodroofe's best known and most popular flavour is lemonade, advertised for many years with the slogan and jingle "Still the best lemonade made". Generations of South Australian mothers gave their sick children boiled Woodroofe's lemonade under medical advice.

Other distinctive proprietary flavours included "Big Sars" sarsaparilla and "Sno-Top" (a brown vanilla-flavoured cream soda). In addition, Woodroofe's produces a range of fruit flavours. A former flavour that is no longer manufactured is Kola Beer. However, a similar product is now produced by Bickford's. Woodroofe's also made a chocolate flavoured carbonated soft drink (Woc) in the 1960s.

== See also ==
- South Australian food and drink
