= Michael Harbison =

Australian politician

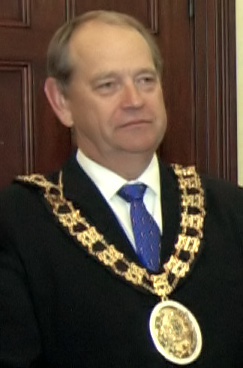
- Harbison in 2005

78th Lord Mayor of Adelaide
- In office 12 May 2003 – 13 November 2010
- Deputy: Bruno Ventura; Richard Hayward; Creston Magasdi; Susan Clearihan; Stephen Yarwood; Michael Henningsen
- Preceded by: Alfred Huang
- Succeeded by: Stephen Yarwood

Personal details
- Born: June 16, 1953 (age 73)

Michael John Henry Harbison was the Lord Mayor of Adelaide, South Australia from 2003 to 2010. Harbison is the longest serving Lord Mayor and the first to serve two consecutive full terms in 15 years.

The Advertiser would later go on to described him as an "exceptionally successful businessman who became frustrated by how slowly the wheels of a council bureaucracy turn".

== Early life and education ==
Before becoming Lord Mayor, he was a successful businessman. Along with Tim Hartley, Harbison owned and ran the Harvest Corporation and the Malcolm Reid furniture chain, one of the city's oldest companies at the time. The two met working backstage at Circus Oz in the 1970s, where Harbison was the ringmaster. The circus was one of the first in the country to be animal-free.

In the 1980s, after their marriage, Harbison and his wife Kathy Harbison co-purchased Woodroofe for $3 million, the soft drink factory in Norwood, along with the Hartley family.

== Local government ==
Harbison became a Councillor in 1998 and in 2002 ran as Liberal candidate for the state seat of Adelaide only to be defeated by former Lord Mayor Jane Lomax-Smith.

Harbison was elected Lord Mayor in 2003, defeating former Lord Mayor Alfred Huang and local bookseller Greg Mackie. One of his most publicised election pledges was to close Rundle Street to traffic on Friday nights, saying the Council should have the courage to "say no to cars".

His eight years in office focused on heritage preservation, urban revitalisation, prudent financial policies and investing in asset and infrastructure repairs across the city.

Harbison oversaw a budget that included installing solar panels on the Adelaide Central Market and installing butt-out bins in city streets. Harbison also backed the State Government's tramline extensions plans, crediting it for "successfully provided an environmentally sustainable transport option for commuters and has also sparked major development interest".

During his first term, he oversaw the rolling out of 50 WIFI hot spots on lamp posts, traffic lights, and under trees. The initiative made Adelaide the first city centre in Australia to be permanently online. He also encouraged Council to install dark fibre wherever new cabling was done to help build a sufficient wireless network.

One of the initiatives Harbison championed in his second term was a free car use scheme, whereby people could loan a vehicle near their home free-of-charge for up to an hour. The City Council allocated three carparking spaces for the first of the share vehicles. "It takes pressure off the city streets with less cars, but also it relieves the burden of car ownership for individual residents," he told ABC Radio Adelaide.

The City of Adelaide Act limits the Lord Mayor of Adelaide to serving two consecutive terms. Harbison was succeeded at the 2010 South Australian local elections by Stephen Yarwood.

== Controversies ==
Harbison became embroiled in controversy during his reign after The Advertiser revealed he had a financial relationship with FiveAA broadcaster Leon Byner. Byner was suspended for eight weeks after Harbison admitted paying him $6000 for media coaching. While Harbison was cleared of any wrongdoing, Byner gave an on-air apology once his suspension had ended.

Shortly before the end of his term, Harbison drew ire for inviting 370 guests to a farewell party on November 3, 2010 which cost ratepayers $40,000. The costs were covered under the "civic events" budget line and CEO Peter Smith said it did not breach the Local Government Election Act. Councillor Anne Moran told The Advertiser: ""It could be seen by people as a waste of ratepayers' money, and I agree".

== Life after politics ==
Three months after leaving Town Hall, Harbison made headlines again for a stoush with the City Council over parking outside his North Adelaide property. He'd lobbied the Council to remove parking outside because it was difficult to enter and exit the driveway. The newspaper said he had purchased the home for $785,500 that October and it was currently being renovated.

In 2024, Harbison was embroiled in a four-month legal stoush over his father's $3 million estate. Harbison's sister, Catherine, sued he and his brother William and they countersued her in response. The lawsuit arose from the death of their father, Gawler GP Dr John Harbison. Carramar, a nine-room, 175sqm Victorian villa purchased by John and Pat Harbison in 1956 was central to the lawsuit. Catherine wanted her brothers removed as executors of the estate while they sought legal advice. A private mediation hearing resolved the dispute, but not before Harbison's brother, Adelaide veterinarian and equestrian identity William, clashed with reporters outside court.
