= Rachel Sanderson =

Australian politician

The Honourable Rachel Sanderson
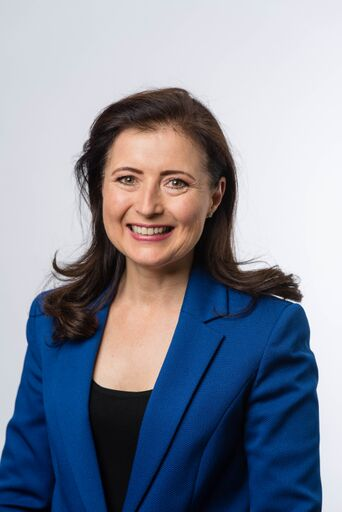

Minister for Child Protection
- In office 22 March 2018 – 21 March 2022
- Premier: Steven Marshall
- Preceded by: John Rau (as Minister for Child Protection Reform)
- Succeeded by: Katrine Hildyard

Member of the South Australian House of Assembly for Adelaide
- In office 20 March 2010 – 19 March 2022
- Preceded by: Jane Lomax-Smith
- Succeeded by: Lucy Hood

Personal details
- Party: Liberal Party of Australia (SA)
- Education: University of South Australia
- Profession: Financial manager; Politician
- Website: rachelsanderson.com.au

Rachel Sanderson is an Australian politician who represented the seat of Adelaide in the South Australian House of Assembly for the South Australian Division of the Liberal Party of Australia from the 2010 election to the 2022 election. Sanderson served as the minister for Child Protection in the Marshall Ministry.

== Background and early career ==
Sanderson's family moved from Melbourne to Adelaide in 1983, settling in Prospect, an inner northern suburb of Adelaide. Sanderson attended St Peter's Collegiate Girls' School.

Sanderson graduated from the University of South Australia with a Bachelor of Arts in Accountancy. She worked for a chartered accountant, a finishing school and then a modelling agency as a financial manager. In 1994 Sanderson established a modelling agency and training school, Rachel's Model Management.

Sanderson sold her management agency in April 2013, citing her full-time occupation as being a member of parliament.

== Political career ==
Sanderson was elected to the South Australian House of Assembly seat of Adelaide at the 2010 state election, receiving a 14.5-point two-party swing on a margin of 4.2 points against the Labor incumbent, Jane Lomax-Smith. At the 2014 state election she suffered a 1.8-point two-party swing against her finishing with a reduced margin of 2.4 points against the Labor candidate, David O'Loughlin.

=== 2016 redistribution campaign ===
Upon the release of the 2016 draft electoral redistribution, Sanderson organised the mass distribution of a pro forma document in the two inner metropolitan suburbs of Walkerville and Gilberton, which aimed for residents to use the pro forma document to submit their objection to the commission in support of Sanderson's campaign to keep the two suburbs in her seat of Adelaide, which in the draft would have been transferred to neighbouring Torrens. Sanderson's position however was at odds with her own party's submission which agreed with the commission that Walkerville should be transferred to Torrens. Under the commission's draft proposal, the Liberal margin in Adelaide would have been reduced from 2.4 percent to 0.6 percent but would have also resulted in the Labor margin in Torrens reduced from 3.5 percent to 1.1 percent. Of a record 130 total submissions received in response to the draft redistribution, about 100 (over three-quarters of all submissions) were from Walkerville and Gilberton. As a result, the commission reversed the draft decision in the final publication. The 2016 electoral redistribution added the rest of Collinswood to the seat and moved the seat's northern boundary from Regency Road to several blocks south of Regency Road, losing a significant amount of northern Prospect. This increased the Liberal margin from 2.4 percent to an estimated 3.0 percent.

=== 2018 election ===
Despite suffering a further −2.0 percent two-party swing, Sanderson narrowly held onto Adelaide at the 2018 election on a marginal 51.0 percent two-party vote. With the Liberals winning government after 16 years in opposition, Sanderson sat in the Liberals' second most marginal seat.

Sanderson was appointed as Minister for Child Protection on 22 March 2018.

=== 2022 election ===
Sanderson was defeated at the 2022 election by Labor's Lucy Hood.

Political offices
Preceded by John Rau as Minister for Child Protection Reform	Minister for Child Protection; 2018–2022	Succeeded by Katrine Hildyard
South Australian House of Assembly
Preceded by Jane Lomax-Smith	Member for Adelaide; 2010–2022	Succeeded by Lucy Hood
