= Green Street Joint Venture =

The Green Street Joint Venture was the final iteration of a federal initiative to reduce the cost of housing through the reform and consolidation of land-development standards in Australia and the sponsorship of pilot development projects. The venture commenced in 1977 as a federal inquiry into housing affordability before becoming the Joint Venture for More Affordable Housing (JVMAH) in 1982, and then the Green Street Joint Venture in 1990. The "joint venture" referred to the various financial, technical and research contributions from various local, state and federal government stakeholders, financial institutions and industry associations. The ultimate objective of the venture was the popularisation of a performance-based approach to residential development in the Australian states and territories. This was achieved through the preparation of the Australian Model Code for Residential Development (AMCORD) which was published in four editions from 1989 to 1995. AMCORD was highly influential throughout the 1990s with all Australian territories having adopted performance-based planning codes by the mid-2000s, including the Residential Design Codes in Western Australia, Victoria Code for Residential Development in Victoria, and TasCode in Tasmania.
