= Bowie Wong =

Australian fashion designer

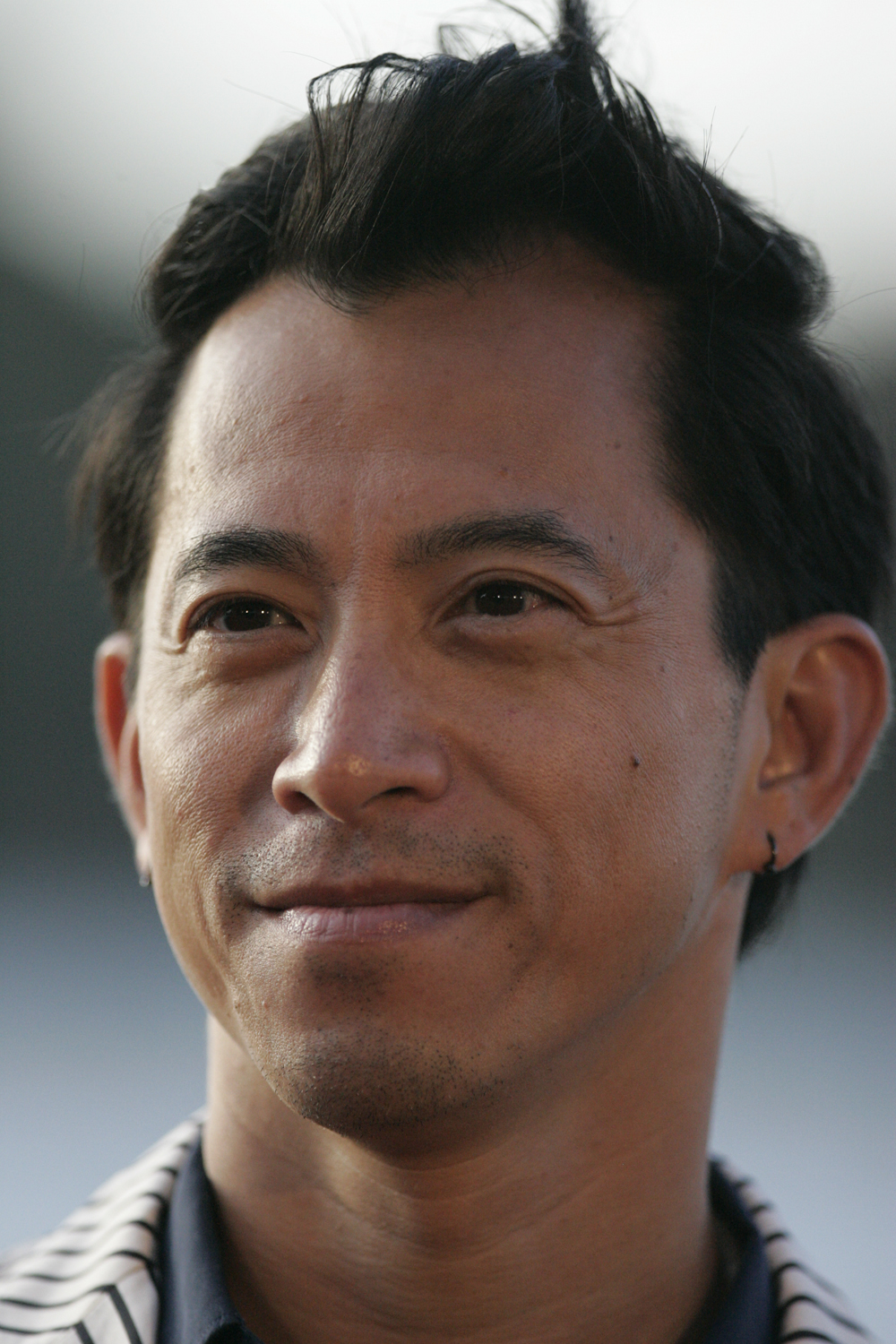
- Bowie Wong in January 2013
- Born: 1969 (age 56–57); Hong Kong
- Occupation: Fashion designer
- Years active: 1990s-present

Bowie Wong (born 1969) is a Hong Kong-born Australian fashion and stage designer.

== Background ==
Wong was born in Hong Kong. As the son of a Chinese opera singer, Wong spent his childhood surrounded by stage costumes, which started his interest in design and fashion at an early age. He studied Pure Design in Japan and Stage and Costume Design in Canada.

While finishing his degree in Canada, Bowie was offered contracts on major theatre productions and international shows including The Paul McCartney World Tour, Cats and Les Misérables. In 1997 he moved to Sydney, Australia where he spent three years. At this time, Wong decided to focus on his passion for fashion itself, as he explains, "[fashion] is a romantic roller-coaster ride and I wanted to be a part of that excitement – [but] on my own terms, so I would not have to compromise"

== Early career ==
In 2000, Wong launched his first complete collection and began to establish himself as a local Australian brand.

In 2011 and 2012, Wong produced a couture collection of unique custom-made dresses and bridal-inspired gowns which was shown at Australian Fashion Week.

He has dressed celebrities such as Kendall Jenner, Kylie Minogue, George Michael, Beyonce and Harry Potter stars Evanna Lynch and Jade Gordon.

Wong has been named a Friend of Australia by Tourism Australia in recognition of his contribution to the Australian fashion industry.

== Bowie Wong (brand) ==
In January 2014, Bowie Wong debuted at Paris Fashion Week, the first Australian-based fashion designer to do so, presenting his collection at the Australian Embassy in Paris. Wong showed at Paris Fashion Week again in July 2014.

Vogue's Suzy Menkes paid a visit to Wong. Coverage included Women's Wear Daily, Agence France-Presse and Australian media. In Paris, press included Melty Fashion, Paris Haute and Flip-Zone. FashionTV filmed backstage and show coverage.

Wong was also invited by L'Officiel Australia to become a couture contributor for the magazine.

In January 2015, Wong once again presented a collection at Paris Haute Couture Week, as mentioned by The Huffington Post, Gypset Magazine and FVM Global Magazine amongst others.
