= George Clarke (urban planner) =

Australian architect and town planner

- Born: Walter George Clarke; 17 February 1932; Sydney, Australia
- Died: 23 February 2005 (aged 73); Sydney, Australia
- Education: University of Sydney School of Architecture, Design and Planning
- Occupations: Architect and Planner
- Years active: 1954–2004
- Spouse(s): Eva Clarke; Krystyna Luczak
- Children: 3
- Awards: Sidney Luker Memorial Medal 1974
- Practice: Clarke Gazzard & Partners, Urban Systems Pty Ltd
- Projects: City of Sydney Strategic Plan 1971, City of Adelaide Plan 1974
- Design: Martin Place pedestrianisation
- Website: http://georgeclarke.foundation/

Walter George Clarke (17 February 1932 – 23 February 2005) was an influential architect and town planner active in Australia during the 1970s. He was one of the principal contributors to the development of the 1971 City of Sydney Strategic Plan, the 1974 City of Adelaide Plan, and in 1965, the first uniform residential development codes in Western Australia.

== Career ==
After graduating from the University of Sydney as an architect in 1953, George Clarke worked as a regional planner under Arthur Winston at the Cumberland County Council in 1953. He would go on to study on an Italian scholarship, before moving to America where he studied with Lewis Mumford at MIT, and worked for architect I. M. Pei in New York. He would gain further experience in London before returning to Australia in the late 1960s and establishing the consultancy of Clarke, Gazzard and Partners.

In the late 1970s, Clarke left Australia to live and work in Bali, Japan, Zimbabwe, Somalia, Brunei and Tuvalu.

Upon his death in 2005, Clarke was memorialised by Clover Moore, Lord Mayor of Sydney, and a plaque installed on Selwyn Street opposite the UNSW Art & Design campus in Paddington, Sydney.

The George Clarke Foundation was established after his death and archives much of his drawings, letters, reports and photographs between 1954 and 2004.
