= Jack Wright (politician) =

Australian politician

- Wright, c. 1984

Deputy Premier of South Australia
- In office 10 November 1982 – 16 July 1985
- Preceded by: Roger Goldsworthy
- Succeeded by: Don Hopgood

Deputy Leader of the South Australian Labor Party
- In office 2 October 1979 – 16 July 1985
- Leader: John Bannon
- Preceded by: Hugh Hudson
- Succeeded by: Don Hopgood

Minister of Works
- In office 15 March 1979 – 18 September 1979
- Preceded by: Des Corcoran
- Succeeded by: Dean Brown
- In office 10 November 1982 – 19 February 1984
- Preceded by: Dean Brown
- Succeeded by: Terry Hemmings

Member of the South Australian House of Assembly for Adelaide
- In office 3 July 1971 – 7 December 1985
- Preceded by: Sam Lawn
- Succeeded by: Mike Duigan

Personal details
- Born: John David Wright; 25 January 1927
- Died: 28 August 1998 (aged 71)
- Party: Australian Labor Party

John David "Jack" Wright (25 January 1927 – 28 August 1998) was an Australian politician and Deputy Premier of South Australia under John Bannon from 1982 to 1985. Wright represented the House of Assembly seat of Adelaide for the South Australian Branch of the Australian Labor Party from 1971 to 1985. Wright was made an Officer of the Order of Australia (AO) in the 1986 Australia Day Honours for "service to politics, industrial relations and the community".

Wright was born in Toowoomba, Queensland. He was educated at Mount Carmel College in Charters Towers, but left school early to become a shearer by trade. He became involved with the Australian Workers' Union in 1942 and was involved with the union in many capacities throughout his life, including as secretary of their Queensland shearers' strike committee in 1945, variously holding every position in its Broken Hill, New South Wales branch between 1949 and 1957, and then as its organiser in Port Augusta, South Australia from 1957 to 1966. He then variously served as state organiser, industrial advocate, president and secretary between 1966 and 1971.

He was first elected to the House of Assembly at a 1971 by-election and first became a minister under Don Dunstan in 1975. Serving as a minister under both Dunstan and John Bannon, he variously held the ministerial portfolios of Minister Assisting the Premier in Industrial Democracy, Minister for Labour and Industry, Minister for Public Works and Minister for Emergency Services. He retired on health grounds in 1985.

He served as Chairman of the Lotteries Commission after leaving politics. He died in 1998 and was granted a state funeral.

His son, Michael Wright, was a state MP from 1997 to 2014 and a minister under Mike Rann.

== See also ==
- 1971 Adelaide state by-election

Political offices
Preceded by Des Corcoran as Minister for Works	Minister for Public Works; 1979	Succeeded by Dean Brown
Preceded by Roger Goldsworthy	Deputy Premier of South Australia; 1982 – 1985	Succeeded by Don Hopgood
Preceded by Dean Brown	Minister for Public Works; 1982 – 1984	Succeeded by Terry Hemmings
South Australian House of Assembly
Preceded by Sam Lawn	Member for Adelaide; 1971–1985	Succeeded by Mike Duigan
