= 2014 South Australian local elections =

- 20 October−7 November 2014
- Registered: 1,155,695
- Turnout: 358,921 (▼0.89%)

	First party	Second party	Third party
	IND
Leader	N/A	N/A	N/A
Party	Independents	Labor	Liberal
	Fourth party
Leader	No leader
Party	Greens

The 2014 South Australian local elections were held in November 2014 to elect the councils of 67 of the 68 local government areas (LGAs) in South Australia. Many councils also held mayoral elections.

As per usual, no election was held in Roxby Council as it is served by an administrator who performs all the functions of a council.

At the close of nominations on 16 September, a total of 1,334 candidates had nominated for mayoral or councillor positions. 45 elections were uncontested, resulting in 73 candidates being elected unopposed. Three elections partially failed, resulting in follow-up supplementary elections to fill the five unfilled positions.

== Results ==
=== Council elections ===
Party	Votes	%	Swing	Seats	Change
Independents					
Labor					
Liberal					
Greens					
Total	358,921	100.00			
Registered voters / turnout	1,155,695	31.99	−0.89		
