= Mike Duigan =

Australian politician

Michael Gregory Duigan was an Australian politician who represented the South Australian House of Assembly seat of Adelaide for the Labor Party from 1985 to 1989.

South Australian House of Assembly
Preceded by Jack Wright	Member for Adelaide; 1985–1989	Succeeded by Michael Armitage
