= Sam Lawn =

Australian politician

Member of the South Australian House of Assembly for Adelaide
- In office 4 March 1950 – 25 May 1971
- Preceded by: Herbert George
- Succeeded by: Jack Wright

Personal details
- Born: Samuel James Lawn; 29 May 1906 Adelaide, South Australia
- Died: 25 May 1971 (aged 64)
- Party: Australian Labor Party

Samuel James Lawn (29 May 1906 – 25 May 1971) was an Australian politician who represented the South Australian House of Assembly seat of Adelaide for the Labor Party from 1950 to 1971.

South Australian House of Assembly
Preceded by Herbert George	Member for Adelaide; 1950–1971	Succeeded by Jack Wright
