= 2010 South Australian local elections =

- 25 October − 12 November 2010
- Registered: 1,155,695
- Turnout: 32.88% (▲1.26%)

The 2010 South Australian local elections were held in November 2010 to elect the councils of 67 of the 68 local government areas (LGAs) in South Australia. Many councils also held mayoral elections.

As per usual, no election was held in Roxby Council as it is served by an administrator who performs all the functions of a council.

At the close of nominations on 21 September, a total of 1,274 candidates had nominated for mayoral or councillor positions. 45 elections were uncontested.

== Party changes before elections ==
A number of councillors joined or left parties before the 2022 elections.

Council	Ward	Councillor	Former party	New party	Date
Prospect	St Johns Wood	Bruce Preece	Australia First	Independent	15 November 2006

== Results ==
=== Council elections ===
Party	Votes	%	Swing	Seats	Change
Independents					
Labor					
Liberal					
Greens					
Total	343,926	100.00			
Registered voters / turnout	1,125,061	32.88	+1.26		
