= Jane Lomax-Smith =

Australian histopathologist and politician (born 1950)

The Right Honourable Lord Mayor The Honourable Jane Lomax-Smith AM JP FRCPA
- Lomax-Smith in 2026

Lord Mayor of Adelaide
- Incumbent
- Assumed office 14 November 2022
- Deputy: Phillip Martin; Keiran Snape; David Elliott; Carmel Noon
- Preceded by: Sandy Verschoor
- In office 12 May 1997 – 13 May 2000
- Deputy: Robert Angove; Graham Inns; Bert Taylor; Anne Moran
- Preceded by: Henry Ninio
- Succeeded by: Alfred Huang

Member of the South Australian House of Assembly for Adelaide
- In office 9 February 2002 – 20 March 2010
- Preceded by: Michael Armitage
- Succeeded by: Rachel Sanderson

Member of the Adelaide City Council for Grey Ward
- In office May 1991 – September 1996

Personal details
- Born: Jane Diane Lomax-Smith; 19 June 1950 (age 76) Walthamstow, London; England
- Party: Labor
- Spouse: Tim Wooley
- Children: 2
- Education: Woodford County High School For Girls; London Hospital Medical College (BSc; MBBS); University of Adelaide (PhD)
- Profession: Pathologist
- Jane Lomax-Smith's voice Lomax-Smith speaking about sustainable city Recorded 9 May 2025

Jane Diane Lomax-Smith (born 19 June 1950) is an Australian histopathologist and politician serving as Lord Mayor of Adelaide since 14 November 2022. Lomax-Smith previously held the position of Lord Mayor between 1997 and 2000. She was the member of parliament (MP) for the electorate of Adelaide from 2002 to 2010, who represented the South Australian branch of the Australian Labor Party (ALP).

Lomax-Smith was born in Walthamstow, East London. She obtained her education in medicine from London Hospital Medical College where she graduated with degrees in anatomy and medicine. She gained experience in pathology at hospitals in London. After moving to Australia in 1977 to teach pathology at the University of Adelaide, she obtained her Doctor of Philosophy degree in pathology concentrating on IgA nephropathy and liver diseases. Prior to her career in politics, she did research work at Harvard University and has served as a pathologist in different hospitals including St James' Hospital, London Hospital, Institute of Medical and Veterinary Science and the Royal Adelaide Hospital until her exit from academics in 1991.

Lomax-Smith got into politics in 1991 after working in the pathology field. She served in the Adelaide City Council for Grey Ward and later as Lord Mayor of Adelaide between 1997 and 2000, making her the second woman ever to occupy this office. As a councillor, she championed issues such as heritage protection, the conservation of the Adelaide Park Lands, affordable housing, reconciliation and the attraction of foreign students via Study Adelaide. Following the 2002 election, Lomax-Smith was elected as ALP's representative for Adelaide in the South Australian House of Assembly and became a minister in the Rann government with several portfolios such as Tourism, Education, Small Business, Employment, Science and Information Economy, Mental Health and Substance Abuse, and Minister for the City of Adelaide. Lomax-Smith was reelected in 2006 although with an improved majority only to lose her seat in the 2010 South Australian state election against the Liberal Party's candidate Rachel Sanderson.

After leaving parliament, Lomax-Smith has had several positions in government and advisory roles such as chairwoman for the Higher Education Base Funding Review, acting director of the Royal Institution of Australia, chairwoman of the board of directors of the South Australian Museum, and also chaired other organisations such as the Don Dunstan Foundation and the Australian Federation of Friends of Museums. She rejoined the ranks of local government in 2022 by being elected as the Lord Mayor of Adelaide for a second term after defeating former senator Rex Patrick as well as current Lord Mayor Sandy Verschoor. In 2025, she announced that she would seek re-election as Lord Mayor at the next council election.

== Early life and education ==
Jane Diane Lomax-Smith was born on 19 June 1950 in Walthamstow, East London, United Kingdom, to Olive Martha Lomax and Francis George, into a working-class family. Her father worked as a carpenter and her mother as a hairdresser. During her childhood, she assisted in her mother's hairdressing business. She later stated that she developed an early interest in pathology during her medical training, noting its academic demands compared with other medical specialties of the period. While living in London, she also participated in voluntary activities, including assisting with community services for older residents and teaching swimming at a local orphanage while still a student.

Lomax-Smith attended Woodford County High School for Girls from 1961 to 1968. She was the first member of her family to continue formal education beyond the age of 13. She subsequently received a grant to study medicine at London Hospital Medical College in Whitechapel. During her studies, she undertook teaching duties in embryology and histology. She completed a Bachelor of Science (Honours) in Human Anatomy in 1971, followed by a Bachelor of Medicine and Bachelor of Surgery and an additional Bachelor of Science (Honours) in 1974. She later worked as a registrar and houseman at the Royal Postgraduate Medical School in Hammersmith and the London Hospital.

After demonstrating clinical competence while working at a hospital, she was offered surgical training by a vascular surgeon and worked weekly in a surgical outpatient clinic during her first year in pathology training. She later stated that while she enjoyed clinical work, she did not consider surgery suitable as a long-term career due to lifestyle and working condition considerations. While undertaking pathology training in London, she accepted an academic position at the University of Adelaide offered by a former colleague and subsequently relocated to Australia.

In 1977, Lomax-Smith moved to Australia and was appointed as a lecturer in the Department of Pathology at the University of Adelaide Medical School. She relocated from London to Adelaide at the age of 27 after accepting the position, initially expressing reluctance due to limited familiarity with the city. She was influenced by accounts of Adelaide's cultural environment, urban planning, environmental policies, and food and wine industry during Don Dunstan's premiership, and later consulted her mother before accepting the appointment. The role included a condition requiring repayment of travel costs if she did not remain for at least one year. She continued work in clinical pathology alongside teaching and research at the University of Adelaide, with aspects of her doctoral studies and subsequent research conducted in the United States supported by the institution.

Lomax-Smith undertook doctoral research in pathology at the University of Adelaide, focusing on IgA nephropathy and liver disease, and published academic work in the field. In 1985, she was awarded a Doctor of Philosophy for this research. From 1984 to 1986, Lomax-Smith worked as a research fellow at Harvard University in Boston. In 1986, she returned to the United Kingdom to oversee the Surgical Pathology Department at St James' Hospital in Balham, London. She returned to Adelaide in 1987, where she worked as a senior lecturer in the University of Adelaide's Department of Pathology while also practising surgical pathology at the Institute of Medical and Veterinary Science and balancing professional responsibilities with family life. Upon her return, she also served as a senior consultant at the Royal Adelaide Hospital. In 1991, she left the University of Adelaide to begin a career in politics and work in private practice. During the early 1990s, she worked in private practice as a clinical pathologist and medical researcher, and from 1998 to 2002 managed the Adelaide Pathology Partners clinic.

== Political career ==
=== Early career (1991–2002) ===
After approximately three decades in medical practice as a pathologist, Lomax-Smith entered local government in May 1991, winning a seat on the Adelaide City Council representing Grey Ward as part of a team of ten heritage candidates. The election gave the pro-heritage faction a majority on the 19-member council. Lomax-Smith became part of the faction's inner group, supporting heritage conservation and the preservation of the Adelaide Park Lands, while also taking an interest in planning, infrastructure, cycling, and issues affecting people with disabilities and young people. She later said that her scientific training influenced her approach to public administration, particularly her use of empirical evidence, statistics and data in financial and policy decisions.

Lomax-Smith served three terms on the council before resigning in September 1996, citing concerns about its governance. In her resignation, she criticised what she regarded as self-interest and personal ambition among councillors and argued that the council had become dysfunctional, with decisions influenced by emotion and personalities rather than the merits of individual issues. During this period, debates over the scope of heritage protection remained a significant issue, with questions arising over the extent to which heritage listing and the council's townscape strategy should restrict development.

In 1997, Lomax-Smith was elected Lord Mayor of Adelaide, becoming the second woman to hold the office, and served two terms until 2000. During her mayoralty, the council listed more than 1,300 structures as historic, while she supported initiatives concerning affordable housing, reconciliation and formal acknowledgements of past treatment of Indigenous Australians. She also worked with the South Australian government and universities through Study Adelaide to promote international student recruitment. Alongside her political career, she was Director of Adelaide Pathology Partners from 1998 to 2002 and sold the business after her election to parliament.

=== Member of Parliament (2002–2010) ===
Leading up to the 2002 South Australian state election, Lomax-Smith became active within South Australian political and cultural networks, including associations with the leadership of the South Australian Labor Party during Mike Rann's tenure as party leader, and participation in public events such as the Adelaide Festival of Ideas. She also received support from sections of Adelaide's professional and cultural communities. She was selected by Rann as the party's candidate for the seat of Adelaide at the election. On 9 February, she was elected as the Member for Adelaide in the South Australian House of Assembly for the Labor Party, defeating Liberal candidate Michael Harbison, and securing a 3.2 per cent swing. She was the first woman to serve as both Member for Adelaide and Lord Mayor of Adelaide.

After entering the South Australian Parliament, Lomax-Smith was appointed to cabinet by Rann. On 6 March 2002, she was appointed to the Executive Council and became Minister for Tourism, Minister for Small Business, Minister for Employment, Training and Further Education, and Minister for Science and Information Economy in the Rann government. On 27 February 2003, she was appointed by the Governor in Executive Council as Acting Minister for Trade and Regional Development, Acting Minister for Local Government, and Acting Minister Assisting the Minister for Federal/State Relations for the period 4–7 March. Later that year, she oversaw the Bioscience Precinct project. On 5 March 2004, she ceased serving as Minister for Small Business and relinquished the Science and Information Economy and Employment, Training and Further Education portfolios, and was appointed Minister for Education and Children's Services. In June, she publicly criticised a Commonwealth policy that required schools to meet specified conditions, including flying the Australian flag, in order to access funding.

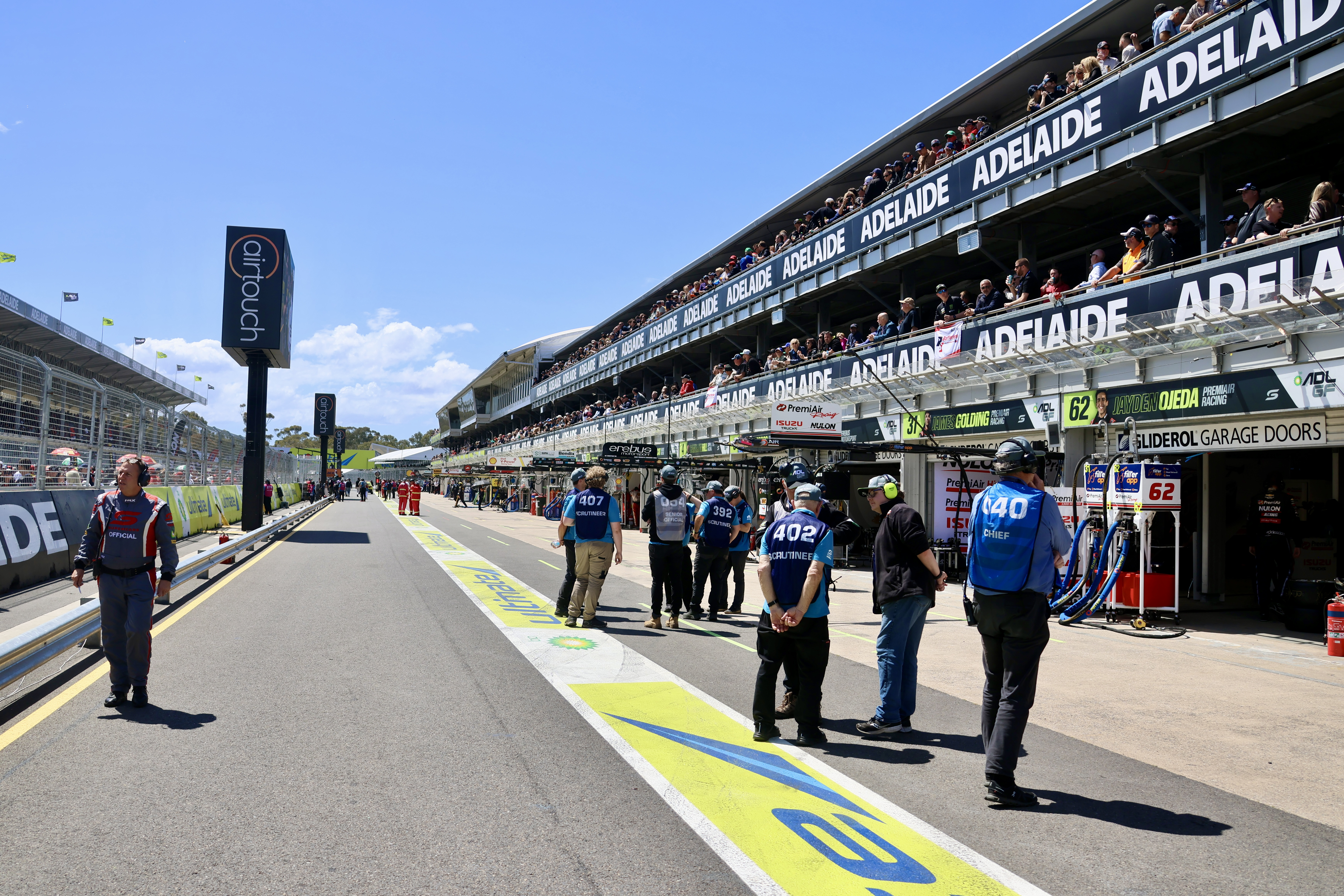
Temporary grandstand (left) and pit lane (right) at the 2025 Adelaide Grand Final

In 2006, she returned to Parliament following a swing of more than 9% and had less difficulty obtaining reelection. In 2006, she won a 60% two-party-preferred vote to keep her seat. She continued to serve in the Rann government as a minister, holding previous portfolios of Executive Council and Minister for Tourism, and Education and Children's Services. On 23 March 2006, she would take up an additional portfolio of Minister for the City of Adelaide. Later that year, she stated that the Adelaide Park Lands had become central to a "land grab" debate in relation to the government's proposed Victoria Park redevelopment for motor racing facilities, including a permanent grandstand and pit infrastructure. It was later reported that she had privately opposed the construction of a permanent grandstand, describing herself as a "conviction politician" focused on acting in accordance with her views.

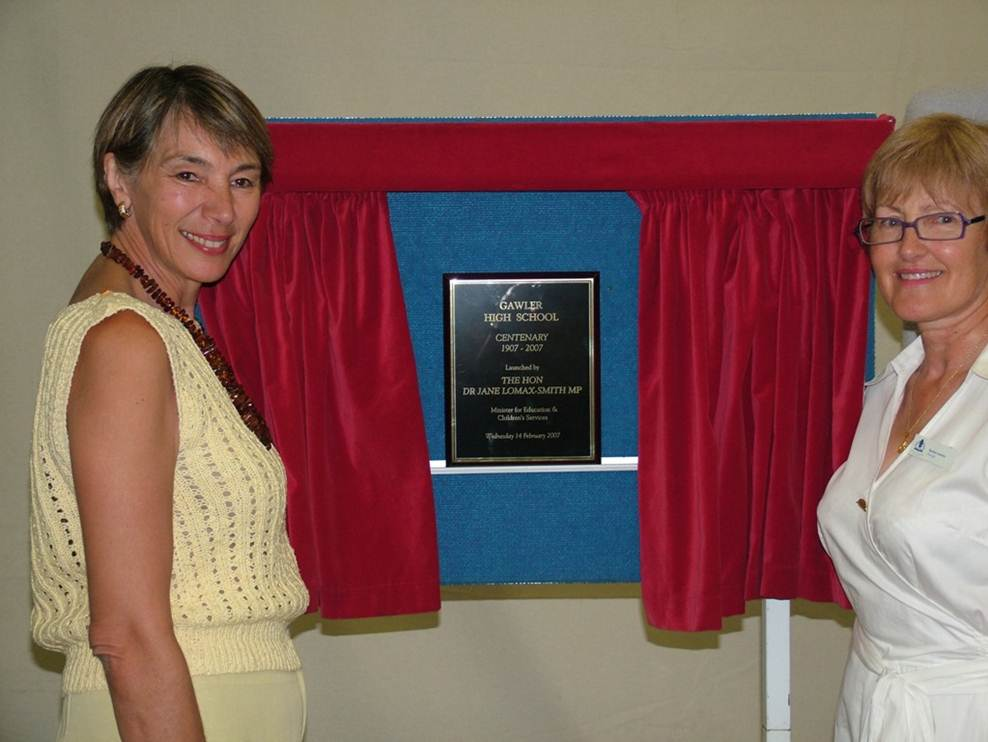
Lomax-Smith (left) at the Gawler High School's centenary celebrations, 2007

In April 2007, Lomax-Smith opposed proposed federal changes to the state's school entry system, arguing that requiring all students to begin school in the first term would reduce flexibility and disrupt arrangements she stated were effective in the state. She later reported that public school secondary retention rate had reached its highest level in 12 years, attributing the increase to reforms to the South Australian Certificate of Education, flexible learning pathways, school engagement policies, and the raising of the compulsory school leaving age. On 21 December, she announced funding for the implementation of the compulsory Year 12 Personal Learning Plan subject in South Australian secondary schools.

In April 2008, Lomax-Smith announced that South Australia would pursue national childcare reform through the establishment of integrated children's centres combining family support, education, childcare, and health services. In July, she was appointed Acting Minister for Employment, Training and Further Education, Acting Minister for Science and Information Economy, Acting Minister for Youth, and Acting Minister for Gambling during the absence of Paul Caica. During the same month, teachers represented by the Australian Education Union protested outside her electorate office during an industrial dispute concerning wages, class sizes, and school resources in South Australia. On 24 July, her portfolio of Minister for Education and Children's Services was renamed Minister for Education, and she was additionally appointed Minister for Mental Health and Substance Abuse. In August, she commented on the recording and online distribution of a violent altercation between two girls at an Adelaide railway station, arguing that media and recording technologies could contribute to negative behaviour among young people. During the same period, she participated in the opening of the APY Lands Substance Misuse Facility at Amata, which provided outreach programs and residential rehabilitation services addressing drug abuse and petrol sniffing in Aṉangu Pitjantjatjara Yankunytjatjara (APY) communities. In December, she defended the continued use of A to E grading in South Australian school reports.

Even when water levels were restored, Lomax-Smith told ABC Radio Adelaide in February 2009 that blue-green algae would likely continue to affect the River Torrens. In June, she participated in the launch of an evaluation of South Australia's Keeping Safe child protection curriculum and related respectful relationships education initiatives aimed at supporting students' development of interpersonal skills. In August, in response to concerns about limited secondary school options in Adelaide's inner northern suburbs, she stated that the government was investing in new facilities and considering expanding capacity at Adelaide High School, noting that earlier school closures had influenced current provision. In October, she announced the establishment of a Teacher Education Taskforce comprising university deans and school leaders to address teacher shortages and improve teacher training quality in South Australia.

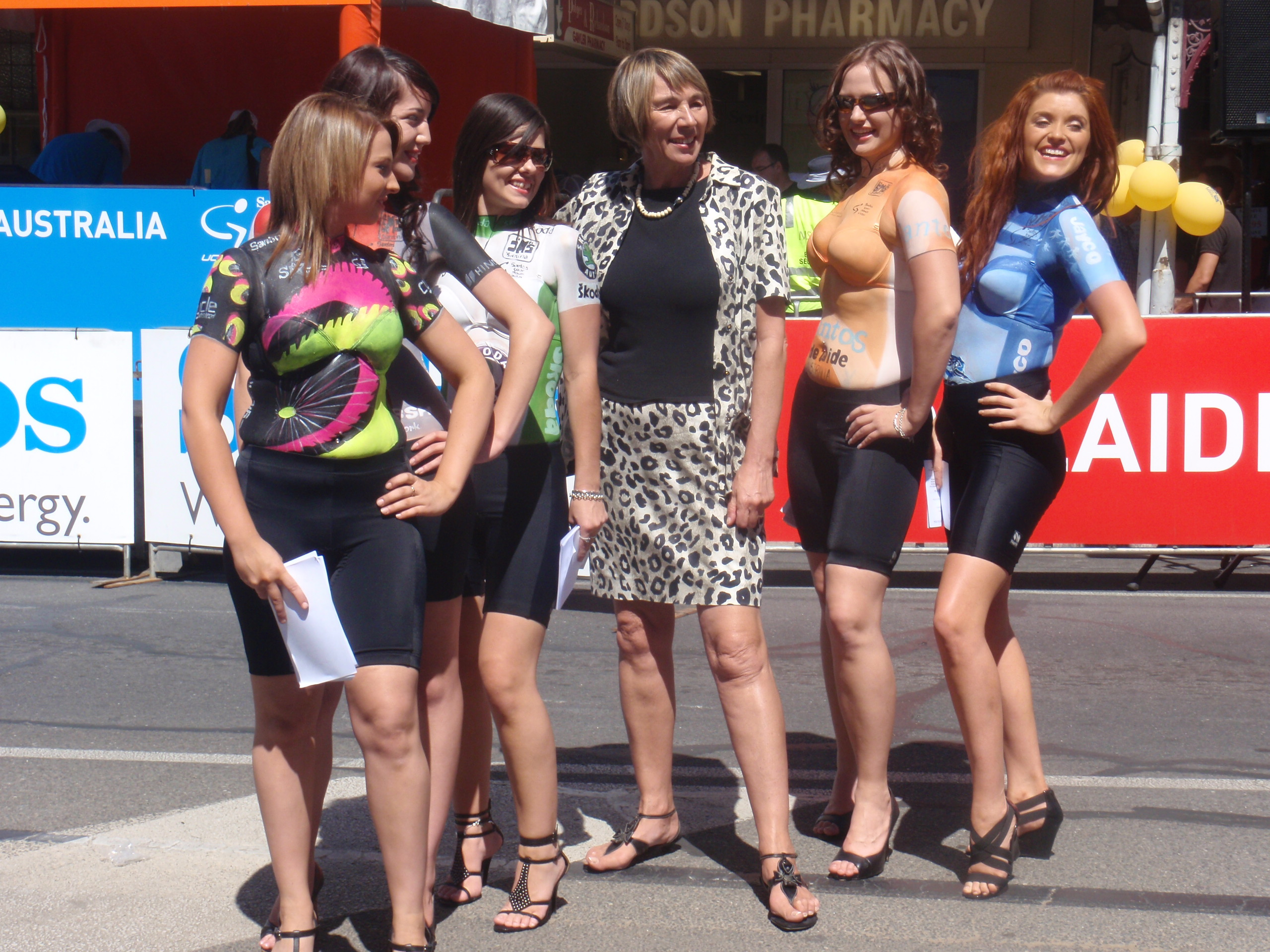
Lomax-Smith (centre) at the 2010 Tour Down Under in Gawler South

Lomax-Smith was defeated at the 2010 South Australian state election. At the time, she was serving in cabinet as Minister for Tourism and Minister for Education. She lost the seat of Adelaide to Liberal candidate Rachel Sanderson following a 14.7% swing, one of the largest in the state, overturning a margin of more than 10%.

== Post-parliamentary career ==
=== Appointments (2010–2021) ===
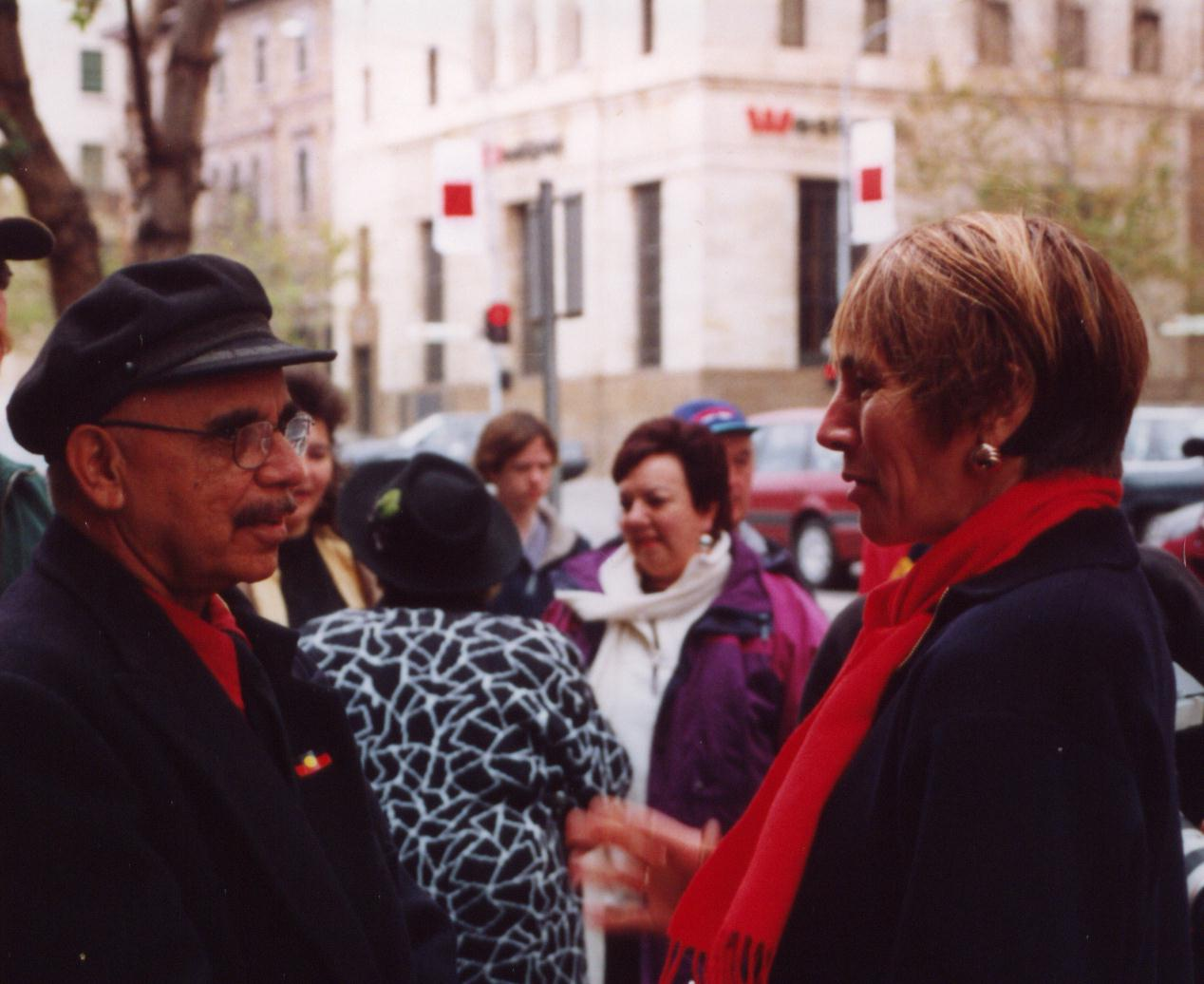
Harold Thomas and Lomax-Smith outside Parliament House, at the 30th anniversary of the Australian Aboriginal flag

After leaving parliament, Lomax-Smith became involved in a range of organisations and boards, often in executive or governance roles. In October 2010, she was appointed chair of the Higher Education Base Funding Review, a federal government review examining university funding models, including incentives related to teaching quality, student outcomes, and participation in tertiary education. Later in November, she was appointed acting director of the Royal Institution of Australia on a part-time basis following the resignation of the previous director, a position she held until February 2012. She also served as director of JamFactory until 2019, and from 2011 to 2018 served on the boards of TechInSA. In August 2011, she was appointed chair of the South Australian Museum Board as part of a governance renewal process. with a focus on strengthening institutional direction and collaboration with the University of Adelaide in scientific research.

On 13 October 2015, Lomax-Smith was appointed by the state government to oversee a process seeking proposals for future economic development in Leigh Creek following the closure of the local coal mine. She later held a series of governance and advisory positions, including membership of the advisory board of UCL Australia, presidency of the Australian Federation of Friends of Museums from 2016 to 2020, and service as presiding member of the Teachers Registration Board from 2017 to 2021. She also served as vice-president of the World Federation of Friends of Museums from 2018 to 2021, and in mid-2020 became a trustee of the Pioneer Women's Memorial Trust. Around the same time, she was appointed chair of the Don Dunstan Foundation, succeeding Lynn Arnold.

=== Return as Lord Mayor (2022–present) ===
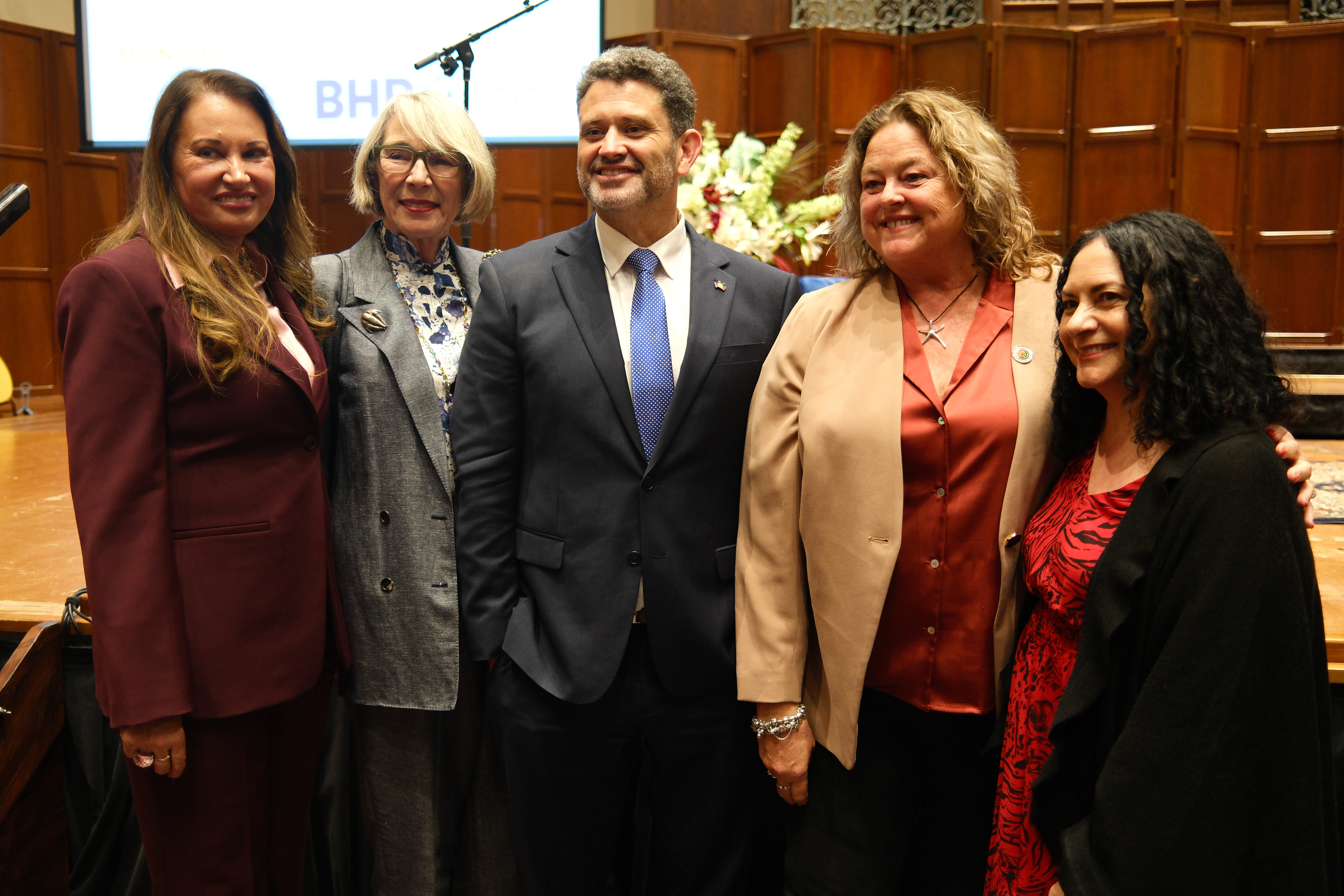
(L–R) Larissa Behrendt, Lomax-Smith, Kyam Maher, Nat Cook and Deb Edwards at the Lowitja O'Donoghue Oration 2026

On 6 September 2022, Lomax-Smith announced her candidacy for the Adelaide City Council election, advocating changes to council leadership and governance and calling for what she described as a "radical reset" of council operations. She was elected Lord Mayor of Adelaide, defeating former senator Rex Patrick and incumbent Lord Mayor Sandy Verschoor, and joining a progressive council majority following losses by several Team Adelaide members on 14 November. During the campaign, she identified priorities including post-pandemic budget recovery, leadership and governance reform, reducing office vacancy rates, protecting park lands, addressing climate change, and encouraging the conversion of commercial tenancies to housing, as well as supporting an expanded city population target of 50,000. The contest was closely fought and she secured election on first-preference votes by a narrow margin. Citing concerns about irregular postal ballots, Patrick disputed the result, which Lomax-Smith won by 52 votes, and called for the Court of Disputed Returns to consider invalidating the poll. Patrick later dropped the legal case after receiving electoral information indicating the outcome was unlikely to be overturned in March 2023.

Following the election, on 1 November 2022, Greens MP Robert Simms raised Lomax-Smith's concerns about incremental encroachment on the new Women's and Children's Hospital proposed parklands location. A few days later, on 15 November, she stated that her priorities included restoring council reputation and credibility, alongside housing, economic development, skills shortages, and park lands preservation. In 2023, Lomax-Smith appeared as a witness before the Royal Commission into Early Childhood Education and Care. In April, she described conditions in Adelaide CBD as being in a "shocking state" and called for improved maintenance and urban management amid public debate about safety and economic activity in the city centre. In August, she advocated for replacing council prayers with a secular alternative, arguing for a clearer separation of religious practice from official council proceedings. In October, she used her casting vote to support a state government proposal for a commercial and aquatic development in the Adelaide Park Lands, breaking a council deadlock despite public opposition and ongoing debate regarding environmental and heritage impacts.

In June 2024, Councillor Henry Davis received a legal concerns letter from Lomax-Smith regarding alleged defamatory remarks made during a council meeting, in which she sought an apology and warned of reputational damage. In August, she called for reforms to Adelaide's heritage protection framework, arguing that reliance on community protest to preserve heritage buildings was unsustainable and advocating clearer planning mechanisms to manage redevelopment in the city centre. Later that month, she was unanimously endorsed by her council to stand for election as president of the South Australian Local Government Association, citing her experience in both local and state government and her capacity to represent councils facing shared policy and governance challenges.

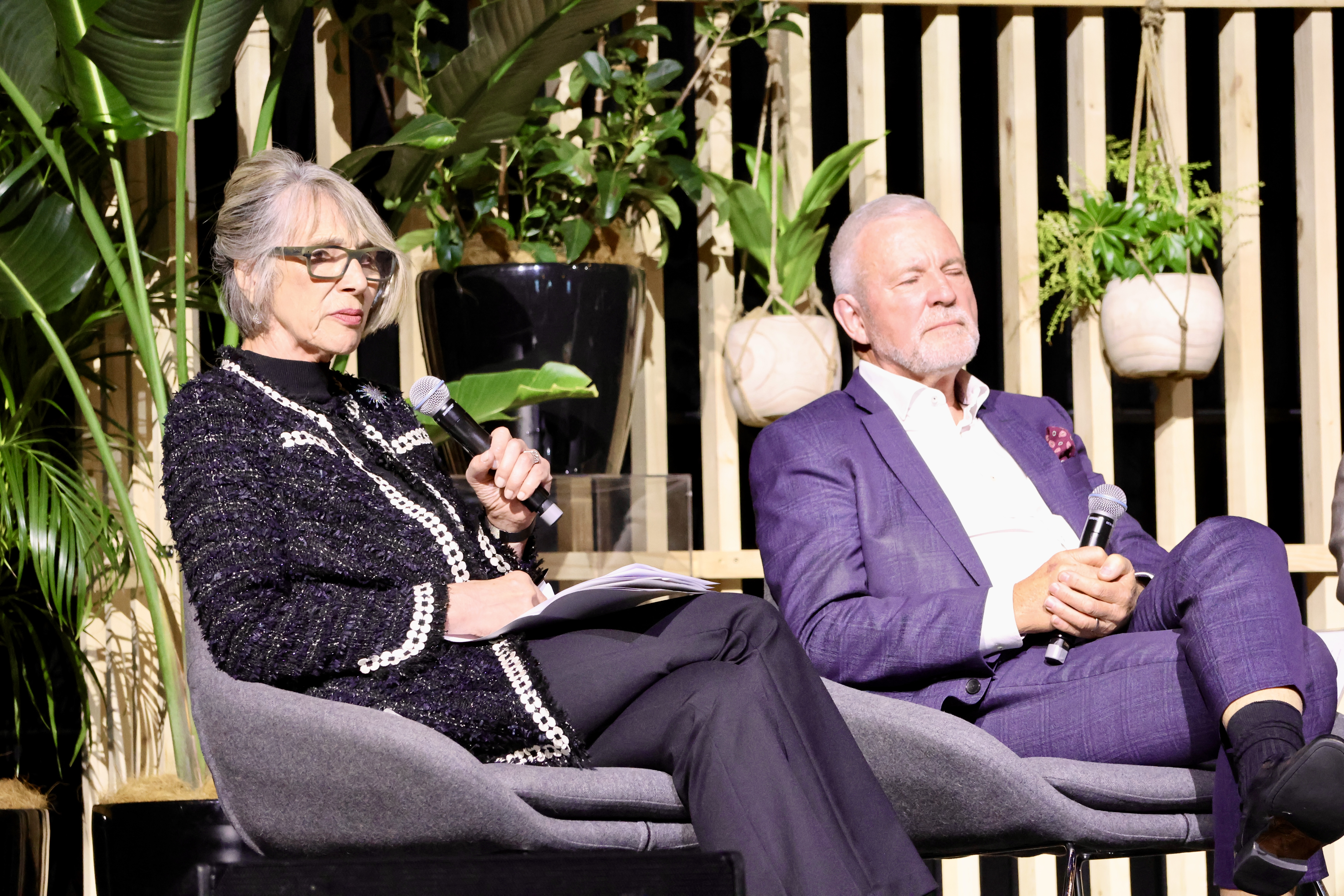
Lomax-Smith (left) speaking at the 2025 Industry Climate Change Conference at the Adelaide Convention Centre

In June 2025, Lomax-Smith defended council decision-making and its continued responsibility for managing growth and protecting the Park Lands, stating that criticisms of the City of Adelaide's role in development were "pure arrogance." Amid ongoing political debate concerning impartiality, election timing, and council leadership stability during the current term, the Adelaide City Council appointed Councillors Keiran Snape and Carmel Noon as successive Deputy Lord Mayors through 2026 during her mayoralty in September. In October, she was scheduled to attend the C40 World Mayors Summit in Rio de Janeiro alongside two other South Australian mayors to participate in international discussions on climate and sustainability.

Following the Adelaide Writers' Week boycott in January 2026, Lomax-Smith described a potential replacement program for the event as "not much more than a thought bubble," stating that discussions with organisers were ongoing but noting that the council could not commit substantial funding without clearer planning. On 25 May, she announced that she would seek re-election as Lord Mayor of Adelaide in the upcoming election, citing the need to manage the city's expansion and maintain council stability following recent construction activity and financial recovery measures. In early June, Premier Peter Malinauskas accused the council of attempting to undermine a major state initiative after Lomax-Smith stated that while she supported major events, she questioned whether the MotoGP should be held in the Park Lands. Amid ongoing disputes regarding tree removal, land use, and heritage conservation, she later reaffirmed council opposition to proposed motorsport events and redevelopment projects within the Adelaide Park Lands.

== Awards and honours ==
In 1985, Lomax-Smith was elected a Fellow of the Royal College of Pathologists of Australasia, and in 1996 she was named a Foundation Fellow in the Faculty of Oral Pathology by the same organisation. The entitlement for Lomax-Smith to be titled "The Honourable" was published in the gazette on 20 May 2010.

In the 2013 Australia Day Honours, she was appointed a Member of the Order of Australia (AM) for significant service to the parliament and community of South Australia. In 2014, The Advertiser listed her among South Australia's most influential people. In 2017, she was awarded an honorary Doctor of Science (honoris causa) by the University of Adelaide.

== Personal life ==
Lomax-Smith married her husband, Tim Wooley, during her time as a research fellow at Harvard University. Together, they have two sons.

Civic offices
Preceded by Henry Jacques Ninio	Lord Mayor of Adelaide; 1997 – 2000	Succeeded by Alfred Huang
Preceded by Sandy Verschoor	Lord Mayor of Adelaide; 2022 – present	Incumbent
Parliament of South Australia
Preceded by Michael Armitage	Member for Adelaide; 2002 – 2010	Succeeded by Rachel Sanderson
