= Electoral district of Adelaide =

South Australian state electoral district

Adelaide South Australia—House of Assembly
- Interactive map of electoral district boundaries from the 2018 state election (Note: The electorate had no change in boundaries at the 2022 and 2026 state elections.)
- State: South Australia
- Created: 1902
- MP: Lucy Hood
- Party: Labor Party
- Namesake: Adelaide of Saxe-Meiningen
- Electors: 28,039 (2026)
- Area: 22.84 km^{2} (8.8 sq mi)
- Demographic: Metropolitan
- Coordinates: 34°54′28″S 138°36′5″E
Electorates around Adelaide:
Croydon	Enfield	Torrens
West Torrens	Adelaide	Dunstan
Badcoe	Unley	Unley

Adelaide is a single-member electoral district for the South Australian House of Assembly. The 22.8 km² state seat of Adelaide currently consists of the Adelaide city centre including North Adelaide and suburbs to the inner north and inner north east: Collinswood, Fitzroy, Gilberton, Medindie, Medindie Gardens, Ovingham, Thorngate, Walkerville, most of Prospect, and part of Nailsworth. The federal division of Adelaide covers the state seat of Adelaide and additional suburbs in each direction.

The electorate's name comes from the city which it encompasses, which is named after the British queen Adelaide of Saxe-Meiningen.

== History ==
The six-seat multi-member electoral district of City of Adelaide existed from 1857 to 1862.

The four-member electoral district of Adelaide was created by the Constitution Act Amendment Act 1901 for the 1902 election from the districts of East Adelaide, West Adelaide and North Adelaide; together with the three-member Port Adelaide and five-member Torrens, the three districts with a total of 12-members covered the whole of the metropolitan area in the 42 member house. The district had four members through to 1915.

Adelaide became a three-member district from the 1915 election, and then changed from a multi-member to single-member district upon the introduction of the Playmander from the 1938 election.

For most of the next half-century, the electorate was comfortably safe for the Labor Party. A significant redistribution in 1983 saw the Labor two-party-preferred vote reduced from 66 percent to 47 percent, transforming it into a notional marginal Liberal electorate. However, Labor retained the seat at the 1985 election, albeit as the most marginal seat in parliament. Liberal Michael Armitage narrowly took the seat at the 1989 election – the first time that they or their predecessors, the Liberal and Country League, had won it in its single-member incarnation. The highest Liberal vote in Adelaide occurred at the landslide 1993 election, with the Liberal two-party vote rising to a safe 64.1 percent. However, it once again became a marginal Liberal seat at the 1997 election.

After the redistribution ahead of the 2002 election made the electorate even more marginal, Armitage tried to transfer to the safer Liberal electorate of Bragg, but lost a preselection battle to Vickie Chapman. Labor candidate Jane Lomax-Smith regained the seat for Labor at the 2002 election as a marginal seat, one of two gains that assisted Labor in forming government. It became a safe Labor seat at the landslide 2006 election on a 60.2 percent two-party vote, before the Liberals won Adelaide for the second time at the 2010 election on a two-party swing of over 14 percent, turning it from safe Labor to marginal Liberal. Despite a −1.8 percent two-party swing, the Liberals retained Adelaide at the 2014 election on a 52.4 percent two-party vote.

The 2016 electoral redistribution added the rest of Collinswood to the electorate, and moved the electorate's northern boundary from Regency Road to several blocks south of Regency Road, removing a significant amount of northern Prospect. This increased the Liberal margin from 2.4 percent to an estimated 3.0 percent. The draft of the 2016 Redistribution Report had proposed moving the Liberal-voting suburbs of Walkerville and Gilberton to a neighbouring electorate, but Liberal incumbent Rachel Sanderson proceeded with a concerted campaign, organising the mass letter-box distribution of a pro forma document in the two suburbs, which aimed for residents to use the pro forma document to submit their objection to the commission. Of a record 130 total submissions received in response to the overall draft redistribution, over three-quarters (about 100) were from the two letter-boxed suburbs, Walkerville and Gilberton, which resulted in the proposal not appearing in the final redistribution.

Although Sanderson suffered a further 2.0 percent two-party swing, she narrowly retained Adelaide at the 2018 election with a 51.0 percent two-party vote. With the Liberals winning government after 16 years in opposition, Adelaide became the government's second most marginal seat, behind only King. The Greens achieved their highest vote in an electorate at the 2018 election in Adelaide.

Sanderson was defeated at the 2022 South Australian state election by Labor’s Lucy Hood.

== Members for Adelaide ==
Four-member electorate (1902–1915)
Member	Party	Term	Member	Party	Term	Member	Party	Term	Member	Party	Term
Lewis Cohen	National League	1902–1906	Bill Denny	Independent Liberal	1902–1905	Hugh Dixson		1902–1905	Theodor Scherk		1902–1905
Lewis Cohen	National League	1902–1906	William David Ponder	Labor	1905–1915	Ernest Roberts	Labor	1905–1908	James Zimri Sellar	Labor	1905–1906
Bill Denny	Labor	1906–1915	William David Ponder	Labor	1905–1915	Ernest Roberts	Labor	1905–1908	James Zimri Sellar	Labor	1905–1906
Bill Denny	Labor	1906–1915	William David Ponder	Labor	1905–1915	Ernest Roberts	Labor	1905–1908	Reginald Blundell	Labor	1907–1915
Bill Denny	Labor	1906–1915	William David Ponder	Labor	1905–1915	Edward Alfred Anstey	Labor	1908–1915	Reginald Blundell	Labor	1907–1915

Three-member electorate (1915–1938)
Member	Party	Term	Member	Party	Term	Member	Party	Term
Bill Denny	Labor	1915–1933	Reginald Blundell	Labor	1915–1917	John Gunn	Labor	1915–1917
Bill Denny	Labor	1915–1933	Reginald Blundell	National	1917–1918	Bert Edwards	Labor	1917–1931
Bill Denny	Labor	1915–1933	John Gunn	Labor	1918–1926	Bert Edwards	Labor	1917–1931
Bill Denny	Labor	1915–1933	Herbert George	Labor	1926–1933	Bert Edwards	Labor	1917–1931
Bill Denny	Parliamentary Labor	1931–1933	Herbert George	Labor	1926–1933	Martin Collaton	Lang Labor	1931–1932
Bill Denny	Parliamentary Labor	1931–1933	Herbert George	Labor	1926–1933	Martin Collaton	Labor	1932–1933
Doug Bardolph	Lang Labor	1933–1934	Bob Dale	Lang Labor	1933–1933	Tom Howard	Lang Labor	1933–1933
Doug Bardolph	Lang Labor	1933–1934	Bob Dale	SA Lang Labor	1933–1934	Tom Howard	SA Lang Labor	1933–1934
Doug Bardolph	Labor	1934–1935	Bob Dale	Labor	1934–1938	Tom Howard	Labor	1934–1938
Doug Bardolph	Independent	1935–1938	Bob Dale	Labor	1934–1938	Tom Howard	Labor	1934–1938

Member	Party	Term
Doug Bardolph	Independent	1938–1944
Bob Dale	Labor	1944–1947
Herbert George	Labor	1947–1950
Sam Lawn	Labor	1950–1971
Jack Wright	Labor	1971–1985
Mike Duigan	Labor	1985–1989
Michael Armitage	Liberal	1989–2002
Jane Lomax-Smith	Labor	2002–2010
Rachel Sanderson	Liberal	2010–2022
Lucy Hood	Labor	2022–present

== Election results ==
2026 South Australian state election: Adelaide
Party	Candidate	Votes	%	±%
Labor	Lucy Hood	10,189	42.6	+2.0
Liberal	Julian Amato	5,084	21.3	−18.5
Greens	Bronte Colmer	3,531	14.8	+1.3
One Nation	Aoi Baxter	2,771	11.6	+11.6
Independent	Keiran Snape	2,002	8.4	+8.4
Australian Family	Dan Casey	317	1.3	−1.0
Total formal votes		23,894	97.6	±0.0
Informal votes		591	2.4	±0.0
Turnout		24,485	87.3	+0.4
Two-candidate-preferred result
Labor	Lucy Hood	16,307	68.2	+12.0
Liberal	Julian Amato	7,587	31.8	−12.0
Labor hold		Swing	+12.0	
