= Abbey Cwmhir Hall =

Coordinates: 52.3313°N 3.3886°W

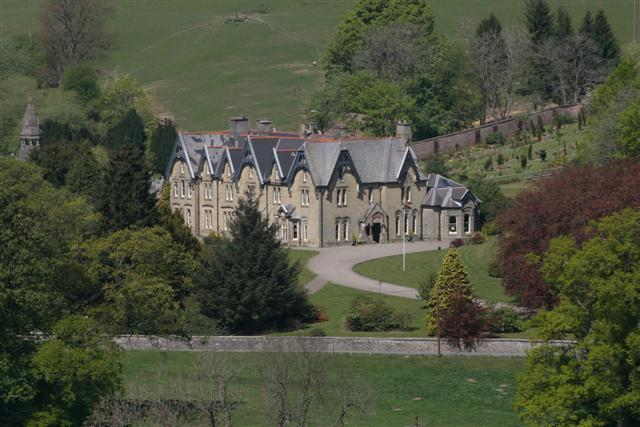
Abbey Cwmhir Hall in 2007

Abbey-Cwm-Hir Hall is a neo-Elizabethan country house in the Welsh county of Powys.

== History ==
The hall was built in 1833 for Thomas Wilson, a London lawyer, on the site of a Tudor style house built c. 1656 for the Fowler family, which was later owned by the Hastings family, Earls of Huntingdon. Wilson purchased the 3000-acre estate and landscaped the grounds, building the hall on a steep south facing slope overlooking the ruined abbey and creating a lake so the village would have water power for the sawmill. Having ruined himself financially in the process he emigrated to Australia, where in 1842 he became Mayor of Adelaide. Eventually the hall and grounds fell into a state of disrepair.

Wilson's house was extended and altered as a Victorian mansion of ashlar, decorated with polychromatic bands and elaborate bargeboards, by Poundley and Walker of Liverpool in 1867–69 for the Philips family. The house was doubled in size in 1869, and they added the snooker room in 1894.

In 1837 Francis Philips (1771–1850) J.P., D.L., of Bank Hall, Heaton Norris, Lancashire, purchased the Abbeycwmhir Estate, which had fallen into a state of disrepair, and did much to improve it. His eldest son and heir, Francis Aspinall Philips (1793–1859), inherited both of his father's estates. Although he lived at Bank Hall, he spent much time at Abbeycwmhir, eventually becoming High Sheriff of Radnorshire. In turn, his eldest son succeeded to Bank Hall and it was Francis' younger son, George Henry Philips (1831–1886) J.P., D.L., of who inherited and lived at Abbeycwmhir. Presumably it was George Henry sculpted the house as it is seen today.

The Philips were an old Staffordshire family who had held manors there since the reign of King Edward VI. Francis Philips' ancestors had been seated at The Heath House in that county since the early seventeenth century, and it is still owned by the Philips family today. In the mid-eighteenth century the family built the Tean Hall Mills and soon became well known as major cotton manufacturers in Manchester. Francis Philips was a first cousin once removed of Sir George Philips, 1st Baronet.

Paul and Victoria Humpherston bought the Hall in late 1997 and have spent the subsequent years restoring it. Their results have been featured on BBC's "Discovering Welsh Houses" and Wales Today, on ITV's Wales Tonight and on S4C.

After several years of being opened for public tours, the house closed permanently to visitors in 2020 due to the Covid pandemic. The gardens are listed, also at Grade II, on the Cadw/ICOMOS Register of Parks and Gardens of Special Historic Interest in Wales.

== See also ==
- Obituary of Francis Philips of Abbeycwmhir, 1850
- Report on the Abbeycwmhir estate, 1847
- Cwmhir Abbey
- Abbeycwmhir
- List of gardens in Wales

== Sources ==
- M. Girouard, The Victorian Country House, 1979, pp. 392, 444
- R. Haslam The Buildings of Wales: Powys, 1979, p. 216
- "Reviving the Gardens of Abbey Cwm-Hir" (PDF).
