= T. P. Wilson =

Rev. Theodore Percival "Percy" Wilson (1819 – 8 August 1881), generally known as T. P. Wilson, was an Anglican priest and author known for his pioneering, albeit brief, work in Adelaide, South Australia.

== History ==
Wilson was born in England, a son of Thomas Wilson, solicitor and later mayor of Adelaide and his wife Martha Wilson, née Greenell (1790 – 29 January 1858), whose sister Mary Anne Greenell was the mother of Alfred Russel Wallace. His parents and his four younger siblings emigrated to South Australia aboard Duke of Roxburghe in 1838. Wilson completed his master's degree at Brasenose College, Oxford, and was ordained a priest of the Church of England.

He was sent out to Tasmania, where in 1845 he accepted a call to take over the newly built St John's Church, Adelaide, but instead returned to England on account of his wife's illness (but see reference below).

He was sent out to South Australia by the barque Derwent, arriving in December, 1847 in company with the Augustus Short, Lord Bishop of Adelaide, and Dr. Hale. He was appointed first Head Master of St Peter's College, at that time held in a small room behind Trinity Church, and also acted as Bishop's Chaplain, and in 1849 incumbent of MacGill and Walkerville churches.

The college moved to its current location in 1850, and in 1851 Wilson resigned over differences with the school's governors. He served for some 15 months as incumbent of St John's Church, then returned to England at the end of 1852. He was appointed curate of Bardsley in 1854, and, at some unspecified date, "a living" near Shrewsbury. His last posting was as vicar of Pavenham in Bedfordshire, where he died.

== Other interests ==
- Wilson is known for at least one work of art, an historic sketch of the Hotel Brighton dated 5 November 1850, the day of his marriage.
- Wilson was a confirmed teetotaler and almost certainly preached on the subject. Back in England, he entered a competition hosted by the Band of Hope, who were looking for a popular novel to promote their cause. Wilson's entry, Frank Oldfield, set partly in England and partly in South Australia, won the £100 prize, and was published to some critical acclaim.

== Family ==
Wilson married Barbara Sophia Cameron (born 1818, the fifth daughter of the Rev. Charles Richard Cameron, Rector of Swaby, Lincolnshire) at Kensington, South Australia on 5 November 1850. They had one daughter and five sons, Charles Thomas Wilson (born in Adelaide 14 October 1851) and Rev. Theodore Cameron Wilson (1857–1940) of Christ Church, Paignton among them.

The similarly named Theodore Augustus Greenell Wilson (1831 – 31 August 1908), a prize-winning student at Saint Peter's College 1848–1850 and State government official, was a younger brother.

See Thomas Wilson for details of other siblings.

Theodore Percival Cameron Wilson (25 April 1888 - 23 March 1918), the "brilliant young school-teacher poet" who was killed at the front in WWI, was a son of Theodore Cameron Wilson (above). His Magpies in Picardy was published posthumously by The Poetry Bookshop.
