= James Hurtle Fisher =

Australian politician (1790–1875)

Sir James Hurtle Fisher
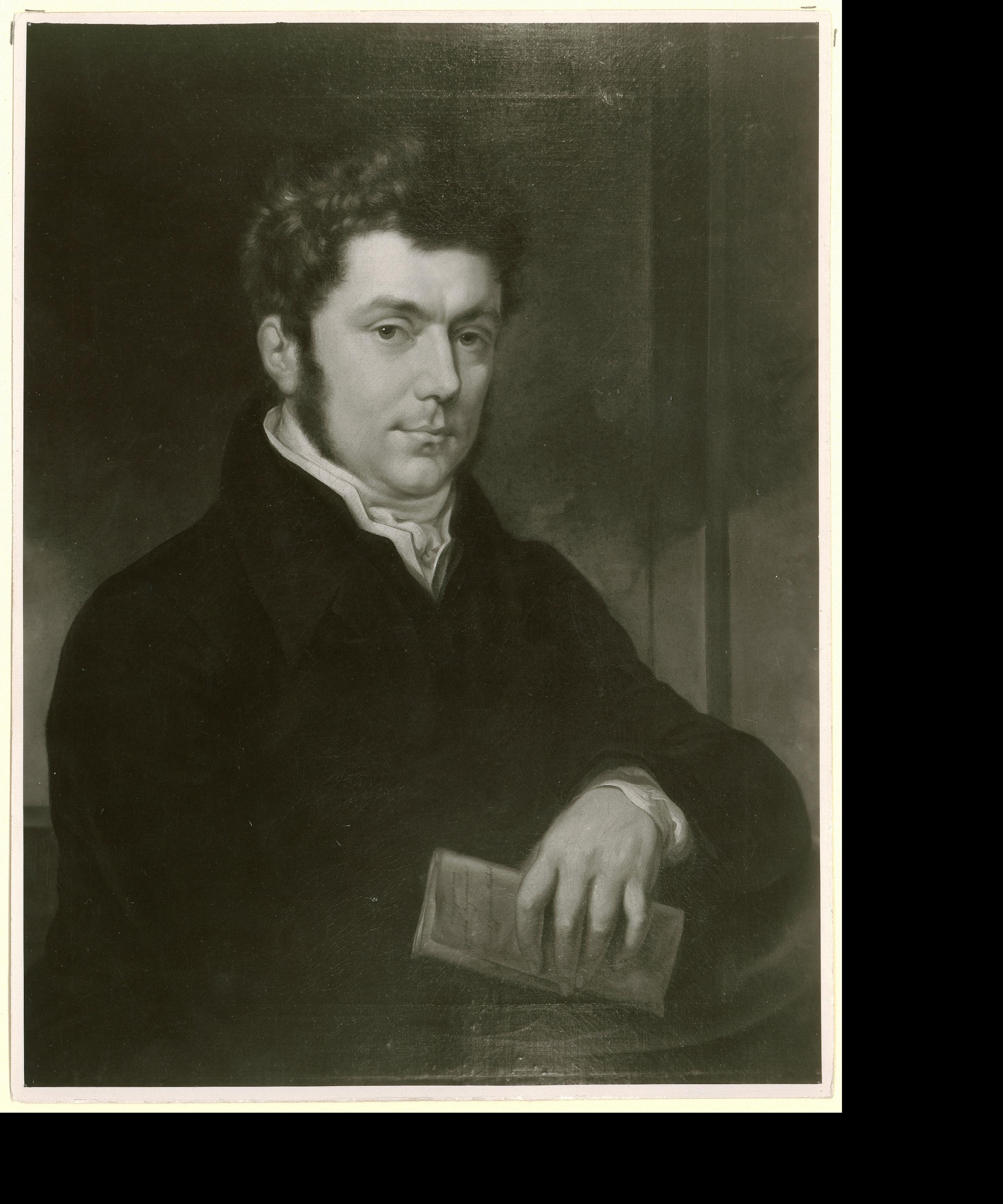
- Fisher, c. 1836

1st President of the South Australian Legislative Council
- In office 22 April 1857 – 2 February 1865
- Preceded by: office established
- Succeeded by: Sir John Morphett

Resident Commissioner of South Australia
- In office 13 July 1836 – 17 October 1838
- Preceded by: office established
- Succeeded by: office abolished

Mayor of Adelaide
- In office 31 October 1840 – 13 January 1842 as the corporation of Adelaide
- Preceded by: office established
- Succeeded by: Thomas Wilson
- In office 9 June 1852 – 20 November 1854
- Preceded by: office established (previously run by commissioners)
- Succeeded by: Joseph Hall

Member of the South Australian Legislative Council
- In office 6 May 1853 – 28 February 1865
- In office 11 July 1836 – 17 October 1838

Personal details
- Born: James Hurtle Fisher; 1 May 1790 Sunbury, Middlesex, England
- Died: 28 January 1875 (aged 84) Adelaide, South Australia
- Spouse: Elizabeth Johnson
- Occupation: Administrator, politician

Sir James Hurtle Fisher (1 May 1790 – 28 January 1875) was a lawyer and prominent South Australian pioneer. He was the first Resident Commissioner of the colony of South Australia, the first Mayor of Adelaide, the first President of the South Australian Legislative Council and the first resident South Australian to be knighted.

== Early life and career ==
James Hurtle Fisher was born on 1 May 1790 in Sunbury, then part of Middlesex, England, the eldest son of James and Henrietta Harriet Fisher. He was articled to London solicitors Brown and Gotobed and admitted to practice in July 1811. He married Elizabeth Johnson on 5 October 1813. He commenced practice as a solicitor in 1816.

== Bound for South Australia ==
Fisher became a member of the South Australian Building Committee in September 1835; in November he was selected as resident commissioner. On 13 July 1836, he was formally appointed Registrar, and, on the next day, Resident Commissioner, under the South Australian Act. This meant he also had a position in the South Australian Legislative Council. His role as Resident Commissioner gave him the power to dispose of public lands in the new colony – the proceeds of the sale would be, following Wakefield's plan, used to fund the emigration of workers to the colony. In power he was to be second only to the governor, with the added stipulation that his powers and those of the governor would be entirely separate.

In July 1836, Fisher and his family left England, accompanying the governor's party aboard HMS Buffalo. They arrived at Holdfast Bay on 28 December 1836, where the new settlement was proclaimed.

== Disputes with Governor Hindmarsh ==
Fisher had been allowed to draft his own instructions — these were not shown to Governor Hindmarsh. Disputes between the two men over their powers had begun aboard the Buffalo and were revived during sessions of the new Council of Government. In February 1837 the Resident Magistrate's Court bound the two to keep the peace towards each other. Disagreement also arose over the site of the city, which Hindmarsh wanted moved closer to the port, and over the slow progress of the survey. Hindmarsh failed in his bid to move the city and the survey did progress. In March Fisher called a meeting of holders of land orders to select their town acres, and the remaining acres were auctioned soon after. Further controversy arose with encroachment of the governor's garden on public land. In August, Hindmarsh suspended Robert Gouger from his office of Colonial Secretary. John Brown, a servant of Fisher and not subject to the governor, was nevertheless also suspended on 11 September 1837. Fisher immediately issued a handbill stating that Brown still held office; Hindmarsh later issued a contradictory proclamation. Tit-for-tat accusations continued, with both parties communicating to London. In March 1838 Governor Hindmarsh was recalled to London, leaving Adelaide in July. This was no victory for Fisher, however: the new governor, George Gawler, was given the combined powers of Governor and Resident Commissioner, effective on his arrival in October 1838.

Fisher returned to law and became a leader of the South Australian Bar.

== Political life ==
In October 1840, Fisher was elected inaugural Mayor of Adelaide. He was again mayor from 1852–54. He was elected into the South Australian Legislative Council in 1853, becoming Speaker of the South Australian Legislative Council (1855–56), and upon self-government, President of the South Australian Legislative Council (1857–65), after which he retired from politics.

In 1860, he was made Knight Bachelor, becoming the first resident South Australian to be knighted.

== Death ==
Fisher died in Adelaide on 28 January 1875, survived by four sons and four daughters.

== Family ==
James married Elizabeth Johnson (1792 – 2 July 1857). Among their children were:

- Elizabeth "Bessey" Fisher (15 April 1815 – 1905) married John Morphett on 15 August 1838.
- James Fisher (1816–1913), pastoralist. Retired to England.
- Charles Brown Fisher (25 September 1817 – 6 May 1908), a prominent pastoralist
- Frances Lucy "Fanny" Fisher (1823–1909) was to have married the widowed solicitor G. F. Shipster, but the wedding had to be cancelled due to his illness; he died the following day. J. H. Fisher brought up and educated his young son. She later married John Vidal James (1820–1897), pioneer settler at Inman Valley and Willunga, later Colonial Storekeeper. They returned to England in 1855.
- George William Taylor Fisher (1825 – 6 August 1859) lost in the wrecking of SS Admella
- Marianne Fisher (5 February 1827 – 18 June 1927), last surviving HMS Buffalo (1813) emigrant
- William Dundas Fisher (1829 – 2 December 1886) married Sarah Melville on 27 July 1859, died at South Yarra.
- Hurtle Eyles Fisher (c. 1831 – 30 June 1905) survived the wrecking of SS Admella to become a prominent Victorian horse breeder who brought Fisherman to Australia, and whose Lantern won the 1864 Melbourne Cup.
- Emily Ann Fisher (1837–1920) married Joseph Palmer on 10 November 1855, died "woodford", Papanui Road, Christchurch, New Zealand

== Memorials ==
James Hurtle Fisher is commemorated in various ways:

- Hurtle Square, Adelaide is named after him
- A memorial plaque exists at Holy Trinity Church (then Trinity Church), of which he was one of the first trustees
- His portrait is preserved at Parliament House, Adelaide

A memorial and plaque near the corner of North Terrace and West Terrace, Adelaide, marks the approximate location of the Land and Survey offices and Fisher's and Colonel William Light's huts, which were destroyed by fire in 1839.

== Sources ==
- Australian Dictionary of Biography
- History of South Australia through street names
- Mennell, Philip (1892). "Fisher, Sir James Hurtle" . The Dictionary of Australasian Biography. London: Hutchinson & Co – via Wikisource.

Political offices
New title	Mayor of the Corporation of Adelaide; 1840–1842	Succeeded by Thomas Wilson
Preceded by Thomas Wilson	Mayor of the Corporation of Adelaide; 1852–1854	Succeeded by Joseph Hall
