= 1863 Melbourne Cup =

Annual horse race in Melbourne, Victoria

- Melbourne Cup
- Location: Flemington Racecourse
- Date: 20 November 1863
- Distance: 2 miles
- Winning horse: Banker
- Winning time: 3:44.0
- Final odds: 10/1
- Jockey: Harry Chifney
- Trainer: Sam Waldock
- Owner: Joseph Harper
- Surface: Turf
- Attendance: 7,000

The 1863 Melbourne Cup was a two-mile handicap horse race which took place on Friday, 20 November 1863.

This year was the third running of the Melbourne Cup. Controversially, two-time defending winner Archer was not allowed to take his place in the race after his nomination arrived in Melbourne one day late. The nomination arrived on a public holiday in Melbourne: Separation or Succession day to celebrate Victoria separating from New South Wales. As a result, The Victoria Turf Club's offices were closed for the holiday and Archer's nomination was rejected for being "too late". Because of this, Sydney trainers boycotted the race leaving only horses trained by Melbourne trainers. The resulting seven horse field is the lowest in the race's history. Archer would have carried 11st 4 lb (71 kg). By contrast, the winner, Banker carried 5st 4 lb (33.5 kg), the lightest weight carried by a winner and third place, Rose of Denmark carried 5st 9 lb (36 kg).

Banker had made the initial running, although Aruma would be in front at the first turn. Rose of Denmark held the advantage for a short while, as both Shillelagh and Falcon found the pace too fast for their liking. Banker sped up to join Rose of Denmark, Aruma and Barwon as the field turned for home, with Musidora making a move. Banker held the inside running down the Flemington straight with a clear lead, eventually winning by a length ahead of Musidora.

Rose Of Denmark was later disqualified as her jockey had not weighed in, although record books still show her as the third placegetter.

== Full results ==
This is the list of placegetters for the 1863 Melbourne Cup.

Place	Horse	Age Gender	Jockey	Weight	Trainer	Owner	Odds	Margin
1	Banker	3y c	Harry Chifney (Note: Jockey Henry Dawes rode under the name Harry Chifney.)	5 st 4 lb (33.6 kg)	Sam Waldock	Joseph Harper	10/1	1 length
2	Musidora	4y m	Denis Fountain	8 st 5 lb (53.1 kg)	James Wilson	James Wilson	2/1 (eq. f)	2 lengths
3	Rose of Denmark	3y f	Harry Tothill	5 st 9 lb (35.8 kg)	Hurtle Fisher	Hurtle Fisher	2/1 (eq. f)	
4	Barwon	4y h	Sam Waldock	9 st 5 lb (59.4 kg)	—N/a	Joseph Harper	5/1	
5	Aruma	3y f	Thomas Pullar	6 st 6 lb (40.8 kg)	—N/a	Gideon Scott Lang	5/1	
6	Shillelagh	Aged g	H. Howard	7 st 7 lb (47.6 kg)	—N/a	Mr J. Morrison	8/1	
7	Falcon	6y g	Joe Morrison	8 st 13 lb (56.7 kg)	—N/a	Thomas Dowling	8/1	
SCR	Saturn	—N/a	—N/a	—N/a	—N/a	—N/a	—N/a	

== Prizemoney ==
First prize £490, second prize £20.

== See also ==
- Melbourne Cup
- List of Melbourne Cup winners
- Victoria Racing Club
