= John Lazar =

Australian actor and politician

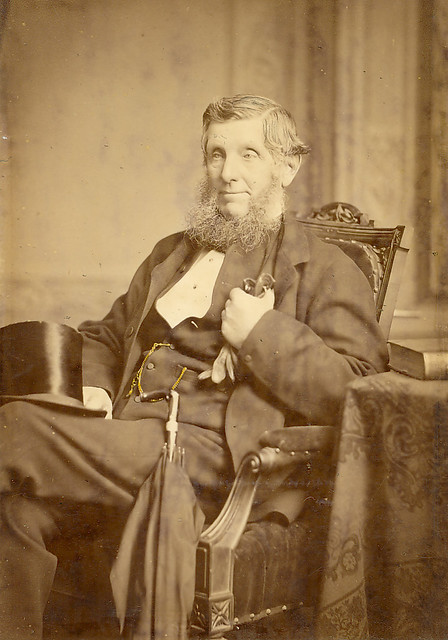
- Born: 1 December 1801; Edinburgh, Scotland
- Died: 8 June 1879 (aged 77); Hokitika, New Zealand
- Occupations: Actor, politician, jeweller

John Lazar (1 December 1801 − 8 June 1879) was an actor and theatre manager in Australia. He was Mayor of Adelaide from 1855 to 1858.

== History ==
Lazar was born in Edinburgh, a son of Abraham Lazar, stockbroker, and his wife Rachel née Lazarus, and may have been brought up in London. He had considerable stage experience in England, and there is no reason to doubt advertisements which reported him playing at Covent Garden and Drury Lane.

Lazar, his wife Julia, née Solomon, and their seven children emigrated to Sydney aboard Lady Macnaghten, giving his occupation as tailor. The ship had an outbreak of typhus on board, resulting in the death of around 60 passengers including three of the Lazar children, and some four weeks were to elapse in quarantine before they reached Sydney on 14 April 1837. He immediately joined Mrs. Barnet Levy (or Levey)'s Theatre Royal company, his first appearance being as Shylock on 18 May 1837. He was well received by both the audience (in part no doubt out of sympathy as a passenger on that voyage) and critics. He served as manager of the Theatre Royal until it was closed perfunctorily by the new owner, Joseph Wyatt, on 24 March 1838, He was then engaged at the new Royal Victoria Theatre on Pitt Street as actor and stage-manager until the end of 1840, when he was engaged to appear in Adelaide at the newly completed Queen's Theatre.

=== In Adelaide ===
The theatre opened on 11 January 1841 with Lazar playing Othello. He had in Sydney been praised for his Shylock, but his Othello was criticised on account of his Cockney Jewish accent and his lisp, and Adelaide reviewers were parsimonious in their praise. Lazar took over management of the Queen's Theatre, taking a lease from late July 1841 but after months of losing money dismissed his company and converted the seating to something more appropriate to public meetings. He did not renew the lease.

=== Back to Sydney ===
The supremacy of the "Victoria" in Sydney was challenged by Joseph Simmons and his (Royal) City Theatre on Market Street, which opened in March 1843. Lazar returned to Sydney that same month aboard the brig Dorset to resume management of the old theatre, which took effect the following May. He left in 1844 following a dispute with owner Joseph Knight, returned in 1845 when Knight sold his interest in the theatre, and left again in December 1846.

=== In Adelaide again ===
In 1848 Lazar returned to Adelaide, now prosperous thanks largely to the valuable copper discoveries at Burra and elsewhere, and became associated with George Selth Coppin, who had established the New Queen's Theatre in a building adjoining the old Queen's Theatre. Lazar and Coppin then remodeled the old theatre, which they reopened as the Royal Victoria Theatre (no connection with the previous theatre of the same name) on 23 December 1850.

This period marked the climax of his theatrical career, achieving a greater degree of popularity than he had enjoyed previously; he even received praise as a comedian. Lazar's involvement in the theatre lessened. He established a jeweller's and silversmith's business in Hindley Street, Adelaide, and became involved in civic affairs. He was elected Alderman for the Gawler ward of the Adelaide City Council in December 1853, filling the vacancy left by the resignation of Alderman J. M. Solomon. He was mayor of Adelaide from 1855 to 1858, and stood for re-election as Alderman in December 1859 but was defeated by Councillor Cox. He was also involved with the Adelaide Jewish community, and a founding member of the Adelaide Hebrew congregation, and sang Kol Nidrei at their first Yom Kippur service in 1848.

In 1853 Lazar and Coppin built the 400-seat Port Theatre in Port Adelaide, next to Coppin's White Horse Cellar.

=== Later life ===
In 1863 he emigrated to New Zealand where he was appointed Town Clerk in Dunedin. He became Town Clerk in Hokitika in 1866. He was also promoted to Country Treasurer and then Provincial Treasurer. He was active in the local Jewish community and synagogue and the Freemasons. He died there on 8 June 1879 and is buried in the Hokitika Cemetery.

== Personal ==
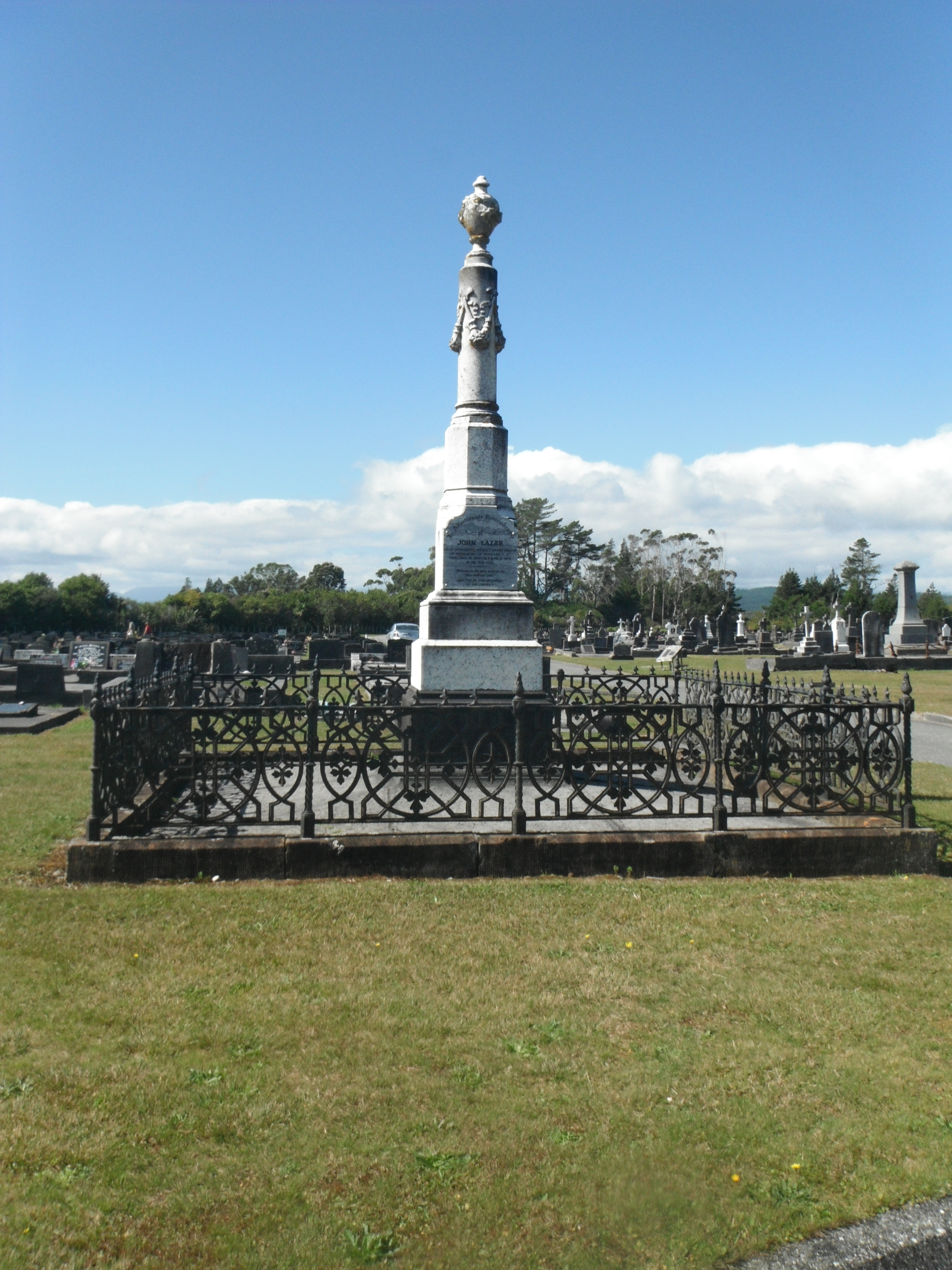
Lazar's grave in Hokitika Cemetery, 2021

Lazar married Julia Solomon (c. 1806 – 26 December 1880), daughter of London furriers, in London on 2 November 1825. Although Lazar was to work closely with Emanuel and Vaiben Solomon in Adelaide, there is no reason to believe she was related to them. Their surviving children (Mary, Lazarus, and Priscilla died en route to Sydney) were:

- Rachel Lazar (c. 1827 – 1897), a star performer from an early age, had a considerable career as a dancer and actress. She accompanied her parents in their various travels until 13 November 1850, when she and violinist Andrew Moore eloped and married at Trinity Church, Adelaide. They had a daughter Julia Moore and a son John Moore, a well-known theatrical agent.
- Abraham Lazar (c. 1829 – 23 February 1893) married Elizabeth Wisdom (c. 1825 – 30 April 1910) in 1854. He was also associated with the theatre in Australia. They had a son John Lazar and daughters Julia Lazar, who married William Hubert in 1875 and moved to Sydney, and Catherine "Kate" Lazar, who married Francis John Goldney in 1873, then Robert Fulton in 1904, lived in Hindmarsh, South Australia.
- Samuel Lazar (1838 – 14 November 1883) was lessee and manager of Theatre Royal, Sydney, 1876–1878? 1875 – 1 February 1882? and died in a lunatic asylum.
- Victoria Lazar (c. 1838 – 8 August 1926) married Simeon Alexander Moss (died 11 April 1913) on 9 December 1885

Lazar died in Hokitika, New Zealand on 8 June 1879. His portrait in oils is held at the Freemasons' Hall, Adelaide. Julia died at her mother's home "Oeta", Queen Street (formerly Piper Street), Woollahra, New South Wales on 26 December 1889.

Political offices
Preceded by Joseph Hall	Mayor of the Corporation of Adelaide; 1855–1858	Succeeded by William Sabben
