= Charles Glover =

Charles Glover may refer to:

- Charles William Glover (1806–1863), English violinist and composer
- Charles C. Glover (1846–1936), American banker and philanthropist
- Charles Carroll Glover Jr. (1888–1976), his son, American banker and philanthropist
- Charles John Glover, known as Sir John Glover, Lord Mayor of Adelaide 1960–1963, see List of mayors and lord mayors of Adelaide (son of Charles Richmond Glover)
- Charles Richmond Glover (1870–1936), last mayor and first Lord Mayor of the City of Adelaide
- Charles Glover Barkla (1877–1944), British physicist
- Charles Glover, plaintiff in Kansas v. Glover
