= Frank Johnson (mayor) =

South Australian politician (1855–1921)

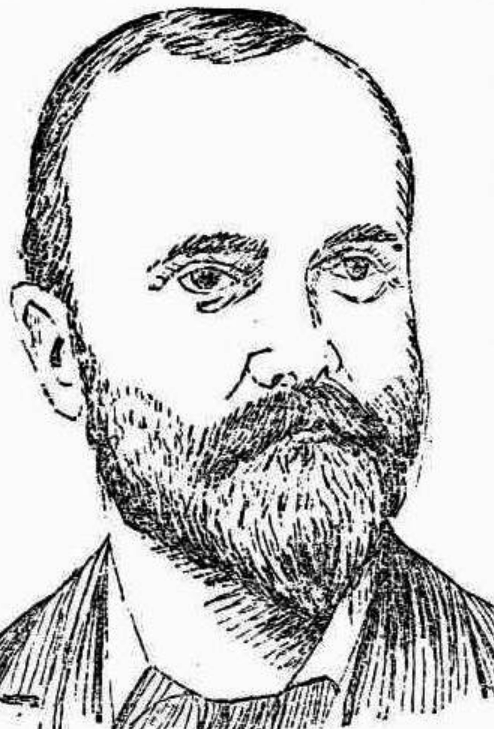

35th Mayor of Adelaide
- In office 1907–1909
- Monarch: Edward VII
- Prime Minister: Alfred Deakin; Andrew Fisher
- Preceded by: Theodore Bruce
- Succeeded by: Lewis Cohen

Personal details
- Occupation: Politician

Frank Johnson (27 April 1855 – 25 April 1921) was mayor of Adelaide, South Australia from 1907 to 1909.

He was born in Hindley Street, Adelaide, the son of Thomas Johnson, at one time member for West Adelaide and East Adelaide in the South Australian House of Assembly. He was educated at J. L. Young's Adelaide Educational Institution, joined his father's boot-making business in King William Street, then became a prominent auctioneer.

He served as representative for the Gawler ward of the Adelaide City Council from 1891 to 1895, a post which his father had also once held.

His brother Thomas Johnson jr. (died 3 November 1904) was a prominent businessman in Broken Hill.

His brother Frederick Johnson was mayor of Charters Towers, Queensland.

He never married and his sister Mrs E. A. Mayfield acted as Lady Mayoress during his term as Lord Mayor.

He succeeded William Ashley Magarey as chairman of the South Australian Football Association

He was a prominent public speaker and Freemason and was president of the South Australian Dental Board.
