= Isaac Isaacs (mayor) =

Australian businessman (1858–1935)

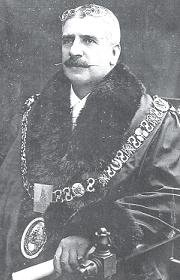
- Isaac Isaacs ca. 1915–1917

Mayor of the City of Adelaide
- In office 4 December 1915 – 30 November 1917
- Preceded by: Alfred Allen Simpson
- Succeeded by: Charles Richmond Glover

Personal details
- Born: 1 July 1858 Melbourne, Victoria
- Died: 16 January 1935 (aged 76) Thorngate, Adelaide, South Australia
- Spouse: Zelinda Rosetta Raphael
- Parent: Wolf Isaacs (father)
- Occupation: Land agent

Isaac Isaacs (1 July 1858 – 16 January 1935) was an Australian businessman who served as Mayor of the City of Adelaide from 4 December 1915 to November 1917.

== Early years ==
Isaacs was born in Melbourne, Victoria, the second son of Wolf Isaacs. In 1862 his family moved to Dunedin, New Zealand, where he was educated at Christchurch. After "about 25 years' residence in New Zealand", he returned to Victoria.

== Victoria ==
In Victoria he was elected treasurer for the demonstration to celebrate the Golden Jubilee of Queen Victoria in 1887. In 1889 he was elected grand president for Australasia of the United Ancient Order of Druids; on his retirement from that office he was presented with a gold medal in recognition of 10 years continuous service on the board of directors.

== Adelaide ==
Isaacs left Victoria in July 1899 to live in Adelaide and take the role of managing trustee of the estate of his father-in-law Ralph Raphael. Ralph Raphael had died in 1890, leaving his financial business in the hands of his partner and only son Henry Joseph Raphael who died in 1899.

== Adelaide City Council membership ==
Isaac Isaacs was a member of the Adelaide City Council for 30 years. He served as a councillor from 1902 to 1906, alderman from 1907 to 1915, mayor 1915–1917, and alderman again from 1917 to 1933. He also filled the role of chief magistrate during World War I, and was chairman of the Finance Committee for more than 12 years.

== Public positions ==
Isaacs was president of the Justice Association, chairman of the Liberal Federation, a representative of the Municipal Tramways Trust, representative of both the City and the Suburban Local Boards of Health on the Central Board of Health, representative of the Adelaide Local Board of Health on the Metropolitan County Board under the Food and Drugs Act, member of the Metropolitan Infectious Diseases Hospital Board and held important positions in other organisations. He was also a land agent and an adjustor of fire claims.

== Personal ==
Isaacs was a football enthusiast, a master of the St Andrews Masonic Lodge, a master of the Southern Cross Masonic Lodge, for three years chief president of the South Australian branch of the Australian Natives' Association, and president of the Adelaide Jewish Philanthropic Society.

He married Zelinda Rosetta Raphael, daughter of Ralph Raphael, one of South Australia's pioneers. She was born in London in 1857 and was brought to Australia as an infant. She died at her home, "Quevedo", 2 Main North Road, Thorngate, on 10 July 1937, aged 80, and was buried at West Terrace Cemetery.
