= Thomas Johnson (Australian politician) =

Australian politician

Thomas Johnson (21 December 1819 – 3 November 1894) was a politician in the British colony of South Australia.

== Early life ==
He was born in Thirsk, Yorkshire, and served an apprenticeship as a currier, then acted as a leather merchant in Bermondsey, London. He emigrated to South Australia on the Dutch ship Fopsmit, arriving in August 1853; fellow passengers were W. H. Sharland (1828 – 29 July 1911), Joseph Grundy and William Townsend.

== Commercial interests ==
Johnson and Townsend opened a boot and shoe shop in Rundle Street, then a retail premises in King William Street next to the Gresham Hotel, with his "Pantheon" boot and shoe factory opposite. He later moved to premises on North Terrace. In 1883 he sold the business to Corris, Craig & Co. and retired from commercial life.

== Politics ==
Johnson was elected to the Adelaide Council for the Gawler ward 1874–1875.

He was member of the South Australian House of Assembly for West Adelaide from February 1875 to April 1878 with colleagues W. K. Simms then J. Darling and for East Adelaide from June 1881, following the resignation due to illness of Freetrader G. S. Fowler, and sat until April 1884. He was a prominent protectionist.

== Other interests ==
Johnson was a member of the City Rifles, South Australia's first volunteer corps.

== Later life ==
Johnson died at his home in Washington Street, Glenelg after a bout of influenza.

== Family ==
He married Elizabeth (c. 1826 – 27 December 1895) in England before emigration to Australia; their family included:

- Thomas Johnson, jr. (died 3 November 1904) of Broken Hill
- Frank Johnson (27 April 1855 – 25 April 1921), auctioneer, councillor, alderman and mayor of Adelaide 1907–1909
- Fred Johnson (7 October 1857 – March 1941), timber merchant, was mayor of Charters Towers, Queensland many times. He married Sarah Elizabeth Ross ( – 2 June 1933) c. 1885
- eldest daughter Ellen Johnson ( – 10 December 1900) married David Davidson on 5 April 1876, lived at "Gowan Lea", Prospect
- third daughter Mary Emily Johnson ( – 1 June 1926) married undertaker Edwin Arthur Mayfield (c. 1854 – 2 April 1920) on 9 March 1886, lived at Glenelg
- fourth daughter Bertha Lockley Johnson (c. 1863 – 29 April 1944) married John Craven ( – 18 November 1932) on 1 February 1887, lived at "Rusheens", Childers street, North Adelaide
- Alice Elizabeth Johnson ( – 13 November 1913) married Joseph Henry Morgan on 22 January 1891, lived in Melbourne

They lived on Avenue Road, North Adelaide, then from around 1890 at Palmer Place, North Adelaide.
