= Alfred Allen Simpson =

Australian industrialist (1875–1939)

Alfred Allen Simpson CBE CMG
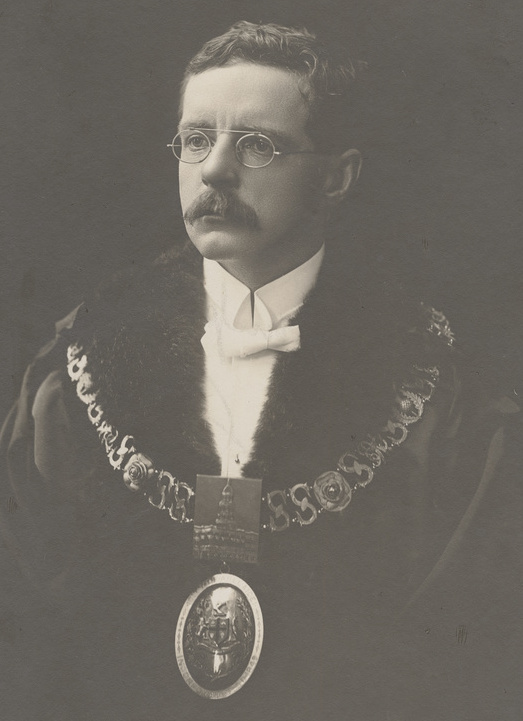

Mayor of Adelaide
- In office 1913–1915

Personal details
- Born: 15 April 1875
- Died: 27 November 1939 (aged 64)
- Occupation: industrialist

Alfred Allen Simpson CBE CMG (15 April 1875 – 27 November 1939) was an industrialist in South Australia and a partner in the firm A. Simpson & Son, founded by his grandfather Alfred Simpson. He was the mayor of Adelaide from 1913 to 1915.

== History ==
Alfred Allen Simpson was a son of Alfred Muller Simpson and his first wife Catherine Simpson, née Allen.

Both Allen and his brother, Frederick Neighbour Simpson, learned the trade of tinsmith, much as their father and grandfather had done, except that they were not apprenticed; Allen learned the craft in the Gawler Place workshop and Fred in the stove factory in Pirie Street. Both also served in the retail shop where they later took on management tasks — Allen in the internal running of the business and Fred in charge of marketing and purchasing of raw materials: tinned and galvanized sheet metal, rivets and so forth. When their father took a trip to England in 1900 Allen acted as General Manager. The firm by this stage had 330 employees. A challenge at this time was Federation, and the removal of interstate tariffs, opening up the South Australian market to competition from Victoria.

Allen Simpson had his father's social responsibility in regard to his workers and to society in general. He was elected to the Hindmarsh ward of the Adelaide City Council in 1901, at the same election as his friend (later Sir) John Lavington Bonython. At that time, they were the youngest two members of Council ever. In 1903, he was elected Alderman after the retirement of Joseph Vardon.

He was prominent in the founding of the Metropolitan Dairies Board (later Metropolitan County Board) and its first chairman. He traveled without payment to Britain and Europe to learn about the systems of old-age pensions and electric tramways.

He was elected Mayor of Adelaide in 1913 and again in 1914, again second only to Bonython as the youngest to hold that office. With the recession brought on by the closing of mines in 1914 and the record drought, he brought forward outstanding works such as extensions to the Central Market and the Town Hall.

In 1915 he initiated the South Australian Soldiers' Fund, and with Lady Galway helped found the Belgium Relief Fund. He made it clear to his employees that any volunteers for overseas service with the 1st AIF could have their jobs back when they returned.

== Other interests ==
- He became a member of the Royal Geographical Society of Australasia in 1896 and served as President of the South Australian branch from 1925 to 1930. He contributed generously to C. T. Madigan's 1929 aerial survey of Central Australia. He financed the second crossing of the desert by camel in 1939, on which his son Robert Simpson went along as wireless operator. He helped finance Douglas Mawson's Antarctic expeditions.
- He was an active member of the Adelaide Chamber of Commerce and its president from 1932 to 1934. He was treasurer of the Associated Chambers of Commerce of Australia from 1933 to 1935, and its vice-president 1935 to 1936.
- He was a director of the Bank of Adelaide and the South Australian Gas Company.
- He was fluent in spoken and written German, and strongly opposed the 1917 renaming of Germanic placenames.

== Recognition ==
- Simpson was awarded the King Albert Medal by the King of the Belgians.
- He was initiated into the Worshipful Company of Tinsmiths so becoming a Freeman of the City of London, following his grandfather.
- He was made a Companion of the Order of St Michael and St George (CMG) in the 1919 Birthday Honours.
- He was made CBE in 1923
- Simpson was awarded the Knight of Grace of the Order of the Hospital of St. John of Jerusalem.
- The Simpson Desert was named in his honour.
- Cape Simpson, on the coast of Adélie Land, Antarctica, was also named for him.

== Family ==
Alfred Allen Simpson (1875–1939) married Janet Doris Hübbe (1887–1950) in 1910. Janet was a daughter of educator Edith Agnes Cook. From 1919 on, he resided with his family in Undelcarra in Burnside. Their children were:

- Alfred Moxon Simpson AC (17 November 1910 – 11 November 2001) married Elizabeth Robson Cleland (16 October 1910 – 31 January 2005) on 3 August 1938. Elizabeth, a daughter of Professor J. B. Cleland, was an historian and author of:

The Hahndorf Walkers and the Beaumont Connection Beaumont Press, Adelaide 1983 ISBN 0-9592458-0-4.
The Clelands of Beaumont: a history of 26 generations of a South Australian family Beaumont Press, Adelaide 1986 ISBN 0-9592458-1-2
Beaumont House: The land and its people Beaumont Press, Adelaide 1993 ISBN 0-9592458-2-0

- Robert Allen "Bob" Simpson (1912–1996)
- Edith Janet Allen "Janet" Simpson (28 April 1915 – 29 July 1995) married Lieut. Eric Elton Mayo RAN (28 July 1912 – 19 November 1941) on 4 July 1939. A son of Sir Herbert Mayo (1885–1972), Eric was lost in the sinking of HMAS Sydney. They had two sons. Janet was noted as the longtime president of the War Widows Guild.
- Audrey Katherine Allen Simpson (30 January 1917 – 27 February 2014) married Professor Andrew Arthur Abbie (8 February 1905 – 22 July 1976)
- Derek Allen Frederick Simpson (8 August 1920 – 14 September 1975) married Virginia Russell on 17 May 1947.
- Donald Adrian Allen Simpson (13 April 1927 – ) married Joana Thomson

Government offices
Preceded by Sir John Lavington Bonython	Mayor of Adelaide; 1913–1915	Succeeded by Isaac Isaacs
