= 1864 Melbourne Cup =

- Melbourne Cup
- Location: Flemington Racecourse
- Date: 3 November 1864
- Distance: 2 miles
- Winning horse: Lantern
- Winning time: 3:52.0
- Final odds: 15/1
- Jockey: Samuel Davis
- Trainer: William Filgate
- Owner: Hurtle Fisher
- Surface: Turf
- Attendance: 6,000

The 1864 Melbourne Cup was a two-mile handicap horse race which took place on Thursday, 3 November 1864.

This year was the fourth running of the Melbourne Cup, and the first to be raced under the control of the Victoria Racing Club.

Lantern, jockeyed by Samuel Pope Davis, carried just 6 st 3 lb (39.5 kg) to defeat Poet and Rose of Denmark finished third. The race was run in heavy going and Lantern's time of 3 minutes and 52 seconds equalled the 1861 Melbourne Cup for the slowest winning time. Trained by William Filgate, Lantern then became the first horse to win the Cup and the VRC Derby in the same year though unlike today the Derby was run after the Cup. The Derby was run a day after the Cup and after winning there he returned to win over a mile the next day to win three races in three straight days. Lantern was put down after he broke down in the Ballarat Cup days later.

In heavy conditions, Saturn led the field at the first turn after the horses had passed in front of the grandstand for the first time. Poet and Lantern then took up the front running before the final turn with Lantern winning by a length-and-a-half from Poet, while Rose of Denmark finished third before three horses passed the post for fourth. The judges awarded fourth to Gwendoline.

Bred in South Australia, Lantern was owned by Hurtle Fisher, a committee member of the Victoria Racing Club and was commonly known as "The Squire of Maribryrnong" due to his extensive stud and training grounds.

== Full results ==
This is the list of placegetters for the 1864 Melbourne Cup.

Place	Horse	Age Gender	Jockey	Weight	Trainer	Owner	Odds	Margin
1	Lantern	3y c	Samuel Davis	6 st 3 lb (39.5 kg)	William Filgate	Hurtle Fisher	15/1	1½ lengths
2	Poet	4y h	W. Perkins	8 st 0 lb (50.8 kg) (Note: Was supposed to carry 7st 12lb)		Isaac Pear	20/1	2 lengths
3	Rose of Denmark	4y m	H. Howard	8 st 3 lb (52.2 kg)	Hurtle Fisher	Hurtle Fisher	10/1	
4	Gwendoline	3y f	Thomas Pullar	5 st 12 lb (37.2 kg)		Mr W. Treacy	25/1	
5	Ebor	6y h	Denis Fountain	8 st 12 lb (56.2 kg)	James Wilson	Mr J.C. James (Note: J.C. James is an alias of Captain Lyons, a grazier during the 1860s)	15/1	
6	Musidora	5y m	William Simpson	9 st 4 lb (59.0 kg)	James Wilson	James Wilson	4/1	
—N/a	Barwon	5y h	J. Henderson	9 st 9 lb (61.2 kg)		Joseph Harper	6/1	
—N/a	Falcon	5y h	Joe Morrison	9 st 9 lb (61.2 kg)		Philip Dowling	8/1	
—N/a	Playboy	Aged g	Dowling	8 st 9 lb (54.9 kg)		Patrick Keighran	20/1	
—N/a	Banker	4y h	Sam Waldock	8 st 7 lb (54.0 kg)		Joseph Harper	10/1	
—N/a	Glenyuille	4y h	Holmes	8 st 7 lb (54.0 kg)		Mr Cook	15/1	
—N/a	Saturn	6y h	Lang	8 st 6 lb (53.5 kg) (Note: Was supposed to carry 8st 2lb)		Mr T. Henty	8/1	
—N/a	Flying Buck	Aged g	J. Carter	7 st 9 lb (48.5 kg)		Mr Bavin	10/1	
—N/a	Chrysolite	4y m	Redman	7 st 8 lb (48.1 kg)		Hurtle Fisher	20/1	
—N/a	Attila	Aged g	Parslow	7 st 5 lb (46.7 kg) (Note: Was supposed to carry 7st 3lb)		Mr C. Day	25/1	
—N/a	Fleur-de-Lis	5y m	Grimwood	7 st 5 lb (46.7 kg) (Note: Was supposed to carry 7st 0lb)		Mr Holmes	10/1	
—N/a	Freestone	3y c	Green	7 st 3 lb (45.8 kg) (Note: Was supposed to carry 5st 12lb)		Mr D. Robinson	10/1	
—N/a	Roebuck	3y c	Bateman	6 st 10 lb (42.6 kg)		Philip Dowling	7/2 fav.	
—N/a	Bedouin	3y g	Harry Chifney (Note: Jockey Henry Dawes rode under the name Harry Chifney.)	5 st 9 lb (35.8 kg) (Note: Was supposed to carry 5st 7lb)		Mr Jeffrey	20/1	
SCR	Sir Lancer	—N/a	—N/a	—N/a	—N/a	—N/a	—N/a	
SCR	Stag	—N/a	—N/a	—N/a	—N/a	—N/a	—N/a	

== Prizemoney ==
First prize £734, second prize £20.

== See also ==
- Melbourne Cup
- List of Melbourne Cup winners
- Victoria Racing Club
