= Joseph Hall (mayor) =

Australian politician

Joseph Hall (c. 1803 or c. 1806 – 10 February 1857) was The Mayor of Adelaide from 1854 to 1855.

== History ==
Joseph Hall migrated from England to South Australia around 1841. He was in business as a sharebroker with offices in the Waterhouse Chambers at the corner of Rundle and King William Streets. He was elected Alderman for Robe Ward in October 1852, following the resignation of Peter Cumming, and elected mayor in 1854. He had a residence on Pennington Terrace, overlooking the Park Lands.

He died after a fall from a residence on Kermode Street, North Adelaide, while suffering from the effects of delirium tremens. His family left for England around the same time. Apart from further details on the circumstances of his death, further information is hard to find.

== See also ==
List of mayors and lord mayors of Adelaide

Political offices
Preceded by James Fisher	Mayor of the Corporation of Adelaide; 1854–1855	Succeeded by John Lazar
