= William Dixon Allott =

Australian politician

William Dixon Allott (1 May 1817 – 19 November 1892) was Mayor of Adelaide 1873–1874.

Allott was born in Walsall, Staffordshire, England, the son of a minister. He was first apprenticed to a druggist and later was a member of the Pharmaceutical Society of Great Britain. He arrived in South Australia in 1854, working as a chemist and druggist. Allott was the 18th mayor of Adelaide.

He died in Knightsbridge, South Australia in 1892.
