= T. P. Cameron Wilson =

English poet and novelist (1888–1918)

Theodore Percival Cameron Wilson (April 25, 1888 - March 23, 1918), was an English poet and novelist of the First World War, best known for his poem Magpies in Picardy, published posthumously in 1919 by The Poetry Bookshop.

Wilson was born in Paignton, Devon, where his father, Theodore Cameron Wilson, was vicar of Christ Church, Paignton. His mother was Annie Smith, possibly an American; his grandfather, the Rev. Theodore Percival Wilson was, albeit briefly, a pioneering priest in South Australia and first headmaster of Adelaide's great Anglican school, St Peter's College. He was also a popular novelist, noted for Frank Oldfield, set in South Australia and England on the theme of temperance. Wilson was the fourth of six children; the youngest brother became a successful actor under the name of Charles Cameron, and one sister, Marjorie, was a published poet.

Wilson preferred to be known as "Jim" rather than by any of his given forenames. He was scrappily educated, went to Oxford in 1907 as a non-collegiate student, and left without a degree in about 1910 to become a teacher at a preparatory school, Mount Arlington in Hindhead, Surrey. One of his pupils was the son of the poet Harold Monro, who became a friend. His first novel, The Friendly Enemy, was published in 1913. Before the First World War broke out, he spent much of his leisure time at the Poetry Bookshop in London, which was run by Monro, and probably wrote a great many poems and short stories.

Upon the British entry into World War I in August 1914, though quite unmilitary, Wilson joined the British Armed Forces, and the following year obtained a commission in the Sherwood Foresters. He reached the Western Front in February 1916 and was horrified by what he saw. Some emotional letters home said that a man had to be 'either a peace-maker or a degenerate'. Magpies in Picardy was published in the Westminster Gazette on 16 August 1916. At around the same time he was moved to the staff and was introduced to General Sir Douglas Haig, Commander-in-Chief of the British Expeditionary Force (BEF) in Belgium and France. He continued to write poems, but became more and more depressed by his situation, but fortified by the belief that theirs would end all wars. Having gained promotion to the rank of captain, he was moved back to the front line and was killed at Hermies in France during the great German assault in late March 1918. He has no known grave and is commemorated on the Arras Memorial to the Missing and on the lychgate at Little Eaton church, Derbyshire. His collected poems were published by Monro in 1919 under the title Magpies in Picardy and a second novel, Bolts from the Blue, appeared in 1929.
