= George Joseph (Australian politician) =

Australian politician

69th Lord Mayor of Adelaide
- In office 1977–1979
- Preceded by: John Justin Roche
- Succeeded by: James Vincent Seaton Bowen

George Joseph was the Lord Mayor of the City of Adelaide in South Australia from 1977 to 1979.

Joseph is from a Lebanese Australian family who were involved in garment making. He grew up opposite the Cumberland Hotel in Waymouth Street in Adelaide's west end. One of his neighbours was future senator Nick Bolkus. He attended Christian Brothers School in Wakefield Street. Before becoming Lord Mayor, he worked as a lawyer in the same street he grew up on and was a city councillor.
