= Janet Mayo =

Edith Janet Allen Mayo CBE, OBE née Simpson (28 April 1915 – 29 July 1995), known as Janet Mayo or (formally) Mrs. Eric Mayo, was an advocate for war widows in Australia.

== History ==
Janet was born in Adelaide, South Australia, a daughter of industrialist Alfred Allen Simpson and grew up in the family mansion "Undelcarra" on Lockwood Road, Burnside.

On 4 July 1939, at the Adelaide Unitarian Christian Church, Wakefield Street, Janet Simpson married Lieut. Eric Elton Mayo RAN (28 July 1912 – 19 November 1941). A son of Sir Herbert Mayo (1885–1972), Eric was lost in the sinking of HMAS Sydney. Janet, aged 26, was pregnant with their second son.

Janet became aware of the difficulties faced by war widows, especially those who were bringing up young children. She was in 1946 a founding member of the South Australian branch of the War Widows Craft Guild, a social support organization founded the previous year by National President Mrs. G. A. "Jessie" Vasey. Janet became president of the South Australian branch in 1947, a position she held for over twenty years. Under the leadership of such women it became a powerful advocate for those whose husbands were lost as a result of their service in the Australian military forces, and was from 1948 known as the War Widows Guild of Australia. On the death of Jessie Vasey in 1966, Janet became National President, a position she held until retiring in 1977.

== Recognition ==
She was appointed an Officer (Civil) in the Order of the British Empire (OBE) in the 1967 New Year Honours list for her work as National President, War Widows' Guild of Australia.

She was appointed a Commander (Civil) in the Order of the British Empire (CBE) on 31 December 1976, for community service.
