= Walter Lewis Bridgland =

Australian politician (1908–1987)

Walter Lewis Bridgland AM OBE JP (23 March 1908 – 30 July 1987) was a prominent South Australian businessman and a Lord Mayor of Adelaide.

== History ==
Wally was born at the tin mining town of Greenbushes, Western Australia, where his newly-wed parents Harrie Walter Bridgland (31 May 1879 – 17 October 1947) and Hannah Maud Bridgland, née Cohen, (1876 – 13 June 1958) had set up a store. A year later they returned to Adelaide, living for much of his early life at the Barnard Street, North Adelaide home of the hospitable grandparents Lewis and Selina Cohen; his mother helped run the household. Around 1925 the Cohens moved into an apartment in Colley Terrace, Glenelg and Wally's parents moved to 59 Partridge Street, Glenelg

He was a student at Pulteney Street School (later to become Pulteney Grammar School), then at Queen's College in North Adelaide. He excelled at schoolboy athletics, cricket and football but like his father, his passion was for swimming, eventually becoming president and a Life Member of the SA Amateur Swimming Association. In 1932 he was instrumental in saving a man who was drowning in the sea off Glenelg and was awarded a medal by the Royal Humane Society. His home for most of his adult life was in Pier Street Glenelg, just a few minutes' walk from the beach.

Wally joined the Cadets while at high school, then after leaving school in 1924, while working as accountant for his father's finance company, enrolled with the CMF, and served in the AIF during World War II, initially with the Light Horse Regiment, which became the Armoured Corps. Because of his experience in the CMF he received a commission and later became a captain. He was transferred to the RAEME in a Docks Operating Company in charge of the harbour at Madang. Later he was stationed at a hotel in Willunga in charge of Italian POWs who were working farms south of Adelaide. After the war he rejoined the CMF, retiring in 1957.

In 1946, after demobbing, he set up a business at 91a Gawler Place "W. L. Bridgland children's furnishings" selling nursery furniture. The shop grew to specialise in play equipment, toys and hobbies. His son Michael joined the business in 1951 and was made a partner in 1957 and a second shop in 81 Gawler Place specialising in models, particularly model trains was opened and as "Bridgland's Hobbies" became their sole outlet some time around 1970. The business closed in 1986.

== Public life ==
- Chairman of the board, Adelaide Botanic Gardens.
- President of the Jewish Ex-Servicemen and Women's Association (SA Branch)
- served as a Justice of the Peace
- He and daughter Margot were actively involved in the Liberal and Country League (LCL) and were delegates to the State Council.
- In July 1956 he won the Young ward in the Adelaide City Council (as an endorsed LCL candidate) by a majority of six votes. He held the seat for 26 continuous years. He was Lord Mayor from 1966 to 1968, then an Alderman until he retired from Council in 1984. Among the posts he held during this time were Chairman of the Traffic Committee, Public Health Committee and the Health, Welfare, Recreation and Parks Committee. He represented the Council on the Metropolitan Taxi Cab Board for ten years. While Lord Mayor, he was the council's representative on the Municipal Association of S.A., the Metropolitan County Board, the Council of the Royal Zoological Society, the National Parks Commission, St. Johns Ambulance Association and the Royal Humane Society.
- President of the Adelaide Festival of Arts 1968

== Family ==
Walter was the only son of Harrie Walter Bridgland (31 May 1879 – 17 October 1947) whose father Walter James Bridgland died on 20 September 1878 and whose mother Mary Ann Bridgland (née Wigzell) (ca. June 1856 – 7 January 1885) subsequently married Vaiben Louis Solomon on 6 December 1880 in Darwin, Northern Territory. Harrie grew up with the surname Solomon, but the relationship with his adoptive father broke down irrevocably some time before 1903 and he resumed his birth name. Thirty years later he acknowledged the father he never knew and not his stepfather.

Walter's mother, Hannah Maud Bridgland (1876 – 13 June 1958), was a daughter of Sir Lewis Cohen, several times mayor of Adelaide.

Walter married Elizabeth Grace "Betty" Saunders (23 June 1906 – 1994), daughter of Rachel "Ray" and Solomon "Sol" Saunders, on 9 April 1929 after he had undergone Jewish studies and learned Hebrew (though Jewish by birth, he had a secular upbringing). They had two children:

- Margot Elizabeth (1930 – ) married Keith Bailey in 1958
- Michael Walter (1933 – ) married Janet Crossley in 1954

== Recognition ==
- In 1967 he was chosen South Australian Father of the Year
- In 1976 he was awarded the Order of the British Empire
- In 1985 he was made Member of the Order of Australia

== Sources ==
- http://adelaidejmuseum.org/portfolio/memories-of-my-father-walter-lewis-bridgeland/
