= George Philips (cricketer) =

English cricketer

Personal information
- Full name: George Henry Philips
- Born: 18 July 1831; Ardwick, Lancashire, England
- Died: 22 October 1886 (aged 55); Abbeycwmhir, Radnorshire, Wales
- Batting: Unknown
- Role: Wicket-keeper

Domestic team information
- Years: Team
- 1853: Oxford University
- 1858: Marylebone Cricket Club

Career statistics
Competition	First-class
Matches	2
Runs scored	29
Batting average	7.25
100s/50s	–/–
Top score	15
Catches/stumpings	1/1
- Source: Cricinfo, 30 October 2021

George Henry Philips JP DL (18 July 1831 – 22 October 1886) was an English first-class cricketer.

The son of Francis Aspinall Philips, he was born in July 1831 at Ardwick, Lancashire. He was educated at Eton College, before going up to Christ Church, Oxford in 1849. While studying at Oxford, he played first-class cricket for Oxford University Cricket Club on one occasion in 1853 against the Marylebone Cricket Club (MCC) at Oxford. Five years later he made a second appearance in first-class cricket, this time for the MCC against Oxford University at Oxford. For Oxford University he played as a wicket-keeper, taking one catch and making one stumping, while across both matches he scored 29 runs. He inherited Abbey Cwmhir Hall in Radnorshire from his father in 1859. The following year he was appointed High Sheriff of Radnorshire and later served as both a deputy lieutenant and justice of the peace for the county. Philips died at Abbey Cwmhir Hall in October 1886.
