= Charles Richmond Glover =

Lord Mayor of Adelaide, South Australia, for two terms in the 1920s and 1930s

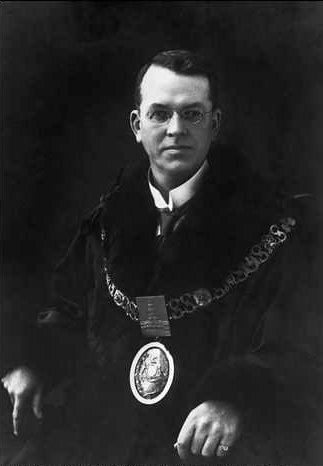

1st Lord Mayor of Adelaide
- In office 22 November 1919 – 29 November 1919
- Preceded by: Position created
- Succeeded by: Frank Beaumont Moulden
- In office 1923–1925
- Preceded by: Lewis Cohen
- Succeeded by: Wallace Bruce
- In office 1930–1933
- Preceded by: John Lavington Bonython
- Succeeded by: Jonathan Robert Cain

Mayor of Adelaide
- In office 4 December 1917 – 22 November 1919
- Preceded by: Isaac Isaacs
- Succeeded by: Position abolished

Personal details
- Born: 3 May 1870 Richmond, Surrey; United Kingdom
- Died: October 27, 1936 (aged 66) Adelaide, South Australia
- Cause of death: Cancer
- Resting place: West Terrace Cemetery
- Spouse: Elizabeth Hannam (m. 1910)
- Children: Sir John Glover
- Parents: Charles Peter Glover (father); Hannah Shortland (mother)
- Education: Prince Alfred College
- Occupation: Businessman, politician

Charles Richmond John Glover (1870–1936) was the Mayor of Adelaide from 1917 to 1919. He was in office when the City of Adelaide became a Lord Mayoralty in 1919, and so became Adelaide's first Lord Mayor. He served two further terms as Lord Mayor: from 1923 to 1925 and from 1930 to 1933.

He was a company director, active in the Freemasons and philanthropist. He established the three Glover playgrounds in the Adelaide Parklands that are named after him.

He was a major collector of books on Australia and the Pacific. This library was inherited by his son and, in turn, by his grandson. The collection, consisting of 2,787 lots, was sold by auction in December 1970.

He was a regular worshipper at St. John's Anglican Church and the author of History of the Church of St. John the Evangelist (1919).

He was father of Charles John Glover, known as Sir John Glover, also Lord Mayor of Adelaide from 1960 to 1963.

== Personal life ==
In 1910 he married Elizabeth Maude Hannam.

== Publications ==
- Glover, C.R.J. (Charles Richmond John), 1870-1936, A history of first fifty years of Freemasonry in South Australia, 1834-1884. Grand Lodge of South Australia, 1916.
- Charles Richmond John Glover, A Brief History of the Church of St. John the Evangelist, Adelaide, 1839-1909, published 1908.
