= Banker (horse) =

Australian-bred Thoroughbred racehorse

- Sire: Boiardo (GB)
- Grandsire: Orlando (GB)
- Dam: Jeannette (AUS)
- Damsire: Little John (GB)
- Sex: Stallion
- Foaled: 1860
- Country: Australia
- Colour: Bay
- Owner: Joseph Harper
- Trainer: Sam Waldock

Major wins
- Melbourne Cup (1863)
- Last updated on 23 October 2018

Banker was an Australian bred Thoroughbred racehorse that won the 1863 Melbourne Cup.

The 1863 Melbourne Cup was the smallest field in the Cup's history with only 7 horses in total and Banker's weight of 33.57 kg was the lightest weight carried by any winning horse in the Melbourne Cup.

== Pedigree ==
Pedigree of Banker
Sire Boiardo 1851	Orlando 1841	Touchstone	Camel
Sire Boiardo 1851	Orlando 1841	Touchstone	Banter
Sire Boiardo 1851	Orlando 1841	Vulture	Langar
Sire Boiardo 1851	Orlando 1841	Vulture	Kite
Sire Boiardo 1851	Miss Bowe 1834	Catton	Golumpus
Sire Boiardo 1851	Miss Bowe 1834	Catton	Lucy Gray
Sire Boiardo 1851	Miss Bowe 1834	Orville Mare	Orville
Sire Boiardo 1851	Miss Bowe 1834	Orville Mare	Miss Grimstone
Dam Jeannette 1848	Little John 1831	Little John	Octavius
Dam Jeannette 1848	Little John 1831	Little John	Grey Skim
Dam Jeannette 1848	Little John 1831	Anna	Whalebone
Dam Jeannette 1848	Little John 1831	Anna	Themis
Dam Jeannette 1848	Wilhelmina 1843	Romeo	Partisan
Dam Jeannette 1848	Wilhelmina 1843	Romeo	Vice
Dam Jeannette 1848	Wilhelmina 1843	Moss Rose	Rous Emigrant
Dam Jeannette 1848	Wilhelmina 1843	Moss Rose	Driver Mare
