= Thomas Wilson (mayor) =

Australian politician

Thomas Wilson (5 September 1787 – 31 March 1863) was a solicitor, writer and Mayor of Adelaide from 1842 to 1843.

He was born in England but educated in Germany. On his return to England he was articled to Bartlett & Beddome, a London firm of solicitors.

In 1833 he purchased a 3000-acre estate in Abbeycwmhir, Radnorshire but now in Powys, Wales and commissioned the building of an Elizabethan-style house on the site of an earlier house overlooking the ruins of Cwmhir Abbey. He landscaped the estate at great expense, including the creation of a lake to power the village sawmill.

In 1836 published anonymously A Descriptive Catalogue of the Prints of Rembrandt. In 1838 he ran into financial difficulty and decided to emigrate to Australia. He and much of his family sailed in the Duke of Roxburghe and arrived in Adelaide in July 1838 where he soon built an extensive and highly respectable practice as a member of the firm of Smart & Wilson. In 1841 he was appointed clerk of the Court of Appeals by Governor (Sir) George Grey. He was elected to the Municipal Corporation of Adelaide in 1840 and designed the official seal. He was elected an Alderman the following year and the second Mayor in 1842.

He gave lectures on painting and engraving and published several poems (The Feast of Belshazzar, The Lonely Man of the Ocean, and Boyuca; or the Fountain of Youth).

He died in Kensington, South Australia in 1863.

== Family ==
Wilson married Martha Greenell (1790 – 29 January 1858) of Hertford, whose sister Mary Anne Greenell was the mother of Alfred Russel Wallace, and with whom he had five sons and three daughters. including:

- Dorothea Greenell Wilson (1813– ) married George Burningham, never left England
- George Wilson (1815–1894) not on Roxburghe, but emigrated later,
- Charles Algernon Wilson (18 June 1818 – 20 June 1884) Registrar of Probates, Commissioner of Inland Revenue, and Chief Clerk of the Supreme Court, South Australia
- Rev. Theodore Percival "Percy" Wilson (c. 1819 – 8 August 1881) not on Roxburghe but emigrated later, became first headmaster of St Peter's College, married Sophia Cameron, died in UK.
- Edmund Major Wilson (8 May 1826 – 19 March 1906) married the widow Ellen "Ellie" Gosden, née Gower (died 1913) on 22 May 1872, lived at Williamstown, South Australia
- Agnes St John Wilson (1828 – 10 February 1895) married Samuel Reynell (c. 1820 – 4 January 1892) in 1862
- Theodore Augustus Greenell Wilson (1831 – 31 August 1908), invariably referred to as T. A. G. Wilson "at one time clerk of the Executive Council" Government clerk at Dalkey, South Australia. The misspelling "Grenell" is common.
- Minna Florence Wilson (1834–1911) married Frederick Augustus Henry Klaehn (c. 1807 – 15 January 1888) on 28 October 1879

Political offices
Preceded by James Fisher	Mayor of the Corporation of Adelaide; 1842–1843	Succeeded by James Fisher
