= Lantern (horse) =

Australian-bred Thoroughbred racehorse

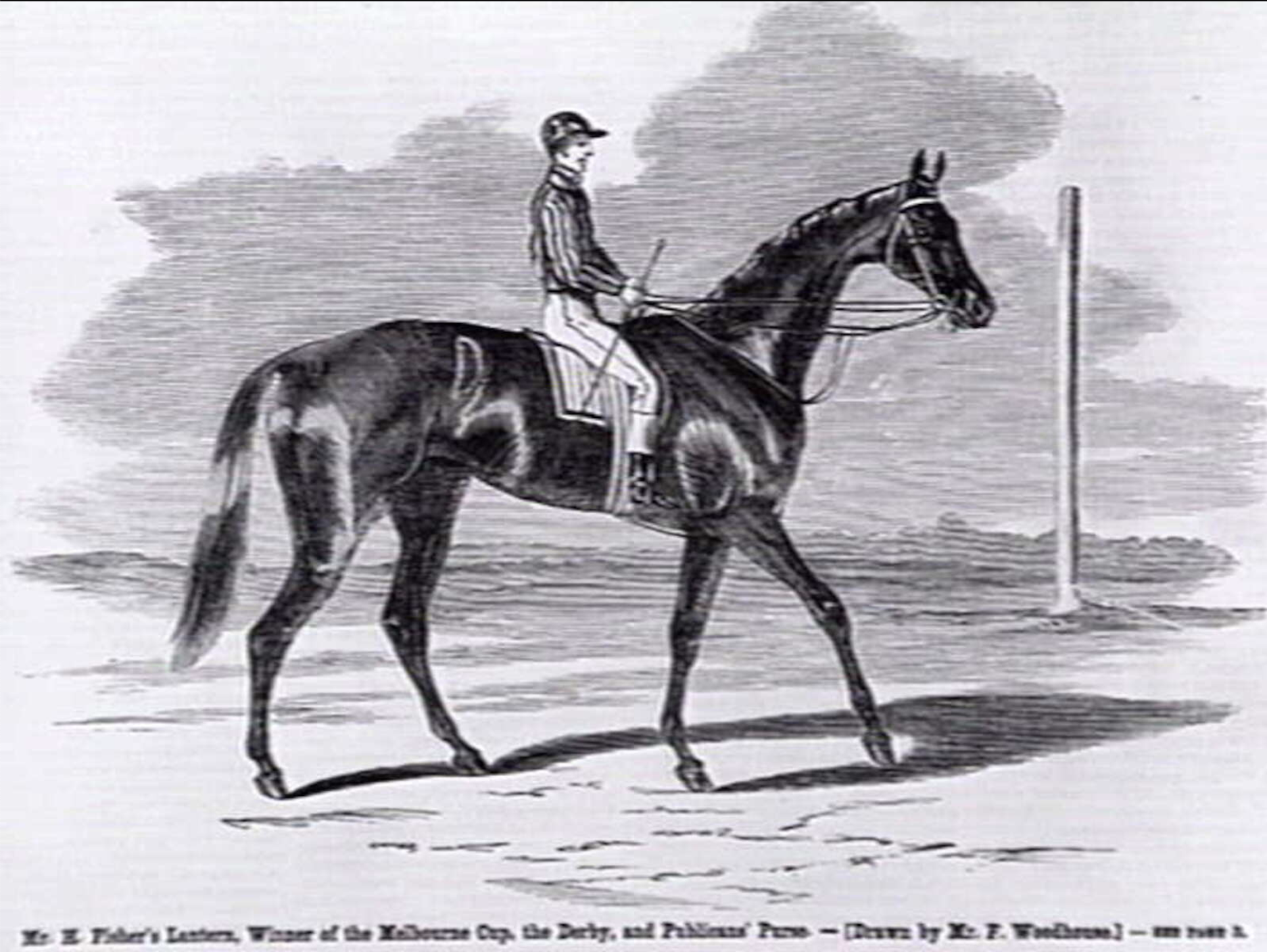
- Sire: Muscovado (GB)
- Grandsire: Sweetmeat (GB)
- Dam: Nightlight (GB)
- Damsire: Archy (GB)
- Sex: Colt
- Foaled: 1861
- Died: 1864
- Country: Australia
- Colour: Bay
- Owner: Hurtle Fisher
- Trainer: William Filgate

Major wins
- Melbourne Cup (1864); Victoria Derby (1864)
- Last updated on 23 October 2018

Lantern (1861–1864) was an Australian racehorse, owned by Hurtle Fisher, who won the 1864 Melbourne Cup and Victoria Derby.

== Racing career ==
In the Melbourne Cup Lantern, ridden by Samuel Pope Davis, started at odds of 15/1 and won in a time of 3 minutes 52 seconds, the slowest ever recorded for the race.

His owner also entered the colt into the Victoria Derby the following day, while on the third day of the meeting, Lantern competed in a mile race. He won both races.

Later the same month, in the Ballarat Derby on the first day of the Ballarat Turf Club Spring Meeting, Lantern beat Gwendoline in a two-horse race. The following day Lantern started in the Ballarat Cup as favourite but was injured near the finish and was pulled up.

On 12 December 1864 it was reported that Lantern had died two days earlier. A post mortem found the cause of death to be a ruptured kidney and damaged stifle.
