= Trinity Church Adelaide =

Church building in South Australia

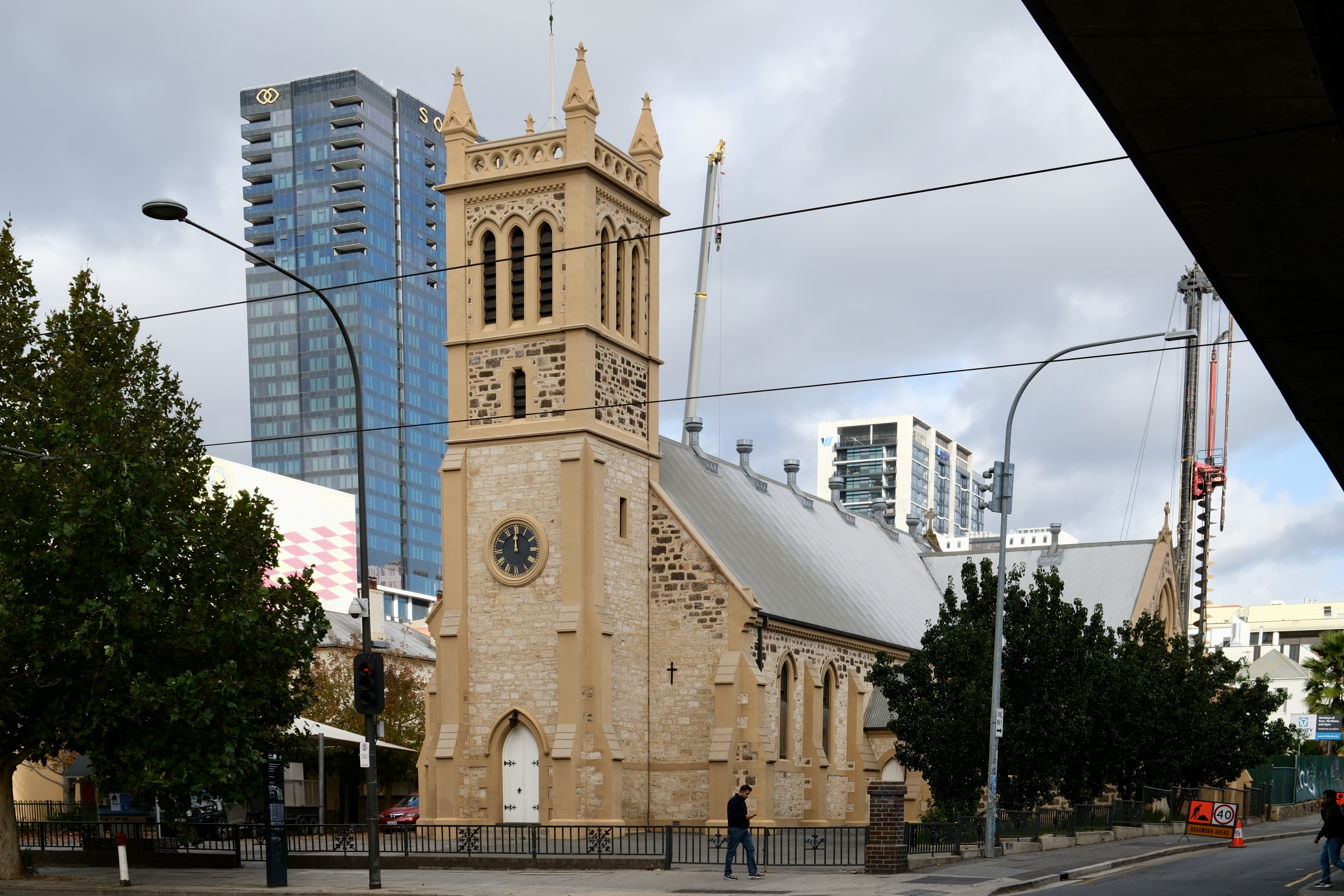
- Trinity Church Adelaide in 2026
- Former names: Holy Trinity Church; Trinity City

General information
- Type: Anglican church
- Architectural style: Victorian Gothic Revival
- Location: 88 North Terrace, Adelaide, South Australia, Australia
- Coordinates: 34°55′20″S 138°35′38″E
- Groundbreaking: 26 January 1838
- Completed: 1838
- Renovated: 1844–1845; 1888–1889

Technical details
- Material: Limestone and sandstone

Renovating team
- Architect: Edward Woods

Website
- www.trinitycity.church

South Australian Heritage Register
- Official name: Church - Holy Trinity
- Designated: 11 September 1986
- Reference no.: 13357

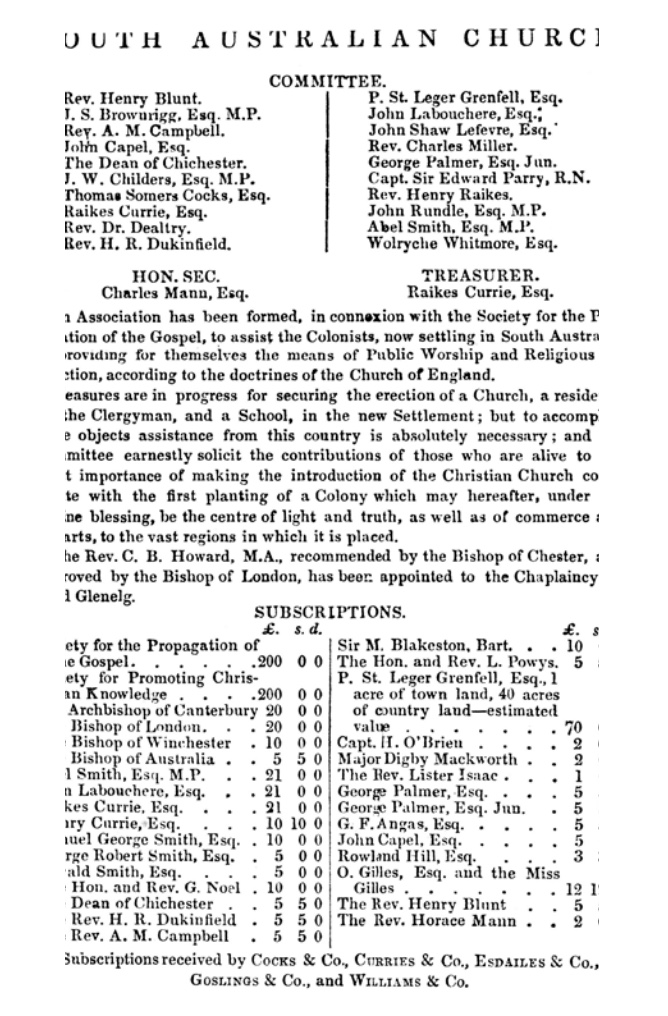
South Australian Church Notice 1836

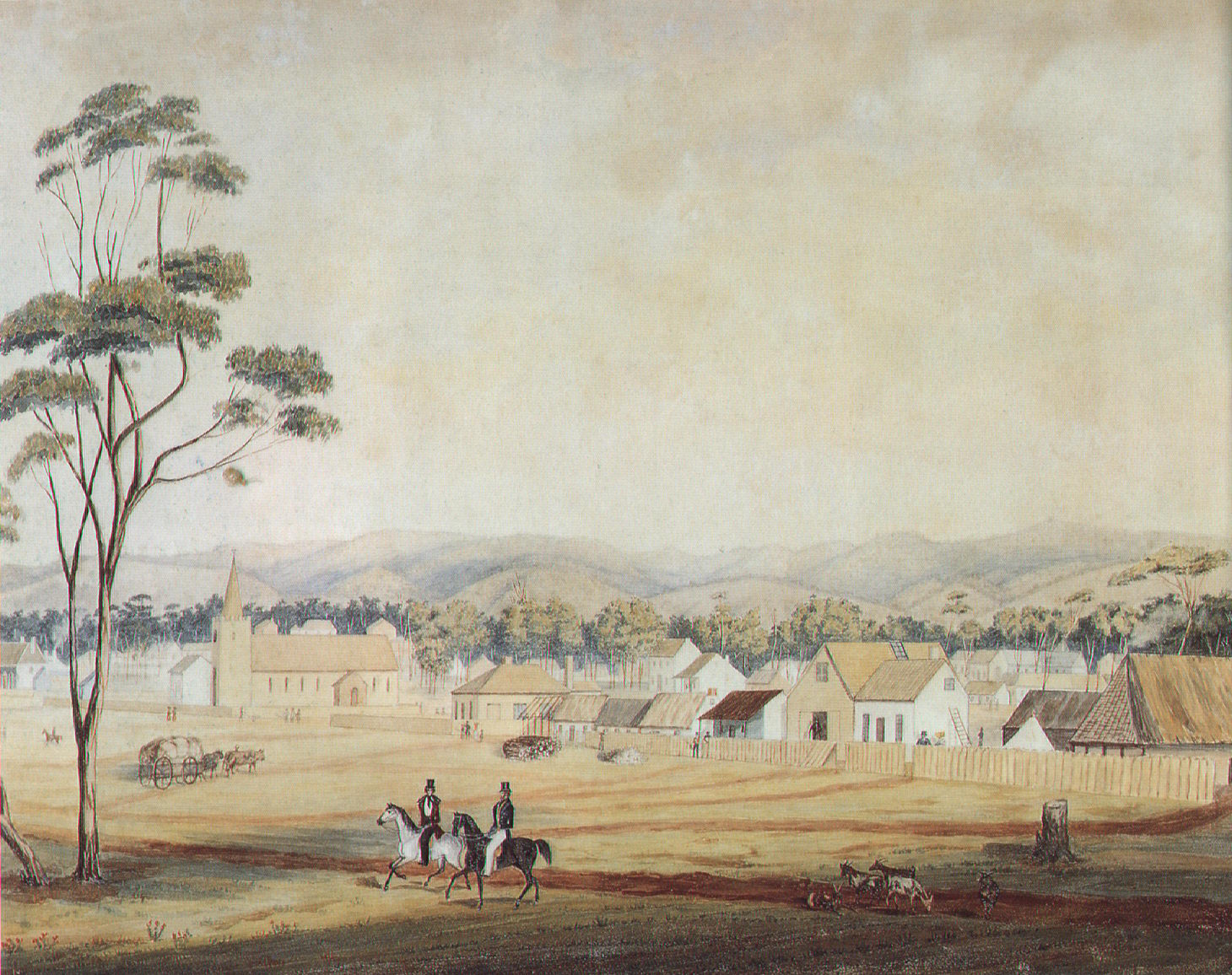
Adelaide in 1839 as viewed south-east from North Terrace, including Trinity Church (the church tower lost its 'peaked cap' in 1844)

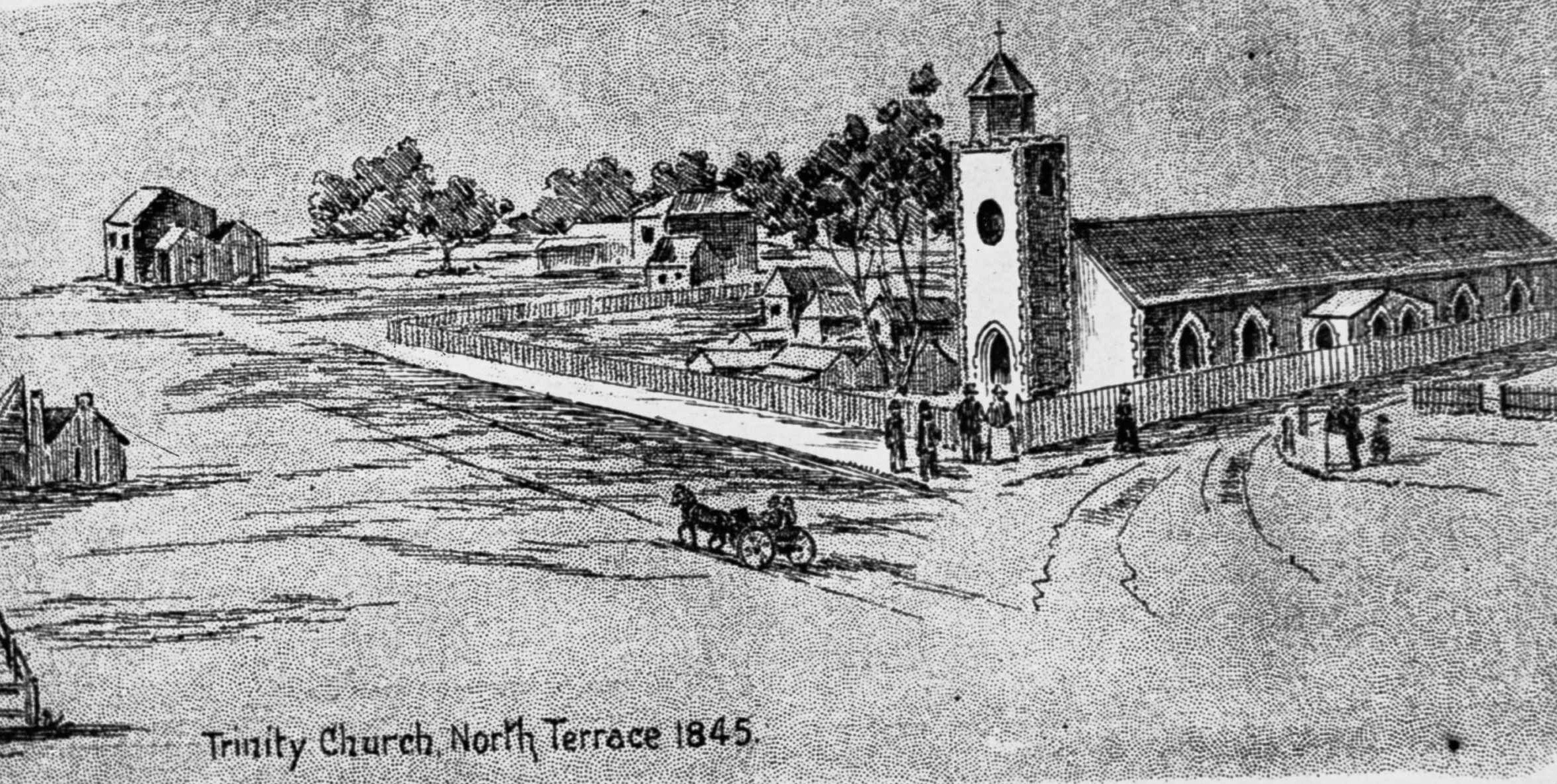
Illustration of Holy Trinity Church, Adelaide, 1845.

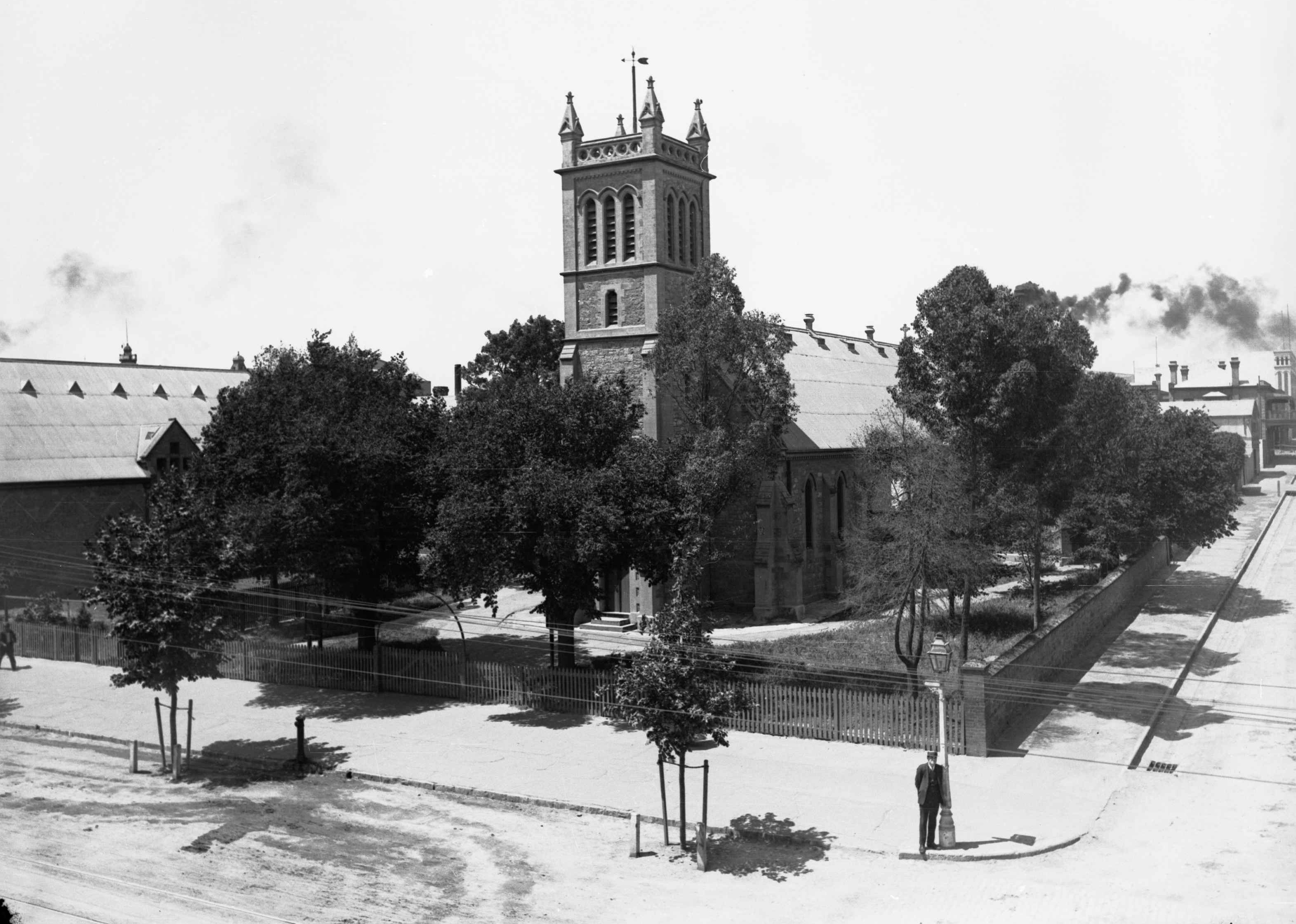
Photograph of the Holy Trinity, late 1800s

Trinity Church Adelaide, formerly known as Holy Trinity Church and later Trinity City, is an Australian evangelical Anglican church located at 88 North Terrace in the city of Adelaide, South Australia. Established in 1836 and rebuilt in 1845, it is one of the earliest churches in the colony of South Australia.

== History ==
Holy Trinity Church was established in 1836, and has been of great significance from the days of the earliest settlers in the first city in South Australia. It is also historically significant in that it contains elements of the earliest surviving Anglican church building in South Australia. Of special note is the William IV window that was brought to Adelaide in 1836.

The land on which the church stands (town acre no. 9) was donated by Pascoe St Leger Grenfell along with 40 acres of country land for a cemetery and "glebe" lands. Pascoe St Leger Grenfell, the holder of a preliminary land order, Raikes Currie and the Reverend Sir Henry Robert Dukinfield of the Society for the Propagation of the Gospel in Foreign Parts (SPG) who held the collective funds and, thirdly, the men to whom they were transferring their powers, namely James Hurtle Fisher, Osmond Gilles and Charles Mann. Fisher was to be resident commissioner in South Australia of the Colonisation Commission, having responsibility independent of the governor for the administration of land in the new colony; Gilles was to be the treasurer and Mann the advocate general or principal legal officer of the colony. Grenfell transferred control over order no. 171 for a town acre and over 40 acres of country land to be selected in conjunction with the town acre, later known as Trinity Gardens. The conveyance did not have to specify that Currie and Dukinfield hand over money and the portable church, but it may be presumed they did so — alternatively they may have entrusted these resources to John Morphett, appointed as SPG's attorney in the colony. The objects of the trust were to use the town acre as a site for "the erection of a church where Divine Service could be celebrated according to the rites and ceremonies of the Church of England". The same acre was also to provide space for a schoolroom and a parsonage and garden for the minister of the church. The country land was to provide six to eight acres for a cemetery and the remainder to be "glebe land", in the familiar phrase of the Church of England, to provide income for the support of the minister. The first incumbent, from 1836 to 1943, was the Rev. C. B. Howard (1807–1843).

The church was built in three main stages. It was originally planned that the church would be a prefabricated building imported from England; however it was soon found to be unsuitable, (Note: The reason for its rejection was not recorded, but it served as chapter house until the 1880s.) and it was decided instead to build a stone church, Henry J. Moseley the builder. Governor Hindmarsh laid the foundation stone on 26 January 1838, within two years of the settlement of Adelaide (see History of Adelaide), and named it "Trinity Church" after the University college attended by Rev. Howard. The church opened for worship about August that year.

In 1844 the church was closed for repairs and the clock was removed for safekeeping. The body of the church was rebuilt and re-roofed and the tower lost its peaked cap. It reopened in August 1845. When Bishop Short arrived in 1847, Holy Trinity assumed many of the functions of a cathedral and was - until other congregations (especially Christ Church, North Adelaide) were established — the place of worship for the governors, many of the colony's prominent families and the military.

Memorial plaque to James Hurtle Fisher, resident commissioner of the colony of South Australia, first Mayor of Adelaide and trustee of the church

In 1878, there was a proposal to rebuild when some money was subscribed, but this did not take place until the congregation decided in the mid-1880s to completely rebuild the church to a design by the prominent architect Edward John Woods, using the mellow sandstone which eventually weathered to match the original limestone. It was around this time that the present name of "Holy Trinity" became current.

The hall and the rectory are also significant features in the precinct. The hall was built in 1887 using a donation from a parishioner. The original rectory was a prefabricated "Manning" building which arrived in better condition than the church. It was replaced by the present building in 1851 and was the home of seven successive incumbents.

The Rev. Lance Shilton, later Dean of Sydney, was rector of Holy Trinity from 1957 to 1973.

After a review was undertaken, a 10-year restoration project was begun on the church building, and parish hall, and car park in 2016, with financial support from Adelaide City Council.

== Names ==
Now known as Trinity Church Adelaide, the church was previously known as Trinity City, and before that Holy Trinity Church.

== Ministry ==
Trinity Church is a large evangelical and conservative Anglican church. Its main campus is adjacent to the University of South Australia (Uni SA), City West campus. Through its involvement with the Australian Fellowship of Evangelical Students on tertiary campuses it also has links to its students at the University of Adelaide and the Uni SA City campuses. Members of Trinity City Church are also involved in the Church Missionary Society (CMS) and Scripture Union. Trinity has Sunday school for children in primary school, a youth group for high school students, a young adults group, a weekday women's meeting group, a large number of small Bible study groups and various other groups.

Trinity Church is part of the Adelaide diocese and has an increasing number of locally trained staff, particularly trainees through the Ministry Training Strategy and students of the Bible College of South Australia. In 2007 Trinity Church was involved in initiating "Equip", a training program for Evangelical Anglican churches in South Australia. This ceased in 2016.

As of May 2023 Trinity Church has 13 daughter churches:

- Trinity Church Aldgate, in the Adelaide Hills
- Trinity Church Brighton, in the Adelaide sea-side suburb of Hove, South Australia
- Trinity Church Campbelltown, in Campbelltown, South Australia
- Trinity Church Colonel Light Gardens, Colonel Light Gardens, South Australia
- Trinity Church Golden Grove, in Golden Grove
- Trinity Church Lockleys, in Lockleys, South Australia
- Trinity Church Modbury, in a suburb of Tea Tree Gully Council, Modbury, South Australia
- Trinity Church Mount Barker, in the outer regional centre of Mount Barker, South Australia
- Trinity Church Para Hills, in Para Hills, South Australia
- Trinity Church Tonsley, in Tonsley, South Australia
- Trinity Church Unley, in Unley
- Trinity Church Victor Harbor, in Victor Harbor
- Trinity Church Woodcroft, in Morphett Vale, South Australia

== Heritage listings ==
=== State ===
The building was listed on the South Australian Heritage Register on 11 September 1986.

=== National ===
The building was listed on the now-defunct Register of the National Estate on 21 October 1980. The listing described both the building and its significance as follows:

The first church in South Australia. The original structure built 1838, rebuilt and enlarged 1844-45 rebuilt 1888 (raised tower and extensions E J Woods arch; only the lower parts of the present nave and tower date from 1838 (foundation stone laid 26 January 1838). The clock was made in 1836 for South Australia by Vulliamy, clockmaker to King William IV. The church includes the William IV Window, supposed to be the earliest window in South Australia, having been brought out in 1836 with the prefabricated structure intended as the first church.

Historically very significant as it contains elements of the earliest surviving ecclesiastical building in South Australia. The church has been associated with many important events since the first years of colony. Of special note is the William IV window which was brought to Adelaide in the first year of the colony. Probably the oldest surviving window in South Australia.
