= Lewis Cohen (mayor) =

Australian politician (1849-1933)

Sir Lewis Cohen
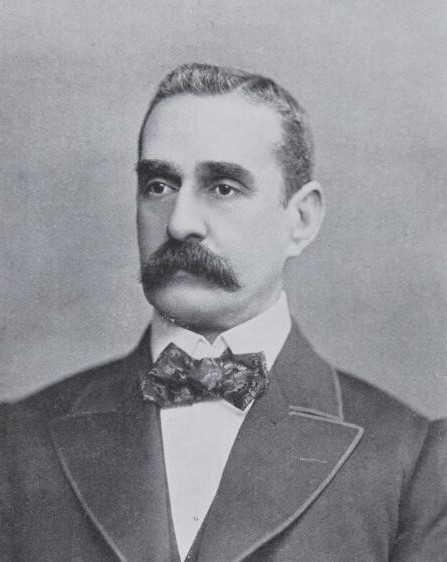

Mayor of Adelaide
- In office 1889–1890, 1901–1904, 1909–1911, 1921–1923

Member of the South Australian House of Assembly for Adelaide
- In office 1902–1906

Member of the South Australian House of Assembly for North Adelaide
- In office 1887–1893

Personal details
- Born: 23 December 1849 Liverpool, UK
- Died: 24 June 1933 (aged 83)

Sir Lewis Cohen (23 December 1849 – 24 June 1933) was a businessman who was a Member of the South Australian Parliament for 10 years and served on the Adelaide City Council for 30 years. He was Mayor of Adelaide 1889–1890, 1901–1904, and 1909–1911, and then Lord Mayor 1921–1923. He was knighted in 1924.

== Life ==
Cohen was born in Liverpool, where his father had a clothing business. At age two he was taken with his family to Sydney to set up business there. Nine years later with the business running successfully, the family returned to England, and Lewis was sent to Jewish school at Edmonton. At age 17 he returned to Sydney and at 19, bankrolled by his father and accompanied by a friend, he set up a shop in Levuka, then capital of Fiji. He took part in public affairs there, and was elected to Levuka's first council in 1872. With his health failing, he returned to Sydney in 1873, where he remained until 1876 when on medical advice he and his wife moved to Adelaide, opening a branch of the London Discount Bank.

== Public affairs ==
- He was Member of the House of Assembly from 1887 to 1893 for North Adelaide and with the Australasian National League from 1902 to 1906 for Adelaide.
- He was a member of Adelaide City Council for 30 years and Mayor from 1901 to 1904, Lord Mayor from 1921 to 1923, and in 1911 represented the City of Adelaide at the coronation of King George V and was responsible for upgrading the position to that of Lord Mayor.
- He was Chief Magistrate for 7 years.
- He was a member of the Municipal Tramways Trust for 7 years.
- In 1879 he was elected president and treasurer of the Adelaide Hebrew Congregation.
- He was involved with several Friendly Societies and served as Grand President of the Druids for several years.

== Family ==
He married Selina Marks in Melbourne on 9 April 1873. Their children were:

- Henry Jessel (1874–1942)
- Hannah Maud Cohen (1876–13 June 1958), married Harrie Walter Bridgland (31 May 1879 – 17 October 1947) at Claremont, Western Australia on 31 March 1907. Bridgland, a champion swimmer, was the adopted son of Vaiben Louis Solomon. Their son Walter Lewis "Wally" Bridgland (23 March 1908 – 30 July 1987), also a champion swimmer, was also Lord Mayor of Adelaide 1966–1968.
- Mark Victor Napoleon (1878–1926)
- Horace Alan Louis (1880–1900)
- Jessel Rupert (1882–1948)
- Gladys Elizabeth Cohen (1885–1966), married Ralph Krantz in Adelaide on 16 Aug 1905

== Recognition ==
A north–south road through the south park lands of Adelaide linking to Greenhill Road, South Terrace and Morphett Street is named in his honour.
