= Joseph Harper (horse breeder) =

Australian horse breeder

Joseph Harper was an Australian horse breeder.

Harper traveled overland from Sydney to Melbourne in 1843. He established a business as a wheelwright in Lonsdale Street, which he sold some years later and moved to Woodend where he built and opened the Woodend Hotel in 1852. Subsequently, he purchased a large tract of land to develop a stud farm, Snugborough Park on Tylden Road.

Harper proved to be a capable stud farmer and horse breeder to the extent that one of his horses, Banker won the 1863 Melbourne Cup and the Victorian Cup two days later. Banker was a younger brother of the horse Barwon that also ran in the 1863 Melbourne Cup but had finished fourth. Barwon had won the 1862 Victoria Derby, the 1863 VRC St Leger and the Australian Cup in 1861.

Such was the joy of the local folk at having not just a Melbourne Cup winner come from the area but also another who had run successfully in a number of well-known races, that a public dinner was held to celebrate and toast Harper, the mayor of Woodend and owner of the horse.
