= List of mayors and lord mayors of Adelaide =

Lord Mayor of Adelaide

- Incumbent; Jane Lomax-Smith since November 2022
- Style: The Right Honourable the Lord Mayor of Adelaide
- Type: Lord Mayor
- Member of: Adelaide City Council
- Seat: Adelaide, South Australia
- Appointer: Electors: City of Adelaide
- Term length: 4 years (Renewable indefinitely)
- Constituting instrument: City of Adelaide Act 1998 (SA) s 21
- Precursor: Mayor of the City of Adelaide (1840-1919)
- Formation: October 1919
- First holder: James Hurtle Fisher (as Mayor); Charles Richmond Glover (as Lord Mayor)
- Deputy: Deputy Lord Mayor
- Salary: $195,851 (2022)
- Website: Lord Mayor's Website

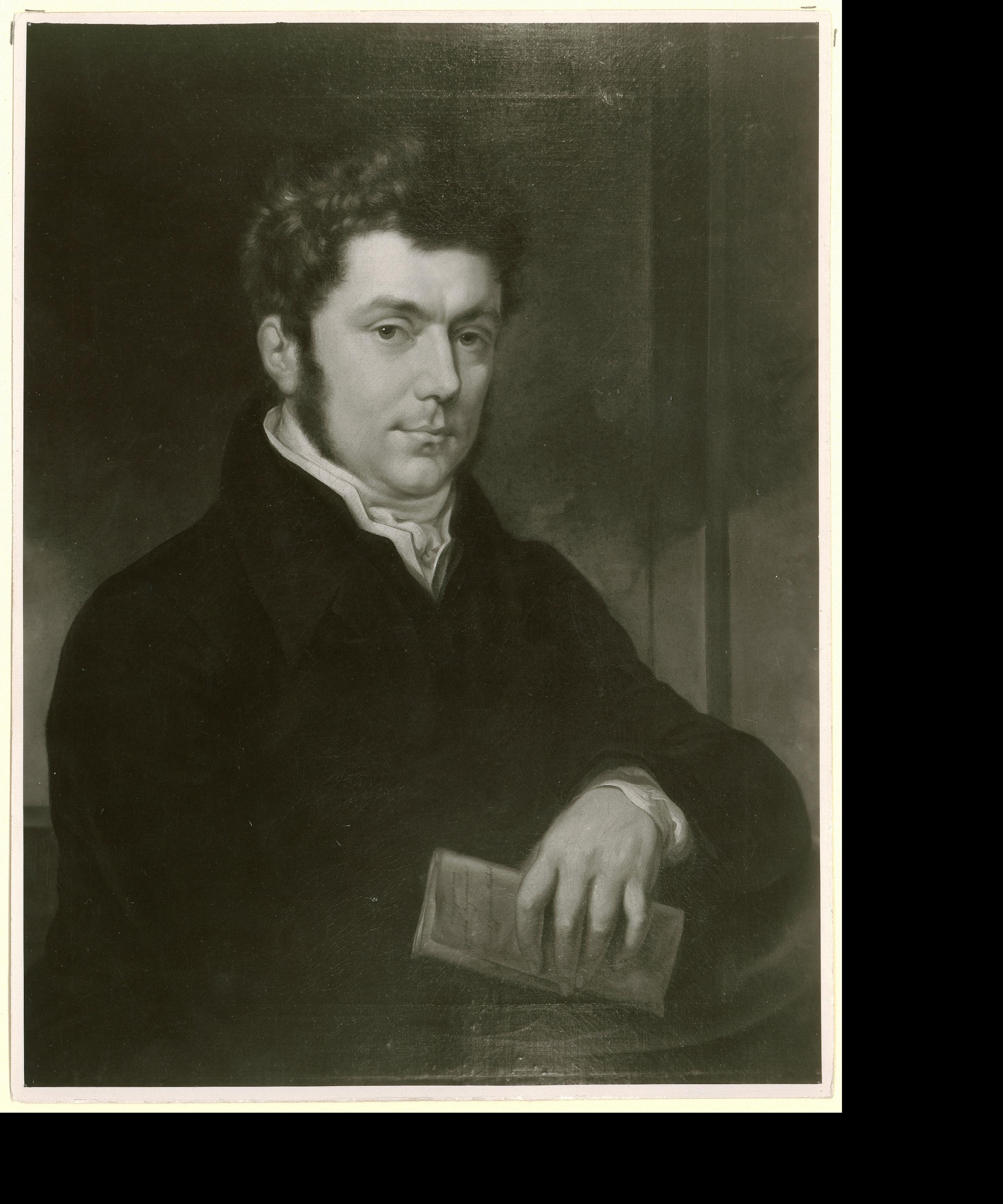
First Adelaide Mayor James Hurtle Fisher ca. 1840

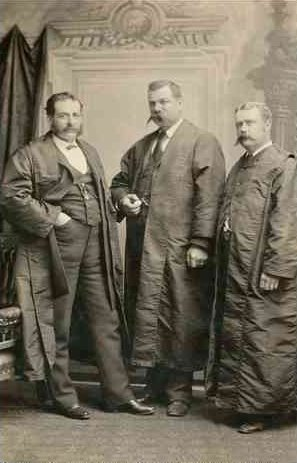
Three Aldermen who also served as Mayor: Judah Moss Solomon (1869–71); James Shaw (1888–9); Frederick Bullock (1891–2) ca. 1880

This is a list of the mayors and lord mayors of the City of Adelaide, a local government area of South Australia.

The first local government in Australia was formed on 31 October 1840 with the election of nineteen councillors to the new Adelaide Corporation, followed by the councillors' election of a mayor. The first mayor was James Hurtle Fisher and the first council meeting was held on 4 November 1840.

== Mayors (1840–1919) ==
Mayoral Order	Mayor	Term	Image
1	James Hurtle Fisher	1840–1842	
2	Thomas Wilson	1842–1843	
3	City managed as Government Department	1843–1849	
4	City managed by Commissioners	1849–1852	
5	James Hurtle Fisher	1852	
6	James Hurtle Fisher	1852–1854	
7	Joseph Hall	1854–1855	
8	John Lazar	1855–1858	
9	William Sabben	1858–1859	
10	Edmund William Wright	1859	
11	Edward Glandfield	1859–1862	
12	Thomas English	1862–1863	
13	Samuel Goode	1863–1864	
14	William Townsend	1864–1866	
15	Henry Robert Fuller	1866–1869	
16	Judah Moss Solomon	1869–1871	
17	Adolph Heinrich Friedrich Bartels	1871–1873	
18	William Dixon Allott	1873–1874	
19	John Colton	1874–1875	
20	Caleb Peacock	1875–1877	
21	Henry Scott	1877–1878	
22	William Christie Buik	1878–1879	
23	Edwin Thomas Smith	1879–1882	
24	Henry Robert Fuller	1882–1883	
25	William Bundey	1883–1886	
26	Edwin Thomas Smith	1886–1887	
27	Sir Edwin Thomas Smith	1887–1888	
28	James Shaw	1888–1889	
29	Lewis Cohen	1889–1890	
30	Frederick William Bullock	1891–1892	
31	Charles Willcox	1892–1894	
32	Charles Tucker	1894–1898	
33	Arthur Wellington Ware	1898–1901	
34	Lewis Cohen	1901–1904	
35	Theodore Bruce	1904–1907	
36	Frank Johnson	1907–1909	
37	Lewis Cohen	1909–1911	
38	Sir John Lavington Bonython	1911–1913	
39	Alfred Allen Simpson	1913–1915	
40	Isaac Isaacs	1915–1917	
41	Charles Richmond Glover	1917–1919	

== Lord mayors (since 1919) ==
The Official styled title of the Lord Mayor of Adelaide is The Right Honourable Lord Mayor of Adelaide.

The styled title The Right Honourable, (which has no connection with the privy council) attaches to the title of Lord Mayor, and not to their names, and is relinquished upon leaving office.

Lord Mayoral Order	Mayoral Order	Lord Mayor	Term	Image
1	41	Charles Richmond Glover	1919	
2	42	Frank Beaumont Moulden	1919–1921	
3	43	Lewis Cohen	1921–1923	
4	44	Charles Richmond Glover	1923–1925	
5	45	Wallace Bruce	1925–1927	
6	46	Sir John Lavington Bonython	1927–1930	
7	47	Charles Richmond Glover	1930–1933	
8	48	Jonathan Robert Cain	1933–1937	
9	49	Arthur Barrett	1937–1941	
10	50	Arden Seymour Hawker	1941–1943	
11	51	Reginald Walker	1943–1946	
12	52	John McLeay	1946–1949	
13	53	Arthur Ernest William Short	1949	
14	54	John McLeay	1949–1950	
15	55	Arthur Rymill	1950–1953	
16	56	John Scott Philps	1954–1957	
17	57	Lancelot Morton Spiller Hargrave	1957–1960	
18	58	Charles John Glover, Sir John Glover	1960–1963	
19	59	James Campbell Irwin	1963–1966	
20	60	Walter Lewis Bridgland	1966–1968	
21	61	Robert Evelyn Porter	1968–1971	
22	62	William Hubert Hayes	1971–1973	
23	63	Robert Wyndham Clampett	1973–1975	
24	64	John Justin Roche	1975–1977	
25	65	George Joseph	1977–1979	
26	66	James Vincent Seaton Bowen	1979–1981	
27	67	Arthur John Watson	1981–1983	
28	68	Wendy Chapman	1983–1985	
29	69	James Bickford Jarvis	1985–1987	
30	70	Steve Condous	1987–1993	
31	71	Henry Jacques Ninio	1993–1997	
31	72	Jane Lomax-Smith	1997–2000	
33	73	Alfred Huang	2000–2003	
34	74	Michael Harbison	2003–2010	
35	75	Stephen Yarwood	2010–2014	
36	76	Martin Haese	2014–2018	
37	77	Sandy Verschoor	2018–2022	
38	78	Jane Lomax-Smith	2022–present	

== See also ==
- City of Adelaide
- Adelaide city centre
