= Candidates of the 1975 South Australian state election =

The 1975 South Australian state election was held on 12 July 1975.

Since the previous election, the Liberal and Country League had formally become the South Australian branch of the Liberal Party. However, the breakaway Liberal Movement also contested the election with several sitting members. Seats won by the LCL in 1973 are listed below as Liberal-held, except for Goyder which had been won by the LM at a by-election.

== Retiring Members ==
=== Labor ===
- Ernie Crimes MHA (Spence)
- Len King MHA (Coles)
- Dave McKee MHA (Pirie)
- John Ryan MHA (Price)
- Alfred Kneebone MLC
- Bert Shard MLC

=== Liberal ===
- William McAnaney MHA (Heysen)
- Sir Lyell McEwin MLC
- Sir Arthur Rymill MLC
- Victor Springett MLC

== House of Assembly ==
Sitting members are shown in bold text. Successful candidates are highlighted in the relevant colour. Where there is possible confusion, an asterisk (*) is also used.

Electorate	Held by	Labor candidate	Liberal candidate	LM candidate	Other candidates
Adelaide	Labor	**Jack Wright**	David Mount	Robert Hercus	
Albert Park	Labor	**Charles Harrison**	Barry Savage	Philip Sutton	
Alexandra	Liberal	Ruth Newell	**Ted Chapman**	Donald Glazbrook	George Graham (NCP)
Ascot Park	Labor	**Geoff Virgo**	George Basisovs	Dorothy Heide	
Bragg	Liberal	Florence Pens	**David Tonkin**	Ross Thomas	
Brighton	Labor	**Hugh Hudson**	Ursula Pridham	Ronald Moulds	Sydney Monks (Ind)
Chaffey	Liberal	John Hooper	**Peter Arnold**	Jack Seekamp	
Coles	Labor	**Des Corcoran**	Peter Lewis	Lawrence Titheradge	
Davenport	Liberal	Mark Pickhaver	**Dean Brown**	Lawrence Delroy	
Elizabeth	Labor	**Peter Duncan**	Geoffrey Crome	Shirley Liddiard	
Eyre	Liberal	David Uzzell	**Graham Gunn**		William Hitchcock (NCP)
Fisher	Liberal	Geoffrey Anderson	**Stan Evans**	Maxwell Hall	William Donnon (NCP); Ingrid Temple (AP)
Flinders	NCP	Maxwell Glenn	Ilimar Tohver	William Turner	**Peter Blacker** (NCP)
Florey	Labor	**Charles Wells**	Glyndwr Morgan	Edward Smith	
Frome	Liberal	James Reese	**Ernest Allen**	David Sara	
Gilles	Labor	**Jack Slater**	Louis Ravesi	Norman Wilson	Maxwell Clifton (NCP)
Glenelg	Liberal	Brian Crawford	**John Mathwin**	Peter Heysen	
Gouger	Liberal	Peter Dewhurst	**Keith Russack**	Desmond Ross	Donald Herriman (NCP)
Goyder	LM	Irene Krastev	Maurice Schulz	**David Boundy**	Richard Kitto (NCP)
Hanson	Liberal	Terry Groom	**Heini Becker**	Graham Slape	
Henley Beach	Labor	**Glen Broomhill**	John Rogers	Trevor Vivian	
Heysen	Liberal	Myles McCallum	David Wotton	Terence McAnaney	Howard Houck (AP)
Kavel	Liberal	Roy Hobden	**Roger Goldsworthy**	Roger Teusner	Eric Bartsch (NCP); Harold Booth (NCP)
Light	Liberal	Douglas Harrison	**Bruce Eastick**	John Lienert	
Mallee	Liberal	Ronald Maczkowiack	**Bill Nankivell**	William McConnell	John Petch (NCP)
Mawson	Labor	**Don Hopgood**	Neil Bannister	Rodney Adam	
Millicent	Labor	Brian Corcoran	Murray Vandepeer	Brian Prowse	John Clark (Ind); Donald Ferguson (NCP)
Mitcham	Liberal	Sean Dawes	Graham Callister	**Robin Millhouse**	
Mitchell	Labor	**Ron Payne**	Robert Alcock	Peter Amor	
Mount Gambier	Labor	**Allan Burdon**	Harold Allison	Brian O'Connor	Alwin Crafter (NCP); Neville Ferguson (Ind); Lloyd Hobbs (Ind)
Murray	Liberal	Harold McLaren	**Ivon Wardle**	Darian Monjean	Beryl Moreton (NCP); John Potts (Ind)
Norwood	Labor	**Don Dunstan**	Barry Briegel	Frank Mercorella	
Peake	Labor	**Don Simmons**	Mark Tregoning	Desmond Moran	
Pirie	Labor	John Phelan	Alan Beste		Ted Connelly* (Ind); Raymond Fullgrabe (Ind); John Hutchins (NCP)
Playford	Labor	**Terry McRae**	Peter Shurven	Dennis Paul	Reginald Hewitt (NCP)
Price	Labor	George Whitten	Terence Hanson	Jean Lawrie	
Rocky River	Liberal	Hank Van Galen	**Howard Venning**	Clement Hampton	Ian Bruce (NCP)
Ross Smith	Labor	**Jack Jennings**	James Porter	Noel Hodges	
Salisbury	Labor	**Reg Groth**	Lancelot Chaplin	Ronald Woods	
Semaphore	Labor	**Jack Olson**	Willem Van Wyk	Rodney Sporn	
Spence	Labor	Roy Abbott	Anthony Hutton	Patrick Carlin	
Stuart	Labor	**Gavin Keneally**	Brian Kinnear	Brenda Groves	
Tea Tree Gully	Labor	**Molly Byrne**	Robert Sloane	John Hincksman	Barry Leaver (NCP); Emily Perry (Ind)
Torrens	Liberal	Nick Bolkus	**John Coumbe**	Brian Billard	
Unley	Labor	**Gil Langley**	Ronald Berryman	Bruce Wark	
Victoria	Liberal	Jean Hillier	**Allan Rodda**	Colin Hall	Graham Carrick (NCP)
Whyalla	Labor	**Max Brown**	Martinus Vette	Arnold Eckersley	

== Legislative Council ==
Sitting members are shown in bold text. Tickets that elected at least one MLC are highlighted in the relevant colour. Successful candidates are identified by an asterisk (*). Eleven seats were up for election. This was the first time the Legislative Council had been elected as a whole state by proportional representation; two Labor and seven Liberal MLCs up for re-election, as well as an LM member.

Labor candidates	Liberal candidates	LM candidates	NCP candidates	Australia candidates	Family Movt candidates
1. Norm Foster*; 2. Jim Dunford*; 3. Anne Levy*; 4. Frank Blevins*; 5. John Cornwall*; 6. Chris Sumner*; 7. Terry Hemmings	1. **Murray Hill***; 2. Don Laidlaw*; 3. **Boyd Dawkins***; 4. **Gordon Gilfillan**; 5. Graham Hancock; 6. Judith Roberts; 7. **Ross Story**	1. **Martin Cameron***; 2. John Carnie*; 3. Richard Clampett; 4. Charles Groves; 5. Janine Haines; 6. Peter Adamson	1. Lester James; 2. Richard Morris; 3. George Olesnicky	1. Mark Lainio; 2. David Middleton; 3. Colyn Van Reenen	1. John Court; 2. Raymond Kidney
Free Enterprise candidates	Ungrouped candidates				
1. Marcus Dodd; 2. William Forster; 3. Robert Hill; 4. Frederick Koop	Mark Higgs (Ind); Alan Miller (SPA)				
