= Results of the 1975 South Australian state election (House of Assembly) =

South Australian state election, 12 July 1975 House of Assembly << 1973–1977 >>
Enrolled voters	771,414				
Votes cast	721,770		Turnout	93.56%	-0.64%
Informal votes	27,785		Informal	3.85%	-0.23%
Summary of votes by party
Party	Primary votes	%	Swing	Seats	Change
Labor	321,481	46.32%	-5.20%	23	3
Liberal	218,820	31.53%	–8.26%	20	± 0
Liberal Movement	126,820	18.27%	*	2	+ 2
National Country	19,208	2.77%	-1.18%	1	± 0
Independent	6,281	0.91%	-3.41%	1	+ 1
Other	1,375	0.20%	*	0	± 0
Total	693,985			47	
Two-party-preferred
Labor		49.20%	-5.30%		
Liberal		50.80%	+5.30%		

This is a list of House of Assembly results for the 1975 South Australian state election.

== Results by electoral district ==
=== Adelaide ===
1975 South Australian state election: Adelaide
Party	Candidate	Votes	%	±%
Labor	Jack Wright	9,048	60.3	−6.4
Liberal	David Mount	3,146	21.0	−12.3
Liberal Movement	Robert Hercus	2,812	18.7	+18.7
Total formal votes		15,006	94.1	−0.5
Informal votes		934	5.9	+0.5
Turnout		15,940	91.2	−1.7
Two-party-preferred result
Labor	Jack Wright	9,334	62.2	−4.5
Liberal	David Mount	5,672	37.8	+4.5
Labor hold		Swing	−4.5	

=== Albert Park ===
1975 South Australian state election: Albert Park
Party	Candidate	Votes	%	±%
Labor	Charles Harrison	10,095	61.9	−9.8
Liberal	Barry Savage	3,744	23.0	−5.3
Liberal Movement	Philip Sutton	2,471	15.1	+15.1
Total formal votes		16,310	94.4	−0.1
Informal votes		972	5.6	+0.1
Turnout		17,282	93.3	−1.6
Two-party-preferred result
Labor	Charles Harrison	10,341	63.4	−8.3
Liberal	Barry Savage	5,969	36.6	+8.3
Labor hold		Swing	−8.3	

=== Alexandra ===
1975 South Australian state election: Alexandra
Party	Candidate	Votes	%	±%
Liberal	Ted Chapman	6,270	52.6	+2.3
Liberal Movement	Donald Glazbrook	2,775	23.3	+23.3
Labor	Ruth Newell	2,447	20.5	+20.5
National	George Graham	435	3.6	−30.3
Total formal votes		11,927	97.6	+2.5
Informal votes		297	2.4	−2.5
Turnout		12,224	93.5	−2.0
Two-party-preferred result
Liberal	Ted Chapman	9,160	76.8	+6.9
Labor	Ruth Newell	2,767	23.2	+23.2
Liberal hold		Swing	N/A	

- The two candidate preferred vote was not counted between the Liberal and Liberal Movement candidates for Alexandra.

=== Ascot Park ===
1975 South Australian state election: Ascot Park
Party	Candidate	Votes	%	±%
Labor	Geoff Virgo	8,925	58.1	−6.6
Liberal	George Basisovs	3,649	23.8	−11.5
Liberal Movement	Dorothy Heide	2,787	18.1	+18.1
Total formal votes		15,361	96.5	−0.2
Informal votes		558	3.5	+0.2
Turnout		15,919	94.2	−0.6
Two-party-preferred result
Labor	Geoff Virgo	9,201	59.9	−4.8
Liberal	George Basisovs	6,160	40.1	+4.8
Labor hold		Swing	−4.8	

=== Bragg ===
1975 South Australian state election: Bragg
Party	Candidate	Votes	%	±%
Liberal	David Tonkin	7,596	52.0	−14.4
Labor	Florence Pens	4,067	27.8	−5.8
Liberal Movement	Ross Thomas	2,948	20.2	+20.2
Total formal votes		14,611	97.2	−0.1
Informal votes		415	2.8	+0.1
Turnout		15,026	91.8	−1.7
Two-party-preferred result
Liberal	David Tonkin	10,242	70.1	+3.7
Labor	Florence Pens	4,369	29.9	−3.7
Liberal hold		Swing	+3.7	

=== Brighton ===
1975 South Australian state election: Brighton
Party	Candidate	Votes	%	±%
Labor	Hugh Hudson	9,394	51.3	−8.8
Liberal	Ursula Pridham	4,394	24.0	−12.0
Liberal Movement	Ronald Moulds	4,169	22.8	+22.8
Independent	Sydney Monks	342	1.9	+1.9
Total formal votes		18,299	97.3	−0.8
Informal votes		333	1.9	+0.8
Turnout		18,814	94.1	−0.8
Two-party-preferred result
Labor	Hugh Hudson	9,845	53.8	−8.2
Liberal	Ursula Pridham	8,454	46.2	+8.2
Labor hold		Swing	−8.2	

=== Chaffey ===
1975 South Australian state election: Chaffey
Party	Candidate	Votes	%	±%
Liberal	Peter Arnold	6,281	55.9	+2.4
Labor	John Hooper	3,562	31.7	−14.8
Liberal Movement	Jack Seekamp	1,391	12.4	+12.4
Total formal votes		11,234	96.4	−1.4
Informal votes		418	3.6	+1.4
Turnout		11,652	93.8	−1.4
Two-party-preferred result
Liberal	Peter Arnold	7,538	67.1	+13.5
Labor	John Hooper	3,696	32.9	−13.5
Liberal hold		Swing	+13.5	

=== Coles ===
1975 South Australian state election: Coles
Party	Candidate	Votes	%	±%
Labor	Des Corcoran	10,010	52.4	−6.8
Liberal	Peter Lewis	5,739	30.0	−10.8
Liberal Movement	Lawrence Titheradge	3,352	17.6	+17.6
Total formal votes		19,101	96.0	−0.7
Informal votes		791	4.0	+0.7
Turnout		19,892	94.7	−0.7
Two-party-preferred result
Labor	Des Corcoran	10,353	54.2	−5.0
Liberal	Peter Lewis	8,748	45.8	+5.0
Labor hold		Swing	−5.0	

=== Davenport ===
1975 South Australian state election: Davenport
Party	Candidate	Votes	%	±%
Liberal	Dean Brown	9,293	52.8	−15.4
Labor	Mark Pickhaver	4,496	25.6	−6.2
Liberal Movement	Lawrence Delroy	3,809	21.6	+21.6
Total formal votes		17,598	97.7	+0.2
Informal votes		408	2.3	−0.2
Turnout		18,006	93.4	−0.6
Two-party-preferred result
Liberal	Dean Brown	12,723	72.3	+4.1
Labor	Mark Pickhaver	4,875	27.7	−4.1
Liberal hold		Swing	+4.1	

=== Elizabeth ===
1975 South Australian state election: Elizabeth
Party	Candidate	Votes	%	±%
Labor	Peter Duncan	11,619	68.2	+3.2
Liberal	Geoffrey Crome	3,022	17.7	−3.6
Liberal Movement	Shirley Liddiard	2,399	14.1	+14.1
Total formal votes		17,040	94.4	−1.7
Informal votes		1,013	5.6	+1.7
Turnout		18,053	92.1	+0.6
Two-party-preferred result
Labor	Peter Duncan	11,860	69.6	0.0
Liberal	Geoffrey Crome	5,180	30.4	0.0
Labor hold		Swing	0.0	

=== Eyre ===
1975 South Australian state election: Eyre
Party	Candidate	Votes	%	±%
Liberal	Graham Gunn	6,478	73.8	+1.2
Labor	David Uzzell	1,764	20.1	−7.3
National	William Hitchcock	532	6.1	+6.1
Total formal votes		8,774	97.4	+1.3
Informal votes		230	2.6	−1.3
Turnout		9,004	89.4	+0.7
Two-party-preferred result
Liberal	Graham Gunn	6,958	79.3	+6.7
Labor	David Uzzell	1,816	20.7	−6.7
Liberal hold		Swing	+6.7	

=== Fisher ===
1975 South Australian state election: Fisher
Party	Candidate	Votes	%	±%
Liberal	Stan Evans	8,255	42.8	−16.6
Labor	Geoffrey Anderson	6,163	32.0	−8.6
Liberal Movement	Maxwell Hall	4,601	23.9	+23.9
Australia	Ingrid Temple	206	1.1	+1.1
National	William Donnon	48	0.2	+0.2
Total formal votes		19,273	98.0	+1.0
Informal votes		397	2.0	−1.0
Turnout		19,670	93.5	−0.6
Two-party-preferred result
Liberal	Stan Evans	12,806	66.4	+7.0
Labor	Geoffrey Anderson	6,467	33.6	−7.0
Liberal hold		Swing	+7.0	

=== Flinders ===
1975 South Australian state election: Flinders
Party	Candidate	Votes	%	±%
National	Peter Blacker	5,561	51.1	−3.8
Labor	Maxwell Glenn	2,475	22.7	+22.7
Liberal	Ilimar Tohver	2,398	22.0	−23.1
Liberal Movement	William Turner	448	4.1	+4.1
Total formal votes		10,882	97.3	+3.9
Informal votes		303	2.7	−3.9
Turnout		11,185	94.5	−0.5
Two-party-preferred result
National	Peter Blacker	7,802	71.7	+16.8
Labor	Maxwell Glenn	3,080	28.3	+28.3
National hold		Swing	N/A	

=== Florey ===
1975 South Australian state election: Florey
Party	Candidate	Votes	%	±%
Labor	Charles Wells	12,006	61.6	−8.8
Liberal	Glyndwr Morgan	4,092	21.0	−8.6
Liberal Movement	Edward Smith	3,398	17.4	+17.4
Total formal votes		19,496	95.0	0.0
Informal votes		1,029	5.0	0.0
Turnout		20,525	93.9	−0.7
Two-party-preferred result
Labor	Charles Wells	12,341	63.3	−7.1
Liberal	Glyndwr Morgan	7,155	36.7	+7.1
Labor hold		Swing	−7.1	

=== Frome ===
1975 South Australian state election: Frome
Party	Candidate	Votes	%	±%
Liberal	Ernest Allen	4,242	55.3	−5.6
Labor	James Reese	2,638	34.4	−4.7
Liberal Movement	David Sara	785	10.2	+10.2
Total formal votes		7,665	97.2	+0.1
Informal votes		224	2.8	−0.1
Turnout		7,889	91.6	−1.9
Two-party-preferred result
Liberal	Ernest Allen	4,952	64.6	+3.7
Labor	James Reese	2,713	35.4	−3.7
Liberal hold		Swing	+3.7	

=== Gilles ===
1975 South Australian state election: Gilles
Party	Candidate	Votes	%	±%
Labor	Jack Slater	8,626	50.4	−5.4
Liberal	Louis Ravesi	4,333	25.3	−18.9
Liberal Movement	Norman Wilson	3,900	22.8	+22.8
National	Maxwell Clifton	265	1.5	+1.5
Total formal votes		17,124	95.5	−1.0
Informal votes		815	4.5	+1.0
Turnout		17,939	93.5	−1.3
Two-party-preferred result
Labor	Jack Slater	9,041	52.8	−3.0
Liberal	Louis Ravesi	8,083	47.2	+3.0
Labor hold		Swing	−3.0	

=== Glenelg ===
1975 South Australian state election: Glenelg
Party	Candidate	Votes	%	±%
Labor	Brian Crawford	6,706	39.8	−7.5
Liberal	John Mathwin	6,429	38.1	−14.6
Liberal Movement	Peter Heysen	3,728	22.1	+22.1
Total formal votes		16,863	97.2	−0.6
Informal votes		490	2.8	+0.6
Turnout		17,353	93.0	−1.3
Two-party-preferred result
Liberal	John Mathwin	9,766	57.9	+5.2
Labor	Brian Crawford	7,096	42.1	−5.2
Liberal hold		Swing	+5.2	

=== Gouger ===
1975 South Australian state election: Gouger
Party	Candidate	Votes	%	±%
Liberal	Keith Russack	4,580	46.5	−1.8
Labor	Peter Dewhurst	3,055	31.0	0.0
Liberal Movement	Desmond Ross	1,750	17.8	+17.8
National	Donald Herriman	465	4.7	−10.7
Total formal votes		9,850	98.1	+0.2
Informal votes		189	1.9	−0.2
Turnout		10,039	94.8	−0.5
Two-party-preferred result
Liberal	Keith Russack	6,560	66.6	+2.7
Labor	Peter Dewhurst	3,290	33.4	−2.7
Liberal hold		Swing	+2.7	

=== Goyder ===
1975 South Australian state election: Goyder
Party	Candidate	Votes	%	±%
Liberal Movement	David Boundy	4,563	45.4	+45.4
Liberal	Maurice Schulz	3,166	31.5	−20.0
Labor	Irene Krastev	1,811	18.0	+18.0
National	Richard Kitto	510	5.1	−25.8
Total formal votes		10,050	97.5	+2.5
Informal votes		260	2.5	−2.5
Turnout		10,310	95.7	−0.5
Two-candidate-preferred result
Liberal Movement	David Boundy	6,387	63.6	+63.6
Liberal	Maurice Schulz	3,663	36.4	−37.2
Liberal Movement hold		Swing	N/A	

=== Hanson ===
1975 South Australian state election: Hanson
Party	Candidate	Votes	%	±%
Labor	Terry Groom	7,440	42.1	−5.5
Liberal	Heini Becker	7,232	40.9	−11.5
Liberal Movement	Graham Slape	3,017	17.0	+17.0
Total formal votes		17,689	96.5	−1.8
Informal votes		636	3.5	+1.8
Turnout		18,325	92.6	−2.2
Two-party-preferred result
Liberal	Heini Becker	9,844	55.7	+3.3
Labor	Terry Groom	8,184	47.6	−3.3
Liberal hold		Swing	+3.3	

=== Henley Beach ===
1975 South Australian state election: Henley Beach
Party	Candidate	Votes	%	±%
Labor	Glen Broomhill	9,780	52.3	−4.7
Liberal	John Rogers	5,845	31.3	−2.1
Liberal Movement	Trevor Vivian	3,057	16.4	+16.4
Total formal votes		18,682	96.1	−0.7
Informal votes		754	3.9	+0.7
Turnout		19,436	93.7	
Two-party-preferred result
Labor	Glen Broomhill	10,088	54.0	−6.2
Liberal	John Rogers	8,594	46.0	+6.2
Labor hold		Swing	−6.2	

=== Heysen ===
1975 South Australian state election: Heysen
Party	Candidate	Votes	%	±%
Liberal	David Wotton	5,588	47.5	−25.5
Liberal Movement	Terence McAnaney	3,124	26.6	+26.6
Labor	Myles McCallum	2,690	22.9	−4.1
Australia	Howard Houck	357	3.0	+3.0
Total formal votes		11,759	97.2	+3.7
Informal votes		333	2.8	−3.7
Turnout		12,092	93.5	−0.8
Two-candidate-preferred result
Liberal	David Wotton	7,626	64.8	−8.2
Liberal Movement	Terence McAnaney	4,133	35.2	+35.2
Liberal hold		Swing	N/A	

=== Kavel ===
1975 South Australian state election: Kavel
Party	Candidate	Votes	%	±%
Liberal	Roger Goldsworthy	5,292	52.4	−3.4
Liberal Movement	Roger Teusner	2,418	24.0	+24.0
Labor	Roy Hobden	1,854	18.4	−9.4
National	Eric Bartsch	477	4.7	−11.7
National	Harold Booth	50	0.5	+0.5
Total formal votes		10,091	97.6	−0.1
Informal votes		253	2.4	+0.1
Turnout		10,344	95.3	−0.7
Two-party-preferred result
Liberal	Roger Goldsworthy	7,942	78.7	+8.7
Labor	Roy Hobden	2,149	21.3	−8.7
Liberal hold		Swing	+8.7	

- The two candidate preferred vote was not counted between the Liberal and Liberal Movement candidates for Kavel.

=== Light ===
1975 South Australian state election: Light
Party	Candidate	Votes	%	±%
Liberal	Bruce Eastick	5,211	46.7	−15.4
Labor	Douglas Harrison	3,684	33.0	−1.9
Liberal Movement	John Lienert	2,260	20.3	+20.3
Total formal votes		11,155	96.8	−0.2
Informal votes		364	3.2	+0.2
Turnout		11,519	94.4	−1.2
Two-party-preferred result
Liberal	Bruce Eastick	7,019	62.9	−0.7
Labor	Douglas Harrison	4,136	37.1	+0.7
Liberal hold		Swing	−0.7	

=== Mallee ===
1975 South Australian state election: Mallee
Party	Candidate	Votes	%	±%
Liberal	Bill Nankivell	5,040	50.2	−3.0
National	John Petch	2,443	24.3	−22.5
Labor	Ronald Maczkowiack	1,509	15.0	+15.0
Liberal Movement	William McConnell	1,046	10.4	+10.4
Total formal votes		10,038	98.1	+3.5
Informal votes		193	1.9	−3.5
Turnout		10,231	95.0	−0.7
Two-party-preferred result
Liberal	Bill Nankivell	8,181	81.5	+28.3
Labor	Ronald Maczkowiack	1,857	18.5	+18.5
Liberal hold		Swing	N/A	

- The two candidate preferred vote was not counted between the Liberal and Country candidates for Mallee.

=== Mawson ===
1975 South Australian state election: Mawson
Party	Candidate	Votes	%	±%
Labor	Don Hopgood	16,051	53.0	−8.6
Liberal Movement	Rodney Adam	8,110	26.7	+26.7
Liberal	Neil Bannister	6,149	20.3	−14.4
Total formal votes		30,310	96.4	−0.4
Informal votes		1,125	3.6	+0.4
Turnout		31,435	94.0	0.0
Two-candidate-preferred result
Labor	Don Hopgood	16,852	55.6	−8.5
Liberal Movement	Rodney Adam	13,458	44.4	+44.4
Labor hold		Swing	N/A	

=== Millicent ===
1975 South Australian state election: Millicent
Party	Candidate	Votes	%	±%
Liberal	Murray Vandepeer	4,195	38.8	−4.7
Labor	Brian Corcoran	3,963	36.6	−19.9
National	Donald Ferguson	2,014	18.6	+18.6
Liberal Movement	Brian Prowse	535	5.0	+5.0
Independent	John Clark	108	1.0	+1.0
Total formal votes		10,815	97.6	−0.9
Informal votes		265	2.4	+0.9
Turnout		11,080	95.5	−0.7
Two-party-preferred result
Liberal	Murray Vandepeer	6,482	59.9	+16.4
Labor	Brian Corcoran	4,333	40.1	−16.4
Liberal gain from Labor		Swing	+16.4	

=== Mitcham ===
1975 South Australian state election: Mitcham
Party	Candidate	Votes	%	±%
Liberal Movement	Robin Millhouse	6,820	43.2	+43.2
Labor	Sean Dawes	4,602	29.1	−3.3
Liberal	Graham Callister	4,382	27.7	−34.3
Total formal votes		15,804	97.7	−0.3
Informal votes		377	2.3	+0.3
Turnout		16,181	93.3	−0.8
Two-candidate-preferred result
Liberal Movement	Robin Millhouse	10,710	67.8	+67.8
Labor	Sean Dawes	5,094	32.2	−2.1
Liberal Movement gain from Liberal		Swing	N/A	

=== Mitchell ===
1975 South Australian state election: Mitchell
Party	Candidate	Votes	%	±%
Labor	Ron Payne	8,765	54.2	−6.8
Liberal	Robert Alcock	3,883	24.9	−14.1
Liberal Movement	Peter Amor	3,537	21.9	+21.9
Total formal votes		16,185	95.8	−1.0
Informal votes		701	4.2	+1.0
Turnout		16,886	94.4	−0.1
Two-party-preferred result
Labor	Ron Payne	9,112	56.3	−4.7
Liberal	Robert Alcock	7,013	43.7	+4.7
Labor hold		Swing	−4.7	

=== Mount Gambier ===
1975 South Australian state election: Mount Gambier
Party	Candidate	Votes	%	±%
Labor	Allan Burdon	4,983	43.7	−14.9
Liberal	Harold Allison	4,084	35.8	+2.4
Independent	Lloyd Hobbs	877	7.7	+7.7
National	Alwin Crafter	755	6.6	+6.6
Liberal Movement	Brian O'Connor	604	5.3	+5.3
Independent	Neville Ferguson	110	1.0	+1.0
Total formal votes		11,413	96.7	−0.9
Informal votes		392	3.3	+0.9
Turnout		11,805	94.8	−0.2
Two-party-preferred result
Liberal	Harold Allison	5,883	51.5	+15.5
Labor	Allan Burdon	5,530	48.5	−15.5
Liberal gain from Labor		Swing	+15.5	

=== Murray ===
1975 South Australian state election: Murray
Party	Candidate	Votes	%	±%
Liberal	Ivon Wardle	6,078	54.4	−2.9
Labor	Harold McLaren	4,110	36.8	−5.9
Liberal Movement	Darian Monjean	647	5.8	+5.8
Independent	John Potts	197	1.8	+1.8
National	Beryl Moreton	137	1.2	+1.2
Total formal votes		11,169	96.9	−0.7
Informal votes		361	3.1	+0.7
Turnout		11,530	95.0	−0.9
Two-party-preferred result
Liberal	Ivon Wardle	6,925	62.0	+4.7
Labor	Harold McLaren	4,244	38.0	−4.7
Liberal hold		Swing	+4.7	

=== Norwood ===
1975 South Australian state election: Norwood
Party	Candidate	Votes	%	±%
Labor	Don Dunstan	8,643	55.6	−4.1
Liberal	Barry Briegel	4,912	31.6	−8.7
Liberal Movement	Frank Mercorella	1,980	12.8	+12.8
Total formal votes		15,535	95.1	−1.2
Informal votes		800	4.9	+1.2
Turnout		16,335	90.7	−2.2
Two-party-preferred result
Labor	Don Dunstan	8,839	56.9	−2.8
Liberal	Barry Briegel	6,696	43.1	+2.8
Labor hold		Swing	−2.8	

=== Peake ===
1975 South Australian state election: Peake
Party	Candidate	Votes	%	±%
Labor	Don Simmons	8,341	54.1	−5.5
Liberal	Mark Tregoning	3,733	24.2	−16.2
Liberal Movement	Desmond Moran	3,349	21.7	+21.7
Total formal votes		15,423	95.1	−0.5
Informal votes		802	4.9	+0.5
Turnout		16,225	93.9	−0.7
Two-party-preferred result
Labor	Don Simmons	8,683	56.3	−3.3
Liberal	Mark Tregoning	6,740	43.7	+3.3
Labor hold		Swing	−3.3	

=== Pirie ===
1975 South Australian state election: Pirie
Party	Candidate	Votes	%	±%
Independent	Ted Connelly	4,351	42.7	+42.7
Labor	John Phelan	3,508	34.4	−39.5
National	John Hutchins	1,716	16.9	+16.9
Liberal	Alan Beste	491	4.8	+4.8
Independent	Raymond Fullgrabe	119	1.2	+1.2
Total formal votes		10,185	96.7	+2.9
Informal votes		352	3.3	−2.9
Turnout		10,537	95.0	−0.4
Two-candidate-preferred result
Independent	Ted Connelly	6,506	63.9	+63.9
Labor	John Phelan	3,679	36.1	−37.8
Independent gain from Labor		Swing	N/A	

=== Playford ===
1975 South Australian state election: Playford
Party	Candidate	Votes	%	±%
Labor	Terry McRae	13,473	59.8	−5.0
Liberal Movement	Dennis Paul	4,888	21.7	+21.7
Liberal	Peter Shurven	3,434	15.3	−19.9
National	Reginald Hewitt	722	3.2	+3.2
Total formal votes		22,517	94.8	+0.6
Informal votes		1,245	5.2	−0.6
Turnout		23,762	93.5	−0.1
Two-candidate-preferred result
Labor	Terry McRae	14,028	62.3	−2.5
Liberal Movement	Dennis Paul	8,489	37.7	+37.7
Labor hold		Swing	N/A	

=== Price ===
1975 South Australian state election: Price
Party	Candidate	Votes	%	±%
Labor	George Whitten	8,944	60.6	−4.0
Liberal	Terence Hanson	3,338	22.6	−2.9
Liberal Movement	Jean Lawrie	2,474	16.8	+16.8
Total formal votes		14,756	92.9	−1.6
Informal votes		1,135	7.1	+1.6
Turnout		15,891	93.9	−0.4
Two-party-preferred result
Labor	George Whitten	9,192	62.3	−10.2
Liberal	Terence Hanson	5,563	37.7	+10.2
Labor hold		Swing	−10.2	

=== Rocky River ===
1975 South Australian state election: Rocky River
Party	Candidate	Votes	%	±%
Liberal	Howard Venning	4,151	42.2	−5.6
National	Ian Bruce	3,018	30.7	+1.5
Labor	Hank Van Galen	1,785	18.2	−4.8
Liberal Movement	Clement Hampton	878	8.9	+8.9
Total formal votes		9,832	98.0	−0.1
Informal votes		198	2.0	+0.1
Turnout		10,030	96.5	+0.6
Two-candidate-preferred result
Liberal	Howard Venning	5,984	60.9	+10.7
National	Ian Bruce	3,848	39.1	−10.7
Liberal hold		Swing	+10.7	

=== Ross Smith ===
1975 South Australian state election: Ross Smith
Party	Candidate	Votes	%	±%
Labor	Jack Jennings	9,458	65.0	−15.3
Liberal	James Porter	2,703	18.6	+18.6
Liberal Movement	Noel Hodges	2,391	16.4	+16.4
Total formal votes		14,552	93.9	+1.0
Informal votes		947	6.1	−1.0
Turnout		15,499	93.1	−1.5
Two-party-preferred result
Labor	Jack Jennings	9,692	66.6	−13.7
Liberal	James Porter	4,860	33.4	+33.4
Labor hold		Swing	N/A	

=== Salisbury ===
1975 South Australian state election: Salisbury
Party	Candidate	Votes	%	±%
Labor	Reg Groth	10,398	62.1	−21.9
Liberal	Lancelot Chaplin	3,367	20.1	+20.1
Liberal Movement	Ronald Woods	2,984	17.8	+17.8
Total formal votes		16,749	94.6	+7.8
Informal votes		947	5.4	−7.8
Turnout		17,696	92.8	−1.1
Two-party-preferred result
Labor	Reg Groth	10,703	63.9	−20.1
Liberal	Lancelot Chaplin	6,046	36.1	+36.1
Labor hold		Swing	N/A	

=== Semaphore ===
1975 South Australian state election: Semaphore
Party	Candidate	Votes	%	±%
Labor	Jack Olson	11,813	69.9	−2.8
Liberal	Willem Van Wyk	2,732	16.2	−7.4
Liberal Movement	Rodney Sporn	2,348	13.9	+13.9
Total formal votes		16,893	94.8	−0.9
Informal votes		929	5.2	+0.9
Turnout		17,822	95.1	+0.3
Two-party-preferred result
Labor	Jack Olson	12,045	71.3	−4.7
Liberal	Willem Van Wyk	4,848	28.7	+4.7
Labor hold		Swing	−4.7	

=== Spence ===
1975 South Australian state election: Spence
Party	Candidate	Votes	%	±%
Labor	Roy Abbott	10,364	71.0	−10.9
Liberal	Anthony Hutton	2,386	16.4	+16.4
Liberal Movement	Patrick Carlin	1,844	12.6	+12.6
Total formal votes		14,594	94.1	+1.4
Informal votes		921	5.9	−1.4
Turnout		15,515	93.0	−1.8
Two-party-preferred result
Labor	Roy Abbott	10,551	72.3	−9.6
Liberal	Anthony Hutton	4,043	27.7	+27.7
Labor hold		Swing	N/A	

=== Stuart ===
1975 South Australian state election: Stuart
Party	Candidate	Votes	%	±%
Labor	Gavin Keneally	8,847	69.0	−12.2
Liberal	Brian Kinnear	2,781	21.7	+21.7
Liberal Movement	Brenda Groves	1,202	9.3	+9.3
Total formal votes		12,830	94.2	+1.3
Informal votes		794	5.8	−1.3
Turnout		13,624	92.7	+2.3
Two-party-preferred result
Labor	Gavin Keneally	8,968	69.9	−11.3
Liberal	Brian Kinnear	3,862	30.1	+30.1
Labor hold		Swing	N/A	

=== Tea Tree Gully ===
1975 South Australian state election: Tea Tree Gully
Party	Candidate	Votes	%	±%
Labor	Molly Byrne	15,331	54.2	−8.0
Liberal	Robert Sloane	6,521	23.0	−11.0
Liberal Movement	John Hincksman	6,162	21.8	+21.8
Independent	Emily Perry	177	0.6	+0.6
National	Barry Leaver	120	0.4	+0.4
Total formal votes		28,311	97.3	−0.2
Informal votes		794	2.7	+0.2
Turnout		29,105	94.6	0.0
Two-party-preferred result
Labor	Molly Byrne	16,219	57.3	−6.8
Liberal	Robert Sloane	12,092	42.7	+6.8
Labor hold		Swing	−6.8	

=== Torrens ===
1975 South Australian state election: Torrens
Party	Candidate	Votes	%	±%
Labor	Nick Bolkus	6,266	40.4	−4.4
Liberal	John Coumbe	6,144	39.8	−15.4
Liberal Movement	Brian Billard	3,049	19.8	+19.8
Total formal votes		15,419	96.9	+0.1
Informal votes		486	3.1	−0.1
Turnout		15,905	91.9	−0.9
Two-party-preferred result
Liberal	John Coumbe	8,652	56.1	+0.9
Labor	Nick Bolkus	6,767	43.9	−0.9
Liberal hold		Swing	+0.9	

=== Unley ===
1975 South Australian state election: Unley
Party	Candidate	Votes	%	±%
Labor	Gil Langley	7,579	52.1	−6.5
Liberal	Ronald Berryman	3,662	25.2	−10.2
Liberal Movement	Bruce Wark	3,295	22.7	+22.7
Total formal votes		14,536	95.7	−0.6
Informal votes		659	4.3	+0.6
Turnout		15,195	92.5	−0.5
Two-party-preferred result
Labor	Gil Langley	7,991	55.0	−6.1
Liberal	Ronald Berryman	6,545	45.0	+6.1
Labor hold		Swing	−6.1	

=== Victoria ===
1975 South Australian state election: Victoria
Party	Candidate	Votes	%	±%
Liberal	Allan Rodda	6,500	64.1	0.0
Labor	Jean Hillier	1,698	16.7	+16.7
National	Graham Carrick	1,145	11.3	−24.6
Liberal Movement	Colin Hall	796	7.9	+7.9
Total formal votes		10,139	97.6	+3.8
Informal votes		251	2.4	−3.8
Turnout		10,390	93.7	−1.0
Two-party-preferred result
Liberal	Allan Rodda	8,055	79.4	+15.3
Labor	Jean Hillier	2,084	20.6	+20.6
Liberal hold		Swing	N/A	

=== Whyalla ===
1975 South Australian state election: Whyalla
Party	Candidate	Votes	%	±%
Labor	Max Brown	6,735	66.4	−8.3
Liberal	Martinus Vette	1,879	18.5	−6.8
Liberal Movement	Arnold Eckersley	1,526	15.1	+15.1
Total formal votes		10,140	95.2	−1.5
Informal votes		513	4.8	+1.5
Turnout		10,653	92.6	+1.2
Two-party-preferred result
Labor	Max Brown	6,926	68.3	−6.4
Liberal	Martinus Vette	3,214	31.7	+6.4
Labor hold		Swing	−6.4	

== See also ==
- Candidates of the 1975 South Australian state election
- Members of the South Australian House of Assembly, 1975–1977
