= Members of the South Australian House of Assembly, 1975–1977 =

This is a list of members of the South Australian House of Assembly from 1975 to 1977, as elected at the 1975 state election:

Name	Party	Electorate	Term of office
Roy Abbott	Labor	Spence	1975–1989
Ernest Allen	Liberal	Frome	1968–1977
Harold Allison	Liberal	Mount Gambier	1975–1997
Peter Arnold	Liberal	Chaffey	1968–1970, 1973–1993
Heini Becker	Liberal	Hanson	1970–1997
Peter Blacker	Country/NCP ^{[1]}	Flinders	1973–1993
David Boundy	LM/Liberal ^{[2]}	Goyder	1974–1977
Hon Glen Broomhill	Labor	Henley Beach	1965–1979
Dean Brown	Liberal	Davenport	1973–1985, 1992–2006
Max Brown	Labor	Whyalla	1970–1985
Molly Byrne	Labor	Tea Tree Gully	1965–1979
Ted Chapman	Liberal	Alexandra	1973–1992
Ted Connelly	Independent	Pirie	1975–1977
Hon Des Corcoran	Labor	Coles	1962–1968, 1968–1982
John Coumbe	Liberal	Torrens	1956–1977
Peter Duncan	Labor	Elizabeth	1973–1984
Hon Don Dunstan	Labor	Norwood	1953–1979
Bruce Eastick	Liberal	Light	1970–1993
Stan Evans	Liberal	Fisher	1968–1993
Roger Goldsworthy	Liberal	Kavel	1970–1992
Reg Groth	Labor	Salisbury	1970–1979
Graham Gunn	Liberal	Eyre	1970–2010
Charles Harrison	Labor	Albert Park	1970–1979
Hon Dr Don Hopgood	Labor	Mawson	1970–1993
Hon Hugh Hudson	Labor	Brighton	1965–1979
Joe Jennings	Labor	Ross Smith	1953–1977
Gavin Keneally	Labor	Stuart	1970–1989
Gil Langley	Labor	Unley	1962–1982
John Mathwin	Liberal	Glenelg	1970–1985
Terry McRae	Labor	Playford	1970–1989
Robin Millhouse	LM/New LM ^{[2]}	Mitcham	1955–1982
Bill Nankivell	Liberal	Mallee	1959–1979
Jack Olson	Labor	Semaphore	1973–1979
Ron Payne	Labor	Mitchell	1970–1989
Allan Rodda	Liberal	Victoria	1965–1985
Keith Russack	Liberal	Gouger	1973–1982
Don Simmons	Labor	Peake	1970–1979
Jack Slater	Labor	Gilles	1970–1989
Dr David Tonkin	Liberal	Bragg	1970–1983
Murray Vandepeer	Liberal	Millicent	1975–1977
Howard Venning	Liberal	Rocky River	1968–1979
Hon Geoff Virgo	Labor	Ascot Park	1968–1979
Ivon Wardle	Liberal	Murray	1968–1977
Charles Wells	Labor	Florey	1970–1979
George Whitten	Labor	Price	1975–1985
David Wotton	Liberal	Heysen	1975–2002
Jack Wright	Labor	Adelaide	1971–1985

^{1} The Country Party renamed itself to the National Country Party during the course of this term..
^{2} The Liberal Movement voted to rejoin the Liberal Party in May 1976, with one of its two MHAs, David Boundy, following suit. The second MHA, Robin Millhouse, who had fiercely opposed the merger, immediately founded a new party, the New LM, and served as its sole representative in the House of Assembly.
