= Electoral results for the district of Pirie =

South Australian district election results

This is a list of election results for the electoral district of Pirie in South Australian elections.

== Members for Pirie ==
Member	Party	Term
David McKee	Labor	1970–1975
Ted Connelly	Independent	1975–1977

== Election results ==
=== Elections in the 1970s ===
1975 South Australian state election: Pirie
Party	Candidate	Votes	%	±%
Independent	Ted Connelly	4,351	42.7	+42.7
Labor	John Phelan	3,508	34.4	−39.5
National	John Hutchins	1,716	16.9	+16.9
Liberal	Alan Beste	491	4.8	+4.8
Independent	Raymond Fullgrabe	119	1.2	+1.2
Total formal votes		10,185	96.7	+2.9
Informal votes		352	3.3	−2.9
Turnout		10,537	95.0	−0.4
Two-candidate-preferred result
Independent	Ted Connelly	6,506	63.9	+63.9
Labor	John Phelan	3,679	36.1	−37.8
Independent gain from Labor		Swing	N/A	

1973 South Australian state election: Pirie
Party	Candidate	Votes	%	±%
Labor	Dave McKee	6,749	73.9	−0.7
Independent	Myles McCallum	2,385	26.1	+26.1
Total formal votes		9,134	93.8	−4.1
Informal votes		602	6.2	+4.1
Turnout		9,736	95.4	−0.9
Labor hold		Swing	N/A	

1970 South Australian state election: Pirie
Party	Candidate	Votes	%	±%
Labor	Dave McKee	7,008	74.6	
Liberal and Country	John Bailey	2,393	25.4	
Total formal votes		9,401	97.9	
Informal votes		198	2.1	
Turnout		9,599	96.3	
Labor hold		Swing		
