= Electoral results for the district of Flinders =

South Australian district election results

This is a list of electoral results for the Electoral district of Flinders in South Australian state elections from the district's first election in 1938 until the present.

== Members for Flinders ==
Member	Party	Term
Edward Craigie	Single Tax League	1938–1941
Rex Pearson	Liberal and Country League	1941–1951
Glen Pearson	Liberal and Country League	1951–1970
John Carnie	Liberal and Country League	1970–1973
Peter Blacker	Nationals SA	1973–1993
Liz Penfold	Liberal Party	1993–2010
Peter Treloar	Liberal Party	2010–2022
Sam Telfer	Liberal Party	2022-present

== Election results ==
=== Elections in the 2020s ===
==== 2026 ====
2026 South Australian state election: Flinders
Party	Candidate	Votes	%	±%
Liberal	Sam Telfer	7,232	33.8	−12.2
One Nation	Brenton Hincks	6,042	28.2	+28.2
Independent	Meghan Petherick	2,870	13.4	+13.4
Labor	Ben Anchor	1,959	9.2	−4.7
Independent	Craig Haslam	1,190	5.6	+5.6
Greens	Kathryn Hardwick-Franco	760	3.6	−1.2
National	Dylan Cowley	460	2.1	−2.0
Independent	Rod Keogh	308	1.4	+1.4
SA-Best	Thomas McNab	257	1.2	+1.2
Australian Family	Sam Fulwood	175	0.8	+0.8
Real Change	Spiro Manolakis	145	0.7	+0.7
Total formal votes		21,400	93.8	−3.0
Informal votes		1,425	6.2	+3.0
Turnout		22,825	86.5	−0.7
Two-candidate-preferred result
Liberal	Sam Telfer	12,762	59.6	+6.6
One Nation	Brenton Hincks	8,636	40.4	+40.4
Liberal hold				

==== 2022 ====
2022 South Australian state election: Flinders
Party	Candidate	Votes	%	±%
Liberal	Sam Telfer	9,743	46.0	−21.4
Independent	Liz Habermann	5,757	27.2	+27.2
Labor	Sarah Tynan	2,943	13.9	−4.0
Greens	Kathryn Hardwick-Franco	996	4.7	−2.1
National	Lillian Poynter	886	4.2	+4.2
Family First	Tracey Dalton	860	4.1	+4.1
Total formal votes		21,185	96.8	
Informal votes		698	3.2	
Turnout		21,883	87.2	
Notional two-party-preferred count
Liberal	Sam Telfer	14,901	70.3	−5.7
Labor	Sarah Tynan	6,284	29.7	+5.7
Two-candidate-preferred result
Liberal	Sam Telfer	11,224	53.0	−23.1
Independent	Liz Habermann	9,961	47.0	+47.0
Liberal hold				

Distribution of preferences: Flinders
Party	Candidate	Votes	Round 1		Round 2		Round 3		Round 4	
Party	Candidate	Votes	Dist.	Total	Dist.	Total	Dist.	Total	Dist.	Total
Quota (50% + 1)		10,593								
Liberal	Sam Telfer	9,743	+157	9,900	+117	10,017	+482	10,499	+725	11,224
Independent	Liz Habermann	5,757	+277	6,034	+456	6,490	+573	7,063	+2,898	9,961
Labor	Sarah Tynan	2,943	+76	3,019	+373	3,392	+231	3,623	Excluded	
Greens	Kathryn Hardwick-Franco	996	+77	1,073	Excluded					
National	Lillian Poynter	886	+273	1,159	+127	1,286	Excluded			
Family First	Tracey Dalton	860	Excluded							

=== Elections in the 2010s ===
==== 2018 ====
2018 South Australian state election: Flinders
Party	Candidate	Votes	%	±%
Liberal	Peter Treloar	13,565	68.2	−3.5
Labor	Julie Watson	3,598	18.1	+2.5
Greens	Ian Dudley	1,429	7.2	+0.9
Conservatives	Tony Parker	1,300	6.5	+0.2
Total formal votes		19,892	97.0	−0.6
Informal votes		606	3.0	+0.6
Turnout		20,498	90.1	+0.3
Two-party-preferred result
Liberal	Peter Treloar	15,176	76.3	−2.6
Labor	Julie Watson	4,716	23.7	+2.6
Liberal hold		Swing	−2.6	

2014 South Australian state election: Flinders
Party	Candidate	Votes	%	±%
Liberal	Peter Treloar	14,994	72.0	+14.0
Labor	Mathew Deane	3,214	15.4	−0.1
Family First	Grant Wilson	1,313	6.3	+1.5
Greens	Felicity Wright	1,299	6.2	−0.7
Total formal votes		20,820	97.6	+0.4
Informal votes		505	2.4	−0.4
Turnout		21,325	91.1	−0.1
Two-party-preferred result
Liberal	Peter Treloar	16,480	79.2	+3.0
Labor	Mathew Deane	4,340	20.8	−3.0
Liberal hold		Swing	+3.0	

2010 South Australian state election: Flinders
Party	Candidate	Votes	%	±%
Liberal	Peter Treloar	11,689	58.0	+4.0
Labor	Tauto Sansbury	3,129	15.5	+2.7
National	Wilbur Klein	2,969	14.7	−8.6
Greens	Felicity Wright	1,394	6.9	+2.9
Family First	Grant Wilson	979	4.9	+0.7
Total formal votes		20,160	97.1	
Informal votes		565	2.9	
Turnout		20,725	91.1	
Two-party-preferred result
Liberal	Peter Treloar	15,361	76.2	+15.2
Labor	Tauto Sansbury	4,799	23.8	+23.8
Liberal hold		Swing	N/A	

=== Elections in the 2000s ===
2006 South Australian state election: Flinders
Party	Candidate	Votes	%	±%
Liberal	Liz Penfold	10,052	53.2	−12.1
National	Hank Swalue	4,596	24.3	+15.1
Labor	John Lovegrove	2,380	12.6	−3.6
Family First	Errol Schuster	785	4.2	+4.2
Greens	Felicity Wright	773	4.1	+4.1
Democrats	John Hunwick	316	1.7	−4.4
Total formal votes		18,902	97.6	−0.6
Informal votes		473	2.4	+0.6
Turnout		19,375	91.3	−1.6
Two-party-preferred result
Liberal	Liz Penfold	14,839	78.5	+1.1
Labor	John Lovegrove	4,063	21.5	−1.1
Two-candidate-preferred result
Liberal	Liz Penfold	11,358	60.1	−18.3
National	Hank Swalue	7,544	39.9	+39.9
Liberal hold		Swing	N/A	

2002 South Australian state election: Flinders
Party	Candidate	Votes	%	±%
Liberal	Liz Penfold	13,373	65.3	+11.7
Labor	John Lovegrove	3,318	16.2	+5.4
National	Grantley Siviour	1,881	9.2	−15.9
Democrats	Sally Tonkin	1,242	6.1	−0.1
One Nation	Charles Kirvan	662	3.2	+3.2
Total formal votes		20,476	98.2	
Informal votes		385	1.8	
Turnout		20,861	92.9	
Two-party-preferred result
Liberal	Liz Penfold	16,047	78.4	+18.4
Labor	John Lovegrove	4,429	21.6	+21.6
Liberal hold		Swing	N/A	

=== Elections in the 1990s ===
1997 South Australian state election: Flinders
Party	Candidate	Votes	%	±%
Liberal	Liz Penfold	10,473	53.6	−1.8
National	Peter Blacker	4,904	25.1	−0.9
Labor	Manuel Chrisan	2,114	10.8	−0.8
Democrats	Kime Pedler	1,219	6.2	+2.0
United Australia	John Kroezen	829	4.2	+4.2
Total formal votes		19,539	97.6	−0.6
Informal votes		471	2.4	+0.6
Turnout		20,010	91.8	
Two-party-preferred result
Liberal	Liz Penfold	15,331	78.5	−1.9
Labor	Manuel Chrisan	4,208	21.5	+1.9
Two-candidate-preferred result
Liberal	Liz Penfold	11,715	60.0	+0.6
National	Peter Blacker	7,824	40.0	−0.6
Liberal hold		Swing	+0.6	

1993 South Australian state election: Flinders
Party	Candidate	Votes	%	±%
Liberal	Liz Penfold	10,353	54.0	+14.5
National	Peter Blacker	5,489	28.6	−13.0
Labor	Justin Jarvis	2,091	10.9	−3.1
Democrats	Elden Lawrie	931	4.9	+1.9
Call to Australia	Deidre Kent	308	1.6	+1.6
Two-party-preferred result
Liberal	Liz Penfold	15,456	80.6	−4.9
Labor	Justin Jarvis	3,716	19.4	+4.9
Two-candidate-preferred result
Liberal	Liz Penfold	11,086	57.8	+14.6
National	Peter Blacker	8,086	42.2	−14.6
Liberal gain from National		Swing	+14.6	

=== Elections in the 1980s ===
1989 South Australian state election: Flinders
Party	Candidate	Votes	%	±%
National	Peter Blacker	8,241	48.3	+8.9
Liberal	Kieran Kelly	6,148	36.1	−2.6
Labor	Terrence Krieg	2,156	12.6	−7.2
Democrats	Trevor Blood	510	3.0	+0.8
Total formal votes		17,055	98.4	+0.3
Informal votes		283	1.6	−0.3
Turnout		17,338	94.7	+0.7
Two-party-preferred result
National	Peter Blacker	13,337	78.2	+4.0
Labor	Terrence Krieg	3,718	21.8	−4.0
Two-candidate-preferred result
National	Peter Blacker	10,392	60.9	+2.6
Liberal	Kieran Kelly	6,663	39.1	−2.6
National hold		Swing	+2.6	

1985 South Australian state election: Flinders
Party	Candidate	Votes	%	±%
National	Peter Blacker	6,864	39.4	−12.6
Liberal	Arthur Whyte	6,740	38.7	+14.7
Labor	Terrence Krieg	3,446	19.8	−3.2
Democrats	George Jukes	380	2.2	−0.2
Total formal votes		17,430	98.1	
Informal votes		331	1.9	
Turnout		17,761	94.0	
Two-party-preferred result
Liberal	Arthur Whyte	12,933	74.2	−0.8
Labor	Terrence Krieg	4,497	25.8	+0.8
Two-candidate-preferred result
National	Peter Blacker	10,161	58.3	
Liberal	Arthur Whyte	7,269	41.7	
National hold		Swing	N/A	

1982 South Australian state election: Flinders
Party	Candidate	Votes	%	±%
National	Peter Blacker	8,106	53.6	−0.3
Liberal	Rex Mader	3,679	24.3	−2.7
Labor	Terrence Krieg	2,968	19.6	+0.5
Democrats	Helen Breakey	363	2.4	+2.4
Total formal votes		15,116	96.7	−0.6
Informal votes		509	3.3	+0.6
Turnout		15,625	94.2	+0.4
Two-party-preferred result
National	Peter Blacker	11,137	73.7	−0.4
Labor	Terrence Krieg	3,979	26.3	+0.4
National hold		Swing	N/A	

=== Elections in the 1970s ===
1979 South Australian state election: Flinders
Party	Candidate	Votes	%	±%
National	Peter Blacker	7,833	53.9	+2.4
Liberal	Brian Fitzgerald	3,931	27.0	+3.5
Labor	Terrence Krieg	2,784	19.1	−5.9
Total formal votes		14,548	97.3	−1.4
Informal votes		403	2.7	+1.4
Turnout		14,951	93.8	−1.4
Two-candidate-preferred result
National	Peter Blacker	10,199	70.1	−1.4
Liberal	Brian Fitzgerald	4,349	29.9	+29.9
National hold		Swing	N/A	

1977 South Australian state election: Flinders
Party	Candidate	Votes	%	±%
National	Peter Blacker	7,618	51.5	+11.2
Labor	Terrence Krieg	3,700	25.0	+0.3
Liberal	Victor Gerschwitz	3,477	23.5	−8.4
Total formal votes		14,795	98.7	
Informal votes		188	1.3	
Turnout		14,983	95.2	
Two-party-preferred result
National	Peter Blacker	10,986	74.2	+2.9
Labor	Terrence Krieg	3,809	25.8	+25.8
National hold		Swing	N/A	

1975 South Australian state election: Flinders
Party	Candidate	Votes	%	±%
National	Peter Blacker	5,561	51.1	−3.8
Labor	Maxwell Glenn	2,475	22.7	+22.7
Liberal	Ilimar Tohver	2,398	22.0	−23.1
Liberal Movement	William Turner	448	4.1	+4.1
Total formal votes		10,882	97.3	+3.9
Informal votes		303	2.7	−3.9
Turnout		11,185	94.5	−0.5
Two-party-preferred result
National	Peter Blacker	7,802	71.7	+16.8
Labor	Maxwell Glenn	3,080	28.3	+28.3
National hold		Swing	N/A	

1973 South Australian state election: Flinders
Party	Candidate	Votes	%	±%
National	Peter Blacker	5,221	54.9	+54.9
Liberal and Country	John Carnie	4,297	45.1	−14.8
Total formal votes		9,518	93.4	−5.0
Informal votes		672	6.6	+5.0
Turnout		10,190	95.0	−1.0
National gain from Liberal and Country		Swing	+54.9	

1970 South Australian state election: Flinders
Party	Candidate	Votes	%	±%
Liberal and Country	John Carnie	5,726	59.9	
Labor	Neville Cowan	3,248	34.0	
Democratic Labor	Douglas Barnes	586	6.1	
Total formal votes		9,560	98.4	
Informal votes		154	1.6	
Turnout		9,714	96.0	
Two-party-preferred result
Liberal and Country	John Carnie	6,224	65.1	
Labor	Neville Cowan	3,336	34.9	
Liberal and Country hold		Swing		

=== Elections in the 1960s ===
1968 South Australian state election: Flinders
Party	Candidate	Votes	%	±%
Liberal and Country	Glen Pearson	4,285	59.1	+5.5
Labor	Hugh Patterson	2,512	34.7	−4.3
Democratic Labor	Douglas Barnes	451	6.2	−1.2
Total formal votes		7,248	98.1	−0.5
Informal votes		137	1.9	+0.5
Turnout		7,385	95.7	−0.6
Two-party-preferred result
Liberal and Country	Glen Pearson	4,578	63.2	+3.3
Labor	Hugh Patterson	2,670	36.8	−3.3
Liberal and Country hold		Swing	+3.3	

1965 South Australian state election: Flinders
Party	Candidate	Votes	%	±%
Liberal and Country	Glen Pearson	3,678	53.6	+0.1
Labor	James Hudson	2,680	39.0	−7.5
Democratic Labor	Douglas Barnes	508	7.4	+7.4
Total formal votes		6,866	98.6	+0.4
Informal votes		97	1.4	−0.4
Turnout		6,963	96.3	+0.8
Two-party-preferred result
Liberal and Country	Glen Pearson	4,110	59.9	+6.4
Labor	James Hudson	2,756	40.1	−6.4
Liberal and Country hold		Swing	+6.4	

1962 South Australian state election: Flinders
Party	Candidate	Votes	%	±%
Liberal and Country	Glen Pearson	3,471	53.5	−6.6
Labor	James Hudson	3,013	46.5	+6.6
Total formal votes		6,484	98.2	−0.6
Informal votes		121	1.8	+0.6
Turnout		6,605	95.5	+0.4
Liberal and Country hold		Swing	−6.6	

=== Elections in the 1950s ===
1959 South Australian state election: Flinders
Party	Candidate	Votes	%	±%
Liberal and Country	Glen Pearson	3,806	60.1	n/a
Labor	P.J. Baillie	2,527	39.9	n/a
Total formal votes		6,333	98.8	n/a
Informal votes		74	1.2	n/a
Turnout		6,407	95.1	n/a
Liberal and Country hold		Swing	n/a	

1956 South Australian state election: Flinders
Party	Candidate	Votes	%	±%
Liberal and Country	Glen Pearson	unopposed		
Liberal and Country hold		Swing		

1953 South Australian state election: Flinders
Party	Candidate	Votes	%	±%
Liberal and Country	Glen Pearson	4,129	58.4	n/a
Labor	P.J. Baillie	2,936	41.6	n/a
Total formal votes		7,065	98.7	n/a
Informal votes		94	1.3	n/a
Turnout		7,159	96.3	n/a
Liberal and Country hold		Swing	+26.5	

1950 South Australian state election: Flinders
Party	Candidate	Votes	%	±%
Liberal and Country	Rex Pearson	unopposed		
Liberal and Country hold		Swing		

=== Elections in the 1940s ===
1947 South Australian state election: Flinders
Party	Candidate	Votes	%	±%
Liberal and Country	Rex Pearson	4,205	68.6	+26.5
Labor	W.A. Gosling	1,925	31.4	+4.7
Total formal votes		6,130	98.2	+0.9
Informal votes		112	1.8	−0.7
Turnout		6,242	93.9	+4.9
Liberal and Country hold		Swing	+9.6	

1944 South Australian state election: Flinders
Party	Candidate	Votes	%	±%
Liberal and Country	Rex Pearson	2,185	42.1	+8.0
Labor	J. V. O'Leary	1,383	26.7	−1.3
Single Tax League	Edward Craigie	1,208	23.3	−14.7
Unendorsed Liberal	Janette Octoman	410	7.9	+7.9
Total formal votes		5,168	97.3	−1.4
Informal votes		132	2.5	+1.6
Turnout		5,318	89.0	−1.4
Two-candidate-preferred result
Liberal and Country	Rex Pearson	3,059	59.0	+5.6
Labor	J. V. O'Leary	2,127	41.0	+41.0
Liberal and Country hold		Swing	+5.6	

1941 South Australian state election: Flinders
Party	Candidate	Votes	%	±%
Single Tax League	Edward Craigie	1,301	38.0	+3.1
Liberal and Country	Rex Pearson	1,169	34.1	+3.5
Labor	R. F. Poole	958	28.0	+1.1
Total formal votes		3,428	99.1	+1.5
Informal votes		30	0.9	−1.5
Turnout		3,458	55.2	−14.7
Two-candidate-preferred result
Liberal and Country	Rex Pearson	1,831	53.4	+14.0
Single Tax League	Edward Craigie	1,597	46.6	−14.0
Liberal and Country gain from Single Tax League		Swing	+14.0	

1938 South Australian state election: Flinders
Party	Candidate	Votes	%	±%
Single Tax League	Edward Craigie	1,451	34.9	
Liberal and Country	Rex Pearson	1,272	30.6	
Labor	J. V. O'Leary	1,117	26.9	
	P. V. Provis	315	7.6	
Total formal votes		4,155	97.6	
Informal votes		103	2.4	
Turnout		4,258	69.9	
Two-candidate-preferred result
Single Tax League	Edward Craigie	2,516	60.6	
Liberal and Country	Rex Pearson	1,639	39.4	
Single Tax League hold		Swing	N/A	
