= Martin Cameron (South Australian politician) =

Australian politician (1935–2025)

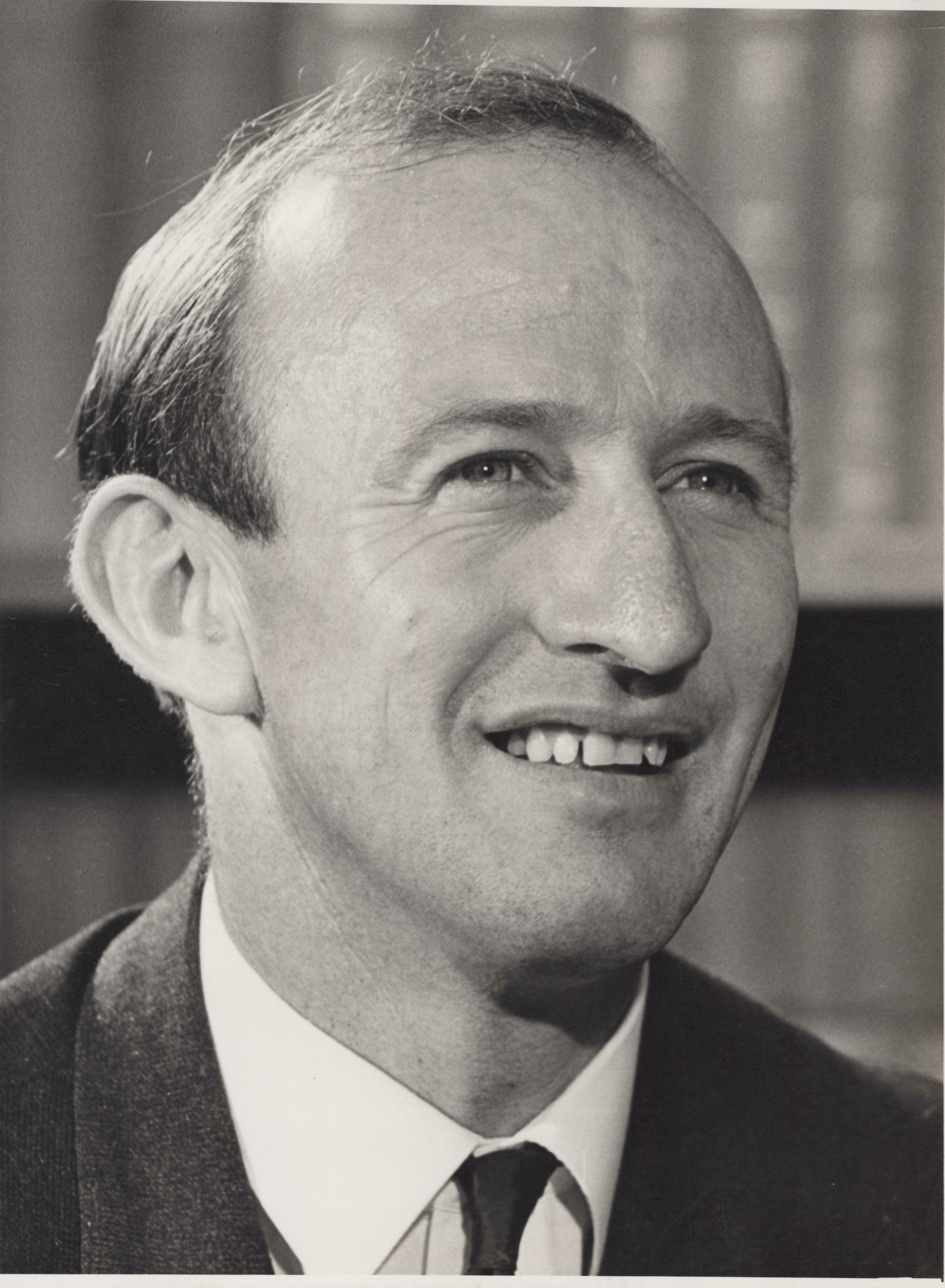
- Senator Cameron in 1969

Member of the South Australian Legislative Council
- In office 3 July 1971 – 31 August 1990
- Preceded by: Norman Jude
- Succeeded by: Bernice Pfitzner

Senator for South Australia
- In office 23 May 1969 – 24 October 1969
- Preceded by: Keith Laught
- Succeeded by: Don Cameron

Personal details
- Born: 24 August 1935 Millicent, South Australia, Australia
- Died: 24 June 2025 (aged 89) Adelaide, South Australia, Australia
- Party: Liberal (Federal, 1969); LCL (1971–1973); Liberal Movement (1973–1976); Liberal (1976–1990)
- Spouse: Barbara Mary Cameron (nee Hensley)
- Children: 5

Martin Bruce Cameron (24 August 1935 – 24 June 2025) was an Australian politician. He was a Liberal Party of Australia member of the Australian Senate from May to October 1969. He was later a member of the South Australian Legislative Council from 1971 to 1990, sitting as a Liberal except during 1973–1976, when he represented the splinter Liberal Movement.

Cameron died on 24 June 2025, at the age of 89.

== State defeat and Senate term ==
In 1968, Cameron contested the safe Labor House of Assembly seat of Millicent for the Liberal and Country League (LCL) after objecting to the views of incumbent Des Corcoran on road transport control. Cameron gained a 13% swing but lost by one vote. Cameron challenged the result at the Court of Disputed Returns, which ordered a by-election. Corcoran comfortably won the by-election.

Early in 1969, Senator Keith Laught died suddenly and Cameron was nominated by Premier Steele Hall as his replacement. However, Cameron's time in the Senate was brief, for an election for the vacancy was held to coincide with the 1969 Australian federal election in October and he was defeated by Labor's Don Cameron (no relation).

== State politics ==
Cameron entered South Australia's Legislative Council in 1971, following the retirement of Sir Norman Jude. He became an important ally of Steele Hall (then Leader of the Opposition), representing the increasingly visible moderate forces within the party. Cameron often opposed his fellow LCL Legislative Councillors, due to his support for Universal Suffrage for that chamber.

This tension within the LCL led to the formation of the Liberal Movement the following year. Led by Hall and Robin Millhouse, the movement originally functioned as a faction within the LCL. Cameron was one of its most prominent supporters. After the 1973 Election, the LCL (led at this stage by Bruce Eastick) expelled the Liberal Movement. Although some Liberal Movement members, such as future Premiers David Tonkin and Dean Brown, decided to remain in the LCL, Cameron left with Hall and Millhouse. Cameron was the only Liberal Movement member of the Legislative Council until the 1975 Election when he was joined by John Carnie.

However, the Liberal Movement was vastly outpolled by the LCL (renamed the Liberal Party in 1974), and there was a push from within both parties for reunification. In 1976, Cameron and Hall rejoined the Liberal Party, while Millhouse initially formed the New LM before helping found the Australian Democrats.

Despite not serving in the Tonkin ministry, Cameron assumed the position of Leader of the Opposition in the Legislative Council after the election of the John Bannon Labor government at the 1982 Elections. He held this position until his retirement from politics in 1990.

Following his retirement from the council, Cameron served a term as president of the South Australian branch of the Liberal Party. Later, he became a vocal supporter of the 'yes' case in the 1999 republic referendum.

== Sources ==
- Cameron M.B., 'Upper Houses I Have Known' in Hall S.R. (et al.), A Liberal Awakening: The LM Story, Investigator Press, Leabrook, 1973. pp. 71–81
- Jaensch D. & Bullock J., Liberals in Limbo: Non-Labor Politics in South Australia 1970-1978, Drummond, Melbourne, 1978.
