= 1975 South Australian state election =

- 12 July 1975

All 47 seats in the South Australian House of Assembly 24 seats were needed for a majority 11 (of the 21) seats of the South Australian Legislative Council
- Registered: 771,414
- Turnout: 721,770 (93.56%) (▼0.64 pp)
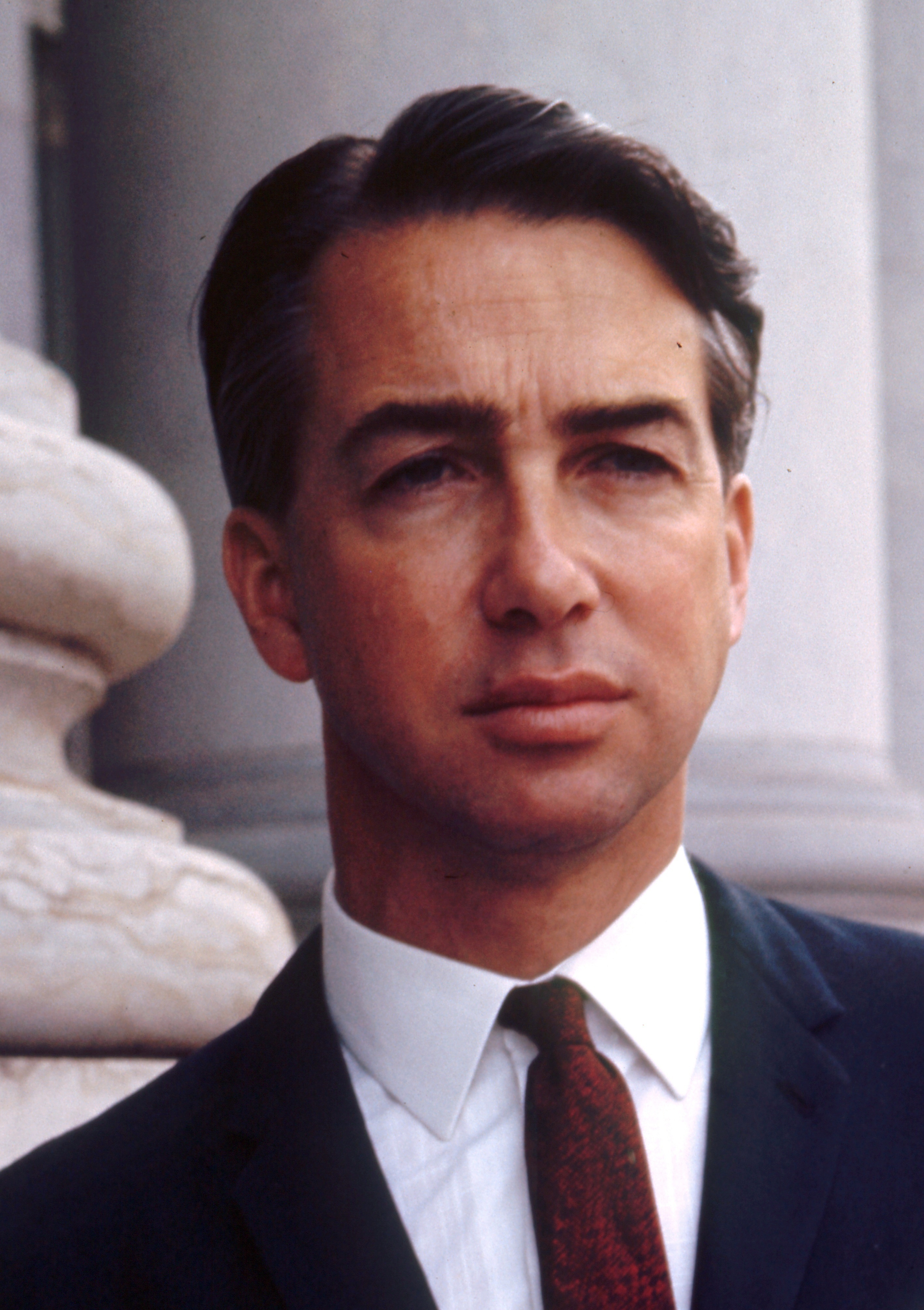

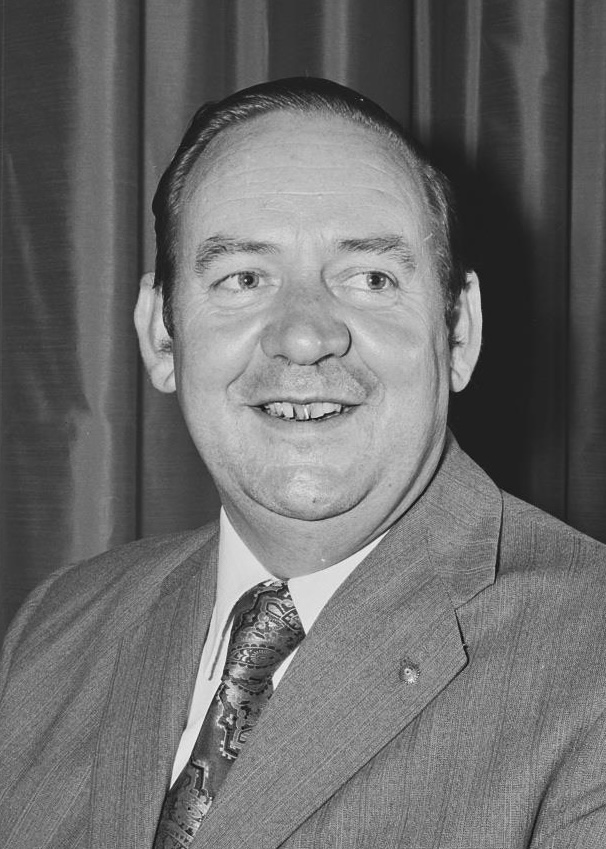
	First party	Second party	Third party
			LM
Leader	Don Dunstan	Bruce Eastick	Robin Millhouse
Party	Labor	Liberal	Liberal Movement
Leader since	1 June 1967	15 March 1972	2 April 1973
Leader's seat	Norwood	Light	Mitcham
Last election	26 seats	20 seats	Did not exist
Seats won	23 seats	20 seats	2 seats
Seat change	▼3	0	▲2
Primary vote	321,481	218,820	126,820
Percentage	46.32%	31.53%	18.27%
Swing	▼5.20	▼8.26	New party
TPP	49.20%	50.80%
TPP swing	▼5.30	▲5.30
Premier before election
Don Dunstan
Labor
Resulting Premier
Don Dunstan
Labor

State elections were held in South Australia on 12 July 1975. All 47 seats in the South Australian House of Assembly were up for election. The incumbent Australian Labor Party led by Premier of South Australia Don Dunstan won a third term in government, defeating the Liberal Party of Australia led by Leader of the Opposition Bruce Eastick.

It was the first time that a Labor government in South Australia had been re-elected for a third term, and would be the first seven-year-incumbent Labor government.

The election was also the first in South Australia where both major parties contested all lower house seats.

The election saw a drop in major party primary votes. This was due to the emergence of the socially progressive Liberal Movement (LM) led by Robin Millhouse, which achieved 18.3 percent of the primary vote and 2 seats.

The election of half of the South Australian Legislative Council was conducted using list proportional representation. Labor won 6 seats, the Liberal Party won 3, and the Liberal Movement won 2.

== Background ==
=== Emergence of Liberal Movement ===
The Liberal Movement broke away from the Liberal and Country League (LCL), which disbanded in 1973. The LCL was the predecessor to the South Australian Division of the Liberal Party of Australia. Stemming from discontent within the ranks of the LCL, the Liberal Movement was formed by former premier Steele Hall as an internal group in 1972 in response to a lack of social and acceptance of electoral reform within the LCL. A year later, when tensions heightened between the LCL's conservative wing and the LM, the LM was established as a party on its own as a progressive liberal party. When still part of the league, it had eleven representatives; on its own, it initially had three.

The 1975 election was fought with the Liberal Party, the Liberal Movement, and the Country Party all competing for votes against Labor, in the background of the Labor Prime Minister Gough Whitlam scandals, with this election taking place six months before the governor general dismissed the Whitlam government resulting in his defeat at the December 1975 federal election.

=== Upper house reforms ===
Historically, the Legislative Council (the upper house) had been dominated by an LCL majority for decades due to the Playmander electoral malapportionment as well as the limit on upper house voting rights to the wealthier classes with suffrage dependent on certain property and wage requirements. However they were highly independent and often obstructive to both major parties.

Originally the Legislative Council had fixed staggered terms and elections were held separately from lower house elections, which would later be changed by the introduction of joint elections in the 1980s.

The 1975 election saw the introduction of universal suffrage for the Legislative Council and the introduction of a statewide single electorate which filled the seats using a new electoral system - a form of list proportional representation (modified largest remainder system based on the Droop quota). The number elected at each election was increased from 10 to 11, meaning the house increased from 20 to 21 members, and would become a 22-member house from 1979 onwards.

== Results ==
The Liberals received a 50.8 percent two-party vote to Labor on 49.2 percent. The Liberals, Liberal Movement, and Country Party held a combined 23 seats, as did Labor. The balance of power was held by independent MP Ted Connelly, the mayor of Port Pirie. Connelly sided with Dunstan and accepted his offer of Speaker of the South Australian House of Assembly.

The LM won two seats (both sitting members: Robin Millhouse and David Boundy). When the LM joined the Liberal Party in 1976, Boundy joined the Liberals while Millhouse created the New LM; after which the numbers were Labor 23, Liberal 21, Country Party 1, New LM 1, and 1 independent supporting Labor (Connelly).

The 1975 election saw permanent large two-party swings away from Labor in a few rural seats − 13.5 percent in Chaffey, 15.5 percent in Mount Gambier and 16.4 percent in Millicent.

In the election of half of the Legislative Council, Labor won 6 seats, the Liberal Party won 3, and the Liberal Movement won 2; giving total numbers of Labor 10, Liberal 9, and Liberal Movement 2; giving the Liberal Movement the balance of power. The Liberal Movement members rejoined the Liberal Party in 1976, giving the Liberals a majority in the upper house.

== Aftermath ==
Following the close result of the election where Labor formed minority government, initial one vote one value electoral reform was enacted by Dunstan which would later be amended by future Labor premier John Bannon, after winning the 1989 election on 48.1 percent of the two-party vote. However, these winning minorities were closer than those of the Playmander period and did not occur as a result of malapportionment or weighting. Indeed, some metropolitan seats saw more than three times the number of voters than in some rural seats, something that would be rectified by the one vote one value electoral reform. It became the first and only state from 1989 to legislate the Electoral Commission of South Australia should redraw boundaries after each election with the objective that the party which receives over 50 percent of the statewide two-party vote at the forthcoming election should win the two-party vote in a majority of seats. One element of the Playmander still exists to this day − the change from multi-member to single-member seats.

== Key dates ==
- Issue of writ: 24 June 1975
- Close of nominations: 2 July 1975
- Polling day: 12 July 1975
- Return of writ: On or before 12 August 1975

== Results ==
=== House of Assembly ===
Arrangement of the House of Assembly after the 1975 state election.

South Australian state election, 12 July 1975 House of Assembly << 1973–1977 >>
Enrolled voters	771,414				
Votes cast	721,770		Turnout	93.56%	−0.64%
Informal votes	27,785		Informal	3.85%	−0.23%
Summary of votes by party
Party	Primary votes	%	Swing	Seats	Change
Labor	321,481	46.32%	−5.20%	23	−3
Liberal	218,820	31.53%	−8.26%	20	±0
Liberal Movement	126,820	18.27%	*	2	+2
National Country	19,208	2.77%	−1.18%	1	±0
Independent	6,281	0.91%	−3.41%	1	+1
Other	1,375	0.20%	*	0	±0
Total	693,985			47	
Two-party-preferred
Labor		49.20%	−5.30%		
Liberal		50.80%	+5.30%		

=== Legislative Council ===
Arrangement of the Legislative Council after the 1975 state election.

South Australian state election, 12 July, 1975 Legislative Council << 1973–1979 >>
Enrolled voters	771,414				
Votes cast	719,753		Turnout	93.3	–0.6
Informal votes	32,690		Informal	4.5	–4.8
Summary of votes by party
Party	Primary votes	%	Swing	Seats won	Seats held
Labor	324,744	47.3	–5.3	6	10
Liberal	191,341	27.8	–18.4	3	9
Liberal Movement	129,110	18.8	+18.8	2	2
National Country	14,640	2.1	+2.1	0	0
Family Movement	9,966	1.5	+1.5	0	0
Free Enterprise Group	8,141	1.2	+1.2	0	0
Socialist	4,273	0.6	+0.6	0	0
Australia	3,822	0.6	–0.2	0	0
Other	1,026	0.1	*	0	0
Total	687,063			11	21

== Post-election pendulum ==
Government seats (24)
Marginal
Gilles	Jack Slater	ALP	2.8%
Brighton	Hugh Hudson	ALP	3.8%
Henley Beach	Glen Broomhill	ALP	4.0%
Coles	Des Corcoran	ALP	4.2%
Unley	Gil Langley	ALP	5.0%
Mawson	Don Hopgood	ALP	5.6% v LM
Fairly safe
Mitchell	Ron Payne	ALP	6.3%
Peake	Don Simmons	ALP	6.3%
Norwood	Don Dunstan	ALP	6.9%
Tea Tree Gully	Molly Byrne	ALP	7.3%
Ascot Park	Geoff Virgo	ALP	9.9%
Safe
Adelaide	Jack Wright	ALP	12.2%
Playford	Terry McRae	ALP	12.3% v LM
Price	George Whitten	ALP	12.3%
Florey	Charles Wells	ALP	13.3%
Albert Park	Charles Harrison	ALP	13.4%
Pirie	Ted Connelly	IND	13.9% v ALP
Salisbury	Reg Groth	ALP	13.9%
Ross Smith	Jack Jennings	ALP	16.6%
Whyalla	Max Brown	ALP	18.3%
Elizabeth	Peter Duncan	ALP	19.6%
Stuart	Gavin Keneally	ALP	19.9%
Semaphore	Jack Olson	ALP	21.3%
Spence	Roy Abbott	ALP	22.3%

Opposition seats (23)
Marginal
Mount Gambier	Harold Allison	LIB	1.5%
Hanson	Heini Becker	LIB	5.7%
Fairly safe
Torrens	John Coumbe	LIB	6.1%
Glenelg	John Mathwin	LIB	7.9%
Millicent	Murray Vandepeer	LIB	9.9%
Safe
Rocky River	Howard Venning	LIB	10.9% v NAT
Murray	Ivon Wardle	LIB	12.0%
Light	Bruce Eastick	LIB	12.9%
Goyder	David Boundy	LM	13.6% v LIB
Frome	Ernest Allen	LIB	14.6%
Heysen	David Wotton	LIB	14.8% v LM
Fisher	Stan Evans	LIB	16.4%
Gouger	Keith Russack	LIB	16.4%
Chaffey	Peter Arnold	LIB	17.1%
Mitcham	Robin Millhouse	LM	17.8% v ALP
Bragg	David Tonkin	LIB	20.1%
Flinders	Peter Blacker	NCP	21.7% v ALP
Davenport	Dean Brown	LIB	22.3%
Alexandra	Ted Chapman	LIB	26.8%
Kavel	Roger Goldsworthy	LIB	28.7%
Eyre	Graham Gunn	LIB	29.3%
Victoria	Allan Rodda	LIB	29.4%
Mallee	Bill Nankivell	LIB	31.5%

== See also ==
- Results of the South Australian state election, 1975 (House of Assembly)
- Results of the 1975 South Australian state election (Legislative Council)
- Members of the South Australian House of Assembly, 1975-1977
- Members of the South Australian Legislative Council, 1975-1979
