= Liberal Movement =

Liberal Movement may refer to:

- Liberal Movement (Australia), a political party in South Australia
- Liberals' Movement (Lithuania), a political party in Lithuania
