= Keith Laught =

Australian politician

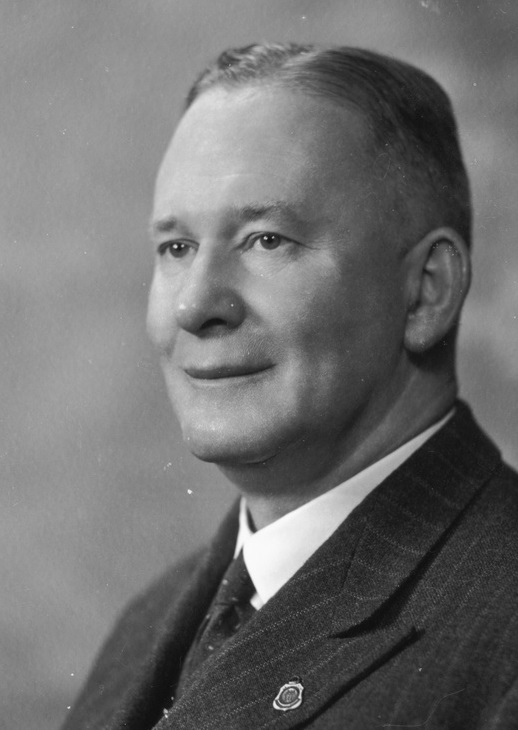

Senator for South Australia
- In office 28 April 1951 – 13 May 1969
- Succeeded by: Martin Cameron

Personal details
- Born: 2 June 1907 Mitcham, South Australia
- Died: 13 May 1969 (aged 61) Canberra
- Party: Liberal
- Spouse: Josephine (Jo) née Hackett
- Parent(s): Alexander and Johanne Laught
- Education: University of Adelaide
- Occupation: Barrister and solicitor

Keith Alexander Laught (2 June 1907 – 13 May 1969) was an Australian politician.

Laught was born in Mitcham, South Australia. His parents were telegraph clerk Alexander Veitch Laught and his wife Johanne Christiane née Wittber. He was educated at Unley High School and Scotch College then the University of Adelaide, becoming a barrister and solicitor in 1928 and moving to the Mid North town of Clare where he met and married his wife, Josephine Faith (Jo) née Hackett. Laught remained Presbyterian but was married in his bride's Anglican church in 1935. The couple moved to Mount Gambier in 1938.

Laught served with the 3rd Light Horse Regiment from 1939 and volunteered for the Second Australian Imperial Force in 1940, joining the 9th Division Cavalry Regiment. He served in the Middle East but suffered from medical issues that saw him returned to Australia in 1943 and discharged on 1 January 1944.

In the 1951 election, Laught was elected to the Australian Senate as a Liberal Senator for South Australia, receiving a short term following the double dissolution election. He faced election again at the 1953 election which was the first half-senate election held separately from the lower house. He lived in Mount Gambier until 1959, then moved to Glenunga in Adelaide to make travel to Canberra easier. Laught was an advocate for the decimalisation of Australian currency, and for the adoption of metric weights and measures. He held the seat until his death on the way from his hotel to Parliament House in 1969; Martin Cameron was appointed to fill the casual vacancy.
