= Dave McKee =

Australian politician

David Hugh McKee (born 1 May 1919 in Wondai, Queensland, Australia - died 4 May 2005 in Adelaide, South Australia) was an Australian politician who represented the South Australian House of Assembly seats of Port Pirie (1959–1970) and Pirie (1970–1975) for the Labor Party. He was Minister of Labour and Industry from 1970 to 1975 under Don Dunstan. McKee was one of the most progressive politicians of his time, making significant contributions towards "South Australia's pioneering legalisation of abortion and male homosexual acts in 1969 and 1972." Upon his death, Members of Parliament from both the Labor and Liberal parties recalled his strength of character and some of the legendary tales of McKee's time as the Member for Pirie. McKee was husband to Rhonda, father to Colin and Laneene, grandfather to Penelope and Matthew and great-grandfather to Tabitha, Mitchell and Marley. Dave and Rhonda played a hugely important role in raising their grandchildren after his resignation in 1975, the year his granddaughter was born.

Political offices
| Preceded by Glen Broomhill | Minister for Labour and Industry; 1970–1975 | Succeeded by Jack Wright |
Parliament of South Australia
| Preceded by Charles Davis | Member for Port Pirie; 1959–1970 | Seat abolished |
| New seat | Member for Pirie; 1970–1975 | Succeeded by Ted Connelly |
