= New Liberal Movement =

Former South Australian political party

- Leader: Robin Millhouse
- Founded: 6 May 1976
- Dissolved: 1977
- Preceded by: Liberal Movement
- Merged into: Australian Democrats
- Headquarters: South Australia
- Ideology: Liberalism
- Political position: Centre
- Legislative Assembly: 1 / 37 (1976–1977)

The New Liberal Movement (New LM) was a South Australian political party which existed from 1976 to 1977, with one member of parliament.

In 1976 the Liberal Movement dissolved and three of its four parliamentary members rejoined the Liberal Party. However the remaining member, Robin Millhouse, argued that the South Australian Division of the Liberal Party of Australia was no longer worthy of the descriptor liberal, and instead founded the New LM in May 1976.

Millhouse kept a high profile for the New LM until the party merged with the Australia Party to form the Australian Democrats in 1977, thus causing it to cease to exist. The New LM had had some reservations about merging with the Australia Party, but the resignation of prominent politician Don Chipp from the Liberal Party represented an opportunity to expand the reach of the two parties. Chipp had agreed to become leader of the Australia Party only if it merged with the New LM, thus motivating the two parties to do so. Jack Evans, a member of the New LM, went on to serve as a Senator for the Democrats, representing Western Australia.

In his book The Third Man, Australian Democrats leader Don Chipp recalls attending a March 1977 meeting convened by John Siddons and attended by

other Australia Party executives and Robin Millhouse, the South Australian MP whom I had admired for many years, and his executive colleagues from the New Liberal Movement were also present. The two parties had already held several meetings over the years to attempt an amalgamation, as their political philosophies were both essentially 'middle of the road'.
