= John Carnie =

Australian politician

John Alfred Carnie (30 March 1927 – 10 September 2009) was an Australian politician who represented the South Australian House of Assembly seat of Flinders from 1970 to 1973 and then in the upper house from 1975 to 1982. He represented the Liberal and Country League in the House of Assembly, but was heavily associated with Steele Hall's moderate Liberal Movement faction from 1972. He followed Hall in leaving the party when the Liberal Movement became a separate party in 1973, and was elected to the Legislative Council for the LM in 1975. He rejoined the party when the majority of the LM merged back into the Liberal Party in 1976, and continued under that banner until leaving parliament in 1982.

Parliament of South Australia
Preceded by Glen Pearson	Member for Flinders; 1970–1973	Succeeded by Peter Blacker
