= Ted Connelly =

Australian politician

Edward Connelly (6 November 1918 – 17 September 2013) was an Australian politician. He was an independent member of the South Australian House of Assembly between 1975 and 1977, representing the electorate of Pirie.

At the 1975 state election, Labor and the opposition parties held 23 seats each. Connelly was in a balance of power situation, and subsequently sided with Labor, and was made Speaker of the South Australian House of Assembly for the Don Dunstan Labor government.

He had previously served as mayor of the City of Port Pirie from 1971 to 1975. Connelly served in World War 2 in the RAAF, and in the last two years of the war as a flight sergeant in Darwin.

On 16 September 2013, Connelly died at the Mary Potter Hospice in Adelaide. He was 94.

Parliament of South Australia
Preceded by Dave McKee	Member for Pirie; 1975–1977	District abolished
Preceded by John Ryan	Speaker of the South Australian House of Assembly; 1975–1977	Succeeded by Gil Langley
