= Liberal Movement (Australia) =

South Australian political party (1973-1976)

- Historic leaders: Steele Hall
- Founded: 21 March 1972 (as faction of the LCL); 2 April 1973 (as political party)
- Dissolved: May 1976
- Split from: Liberal and Country League
- Merged into: Liberal Party of Australia
- Succeeded by: New Liberal Movement
- Ideology: Social liberalism (Australian); Progressivism
- Political position: Centre

The Liberal Movement (LM) was a South Australian political party which existed from 1973 to 1976, and was a forerunner to the Australian Democrats.

The LM was initially organised in 1972 by former premier Steele Hall, as a progressive liberal group in the Liberal and Country League (LCL), in response to a perceived resistance to reform within the LCL. When tensions heightened between the LCL's conservative wing and the LM after the March 1973 state election, some of the members split from the LCL, forming a new party on 2 April 1973.

While still part of the LCL, the LM had eleven state parliamentarians. On its own, it was reduced to three parliamentarians − Hall and Robin Millhouse in the lower house and Martin Cameron in the upper house. At the 1974 federal election Hall won a Senate seat and David Boundy retained his South Australia seat for the LM. At the 1975 state election, Millhouse and Boundy retained their seats, while John Carnie won a second seat and Cameron retained his seat in the upper house, bringing the party to a peak of five parliamentarians.

However, the LCL and LM parties narrowly failed to dislodge the incumbent Dunstan Labor government at the 1975 state election. That result, together with internal weaknesses, led in 1976 to the LM's being re-absorbed into the LCL, which by then had become the South Australian Division of the Liberal Party of Australia. The Liberal Party also lost the 1977 state election, but succeeded in winning government at the 1979 state election.

A segment of the LM, led by former state attorney-general Robin Millhouse, did not rejoin the Liberals, but instead formed a new party—the New LM. This party, combined with the Australia Party—under the invited leadership of Don Chipp—formed the nucleus of the Australian Democrats which aspired to a balance of power in the federal Senate and up to four state upper houses for three decades. The LM and its successor parties gave voice to what is termed "small-l liberalism" in Australia.

== Party system ==
Before parties became established in the Australian colonies in the later 19th century, all members of the colonial parliaments were independents, occasionally labelled as "liberal" or "conservative", amongst other terms. With the advent of Labor, these groups combined to form anti-Labor parties. "Liberal", in the Australian context, refers to what could be described as classical liberalism, and is distant from the modern meaning that the word has acquired in the United States and some other countries. Liberalism in Australia represents the centre-right of the political spectrum, while Labor represents the centre-left.

The first Labor party in South Australia was the United Labor Party in 1891, born out of a trade union association that recommended and supported trade unionist candidates. In response, the National Defence League (NDL) was born two years later. In 1909, the NDL combined with the Liberal and Democratic Union and the Farmers and Producers Political Union to form the Liberal Union, later known as the Liberal Federation. The ULP transformed into the Labor Party in 1910, and has been known by this name ever since. A separate Country Party subsequently emerged, representing rural interests, but this was assimilated back into the conservative side of politics with the formation of the Liberal and Country League (LCL) in 1932. The South Australian party system has not deviated from this two-party divide, and all other parties gained negligible representation or influence, until the emergence of smaller parties such as the Australian Democrats in the late 20th century, and the Greens and Family First Party in the 21st century.

== Liberal representation ==
Political scientists Neal Blewett and Dean Jaensch characterised the LCL as a strange amalgamation of differing groups: "the Adelaide 'establishment', the yeoman proprietary (farmers and regional workers), and the Adelaide middle class". Of these groups, the middle class was the most electorally depressed, both in parliament and within the party itself, owing to a 2:1 ratio favouring regional areas both in electoral legislation and the party organisation. The establishment influenced the party with its financial backing, while the yeoman proprietary was the most numerous. Only in 1956 did the urban middle class achieve parliamentary representation through Robin Millhouse, who was elected to the urban middle class seat of Mitcham.

Millhouse was a vocal advocate of his broader constituency, championing their case in a party dominated by rural conservatives. He wrote a paper on the 'Liberal Case for Electoral Reform', arguing for a fairer electoral system, as it was biased against voters resident in the capital city, Adelaide, whether they be progressive or conservative, Liberal or Labor. Many younger urban middle class voters, who would have normally been attracted to the LCL, were abandoning the party for Labor owing to their dissatisfaction with the malapportioned electoral system known as the 'Playmander'. But this concerned the rural conservatives little, who hoped to retain their hold on power through the present system, which included a Legislative Council where suffrage was based on land ownership, resulting in a body dominated by the ruling class and the rural landholders, and a 16–4 LCL majority. Millhouse's paper was quickly ignored.

The LCL had governed, primarily under the stead of Sir Thomas Playford, for 32 years, and finally lost to Labor in 1965. A year and a half later, when Playford retired, Steele Hall was elected to replace him. A young farmer from a rural constituency, Hall had never conflicted with the party line, and was expected to uphold the existing LCL principles, having spoken out in support of the Playmander and the restrictive Legislative Council before. However, when the LCL was returned to office in 1968 under his leadership, with the help of malapportionment, Hall was under pressure. Labor had led the LCL 52.0 to 43.8% on primary votes, but owing to the Playmander, both ended with 19 seats and an independent supported the LCL and returned them to power. Large protests against the Playmander broke out, and there were strong calls for reform.

The LCL had routinely ignored such protests before, but Hall's course differed from what was expected. He appointed Millhouse his Attorney-General, and continued a raft of social reform that had begun under the previous Labor government. This was opposed by some conservatives within the party; lines began to be drawn, and factions began to appear. Hall commented in the party's newsletter that "too many people see the LCL as a party tied to conservative traditions. We must show voters that we can move with the times, that we are 'with it'."

== Electoral reform ==
The level of malapportionment had grown to a level in excess of 3:1 in favour of rural areas, and Hall, having won the 1968 state election on 46 per cent of the two-party-preferred vote, committed himself to a fairer electoral system. Previously 39 members were elected: 13 from metropolitan Adelaide and 26 from the country. Hall's first attempt for reform was a system with 45 seats and 20 from the country; this proposal received scorn from both Labor and the rural councillors, and was seen as not going far enough by the former and going too far by the latter. A second proposal, for 47 seats with 19 in the country, was adopted with bipartisan support in the House of Assembly, but encountered opposition in the Legislative Council. The new system would make an LCL win near-impossible at the coming 1970 state election, and Hall and the LCL were aware of it. For his weakening of rural constituencies, Hall became an enemy to those councillors who stood in defence of the previous system. Hall saw the political situation as untenable and felt the LCL needed reform to cope with the removal of an artificial situation.

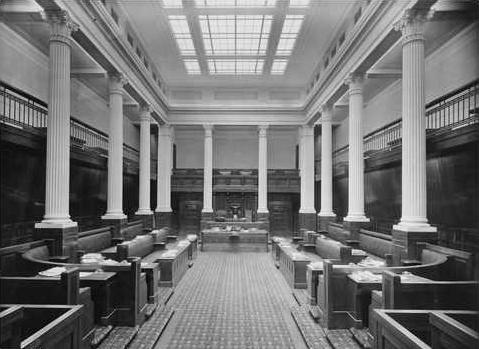
The rural conservatives, whose power was grounded in the Legislative Council (pictured), sought to retain their influence in both the party and the state through malapportionment in electoral districts and the LCL party organisation.

Labor's leader, Don Dunstan, also introduced a bill for reform of the Legislative Council, which sought to remove its wage and property based qualifications and instil adult suffrage. Hall himself stated he would approve the bill if it included a clause guaranteeing that the Legislative Council could only be abolished through a referendum. Dunstan agreed, but Hall's own party split on the issue. The bill passed the House of Assembly with Labor support, but failed in the Legislative Council where the LCL's rural conservatives dominated its restricted electoral base.

Behind the votes in parliament was a personal antagonism between Hall and Ren DeGaris, the leader of the LCL in the Legislative Council. DeGaris, who was elected to the council in 1962, was a staunch defender of its franchise and electoral boundaries. The two were the de facto leaders of the party's two factions; Hall represented the urban-based progressives, and DeGaris the rural-based conservatives. The conflict between the two extended beyond politics and on to a personal level, contributing to the polarisation of views within the LCL and making it difficult for an internal compromise to be reached on the issue of electoral reform.

After the LCL lost government in 1970, primarily owing to the electoral reform, Hall managed to be re-elected as leader. He convinced a majority of the party's membership that reform was needed, and sought to remove the influence that the party's representatives in the Legislative Council held. When the Dunstan government again introduced a bill to introduce universal suffrage to the council, Hall gained the support of 7 out of 20 members in the Assembly, but only 2 of 16 LCL members in the Legislative Council supported the bill. Internally, there was much opposition to any electoral reform when the matter was debated at party conferences.

The conservatives then moved against Hall, putting forward party proposals to lessen the influence of its parliamentary leader. Liberal parties in Australia had long held to a tradition of the separation of houses, independence of members, and the ability of the parliamentary leader to choose his own cabinet. The rural councillors sought to preserve their power, and demanded that cabinet positions not be decided by the leader, but elected by the parliamentary party as a whole. As this would include the Legislative Council, dominated by its rural membership, Hall's support among moderate Liberals would be overwhelmed by the councillors' inclusion. Hall privately told Legislative Council Chairman David Brookman that he could not work with DeGaris and that he would resign if he was not allowed to choose his cabinet.

After the parliamentary party agreed on this issue 12–8, Hall resigned the leadership on 16 March 1972, stating that "I cannot continue to lead a Party that will not follow; I cannot lead a Party which has lost its idealism and which has forgotten that its purpose for existence is to govern successfully for the welfare of all South Australians. Our Party is still deeply cleft by the persuasive influence of a number of its members in the Legislative Council." Later in the speech, he said "Over the last three years I have been subject to a great deal of disloyalty on a continuing basis ... I had hoped this afternoon to move a motion of no confidence in the Government; instead, I found out Party had moved a vote of no confidence in itself." Premier Dunstan, with whom Hall had never had amiable relations, crossed the floor of the house and shook Hall's hand in a gesture of solidarity. Hall said he "was knifed" and said the conservatives' actions were "a clear example of how deeply the wooden horses of the Legislative Council have entrenched themselves in the ranks of the Assembly membership". The LCL President Ian McLachlan put on a brave face, saying "Mr Hall had some personal problems with the party, but these differences do not make a divided party" but he was quoted the next day as saying that the proposal was mooted to gauge Hall's power. The obscure and low-key conservative Bruce Eastick was installed as the new leader, as some more prominent figures such as Millhouse were seen as too sympathetic to Hall. In the meantime, there was a strong reaction to Hall's departure among the public, and segments of the LCL, notably the youth wings, demonstrated against the events and made motions of objection. Hall had expected to become a normal backbencher, but the groundswell of support prompted a change of heart.

== Formation ==
Hall initially sought to appeal to the State Council of the LCL. Although the body had no binding authority over the parliamentary caucus, which chose the leader, Hall and his followers saw it as an opportunity for a media victory. The motion went narrowly against Hall, but it generated much attention and potential embarrassment for the conservatives.

After this, he thought of establishing his own separate party, citing small opinion polls that supported this action, but Ian Wilson, the former member for the federal Division of Sturt, convinced him to stay within the LCL and bring about internal change. Strong support emerged from within the party for Hall's stand, particularly from its youth wing, the Young Liberals. On 21 March 1972, a faction, but closer to a "party within a party" was formed: the New Liberals. On 28 March it was renamed the Liberal Movement. The conservatives strongly criticised Hall and his new movement, accusing them of undermining Eastick, disrupting the party and being disloyal.

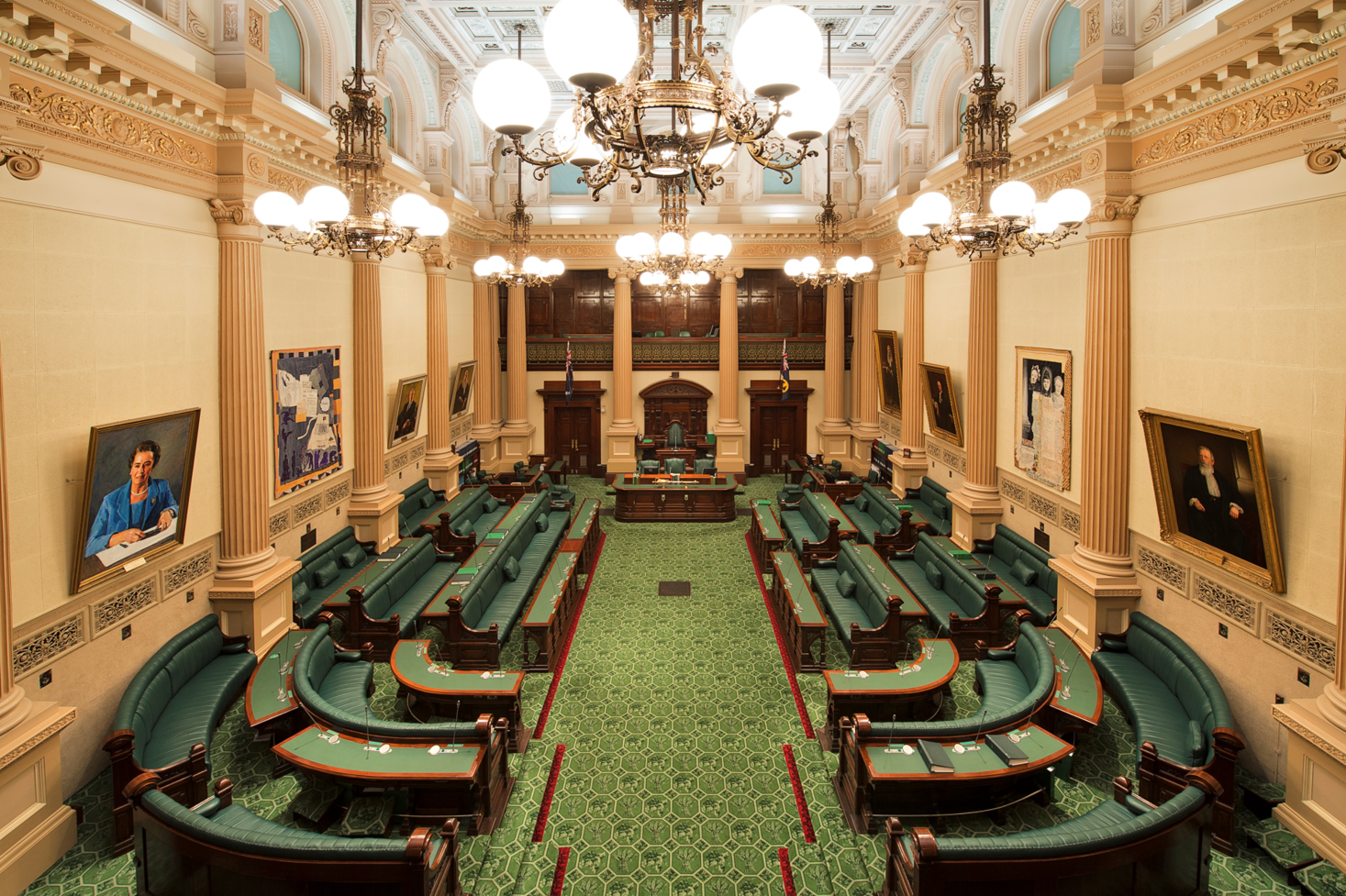
The House of Assembly (pictured) had seven LM members while still part of the LCL, reduced to two when it split from its parent.

It quickly gained support within the LCL's membership, capturing a number of party branches and began preselecting its own members. Robin Millhouse was a member of the faction, and served as the deputy leader of both the LCL and the LM. Thanks to the electoral reform that had occurred, with more urban electoral districts to contest, the urban-based LM greatly increased its parliamentary representation, with seven members in the House of Assembly (including Hall, Millhouse and future Premiers David Tonkin and Dean Brown), three in the Legislative Council, and one in the Australian House of Representatives (Ian Wilson). Soon there were factional clashes during parliamentary debate, and combative television debates. One LCL branch president publicly called Hall a "traitor". The LM managed to worry the conservatives by managing to seize control of some rural branches within electorates held by strongly anti-LM representatives, including that of DeGaris. The conservatives tried to remove Hall's endorsement for his seat, but failed. Several bitterly fought pre-selection battles followed. As a former premier, Hall was much more proficient than Eastick at dealing with the press, and used his skills to generate more media publicity, prompting Eastick to claim bias.

The LM sought to seize control of the LCL agenda by winning key positions on the state executive at the annual general meeting in September, but this was difficult as the malapportionment towards rural groups was entrenched at party level, and because the conservatives had anticipated the LM's plans. The LM President Alex Perryman challenged McLachlan for the party presidency and in a high-profile contest received 47% of the vote in a narrow defeat. He received around 90% among urban delegates and around 33% of the rural votes, the latter figure shocking the conservatives. The LM later generated more publicity by inquiring about alleged impropriety in the balloting process.

The LM's policies were generally progressive, and Hall himself stated that "we had no major differences with the written philosophies of the LCL". The LM's colour, purple, was described by observers as "LCL blue with a dash of Labor red", signifying the faction's location on the political spectrum. The LM was less concerned with creating differing policy as it was taking over and reforming the LCL; however, on the electoral reform front, the LM started by calling for the Legislative Council to be devoid of ministers. Worried by the LM, conservatives in the LCL tried to change the party rules to prevent members from criticising the organisation in public, and enforce discipline. This backfired as the LM exploited it to portray the conservatives as repressive, and the media also viewed it negatively, and the move was put on hold. The non-Labor forces, in their disunity, were in a poor position to challenge the dominance of charismatic Premier Dunstan. The LM itself contained two poorly defined internal groups: moderates, concerned with the inequalities of the electoral systems and the LCL's ageing image; and radicals, who espoused the aforementioned in addition to the desire for wide-ranging social reform. Some of the latter felt Hall was the most progressive option available, but not progressive enough. Nevertheless, the LM had generated a large amount of campaign funds and had great name recognition; Hall was also favoured in opinions as a better leader than Eastick by a threefold factor. They cited such figures to portray themselves as the main threat to Labor and justify why they were the direction the LCL needed to take. Late in the year the LM received another boost when Wilson regained the seat of Sturt for the Liberal Party at the 1972 federal election, making much of his LM membership.

In the 1973 state election, the LM largely ran a separate campaign from the LCL as a whole. The majority of the LCL's metropolitan candidates were also within the LM, and it was hoped that enough seats would be gained so that not only would the LCL return to power, but that the LM would be able to overpower the conservative faction in the House of Assembly and re-elect Hall as leader. To do this, they needed to capture at least three marginal Labor seats in Adelaide. This also meant the conservatives in the LCL would be better off losing to Labor if they wanted to maintain their hold on the party, as Labor's vulnerable seats were in all in the city, and a Labor loss meant a LM gain. The LCL campaign chairperson explicitly said that she would prefer losing if it meant keeping control of the party. While the LM ran an innovative campaign, the LCL itself faltered, losing support in the country to a separate Country Party and to Labor in metropolitan Adelaide. One LM seat held by a rural member was lost to the Country Party. The LM were branded by the LCL conservatives as being the reason behind the LCL's defeat. The LM saw itself as a more modern and appropriate alternative to the LCL, more in tune with urban mainstream, but there was no evidence that urban LM candidates were more popular than conservative LCL candidates in Adelaide. LM members made up the majority of urban LCL candidates, but were unable to wrest any Labor seats in Adelaide.

Labor's convincing win was not unexpected, particularly as infighting in the LCL had been ongoing for over a year. Friction was present throughout the campaign as well as before it, particularly as much of the donations were given directly to the LM. In the months before the election LCL members had thrown punches in the corridors of Parliament House. Internal battles between conservatives and LM members for party pre-selection were keenly contested. Around half of the LCL candidates were LM supporters and avoided mention of the LCL and its conservative leader Bruce Eastick in their pamphlets. Some of the LM faction candidates instead trumpeted Hall as their leader and printed books detailing their policies. There was also an incident where a LM function celebrating Wilson's win in the 1972 federal election clashed with Eastick's main policy speech. Eastick and his conservatives arrived at Wilson's dinner after they finished campaigning for the night, but then walked out when Wilson was delivering a speech calling for the LCL to be more tolerant of the diverse opinions within the party. Labor ran a sedate campaign, but made much of the internal LCL divisions.

== Split ==
Despite the LCL's defeat, the failure of the LM to gain internal supremacy over the conservatives was seen by the latter as a vindication of their policies. Pressure from the LCL's leader, Bruce Eastick, who called on the LM to disband, and the conservative wing of the party, saw machinations against the LM. Hall reiterated the LM's intention to continue, but Millhouse was removed as the LCL deputy leader in 1973, and pressure began to be mounted on the faction, which did not have any members on the frontbench; Hall did not pursue a position in the shadow ministry. Tension continued as rumours spread claiming that the LCL State Council was contemplating the forbidding and vetoing of LM members from representing the party in elections. While Hall and Martin Cameron responded by publicly vowing to stand firm, several of their LM colleagues were ambivalent when asked about the intentions if the LM were no longer tolerated within the LCL. However, Heini Becker left the LM.

On 23 March, a motion was passed at the state council that allowed it to deny membership to those who belonged to "outside political organisations", and the LM was subsequently declared to be one. Strangely, an LCL member could also be a member of the Communist Party of Australia, but not the LM. A motion by LM members to also declare the League of Rights an outside political organisation failed. The LCL conservatives were confident the LM would capitulate and reintegrate, as third parties had never been successful in South Australia. At first, LM members tried to have their banning from the LCL deemed illegal, but this failed.

It was not expected that the LM would split to form a separate party. But before it was established, Hall promptly resigned from the LCL, declaring it "hypocritical and decadent". Martin Cameron quickly followed, and Robin Millhouse consulted with members from his constituency before agreeing to resign from the LCL. Ian Wilson, who had earlier managed to convince Hall not to form a separate party, tried in vain to sway him to remain with the LCL and focus on reforming it from within. He wanted to shut down the LM in an attempt to limit the damage to the party, believing that "political groups come and go, but the ideals we aim for will never change". All other LCL-LM members did not follow; three lower house members including Tonkin and Brown, Wilson in the federal parliament, and two MLCs all stayed in the LCL. David Tonkin stated that "every one of those Liberals who resign from the League is making it more and more certain that the League will remain just as it is".

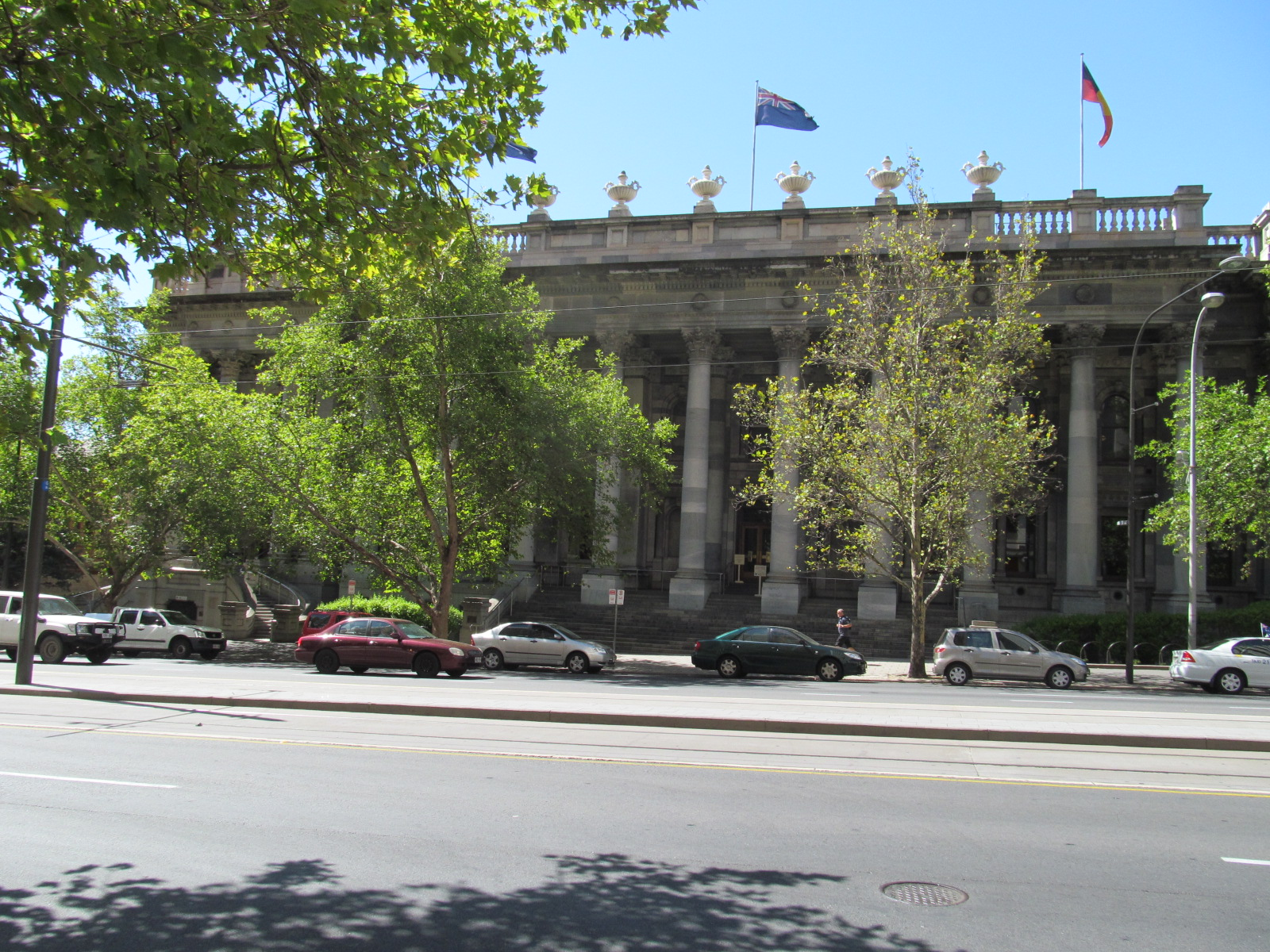
Parliament House in Adelaide

A number of LCL branches remained with the LM, and there were mass resignations from the LCL on the whole. Eastick was relatively unconcerned: the LCL had a massive membership of over 30,000 and the LM's split did little to dent it—Eastick admitted 200 individual resignations. In the meantime, the LCL tried to introduce a requirement for members to make "pledge" that they were not aligned with "an outside political body". This prompted a second wave of resignations, notably from sections of the Young Liberal Movement. Despite its leader's show of confidence, many in the LCL were concerned that the expulsion of LM elements had apparently backfired; it also prompted some disillusioned parliamentarians to suggest that rural and urban elements in the LCL could not coexist.

The new party was formally announced on 2 April after an LM convention. As the LM had already begun establishing an infrastructure while in the LCL, it was able to pick up momentum readily, presenting itself as a centrist moderate party, but it was never able to shed its reliance on Hall.

As Hall and Millhouse were both competent parliamentary performers, it was widely acknowledged in the media that they outperformed the LCL in providing an effective opposition. In one parliamentary division, with the entirety of the ALP and LCL on one side of the house and the LM members on the other, Millhouse took one of many opportunities to taunt Eastick and damage the LCL, labelling him "Dunstan lover!" The South Australian media, which had earlier warmed to Premier Dunstan, then focused their attention on the LM and gave the fledgling party much-needed publicity.

The primary instigator for the creation of the LM in 1972 had been based around the lack of electoral reform. The electoral system had been expected to continue to return rural LCL members in the Legislative Council, yet at the 1973 state election Labor had, through the mass registration of new voters for the council vote, managed to gain two seats, giving a council of 14 LCL, 6 Labor. As half the council was elected at each election, Labor only had to retain their vote to gain an additional two seats at the 1975 state election, and a minor rise in it would see additional council seats fall to them. It was increasingly plausible that Labor would be able to gain a majority in the Legislative Council within a decade and then carry through their goal of abolishing it, and push through any electoral legislation it so wished.

To the LCL, this was a dangerous situation, and seeing a need to avoid it, they compromised: their position abruptly changed to being in favour of wholesale reform of the Legislative Council. When Dunstan put forward bills to reform it, the LCL relented, and Eastick convinced the LCL councillors to let them pass, conditional on amendments to the legislation. These were a minor change to the particular proportional system used to elect the councillors, and that it remained non compulsory to vote in the council. The new council would eventually have 22 members, with half elected each election from a multi-member constituency covering the entirety of the state. Hall attacked the LCL for its sudden change in stance on reform, and managed to see the first LM policy become law with the lowering of the council suffrage age to 18.

The reform legislation for the Legislative Council was not to take effect until the next election, and the death of LCL MLC Henry Kemp necessitated a by-election for the council district of Southern on 11 August 1973. Southern was an ultra-safe rural LCL seat, and Labor declined to stand in the by-election. It was contested by the LCL, the LM, a separate Country Party and the Australia Party. The three non-LCL parties agreed on favourable preference deals in the hope of one of them displacing the LCL. The LM gained 29 per cent of the vote, and the LCL candidate, John Burdett, won by a 4 per cent margin once preferences had been distributed.

At the start of 1974, the LCL had undertaken some progressive reforms. They brought in a less conservative membership at the grassroots level, although the old guard was still prominent in parliamentary roles. They tried to broach the possibility of reintegrating the LM. Wilson and the new executive director of the LCL, John Vial were at the forefront, but the LM was optimistic about its future and refused unless the LCL changed leaders and allowed for explicitly separate urban and rural factions, which did not happen.

== Elections and support ==
Liberal Movement (and new LM in 1977) electoral results in SA
Election	%LCL/LIB/CP	%LM	LM LH seats	LM UH seats
1974 (federal)	40.71%	8.2%	0	1
1975 (state)	34.3%	18.27%	2	2
1975 (federal)	49.29%	6.20%	0	1
1977 (state)	44.25%	3.48%	1	n/a
Source: Australian Government and Politics Database

=== Federal election 1974 ===
In order to give the LM national exposure, Hall decided to stand for the Australian Senate at the 1974 federal election. Another objective was to allow Millhouse and Cameron to become more prominent at state level and dispel the established perception of the LM as a Hall party. The move was a risk as failure would have left the LM's main drawcard out of the spotlight entirely until a state election which was not due for another two years, but Hall said the party had no future unless it could gain national stature. Another possible problem was that the media could have lost interest in the LM at a state level regardless of whether Hall won a senate position. However it was a rare opportunity, because the election followed a double dissolution (the first since 1951), meaning that all Senate seats were up for election, and thus a candidate needed only 9.1% of the vote (after preferences) to win a seat, compared to 16.7% for an ordinary half senate election.

The battle between the LCL and the LM was not seen as a large part of the national campaign, as South Australia was only a small part of the nation and most of the marginal seats that would determine the outcome were in other states. The LM gained 9.9 per cent of the vote in the Senate and Hall was elected in his own right, without the assistance of preferences. In the House of Representatives, the LM gained 8.4 per cent of the vote across the 12 South Australian seats, ranging from a high of 18 per cent in metropolitan Boothby to 1.6 per cent in rural Angas. Fortunately for Hall and the LM, the senate election resulted in Labor and the Liberal-Country Party coalition holding 29 seats each, and Hall was one of two crossbenchers who held the balance of power. The media made much of Hall's position as a powerbroker at federal level, and the Liberals responded to him in a hostile manner; for his part, Hall continued to persistently attack them as outmoded and lambasted them over the matter of electoral reform.

Hall had abandoned his rural Yorke Peninsula-based seat of Goyder to stand for the Senate, and at the 1974 Goyder state by-election the LM were concerned about how their vote would stand without the assistance of its prominent incumbent and in an area outside their urban base; the LCL had always won the seat easily. The campaign was robust, with strong accusations being traded as what was previously a safe seat became evenly poised and the subject of frantic electioneering. Surprisingly, as the LM was an urban movement, they polled 46 per cent of the vote, which was enough for David Boundy to comfortably win the seat for the LM, with the help of Country Party preferences; in fact the LM two-party preferred vote was 62.6%. Despite most of its preferences flowing to the LM, the Country Party attacked the LM for perceived hypocrisy as they had run in a rural seat despite calling for the anti-Labor forces to be separated into urban and rural divisions. This continued to be a source of tension, as the LM continued to campaign in rural seats, prompting the Country Party to threaten to deny them preferences. The LM triumph embarrassed the LCL, and Eastick survived a leadership challenge from Heini Becker in the aftermath. Over the next year, the LM focused on building the party machinery.

=== State election 1975 ===
At the 1975 state election the LM had ambitions of becoming the largest non-Labor party. The campaign was focused primarily on accusations of mismanagement of the economy by Labor, with the LM seeking to positioning itself between the Liberals and Labor, as the centre-ground of South Australian politics. Advertisements attacked the Liberal Party for being a conservative party, and Labor for its perceived socialism and poor economic record. At the time, inflation and unemployment was increasing. The LM slogan was "Vote LM—You know it's right". Despite now being a federal senator, Hall was still synonymous with the LM at state level and he was central in the party's advertising. The momentum was against Labor, and it was expected that the election could come down to whether Labor would retain their marginal urban seats. The LM proposed to the Liberals to have a joint candidate in the marginal metropolitan seat of Gilles—which required a two-party preferred swing of 6%—to maximise their chances. The Liberals agreed but wanted the joint candidate to stand in Unley, and no agreement was reached.

Millhouse, now the State Parliamentary Leader of the LM, announced the LM's policy for the 1975 state election at the Adelaide Town Hall on 2 July. He outlined the LM's plans for economic rejuvenation: an end to compulsory unionism, budget and tax cuts, and measures to curb rising inflation and cost of living. Social policy included proposals for an early form of multiculturalism and promotion of 'cultural diversity' and bilingualism. Energy policy appealed to a new generation of environmentalists, and promoted conservation and promotion of solar power. He slammed the proposed City of Monarto as a 'monument to socialist folly'.

In the lower house, the LM retained both of their seats (Millhouse and Boundy), but won no new seats. Contesting 45 of the 47 seats, the LM commanded almost a fifth (18.2 per cent) of the vote in the lower house and the combined non-Labor forces gained 50.8 per cent of the two-party-preferred total. The LM was more effective in the city, recording 20.2% of the urban vote and 13.4% in rural areas. The party made several formerly safe Liberal seats marginal (including that of its leader, Eastick where they captured 20.3% in the rural district of Light). The LM withstood a concerted push by the Liberals to oust Millhouse from Mitcham, and retained Goyder. They were also strong in those seats held by LM members who did not break away during the split but stayed with the LCL. However, preferences did not flow as the non-Labor parties had wished, with up to 20 per cent of LM second-preferences flowing to Labor instead of the Liberals or Country Party.

In the upper house, the LM won two seats. They thus gained one seat, with Cameron joined by John Carnie. With the new proportional system in the Legislative Council after the electoral reforms, the LM captured 18.8% of the vote to end with 2 of the 11 seats available. This was enough to allow Labor and the LM to join and sidestep conservative Liberal opposition in the upper house.

The Liberals, having suffered a 12 per cent reduction in their metropolitan primary vote, and gained their lowest result, quickly dumped Eastick, who was an unimpressive parliamentary performer and seen as an obstacle to reintegration with the LM, as leader. Tonkin became the new leader, the first Liberal leader from a metropolitan seat. The federal Liberal Party was rattled by the strength of the LM, and tried to reintegrate them. Hall was offered a high position in the Liberal senate ticket if he rejoined, and a position in cabinet if the Liberals defeated the federal Labor government. The LM regarded its first state electoral performance as impressive, and optimistic with their future, they flatly rejected the overtures. However, they had also gone into debt to fund their election campaign. Millhouse also found it harder to dominate the Liberals and seize the momentum in parliamentary debate when proceedings resumed; he found Tonkin a much more formidable opponent than Eastick.

=== Federal election 1975 ===
The second consecutive double dissolution 1975 federal election in December was held owing to the dismissal of the Whitlam Government by Governor General John Kerr, and the subsequent appointment of federal Liberal leader Malcolm Fraser as caretaker Prime Minister. Prior to the dismissal, the Liberal Party had used its majority in the Australian Senate to block supply bills. Hall voted in favour of the supply bills being passed, and objected to the federal Liberals' actions. Hall had been praised for his stance on supply, but the Liberals attacked him, accusing him of being "Labor in a purple disguise" and saying that Fraser needed a compliant senate "not hampered by independents sitting on the fence". Hall countered by saying he was preferencing the Liberals and therefore not Labor-aligned, and that he was a "dedicated anti-socialist".

Hall saw the double dissolution as an opportunity to capture senate seats in all the states across the nation, and the LM sought to create bases outside South Australia. On 18 November, a LM rally was held at Melbourne Town Hall to launch a branch in Victoria. A branch was formed in Queensland and Hall travelled to Western Australia to oversee the formation of a state branch. Generally, the LM's attempts to spread its message failed owing to the dramatic and highly polarising effects of Whitlam's dismissal and the constitutional crisis, which produced angry demonstrations around the country. Amid the tumult, the media was almost completely focused on the two main parties, giving other groups almost no opportunities to capture the public imagination. The LM also found it difficult to establish a connection with the populace outside South Australia owing to its formation within a state-specific backdrop.

Attempts were made to expand the appeal of the LM through secret merger talks with the Australia Party, who initiated the idea, but these collapsed. The campaign was also hampered by the departure of two LM candidates who relabelled themselves as the Independent Liberal Movement. The first to leave the LM, C. W. Henderson, was a member of the LM Management Committee who criticised Hall's attempts to spread the party nationally. He accused Hall of having "delusions of grandeur", leading to his membership being suspended two days later. The next day, J. Henderson, the sixth member of the senate ticket, quit, saying he did not "want to be a puppet on a party string". Groves and Henderson aggressively campaigned against the LM, although they were to receive only 0.09% of the senate vote themselves.

When the election was held, there was a 12 percent swing towards the Liberal Party in South Australia, or 7 percent on two party preferred. There was a large swing against Labor owing to the dissatisfaction with the Whitlam administration, but it generally went directly to the Liberal Party. Against this background, and with relatively little media attention paid to the LM and its cause, Despite gaining prominence for his stance on supply, Hall struggled to be re-elected, gaining only 6.5 per cent of the Senate vote and relying on preferences, ironically from Labor. In South Australia, Labor gained 41 per cent of the vote, and the Liberals 51 per cent. In the lower house, the LM managed only 6.2% across the 12 seats, again recording its best result in Boothby, with 10.4%. Hall's hope for Australia-wide support for the LM was dashed owing to the previous events, with the party gaining negligible results for their candidates in other states. The lower house candidates in the Australian Capital Territory registered around 3%, but the senate candidates in Western Australia, New South Wales, Victoria and Queensland received less than 1%. Hall's opinion was that "the Liberal Movement was for its part in the contest happy to have survived." Nevertheless, Hall was still adamant the LM's future was as a standalone entity: "The LM is going to continue as an Australia-wide party ... We shall have to go through the sickening process of having the Liberal party make overtures to us once again ... I would like to tell them right now that they will be wasting their breath." Despite Hall's defiance, the poor showing meant his senate term was only to last for three rather than six years, and he no longer had the balance of power and the resulting media exposure. This was a problem, as the party was largely centred around his personality.

== Decline ==
Independent of the LM, the LCL had begun to change. It eventually supported Don Dunstan's bills for electoral reform, both to the House of Assembly and the Legislative Council, and its internal structure was reorganised and modernised, particular with the arrival of Tonkin, its first urban leader. The LCL renamed itself the South Australian Division of the Liberal Party of Australia to bring itself into line with its federal counterpart. Thus, many of the reasons for the LM's split had become null. Combined with the LM's declining membership (one third of members had not renewed) and its large debt, it found itself in a precarious position. Negotiations in 1976 began with the aim for the LM to merge into the new Liberal Party, and news of the secret talks were leaked in April. Once the news became public, Millhouse stated his complete opposition: "I will not rejoin the Liberal Party ... I have meant what I said in the past and I do not see any change in the attitude of the Liberal Party to alter my view." He said doing so would entail a surrender of honour and self-respect, and described the LM as the only "genuine Liberal party" in the nation, boldly predicting that its agenda would become dominant in society. Millhouse's stand was widely condemned by the media, who saw it as based on pride rather than pragmatism, and unhelpful for anti-Labor politics. Hall, however, wanted to unite the non-Labor forces, and acknowledged that "there is no prospect of maintaining LM electorate groups ... in simple terms, our alternatives are to swallow some little pride, and unite to fight Labor." He said to do otherwise would be to "exist in splendid selfish isolation", and said they could not survive as a relevant force by holding Goyder and Mitcham and losing upper house seats owing to a dwindling vote. Hall said the LM's reform agenda had been fulfilled, their finances were untenable and contended there was no ideological reason remaining for a split. This put him at increasing odds with Millhouse, who continued to describe the Liberals as "very conservative". Some members of the Liberals were also wary of a merger, owing to the long-standing antipathy between the two groups, and persistent criticism of them from the LM over the years.

In the meantime, the negotiations continued, with Hall prominent. During informal discussions following the 1975 state election, Millhouse had been offered the deputy leadership in a merged party, and Cameron a leading role in the upper house, but following the poor showing at the federal election and the deteriorating financial state of the LM, the offer was reduced and the posts that had been offered to Millhouse and Cameron were no longer available. However, Hall was still able to negotiate for the LM President and Treasurer to be given positions on a new executive. He also agreed to forgo any further senate bids. An agreement was put in place to protect Boundy from being ousted at a pre-selection of the new party, but this was broken at the next election. The LM was also given an equal voting share on pre-selection committees for three urban lower house seats.

Labor was not pleased with the prospect of its opponents being reunited and potentially more effective, and Premier Dunstan mocked the opposition parties as a "circus", while his deputy Des Corcoran predicted the new entity would not be able to last. The media continued to criticise Millhouse's defiance as disruptive.

When the LM voted narrowly in May 1976 to rejoin the Liberals (222 to 211), Millhouse immediately created the New LM, and became its only parliamentary representative. He tried to put an optimistic view on the matter, saying that the close-run vote as an endorsement of his position, and the merger as an opportunity to start with a clean slate with no debt. The merger was finalised on 4 June when the Liberals' State Council voted heavily in favour.

He was a prominent member of the Assembly, and a constant irritant to the Liberals, with whom he often sparred. When Don Chipp resigned from the federal Liberal Party, and stated his intention to create a centrist and progressive "third force" in Australian politics, Millhouse's New LM responded. Chipp's Australian Democrats was created, and negotiations began for a merger between the two parties. The New LM candidates at the 1977 state election stood under a joint New LM-Australian Democrats ticket, winning 12.3 per cent of the vote in the 12 electorates they contested, and Millhouse defeated the Liberal candidate in the lower house seat of Mitcham, which he would hold until resigning from parliament in 1982. The merger was finalised on 3 October 1977 and the New LM was absorbed into the Democrats. Meanwhile, the interstate branches of the LM, which had been in existence for only six months, either disbanded in 1976, or eventually evolved and merged into state components of the Democrats. The Western Australian division of the LM was the strongest interstate branch and renamed itself the Centre Line Party before becoming the state branch of the Democrats.

David Tonkin, an LM member before it split and became a separate party, had gained the Liberal party leadership in 1975, succeeding Eastick. He worked swiftly to heal the internal party wounds, and to re-establish the non-Labor forces and provide an effective opposition. The 1977 state election saw a decline in Liberal support, but the party gained power soon after the resignation of Premier Dunstan, with an 11 per cent swing at the 1979 state election, receiving 55 per cent of the two-party-preferred vote, though losing office after one term at the 1982 state election. The first Democrats MLC was also elected in 1979 on a first preference vote of 6.5 per cent. The Democrats continued to attract support, and held the balance of power in the Legislative Council for most of the time from the 1979 state election until after the 1997 state election.

== Parliamentarians ==
- Steele Hall
- Robin Millhouse
- Martin Cameron
- John Carnie
- David Boundy

All went back into the fold of the LCL successor, the South Australian Division of the Liberal Party of Australia, except for Millhouse who joined the New Liberal Movement (New LM), one of the predecessor parties that would form the Australian Democrats.
