= Charles Harrison (Australian politician) =

Australian politician

Charles Albert Harrison (5 February 1915 – 4 June 1986) (nickname Chookey) was an Australian politician. He represented the South Australian House of Assembly seat of Albert Park from 1970 to 1979 for the Labor Party.

Married to Elsie Rose Sanders.

Son of Charles and Lillian Harrison née Atkinson.

Buried in Lawn section of Cheltenham Cemetery.
