= Robin Millhouse =

Australian judge and politician (1929–2017)

The Honourable Robin Millhouse QC
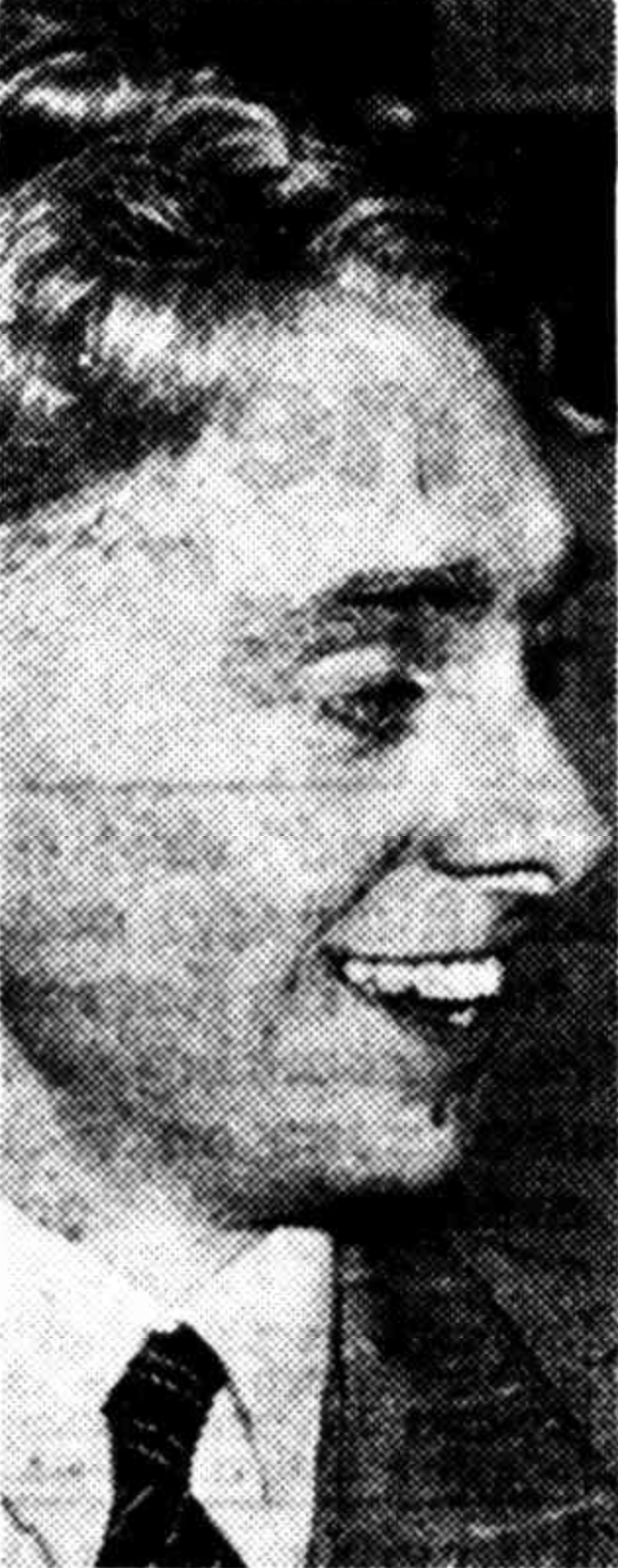

6th Chief Justice of Nauru
- In office 3 April 2006 – December 2010
- Preceded by: Barry Connell
- Succeeded by: Geoffrey Eames

Chief Justice of Kiribati
- In office 8 December 1999 – January 2011
- Preceded by: Richard Lussick
- Succeeded by: John Muria

Justice of the Supreme Court of South Australia
- In office 7 July 1982 – 8 December 1999

Deputy Leader of the Liberal and Country League
- In office 2 June 1970 – 19 March 1973
- Leader: Steele Hall; Bruce Eastick
- Preceded by: Sir Glen Pearson
- Succeeded by: John Coumbe

39th Attorney-General of South Australia
- In office 17 April 1968 – 1 June 1970
- Preceded by: Don Dunstan
- Succeeded by: Len King

Member for Mitcham
- In office 7 May 1955 – 7 April 1982
- Preceded by: Henry Dunks
- Succeeded by: Heather Southcott

Personal details
- Born: Robin Rhodes Millhouse; 9 December 1929 Adelaide, Australia
- Died: 28 April 2017 (aged 87) Sydney, Australia
- Party: LCL (1955-1973); Liberal Movement (1973-1976); New LM (1976-1977); Australian Democrats (1977-1982)
- Spouse: (Margaret) Ann Radford - Chief Guide of Australia
- Children: Three daughters and two sons
- Parent(s): Vivian Rhodes Millhouse, Grace Lilly Ayliffe
- Occupation: Barrister, politician, judge
- Known for: First elected member for the Australian Democrats

Robin Rhodes Millhouse, QC (9 December 1929 – 28 April 2017) was, at various times, the 39th Attorney-General of South Australia, the first Australian Democrats parliamentarian, and the Chief Justice of both Kiribati and Nauru and a judge of the High Court of Tuvalu.

== Early life and career ==
Millhouse was born in Adelaide, to lawyer Vivian Rhodes Millhouse (1902–1963), and Grace Lily (often Lilly) Millhouse, née Ayliffe (1900–1990). Millhouse gained an LLB from the University of Adelaide in 1951 after attending St Peter's College, Adelaide.

== Political career ==
While practising as a barrister, Millhouse entered the South Australian House of Assembly on 7 May 1955 as the Liberal and Country League (LCL) member for Mitcham, a safe LCL seat in southeastern Adelaide. Millhouse rapidly gained a reputation as both the intellectual driving force behind the LCL and an outspoken spokesperson for the urban middle class faction of the LCL, a group under-represented within the party hierarchy.

Millhouse ran for the LCL leadership pre-selection after the leader Sir Thomas Playford's retirement but lost to Steele Hall, another member of the LCL's progressive faction. Instead, following the LCL's return to power at the 1968 election, Millhouse was given the portfolios of Attorney-General, Aboriginal Affairs, Social Welfare, and Labour and Industry. In these roles, Millhouse gained a reputation as a crusader for progressive social change as he sought to position South Australia as a national leader on social issues. During 1969 Millhouse was the architect and the major proponent for abortion on health grounds in South Australia, a decision that he would come to regret decades later, when he claimed that it had become "abortion on demand". In the wake of the LCL's 1970 election loss, Millhouse was elected Deputy Leader of the Opposition on 2 June.

After the LCL also lost the 1973 state election, Millhouse resigned from the party on 18 March 1973 to form the Liberal Movement, along with former premier Steele Hall and a number of other senior LCL members, following growing dissatisfaction at the continuing conservatism of the LCL. He led the Liberal Movement at the 1975 state election, where the party received 18% of the vote, though only winning four seats.

In 1976, all Liberal Movement parliamentary members except for Millhouse returned to what by then had become the South Australia branch of the Liberal Party. Millhouse chose instead to form a new political party, the New LM, before it merged with the Australia Party, the Centre-Line Party and other like minded groups to form the Australian Democrats. As a sitting member, he became the first Australian Democrats Member of Parliament in 1977.

As a Democrat, Millhouse retained his seat of Mitcham at the 1977 and 1979 state elections. He continued to campaign for progressive social issues, including the introduction of a bill to legalise prostitution in South Australia.

== Judicial career ==
=== South Australia ===
Millhouse was made a Queen's Counsel in 1979. He resigned from parliament on 7 July 1982, sparking a by-election, upon accepting a position as a South Australian Supreme Court justice. He served on the Supreme Court until his retirement due to age in December 1999.

=== Further judicial appointments ===
At his retirement sitting, he announced his appointment as Chief Justice of the High Court of Kiribati, a position he held until January 2011. He was Chief Justice of Nauru from 3 April 2006 to late 2010.

Following his retirement as Chief Justice of Kiribati, he served as a judge of High Court of Tuvalu from February 2014 and March 2015.

== Personal life ==
He married Ann (died 1992) in 1957 and had three daughters and two sons. Millhouse died on 28 April 2017, aged 87.

Sir Eric Millhouse (1891 – 24 February 1950), lawyer and champion of returned soldiers, was an uncle.

Political offices
| Preceded by Don Dunstan | Attorney-General of South Australia; 1968–1970 | Succeeded by Len King |
Parliament of South Australia
| Preceded by Henry Dunks | Member for Mitcham; 1955–1982 | Succeeded by Heather Southcott |
