= Electoral district of Tea Tree Gully =

Former South Australian state electoral district

Coordinates: 34°47′31″S 138°45′22″E

Tea Tree Gully South Australia—House of Assembly
- State: South Australia
- Created: 1970
- Abolished: 1977
- Namesake: Tea Tree Gully, South Australia
- Demographic: Metropolitan

Tea Tree Gully was an electoral district of the House of Assembly in the Australian state of South Australia from 1970 to 1977. The suburb of Tea Tree Gully has since been represented by the seat of Newland.

== Member ==
Member	Party	Term
Molly Byrne	Labor	1970–1977
