= Peter Blacker =

Australian politician

Member of the South Australian Parliament for Flinders
- In office 10 March 1973 – 11 December 1993
- Preceded by: John Carnie
- Succeeded by: Liz Penfold

Personal details
- Born: 20 October 1941 (age 84)
- Party: The Nationals

Peter Douglas Blacker OAM (born 20 October 1941) is a former Australian politician who represented the seat of Flinders in the South Australian House of Assembly for the Nationals SA from 1973 to 1993. During that time he was the only Nationals member in the South Australian parliament.

As of 2017, Blacker is a member of the Country Health SA Local Health Network Health Advisory Council, and a former Chair of the Regional Communities Consultative Council.

He was awarded a Medal of the Order of Australia in the 2023 King's Birthday Honours List.

Parliament of South Australia
Preceded by John Carnie	Member for Flinders; 1973–1993	Succeeded by Liz Penfold
