= Electoral district of Pirie =

Former electoral district in South Australia

Coordinates: 33°11′9″S 138°1′1″E

Pirie South Australia—House of Assembly
- State: South Australia
- Created: 1970
- Abolished: 1977
- Namesake: Port Pirie, South Australia
- Demographic: Rural

Pirie was an electoral district of the House of Assembly in the Australian state of South Australia from 1970 to 1977.

Pirie was created after a boundary redistribution in 1970, essentially as a reconfigured version of Port Pirie. The last member for Port Pirie, David McKee transferred to the new Pirie.

The town of Port Pirie is currently located in the seat of Stuart.

== Members ==
Member	Party	Term
David McKee	Labor	1970–1975
Ted Connelly	Independent	1975–1977
