= South Australian National Party =

Political party in South Australia

South Australian National Party National Party of Australia (S.A.)
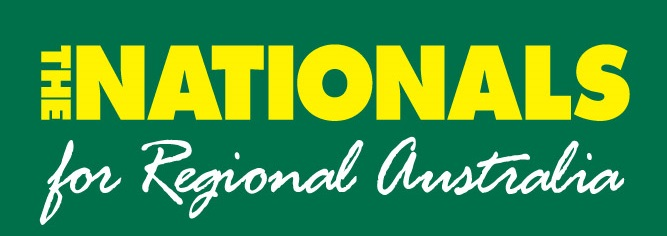
- Founded: 1964 (as South Australian Country Party)
- Headquarters: 6–8 Crush Terrace; Waikerie, South Australia
- Ideology: Conservatism; Agrarianism
- Political position: Centre-right

Website
- www.sanationals.org.au

The South Australian National Party (officially the National Party of Australia (S.A.), Inc.) is a political party in South Australia, and an affiliated state party of the National Party of Australia. Like the National Party of Western Australia, it is an independent party, and not part of the Liberal/National Coalition. First contesting the 1965 state election, the party has held two South Australian House of Assembly seats at alternating periods: Peter Blacker (1973–1993) in Flinders; and Karlene Maywald (1997–2010) in Chaffey.

== History ==
The Country Party had previously been affiliated in South Australia from 1917 to 1932, when it merged with the Liberal Federation to form the Liberal and Country League (LCL). The merged party affiliated with the new Liberal Party of Australia but retained the LCL name until 1974, when it adopted the name "Liberal Party of Australia (South Australian Division)".

In August 1964, T. G. Clark announced the formation of the "South Australian Country Party" as a fully autonomous organisation. He said that the party would seek affiliation with the federal party at a later date. Clark, the former general manager of a milk processing co-operative, was the chairman of the party's eight-member provisional committee, and said that the committee had met regularly over the previous year and that multiple branches had been formed.

In December 1965, the Australian Country Party Federal Council unanimously approved the South Australian party's affiliation with the federal party.

At the 1973 election, the revived party won a seat for the first time in Flinders, and finished second after preferences in five more LCL seats − Rocky River, Mallee, Alexandra, Goyder and Victoria.

The SA Nationals aligned themselves with the "Joh for Canberra" movement at the 1987 federal election.

Karlene Maywald was the MP for the Riverland seat of Chaffey from 1997 and the SA National Party parliamentary leader. She was re-elected at the 2002 and 2006 state elections (three other candidates were fielded in Flinders, Finniss, and MacKillop), announcing that she would support whichever party won government, which happened to be a landslide to the Labor Party.

Maywald became a minister in the first term of the Rann government. and signed an agreement with Mike Rann and the Labor Party for reserving the right to not vote with the government, whilst at the same time becoming the Minister for the River Murray amongst other portfolios to the benefit of her constituency. Positions accepted were Minister for the River Murray, Minister for Regional Development, Minister for Small Business, and later Minister for Water Security.

This informal ALP-NAT coalition (the first since 1935) caused uproar, with Christopher Pyne calling for Maywald's expulsion from the Nationals and Patrick Secker calling for a corruption enquiry into the appointment – neither eventuated.

The SA Nationals received a 6.6 percent primary vote at the 2009 Frome by-election. However, the party directed its preferences to independent Geoff Brock, allowing him to win the seat from third place. At the 2014 South Australian state election, The Nationals polled well below 1% of the primary vote for both houses of parliament. The party failed to nominate any candidates in 2018.

The South Australian Nationals have never been as dominant in rural areas as their counterparts in the rest of mainland Australia. Indeed, they are no longer a force of any real political significance in South Australia. Since Maywald's defeat in 2010, the party has never managed even 0.5 percent of the statewide vote. This is not only due to South Australia's status as Australia's most centralised state (some three-quarters of the population lives in Adelaide), but because the SA Liberals have built up healthy support bases in rural South Australia.

The SA Nationals have never been part of a formal Coalition with the Liberals, unlike their counterparts in most of the rest of Australia. However, had the SA Nationals won any federal seats in 2013, they would have been part of the Coalition.

== Electoral performance ==
=== House of Assembly ===
Election	Leader	Votes	%	Seats	+/–	Position	Status
1965		2,227	0.45	0 / 47	Steady	▲5th	No seats
1969		2,251	0.40	0 / 47	Steady	5th	No seats
1970		11,227	1.90	0 / 47	Steady	▲3rd	No seats
1973	Peter Blacker	24,810	3.94	1 / 47	▲1	3rd	Crossbench
1975	Peter Blacker	19,208	2.77	1 / 47	Steady	▼4th	Crossbench
1977	Peter Blacker	11,855	1.59	1 / 47	Steady	4th	Crossbench
1979	Peter Blacker	14,013	1.91	1 / 47	Steady	4th	Crossbench
1982	Peter Blacker	17,782	2.32	1 / 47	Steady	▲3rd	Crossbench
1985	Peter Blacker	14,056	1.72	1 / 47	Steady	▼4th	Crossbench
1989	Peter Blacker	10,217	1.18	1 / 47	Steady	4th	Crossbench
1993	Peter Blacker	10,157	1.11	0 / 47	▼1	4th	No seats
1997	Karlene Maywald	15,488	1.74	1 / 47	▲1	▲3rd	Crossbench
2002	Karlene Maywald	13,748	1.45	1 / 47	Steady	3rd	Crossbench
2006	Karlene Maywald	19,636	2.09	1 / 47	Steady	3rd	Coalition
2010	Karlene Maywald	10,279	1.05	0 / 47	▼1	▼5th	No seats
2014		1,328	0.13	0 / 47	Steady	▼6th	No seats
2018	Did not contest						
2022		5,279	0.48	0 / 47	Steady	▼7th	No seats
2026		1,427	0.1	0 / 47	Steady	▼13th	No seats

== See also ==
- List of political parties in Australia
