= Members of the South Australian House of Assembly, 1973–1975 =

This is a list of members of the South Australian House of Assembly from 1973 to 1975, as elected at the 1973 state election:

Name	Party	Electorate	Term of office
Ernest Allen	LCL/Liberal	Frome	1968–1977
Peter Arnold	LCL/Liberal	Chaffey	1968–1970, 1973–1993
Heini Becker	LCL/Liberal	Hanson	1970–1997
Peter Blacker	Country	Flinders	1973–1993
David Boundy ^{[3]}	LM	Goyder	1974–1977
Hon Glen Broomhill	Labor	Henley Beach	1965–1979
Dean Brown	LCL/Liberal	Davenport	1973–1985, 1992–2006
Max Brown	Labor	Whyalla	1970–1985
Allan Burdon	Labor	Mount Gambier	1962–1975
Molly Byrne	Labor	Tea Tree Gully	1965–1979
Ted Chapman	LCL/Liberal	Alexandra	1973–1992
Hon Des Corcoran	Labor	Millicent	1962–1968, 1968–1982
John Coumbe	LCL/Liberal	Torrens	1956–1977
Ernie Crimes	Labor	Spence	1970–1975
Peter Duncan	Labor	Elizabeth	1973–1984
Hon Don Dunstan	Labor	Norwood	1953–1979
Bruce Eastick	LCL/Liberal	Light	1970–1993
Stan Evans	LCL/Liberal	Fisher	1968–1993
Roger Goldsworthy	LCL/Liberal	Kavel	1970–1992
Reg Groth	Labor	Salisbury	1970–1979
Graham Gunn	LCL/Liberal	Eyre	1970–2010
Steele Hall ^{[3]}	LCL/LM ^{[1]}	Goyder	1959–1974
Charles Harrison	Labor	Albert Park	1970–1979
Hon Dr Don Hopgood	Labor	Mawson	1970–1993
Hon Hugh Hudson	Labor	Brighton	1965–1979
Reg Hurst ^{[2]}	Labor	Semaphore	1964–1973
Joe Jennings	Labor	Ross Smith	1953–1977
Gavin Keneally	Labor	Stuart	1970–1989
Hon Len King	Labor	Coles	1970–1975
Gil Langley	Labor	Unley	1962–1982
John Mathwin	LCL/Liberal	Glenelg	1970–1985
William McAnaney	LCL/Liberal	Heysen	1963–1975
Hon Dave McKee	Labor	Pirie	1959–1975
Terry McRae	Labor	Playford	1970–1989
Robin Millhouse	LCL/LM ^{[1]}	Mitcham	1955–1982
Bill Nankivell	LCL/Liberal	Mallee	1959–1979
Jack Olson ^{[2]}	Labor	Semaphore	1973–1979
Ron Payne	Labor	Mitchell	1970–1989
Allan Rodda	LCL/Liberal	Victoria	1965–1985
Keith Russack	LCL/Liberal	Gouger	1973–1982
John Ryan	Labor	Price	1959–1975
Don Simmons	Labor	Peake	1970–1979
Jack Slater	Labor	Gilles	1970–1989
Dr David Tonkin	LCL/Liberal	Bragg	1970–1983
Howard Venning	LCL/Liberal	Rocky River	1968–1979
Hon Geoff Virgo	Labor	Ascot Park	1968–1979
Ivon Wardle	LCL/Liberal	Murray	1968–1977
Charles Wells	Labor	Florey	1970–1979
Jack Wright	Labor	Adelaide	1971–1985

^{1} The LCL members for Goyder and Mitcham, Steele Hall and Robin Millhouse, resigned from the party in March 1973 and formed the Liberal Movement.
^{2} The Labor member for Semaphore, Reg Hurst, died on 31 March 1973. Labor candidate Jack Olson won the resulting by-election on 2 June 1973.
^{3} The Liberal Movement member for Goyder, Steele Hall, resigned on 11 April 1974 in order to run for the Australian Senate at the 1974 federal election. Liberal Movement candidate David Boundy won the resulting by-election on 8 June 1974.
