= Results of the 1970 South Australian state election (House of Assembly) =

South Australian state election, 30 May 1970 House of Assembly << 1968–1973 >>
Enrolled voters	635,533				
Votes cast	603,952		Turnout	95.03%	+0.55%
Informal votes	12,421		Informal	2.06%	–0.25%
Summary of votes by party
Party	Primary votes	%	Swing	Seats	Change
Labor	305,478	51.64%	–0.33%	27	+ 8
Liberal and Country	258,856	43.76%	–0.06%	20	+ 1
National	11,227	1.90%	*	0	± 0
Independent	8,842	1.50%	+0.47%	0	– 1
Democratic Labor	4,211	0.71%	–0.93%	0	± 0
Social Credit	2,401	0.41%	–0.44%	0	± 0
Communist	743	0.13%	–0.16%	0	± 0
Total	591,531			47	
Two-party-preferred
Labor		53.30%	+0.10%		
Liberal and Country		46.70%	–0.10%		

This is a list of House of Assembly results for the 1970 South Australian state election.

== Results by electoral district ==
=== Adelaide ===
1970 South Australian state election: Adelaide
Party	Candidate	Votes	%	±%
Labor	Sam Lawn	9,590	62.9	
Liberal and Country	Raymond Kidney	4,917	32.2	
Communist	Elliott Johnston	743	4.9	
Total formal votes		15,250	97.0	
Informal votes		463	3.0	
Turnout		15,713	93.7	
Two-party-preferred result
Labor	Sam Lawn	10,259	67.3	
Liberal and Country	Raymond Kidney	4,991	32.7	
Labor hold		Swing		

=== Albert Park ===
1970 South Australian state election: Albert Park
Party	Candidate	Votes	%	±%
Labor	Charles Harrison	10,112	68.0	
Liberal and Country	Valentine Dignum	4,754	32.0	
Total formal votes		14,866	97.1	
Informal votes		442	2.9	
Turnout		15,308	95.4	
Labor hold		Swing		

=== Alexandra ===
1970 South Australian state election: Alexandra
Party	Candidate	Votes	%	±%
Liberal and Country	David Brookman	5,830	60.0	
Labor	Kenneth Jared	2,520	25.9	
Independent	Lester James	1,373	14.1	
Total formal votes		9,723	98.8	
Informal votes		116	1.2	
Turnout		9,839	97.0	
Two-party-preferred result
Liberal and Country	David Brookman	6,903	71.0	
Labor	Kenneth Jared	2,820	29.0	
Liberal and Country hold		Swing		

=== Ascot Park ===
1970 South Australian state election: Ascot Park
Party	Candidate	Votes	%	±%
Labor	Geoff Virgo	9,455	63.2	
Liberal and Country	Maurice Senior	5,514	36.8	
Total formal votes		14,969	98.4	
Informal votes		244	1.6	
Turnout		15,213	96.0	
Labor hold		Swing		

=== Bragg ===
1970 South Australian state election: Bragg
Party	Candidate	Votes	%	±%
Liberal and Country	David Tonkin	9,476	66.9	
Labor	Andrew Mack	4,691	33.1	
Total formal votes		14,167	98.3	
Informal votes		244	1.7	
Turnout		14,411	93.6	
Liberal and Country hold		Swing		

=== Brighton ===
1970 South Australian state election: Brighton
Party	Candidate	Votes	%	±%
Labor	Hugh Hudson	8,471	53.9	
Liberal and Country	Trevor Griffin	6,679	42.5	
Democratic Labor	Ted Farrell	557	3.6	
Total formal votes		15,707	98.8	
Informal votes		186	1.2	
Turnout		15,893	96.1	
Two-party-preferred result
Labor	Hugh Hudson	8,555	54.5	
Liberal and Country	Trevor Griffin	7,152	45.5	
Labor hold		Swing		

=== Chaffey ===
1970 South Australian state election: Chaffey
Party	Candidate	Votes	%	±%
Labor	Reg Curren	4,296	44.3	
Liberal and Country	Peter Arnold	3,891	40.1	
National	Geoffrey Blight	1,353	14.0	
Independent	Patrick Barry	154	1.6	
Total formal votes		9,694	98.3	
Informal votes		167	1.7	
Turnout		9,861	96.3	
Two-party-preferred result
Labor	Reg Curren	4,870	50.2	
Liberal and Country	Peter Arnold	4,824	49.8	
Labor gain from Liberal and Country		Swing		

=== Coles ===
1970 South Australian state election: Coles
Party	Candidate	Votes	%	±%
Labor	Len King	8,802	54.5	
Liberal and Country	Graeme Sargent	6,898	42.7	
Democratic Labor	Gordon Kimpton	450	2.8	
Total formal votes		16,150	98.1	
Informal votes		313	1.9	
Turnout		16,463	97.0	
Two-party-preferred result
Labor	Len King	8,869	54.9	
Liberal and Country	Graeme Sargent	7,281	45.1	
Labor hold		Swing		

=== Davenport ===
1970 South Australian state election: Davenport
Party	Candidate	Votes	%	±%
Liberal and Country	Joyce Steele	10,298	68.0	
Labor	Anne Levy	4,835	32.0	
Total formal votes		15,133	98.2	
Informal votes		270	1.8	
Turnout		15,403	95.0	
Liberal and Country hold		Swing		

=== Elizabeth ===
1970 South Australian state election: Elizabeth
Party	Candidate	Votes	%	±%
Labor	John Clark	8,584	63.7	
Liberal and Country	Brian Marsden	4,160	30.9	
Social Credit	Thomas Keyes	736	5.5	
Total formal votes		13,480	97.8	
Informal votes		300	2.2	
Turnout		13,780	91.7	
Two-party-preferred result
Labor	John Clark	8,952	66.4	
Liberal and Country	Brian Marsden	4,528	33.6	
Labor hold		Swing		

=== Eyre ===
1970 South Australian state election: Eyre
Party	Candidate	Votes	%	±%
Liberal and Country	Graham Gunn	4,510	56.1	
Labor	Peter Kennedy	2,669	33.2	
National	Darrell Gillings	864	10.7	
Total formal votes		8,043	97.6	
Informal votes		193	2.3	
Turnout		8,236	92.5	
Two-party-preferred result
Liberal and Country	Graham Gunn	5,288	65.7	
Labor	Peter Kennedy	2,755	34.3	
Liberal and Country hold		Swing		

=== Fisher ===
1970 South Australian state election: Fisher
Party	Candidate	Votes	%	±%
Liberal and Country	Stan Evans	8,598	58.6	
Labor	Murty Conlon	5,128	35.0	
Independent	Valerie Lillington	942	6.4	
Total formal votes		14,668	98.8	
Informal votes		178	1.2	
Turnout		14,846	93.4	
Two-party-preferred result
Liberal and Country	Stan Evans	9,069	61.8	
Labor	Murty Conlon	5,599	38.2	
Liberal and Country hold		Swing		

=== Flinders ===
1970 South Australian state election: Flinders
Party	Candidate	Votes	%	±%
Liberal and Country	John Carnie	5,726	59.9	
Labor	Neville Cowan	3,248	34.0	
Democratic Labor	Douglas Barnes	586	6.1	
Total formal votes		9,560	98.4	
Informal votes		154	1.6	
Turnout		9,714	96.0	
Two-party-preferred result
Liberal and Country	John Carnie	6,224	65.1	
Labor	Neville Cowan	3,336	34.9	
Liberal and Country hold		Swing		

=== Florey ===
1970 South Australian state election: Florey
Party	Candidate	Votes	%	±%
Labor	Charles Wells	10,683	68.2	
Liberal and Country	Anthony Deane-Shaw	4,991	31.8	
Total formal votes		15,674	97.6	
Informal votes		388	2.4	
Turnout		16,062	95.7	
Labor hold		Swing		

=== Frome ===
1970 South Australian state election: Frome
Party	Candidate	Votes	%	±%
Liberal and Country	Ernest Allen	3,881	50.8	
Labor	Gerard Casanova	3,451	45.2	
Democratic Labor	John McMahon	302	4.0	
Total formal votes		7,634	98.2	
Informal votes		136	1.8	
Turnout		7,770	93.7	
Two-party-preferred result
Liberal and Country	Ernest Allen	4,138	54.2	
Labor	Gerard Casanova	3,496	45.8	
Liberal and Country hold		Swing		

=== Gilles ===
1970 South Australian state election: Gilles
Party	Candidate	Votes	%	±%
Labor	Jack Slater	8,186	55.4	
Liberal and Country	Donald Glazbrook	6,598	44.6	
Total formal votes		14,784	98.2	
Informal votes		264	1.8	
Turnout		15,048	95.6	
Labor hold		Swing		

=== Glenelg ===
1970 South Australian state election: Glenelg
Party	Candidate	Votes	%	±%
Liberal and Country	John Mathwin	8,329	53.7	
Labor	Alan Sexton	6,670	43.0	
Democratic Labor	Mark Posa	504	3.3	
Total formal votes		15,503	98.7	
Informal votes		197	1.3	
Turnout		15,700	95.6	
Two-party-preferred result
Liberal and Country	John Mathwin	8,767	56.5	
Labor	Alan Sexton	6,746	43.5	
Liberal and Country hold		Swing		

=== Gouger ===
1970 South Australian state election: Gouger
Party	Candidate	Votes	%	±%
Liberal and Country	Steele Hall	4,758	51.6	
Labor	Lloyd Hughes	3,736	40.5	
National	Ronald Crosby	731	7.9	
Total formal votes		9,225	98.9	
Informal votes		102	1.1	
Turnout		9,327	96.1	
Two-party-preferred result
Liberal and Country	Steele Hall	5,416	58.7	
Labor	Lloyd Hughes	3,809	41.3	
Liberal and Country hold		Swing		

=== Goyder ===
1970 South Australian state election: Goyder
Party	Candidate	Votes	%	±%
Liberal and Country	James Ferguson	5,615	61.4	
Labor	Robert Honner	2,685	29.3	
National	Francis McIntyre	851	9.3	
Total formal votes		9,151	98.8	
Informal votes		110	1.2	
Turnout		9,261	96.8	
Two-party-preferred result
Liberal and Country	James Ferguson	6,381	69.7	
Labor	Robert Honner	2,770	30.3	
Liberal and Country hold		Swing		

=== Hanson ===
1970 South Australian state election: Hanson
Party	Candidate	Votes	%	±%
Liberal and Country	Heini Becker	7,925	50.4	
Labor	Brian Smith	7,790	49.6	
Total formal votes		15,715	98.3	
Informal votes		264	1.7	
Turnout		15,979	94.8	
Liberal and Country hold		Swing		

=== Henley Beach ===
1970 South Australian state election: Henley Beach
Party	Candidate	Votes	%	±%
Labor	Glen Broomhill	8,918	57.9	
Liberal and Country	Alwyn Whiteford	6,483	42.1	
Total formal votes		15,401	98.1	
Informal votes		298	1.9	
Turnout		15,699	95.4	
Labor hold		Swing		

=== Heysen ===
1970 South Australian state election: Heysen
Party	Candidate	Votes	%	±%
Liberal and Country	William McAnaney	6,589	67.6	
Labor	Charles Greeneklee	3,165	32.4	
Total formal votes		9,754	97.7	
Informal votes		226	2.3	
Turnout		9,980	95.5	
Liberal and Country hold		Swing		

=== Kavel ===
1970 South Australian state election: Kavel
Party	Candidate	Votes	%	±%
Liberal and Country	Roger Goldsworthy	5,513	65.4	
National	Elmore Schulz	2,922	34.6	
Total formal votes		8,435	91.2	
Informal votes		810	8.8	
Turnout		9,245	96.2	
Liberal and Country hold		Swing		

=== Light ===
1970 South Australian state election: Light
Party	Candidate	Votes	%	±%
Liberal and Country	Bruce Eastick	4,963	53.4	
Labor	Brian Chatterton	4,101	44.1	
Independent	Eric Gerlach	227	2.4	
Total formal votes		9,291	98.5	
Informal votes		137	1.5	
Turnout		9,428	95.9	
Two-party-preferred result
Liberal and Country	Bruce Eastick	5,077	54.6	
Labor	Brian Chatterton	4,214	45.4	
Liberal and Country hold		Swing		

=== Mallee ===
1970 South Australian state election: Mallee
Party	Candidate	Votes	%	±%
Liberal and Country	Bill Nankivell	5,382	58.1	
Labor	Roland Telfer	2,225	24.0	
National	John Petch	1,654	17.9	
Total formal votes		9,261	98.7	
Informal votes		123	1.3	
Turnout		9,384	93.8	
Two-party-preferred result
Liberal and Country	Bill Nankivell	6,871	74.2	
Labor	Roland Telfer	2,390	25.8	
Liberal and Country hold		Swing		

=== Mawson ===
1970 South Australian state election: Mawson
Party	Candidate	Votes	%	±%
Labor	Don Hopgood	8,653	56.3	
Liberal and Country	Leslie Scott	6,719	43.7	
Total formal votes		15,372	97.8	
Informal votes		344	2.2	
Turnout		15,716	94.9	
Labor hold		Swing		

=== Millicent ===
1970 South Australian state election: Millicent
Party	Candidate	Votes	%	±%
Labor	Des Corcoran	5,016	54.0	
Liberal and Country	Brian O'Connor	4,273	46.0	
Total formal votes		9,289	98.5	
Informal votes		139	1.5	
Turnout		9,428	97.8	
Labor hold		Swing		

=== Mitcham ===
1970 South Australian state election: Mitcham
Party	Candidate	Votes	%	±%
Liberal and Country	Robin Millhouse	9,584	65.0	
Labor	Ronald Lock	5,157	35.0	
Total formal votes		14,741	98.4	
Informal votes		245	1.6	
Turnout		14,986	94.3	
Liberal and Country hold		Swing		

=== Mitchell ===
1970 South Australian state election: Mitchell
Party	Candidate	Votes	%	±%
Labor	Ron Payne	8,785	59.3	
Liberal and Country	Stephen Baker	6,020	40.7	
Total formal votes		14,805	98.3	
Informal votes		251	1.7	
Turnout		15,056	95.5	
Labor hold		Swing		

=== Mount Gambier ===
1970 South Australian state election: Mount Gambier
Party	Candidate	Votes	%	±%
Labor	Allan Burdon	5,253	54.8	
Liberal and Country	David Rogers	2,210	23.1	
Independent	Graeme Gilbertson	2,117	22.1	
Total formal votes		9,580	98.4	
Informal votes		157	1.6	
Turnout		9,737	94.2	
Two-party-preferred result
Labor	Allan Burdon	5,782	60.4	
Liberal and Country	David Rogers	3,798	39.6	
Labor hold		Swing		

=== Murray ===
1970 South Australian state election: Murray
Party	Candidate	Votes	%	±%
Liberal and Country	Ivon Wardle	4,916	50.1	
Labor	Gabe Bywaters	4,601	46.9	
Democratic Labor	Terence Critchley	174	1.8	
Independent	Clarence Tucker	119	1.2	
Total formal votes		9,810	98.6	
Informal votes		143	1.4	
Turnout		9,953	96.6	
Two-party-preferred result
Liberal and Country	Ivon Wardle	5,124	52.2	
Labor	Gabe Bywaters	4,686	47.8	
Liberal and Country hold		Swing		

=== Norwood ===
1970 South Australian state election: Norwood
Party	Candidate	Votes	%	±%
Labor	Don Dunstan	8,353	55.6	
Liberal and Country	Keith Bowman	5,804	38.6	
Democratic Labor	Kevin Bourne-McRae	546	3.6	
Independent	William Hann	327	2.1	
Total formal votes		15,030	97.9	
Informal votes		325	2.1	
Turnout		15,355	94.1	
Two-party-preferred result
Labor	Don Dunstan	8,598	57.2	
Liberal and Country	Keith Bowman	6,432	42.8	
Labor hold		Swing		

=== Peake ===
1970 South Australian state election: Peake
Party	Candidate	Votes	%	±%
Labor	Don Simmons	8,644	59.3	
Liberal and Country	Richard Leeton	5,925	40.7	
Total formal votes		14,569	97.6	
Informal votes		353	2.4	
Turnout		14,922	95.6	
Labor hold		Swing		

=== Pirie ===
1970 South Australian state election: Pirie
Party	Candidate	Votes	%	±%
Labor	Dave McKee	7,008	74.6	
Liberal and Country	John Bailey	2,393	25.4	
Total formal votes		9,401	97.9	
Informal votes		198	2.1	
Turnout		9,599	96.3	
Labor hold		Swing		

=== Playford ===
1970 South Australian state election: Playford
Party	Candidate	Votes	%	±%
Labor	Terry McRae	8,358	57.1	
Liberal and Country	Lloyd Duffield	5,207	35.6	
Social Credit	Frank Lawrence	1,078	7.4	
Total formal votes		14,643	98.1	
Informal votes		282	1.9	
Turnout		14,925	95.2	
Two-party-preferred result
Labor	Terry McRae	8,897	60.8	
Liberal and Country	Lloyd Duffield	5,746	39.2	
Labor hold		Swing		

=== Price ===
1970 South Australian state election: Price
Party	Candidate	Votes	%	±%
Labor	John Ryan	10,330	68.8	
Liberal and Country	John Dyer	4,692	31.2	
Total formal votes		15,022	96.7	
Informal votes		518	3.3	
Turnout		15,540	95.1	
Labor hold		Swing		

=== Rocky River ===
1970 South Australian state election: Rocky River
Party	Candidate	Votes	%	±%
Liberal and Country	Howard Venning	5,205	56.3	
Labor	Nathan Smith	2,602	28.1	
National	Jack Groves	1,446	15.6	
Total formal votes		9,253	98.7	
Informal votes		120	1.3	
Turnout		9,373	96.1	
Two-party-preferred result
Liberal and Country	Howard Venning	6,506	70.3	
Labor	Nathan Smith	2,747	29.7	
Liberal and Country hold		Swing		

=== Ross Smith ===
1970 South Australian state election: Ross Smith
Party	Candidate	Votes	%	±%
Labor	Jack Jennings	9,668	68.1	
Liberal and Country	Frank Forwood	3,617	25.5	
Independent	Roy Amer	903	6.4	
Total formal votes		14,188	97.6	
Informal votes		350	2.4	
Turnout		14,538	95.5	
Two-party-preferred result
Labor	Jack Jennings	10,119	71.3	
Liberal and Country	Frank Forwood	4,069	28.7	
Labor hold		Swing		

=== Salisbury ===
1970 South Australian state election: Salisbury
Party	Candidate	Votes	%	±%
Labor	Reg Groth	8,742	67.0	
Liberal and Country	Colin De Vos	3,711	28.5	
Social Credit	Philip Hobbs	587	4.5	
Total formal votes		13,040	97.6	
Informal votes		319	2.4	
Turnout		13,359	94.8	
Two-party-preferred result
Labor	Reg Groth	9,135	69.3	
Liberal and Country	Colin De Vos	3,905	30.7	
Labor hold		Swing		

=== Semaphore ===
1970 South Australian state election: Semaphore
Party	Candidate	Votes	%	±%
Labor	Reg Hurst	11,428	74.6	
Liberal and Country	Reginald Appelkamp	3,884	25.4	
Total formal votes		15,312	97.5	
Informal votes		389	2.5	
Turnout		15,701	94.6	
Labor hold		Swing		

=== Spence ===
1970 South Australian state election: Spence
Party	Candidate	Votes	%	±%
Labor	Ernie Crimes	11,116	75.7	
Liberal and Country	Frank Rieck	3,569	24.3	
Total formal votes		14,685	97.2	
Informal votes		424	2.8	
Turnout		15,109	95.3	
Labor hold		Swing		

=== Stuart ===
1970 South Australian state election: Stuart
Party	Candidate	Votes	%	±%
Labor	Gavin Keneally	7,080	76.0	
Liberal and Country	Richard Mould	2,238	24.0	
Total formal votes		9,318	97.1	
Informal votes		279	2.9	
Turnout		9,597	92.7	
Labor hold		Swing		

=== Tea Tree Gully ===
1970 South Australian state election: Tea Tree Gully
Party	Candidate	Votes	%	±%
Labor	Molly Byrne	9,291	59.4	
Liberal and Country	William Brassington	6,348	40.6	
Total formal votes		15,639	98.1	
Informal votes		302	1.9	
Turnout		15,941	95.5	
Labor hold		Swing		

=== Torrens ===
1970 South Australian state election: Torrens
Party	Candidate	Votes	%	±%
Liberal and Country	John Coumbe	7,823	53.9	
Labor	Mark Harrison	6,233	42.9	
Democratic Labor	Gary Lockwood	464	3.2	
Total formal votes		14,520	98.0	
Informal votes		292	2.0	
Turnout		14,812	92.8	
Two-party-preferred result
Liberal and Country	John Coumbe	8,218	56.6	
Labor	Mark Harrison	6,302	43.4	
Liberal and Country hold		Swing		

=== Unley ===
1970 South Australian state election: Unley
Party	Candidate	Votes	%	±%
Labor	Gil Langley	7,916	54.9	
Liberal and Country	Kevin Borick	6,025	41.8	
Democratic Labor	George Basisovs	474	3.3	
Total formal votes		14,415	97.8	
Informal votes		321	2.2	
Turnout		14,736	93.9	
Two-party-preferred result
Labor	Gil Langley	7,986	55.4	
Liberal and Country	Kevin Borick	6,429	44.6	
Labor hold		Swing		

=== Victoria ===
1970 South Australian state election: Victoria
Party	Candidate	Votes	%	±%
Liberal and Country	Allan Rodda	5,383	58.4	
Labor	Eileen Bennett	2,435	26.4	
National	Leonard Roberts	1,406	15.2	
Total formal votes		9,224	98.7	
Informal votes		121	1.3	
Turnout		9,345	95.6	
Two-party-preferred result
Liberal and Country	Allan Rodda	6,648	72.1	
Labor	Eileen Bennett	2,576	27.9	
Liberal and Country hold		Swing		

=== Whyalla ===
1970 South Australian state election: Whyalla
Party	Candidate	Votes	%	±%
Labor	Max Brown	4,798	56.9	
Independent	Charles Ryan	2,144	25.4	
Liberal and Country	Lesley Nicolson	1,032	12.2	
Independent	Hugh James	463	5.5	
Total formal votes		8,437	97.4	
Informal votes		224	2.6	
Turnout		8,661	93.3	
Labor hold		Swing		

- Preferences were not distributed.

== See also ==
- Members of the South Australian House of Assembly, 1970–1973
- Candidates of the 1970 South Australian state election
