= Members of the South Australian House of Assembly, 1970–1973 =

This is a list of members of the South Australian House of Assembly from 1970 to 1973, as elected at the 1970 state election:

| Name | Party | Electorate | Term of office |
|---|---|---|---|
| Ernest Allen | LCL | Frome | 1968–1977 |
| Heini Becker | LCL | Hanson | 1970–1997 |
| Hon David Brookman | LCL | Alexandra | 1948–1973 |
| Glen Broomhill | Labor | Henley Beach | 1965–1979 |
| Max Brown | Labor | Whyalla | 1970–1985 |
| Allan Burdon | Labor | Mount Gambier | 1962–1975 |
| Molly Byrne | Labor | Tea Tree Gully | 1965–1979 |
| John Carnie | LCL | Flinders | 1970–1973 |
| John Clark | Labor | Elizabeth | 1952–1973 |
| Hon Des Corcoran | Labor | Millicent | 1962–1968, 1968–1982 |
| John Coumbe | LCL | Torrens | 1956–1977 |
| Ernie Crimes | Labor | Spence | 1970–1975 |
| Reg Curren | Labor | Chaffey | 1962–1968, 1970–1973 |
| Hon Don Dunstan | Labor | Norwood | 1953–1979 |
| Bruce Eastick | LCL | Light | 1970–1993 |
| Stan Evans | LCL | Fisher | 1968–1993 |
| James Ferguson | LCL | Goyder | 1963–1973 |
| Roger Goldsworthy | LCL | Kavel | 1970–1992 |
| Reg Groth | Labor | Salisbury | 1970–1979 |
| Graham Gunn | LCL | Eyre | 1970–2010 |
| Steele Hall | LCL | Gouger | 1959–1974 |
| Charles Harrison | Labor | Albert Park | 1970–1979 |
| Dr Don Hopgood | Labor | Mawson | 1970–1993 |
| Hugh Hudson | Labor | Brighton | 1965–1979 |
| Reg Hurst | Labor | Semaphore | 1964–1973 |
| Joe Jennings | Labor | Ross Smith | 1953–1977 |
| Gavin Keneally | Labor | Stuart | 1970–1989 |
| Len King | Labor | Coles | 1970–1975 |
| Gil Langley | Labor | Unley | 1962–1982 |
| Sam Lawn ^{[1]} | Labor | Adelaide | 1950–1971 |
| John Mathwin | LCL | Glenelg | 1970–1985 |
| William McAnaney | LCL | Heysen | 1963–1975 |
| Dave McKee | Labor | Pirie | 1959–1975 |
| Terry McRae | Labor | Playford | 1970–1989 |
| Robin Millhouse | LCL | Mitcham | 1955–1982 |
| Bill Nankivell | LCL | Mallee | 1959–1979 |
| Ron Payne | Labor | Mitchell | 1970–1989 |
| Allan Rodda | LCL | Victoria | 1965–1985 |
| John Ryan | Labor | Price | 1959–1975 |
| Don Simmons | Labor | Peake | 1970–1979 |
| Jack Slater | Labor | Gilles | 1970–1989 |
| Joyce Steele | LCL | Davenport | 1959–1973 |
| Dr David Tonkin | LCL | Bragg | 1970–1983 |
| Howard Venning | LCL | Rocky River | 1968–1979 |
| Geoff Virgo | Labor | Ascot Park | 1968–1979 |
| Ivon Wardle | LCL | Murray | 1968–1977 |
| Charles Wells | Labor | Florey | 1970–1979 |
| Jack Wright ^{[1]} | Labor | Adelaide | 1971–1985 |

^{1} The Labor member for Adelaide, Sam Lawn, died on 25 May 1971. Labor candidate Jack Wright won the resulting by-election on 3 July 1971.
