= Candidates of the 1970 South Australian state election =

The 1970 South Australian state election was held on 30 May 1970.

== Retiring Members ==
=== Labor ===
- Tom Casey, MHA (Frome)
- Cyril Hutchens, MHA (Hindmarsh)
- Lindsay Riches, MHA (Stuart)
- Ron Loveday, MHA (Whyalla)

=== Liberal and Country ===
- Berthold Teusner, MHA (Angas)
- Ernie Edwards, MHA (Eyre)
- Glen Pearson, MHA (Flinders)
- Bryant Giles, MHA (Gumeracha)
- John Freebairn, MHA (Light)

=== Independent ===
- Tom Stott, MHA (Ridley)

== House of Assembly ==
Sitting members are shown in bold text. Successful candidates are highlighted in the relevant colour. Where there is possible confusion, an asterisk (*) is also used.

Electorate	Held by	Labor candidate	LCL candidate	Other candidates
Adelaide	Labor	**Sam Lawn**	Raymond Kidney	Elliott Johnston (Comm)
Albert Park	Labor	Charles Harrison	Valentine Dignum	
Alexandra	LCL	Kenneth Jared	**David Brookman**	Lester James (Ind)
Ascot Park	Labor	**Geoff Virgo**	Maurice Senior	
Bragg	LCL	Andrew Mack	David Tonkin	
Brighton	Labor	**Hugh Hudson**	Trevor Griffin	Ted Farrell (DLP)
Chaffey	LCL	Reg Curren	**Peter Arnold**	Geoffrey Blight (Nat); Patrick Barry (Ind)
Coles	Labor	Len King	Graeme Sargent	Gordon Kimpton (DLP)
Davenport	LCL	Anne Levy	**Joyce Steele**	
Elizabeth	Labor	**John Clark**	Brian Marsden	Thomas Keyes (Soc. Credit)
Eyre	LCL	Peter Kennedy	Graham Gunn	Darrell Gillings (Nat)
Fisher	LCL	Murty Conlon	**Stan Evans**	Valerie Lillington (Ind)
Flinders	LCL	Neville Cowan	John Carnie	Douglas Barnes (DLP)
Florey	Labor	Charles Wells	Anthony Deane-Shaw	
Frome	LCL	Gerard Casanova	**Ernest Allen**	John McMahon (DLP)
Gilles	Labor	Jack Slater	Donald Glazbrook	
Glenelg	LCL	Alan Sexton	John Mathwin	Mark Posa (DLP)
Gouger	LCL	**Lloyd Hughes**	**Steele Hall**	Ronald Crosby (Nat)
Goyder	LCL	Robert Honner	**James Ferguson**	Francis McIntyre (Nat)
Hanson	LCL	Brian Smith	Heini Becker	
Henley Beach	Labor	**Glen Broomhill**	Alwyn Whiteford	
Heysen	LCL	Charles Greeneklee	**William McAnaney**	
Kavel	LCL		Roger Goldsworthy	Elmore Schulz (Nat)
Light	LCL	Brian Chatterton	Bruce Eastick	Eric Gerlach (Ind)
Mallee	LCL	Roland Telfer	**Bill Nankivell**	John Petch (Nat)
Mawson	Labor	Don Hopgood	Leslie Scott	
Millicent	Labor	**Des Corcoran**	Brian O'Connor	
Mitcham	LCL	Ronald Lock	**Robin Millhouse**	
Mitchell	Labor	Ron Payne	Stephen Baker	
Mount Gambier	Labor	**Allan Burdon**	David Rogers	Graeme Gilbertson (Ind)
Murray	LCL	Gabe Bywaters	**Ivon Wardle**	Terence Critchley (DLP); Clarence Tucker (Ind)
Norwood	Labor	**Don Dunstan**	Keith Bowman	Kevin Bourne-McRae (DLP); William Hann (Ind)
Peake	Labor	Don Simmons	Richard Leeton	
Pirie	Labor	**Dave McKee**	John Bailey	
Playford	Labor	Terry McRae	Lloyd Duffield	Frank Lawrence (Soc. Credit)
Price	Labor	**John Ryan**	John Dyer	
Rocky River	LCL	Nathan Smith	**Howard Venning**	Jack Groves (Nat)
Ross Smith	Labor	**Jack Jennings**	Frank Forwood	Roy Amer (Ind)
Salisbury	Labor	Reg Groth	Colin De Vos	Philip Hobbs (Soc. Credit)
Semaphore	Labor	**Reg Hurst**	Reginald Appelkamp	
Spence	Labor	Ernie Crimes	Frank Rieck	
Stuart	Labor	Gavin Keneally	Richard Mould	
Tea Tree Gully	Labor	**Molly Byrne**	William Brassington	
Torrens	Labor	Mark Harrison	**John Coumbe**	Gary Lockwood (DLP)
Unley	Labor	**Gil Langley**	Kevin Borick	George Basisovs (DLP)
Victoria	LCL	Eileen Bennett	**Allan Rodda**	Leonard Roberts (Nat)
Whyalla	Labor	Max Brown	Lesley Nicolson	Charles Ryan (Ind); Hugh James (Ind)
