= Electoral results for the district of Goyder =

South Australian district election results

This is a list of electoral results for the Electoral district of Goyder in South Australian state elections.

== Members for Goyder ==
Member	Party	Term
James Ferguson	Liberal and Country League	1970–1973
Steele Hall	Liberal Movement	1973–1974
David Boundy	Liberal Movement	1974–1976
David Boundy	Liberal Party	1976–1977
Keith Russack	Independent Liberal	1977–1977
Keith Russack	Liberal Party	1977–1982
John Meier	Liberal Party	1982–2006
Steven Griffiths	Liberal Party	2006–2018

== Election results ==
=== Elections in the 2010s ===
2014 South Australian state election: Goyder
Party	Candidate	Votes	%	±%
Liberal	Steven Griffiths	11,968	53.7	−4.5
Labor	Elyse Ramsay	6,394	28.7	+1.6
Family First	John Bennett	1,633	7.3	+0.1
Independent	Bob Nicholls	1,126	5.1	+5.1
Greens	Graham Smith	744	3.3	−1.8
National	Kim McWaters	416	1.9	+1.9
Total formal votes		22,281	96.2	+0.2
Informal votes		878	3.8	−0.2
Turnout		23,159	93.5	−0.3
Two-party-preferred result
Liberal	Steven Griffiths	14,022	62.9	−2.8
Labor	Elyse Ramsay	8,259	37.1	+2.8
Liberal hold		Swing	−2.8	

2010 South Australian state election: Goyder
Party	Candidate	Votes	%	±%
Liberal	Steven Griffiths	12,524	60.2	+10.5
Labor	Christopher Hansford	5,243	25.2	−7.7
Family First	Jill Lawrie	1,486	7.1	−0.5
Greens	Joy Forrest	1,046	5.0	+0.5
FREE Australia	Dave Munro	499	2.4	+2.4
Total formal votes		20,798	95.7	
Informal votes		856	4.3	
Turnout		21,654	93.7	
Two-party-preferred result
Liberal	Steven Griffiths	14,212	68.3	+9.4
Labor	Christopher Hansford	6,586	31.7	−9.4
Liberal hold		Swing	+9.4	

=== Elections in the 2000s ===
2006 South Australian state election: Goyder
Party	Candidate	Votes	%	±%
Liberal	Steven Griffiths	10,310	50.1	−1.2
Labor	Aemon Bourke	6,709	32.6	+9.3
Family First	Robert Lawrie	1,558	7.6	+3.0
Greens	Dennis Matthews	928	4.5	+4.5
One Nation	Peter Fitzpatrick	552	2.7	−0.7
Democrats	Stephen Jones	523	2.5	−3.8
Total formal votes		20,580	95.6	
Informal votes		904	4.4	
Turnout		21,484	94.6	
Two-party-preferred result
Liberal	Steven Griffiths	12,169	59.1	−7.1
Labor	Aemon Bourke	8,411	40.9	+7.1
Liberal hold		Swing	−7.1	

2002 South Australian state election: Goyder
Party	Candidate	Votes	%	±%
Liberal	John Meier	10,446	51.3	−3.5
Labor	Ian Fitzgerald	4,740	23.3	+0.4
Independent	Stephen Redding	1,808	8.9	+8.9
Democrats	Richard Way	1,291	6.3	−7.7
Family First	Ian McDonald	925	4.5	+4.5
One Nation	Doug Holmes	690	3.4	+3.4
SA First	Alby Brand	480	2.4	+2.4
Total formal votes		20,380	96.9	
Informal votes		651	3.1	
Turnout		21,031	95.3	
Two-party-preferred result
Liberal	John Meier	13,501	66.2	−0.7
Labor	Ian Fitzgerald	6,879	33.8	+0.7
Liberal hold		Swing	−0.7	

=== Elections in the 1990s ===
1997 South Australian state election: Goyder
Party	Candidate	Votes	%	±%
Liberal	John Meier	10,617	55.2	−14.0
Labor	Chris Snewin	4,397	22.8	−0.4
Democrats	Colleen Kenny	2,595	13.5	+5.9
National	Andrew Runeckles	1,634	8.5	+8.5
Total formal votes		19,243	95.6	−2.3
Informal votes		884	4.4	+2.3
Turnout		20,127	94.4	
Two-party-preferred result
Liberal	John Meier	12,939	67.2	−5.3
Labor	Chris Snewin	6,304	32.8	+5.3
Liberal hold		Swing	−5.3	

1993 South Australian state election: Goyder
Party	Candidate	Votes	%	±%
Liberal	John Meier	13,960	70.0	+6.2
Labor	Charles Greeneklee	4,483	22.5	−6.2
Democrats	Richard Kenny	1,492	7.5	+1.0
Total formal votes		19,935	98.0	−0.4
Informal votes		415	2.0	+0.4
Turnout		20,350	95.9	
Two-party-preferred result
Liberal	John Meier	14,606	73.3	+4.9
Labor	Charles Greeneklee	5,329	26.7	−4.9
Liberal hold		Swing	+4.9	

=== Elections in the 1980s ===
1989 South Australian state election: Goyder
Party	Candidate	Votes	%	±%
Liberal	John Meier	12,641	62.1	+2.5
Labor	Brenton Walker	6,221	30.5	−5.3
Democrats	Derek Emery	1,507	7.4	+2.8
Total formal votes		20,369	97.8	+0.4
Informal votes		454	2.2	−0.4
Turnout		20,823	95.6	+0.6
Two-party-preferred result
Liberal	John Meier	13,518	66.4	+4.0
Labor	Brenton Walker	6,851	33.6	−4.0
Liberal hold		Swing	+4.0	

1985 South Australian state election: Goyder
Party	Candidate	Votes	%	±%
Liberal	John Meier	11,533	59.6	+2.6
Labor	Michael Wright	6,932	35.8	+5.8
Democrats	Rosemary Dow	898	4.6	+1.6
Total formal votes		19,363	97.4	
Informal votes		518	2.6	
Turnout		19,881	95.0	
Two-party-preferred result
Liberal	John Meier	12,077	62.4	−5.6
Labor	Michael Wright	7,286	37.6	+5.6
Liberal hold		Swing	−5.6	

1982 South Australian state election: Goyder
Party	Candidate	Votes	%	±%
Liberal	John Meier	9,468	60.6	−16.5
Labor	Stephan Oulianoff	3,437	22.0	−0.9
National	Terence Halford	1,832	11.7	+11.7
Democrats	Kevin Jones	881	5.6	+5.6
Total formal votes		15,618	95.5	−0.6
Informal votes		740	4.5	+0.6
Turnout		16,358	93.9	−0.2
Two-party-preferred result
Liberal	John Meier	11,725	75.1	−2.0
Labor	Stephan Oulianoff	3,893	24.9	+2.0
Liberal hold		Swing	−2.0	

=== Elections in the 1970s ===
1979 South Australian state election: Goyder
Party	Candidate	Votes	%	±%
Liberal	Keith Russack	11,772	77.1	+38.3
Labor	Roger Thomas	3,495	22.9	−0.6
Total formal votes		15,267	96.1	−2.5
Informal votes		621	3.9	+2.5
Turnout		15,888	94.1	−0.6
Liberal gain from Independent Liberal		Swing	N/A	

1977 South Australian state election: Goyder
Party	Candidate	Votes	%	±%
Liberal	David Boundy	6,088	38.8	+1.3
Independent Liberal	Keith Russack	5,907	37.7	+37.7
Labor	Roger Thomas	3,690	23.5	+4.6
Total formal votes		15,685	98.6	
Informal votes		226	1.4	
Turnout		15,911	94.7	
Two-candidate-preferred result
Independent Liberal	Keith Russack	9,082	57.9	+57.9
Liberal	David Boundy	6,603	42.1	
Independent Liberal gain from Liberal Movement		Swing	N/A	

1975 South Australian state election: Goyder
Party	Candidate	Votes	%	±%
Liberal Movement	David Boundy	4,563	45.4	+45.4
Liberal	Maurice Schulz	3,166	31.5	−20.0
Labor	Irene Krastev	1,811	18.0	+18.0
National	Richard Kitto	510	5.1	−25.8
Total formal votes		10,050	97.5	+2.5
Informal votes		260	2.5	−2.5
Turnout		10,310	95.7	−0.5
Two-candidate-preferred result
Liberal Movement	David Boundy	6,387	63.6	+63.6
Liberal	Maurice Schulz	3,663	36.4	−37.2
Liberal Movement gain from Liberal		Swing	N/A	

1974 Goyder state by-election
Party	Candidate	Votes	%	±%
Liberal Movement	David Boundy	4,399	46.3	+46.3
Liberal and Country	D D Gardner	2,880	30.3	−21.2
National	F D McIntyre	2,230	23.5	−7.4
Total formal votes		9,509	97.6	N/A
Informal votes		238	2.4	N/A
Turnout		9,747	92.4	N/A
Two-candidate-preferred result
Liberal Movement	David Boundy	5,954	62.6	N/A
Liberal and Country	D D Gardner	3,555	37.4	N/A
Liberal Movement hold		Swing	N/A	

1973 South Australian state election: Goyder
Party	Candidate	Votes	%	±%
Liberal and Country	Steele Hall	4,678	51.5	−9.9
National	Francis McIntyre	2,811	30.9	+21.6
Independent	Donald Gardner	1,597	17.6	+17.6
Total formal votes		9,086	95.0	−3.8
Informal votes		476	5.0	+3.8
Turnout		9,562	96.2	−0.6
Two-candidate-preferred result
Liberal and Country	Steele Hall	5,477	60.3	−9.4
National	Francis McIntyre	3,609	39.7	+39.7
Liberal and Country hold		Swing	N/A	

1970 South Australian state election: Goyder
Party	Candidate	Votes	%	±%
Liberal and Country	James Ferguson	5,615	61.4	
Labor	Robert Honner	2,685	29.3	
National	Francis McIntyre	851	9.3	
Total formal votes		9,151	98.8	
Informal votes		110	1.2	
Turnout		9,261	96.8	
Two-party-preferred result
Liberal and Country	James Ferguson	6,381	69.7	
Labor	Robert Honner	2,770	30.3	
Liberal and Country hold		Swing		
