= Electoral results for the district of Gouger =

South Australian district election results

This is a list of election results for the electoral district of Gouger in South Australian elections.

== Members for Gouger ==
Member	Party	Term
Albert Robinson	Independent	1938–1943
Horace Bowden	Labor	1943–1944
Rufus Goldney	Liberal and Country	1944–1959
Steele Hall	Liberal and Country	1959–1973
Keith Russack	Liberal and Country	1973–1974
Keith Russack	Liberal	1974–1977

Russack went to represent the Electoral district of Goyder from September 1977.

== Election results ==
=== Elections in the 1970s ===
1975 South Australian state election: Gouger
Party	Candidate	Votes	%	±%
Liberal	Keith Russack	4,580	46.5	−1.8
Labor	Peter Dewhurst	3,055	31.0	0.0
Liberal Movement	Desmond Ross	1,750	17.8	+17.8
National	Donald Herriman	465	4.7	−10.7
Total formal votes		9,850	98.1	+0.2
Informal votes		189	1.9	−0.2
Turnout		10,039	94.8	−0.5
Two-party-preferred result
Liberal	Keith Russack	6,560	66.6	+2.7
Labor	Peter Dewhurst	3,290	33.4	−2.7
Liberal hold		Swing	+2.7	

1973 South Australian state election: Gouger
Party	Candidate	Votes	%	±%
Liberal and Country	Keith Russack	4,502	48.3	−3.3
Labor	Peter Dewhurst	2,892	31.0	−9.5
Country	Ronald Crosby	1,439	15.4	+7.5
Independent	Patrick Carlin	489	5.3	+5.3
Total formal votes		9,322	97.9	−1.0
Informal votes		204	2.1	+1.0
Turnout		9,526	95.3	−0.8
Two-party-preferred result
Liberal and Country	Keith Russack	5,957	63.9	+5.2
Labor	Peter Dewhurst	3,365	36.1	−5.2
Liberal and Country hold		Swing	+5.2	

1970 South Australian state election: Gouger
Party	Candidate	Votes	%	±%
Liberal and Country	Steele Hall	4,758	51.6	
Labor	Lloyd Hughes	3,736	40.5	
National	Ronald Crosby	731	7.9	
Total formal votes		9,225	98.9	
Informal votes		102	1.1	
Turnout		9,327	96.1	
Two-party-preferred result
Liberal and Country	Steele Hall	5,416	58.7	
Labor	Lloyd Hughes	3,809	41.3	
Liberal and Country hold		Swing		

=== Elections in the 1960s ===
1968 South Australian state election: Gouger
Party	Candidate	Votes	%	±%
Liberal and Country	Steele Hall	6,557	56.8	−6.7
Labor	Edward Eaton	4,139	35.9	−0.6
Social Credit	Albert Apponyi	579	5.0	+5.0
Democratic Labor	Peter Meredith	261	2.3	+2.3
Total formal votes		11,536	97.4	0.0
Informal votes		305	2.6	0.0
Turnout		11,841	94.6	−0.8
Two-party-preferred result
Liberal and Country	Steele Hall	7,069	61.3	−2.2
Labor	Edward Eaton	4,467	38.7	+2.2
Liberal and Country hold		Swing	−2.2	

1965 South Australian state election: Gouger
Party	Candidate	Votes	%	±%
Liberal and Country	Steele Hall	5,384	63.5	−36.5
Labor	Robert Thredgold	3,094	36.5	+36.5
Total formal votes		8,478	97.4	
Informal votes		223	2.6	
Turnout		8,701	95.4	
Liberal and Country hold		Swing	N/A	

1962 South Australian state election: Gouger
Party	Candidate	Votes	%	±%
Liberal and Country	Steele Hall	unopposed		
Liberal and Country hold		Swing		

=== Elections in the 1950s ===
1959 South Australian state election: Gouger
Party	Candidate	Votes	%	±%
Liberal and Country	Steele Hall	4,376	72.3	+1.8
Independent	Thomas Freebairn	854	14.1	+14.1
Independent	Hector Henstridge	824	13.6	−15.9
Total formal votes		6,054	96.6	−0.2
Informal votes		212	3.4	+0.2
Turnout		6,266	96.6	+1.4
Liberal and Country hold		Swing	N/A	

- Preferences were not distributed.

1956 South Australian state election: Gouger
Party	Candidate	Votes	%	±%
Liberal and Country	Rufus Goldney	4,330	70.5	
Independent	Hector Henstridge	1,813	29.5	
Total formal votes		6,143	96.8	
Informal votes		205	3.2	
Turnout		6,348	95.2	
Liberal and Country hold		Swing		

1953 South Australian state election: Gouger
Party	Candidate	Votes	%	±%
Liberal and Country	Rufus Goldney	3,560	56.1	−14.4
Labor	Bernard McEwen	2,784	43.9	+14.4
Total formal votes		6,344	98.6	+0.8
Informal votes		89	1.4	−0.8
Turnout		6,433	96.9	
Liberal and Country hold		Swing	−14.4	

1950 South Australian state election: Gouger
Party	Candidate	Votes	%	±%
Liberal and Country	Rufus Goldney	4,036	70.5	+6.5
Labor	Archibald Riddoch	1,685	29.5	−6.5
Total formal votes		5,721	97.8	−0.2
Informal votes		127	2.2	+0.2
Turnout		5,848	95.6	+0.6
Liberal and Country hold		Swing	+6.5	

=== Elections in the 1940s ===
1947 South Australian state election: Gouger
Party	Candidate	Votes	%	±%
Liberal and Country	Rufus Goldney	3,537	64.0	+13.0
Labor	John Brown	1,991	36.0	−13.0
Total formal votes		5,528	98.0	+0.1
Informal votes		110	2.0	−0.1
Turnout		5,638	95.0	+4.8
Liberal and Country hold		Swing	+13.0	

1944 South Australian state election: Gouger
Party	Candidate	Votes	%	±%
Liberal and Country	Rufus Goldney	2,700	51.0	+3.0
Labor	Horace Bowden	2,595	49.0	+49.0
Total formal votes		5,295	97.9	−0.5
Informal votes		113	2.1	+0.5
Turnout		5,408	90.2	+25.4
Liberal and Country gain from Independent		Swing	N/A	

1941 South Australian state election: Gouger
Party	Candidate	Votes	%	±%
Independent	Albert Robinson	1,728	52.0	−2.8
Liberal and Country	Hedley Chapman	1,593	48.0	+2.8
Total formal votes		3,321	98.4	0.0
Informal votes		54	1.6	0.0
Turnout		3,375	64.8	−10.0
Independent hold		Swing	−2.8	

=== Elections in the 1930s ===
1938 South Australian state election: Gouger
Party	Candidate	Votes	%	±%
Independent	Albert Robinson	2,123	54.8	
Liberal and Country	Henry Crosby	1,751	45.2	
Total formal votes		3,874	98.4	
Informal votes		64	1.6	
Turnout		3,938	74.8	
Independent gain from Liberal and Country		Swing		
