= Electoral results for the district of Peake =

South Australian district election results

This is a list of electoral results for the Electoral district of Peake in South Australian elections.

== Members for Peake ==
Member	Party	Term
Don Simmons	Labor	1970–1979
Keith Plunkett	Labor	1979–1989
Vic Heron	Labor	1989–1993
Heini Becker	Liberal	1993–1997
Tom Koutsantonis	Labor	1997–2002

== Election results ==
=== Elections in the 1990s ===
1997 South Australian state election: Peake
Party	Candidate	Votes	%	±%
Labor	Tom Koutsantonis	8,804	46.7	+15.1
Liberal	Graham Parry	6,998	37.1	−9.2
Democrats	Sharon Robertson	3,067	16.3	+12.4
Total formal votes		18,869	95.9	+0.6
Informal votes		804	4.1	−0.6
Turnout		19,673	92.1	
Two-party-preferred result
Labor	Tom Koutsantonis	10,747	57.0	+12.0
Liberal	Graham Parry	8,122	43.0	−12.0
Labor gain from Liberal		Swing	+12.0	

1993 South Australian state election: Peake
Party	Candidate	Votes	%	±%
Liberal	Heini Becker	9,005	47.2	+6.6
Labor	Vic Heron	5,818	30.5	−17.0
Independent	Kym Buckley	2,074	10.9	+10.9
Democrats	David Lasscock	686	3.6	−5.4
Greens	Michael Lamb	550	2.9	+2.9
Independent	Harry Magias	358	1.9	+1.9
Natural Law	Timothy Brady	348	1.8	+1.8
Democratic Socialist	Melanie Sjoberg	242	1.3	−0.1
Total formal votes		19,081	95.4	+0.1
Informal votes		923	4.6	−0.1
Turnout		20,004	93.8	
Two-party-preferred result
Liberal	Heini Becker	10,613	55.6	+9.6
Labor	Vic Heron	8,468	44.4	−9.6
Liberal gain from Labor		Swing	+9.6	

=== Elections in the 1980s ===
1989 South Australian state election: Peake
Party	Candidate	Votes	%	±%
Labor	Vic Heron	8,965	51.9	−10.0
Liberal	Darcy Constantine	5,784	33.5	−1.9
Democrats	Stephen Crabbe	1,707	9.9	+5.3
Socialist Alliance	Philippa Skinner	422	2.5	+2.5
Call to Australia	Terry Lear	385	2.2	+2.2
Total formal votes		17,263	94.5	+1.5
Informal votes		1,004	5.5	−1.5
Turnout		18,267	93.5	0.0
Two-party-preferred result
Labor	Vic Heron	10,355	60.0	−5.7
Liberal	Darcy Constantine	6,908	40.0	+5.7
Labor hold		Swing	−5.7	

1985 South Australian state election: Peake
Party	Candidate	Votes	%	±%
Labor	Keith Plunkett	10,593	61.9	−3.1
Liberal	Steve Peake	5,401	31.6	+1.6
Democrats	Jeff Wild	794	4.6	−1.4
Independent	Ian Frances	313	1.8	+1.8
Total formal votes		17,101	93.0	
Informal votes		1,294	7.0	
Turnout		18,395	93.5	
Two-party-preferred result
Labor	Keith Plunkett	11,232	65.7	−1.3
Liberal	Steve Peake	5,869	34.3	+1.3
Labor hold		Swing	−1.3	

1982 South Australian state election: Peake
Party	Candidate	Votes	%	±%
Labor	Keith Plunkett	8,837	60.9	+3.1
Liberal	Laurie Whitelaw	3,928	27.1	−15.1
Democrats	Jim Mitchell	1,744	12.0	+12.0
Total formal votes		14,509	92.2	−1.4
Informal votes		1,223	7.8	+1.4
Turnout		15,732	92.9	−0.3
Two-party-preferred result
Labor	Keith Plunkett	10,077	69.5	+11.7
Liberal	Laurie Whitelaw	4,432	30.5	−11.7
Labor hold		Swing	+11.7	

=== Elections in the 1970s ===
1979 South Australian state election: Peake
Party	Candidate	Votes	%	±%
Labor	Keith Plunkett	8,319	57.8	−9.6
Liberal	Marko Milosevic	6,066	42.2	+9.6
Total formal votes		14,385	93.6	−3.2
Informal votes		982	6.4	+3.2
Turnout		15,367	93.2	+2.7
Labor hold		Swing	−9.6	

1977 South Australian state election: Peake
Party	Candidate	Votes	%	±%
Labor	Don Simmons	10,325	67.4	+6.7
Liberal	Mark Tregoning	4,989	32.6	+11.4
Total formal votes		15,314	96.2	
Informal votes		607	3.8	
Turnout		15,921	92.9	
Labor hold		Swing	+4.0	

1975 South Australian state election: Peake
Party	Candidate	Votes	%	±%
Labor	Don Simmons	8,341	54.1	−5.5
Liberal	Mark Tregoning	3,733	24.2	−16.2
Liberal Movement	Desmond Moran	3,349	21.7	+21.7
Total formal votes		15,423	95.1	−0.5
Informal votes		802	4.9	+0.5
Turnout		16,225	93.9	−0.7
Two-party-preferred result
Labor	Don Simmons	8,683	56.3	−3.3
Liberal	Mark Tregoning	6,740	43.7	+3.3
Labor hold		Swing	−3.3	

1973 South Australian state election: Peake
Party	Candidate	Votes	%	±%
Labor	Don Simmons	8,855	59.6	+0.3
Liberal and Country	Barbara Ashwin	6,003	40.4	−0.3
Total formal votes		14,858	95.6	−2.0
Informal votes		676	4.4	+2.0
Turnout		15,534	94.6	−1.0
Labor hold		Swing	+0.3	

1970 South Australian state election: Peake
Party	Candidate	Votes	%	±%
Labor	Don Simmons	8,644	59.3	
Liberal and Country	Richard Leeton	5,925	40.7	
Total formal votes		14,569	97.6	
Informal votes		353	2.4	
Turnout		14,922	95.6	
Labor hold		Swing		
