= Electoral results for the district of Hanson =

List of Australian election results

This is a list of election results for the Electoral district of Hanson in South Australian elections.

== Members for Hanson ==
Member	Party	Term
Heini Becker	Liberal and Country	1970–1974
Heini Becker	Liberal	1974–1993
Stewart Leggett	Liberal	1993–1997
Steph Key	Labor	1997–2002

== Election results ==
=== Elections in the 1990s ===
1997 South Australian state election: Hanson
Party	Candidate	Votes	%	±%
Liberal	Stewart Leggett	5,837	32.1	−15.1
Labor	Steph Key	5,773	31.7	−8.0
Independent	John Trainer	3,468	19.1	+19.1
Democrats	Pat Macaskill	1,871	10.3	+2.7
Independent	Mark Eckermann	734	4.0	+4.0
Independent	Dean Le Poidevin	344	1.9	+1.9
United Australia	Aleksander Wacyk	176	1.0	+1.0
Total formal votes		18,203	94.3	−1.8
Informal votes		1,110	5.7	+1.8
Turnout		19,313	90.6	
Two-party-preferred result
Labor	Steph Key	10,128	55.6	+7.5
Liberal	Stewart Leggett	8,075	44.4	−7.5
Labor gain from Liberal		Swing	+7.5	

1993 South Australian state election: Hanson
Party	Candidate	Votes	%	±%
Liberal	Stewart Leggett	9,086	46.3	+6.0
Labor	John Trainer	7,927	40.4	−8.4
Democrats	Pat Macaskill	1,504	7.7	−1.8
Independent	Joan Herraman	616	3.1	+3.1
Natural Law	Cherily Wilson	472	2.4	+2.4
Total formal votes		19,605	96.0	−0.1
Informal votes		821	4.0	+0.1
Turnout		20,426	92.3	
Two-party-preferred result
Liberal	Stewart Leggett	10,030	51.2	+6.1
Labor	John Trainer	9,575	48.8	−6.1
Liberal hold		Swing	+6.1	

- Hanson was made a notionally Labor held seat at the redistribution.

=== Elections in the 1980s ===
1989 South Australian state election: Hanson
Party	Candidate	Votes	%	±%
Liberal	Heini Becker	9,130	52.4	+3.5
Labor	Ian Peak	6,863	39.4	−8.0
Democrats	Mary McEwen	1,435	8.2	+4.5
Total formal votes		17,428	97.6	+0.3
Informal votes		419	2.4	−0.3
Turnout		17,847	94.1	+0.4
Two-party-preferred result
Liberal	Heini Becker	9,779	56.1	+5.2
Labor	Ian Peak	7,649	43.9	−5.2
Liberal hold		Swing	+5.2	

1985 South Australian state election: Hanson
Party	Candidate	Votes	%	±%
Liberal	Heini Becker	8,552	48.9	−2.1
Labor	Ann Pengelly	8,289	47.4	+5.4
Democrats	Ian Haines	650	3.7	−3.3
Total formal votes		17,491	97.3	
Informal votes		488	2.7	
Turnout		17,979	93.7	
Two-party-preferred result
Liberal	Heini Becker	8,895	50.9	−3.1
Labor	Ann Pengelly	8,596	49.1	+3.1
Liberal hold		Swing	−3.1	

1982 South Australian state election: Hanson
Party	Candidate	Votes	%	±%
Liberal	Heini Becker	8,720	55.1	−5.7
Labor	Derek Robertson	6,165	39.0	+5.7
Democrats	Clifford Boyd	936	5.9	0.0
Total formal votes		15,821	95.2	−1.2
Informal votes		804	4.8	+1.2
Turnout		16,625	92.7	−0.2
Two-party-preferred result
Liberal	Heini Becker	9,212	58.2	−6.3
Labor	Derek Robertson	6,609	41.8	+6.3
Liberal hold		Swing	−6.3	

=== Elections in the 1970s ===
1979 South Australian state election: Hanson
Party	Candidate	Votes	%	±%
Liberal	Heini Becker	9,459	60.8	+5.4
Labor	Peter Rowe	5,194	33.3	−11.3
Democrats	Stanley Gilbie	916	5.9	+5.9
Total formal votes		15,569	96.4	−0.6
Informal votes		578	3.6	+0.6
Turnout		16,147	92.9	0.0
Two-party-preferred result
Liberal	Heini Becker	10,044	64.5	+9.0
Labor	Peter Rowe	5,525	35.5	−9.0
Liberal hold		Swing	+9.0	

1977 South Australian state election: Hanson
Party	Candidate	Votes	%	±%
Liberal	Heini Becker	8,885	55.4	+18.1
Labor	Reece Jennings	7,150	44.6	+2.0
Total formal votes		16,035	97.0	
Informal votes		490	3.0	
Turnout		16,525	92.9	
Liberal hold		Swing	+1.1	

1975 South Australian state election: Hanson
Party	Candidate	Votes	%	±%
Labor	Terry Groom	7,440	42.1	−5.5
Liberal	Heini Becker	7,232	40.9	−11.5
Liberal Movement	Graham Slape	3,017	17.0	+17.0
Total formal votes		17,689	96.5	−1.8
Informal votes		636	3.5	+1.8
Turnout		18,325	92.6	−2.2
Two-party-preferred result
Liberal	Heini Becker	9,844	55.7	+3.3
Labor	Terry Groom	8,184	47.6	−3.3
Liberal hold		Swing	+3.3	

1973 South Australian state election: Hanson
Party	Candidate	Votes	%	±%
Liberal and Country	Heini Becker	9,022	52.4	+2.0
Labor	Brian Smith	8,184	47.6	−2.0
Total formal votes		17,206	97.3	−1.0
Informal votes		470	2.7	+1.0
Turnout		17,676	93.7	−1.1
Liberal and Country hold		Swing	+2.0	

1970 South Australian state election: Hanson
Party	Candidate	Votes	%	±%
Liberal and Country	Heini Becker	7,925	50.4	
Labor	Brian Smith	7,790	49.6	
Total formal votes		15,715	98.3	
Informal votes		264	1.7	
Turnout		15,979	94.8	
Liberal and Country hold		Swing		
