= Electoral results for the district of Price =

South Australian district election results

This is a list of electoral results for the Electoral district of Price in South Australian elections.

== Members for Price ==
Member	Party	Term
John Ryan	Labor	1970–1975
George Whitten	Labor	1975–1985
Murray De Laine	Labor	1985–2002

== Election results ==
=== Elections in the 1990s ===
1997 South Australian state election: Price
Party	Candidate	Votes	%	±%
Labor	Murray De Laine	11,314	63.4	+10.7
Liberal	Amber Del Pin	3,456	19.4	−13.5
Democrats	Phillip Thomas	3,078	17.2	+9.2
Total formal votes		17,848	95.3	−0.5
Informal votes		878	4.7	+0.5
Turnout		18,726	89.8	
Two-party-preferred result
Labor	Murray De Laine	13,279	74.4	+13.4
Liberal	Amber Del Pin	4,569	25.6	−13.4
Labor hold		Swing	+13.4	

1993 South Australian state election: Price
Party	Candidate	Votes	%	±%
Labor	Murray De Laine	10,098	52.7	−7.2
Liberal	Lawrence Liang	6,308	32.9	+2.9
Democrats	Alex Bowie	1,546	8.1	−1.4
Grey Power	Emily Gilbey-Riley	1,226	6.4	+6.4
Total formal votes		19,178	95.8	+0.5
Informal votes		832	4.2	−0.5
Turnout		20,010	92.8	
Two-party-preferred result
Labor	Murray De Laine	11,700	61.0	−4.9
Liberal	Lawrence Liang	7,478	39.0	+4.9
Labor hold		Swing	−4.9	

=== Elections in the 1980s ===
1989 South Australian state election: Price
Party	Candidate	Votes	%	±%
Labor	Murray De Laine	10,813	60.7	−8.7
Liberal	Bernice Pfitzner	5,282	29.7	+6.0
Democrats	Martin Kay	1,702	9.6	+2.7
Total formal votes		17,797	95.2	+0.4
Informal votes		904	4.8	−0.4
Turnout		18,701	94.3	+1.4
Two-party-preferred result
Labor	Murray De Laine	11,854	66.3	−8.0
Liberal	Bernice Pfitzner	5,943	33.4	+8.0
Labor hold		Swing	−8.0	

1985 South Australian state election: Price
Party	Candidate	Votes	%	±%
Labor	Murray De Laine	12,163	69.4	−4.6
Liberal	Jean Lawrie	4,144	23.7	−1.3
Democrats	Don Bond	1,216	6.9	+5.9
Total formal votes		17,523	94.8	
Informal votes		961	5.2	
Turnout		18,484	92.9	
Two-party-preferred result
Labor	Murray De Laine	13,025	74.3	−0.7
Liberal	Jean Lawrie	4,498	25.7	+0.7
Labor hold		Swing	−0.7	

1982 South Australian state election: Price
Party	Candidate	Votes	%	±%
Labor	George Whitten	8,753	66.1	+9.7
Liberal	Sue Crew	4,488	33.9	+1.3
Total formal votes		13,241	89.0	−3.6
Informal votes		1,634	11.0	+3.6
Turnout		14,875	94.1	+1.7
Labor hold		Swing	+5.6	

=== Elections in the 1970s ===
1979 South Australian state election: Price
Party	Candidate	Votes	%	±%
Labor	George Whitten	7,694	56.4	−13.0
Liberal	David Beames	4,448	32.6	+2.0
Democrats	Robert Manhire	1,507	11.0	+11.0
Total formal votes		13,649	92.6	−3.0
Informal votes		1,092	7.4	+3.0
Turnout		14,741	92.8	−0.4
Two-party-preferred result
Labor	George Whitten	8,262	60.5	−8.9
Liberal	David Beames	5,387	39.5	+8.9
Labor hold		Swing	−8.9	

1977 South Australian state election: Price
Party	Candidate	Votes	%	±%
Labor	George Whitten	10,304	69.4	+8.8
Liberal	Jean Lawrie	4,545	30.6	+8.0
Total formal votes		14,849	95.6	
Informal votes		676	4.4	
Turnout		15,525	93.2	
Labor hold		Swing	+6.3	

1975 South Australian state election: Price
Party	Candidate	Votes	%	±%
Labor	George Whitten	8,944	60.6	−4.0
Liberal	Terence Hanson	3,338	22.6	−2.9
Liberal Movement	Jean Lawrie	2,474	16.8	+16.8
Total formal votes		14,756	92.9	−1.6
Informal votes		1,135	7.1	+1.6
Turnout		15,891	93.9	−0.4
Two-party-preferred result
Labor	George Whitten	9,192	62.3	−10.2
Liberal	Terence Hanson	5,563	37.7	+10.2
Labor hold		Swing	−10.2	

1973 South Australian state election: Price
Party	Candidate	Votes	%	±%
Labor	John Ryan	9,396	64.6	−4.2
Liberal and Country	Jean Lawrie	3,718	25.5	−5.7
Independent	Julie Dearing	1,442	9.9	+9.9
Total formal votes		14,556	94.5	−2.2
Informal votes		852	5.5	+2.2
Turnout		15,408	94.3	−0.8
Two-party-preferred result
Labor	John Ryan	10,553	72.5	+3.7
Liberal and Country	Jean Lawrie	4,003	27.5	−3.7
Labor hold		Swing	+3.7	

1970 South Australian state election: Price
Party	Candidate	Votes	%	±%
Labor	John Ryan	10,330	68.8	
Liberal and Country	John Dyer	4,692	31.2	
Total formal votes		15,022	96.7	
Informal votes		518	3.3	
Turnout		15,540	95.1	
Labor hold		Swing		
