= Electoral results for the district of Semaphore =

South Australian district election results

This is a list of election results for the electoral district of Semaphore in South Australian elections.

== Members for Semaphore ==
Member	Party	Term
Albert Thompson	Labor	1938–1946
Harold Tapping	Labor	1946–1964
Reg Hurst	Labor	1964–1973
Jack Olson	Labor	1973–1979
Norm Peterson	Independent	1979–1993

== Election results ==
=== Elections in the 1980s ===
1989 South Australian state election: Semaphore
Party	Candidate	Votes	%	±%
Independent	Norm Peterson	7,210	40.0	−1.7
Labor	Kevin Foley	6,069	33.7	−7.3
Liberal	Terence Daviess	3,655	20.2	+3.9
Democrats	Eric Mack	1,097	6.1	+5.1
Total formal votes		18,031	97.3	+0.2
Informal votes		494	2.7	−0.2
Turnout		18,525	94.5	+0.1
Two-party-preferred result
Labor	Kevin Foley	12,712	70.5	−4.5
Liberal	Terence Daviess	5,319	29.5	+4.5
Two-candidate-preferred result
Independent	Norm Peterson	11,319	62.8	+5.5
Labor	Kevin Foley	6,712	37.2	−5.5
Independent hold		Swing	+5.5	

1985 South Australian state election: Semaphore
Party	Candidate	Votes	%	±%
Independent Labor	Norm Peterson	7,226	41.7	−3.3
Labor	Rod Sawford	7,104	41.0	+15.0
Liberal	Mark Laing	2,831	16.3	−11.7
Democrats	F Goncalves	177	1.0	+1.0
Total formal votes		17,338	97.1	
Informal votes		526	2.9	
Turnout		17,864	94.4	
Two-candidate-preferred result
Independent Labor	Norm Peterson	9,939	57.3	
Labor	Rod Sawford	7,399	42.7	
Independent Labor hold		Swing	N/A	

1982 South Australian state election: Semaphore
Party	Candidate	Votes	%	±%
Independent	Norm Peterson	7,915	46.8	+15.1
Labor	Peter Bicknell	6,462	38.2	+2.3
Liberal	Macleay Lawrie	2,244	13.3	−14.7
Democrats	Peter Gagliardi	295	1.7	−2.7
Total formal votes		16,916	94.9	+0.5
Informal votes		910	5.1	−0.5
Turnout		17,826	93.4	−1.2
Two-candidate-preferred result
Independent	Norm Peterson	10,207	60.3	−1.9
Labor	Peter Bicknell	6,709	39.7	+1.9
Independent hold		Swing	−1.9	

=== Elections in the 1970s ===
1979 South Australian state election: Semaphore
Party	Candidate	Votes	%	±%
Labor	George Apap	5,778	35.9	−34.9
Independent Labor	Norm Peterson	5,106	31.7	+31.7
Liberal	Mac Lawrie	4,500	28.0	+0.9
Democrats	Dean Richards	715	4.4	+4.4
Total formal votes		16,099	94.4	−2.7
Informal votes		957	5.6	+2.7
Turnout		17,056	94.6	+1.4
Two-candidate-preferred result
Independent Labor	Norm Peterson	10,022	62.2	+62.2
Labor	George Apap	6,077	37.8	−34.4
Independent Labor gain from Labor		Swing	N/A	

1977 South Australian state election: Semaphore
Party	Candidate	Votes	%	±%
Labor	Jack Olson	11,601	70.8	+0.3
Liberal	Terence Hanson	4,447	27.1	+11.1
Socialist	J Mitchell	343	2.1	+2.1
Total formal votes		16,391	97.1	
Informal votes		481	2.9	
Turnout		16,872	93.2	
Two-party-preferred result
Labor	Jack Olson	11,833	72.2	−0.3
Liberal	Terence Hanson	4,558	27.8	+0.3
Labor hold		Swing	−0.3	

1975 South Australian state election: Semaphore
Party	Candidate	Votes	%	±%
Labor	Jack Olson	11,813	69.9	−2.8
Liberal	Willem Van Wyk	2,732	16.2	−7.4
Liberal Movement	Rodney Sporn	2,348	13.9	+13.9
Total formal votes		16,893	94.8	−0.9
Informal votes		929	5.2	+0.9
Turnout		17,822	95.1	+0.3
Two-party-preferred result
Labor	Jack Olson	12,045	71.3	−4.7
Liberal	Willem Van Wyk	4,848	28.7	+4.7
Labor hold		Swing	−4.7	

1973 South Australian state election: Semaphore
Party	Candidate	Votes	%	±%
Labor	Reg Hurst	11,472	72.7	−1.9
Liberal and Country	John Howarth	3,729	23.6	−1.8
Socialist	Keith Waye	576	3.7	+3.7
Total formal votes		15,777	95.7	−1.8
Informal votes		701	4.3	+1.8
Turnout		16,478	94.8	+0.2
Two-party-preferred result
Labor	Reg Hurst	11,991	76.0	+1.4
Liberal and Country	John Howarth	3,786	24.0	−1.4
Labor hold		Swing	+1.4	

1970 South Australian state election: Semaphore
Party	Candidate	Votes	%	±%
Labor	Reg Hurst	11,428	74.6	
Liberal and Country	Reginald Appelkamp	3,884	25.4	
Total formal votes		15,312	97.5	
Informal votes		389	2.5	
Turnout		15,701	94.6	
Labor hold		Swing		

=== Elections in the 1960s ===
1968 South Australian state election: Semaphore
Party	Candidate	Votes	%	±%
Labor	Reg Hurst	15,613	69.6	−8.5
Liberal and Country	Reginald Appelkamp	6,076	27.1	+27.1
Social Credit	Edward Wright	731	3.3	−5.4
Total formal votes		22,520	97.0	+2.1
Informal votes		692	3.0	−2.1
Turnout		23,112	95.1	−0.4
Two-party-preferred result
Labor	Reg Hurst	15,978	71.3	−0.7
Liberal and Country	Reginald Appelkamp	6,442	28.7	+28.7
Labor hold		Swing	N/A	

1965 South Australian state election: Semaphore
Party	Candidate	Votes	%	±%
Labor	Reg Hurst	16,430	78.1	−21.9
Democratic Labor	Charles Coffey	2,747	13.1	+13.1
Social Credit	George Heritage	1,821	8.7	+8.7
Total formal votes		21,028	94.9	
Informal votes		1,116	5.1	
Turnout		22,144	95.5	
Two-candidate-preferred result
Labor	Reg Hurst	17,341	82.5	−17.5
Democratic Labor	Charles Coffey	3,687	17.5	+17.5
Labor hold		Swing	N/A	

1962 South Australian state election: Semaphore
Party	Candidate	Votes	%	±%
Labor	Harold Tapping	unopposed		
Labor hold		Swing		

=== Elections in the 1950s ===
1959 South Australian state election: Semaphore
Party	Candidate	Votes	%	±%
Labor	Harold Tapping	18,246	92.2	−7.8
Communist	James Mitchell	1,539	7.8	+7.8
Total formal votes		19,785	94.4	
Informal votes		1,166	5.6	
Turnout		20,951	94.1	
Labor hold		Swing	N/A	

1956 South Australian state election: Semaphore
Party	Candidate	Votes	%	±%
Labor	Harold Tapping	unopposed		
Labor hold		Swing		

1953 South Australian state election: Semaphore
Party	Candidate	Votes	%	±%
Labor	Harold Tapping	19,043	87.6	+7.1
Independent	Roy Luckman	2,693	12.4	+12.4
Total formal votes		21,736	95.4	+1.2
Informal votes		1,037	4.6	−1.2
Turnout		22,773	93.9	+1.8
Labor hold		Swing	N/A	

1950 South Australian state election: Semaphore
Party	Candidate	Votes	%	±%
Labor	Harold Tapping	15,173	80.5	−19.5
Independent	Joseph Talbot	3,681	19.5	+19.5
Total formal votes		18,854	94.2	
Informal votes		1,155	5.8	
Turnout		20,009	92.1	
Labor hold		Swing	N/A	

=== Elections in the 1940s ===
1947 South Australian state election: Semaphore
Party	Candidate	Votes	%	±%
Labor	Harold Tapping	unopposed		
Labor hold		Swing		

1944 South Australian state election: Semaphore
Party	Candidate	Votes	%	±%
Labor	Albert Thompson	unopposed		
Labor hold		Swing		

1941 South Australian state election: Semaphore
Party	Candidate	Votes	%	±%
Labor	Albert Thompson	3,883	64.3	+5.9
Independent	H J Harden	2,158	35.7	+35.7
Total formal votes		6,041	96.6	−1.0
Informal votes		214	3.4	+1.0
Turnout		6,255	38.4	−17.8
Labor hold		Swing	N/A	

=== Elections in the 1930s ===
1938 South Australian state election: Semaphore
Party	Candidate	Votes	%	±%
Labor	Albert Thompson	4,849	58.4	
Independent	Charles Grant	1,261	15.2	
Independent	Harry Bray	1,211	14.6	
Independent	Herbert Guthrie	984	11.8	
Total formal votes		8,305	97.6	
Informal votes		203	2.4	
Turnout		8,508	56.2	
Labor hold		Swing		
