= Jack Olson =

Jack Olson may refer to:

- Jack B. Olson (1920–2003), American businessman and politician
- Jack Olson (Australian politician) (1916–2008), member of the South Australian House of Assembly
