= Johannes Becker =

Johannes Becker may refer to:

- Johann Becker (politician) (1869–1951), German politician
- Johannes Heinrich Becker (1898–1961), German-born leader of the Nazi Party of Australia
- Johannes Siegfried Becker, German spy in South America during World War II as part of Operation Bolívar
