= 1973 Semaphore state by-election =

The 1973 Semaphore state by-election was a by-election held on 2 June 1973 for the South Australian House of Assembly seat of Semaphore. This was triggered by the death of state Labor MHA Reg Hurst. The seat had been retained by Labor since it was created and first contested at the 1970 state election.

== Results ==
The Socialist Party, who contested the previous election on 3.7 percent of the vote, did not contest the by-election. Labor easily retained the seat.

Semaphore state by-election, 2 June 1973
Party	Candidate	Votes	%	±%
Labor	Jack Olson	9,959	71.9	−0.8
Liberal and Country	John Howarth	3,892	28.1	+4.5
Total formal votes		13,851	96.2	+0.5
Informal votes		542	3.8	−0.5
Turnout		14,393	81.3	−13.5
Labor hold		Swing	N/A	

== See also ==
- List of South Australian state by-elections
