= Electoral results for the district of Ashford =

South Australian district election results

This is a list of electoral results for the Electoral district of Ashford in South Australian state elections from the district's first election in 1997 until the 2018 state election, when the seat was abolished allowing the 2016 electoral redistribution.

== Members for Ashford ==
Member	Party	Term
Steph Key	Labor Party	2002–2018

== Election results ==
=== Elections in the 2010s ===
2014 South Australian state election: Ashford
Party	Candidate	Votes	%	±%
Liberal	Terina Monteagle	9,335	43.1	+0.6
Labor	Steph Key	8,597	39.7	−0.3
Greens	Christiana Griffith	2,654	12.2	−0.4
Family First	Robyn Munro	841	3.9	−0.4
FREE Australia	Steve Sansom	247	1.1	+1.1
Total formal votes		21,674	96.9	−0.1
Informal votes		700	3.1	+0.1
Turnout		22,374	92.4	+0.6
Two-party-preferred result
Labor	Steph Key	11,247	51.9	+1.3
Liberal	Terina Monteagle	10,427	48.1	−1.3
Labor hold		Swing	+1.3	

2010 South Australian state election: Ashford
Party	Candidate	Votes	%	±%
Labor	Steph Key	9,218	43.5	−8.9
Liberal	Penny Pratt	8,220	38.7	+10.9
Greens	Jennifer Bonham	2,806	13.2	+3.8
Family First	Robyn Munro	969	4.6	−0.2
Total formal votes		21,213	96.8	
Informal votes		664	3.2	
Turnout		21,877	91.8	
Two-party-preferred result
Labor	Steph Key	11,625	54.8	−10.4
Liberal	Penny Pratt	9,588	45.2	+10.4
Labor hold		Swing	−10.4	

=== Elections in the 2000s ===
2006 South Australian state election: Ashford
Party	Candidate	Votes	%	±%
Labor	Steph Key	10,667	53.3	+12.6
Liberal	Kevin Kaeding	5,396	26.9	−10.2
Greens	Peter Hastwell	1,828	9.1	+3.7
Family First	Robyn Munro	1,002	5.0	+2.0
Democrats	Andy Johnstone	928	4.6	−5.0
One Nation	David Dwyer	205	1.0	−0.6
Total formal votes		20,026	96.0	−0.5
Informal votes		834	4.0	+0.5
Turnout		20,860	91.3	−1.4
Two-party-preferred result
Labor	Steph Key	13,230	66.1	+12.4
Liberal	Kevin Kaeding	6,796	33.9	−12.4
Labor hold		Swing	+12.4	

2002 South Australian state election: Ashford
Party	Candidate	Votes	%	±%
Labor	Steph Key	8,425	40.7	+10.2
Liberal	Peter Panagaris	7,682	37.1	+2.5
Democrats	Sue Mann	1,987	9.6	−2.2
Greens	Michelle Drummond	1,111	5.4	+5.4
Family First	James Troup	632	3.0	+3.0
Independent	Paul Vanderkop	559	2.7	+2.7
One Nation	Jos Underhill	326	1.6	+1.6
Total formal votes		20,722	96.5	+0.5
Informal votes		744	3.5	−0.5
Turnout		21,466	92.7	+1.4
Two-party-preferred result
Labor	Steph Key	11,118	53.7	+0.8
Liberal	Peter Panagaris	9,604	46.3	−0.8
Labor hold		Swing	+0.8	
