= 1970 South Australian state election =

← 1968	30 May 1970	1973 →

All 47 seats in the South Australian House of Assembly 24 seats were needed for a majority
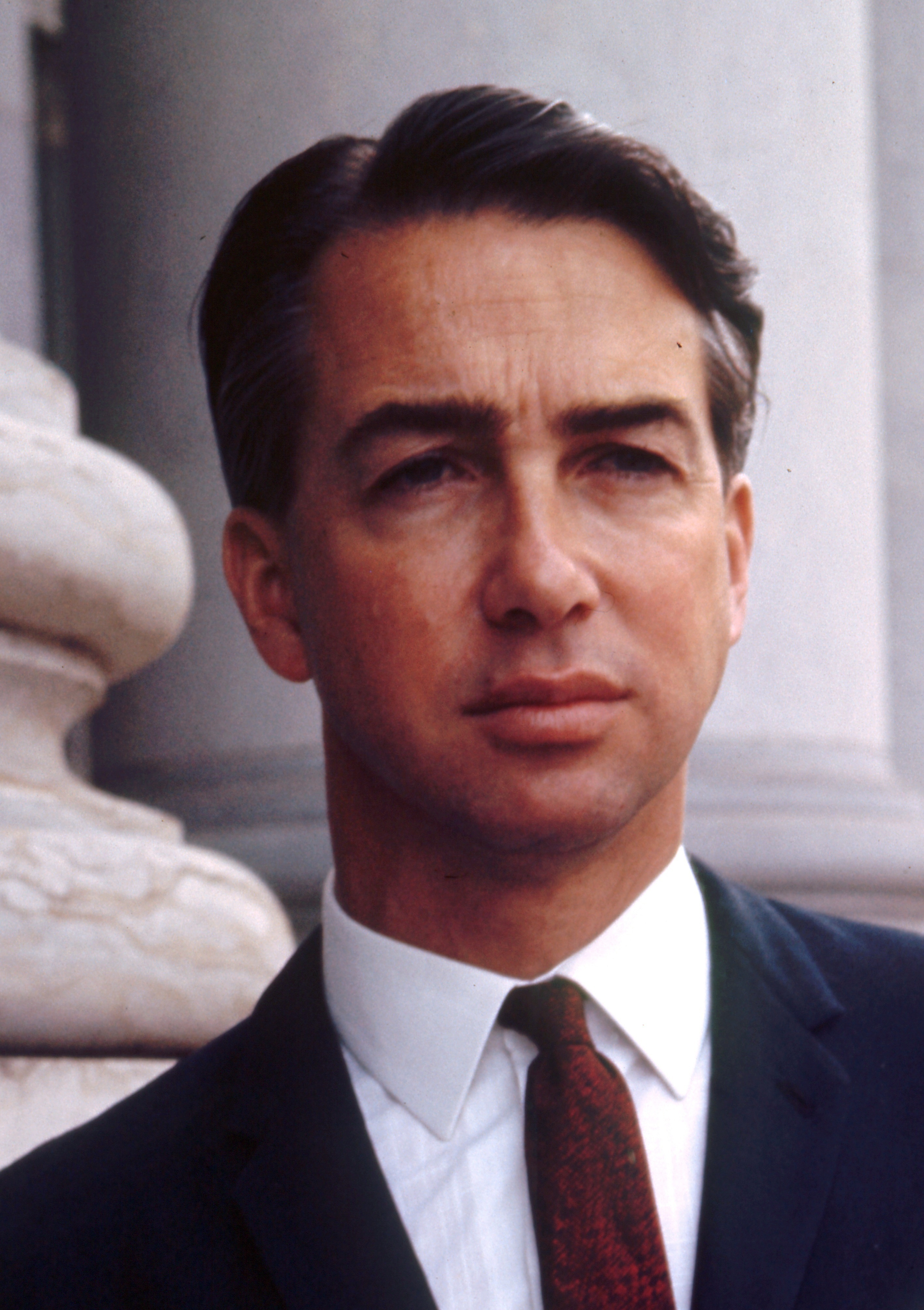

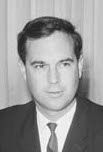
	First party	Second party
Leader	Don Dunstan	Steele Hall
Party	Labor	Liberal and Country League
Leader since	1 June 1967	13 July 1966
Leader's seat	Norwood	Gouger
Last election	19 seats	20 seats
Seats won	27 seats	20 seats
Seat change	▲8	0
Percentage	53.3%	46.7%
Swing	▲0.1	▼0.1
Premier before election
Steele Hall
Liberal and Country League
Elected Premier
Don Dunstan
Labor

State elections were held in South Australia on 30 May 1970. All 47 seats in the South Australian House of Assembly were up for election. The incumbent Liberal and Country League led by Premier of South Australia Steele Hall was defeated by the Australian Labor Party led by Leader of the Opposition Don Dunstan.

== Background ==
The LCL had formed the government of South Australia for 35 of the previous 38 years due to a malapportionment favouring country areas over the Adelaide area. Deliberately inequitable electoral boundaries resulted in a country vote being worth twice a vote in Adelaide, even though Adelaide accounted for two-thirds of the state's population. This system, popularly known as the "Playmander", allowed Thomas Playford to remain Premier of South Australia for 26 years. In the latter part of Playford's tenure, the LCL could only hope to win a few seats in Adelaide. However, the LCL's grip on the country areas was such that it was able to retain power when it lost by substantial margins in terms of raw votes.

A map of South Australian electorates from 1955 to 1969, during the height of the Playmander.

Labor finally overcame the Playmander at the 1965 election under Frank Walsh, but the malapportionment was strong enough that Labor only won 21 seats—just enough for a majority—despite taking 54.3 percent of the two-party vote. At the 1968 election, Labor, now led by Don Dunstan won 53.2 percent of the two-party vote. However, Labor lost two seats to the LCL under Playford's successor, Hall. With the LCL one seat short of a majority, the balance of power rested with long-serving independent Tom Stott, a good friend of former Premier Playford and no friend of Labor. As expected, Stott announced his support for the LCL, thus making Hall the new Premier. If just 21 LCL votes were Labor votes in the seat of Murray, Labor would have formed majority government.

Hall was embarrassed that his party was in a position to win power despite finishing seven points behind Labor on the two-party vote. Concerned by the level of publicity and public protest about the issue, Hall was committed to the principle of a fairer electoral system. He enacted a system that expanded the House of Assembly to 47 seats—28 of which were located in Adelaide, an increase of 15 metropolitan seats, more than double. The reforms fell short of "one vote one value," as Labor had demanded, since country areas were still somewhat over-represented, with the most populous metropolitan seats still containing double the number of voters than the least populous rural seats. However, while there was still rural overweighting, Adelaide now elected a majority of the legislature, making it a near-certainty that Labor would win the next election. Conventional wisdom was that Hall was effectively handing the premiership to Dunstan at the next election.

A 1968 Millicent by-election was triggered by the Court of Disputed Returns where Labor had won the seat by a single vote at the 1968 election. Labor increased their margin. Notably, turnout increased at the by-election.

In early 1970, Hall and Stott fell out over the location of a dam. Stott wanted the dam built in his electorate while Hall thought it more use to locate it elsewhere. Constituent anger forced Stott to vote against the Hall government, leading to an early election and the expected loss to Labor. Stott did not contest the 1970 election.

Hall remained Leader of the Opposition for two years before resigning from the LCL, claiming that the Party had 'lost its idealism [and] forgotten...its purpose for existence'. He founded the Liberal Movement, a progressive Liberal party that included about 200 former LCL members. Hall won a Federal Senate seat for the Liberal Movement in 1974 (and was re-elected in 1975), serving in the Senate for three years before resigning his position. His replacement as the Liberal Movement Senator for South Australia was Janine Haines, who would subsequently become the initial Australian Democrats Senator.

A 1971 Adelaide by-election was triggered as a result of the death of the incumbent MP. Labor easily retained the seat.

== Key dates ==
Date	Event
2 April 1970	Premier Steele Hall declared his government would resign unless Parliament passed legislation ratifying the building of the Dartmouth Dam in Victoria.
30 April 1970	The Hall government lost two votes on amendments to the Dartmouth bill in the House of Assembly.
1 May 1970	The House of Assembly was dissolved.
5 May 1970	Writs were issued by the Governor to proceed with an election.
14 May 1970	Close of nominations.
30 May 1970	Polling day, between the hours of 8am and 6pm.
2 June 1970	The Hall Ministry resigned and the Second Dunstan Ministry was sworn in.
26 June 1970	Return of the writs.
14 July 1970	Parliament resumed for business.

== Results ==
Arrangement of the House of Assembly after the 1970 state election.

South Australian state election, 30 May 1970 House of Assembly << 1968–1973 >>
Enrolled voters	635,533				
Votes cast	603,952		Turnout	95.03%	+0.55%
Informal votes	12,421		Informal	2.06%	–0.25%
Summary of votes by party
Party	Primary votes	%	Swing	Seats	Change
Labor	305,478	51.64%	–0.33%	27	+ 8
Liberal and Country	258,856	43.76%	–0.06%	20	+ 1
National	11,227	1.90%	*	0	± 0
Independent	8,842	1.50%	+0.47%	0	– 1
Democratic Labor	4,211	0.71%	–0.93%	0	± 0
Social Credit	2,401	0.41%	–0.44%	0	± 0
Communist	743	0.13%	–0.16%	0	± 0
Total	591,531			47	
Two-party-preferred
Labor		53.30%	+0.10%		
Liberal and Country		46.70%	–0.10%		

== Post-election pendulum ==
Labor seats (27)
Marginal
Chaffey	Reg Curren	ALP	0.2%
Millicent	Des Corcoran	ALP	4.0%
Brighton	Hugh Hudson	ALP	4.5%
Coles	Len King	ALP	4.9%
Gilles	Jack Slater	ALP	5.4%
Unley	Gil Langley	ALP	5.4%
Fairly safe
Mawson	Don Hopgood	ALP	6.3%
Norwood	Don Dunstan	ALP	7.2%
Henley Beach	Glen Broomhill	ALP	7.9%
Mitchell	Ron Payne	ALP	9.3%
Peake	Don Simmons	ALP	9.3%
Tea Tree Gully	Molly Byrne	ALP	9.4%
Safe
Mount Gambier	Allan Burdon	ALP	10.4%
Playford	Terry McRae	ALP	10.8%
Whyalla	Max Brown	ALP	12.5% v IND
Ascot Park	Geoff Virgo	ALP	13.2%
Elizabeth	John Clark	ALP	16.4%
Adelaide	Sam Lawn	ALP	17.3%
Albert Park	Charles Harrison	ALP	18.0%
Florey	Charles Wells	ALP	18.2%
Price	John Ryan	ALP	18.8%
Salisbury	Reg Groth	ALP	19.3%
Ross Smith	Jack Jennings	ALP	21.3%
Pirie	Dave McKee	ALP	24.6%
Semaphore	Reg Hurst	ALP	24.6%
Spence	Ernie Crimes	ALP	25.7%
Stuart	Gavin Keneally	ALP	26.0%

LCL seats (20)
Marginal
Hanson	Heini Becker	LCL	0.4%
Murray	Ivon Wardle	LCL	2.2%
Frome	Ernest Allen	LCL	4.2%
Light	Bruce Eastick	LCL	4.6%
Fairly safe
Glenelg	John Mathwin	LCL	6.5%
Torrens	John Coumbe	LCL	6.6%
Gouger	Steele Hall	LCL	8.7%
Safe
Fisher	Stan Evans	LCL	11.8%
Mitcham	Robin Millhouse	LCL	15.0%
Flinders	John Carnie	LCL	15.1%
Kavel	Roger Goldsworthy	LCL	15.4% v NAT
Eyre	Graham Gunn	LCL	15.7%
Bragg	David Tonkin	LCL	16.9%
Heysen	William McAnaney	LCL	17.6%
Davenport	Joyce Steele	LCL	18.0%
Goyder	James Ferguson	LCL	19.7%
Rocky River	Howard Venning	LCL	20.3%
Alexandra	David Brookman	LCL	21.0%
Victoria	Allan Rodda	LCL	22.1%
Mallee	Bill Nankivell	LCL	24.2%

== Legislative Council results ==
There was no upper house vote at this election, so the numbers in the Council remained as before.

1968-1973 Legislative Council
Party	Seats
Liberal and Country League	16
Australian Labor Party	4

== See also ==
- Results of the South Australian state election, 1970 (House of Assembly)
- Candidates of the 1970 South Australian state election
- Members of the South Australian House of Assembly, 1970-1973
- Members of the South Australian Legislative Council, 1970-1973
