= Sex Industry Network =

Government of South Australia organisation

Sex Industry Network (SIN) is a peer-based, not for profit organisation, funded by SA Health, a Government of South Australia organisation. Its aim is to maintain low rates of sexually transmitted infections (STIs), blood borne viruses (BBVs) and HIV among sex workers and their clients in South Australia.

SIN provides safer sex supplies such as condoms and lube and delivers outreach to brothels, parlours, private and street-based sex workers.

== History ==
SIN was formed out of the Prostitutes Association of South Australia (PASA), a group formed in 1986 by sex workers.

During this time community groups from priority populations (sex workers, men who have sex with men and injecting drug users) were being funded to deliver HIV prevention information and education within communities as part of Australia's partnership approach to HIV/AIDS. In 1987, PASA received a grant from the SA Health Commission to conduct a three-month HIV/AIDS education project with sex workers called the "Travelling Parlour Show". Several sex workers received training to become "peer educators" and joined with a nurse from the sexually transmitted infections clinic and took their education and information sessions to the workplaces of sex workers across the metropolitan area of Adelaide.

In 1989, PASA and the AIDS council of South Australia (ACSA) joined forces to develop an ongoing HIV/AIDS education project with the sex workers of South Australia. This project has had several name changes including "the PASA project" and "SWIPE" but has been known as the SA Sex Industry Network or SIN since 1994.

SIN was a founding member and continues to be an active member of Scarlet Alliance. In 2013, ACSA became insolvent and SIN was temporarily closed. Scarlet Alliance supported a group of volunteer sex workers in South Australia to keep limited services going while new arrangements were negotiated with the funding bodies. The SA health department agreed to fund Scarlet Alliance to complete ACSA's original contract.

== Political advocacy ==
SIN has supported Labor MP Steph Key's attempts to decriminalise prostitution in South Australia. In 2012, the decriminalisation bill was defeated by one vote. In 2017, an improved bill which had support of sex workers, the working women's centre and unions was introduced into the upper house. The decriminalisation of sex work bill passed the upper house 13 votes to 8. In August 2017, the lower house was set to debate the bill; however, time ran out, resulting in a further delay to progress.

== See also ==
- Prostitution in Australia
