= George Whitten =

Australian politician

George Thomas Whitten (26 June 1922 – 28 June 2001) was an Australian politician who represented the South Australian House of Assembly seat of Price for the Labor Party from 1975 to 1985.

Parliament of South Australia
Preceded by John Ryan	Member for Price; 1975–1985	Succeeded by Murray De Laine
