= Vic Heron =

Australian politician (died 2020)

Victor Stanley Heron (1938/39 – 1 September 2020) was an Australian politician. He was the Labor member for Peake in the South Australian Legislative Assembly from 1989 to 1993.

Parliament of South Australia
Preceded by Keith Plunkett	Member for Peake; 1989–1993	Succeeded by Heini Becker
