= 1974 Goyder state by-election =

The 1974 Goyder state by-election was a by-election held on 8 June 1974 for the South Australian House of Assembly seat of Goyder. This was triggered by the resignation of former premier and Liberal and Country League/Liberal Movement MHA Steele Hall, who resigned to run for the Australian Senate at the 1974 federal election. Created and first contested at the 1970 state election, the seat had been held by the Liberal parties since its creation. Hall won the seat at the 1973 state election as an LCL candidate but afterward changed to the LM.

== Results ==
D D Gardner, who contested the previous election as an independent on 17.6 percent, stood under the LCL banner at the by-election. The Liberal Movement easily retained the seat.

Goyder state by-election, 8 June 1974
Party	Candidate	Votes	%	±%
Liberal Movement	David Boundy	4,399	46.3	+46.3
Liberal and Country	Donald Gardner	2,880	30.3	−21.2
Country	Francis McIntyre	2,230	23.5	−7.4
Total formal votes		9,509	97.6	+2.6
Informal votes		238	2.4	−2.6
Turnout		9,747	92.4	−3.8
Two-candidate-preferred result
Liberal Movement	David Boundy	5,954	62.6	N/A
Liberal and Country	Donald Gardner	3,555	37.4	N/A
Liberal Movement hold		Swing	N/A	

== See also ==
- List of South Australian state by-elections
