= John Meier (politician) =

Australian politician

Eric John Meier (born 14 October 1946) is a former Australian politician who had been the sitting Liberal member for the electoral district of Goyder from 1982 until his retirement in 2006.

The 2006 election saw his successor, Steven Griffiths elected with a reduced margin of 9.1%.

South Australian House of Assembly
Preceded by Keith Russack	Member for Goyder; 1982–2006	Succeeded by Steven Griffiths
