= Rufus Goldney =

Australian politician

Rufus Sanders Goldney (6 August 1883 – 5 August 1966) was an Australian politician who represented the South Australian House of Assembly seat of Gouger from 1944 to 1959 for the Liberal and Country League.

South Australian House of Assembly
Preceded by Horace Bowden	Member for Gouger; 1944–1959	Succeeded by Steele Hall
