= Keith Plunkett =

Australian politician

Keith Henry Plunkett (died 10 June 1994) was an Australian politician who represented the South Australian House of Assembly seat of Peake from 1979 to 1989.

Parliament of South Australia
Preceded by Don Simmons	Member for Peake; 1979–1989	Succeeded by Vic Heron
