= Murray De Laine =

Australian politician (1936–2026)

Murray Royce De Laine (29 August 1936 – 5 October 2026) was an Australian politician. He worked for Holden for 35 years and was a shop steward and executive member of the Association of Draughting, Supervisory and Technical Employees (ADSTE). De Laine represented the electorate of Price as a Labor Party member of the South Australian House of Assembly between 1985 and 2002.

== Life and career ==
De Laine was elected to the seat of Price on 7 December 1985. In 1998 the seat of Price was heavily altered in a redistribution and renamed Cheltenham. In August 2001 De Laine was defeated in a Labor Party pre-selection ballot which saw Jay Weatherill take the pre-selection. On 15 August 2001 De Laine quit the Labor Party and announced he would run as an independent at the next state election. In the 2002 election De Laine stood as an independent and was defeated, with 9.7% of the primary vote. De Laine retired from politics and moved to the Adelaide Hills.

De Laine died on 5 October 2026, at the age of 90.

Parliament of South Australia
| Preceded by George Whitten | Member for Price; 1985–2002 | Seat abolished |
