= Johannes Heinrich Becker =

German Nazi in Australia (1898–1961)

Johannes Heinrich Becker (27 September 1898 – 21 February 1961) was a German immigrant to Australia and member of the German Nazi Party. He immigrated to Australia in 1927. In 1933 he was appointed as the Nazi state trustee for Australia. He was later the state leader of the Nazi Party of Australia, but was removed as state leader in 1936. During World War II, Becker was interned by the Australian authorities and after the war, in 1947, he was deported to West Germany, where he lived until his death in 1961.

== Early life ==
Becker was born on 27 September 1898 in Schmalkalden, Thuringia, Germany, the son of art teacher Heinrich Thomas Becker and his wife Frieda Johanne Luise (née Hornäffer). In World War I, Becker enlisted in the Imperial German Army, with tours in Verdun, France, and Ypres, Belgium. Eventually earning the rank of corporal, he was wounded on a couple of occasions and presented with the Iron Cross. Becker later attended the University of Marburg, graduating in 1924 with a degree in medicine. He worked on board a ship as a doctor for a year before emigrating to South Australia in 1927.

== Career ==
Becker worked as a doctor at Tanunda, Barossa Valley but unsuccessfully applied to be a naturalised citizen in 1930. While not officially registered as a doctor in Australia, Becker continued to practise till 1939, earning the ire of the local British Medical Association authorities. Becker emerged victorious in two libel cases against the association and was supported by both his patients and Sir Richard Layton Butler. From 1933 to 1934, Becker made a few trips to Germany.

On 1 March 1932, Becker became a member of the German Nazi Party. A year later, he was appointed as the Nazi state trustee (Landesvertrauensmann) for Australia. Becker was eventually promoted to state leader (Landeskreisleiter) of the Nazi Party of Australia. However, his leadership approach did not impress the Nazi top brass in Berlin and he was removed from his post in late 1936. During World War II, Becker was interned in Tatura, Victoria and in Loveday, South Australia. In December 1947, he was deported to occupied Germany and cleared of any wrongdoing by a "denazification" tribunal. Nonetheless, his numerous requests to return to Australia were rejected, and his marriage was annulled by the South Australian Supreme Court in 1953.

== Personal life and death ==
Becker married Mona Gertrude Price on 22 August 1932 at the Adelaide-based St Stephan's Lutheran Church; they had a son and a daughter. Becker's son, Heini (born 1935), served as a member of the South Australian Parliament from 1970 until 1997. Johannes Becker spent his final years in West Germany and died on 21 February 1961 in Bremen.
