= Steven Griffiths =

Australian politician

The Honourable Steven Griffiths MP
- Griffiths, circa 2009

Deputy Leader of the South Australian Liberal Party
- In office 8 July 2009 – 30 March 2010
- Leader: Isobel Redmond
- Preceded by: Isobel Redmond
- Succeeded by: Martin Hamilton-Smith

Member of the South Australian Parliament for Goyder
- In office 18 March 2006 – 17 March 2018
- Preceded by: John Meier
- Succeeded by: District abolished

Personal details
- Born: Steven Paul Griffiths; 25 May 1962 (age 63) Adelaide, South Australia
- Party: Liberal Party of Australia (SA)
- Spouse: Donna-Marie McEvoy
- Profession: Local Council CEO

Steven Paul Griffiths (born 25 May 1962) is a former Australian politician. He was a member of the South Australian House of Assembly from 2006 to 2018, representing the electorate of Goyder for the Liberal Party. He was the Deputy leader of the opposition under Isobel Redmond from 2009 to 2010.

== Biography ==
Griffiths was elected to the safe Liberal seat of Goyder at the 2006 state election to replace retiring sitting member John Meier. Griffiths was elected with a margin of 9.1 points, suffering a 7.1-point swing. Griffiths has held shadow ministries since 2007, and in 2009 was elected to the deputy leadership of his party with Isobel Redmond being elected to the leadership.

On Tuesday 30 March 2010, Griffiths was replaced by former leader Martin Hamilton-Smith as deputy.

Griffiths announced on 14 February 2017 that he would be retiring from parliament as of the 2018 election.

Political offices
Preceded by Isobel Redmond	Deputy Leader of the Opposition in South Australia; 2009–2010	Succeeded by Martin Hamilton-Smith
Parliament of South Australia
Preceded by John Meier	Member for Goyder; 2006–2018	District abolished
