= Horace Bowden =

Australian politician (1880–1958)

Horace Elliott Bowden (5 November 1880 – 23 August 1958) was an Australian politician who represented the South Australian House of Assembly seat of Gouger from 1943 to 1944 for the Labor Party.

South Australian House of Assembly
Preceded by Albert Robinson	Member for Gouger; 1943–1944	Succeeded by Rufus Goldney
