= Stewart Leggett =

Australian politician

Stewart Ronald Leggett

Member of the South Australian Parliament for Hanson
- In office 11 December 1993 – 11 October 1997
- Preceded by: Heini Becker
- Succeeded by: Steph Key

Personal details
- Born: 18 December 1944 (age 81) Bordertown, South Australia
- Party: Liberal
- Spouse: Marion Leggett (m. 1964; died 2019)
- Children: 1 daughter 1 son (died 2016)

Stewart Ronald Leggett (born 18 December 1944) is an Australian religious minister and former politician and educator. He was a Liberal member of the South Australian House of Assembly from 1993 to 1997, representing the seat of Hanson in the 37th Parliament of South Australia. He was deputy headmaster and pastor of Temple Christian College before entering parliament.

After not being reelected in the 1997 election, Leggett then served as a senior political advisor to the Premier and Deputy Premier of South Australia. From 1999 he was the head of the Aldinga campus of Southern Vales Christian College, until his retirement from teaching by 2005.

== Early years and personal life ==
Stewart Leggett was born to Colin Stewart Leggett (a furniture salesman) and Lylia Mavis Carson in Bordertown, South Australia, on 18 December 1944.

Leggett attended Bordertown High School, but missed a year of school following a car accident. He then left school early at the end of his year 10. He later moved to Adelaide and completed his year 11 and 12 at night school while working in a retail menswear store, after which he became a teacher.

Leggett's first child, Sarah Porter, was born in the 1960s followed by the birth of his second child, Paul Leggett, on 22 January 1968. Both of his children went on to become accomplished classical musicians. Sarah Porter performs cello in the Geelong Symphony Orchestra and is a recorded cellist for the 1999 Sons of Korah album Light of Life. Career highlights for Paul Leggett included performing in the opening and closing ceremonies of the 2006 Commonwealth Games and playing in many Australian orchestras, including touring China with the Royal Melbourne Philharmonic and playing principal viola for the Melbourne Opera. Paul later moved to Alice Springs to teach music to remote students. Paul died in December 2016, drowning at a popular Alice Springs swimming hole while leading a local school excursion.

== Career before politics ==
Leggett worked as a master at Pulteney Grammar School and from 1973 until 1984 he was the Director of Drama at Pulteney Grammar. He then became a staff member at Temple Christian College soon after the school first opened in 1983. Leggett was the Deputy Headmaster of Temple Christian College from 1986 until 1993 and become the school's Acting Headmaster in 1992.

Leggett obtained his Licentiate in Theology in Melbourne in 1970 through the Australian College of Theology. He subsequently obtained his Bachelor of Ministry majoring in pastoral care.

From 1989 until 1992 Leggett was the pastor of the Lockleys Baptist Church. From 1991 until 1993 he was a minister for United Christian Fellowship. From 1993 until 1994 he became an associate pastor of the Sonshine Fellowship Church.

== Political life ==
Leggett twice ran for parliament, unsuccessfully, as a Liberal Movement candidate in the 1970s. He was the fourth candidate on the Liberal Movement Senate ticket in South Australia at the 1974 federal election; and was a candidate in the seat of Hawker at the 1975 federal election, receiving 6.6 percent primary vote.

He was a Liberal member of the South Australian House of Assembly from 1993 to 1997, representing the seat of Hanson. His parliamentary appointment was to the recently created Social Development Committee where he worked with Michael Atkinson and other appointed members of parliament on an inquiry into prostitution. He also served on the Family and Community Services Committee and Tourism Committee. Leggett was a member of a 1995 Estimates Committee for the state government's $267 million South Australia Police budget.

Leggett supported upholding the ban of the controversial film Salò, or the 120 Days of Sodom. Leggett's support of the ban in parliament was quoted by Censorship in Australia:

A minority group in our society declares that we should be able to read and see whatever we like. I suggest that not one of us is free to do as we like. As a family community—a fact from which there is no escape—we are responsible to one another. The old saying ‘to treat others as we would like to be treated ourselves’ should be our goal in life and the basis of our legislation in Parliament. For this reason I would offer my congratulations and support to the Attorney-General for his stand in banning the film Salo.

— Stewart Leggett (15 February 1994)

Leggett was not reelected in the 1997 election, losing the seat of Hanson to Steph Key.

After leaving parliament Leggett then served as a senior political advisor to the Premier and Deputy Premier of South Australia.

Leggett was a powerbroker, preference negotiator and adviser in the early years of the Family First Party, including when it won its first seat at the 2002 South Australian state election.

== Life after politics ==
Leggett worked with SAPOL for many years delivering drivers’ safety programs in schools.

From 1999 Leggett was the headmaster of the Aldinga campus of Southern Vales Christian College until his retirement from teaching in 2005.

In 1999 Leggett took up the position of Assistant Pastor of the Teen Challenge Church. In 2014 Stewart Leggett was a pastor at the Victor Harbor Church of Christ. Leggett currently sermons at Trinity South Coast, the Victor Harbor branch of Holy Trinity Church, Adelaide.

As well as leading a number of churches in Adelaide, Leggett was employed as a pastor at Temple Christian College and also as chaplain of the Norwood Football Club. In 2006 Leggett performed the funeral ceremony of the director of Teen Challenge in South Australia, Pastor Morrie Thompson.

In 2003, 2006, 2009, and 2012 Leggett was appointed as a member of South Australia's Legal Practitioners Conduct Board, positions he was nominated for by the Attorney General and Premier of South Australia. In 2013 Leggett was also appointed as a Justice of the Peace, the position nominated by Premier Jay Weatherill.

Leggett ran for mayor of Victor Harbor in the 2010 council elections and was the second most popular candidate by first preference votes, but lost to Graham Philip by 108 votes.

Leggett remained active in many community sporting organisations following his retirement. As of 2012, Leggett was on the board of the Rotary Club of Encounter Bay, working with children as the club's Director of New Generations. As of 2015, he presented a radio show on 90.1 HappyFM in Victor Harbor, which included conducting interviews with local figures in the Victor Harbor community.

Parliament of South Australia
Preceded by Heini Becker	Member for Hanson; 1993–1997	Succeeded by Steph Key
