= David Boundy =

Australian politician

Leslie David Boundy (12 August 1932 – 18 July 2003) was an Australian politician who represented the South Australian House of Assembly seat of Goyder from 1974 to 1977 for the Liberal Movement and Liberal Party.

== See also ==
- 1974 Goyder state by-election

South Australian House of Assembly
Preceded by Steele Hall	Member for Goyder; 1974–1977	Succeeded by Keith Russack
