= Steph Key =

Australian politician

The Honourable Steph Key JP
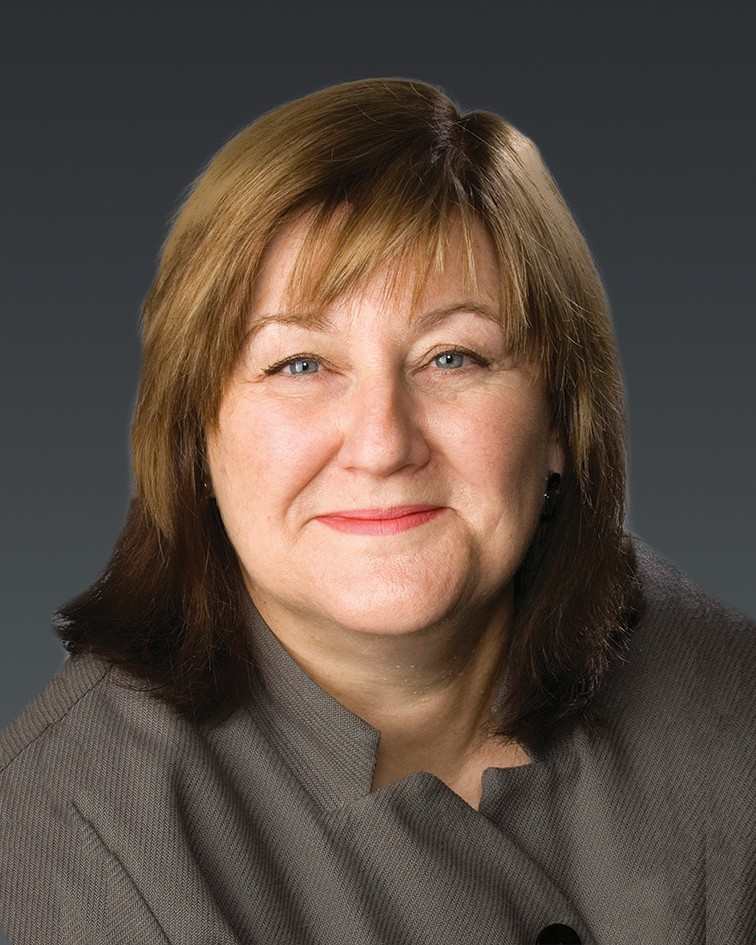

Minister for Social Justice
- In office 6 March 2002 – 5 March 2004
- Succeeded by: Jay Weatherill

Minister for Housing
- In office 6 March 2002 – 5 March 2004
- Preceded by: Dean Brown
- Succeeded by: Jay Weatherill

Minister for Employment, Training and Further Education
- In office 5 March 2004 – 23 March 2006
- Preceded by: Jane Lomax-Smith
- Succeeded by: Paul Caica

Minister for Youth
- In office 6 March 2002 – 23 March 2006
- Preceded by: Mark Brindal
- Succeeded by: Paul Caica

Minister for the Status of Women
- In office 2 March 2002 – 23 March 2006
- Preceded by: Diana Laidlaw
- Succeeded by: Gail Gago

Member of the South Australian Parliament for Ashford
- In office 9 February 2002 – 17 March 2018
- Preceded by: District created
- Succeeded by: District abolished

Member of the South Australian Parliament for Hanson
- In office 11 October 1997 – 9 February 2002
- Preceded by: Stewart Leggett
- Succeeded by: District abolished

Personal details
- Born: 13 December 1954 (age 71) Woodville, South Australia, Australia
- Party: Australian Labor Party (SA)
- Spouse: Dr Kevin Purse
- Education: Flinders University (BA)
- Profession: Trade Unionist, Advocate, Politician
- Website: SA Parliament Biography

Stephanie Wendy Key (born 13 December 1954) is a former Australian politician who was a member of the South Australian House of Assembly for the Australian Labor Party from the 1997 election until her retirement in 2018, representing the electorates of Hanson (1997–2002) and Ashford (2002–2018).

== Early life ==
Born at the Queen Elizabeth Hospital in Adelaide's western suburbs, Key attended the Largs Bay Primary, Port Adelaide Girls Technical, and Marryatville Adult Matriculation High School (where she was among the second group of adults in South Australia to matriculate) before completing a Bachelor of Arts majoring in politics and sociology at Flinders University, where she was elected as the first female general secretary of the Flinders University Students Association. In 1989, Key married fellow Trade Unionist Kevin Purse in Adelaide.

Before entering parliament, Key worked as a waitress, cook, cleaner and clerk, as well as a number of positions within the Transport Workers Union, the Australian Council of Trades Unions (ACTU) and the United Trades and Labor Council of South Australia (UTLC).

Key also served as the director of the Working Women's Centre and as a member of the South Australian Housing Trust's board of directors.

== Parliament ==
Key was elected as member for the electoral district of Hanson at the 1997 election, and immediately assumed shadow ministerial responsibilities for industrial affairs, youth affairs and assisting in multicultural and ethnic affairs. Changes in the shadow cabinet during 2000 saw her responsibilities change to housing and urban development, employment and training, local government and youth affairs.

The 2002 election saw the seat of Hanson abolished and Key was re-elected to parliament as member for Ashford. With the election of the Rann government in 2002, Key became Australia's first Minister for Social Justice, with further portfolio responsibilities for community and disability services, ageing, housing, youth and the status of women. Key attempted to decriminalize prostitution in South Australia, with the support of SIN.

Key oversaw a comprehensive overhaul of South Australia's child protection laws and strategies to improve and sharpen the way in which Government responds to the needs and welfare of children in care. During Key's term as Social Justice Minister, South Australian also saw the redrafting of anti-discrimination legislation and the Equal Opportunity Act.

Following a mid-term cabinet reshuffle in 2004, Key became the Minister for Employment, Training and Further Education while also retaining the youth and status of women portfolios.

During her time in parliament, Key pushed for progressive legislation. She belonged to the Labor Left faction.

Though her seat of Ashford was renamed to Badcoe along with a significant increase to the Labor margin in the seat following the electoral redistribution, Key announced on 3 February 2017 that she would be retiring from parliament as of the 2018 election.

== Electoral results ==
Key defeated Liberal Stewart Leggett in the seat of Hanson at the 1997 election with a 55.6 percent two-party vote. Hanson was abolished before the 2002 election and was replaced by Ashford which Key retained with an increased 53.7 percent two-party vote from a 0.8-point swing. Key increased her two-party vote to 66.1 percent, a two-party swing of 12.4 points, at the 2006 election. Key retained her seat at the 2010 election with a 54.8 percent two-party vote, despite suffering a 10.4-point swing. Key's two-party vote was reduced to 50.6 percent in a redistribution however she retained the seat at the 2014 election with an increased 51.9 percent two-party vote from a 1.3-point swing.

== Personal Causes and Interests ==
Key was a founding member of The Muriel Matters Society.

South Australian House of Assembly
Preceded by Stewart Leggett	Member for Hanson; 1997–2002	District abolished
New seat	Member for Ashford; 2002–2018	District abolished
