= Keith Russack =

Australian politician

Edwin Keith Russack OAM (2 April 1918 – 26 February 1999) known as Keith Russack, was a politician in the State of South Australia.

== History ==
Russack was born at Kadina, South Australia, the youngest son of Alfred Hermann Russack (1879 – 5 November 1951) and his wife Rosa A. Russack, née Symons (1866–1955), who married in 1907. A. H. Russack was a jeweller who served his apprenticeship with J. M. Wendt, and Keith trained as a watchmaker and was employed at his father's business in Kadina. He enlisted with the 2nd AIF early in 1940 and saw action in South-east Asia. He maintained his involvement with the military, and in 1952 was Captain of C Company 27th Infantry Battalion (South Australian Scottish Regiment).

By 1953 he had two jewellery and gift stores in Kadina.

He was in September 1970 elected as a Liberal candidate for a Midland district seat in the Legislative Council made vacant by the death of Colin Rowe. In 1973 he won the seat of Gouger in the House of Assembly, succeeding Steele Hall. At the 1977 elections the seat of Gouger had been abolished, and Russack was not preselected for any seat, so stood as an Independent Liberal for Goyder, which he won, and subsequently rejoined the Liberal Party, holding the seat until 1982, when he retired, to be succeeded by John Meier.

== Other activities ==
He was Mayor of the Corporate Town of Kadina (as also was Liberal Premier John Olsen) from 1968 to 1971, a charter member of Kadina Rotary Club from 1959, and director of the first Kernewek Lowender Festival. He was awarded an OAM in 1989.

== Family ==
He married Ruth Boaden Trenwith (21 November 1920 – 27 August 2000) of Kadina in February 1943. They had three sons: Rodger, Lee and Mark.

South Australian Legislative Council
| Preceded by Colin Rowe | Member for Midland District; 1970–1973 | Succeeded by Brian Chatterton |
South Australian House of Assembly
| Preceded by Steele Hall | Member for Gouger; 1973–1977 | District abolished |
| Preceded by David Boundy | Member for Goyder; 1977–1982 | Succeeded by John Meier |
