= Jack Olson (Australian politician) =

Australian politician

John William Olson (10 October 1916 – 13 November 2008) was an Australian politician who represented the South Australian House of Assembly seat of Semaphore for the Labor Party from 1973 to 1979.

== See also ==
- 1973 Semaphore state by-election
