= Electoral district of Hanson =

Former South Australian state electoral district

Hanson South Australia—House of Assembly
- State: South Australia
- Created: 1970
- Abolished: 2002
- Namesake: Richard Hanson
- Demographic: Metropolitan

Hanson was an electoral district of the House of Assembly in the Australian state of South Australia from 1970 to 2002. The district was based in the western suburbs of Adelaide.

First won at the 1970 election by the Liberal and Country League on a two-party margin of just 0.4 percent, it bounced between a marginal to safe Liberal seat, held by Heini Becker, until it was transformed into a marginal Labor seat by the redistribution ahead of the 1993 election, but was retained by Liberal Stewart Leggett before being won by Labor for the first time at the 1997 election as a marginal Labor seat represented by Steph Key. Hanson was abolished and renamed to Ashford ahead of the 2002 election which Labor and Key have retained since.

== Members for Hanson ==
Member	Party	Term
Heini Becker	Liberal and Country	1970–1974
Heini Becker	Liberal	1974–1993
Stewart Leggett	Liberal	1993–1997
Steph Key	Labor	1997–2002
