= Electoral district of Gouger =

Former South Australian state electoral district

Coordinates: 34°08′51″S 138°24′57″E

Gouger South Australia—House of Assembly
- State: South Australia
- Created: 1938
- Abolished: 1977
- Demographic: Rural

Gouger was an electoral district of the House of Assembly in the Australian state of South Australia from 1938 to 1977 and which was associated with the town of Balaklava.

Gouger was abolished in a boundary redistribution in 1977.

== Members ==
Member	Party	Term
Albert Robinson	Independent	1938–1943
Horace Bowden	Labor	1943–1944
Rufus Goldney	Liberal and Country	1944–1959
Steele Hall	Liberal and Country	1959–1973
Keith Russack	Liberal and Country	1973–1974
Keith Russack	Liberal	1974–1977

Russack went to represent the Electoral district of Goyder from September 1977.
