= James Ferguson (Australian politician) =

Australian politician

James Rankin Ferguson (3 January 1908 – 20 November 1975) was an Australian politician who represented the South Australian House of Assembly seats of Goyder from 1970 to 1973 and Yorke Peninsula from 1963 to 1970 for the Liberal and Country League.

South Australian House of Assembly
Preceded by Cecil Hincks	Member for Yorke Peninsula; 1963–1970	Seat abolished
New seat	Member for Goyder; 1970–1973	Succeeded by Steele Hall
