= Reg Hurst =

Australian politician

Reginald Edwin Hurst (6 June 1917 – 31 March 1973) was an Australian politician who represented the South Australian House of Assembly seat of Semaphore for the Labor Party from 1964 to 1973. He was Speaker of the South Australian House of Assembly for the Don Dunstan Labor government from 1970 to 1973.

Parliament of South Australia
Preceded by Harold Tapping	Member for Semaphore; 1964–1973	Succeeded by Jack Olson
Preceded by Tom Stott	Speaker of the South Australian House of Assembly; 1970–1973	Succeeded by John Ryan
