= Electoral district of Peake =

Former South Australian electoral district

Peake South Australia—House of Assembly
- State: South Australia
- Created: 1970
- Abolished: 2002
- Namesake: Archibald Peake
- Demographic: Metropolitan

Peake was an electoral district of the House of Assembly in the Australian state of South Australia from 1970 to 2002. The district was based in the western suburbs of Adelaide.

Typically a Labor seat, it was lost to the Liberal Party at the landslide 1993 state election. Peake was superseded by West Torrens at the 2002 state election.

== Members for Peake ==
Member	Party	Term
Don Simmons	Labor	1970–1979
Keith Plunkett	Labor	1979–1989
Vic Heron	Labor	1989–1993
Heini Becker	Liberal	1993–1997
Tom Koutsantonis	Labor	1997–2002
