= Steele Hall =

Australian politician (1928–2024)

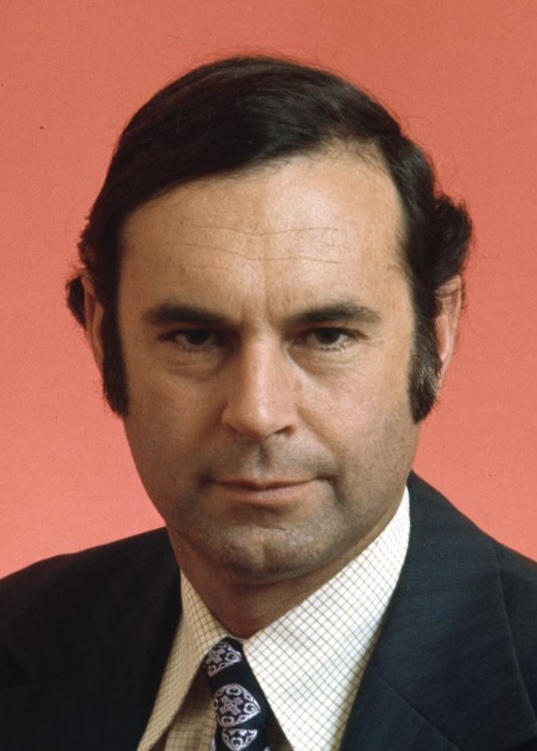
- Official portrait, 1974

36th Premier of South Australia
- In office 17 April 1968 – 2 June 1970
- Monarch: Elizabeth II
- Governor: Sir Edric Bastyan; Sir James Harrison
- Preceded by: Don Dunstan
- Succeeded by: Don Dunstan

Member of the Australian Parliament for Boothby
- In office 21 February 1981 – 29 January 1996
- Preceded by: John McLeay Jr.
- Succeeded by: Andrew Southcott

Senator for South Australia
- In office 18 May 1974 – 16 November 1977
- Preceded by: Nancy Buttfield
- Succeeded by: Janine Haines

Treasurer of South Australia
- In office 2 March 1970 – 2 June 1970
- Premier: Himself
- Preceded by: Glen Pearson
- Succeeded by: Don Dunstan

Leader of the Opposition in South Australia
- In office 2 June 1970 – 15 March 1972
- Deputy: Glen Pearson; Robin Millhouse
- Preceded by: Don Dunstan
- Succeeded by: Bruce Eastick
- In office 13 July 1966 – 17 April 1968
- Preceded by: Sir Thomas Playford IV
- Succeeded by: Don Dunstan

Leader of the Liberal and Country League
- In office 13 July 1966 – 15 March 1972
- Preceded by: Sir Thomas Playford IV
- Succeeded by: Bruce Eastick

Member of the South Australian Parliament for Goyder
- In office 10 March 1973 – 8 June 1974
- Preceded by: James Ferguson
- Succeeded by: David Boundy

Member of the South Australian Parliament for Gouger
- In office 7 March 1959 – 10 March 1973
- Preceded by: Rufus Goldney
- Succeeded by: Keith Russack

Personal details
- Born: Raymond Steele Hall; 30 November 1928 Balaklava, South Australia, Australia
- Died: 10 June 2024 (aged 95)
- Party: Liberal and Country League (1959–1973); Liberal Movement (1973–1976); Liberal Party of Australia (1976–1996)
- Spouses: Anne Fletcher (m. 1956; div. 1978) Joan Bullock (m. 1978)

Raymond Steele Hall (30 November 1928 – 10 June 2024) was an Australian politician who served as the 36th Premier of South Australia from 1968 to 1970. He also served in the federal Parliament as a senator for South Australia from 1974 to 1977 and federal member for the Division of Boothby from 1981 to 1996.

Hall was a state parliamentarian from 1959 to 1974 and served as Liberal and Country League leader from 1966 to 1972 and Premier from 1968 to 1970. He introduced electoral reform, removing the Playmander which favoured the Liberal and Country League, which contributed to his party's loss at the 1970 South Australian state election. In 1972 he founded the Liberal Movement, and resigned from the Liberal and Country League when the Liberal Movement split from the Liberal and Country League in 1973. He continued as a state parliamentarian until he resigned his seat in 1974 to be the Liberal Movement's lead Senate candidate at the 1974 Australian federal election.

Hall won a Senate seat for the Liberal Movement at both the 1974 and 1975 elections. After the Liberal Movement disbanded in 1976 he rejoined the Liberal Party, as it was now called in South Australia, and he resigned from the senate in 1977 to contest the seat of Hawker at the 1977 election, but was unsuccessful. In 1981 he won the seat of Boothby at the 1981 by-election, and remained the Liberal member for Boothby until his retirement in 1996.

== Early life ==
Hall was born on 30 November 1928 in Balaklava, South Australia, the son of Florence (née Fisher) and Sidney Hall. He attended primary school in Owen and subsequently graduated from Balaklava High School. After leaving school he worked on the family property in Owen, an 800-acre (320 ha) sheep and wheat farm.

== Political career ==
=== State politics ===
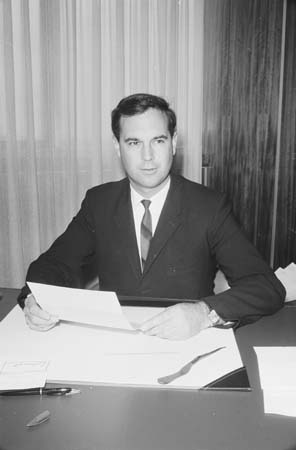
Hall in 1968

Hall was elected to the South Australian House of Assembly as the Liberal and Country League member for Gouger, based on Balaklava, at the 1959 election. Quickly gaining a reputation for his independence and strength of his views, Hall rose through the Liberal and Country League parliamentary ranks to assume party leadership following Premier Thomas Playford's retirement in July 1966. Playford, who had earlier served as Premier for 26 years, endorsed Hall as his successor. Although Hall was considerably more progressive than Playford, the two men shared a background as small farmers, rather than members of the rural elite or the Adelaide Establishment. Playford realised that the LCL needed a new image and new leader to broaden its appeal.

Hall served as Leader of the Opposition for two years before leading the Liberal and Country League into the 1968 election. Considered young and handsome, he was also the first Australian state premier to sport sideburns. Indeed, the 1968 election, fought between Hall and his Labor opponent Don Dunstan, was described by the Democratic Labor Party as the battle of "the matinee idols". The election resulted in a hung parliament, with Labor and the Liberal and Country League winning 19 seats each. Liberal and Country League-leaning independent Tom Stott announced his support for the Liberal and Country League. Dunstan and Labor were defeated in the legislature on 17 April, and Hall was sworn in as Premier later that day.

Hall immediately set out to deal with the issue of electoral reform. Deliberately inequitable electoral boundaries, commonly known as the Playmander, had greatly advantaged the Liberal and Country League over the past 40 years. Since 1932, the House of Assembly had 39 members—13 from the Adelaide area and 26 from country areas. However, by the 1960s, even though Adelaide accounted for two-thirds of the state's population, a vote in Adelaide was effectively worth only half a country vote. Hall was highly embarrassed that the Liberal and Country League had been in a position to win government despite winning 43.8% of the first preference vote compared to Labor's 52%. He was also concerned by the level of publicity and growing public protest about the issue. This made him all the more committed to the principle of a fairer electoral system.

Hall sponsored an electoral reform Bill which expanded the House of Assembly to 47 seats, including 28 in the Adelaide area. It fell short of "one vote one value," as Dunstan and Labor had demanded, since rural areas were still overrepresented. As mentioned above, Adelaide now contained two-thirds of the state's population. Nevertheless, it was a much fairer system than its predecessor. Hall undertook this knowing that it would considerably strengthen Labor's hand. Even at the height of the Liberal and Country League's popularity under Playford, Labor had dominated Adelaide, with the Liberal and Country League only able to win a few seats in the "eastern crescent" and around Holdfast Bay. With Adelaide now electing a majority of the legislature, conventional wisdom held that Hall pushed for electoral reform knowing that he was effectively handing the premiership to Dunstan at the next election.

In addition to electoral reform, Hall also introduced improvements in social welfare, Aboriginal affairs and abortion regulation. Hall also began the distribution of fluoridated water in South Australia in 1968.

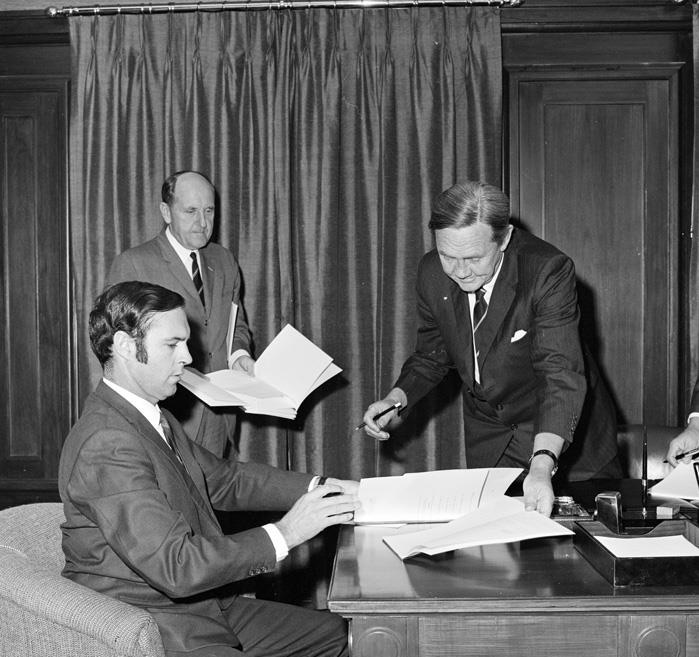
Hall with Prime Minister John Gorton in 1970.

Hall served as his own Treasurer for two months in 1970. Hall and Stott soon fell out over the location of a dam. Stott wanted the dam built at Chowilla in his electorate while Hall thought it more use to locate it elsewhere. Constituent anger forced Stott to vote against the Hall government, forcing an election in June 1970. As expected, Labor regained power, taking 27 seats to the Liberal and Country League's 20. As a measure of how distorted the Playmander had been, Labor won easily despite picking up a swing of only 0.1 percent.

Hall remained Leader of the Opposition for two years before resigning from the Liberal and Country League on 15 March 1972, claiming that the party had 'lost its idealism [and] forgotten...its purpose for existence'. He founded the Liberal Movement, a progressive liberal party that initially included about 200 former Liberal and Country League members. Hall and his fellow Liberal Movement members helped the Dunstan Government introduce adult suffrage and proportional representation for Legislative Council of South Australia elections.

After much of his base was transferred to the Yorke Peninsula-based seat of Goyder before the 1973 state election, Hall ran as the Liberal Movement candidate there and won.

=== Federal politics ===
Hall won a federal Senate seat for the Liberal Movement at the double dissolution 1974 election, after resigning his state seat, which sparked a by-election in his former seat of Goyder. At the Joint Sitting of Parliament, Hall supported the Labor government's three electoral reform Bills, citing his experience as South Australian Premier. During the 1975 Australian constitutional crisis, though opposed to the Whitlam government, Hall joined Labor (and independent Cleaver Bunton) in voting against the deferral of supply bills.

Hall was re-elected at the 1975 election. He became a member of the Liberal Party in June 1976 after the Liberal Movement reintegrated into the Liberal and Country League which was renamed to match with its interstate counterparts. He resigned from the Senate on 16 November 1977 to unsuccessfully contest the seat of Hawker in the House of Representatives. Premier Dunstan appointed Janine Haines of the Australian Democrats to replace him.

After four years out of politics, Hall won the 1981 Boothby by-election as the Liberal Party's candidate.

In August 1988, after the then opposition leader John Howard expressed his wish to control Asian immigration in Australia, Steele Hall (along with Ian Macphee and Philip Ruddock) dissented by crossing the floor of parliament and voting with the Labor government on a motion against the use of race as a criterion for selecting immigrants.

Steele Hall addressed the Parliament, saying:

"The question has quickly descended from a discussion about the future migrant intake to one about the level of internal racial tolerance. The simple fact is that public opinion is easily led on racial issues. It is now time to unite the community on the race issue before it flares into an ugly reproach for us all."

Hall held Boothby until his retirement at the 1996 election. He had been instrumental in blocking Liberal Senate leader Robert Hill to succeed him in the Liberal preselection contest for Boothby. The preselection went instead to Andrew Southcott, who succeeded Hall in the seat in 1996.

Unusually for a former state premier, Hall spent most of his time as a federal Liberal MP on the backbench. His long-standing antagonism to Malcolm Fraser kept him out of cabinet during the last term of the Fraser government. In Opposition, Liberal leader Andrew Peacock appointed him to the frontbench as Shadow Special Minister of State in 1983.

However, he returned to the backbench in 1984, where he remained for the remainder of his parliamentary career including when fellow South Australian Alexander Downer became leader in 1994. Hall had defeated Downer for Liberal preselection for the 1981 Boothby by-election.

== Personal life and death ==
Hall married schoolteacher Anne Fletcher in 1956, with whom he had one son and three daughters. They were divorced in 1978, and later that year he married his research assistant Joan Bullock. The couple had one son and one daughter together. Joan was elected to the South Australian parliament in 1993.

Hall died on 10 June 2024, at the age of 95.

Political offices
Preceded by Thomas Playford IV	Leader of the Opposition of South Australia; 1966–1968	Succeeded by Don Dunstan
Preceded by Don Dunstan	Premier of South Australia; 1968–1970	Succeeded by Don Dunstan
Preceded by Glen Pearson	Treasurer of South Australia; 1970	Succeeded by Don Dunstan
Preceded by Don Dunstan	Leader of the Opposition of South Australia; 1970–1972	Succeeded by Bruce Eastick
Parliament of South Australia
Preceded by Rufus Goldney	Member for Gouger; 1959–1973	Succeeded by Keith Russack
Preceded by James Ferguson	Member for Goyder; 1973–1974	Succeeded by David Boundy
Parliament of Australia
Preceded by John McLeay Jr.	Member for Boothby; 1981–1996	Succeeded by Andrew Southcott
Preceded by Nancy Buttfield	Senator for South Australia; 1974–1977	Succeeded by Janine Haines
Party political offices
Preceded by Thomas Playford IV	Leader of the Liberal and Country League (SA); 1966–1972	Succeeded by Bruce Eastick
