= Electoral district of Price =

Former state electoral district in South Australia

Price South Australia—House of Assembly
- State: South Australia
- Created: 1970
- Abolished: 2002
- Namesake: Thomas Price
- Demographic: Metropolitan

Price was an electoral district of the House of Assembly in the Australian state of South Australia from 1970 to 2002. Based in the north-west of Adelaide, it was a safe Labor seat.

Price was left as the only safe Labor seat at the 1993 election landslide.

The district was renamed Cheltenham at the 2002 election.

== Members for Price ==
Member	Party	Term
John Ryan	Labor	1970–1975
George Whitten	Labor	1975–1985
Murray De Laine	Labor	1985–2002
