= John Ryan (South Australian politician) =

Australian politician

John Richard Ryan (24 April 1911 – 12 September 1988) was an Australian politician who represented the South Australian House of Assembly seats of Port Adelaide from 1959 to 1970 and Price from 1970 to 1975 for the Labor Party. He served as Speaker of the South Australian House of Assembly for the Don Dunstan Labor government from 1973 to 1975. Prior to parliament he was a waterside worker and a Licensed Customs and Shipping Agent.

Parliament of South Australia
Preceded by James Stephens	Member for Port Adelaide; 1959–1970	District abolished
New district	Member for Price; 1970–1975	Succeeded by George Whitten
Preceded by Reg Hurst	Speaker of the South Australian House of Assembly; 1973–1975	Succeeded by Ted Connelly
