= Don Simmons (politician) =

Australian politician

Donald William Simmons AM (14 February 1918 – 28 August 1986) was an Australian politician who represented the South Australian House of Assembly seat of Peake from 1970 to 1979 for the Labor Party.

Political offices
Preceded by Glen Broomhill	Minister for the Environment; 1975–1977	Succeeded by Des Corcoran
Preceded by Glen Broomhill	Minister Assisting the Premier; 1976–1979	Ministry abolished
Preceded by Don Banfield	Chief Secretary; 1977–1979	Succeeded by Allan Rodda
Parliament of South Australia
New seat	Member for Peake; 1970–1979	Succeeded by Keith Plunkett
