= Electoral district of Goyder =

Goyder South Australia—House of Assembly
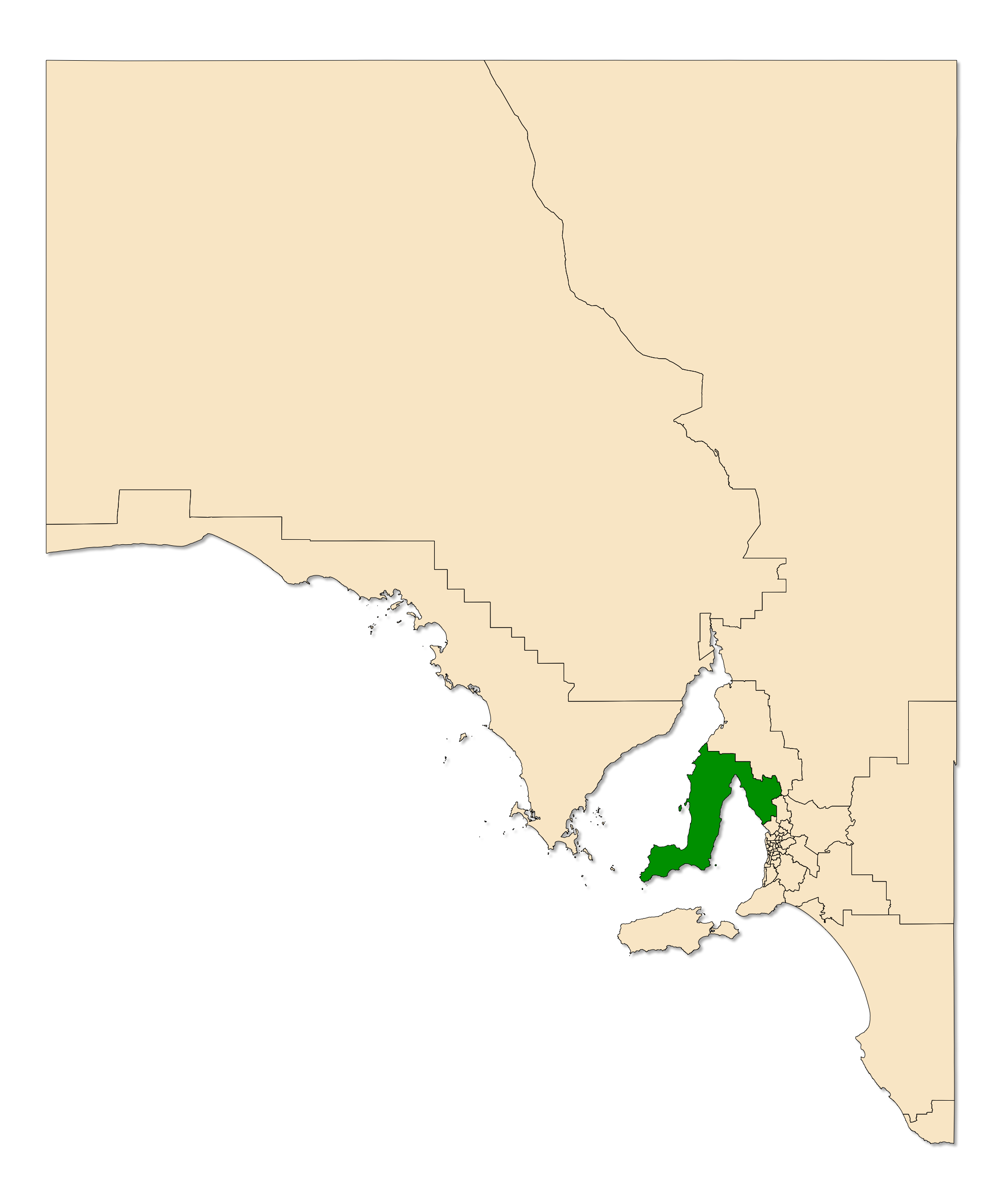
- 2014 extent of the electoral district of Goyder (green) in South Australia
- State: South Australia
- Created: 1970
- Abolished: 2018
- Namesake: George Goyder
- Electors: 24,777 (2014)
- Area: 9,258 km^{2} (3,574.5 sq mi)
- Demographic: Rural
- Coordinates: 34°34′59″S 137°45′47″E

Goyder was an electoral district of the South Australian House of Assembly. It was a 9,258 km^{2} rural electorate located on the Yorke Peninsula and taking in the towns of Ardrossan, Bute, Edithburgh, Kadina, Maitland, Minlaton, Moonta, Port Wakefield, Wallaroo and Yorketown. The electorate was named after George Goyder, a former state Surveyor-General famous for developing Goyder's Line, which indicated the area of the state that had enough rainfall to be suitable for agriculture.

From the 2018 election, Goyder was renamed to Narungga.

== History ==
The abolished seat of Yorke Peninsula formed part of the newly created seat of Goyder at the 1970 election. Goyder has been in non-Labor hands for the entire time from its creation at the electoral redistribution of 1969 until it was abolished in 2018. Much of the seat's territory had been represented by non-Labor MPs without interruption since the change to single-member seats in 1938. Even during Labor's landslide victory of 2006, it only managed 40.9 percent of the two-party vote.

However, Goyder had a surprisingly turbulent history. James Ferguson, the last member for Yorke Peninsula, retained Goyder at the 1970 election for the conservative Liberal and Country League. However, former LCL leader and Premier Steele Hall won it for the breakaway Liberal Movement at the 1973 election. Hall resigned in 1974 to run for the Australian Senate at the 1974 federal election, and his seat was successfully held for the Liberal Movement by David Boundy at a 1974 by-election. In 1976, the Liberal Movement merged back into the Liberal Party (the Liberal and Country League having changed its name to that of the federal party after the initial split), and Boundy won Liberal preselection for the seat at the 1977 election. However, Boundy's preselection opponent, Keith Russack, subsequently contested and won the election as an independent Liberal, and was later accepted back into the party. He was succeeded by John Meier at the 1982 election, who subsequently held the seat comfortably for 24 years. Meier retired at the 2006 election and successor candidate Steven Griffiths held the seat on equally comfortable margins. As a measure of the Liberals' strength in the seat, in 2006, the Liberals suffered a swing of over seven percent amid their statewide collapse, but Griffiths still managed to win 59.1 percent of the two-party vote after winning an outright majority on the first count.

== Members for Goyder ==
Member	Party	Term
James Ferguson	Liberal and Country	1970–1973
Steele Hall	Liberal Movement	1973–1974
David Boundy	Liberal Movement	1974–1976
David Boundy	Liberal	1976–1977
Keith Russack	Independent Liberal	1977
Keith Russack	Liberal	1977–1982
John Meier	Liberal	1982–2006
Steven Griffiths	Liberal	2006–2018

== Election results ==
2014 South Australian state election: Goyder
Party	Candidate	Votes	%	±%
Liberal	Steven Griffiths	11,968	53.7	−4.5
Labor	Elyse Ramsay	6,394	28.7	+1.6
Family First	John Bennett	1,633	7.3	+0.1
Independent	Bob Nicholls	1,126	5.1	+5.1
Greens	Graham Smith	744	3.3	−1.8
National	Kim McWaters	416	1.9	+1.9
Total formal votes		22,281	96.2	+0.2
Informal votes		878	3.8	−0.2
Turnout		23,159	93.5	−0.3
Two-party-preferred result
Liberal	Steven Griffiths	14,022	62.9	−2.8
Labor	Elyse Ramsay	8,259	37.1	+2.8
Liberal hold		Swing	−2.8	
