= Heini Becker =

Australian politician (born 1935)

Heinrich Thomas Becker AM

Member of the South Australian Parliament for Hanson
- In office 30 May 1970 – 10 Dec 1993
- Preceded by: New District
- Succeeded by: Stewart Leggett

Member of the South Australian Parliament for Peake
- In office 11 Dec 1993 – 10 Oct 1997
- Preceded by: Vic Heron
- Succeeded by: Tom Koutsantonis

Personal details
- Born: 18 January 1935 (age 91)
- Party: LCL (1970-1974); Liberal (1974-1997)

Heinrich Thomas "Heini" Becker AM (born 18 January 1935) is a former South Australian politician who represented the South Australian House of Assembly seats of Hanson from 1970 to 1993 and Peake from 1993 to 1997 for the Liberal Party. He was on the Public Accounts Committee and the Economic and Finance Committee.

Becker's father was Dr. Johannes Heinrich Becker, who was interned during World War II for having Nazi connections, and was deported to West Germany in 1947.

South Australian House of Assembly
New seat	Member for Hanson; 1970–1993	Succeeded by Stewart Leggett
Preceded by Vic Heron	Member for Peake; 1993–1997	Succeeded by Tom Koutsantonis
