= Sheila Allen =

Sheila Allen may refer to:

- Sheila Matthews Allen (1929–2013), American actress
- Sheila Allen (sociologist) (1930–2009), English sociologist and academic
- Sheila Allen (English actress) (1932–2011), English actress
