= Scarlet Alliance =

Australia's national peak sex worker organisation

- Founded: 1989
- Region served: Australia
- Website: scarletalliance.org.au

Scarlet Alliance is Australia's national peak sex worker organisation. It was formed in 1989. As an organisation maintained entirely by current and former sex workers, Scarlet Alliance aims to achieve equality, social, legal, political, cultural and economic justice for workers in the sex industry.

== Funding ==
Since its inception, Scarlet Alliance has primarily relied on volunteers to manage the organisation. Despite receiving various governmental funding grants over the last decade and a half, the majority of Scarlet Alliance's work has remained unfunded. The organisation has stated its commitment to aims and objectives, to its membership and the broader sex worker community as always coming first. However, if funding can be sourced towards supporting key areas of this work without compromising political objectives, then it has been sought in order to boost the organisation's capacity as well as to support greater equity and access to events such as the annual national forum. In 2004 Scarlet Alliance was granted government funding to undertake project work in Australia and within the Asia-Pacific region. This funding came to an end in 2012 when the Australian government allocated a greater amount of "foreign aid" towards running offshore detention facilities (defunding other projects).

Scarlet Alliance also employed two part-time bilingual migrant sex workers (Thai, Chinese and/or Korean) for nine years as part of a successful migration project with Empower Thailand. The project was informed by a steering committee of migrant sex workers across Australia and ensured migrant sex workers were represented in Australia's round table which met to respond to trafficking.

== Aim ==
Scarlet Alliance advocates on behalf of a membership consisting of:

- individual sex workers
- funded state level sex worker organisations
- peer led sex worker projects
- unfunded sex worker activist networks
- sex worker interest groups

The organisation aims to inform and influence the policies of:

- state and national governments
- primary health care service providing medical services to sex workers
- state and federal police
- the Australian Department of Immigration and Citizenship (DIAC)
- the Commonwealth Attorney-General's Department
- political parties
- interest groups within the sex industry
- regional and international funding bodies

Scarlet Alliance aims to promote an increased understanding of sex workers and the issues affecting them. The organisation lobbies for policies which recognise sex workers as self-determining agents, with the option to choose where and how they work. Scarlet Alliance has undertaken campaigns to increase occupational health and safety standards in the sex industry, to recognize the human rights and labour rights of sex workers, and to repeal laws and policies which discriminate against sex workers.

== Organisation ==
As a national organisation, Scarlet Alliance facilitates an annual membership forum which is attended by sex worker delegates from around Australia. Every year the forum is held in a different state to maximise the inclusion of local sex workers. An Annual General Meeting (AGM) and public symposium or rally are also included within the forum's program.

Scarlet Alliance holds training, participates in forums and presents workshops at universities in Australia and within the Asia-Pacific region. The organisation aims to break down the stigma, negative stereotyping and popular misconceptions surrounding sex work. Advocates from the organisation present evidence based research and information about who sex workers are, what is involved in sex work and why sex workers choose sex work.

Scarlet Alliance produced an annual magazine, proVision from 2016 to 2020. The magazine contained information about the organisation's activities, articles exploring current sex work policy issues and contributions from national and international sex workers. In keeping with the principle of community ownership, proVision was produced entirely by sex workers.

Scarlet Alliance networks with sister peer led sex worker organisations including:

- Friends Frangipani Association in Papua New Guinea
- Empower in Thailand
- IUSW on the United Kingdom
- DMSC in India
- Women's Network for Unity in Cambodia
- COSWAS in Taiwan
- Call Off Your Old Tired Ethics (COYOTE) in the United States
- Ziteng in Hong Kong

Scarlet Alliance is a member of the Asia Pacific Network of Sex Workers (APNSW) and the Global Network of Sex Work Projects (NSWP).

== Training ==
The Scarlet Alliance National Training Program (SANTP) is a series of online, self-paced training modules by and for sex workers.

Modules in the training project include:

- sex work and sex workers
- peer education
- anti-trafficking policy and sex worker rights
- community development
- advocacy and representation
- sex work law reform
- delivering sex worker awareness training
- safer sex and sexual health
- sex worker outreach

The training package was developed as a strategy to assist sex worker organisations and projects to deliver a nationally consistent standard of peer education.

== Lobbying ==
Scarlet Alliance is a key advocate and participant in HIV and sexually transmitted infection (STI) prevention work in Australia. Sex worker communities in Australia have high rates of condom use, and low rates of STIs, including HIV/AIDS. The Australian sex industry's low rates of STIs and HIV has been attributed to sex worker communities self organising to form peer led sex worker advocacy organisations in the early years of the HIV epidemic. Sex worker organisations, including Scarlet Alliance, employed community development principles to educate sex workers, sex industry business owners and sex industry clients about the need to adopt safer sex practices and harm reduction strategies to avoid potentially contracting HIV. Scarlet Alliance continues to lobby state and national governments about the difficulties of effective HIV prevention whilst sex work remains a criminalised occupation.

Scarlet Alliance has advocated for the rights of migrant sex workers for more than 15 years, and currently works to assist the Australian government to develop anti-trafficking policy which does not single out the sex industry for "raids and rescues". Scarlet Alliance advocates for the provision of work visas for migrant sex workers. The organisation argues that through accessing legal migration options, migrant sex workers are less susceptible to entering into verbal "debt bondage" contracts as an incentive to obtain passage to, and work within, Australia.

Scarlet Alliance's objectives, policies and current campaign issues are available on their website.

== See also ==
- Scarlet Road
