= Michael Sharkey =

Australian poet

Michael Sharkey (born 1 August 1946 in Canterbury, New South Wales) is an Australian poet, resident in Castlemaine in the goldfields region of Victoria.

He studied at the University of Sydney, where he was awarded a BA degree in 1972, and then at the University of Auckland where he was awarded a PhD in 1976 for his dissertation on Lord Byron's poetical dramas. His doctoral advisor was M. K. Joseph.

== Literary activity ==
Michael Sharkey is a biographer, poet and reviewer of Australian and New Zealand poetry and journalism, having published over 700 works. He established Fat Possum Press in Armidale NSW (1979–1986) with Winifred Belmont and co-edited with her Trans-Tasman Undercurrent literary magazine in Melbourne (1986). His poems have appeared in literary anthologies, journals and newspapers in Australia, New Zealand, India, the UK, USA, Canada, Mexico, Italy, Syria, China and France.

He was poetry editor, later coordinating editor of the Australian literary journal Ulitarra from 1992 to 2001, and has guest-edited poetry issues of other magazines including Hobo and Famous Reporter. He has also worked as a freelance writer, editor and publisher's reader, and as a Writer in the Community for the Box Hill-Doncaster Regional Library in Victoria and the Blue Mountains City Library in New South Wales.

He was a regular book reviewer for the Australian Book Review, and the Australian and Courier Mail newspapers and has contributed biographical essays to the Australian Dictionary of Biography, the Dictionary of New Zealand Biography and other publications.

He has conducted poetry seminars and read poetry at several German universities including RWTH (Aachen), Osnabrück, the Humboldt (Berlin), Trier, Munich, Kiel, and the Free University (Berlin). He has also been a guest poet and lecturer at London University and University College Dublin.

In recent years, he has read poetry at Australian literary events including the Victorian Arts Festival, the Queensland Poetry Festival, the Sydney Poetry Festival and the Bellingen Readers and Writers Festival. He has also served as a judge of State-sponsored literary awards for the Northern Territory and New South Wales. In 2014 he was appointed editor of the Australian Poetry Journal, from which he retired in December 2016.

=== Academic history ===
Sharkey studied at the University of Sydney, where he was awarded a BA degree in 1972, and then at the University of Auckland where he was awarded a PhD in 1976 for his dissertation on Lord Byron's poetical dramas. His doctoral work was supervised by M. K. Joseph.

Sharkey was an Associate Professor of Rhetorical Analysis, Writing, and American Literature at the School of English, Communication and Theatre at the University of New England from 1992 until his resignation in 2010.

His academic career included appointments as a Teaching Fellow in English literature at Sydney University (1972–73) and in New Zealand literature at Auckland University (1974), and as a Tutor in English at the University of New England (1977–81). He lectured in Australian and American literature, and in critical theory at the University of Southern Queensland (1983–84) and as a part-time lecturer in Australian cultural studies and Renaissance literature at Melbourne University of Technology (1985–87). He was an Assistant Professor of American and English literature at Bond University, Queensland from 1989 to 1990.

He has conducted seminars on diverse topics at Beijing Foreign Languages University, Luo Yang Foreign Languages University, and City University (Hong Kong).

== Selected publications ==
- The Foliage in the Underworld (2019), Puncher & Wattmann
- Many Such as She: Victorian Australian Women Poets of World War One (2018), Walleah Press
- In the Real World (and other poems) (2017), Burringbah Books
- The Poetic Eye: Occasional Writings 1982–2012 (2017), Brill
- Apollo in George Street: The Life of David McKee Wright (2012), Puncher & Wattmann
- Another Fine Morning in Paradise (2012), Five Islands Press
- The Sweeping Plain (2007), Five Islands Press
- History: Selected Poems 1978–2000 (2002), Five Islands Press
- The Easy Writer: Formal English for Academic Purposes (2006), with W. Belmont, Pearson Education
- Poems 2001 (2001), Kardoorair
- Park (2000), Kardoorair
- Waiting for Rain: More Love Poems (1998), Kardoorair
- Waiting for Rain: More Love Poems (1996), Kardoorair
- Strange Journey: Poems (1995), Kardoorair
- Look, He Said: Poems 1994 (1994), Kardoorair
- Alive in Difficult Times: Poems 1985–1991 (1991), Kardoorair
- An Illustrated Treasury of Australian Humour (1988), edited, Oxford University Press
- The Way It Is: Selected Poems (1984), Darling Downs Institute Press
- Braindamage Festers and a Louisville Ford Truck Songbook (1981), Fat Possum Press
- Barbarians (1981), Fat Possum Press
- Woodcuts (1978), Parnassus Press

== Selected Essays ==
- 2009, 'Why Men leave home: the flight of the suburban male in some Australian fiction 1910–1950', Serious Frolic: Essays on Australian Humour, eds Frances De Groen and Peter Kirkpatrick, St Lucia: University of Queensland Press, 110–123.
- 2007, 'But who considers woman day by day?: Australian women poets and World War I', Australian Literary Studies, Vol. 23, No. 1, 63–78.
- 2006, 'Byron's Deluge: Heaven and Earth', The Byron Journal, Vol. 34, No. 1, 35–48.
- 2001, 'Class of His Own: Francis Adams, Fiction and Biography', Journal of Australian Colonial History, Vol. 3, No. 2, 104–110.
- 1996, (with Horgan, M.), 'Vision Splendid or Sandy Blight? The Lawson-Paterson Debate', The 1890s: Australian Literature and Literary Culture, ed. Ken Stewart, University of Queensland Press, St Lucia, 66–94.
- 1995, 'Wisdom', The Eleven Saving Virtues, ed. Ross Fitzgerald, Melbourne, Minerva, 167–192.
- 1994, '"Dear Beppo": Recuperating Margaret Fane', Wallflower and Witches: Women and Culture in Australia 1910–1945, ed. Maryanne Dever, University of Queensland Press, St Lucia,115–132.
- 1993, 'Introduction to Lennie Lower's "Here's Luck"', Lennie Lower: He Made a Nation Laugh, Angus & Robertson, Sydney, v–xi.
- 1983, 'Rosa Praed's Colonial Heroines', Who Is She? Images of Women in Australian Literature, ed. Shirley Walker, St Lucia, University of Queensland Press, 26–36.
