= Human trafficking in Australia =

Human trafficking in Australia is illegal under Divisions 270 and 271 of the Criminal Code (Cth). In September 2005, Australia ratified the Protocol to Prevent, Suppress and Punish Trafficking in Persons, especially Women and Children, which supplemented the United Nations Convention against Transnational Organized Crime. Amendments to the Criminal Code were made in 2005 to implement the Protocol.

Australia's response to human trafficking has been evolving significantly since 2005. From the government concentrating mainly on sex trafficking, to placing more focus on labour trafficking, forced marriage, organ removal and criminal exploitation.

In 2017, the government investigated 166 trafficking cases, compared to the 105 of 2016, of which six defendants were prosecuted and five traffickers were convicted. Prosecutions from 2016 were continued in 2017 by the authorities against 14 defendants, in which one sex trafficker, and in another case four labour traffickers, were convicted.

The extent of human trafficking in Australia is difficult to quantify. However, it has been estimated that between 300 and 1000 persons are victims of trafficking a year. The United Nations Office on Drugs and Crime (UNODC) lists Australia as one of 21 trafficking destination countries in the high destination category.

The Australian Institute of Criminology has stated:

Suspected victims of trafficking are in a unique position. Like other victims of crime, they may be deeply affected by their experience; but, unlike other victims of crime, they may also have a tenuous migration status in a foreign country, where they may speak little of the language and know only the people who have exploited them. In addition, there is the fear of being identified as a victim of crime. As a result, suspected victims of trafficking can be highly vulnerable and isolated.

Migrant sex workers targeted by anti-trafficking policing in Australia have had their human rights curtailed and their workplaces have been impacted in negative ways.

According to the U.S. Department of State, 2018 Trafficking in Persons Report (TIP), Australia fully met the standards for the elimination of trafficking and was placed on Tier 1. The government proved to have made significant efforts during the reporting year by investigating more cases, identifying and referring more victims to services, convicting more traffickers, and administering programs to provide services to community groups and assistance to workers.

The U.S. State Department's Office to Monitor and Combat Trafficking in Persons placed the country in "Tier 1" in 2017 and 2023.

In 2023, the Organised Crime Index gave the country a score of 3.5 out of 10 for human trafficking, noting that two-thirds of prosecutions did not reach court.

== Recent cases ==
In February 2010, two traffickers were convicted in Cairns Supreme Court on charges of possessing and using a slave after luring a Filipina woman to Australia and enslaving her as a domestic servant and concubine.

In late March 2010, a Tasmanian court sentenced one trafficker to ten years' imprisonment for prostituting a 12-year-old girl to more than 100 clients in 2009.

== Federal legislation ==
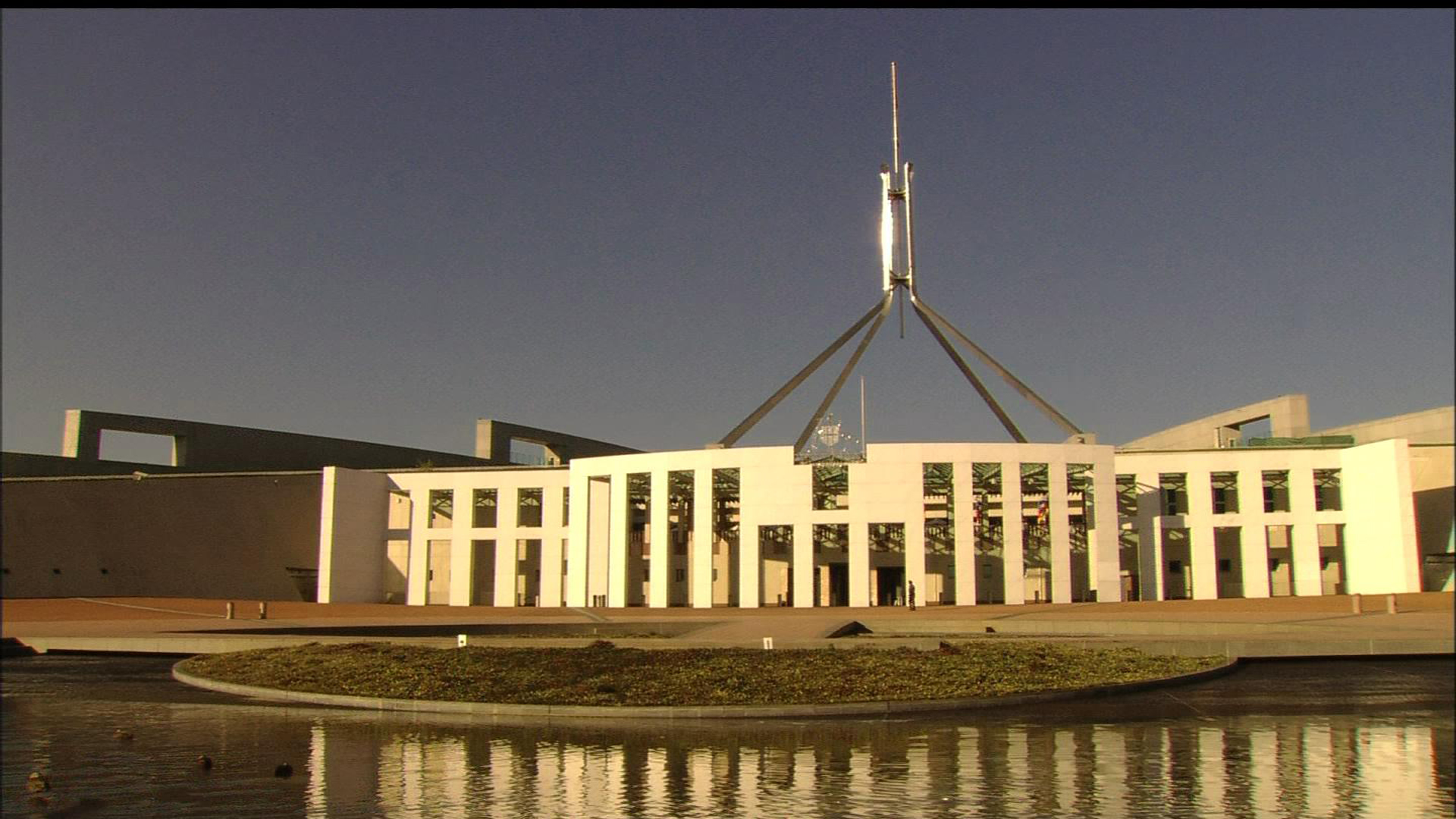
Parliament of Australia

In 1999, the Commonwealth amended the Criminal Code Act 1995 to implement the Protocol to Prevent, Suppress and Punish Trafficking in Persons, especially Women and Children, supplementing the United Nations Convention Against Transnational Organised Crime relating to slavery, sexual servitude and deceptive recruiting for sexual services.

Offences specifically relating to trafficking in persons were added to the Criminal Code in 2005 by the Criminal Code Amendment (Trafficking in Persons Offences) Act 2005. The amendment inserted people trafficking and debt bondage offences into the Commonwealth Criminal Code and amended the existing provisions related to deceptive recruiting for sexual services. The amendments reflected the growing recognition that people trafficking is not a problem which is restricted to the sex industry.

Criminal Code includes offences and maximum sentences for:

- slavery (25 years)
- sexual servitude (15 years)
- deceptive recruitment for sexual servitude (seven years).

Section 271 of the Criminal Code includes offences and maximum sentences for:

- trafficking in persons (12 years)
- trafficking in children (25 years)
- domestic trafficking in persons (12 years)
- debt bondage (12 months).

The penalties are higher when children are involved.

Under the Migration Act 1958 (Cth) it is an offence for an employer, labour hire company, employment agency or other person to knowingly or recklessly allow a non-citizen without work rights to work, or to refer them for work. Following the Migration Amendment (Employer Sanctions) Act 2007, the exploitation of unlawful non-citizen workers are aggravating factors attracting a higher penalty. The maximum penalties are five years imprisonment, and/or fines of up to $33,000 (AUD) for people and $165,000 (AUD) for companies per worker.

Several federal laws support the investigation of trafficking offences. For example, the trafficking offences in the Criminal Code are specifically designated as serious crimes in the Telecommunications (Interception and Access) Act 1979. Consequently, designated law enforcement agencies, including the Australian Federal Police, can seek permission to intercept relevant telephone calls and emails for the purposes of investigating trafficking offences. This information can be used as evidence in court. Information obtained through telephone interception has been important evidence in at least one Australian trafficking prosecution ( Sieders v R; Yotchomchin v R [2008] NSWCCA 187).

Trafficking offences in the Criminal Code are supported by the Proceeds of Crime Act 2002. If the matter involves a 'serious offence' (which includes the offences of slavery, sexual servitude and deceptive recruiting for sexual servitude), a judge can issue a monitoring order to require a financial institution to provide information about transactions conducted during a certain period. Ultimately, the regime allows for a court to order the restraint and forfeiture of proceeds of certain crimes. All Australian jurisdictions have legislation regarding proceeds of crime.

The National Children's Youth and Law Center reported 250 cases of child marriages in 2011 and 2013. The majority of cases being that the child was forced by family members to marry someone overseas without their full consent. The government strengthened the offence of forced marriage with the implementation of the Crimes Legislation Amendment Powers, Offences and Other Measures Act 2015. Which was first introduced in 2013.

Modern slavery in Australia involves mostly migrants, and a few Australia citizens. The majority of migrants are coming from India, the Philippines, Thailand and Afghanistan. In the 2015/16 financial year, there were 80 clients on the Support for Trafficking People Program (STPP) of which 68 were foreign citizens. The majority of Australian states and territories use the Fair Work Act 2009 to cover the domestic workers, providing a minimum employment standard and workplace protection. In 2016, the Migrant Workers Taskforce was established to intensify the government's commitment to stop the exploitation of vulnerable migrant workers. The Fair Work Act was amended in 2017 with the passing of the Fair Work Amendment (Protecting Vulnerable Workers) Bill by both Houses of Parliament.

In 2017, the government increased law enforcement efforts, where divisions 270 and 271 of the Commonwealth Criminal Code which pertain to sex and labour trafficking, identified maximum penalties of 12 to 25 years in prison and fines of up to AUD197,000 ($154,030). Forced labour is also criminalized in the criminal code with a recommended penalty of nine years in prison.

Assistant Minister for Home Affairs, Hon Alex Hawke MP, was committed to present the Parliamentary draft of the Modern Slavery Act by June 2018. The Act is to be a crucial legislative tool in order to combat and prevent human trafficking and slavery in Australia and overseas. On top of implementing the Act, the minister also announced the implementation of a 12-month trail of the Support for Trafficking People Program to assist girls and young women that are seeking help in forced marriage cases.

In January 2019, the Federal legislation set the Modern Slavery Act 2018 (MSA) into place, requiring companies in Australia to submit a Modern Slavery Statement to the Federal Government when it has a minimum annual consolidated revenue of $100 million, including the company and its subsidiaries. The statements need to address mandatory criteria from Part 2 of the Commonwealth Act, including the company's structure, operations and supply chains, the modern slavery risks in those areas, the necessary actions in which the company has taken to address those risks and its effectiveness, as well as state the consultation process with its subsidiaries throughout the Modern Slavery Statement process.

=== Other Australian jurisdictions ===
In addition to federal anti-trafficking laws, all jurisdictions have a range of offence provisions to cover related crimes, such as assault, sexual assault, forced prostitution, kidnapping and deprivation of liberty. State offence provisions have been used in conjunction with federal offence provisions in at least two prosecutions in Australia: Commonwealth DPP v Xu [2005] NSWSC 191 and R v Dobie (Unreported, Queensland District Court, Clare J, 23 December 2009).

=== Government policy and strategy ===
In 2004 the Federal government launched the Commonwealth Action Plan to Eradicate Trafficking in Person, comprising four elements. These are prevention, detection and investigation, criminal prosecution, victim support and rehabilitation

Building on this earlier work, in 2008 the Federal Government outlined its key measures in its Anti-Trafficking Strategy which included;

1. dedicated Australian Federal Police teams to investigate people trafficking operations
2. a National Policing Strategy to Combat Trafficking in Women for Sexual Servitude
3. visa arrangements for potentially trafficked persons
4. victim support measures to assist victims of trafficking
5. Senior Migration Officer Compliance positions in Thailand, China and the Philippines to help prevent trafficking at its source
6. a targeted Communication Awareness Strategy providing information about trafficking and the help available
7. improved legislation to combat trafficking in persons
8. increased regional cooperation to combat people smuggling and trafficking in persons
9. support for the Commonwealth Director to Public Prosecutions to prosecute trafficking matters, including funding and training
10. research into trafficking trends in our region, including labour trafficking, and
11. return and reintegration support for victims of trafficking returning to their countries of origin.

In December 2008 the Australian Attorney-General established the National Consultation on Human Rights to consider the protection of human rights in Australia. More information about the National Consultation is available at Human Rights Consultation.

== The visa system and victim support ==
=== Support for Victims of People Trafficking Program ===
The Federal government's Support for Victims of People Trafficking Program provides individualised case management and a range of support to victims. The program is integrated within the federal government's visa system.

A person is identified as eligible by the Australian Federal Police. Usually the person enters the Program on a Bridging Visa F (BVF), which is valid for up to 45 days. Recipients of the BVF are not permitted to undertake paid employment. The BVF may then be extended for a further 45 days on a case-by-case basis.

The Australian Government Office for Women administers the Program and has contracted the Australian Red Cross to provide case management services.

Individual case managers are responsible for ensuring the appropriate delivery of support services, to meet clients' individual needs.

The Australian Federal Police Annual Report 2008/2009 stated that the AFP has sponsored 146 people into the Support for Victims of People Trafficking Program administered by the Office for Women within the Department of Families, Housing, Community Services and Indigenous Affairs. This program commenced in 2004.

The number of trafficking visas issued between 2004–05 and 2009–10 were:

Type of Trafficking Visa	2004–05	2005–2006	2006–2007	2007–2008	2008–2009	2009–2010
Bridging F visa	31	11	16	34	39	33
Criminal Justice Stay visa	23	8	18	18	30	23
Witness Protection (Trafficking) (Temporary) visa	0	0	4	13	0	n.a
Witness Protection (Trafficking) (Permanent) visa	0	0	0	0	5	21

As of July 2009, the Witness Protection (Trafficking) (Temporary) visa has been removed and merged into the Witness Protection (Trafficking) (Permanent) visa. As of 1 July 2015, the Migration Legislation Amendment (2015 Measures No. 2) Regulation 2015 had the effect of renaming the Witness Protection (Trafficking) (Permanent) visa hto the Referred Stay (Permanent) visa. The Migration Legislation Amendment (2015 Measures No. 2) Regulation 2015 also had the effect of phasing out the Criminal Justice Stay Visa so that future trafficked persons would only be placed on a Bridging Visa F.

=== 2 Phase visa system for victims of human trafficking ===
==== Stage 1: Bridging Visa F (BVF) (Item 1306) ====
BVFs may be granted to 'persons of interest' to the police in relation to offences/alleged offences of people trafficking, sexual servitude or deceptive recruiting. It entitles the non-citizen person to stay lawfully in the community and out of detention. During this period the person is not eligible for any social security payments and may not work.

While suspected victims are on the BFV, clients of the program have access to following federally funded support, which is payable through Centrelink:

- secure accommodation (approximately $140 to $160 per night)
- a living allowance ($170 per fortnight)
- a food allowance ($170 per fortnight)
- a one-off amount of $310 to purchase essentials such as clothing and toiletries
- health care services including counselling
- legal services (a maximum of three appointments per client are available throughout the program).

From commencement of the BFV on 1 January 2004 to 31 December 2007, 81 BFVs were issued relating to 78 people.

This visa is valid for 45 days and may be terminated at any time. On termination the person will lose any benefit of the victim support program and is obligated to leave Australia otherwise they will be detained and repatriated.

==== Stage 2: Referred Stay (Permanent) Visa ====
The Referred Stay (Permanent) Visa may be offered by the Department of Immigration and Border Protection (DIBP) to a trafficked person if:

- The referred stay applicant is in Australia
- The Attorney‑General has, after taking into account information provided by a member of the Australian Federal Police of the substantive rank of Commander, or above, issued a certificate in relation to the referred stay applicant.
- The Attorney‑General's certificate is to the effect that the referred stay applicant made a contribution to, and cooperated closely with, an investigation in relation to another person who was alleged to have engaged in human trafficking, slavery or slavery‑like practices. (It does not matter if the investigation fails to proceed to a stage where it is referred to the Director of Public Prosecutions.)
- The person is not the subject of any related prosecutions.
- The Minister (for Immigration) is satisfied that the person would be at significant personal danger were the person to return to their own country.

If the referred stay applicant meets the relevant criteria and accepts the offer from the DIBP to apply, the person may be issued with a Referred Stay (Permanent) Visa.

==== Victim Support Program to persons who leave Australia but return as witnesses ====
From 1 July 2007, a new phase of the victim support program is available to suspected victims of trafficking who have left Australia but who return as witnesses. They are provided with secure accommodation, living allowance and food allowance.

From 20 May 2004 to 31 January 2008, the service had provided support to 88 clients. The majority of clients were Thai women (62); far smaller numbers of clients were from other countries in Asia and Europe.

=== Effectiveness of the 'Support for Victims of People Trafficking Program' ===
The Commonwealth visa framework as evaluated in Trafficking and Slavery in Australia: An Evaluation of Victim Support Strategies reflects a law enforcement agenda where the human rights of trafficking victims are incidental to prosecutions. The visa framework falls short of protecting the human rights of trafficking victims who are unable to assist in the criminal justice process. Trafficking victims should be eligible for visas on the basis of their status as victims of trafficking, their safety needs and their need for victim support. Protection for trafficking victims should not be contingent on victims' ability to act as witnesses.

At present only through the visa system can victims of trafficking access the support for victims of trafficking that was introduced by the Action Plan. The victim support program provides support in phases reflecting the different phases of the visa system for suspected victims of trafficking.

It has been argued that the credibility of the alleged trafficking victims is inadvertently undermined by the government's decision to make victim support and visas dependent on the ability of a person to assist a prosecution or investigation into trafficking. Prosecutors have been reported as saying that victim support measures, including visa regimes for victims as witnesses are vital. However these issues need to be managed carefully as part of the investigation and prosecution process. Justice Keleman the trial judge in Kwok was reported as saying that income support measures could be seen as appropriate to facilitate the prosecution or 'on the other hand, as providing a powerful inducement to give false evidence'

=== Legal reform ===
While trafficking is a crime involving people trafficking, security issues, immigration fraud and human rights abuses, a singular focus on criminal justice outcomes fails to assist many trafficked persons.

In Australian Trafficking Visas: 15 recommendations to better protect victims of human trafficking, 15 recommendations were mooted. Recommendations include but are not limited to improved public access to information about the trafficking visa framework, reform to the period, quality and humanity of protection afforded by the visa system, restructuring of decision-making processes and the introduction of a new complementary protection/humanitarian visa for those persons who have trafficked and who are unable to participate in a criminal investigation or prosecution where there are factors of a compassionate or compelling nature.

In November 2008, the Australian government released its 457 Integrity Review containing a significant number of recommendations to improve subclass 457 visas and overcome latent workplace discrimination. Subclass 457 visas relate to the Australian temporary skilled migration program.

== Law enforcement ==
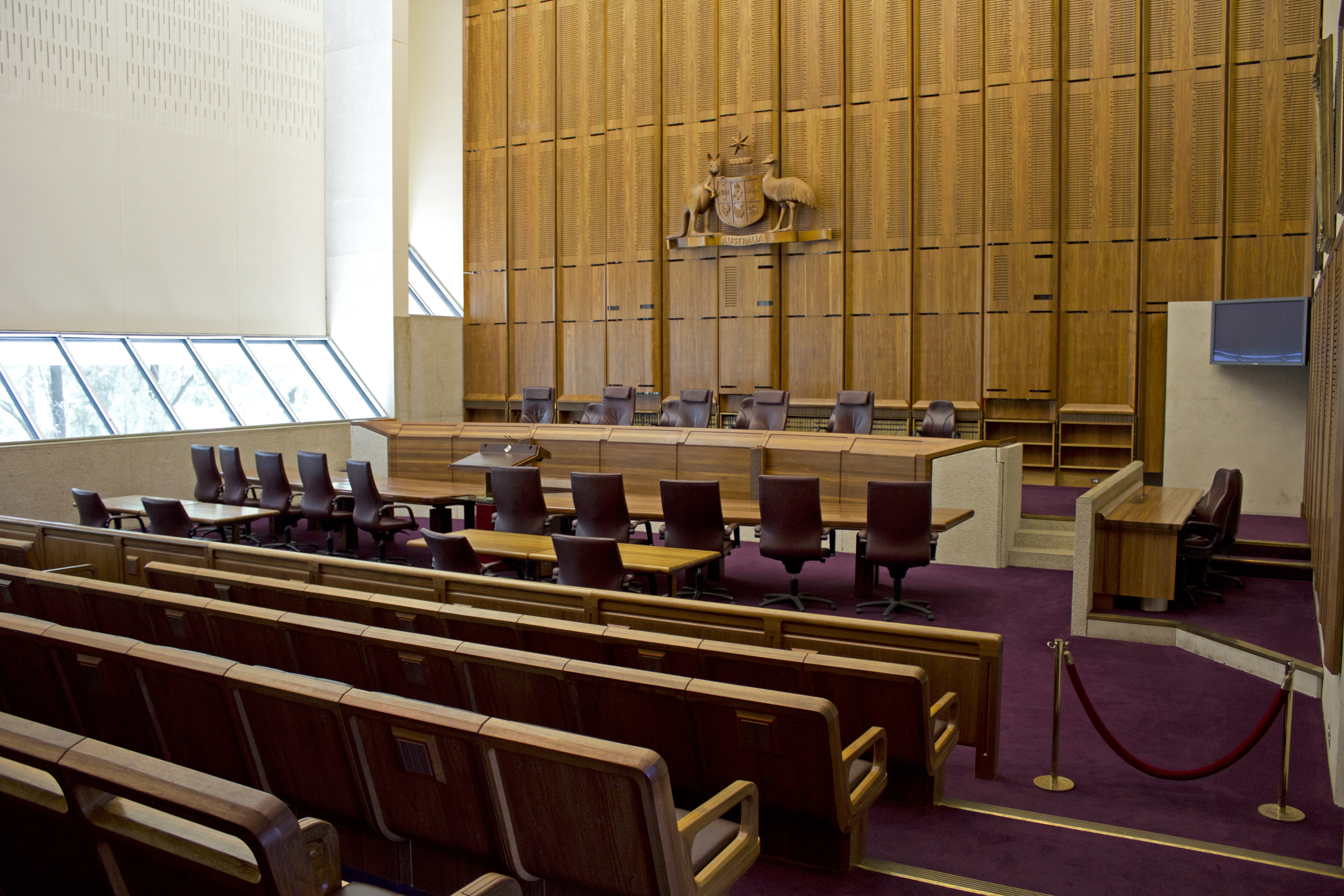
High Court of Australia

As noted in Trafficking of women for sexual purposes the Office of the Commonwealth Director of Public Prosecutions has of 31 January 2008, received briefs of evidence from the Australian Federal Police concerning 29 defendants alleged to have committed trafficking offences.

In its June 2008 annual report the AFP reported that since 1 January 2004, it has undertaken more than 150 assessments and investigations of allegations of trafficking-related offences including slavery, deceptive recruiting and/or sexual servitude. There were also two investigations where labour exploitation was the primary criminal conduct. These investigations have led to 34 people being charged with trafficking-related offences.

As of 1 October 2008 of the 34 people charged with trafficking related offences there has been only two cases involving the charges of trafficking in person under the federal Criminal Code and to date, there has been only one conviction under Australia's trafficking offences, Mr Keith Dobie. This is due in part to the fact that the relevant offences were introduced into the federal Criminal Code in 2005. Prior to their enactment, a number of trafficking and trafficking-related cases were prosecuted under sexual slavery and servitude offences which came into operation in 1999.

Cases can extend over a long period of time; for example in Queen v Wei Tang [2008] HCA 39, the defendant Wei Tang was first arrested in 2003 for sexual servitude and was found guilty in August 2008, following appeals to higher courts.

Likewise investigations can be long, complex and resource-intensive. The Melbourne AFP Transnational Sexual Exploitation and Trafficking Team (TSETT]) unit reports that between July 2005 and February 2006, they dedicated 2,976 hours of police time to a particular trafficking operation. This is in addition to the time applied by the other teams involved. The operation included identifying key evidence from 27,000 telephone intercepts, many of which were in a foreign language.

=== Trafficking cases ===
==== R v Yogalingham Rasalingam (2007) NSWDC (Unreported) ====
Mr Rasalingam, an Indian restaurant owner in Glenbrook in the Blue Mountains near Sydney, was charged with trafficking offences under the Criminal Code (Cth).

He was accused of bringing another man from his home town in southern India to Australia and forcing him to work seven days a week, sometimes more than 15 hours a day. During the trial, the victim testified that upon arrival in Australia, his passport and airline ticket were taken away from him, he was forced to sleep on the floor, and was told that he would be deported if he complained to the authorities.

Mr Rasalingam was charged with trafficking a person (s271.2(1B)) and with intentionally exercising control over a slave, (s270.3(1)(d)). The jury found him not guilty on both counts.

==== R v Dobie (Unreported, Queensland District Court, Clare J, 23 December 2009). ====
Keith Dobie was charged on 19 July 2006 with trafficking in persons, presenting false information to an immigration officer, and dealing in the proceeds of crime. Initially pleading not guilty he changed his plea to guilty and was sentenced for 5 years imprisonment. Mr Dobie is the first person in Australia to be convicted for these trafficking offences. On 7 January 2009 Mr Dobie sought leave to appeal the length of his sentence.

The prosecution argued that between 28 November 2005 and 17 April 2006 he was directly involved in the deceptive recruitment of at least two Thai women and was possibly preparing to bring further women from Thailand to Australia.

Emails sent between the women and Mr Dobie suggest that the women had previously worked in the sex industry in Thailand and were aware of the fact that they would be working as sex workers in Australia, but were deceived about the conditions of their stay and employment.

==== Story from the NSW Coroner’s Court ====
After the death of a Thai citizen (Ms Simaplee) in Villawood detention centre on 26 September 2001, the Deputy Coroner found that in September 2001 immigration officers detained Ms Simaplee following a raid on a Sydney brothel in Riley Street, Surry Hills.

While the Deputy Coroner, Carl Milovanovich, was unable to confirm her history of sexual slavery, this being outside his jurisdiction, he was concerned enough to urge law enforcement authorities to address the trafficking of women into prostitution with 'vigour and appropriate resources'. Three days later she died in an observation cell while being treated by detention centre staff for heroin withdrawal.

He also recommended that the Australian Department of Immigration and Citizenship and Australasian Correctional Management (ACM) facilities work together in identifying, assessing and providing the appropriate medical, community and translator services to women who might be identified as being victims of trafficking.

=== Sexual servitude cases ===
Queen v Wei Tang [2008] HCA 39 High Court held that the prosecution did not need to prove that the defendant knew or believed that the women were slaves. The critical powers the defendant exercised were the power to make each woman an object of purchase, the capacity to use the women in a substantially unrestricted manner for the duration of their contracts, the power to control and restrict their movements, and the power to use their services without commensurate compensation. It was held that the prosecution had made out the required elements of the offences.

Sieders v R; Yotchomchin v R [2008] NSWCCA 187. This case involved direct police-to-police cooperation, where the AFP acted in cooperation with the Royal Thai Police to simultaneously execute warrants of arrest in Australia and Thailand. The defendants were charged under the Commonwealth Criminal Code and convicted for conducting a business involving the sexual servitude of others, namely four Thai women who were subject to debt contracts of around $45,000 each. Sieders was sentenced to a maximum of four years imprisonment and Yotchomchin was sentenced to a maximum of five years.

The defendants attempt to appeal their conviction and sentence was dismissed by the NSW Court of Criminal Appeal. With the Court holding at 95 that the 'definition of sexual servitude [in the Commonwealth Criminal Code] ... is concerned only with a very specific respect in which there is a limitation on the freedom of action of the person in question. A person can be free to do a multitude of different things, but if she is not free to cease providing sexual services, or not free to leave the place or area where she provides sexual services, she will, if the other condition of the section is met, be in sexual servitude'.

Other Cases:

- Commonwealth DPP v Xu [2005] NSWSC 191
- R v DS [2005] VSCA 99 – DS pleaded guilty to possessing a slave and engaging in slave trading. DS was sentenced to six years on appeal.
- R v Kovacs [2007] QCA 143 – conviction of the Kovacs for the possession and use of a slave was overturned by the Queensland Court of Appeal and a re-trial ordered, on the basis of a failure of procedural fairness by the trial judge in dealing with the issue that the alleged slave consented to sex for payment.

=== Non-Sex Industry Labour Trafficking ===
Trafficking in persons crimes have also been detected outside of the sex industry. In practice, these crimes tend to be referred to as "labour trafficking" or (non-sex industry) labour trafficking (reflecting the fact that sex work is either legal or decriminalized in most States and Territories).

An Australian Institute of Criminology (AIC) report on Labour Trafficking, launched in November 2010 by the Minister for Home Affairs, examines "what is known about labour trafficking in Australia, based on incidences of reported crimes, but also by drawing on information about unreported crime. It provides an assessment about the known or likely incidence of trafficking in persons that can occur in the agricultural, cleaning, hospitality, construction and manufacturing industries, or in less formal sectors such as domestic work and home-help".

The research suggests "the existence of under-reporting, but a lack of awareness among a wide variety of 'front line' agencies and service providers that certain exploitative practices in a work context are in fact criminal under Australian law". The research confirms that while the precise size of the labour trafficking problem remains unknown, there have been instances of unreported and/or unrecognised labour trafficking. The report gives examples of cases involving domestic workers, and workers in other sectors such as construction, manufacturing and agriculture.

The report also noted that many participants interviewed for the research, including those working directly on anti-trafficking issues, were unsure where to draw the line between "bad work" and criminal conduct such as labour trafficking, and other participants were noticeably unaware that Australia's anti-trafficking laws could apply beyond to contexts outside the sex industry.

The research notes that cases of unreported labour trafficking exist in an environment of broader unlawful conduct perpetrated against migrant workers in Australia. As such, it is important for the anti-trafficking response to consider not only the most extreme instances in isolation, but also the broader environment that is arguably the breeding ground for more severe criminal conduct.

The research raises a number of issues relating to law reform. In particular, the research recommends ensuring: laws are clear, simple and relevant, through a focus on forced labour, servitude and other forms of labour-related forms of exploitation, and expanding criminal laws to cover lower threshold of exploitation, such as abuse of vulnerability for gain.

The report also notes the importance of building community awareness of this crime type particularly amongst front line service providers in the labour sector.

=== Uncovering trafficking ===
According to research conducted by the Australian Institute of Criminology in 2008 on the trafficking of women to Australia for the purpose of sexual exploitation, sources of information leading to trafficking investigations and referrals to the Australian Federal Police have occurred where:

1. The suspected victim of trafficking called 000 (Emergency Services), which occurred in Commonwealth DPP v Xu [2005] NSWSC 191;

2. The suspected victims of trafficking have sought help from their embassy in Australia;

3. The suspected victims of trafficking sought help from the front desk of the local police station;

4. The suspected victims of trafficking have sought help from brothel clients;

o In Sieders v R; Yotchomchin v R [2008] NSWCCA 187 the victim sought help from a client, who then reported the matter to DIAC's Immigration Dob-in Line.

o In Commonwealth DPP v Xu [2005] NSWSC 191, the alleged victim reported having sought help from several clients; none appeared to have reported the matter to the authorities. However, one ex-client provided the victim with practical assistance, in the form of a place to stay, once she was on her own in the Australian community; and,

5. The suspicion of the state police was aroused as a result of proactive investigative activities of the illegal sex industry.

== Trafficking victim support programs and other projects ==
=== Government anti-trafficking in persons projects ===
==== National Roundtable on People Trafficking ====
The purpose of the National Roundtable on People Trafficking (NRPT) is to strengthen Australia's response to people trafficking through a partnership between the Commonwealth Government and NGOs. The NRPT will seek to prevent trafficking, protect victims and prosecute offenders.

In March 2009, the NRPT launched Guidelines for Working with Trafficked People. This publication consists of 10 guidelines developed by NGOs to assist NGOs and government organisations in their work with trafficked people, namely:

1. Understand and protect the rights of trafficked people 2. Always act to protect people's safety 3. Negotiate informed consent 4. Provide appropriate referral information 5. Protect privacy and confidentiality 6. Provide culturally appropriate services 7. Provide professional and ethical services 8. Know how to respond to subpoenas and other requests for information 9. Know how to support witnesses in court proceedings 10. Recognise families and children have special needs

The guidelines also have a referral guide providing contact details of anti-trafficking NGOs and government organizations.

==== Asia Regional Trafficking in Persons (ARTIP) project ====
The Asia Regional Trafficking in Persons (ARTIP) Project is a $21 million program funded over 5 years that directly contributes to preventing human trafficking in the Asia Region. The purpose of the Project is to promote a more effective and coordinated approach to people trafficking by criminal justice systems of governments in the Asia region. ARTIP began in August 2006.

ARTIP was launched in August 2006, initially as an Australian partnership with Thailand, Cambodia, Laos and Burma. Indonesia added in August 2007.

==== UNICEF's Sixth Country Program for Children (CPC VI]) in the Philippines – Children in Need of Special Protection component ====
Australia's contribution of A$22.8 million to the overall program is supporting the Government of the Philippines to implement the convention on the Rights of the Child through a national 'Child-Friendly Movement' (CFM). The program helps communities in their effort to provide universal immunisation, pre-natal care, child growth monitoring, education and child protection.

The child protection component focuses on the needs of children in armed conflict areas, and protecting children against trafficking. Partnerships are developed with local government and capacity building is provided for caregivers working with at-risk children to improve professional responses to child protection issues.

==== The Australia-China Human Rights Technical Cooperation Program (HRTC) ====
Since 1997, Australia has supported activities under the HRTC to help strengthen the promotion, protection and administration of human rights in China. Between 2002 and 2005 this included a series of training activities and workshops for officials and community-level workers on practical methods to combat trafficking of women and children, focused in the provinces of Guizhou and Sichuan. Among the activities supported was a regional anti-trafficking workshop involving officials from Vietnam and Thailand.

The HRTC has also supported many other activities in the legal reform and justice sector and women's rights. Issues addressed have included penitentiary reform (including reform in juvenile justice), training on criminal procedures and a series of workshops on domestic violence.

==== Return and Reintegration of Trafficking Victims from Australia to Thailand (Thai Returnees Project) ====
The goal of this project is to improve the capacity of referral agencies to support and reintegrate suspected victims of trafficking who return from Australia to Thailand. Initially the project will work with Thai agencies and NGOs to improve their ability to receive and care for returning Thais and others. The project will also work to improve their ability to monitor the reintegration of victims and to investigate and prosecute traffickers (who could be Australian or other nationalities).

Project outputs include a common operational framework for government and non-government agencies working on these issues in Thailand. Outputs will also include an information package on services available for victims once they return to Thailand and information brochures available in Bangkok airport.

This project is part of the Australian Government's $20 million initiative against people trafficking announced in October 2003. The International Organization for Migration (IOM) will manage the project.

=== Federal Government support for NGOs ===
In October 2008 the Australian Government announced $1 million to be provided to four non-government organisations, the Anti-Slavery Project, the Scarlett Alliance, the Australian Catholic Religious Against Trafficking in Humans and Project Respect.

=== State Government Support: Victorian Project for victims of trafficking ===
In October 2006, the Victorian Government announced funding for a state-based support program for victims of trafficking. The program is designed to assist victims of trafficking who need support but are not eligible for the Commonwealth program. This might include, for example, victims of trafficking who do not want to talk to the police, or victims of trafficking who may have talked to the police but have been unable to assist a current investigation. The program includes emergency accommodation and support services.

== See also ==
- Crime in Australia
- Blackbirding in Australia
- Slavery in Australia
