= M. K. Joseph =

British-born NZ poet and novelist

Michael Kennedy Joseph (9 July 1914 – 4 October 1981) was a British-born New Zealand poet and novelist in several genres. He studied at Sacred Heart College, Auckland, and at Merton College, Oxford, from 1936 to 1939. During the Second World War he served with the Royal Artillery. His works range from I'll Soldier No More, A Pound of Saffron and A Soldier's Tale to the science fiction works The Hole in the Zero and The Time of Achamoth to a historical novel, Kaspar's Journey, based on the medieval Children's Crusade. The Hole in the Zero includes the first known use of the word "hoverboard".

Joseph was also a Professor of English at the University of Auckland in New Zealand. Notable students include Australian poet Michael Sharkey.

In 1969, he edited the 1831 text of Frankenstein for Oxford University Press; in 1980 the text was reissued in the World's Classics series.

== Works ==
=== Poetry ===
- Imaginary Islands (1950)
- The Living Countries (1959)

=== Novels ===
- I’ll Soldier No More (1958)
- A Pound of Saffron (1962)
- The Hole in the Zero (1967)
- A Soldier’s Tale (1976)
- The Time of Achamoth (1977)
- Kaspar’s Journey (1988)
