= Lisa Adkins =

Australian economic sociologist

- Occupation(s): Sociologist and academic

Lisa Adkins is a sociologist and academic. As of 2018, she holds a professorship at the University of Sydney, where she is also Dean of the Faculty of Arts and Social Sciences. From 2015-2019 she was a Distinguished Professor in the Academy of Finland. She has previously held professorships at the University of Manchester and Goldsmiths, University of London. She has published in the fields of economic sociology and feminist theory, most recently on the welfare state and labour markets under finance capitalism and in post-industrial societies. She was joint editor-in-chief of Australian Feminist Studies from 2015-2024.

== Publications ==
- (Co-authored with M. Konings and M. Cooper) The Asset Economy (Polity Press, 2020)
- The Time of Money (Stanford University Press, 2018).
- (Co-editor with Maryanne Dever and Anthea Taylor) Germaine Greer: Essays on a Feminist Figure (Routledge, 2018)
- (Co-editor with Maryanne Dever) Gender and Labour in New Times (Routledge, 2017).
- (Co-editor with Caragh Brosnan and Steve Threadgold) Bourdieusian Prospects (Routledge, 2016).
- (Co-edited with Maryanne Dever) The Post-Fordist Sexual Contract: Working and Living in Contingency (Palgrave Macmillan, 2016).
- (Co-edited with Celia Lury) Measure and Value (Wiley-Blackwell, 2012).
- (Co-edited with Beverley Skeggs) Feminism after Bourdieu (Blackwell Publishers, 2005).
- Revisions: Gender and Sexuality in Late Modernity (Open University Press, 2002).
- (Co-edited with Diana Leonard) Sex in Question: French Materialist Feminism (Taylor & Francis, 1996).
- (Co-edited with Janet Holland) Sex, Sensibility and the Gendered Body (Palgrave Macmillan, 1996).
- (Co-edited with Vicki Merchant) Sexualizing the Social: Power and the Organization of Sexuality (Palgrave Macmillan, 1996).
- Gendered Work: Sexuality, Family and the Labour Market (Open University Press, 1995).
- Gender: A Sociological Reader. Routledge Studies in Social and Political Thought. Routledge student readers. Ed. Stevi Jackson, Sue Scott; Psychology Press, 465 p. 2002 ISBN 9780415201803
