= Diana Leonard =

British sociologist, anthropologist, and activist (1941–2010)

Diana Mary Leonard
- Born: 13 December 1941; Trinidad
- Died: 27 November 2010 (aged 68)
- Other names: Diana Leonard Barker
- Occupations: Sociologist; social anthropologist

Diana Mary Leonard, AcSS (13 December 1941 – 27 November 2010), known while married as Diana Leonard Barker, was a British sociologist, social anthropologist, academic, and feminist activist. From 1998 to 2007, she was Professor of Sociology at the Institute of Education, London, after which she was Emeritus Professor of the Sociology of Education and Gender department there.

== Life ==
Diana Mary Leonard was born in Trinidad on 13 December 1941; her father was a scientist, her mother a teacher. After the Second World War, the family moved back to the United Kingdom, and Diana continued her education at Brighton and Hove High School and then at Girton College, Cambridge, where she read natural sciences; she developed an enthusiasm for anthropology during her degree but after graduating in 1961, trained and worked as a science teacher in Clapham (1964–67). On relocating to Swansea with her husband's work, she found herself out of a job. She went back to education, this time embarking on doctoral studies at University College, Swansea; returning to social anthropology, she decided to study courtship and marriage in southern Wales. Her PhD was awarded in 1977 for her thesis "Sex and generation: a study of the process and ritual of courtship and wedding in a South Wales town". In the meantime, she became active in the Women's liberation movement. She took part in a project under Christine Delphy in Paris (1975–77), which examined the ways that women were oppressed in the domestic sphere, a process that encouraged and helped to refine her materialist–feminist critique of the family. She also helped to edit Trouble and Strife, a feminist journal, and helped to found the Women’s Research and Resources Centre (later renamed the Feminist Library) in London in 1975. The next year, she was appointed to a lectureship in sociology at the Institute of Education, part of the University of London. There, she established the Centre for Research on Education and Gender in 1984, which explored issues facing women and girls during schooling and university education. Between 1980 and 1983, she was seconded to the Open University to oversee the creation of its women's studies course. Aside from a number of visiting professorships, Leonard remained at the Institute of Education for the rest of her career, which culminated in her appointment in 1998 as Professor of Sociology. She retired in 2007 but remained there as an emeritus professor. She was elected an Academician of the Academy of Social Sciences in 2006 and a fellow of the Society for Research in Higher Education two years later.

Leonard, whose marriage to Rodney Barker ended in divorce in 1981 but produced three children, died of cancer on 27 November 2010.

== Publications ==
- (Co-edited with Sheila Allen) Sexual Divisions and Society: Process and Change (Routledge, 1976).
- (Co-authored with Sheila Allen) Dependence and Exploitation in Work and Marriage (Longman, 1976).
- Sex and Generation: A Study of Courtship and Weddings (Tavistock Publications, 1982).
- (Co-edited with Sheila Allen) Sexual Divisions Revisited (Macmillan, 1991).
- (Co-authored with Christine Delphy) Familiar Exploitation: A New Analysis of Marriage in Contemporary Western Societies (Wiley, 1992).
- (Co-edited with Lisa Adkins) Sex in Question: French Materialist Feminism, Gender and Society: Feminist Perspectives series (Taylor & Francis, 1996).
- A Woman's Guide to Doctoral Studies (Open University Press, 2001).
- (Co-authored with Louise Morley and Miriam David) "Quality and Equality in British PhD Assessment", Quality Assurance in Education, vol. 11, no. 2 (2003), pp. 64–72.

== Archives ==
- The Bishopsgate Institute holds a collection of Leonard's papers, books, press cuttings, notes, and publications.
