= Maryanne Dever =

Australian journal editor and feminist literary researcher

Academic background
- Education: University of Queensland University of Sydney
- Alma mater: University of Sydney

Academic work
- Institutions: Western Sydney University

Maryanne Dever is an Australian academic whose research focuses on feminist literary and archival studies. She is best known for her work on literary collaboration, intimate archives, and questions of archival materiality in the age of the digital.

== Education ==
Dever completed a BA (Hons) at the University of Queensland, an MA (Hons), followed by a PhD, at the University of Sydney.

== Career ==
She is Deputy Vice-Chancellor (Education and Students) at Western Sydney University. She was previously Pro Vice-Chancellor (Education and Digital) at the Australian National University in Canberra. She has also worked at the University of Technology Sydney, Monash University, the University of Hong Kong and the University of Sydney. At Monash University she was Director of the Centre for Women's Studies and Gender Research. She has held visiting positions at McGill University, the National Library of Australia, University College London and the University of Tampere.

From 2015 to 2024 Dever was joint editor-in-chief with Lisa Adkins of the academic journal, Australian Feminist Studies.

== Selected works ==
- Dever, Maryanne, ed. (1994), Wallflowers and witches : women and culture in Australia 1910–1945, University of Queensland Press, ISBN 978-0-7022-2607-6
- Dever, Maryanne, ed. (1995), M. Barnard Eldershaw: Plaque with laurel, essays, reviews & correspondence, University of Queensland Press, ISBN 978-0-7022-2724-0
- Dever, Maryanne; Taylor, Anthea; Adkins, Lisa, eds. (10 September 2018), Germaine Greer : essays on a feminist figure, Routledge/Taylor & Francis Group (published 2019), ISBN 978-1-138-33722-0
- Dever, Maryanne, ed. (17 September 2018), Archives and new modes of feminist research, Routledge (published 2019), ISBN 978-1-138-33795-4
- Parkins, Ilya; Dever, Maryanne, eds. (12 February 2020), Fashion: new feminist essays, Routledge (published 2020), ISBN 978-0-367-43688-9
- Dever, Maryanne (2019), Paper, materiality and the archived page, Palgrave Macmillan, ISBN 978-1-137-49885-4
- Dever, Maryanne, ed. (2023), New feminist research ethics, Routledge, ISBN 978-1-032-45207-4
