= Australian Feminist Studies =

- Discipline: Feminist studies
- Language: English
- Edited by: Lisa Adkins and Maryanne Dever

Publication details
- History: 1985-present
- Publisher: Routledge
- Frequency: Quarterly
- Open access: Hybrid
- Impact factor: 0.81 (2016)

Standard abbreviations
- ISO 4: Aust. Fem. Stud.

Indexing
- CODEN: AFSTFJ
- ISSN: 0816-4649 (print); 1465-3303 (web)
- LCCN: 89646678
- OCLC no.: 41979718

Links
- Journal homepage; Online access; Online archive

Australian Feminist Studies is a quarterly peer-reviewed academic journal covering feminist studies. It was established in 1985 and is published by Routledge. The founding editor-in-chief was Susan Magarey (University of Adelaide). She was succeeded as editor by Mary Spongberg (University of Technology Sydney). The current editors are Lisa Adkins (University of Sydney) and Maryanne Dever (The Australian National University ). The journal was formerly published twice a year.

== Abstracting and indexing ==
The journal is abstracted and indexed in:

- America: History and Life
- Australian Education Index
- British Humanities Index
- EBSCOhost
- Current Contents/Social and Behavioural Sciences
- Social Sciences Citation Index
- Scopus
- International Bibliography of the Social Sciences
- Sociological Abstracts
- Studies in Women and Gender Abstracts

According to the Journal Citation Reports, the journal has a 2015 impact factor of 0.500, ranking it 29th out of 40 journals in the category "Women's Studies".

== See also ==
- Feminist theory
- Gender studies
- List of women's studies journals
- Women's liberation movement
- Women's studies
