= Sheila Allen (sociologist) =

English sociologist and academic

Sheila Allen (née McKenny; 2 November 1930 – 16 January 2009) was an English sociologist and academic. She was Professor of Sociology at the University of Bradford from 1972 to 1999, and served as president of the British Sociological Association from 1975 to 1977.

== Career ==
The daughter of John and Marjorie McKenny, Sheila McKenny was born on 2 November 1930 in Gilberdyke, East Yorkshire, but grew up in Lincolnshire. Her father was chronically unemployed and the family struggled financially during the Great Depression and the Second World War. Her mother valued education and Sheila won a scholarship at the girls' grammar school in Sleaford (Kesteven and Sleaford High School); she was the first in her family to attend a grammar school (her parents had been unable to afford her brother's uniform when he won a place at the boys' equivalent), and went from there to the London School of Economics to read sociology – a venture her father considered "pointless" for a woman but which her mother also encouraged. After graduating, she completed a postgraduate course in anthropology based on fieldwork in south-east Asia. She was a senior research assistant for a time, and then joined the University of Leicester as a lecturer in sociology in 1961. Five years later, she moved to the University of Bradford to take up a senior lectureship. She was promoted to a readership there in 1971, and then in 1972 became the university's first female professor when she was appointed to the chair in Sociology. She stayed in the position until retiring in 1999, after which she remained at Bradford as an emeritus professor. Outside of university, she was president of the British Sociological Association from 1975 to 1977.

McKenny married twice, firstly to Tim Williams in 1953; they divorced, and she married Vic Allen in 1968. They subsequently divorced, but with him she had two daughters, Lucy and Sophie. She and Allen kept an open house at times, hosting a diverse range of guests from intellectuals to trade unionists. In later life, she suffered from a variety of health problems, and died on 16 January 2009.

== Research ==
From a personal perspective, McKenny (who went by her married name Allen after 1968) became interested in sociology as a means of understanding and improving the world. The Independent described her as "an uncompromising intellectual, feminist, and socialist, and an impressive role model for generations of students who were taught, mentored, challenged, argued with and supported by her. For those in authority, she was often 'an impossible woman' precisely because she refused to be bullied and intimidated. She understood the importance of power relations and divisions of every sort in society – ethnicity, class, gender, disability." She wrote widely on issues of race, class and gender, established Bradford's Ethnicity and Social Policy Research Centre, and was director of the Youth and Work: Differential Ethnic Experience project there. She was especially interested in the intersections of race and gender and was probably the first academic to write about institutional racism in a British context (in a 1973 article); she was also interested in the difficulties faced by migrant single women who had to deal with British institutions run by and set up for men. In the mid-1970s, she established one of the earliest women's studies masters courses, and also established evening part-time courses at Bradford, to help people from disadvantaged backgrounds attend university. In 1974, she organised (with Diana Leonard) the first British Sociological Association conference on sexual divisions within society.

== Selected publications ==
- New Minorities, Old Conflict: Asian and West Indian Migrants in Britain (Random House, 1971).
- "The Institutionalization of Racism", Race & Class, vol. 15, no. 1 (1973), pp. 99–106.
- (Co-edited with Diana Leonard) Sexual Divisions and Society: Process and Change (Routledge, 1976).
- (Co-authored with Diana Leonard) Dependence and Exploitation in Work and Marriage (Longman, 1976).
- (Co-authored with Stuart Bentley and Joanna Bornat) Work, Race and Immigration (University of Bradford, 1977).
- (Co-edited with Brian Burkett) The Sociology of Economic Life (1991).

Academic offices
Preceded by John Eldridge	Chair in Sociology, University of Bradford; 1972–1999	Succeeded by ??
Preceded by Peter Worsley	President, British Sociological Association; 1975–1977	Succeeded by Keith Kelsall
