= Electoral results for the district of Chaffey =

South Australian district election results

This is a list of electoral results for the Electoral district of Chaffey in South Australian state elections.

== Members for Chaffey ==
Member	Party	Term
William MacGillivray	Independent	1938–1956
Harold King	Liberal and Country	1956–1962
Reg Curren	Labor	1962–1968
Peter Arnold	Liberal and Country	1968–1970
Reg Curren	Labor	1970–1973
Peter Arnold	Liberal and Country	1973–1973
Peter Arnold	Liberal	1973–1993
Kent Andrew	Liberal	1993–1997
Karlene Maywald	Nationals SA	1997–2010
Tim Whetstone	Liberal	2010–present

== Election results ==
=== Elections in the 2020s ===
==== 2026 ====
2026 South Australian state election: Chaffey
Party	Candidate	Votes	%	±%
Liberal	Tim Whetstone	7,839	35.4	−19.2
One Nation	Jenny Troeth	7,506	33.9	+24.0
Labor	Oscar Harding	3,420	15.4	−4.5
Greens	Alice Kuersch	1,018	4.6	−1.5
Independent	Jason Perrin	842	3.8	+3.8
Australian Family	Tim Oakley	593	2.7	+2.7
Legalise Cannabis	Jeff Knipe	550	2.5	+2.5
National	Imelda Adamson Agars	190	0.9	−4.9
Independent	Jakob Gamertsfelder	183	0.8	+0.8
Total formal votes		22,141	94.2	−1.3
Informal votes		1,367	5.8	+1.3
Turnout		23,508	88.1	−1.4
Two-party-preferred result
Liberal	Tim Whetstone	15,182	68.6	+1.4
Labor	Oscar Harding	6,959	31.4	−1.4
Two-candidate-preferred result
Liberal	Tim Whetstone	12,392	56.0	−11.2
One Nation	Jenny Troeth	9,749	44.0	+44.0
Liberal hold				

==== 2022 ====
2022 South Australian state election: Chaffey
Party	Candidate	Votes	%	±%
Liberal	Tim Whetstone	12,050	54.6	+7.6
Labor	Joanne Sutton	4,395	19.9	+1.2
One Nation	Sab Feleppa	2,180	9.9	+9.9
Greens	Trevor Schloithe	1,334	6.0	+4.0
National	Damien Buijs	1,267	5.7	+5.7
Family First	Mathew Francis	831	3.8	+3.8
Total formal votes		22,057	95.5	
Informal votes		1,034	4.5	
Turnout		23,091	89.5	
Two-party-preferred result
Liberal	Tim Whetstone	14,820	67.2	−0.8
Labor	Joanne Sutton	7,237	32.8	+0.8
Liberal hold		Swing	−0.8	

Distribution of preferences: Chaffey
Party	Candidate	Votes	Round 1		Round 2		Round 3		Round 4	
Party	Candidate	Votes	Dist.	Total	Dist.	Total	Dist.	Total	Dist.	Total
Quota (50% + 1)		11,029								
Liberal	Tim Whetstone	12,050	+188	12,238	+239	12,477	+837	13,314	+1,506	14,820
Labor	Joanne Sutton	4,395	+159	4,554	+803	5,357	+363	5,720	+1,517	7,237
One Nation	Sab Feleppa	2,180	+142	2,322	+204	2,526	+497	3,023	Excluded	
Greens	Trevor Schloithe	1,334	+114	1,448	Excluded					
National	Damien Buijs	1,267	+228	1,495	+202	1,697	Excluded			
Family First	Mathew Francis	831	Excluded							

=== Elections in the 2010s ===
2018 South Australian state election: Chaffey
Party	Candidate	Votes	%	±%
Liberal	Tim Whetstone	9,489	46.1	−17.6
SA Best	Michelle Campbell	5,136	24.9	+24.9
Labor	Sim Singh-Malhi	3,972	19.3	+1.7
Conservatives	Trevor Scott	1,366	6.6	−6.6
Greens	Philip Pointer	404	2.0	−3.6
Dignity	Richard Challis	229	1.1	+1.1
Total formal votes		20,596	95.7	−0.9
Informal votes		935	4.3	+0.9
Turnout		21,531	91.6	−1.3
Two-party-preferred result
Liberal	Tim Whetstone	13,857	67.3	−6.7
Labor	Sim Singh-Malhi	6,739	32.7	+6.7
Two-candidate-preferred result
Liberal	Tim Whetstone	12,059	58.6	−15.4
SA Best	Michelle Campbell	8,537	41.5	+41.5
Liberal hold				

2014 South Australian state election: Chaffey
Party	Candidate	Votes	%	±%
Liberal	Tim Whetstone	14,196	64.8	+17.1
Labor	Mahanbir Grewal	3,615	16.5	+9.1
Family First	Yvonne Zeppel	2,891	13.2	+5.7
Greens	Jason Garrood	1,199	5.5	+3.3
Total formal votes		21,901	96.6	−0.3
Informal votes		767	3.4	+0.3
Turnout		22,668	92.2	−1.4
Two-party-preferred result
Liberal	Tim Whetstone	16,454	75.1	−3.3
Labor	Mahanbir Grewal	5,447	24.9	+3.3
Liberal hold		Swing	N/A	

2010 South Australian state election: Chaffey
Party	Candidate	Votes	%	±%
Liberal	Tim Whetstone	8,958	44.7	+15.6
National	Karlene Maywald	7,310	36.5	−15.3
Family First	Jack Papageorgiou	1,535	7.7	+2.7
Labor	Roly Telfer	1,439	7.2	−3.1
Independent	David Peake	398	2.0	+2.0
Greens	James Jordan	395	2.0	−0.5
Total formal votes		20,035	96.8	
Informal votes		640	3.2	
Turnout		20,675	93.6	
Two-party-preferred result
Liberal	Tim Whetstone	15,580	77.8	+6.0
Labor	Roly Telfer	4,455	22.2	−6.0
Two-candidate-preferred result
Liberal	Tim Whetstone	10,770	53.8	+20.0
National	Karlene Maywald	9,265	46.2	−20.0
Liberal gain from National		Swing	+20.0	

=== Elections in the 2000s ===
2006 South Australian state election: Chaffey
Party	Candidate	Votes	%	±%
National	Karlene Maywald	10,358	53.2	+4.0
Liberal	Anna Baric	5,498	28.2	−3.2
Labor	Robert Potter	1,914	9.8	−2.2
Family First	Rikki Lambert	970	5.0	+5.0
Greens	Pam Kelly	475	2.4	+2.4
Democrats	Graham McNaughton	271	1.4	−2.6
Total formal votes		19,486	96.5	−1.0
Informal votes		699	3.5	+1.0
Turnout		20,185	92.3	−1.2
Two-party-preferred result
Liberal	Anna Baric	13,994	71.8	
Labor	Robert Potter	5,492	28.2	
Two-candidate-preferred result
National	Karlene Maywald	13,101	67.2	+3.2
Liberal	Anna Baric	6,385	32.8	−3.2
National hold		Swing	+3.2	

2002 South Australian state election: Chaffey
Party	Candidate	Votes	%	±%
National	Karlene Maywald	9,929	49.2	+12.4
Liberal	Kent Andrew	6,337	31.4	−10.5
Labor	Waluwe Simpson-Lyttle	2,419	12.0	−2.0
Democrats	Graham McNaughton	800	4.0	−3.2
One Nation	Shirley Faulkner	676	3.4	+3.4
Total formal votes		20,161	97.5	
Informal votes		526	2.5	
Turnout		20,687	93.5	
Two-party-preferred result
National	Karlene Maywald	12,899	64.0	+11.5
Liberal	Kent Andrew	7,262	36.0	−11.5
National hold		Swing	+11.5	

=== Elections in the 1990s ===
1997 South Australian state election: Chaffey
Party	Candidate	Votes	%	±%
Liberal	Kent Andrew	8,133	41.7	+0.6
National	Karlene Maywald	7,242	37.1	+13.5
Labor	Michael Subacius	2,734	14.0	+5.5
Democrats	Karrie Lannstrom	1,399	7.2	+5.7
Total formal votes		19,508	97.2	+0.5
Informal votes		564	2.8	−0.5
Turnout		20,072	91.4	
Two-party-preferred result
Liberal	Kent Andrew	13,841	71.0	−8.0
Labor	Michael Subacius	5,667	29.0	+8.0
Two-candidate-preferred result
National	Karlene Maywald	10,252	52.6	+8.9
Liberal	Kent Andrew	9,256	47.4	−8.9
National gain from Liberal		Swing	+8.9	

1993 South Australian state election: Chaffey
Party	Candidate	Votes	%	±%
Liberal	Kent Andrew	8,109	41.1	−17.6
National	Peter McFarlane	4,668	23.7	+23.7
Independent	Philip Lorimer	4,464	22.6	+22.6
Labor	Petar Zdravkovski	1,678	8.5	−15.7
Independent	Shirley Faulkner	521	2.6	+2.6
Democrats	Eric Mack	282	1.4	−10.1
Total formal votes		19,722	96.7	−0.5
Informal votes		672	3.3	+0.5
Turnout		20,394	92.9	
Two-party-preferred result
Liberal	Kent Andrew	15,579	79.0	+8.3
Labor	Petar Zdravkovski	4,143	21.0	−8.3
Two-candidate-preferred result
Liberal	Kent Andrew	11,105	56.3	−14.4
National	Peter McFarlane	8,617	43.7	+43.7
Liberal hold		Swing	N/A	

=== Elections in the 1980s ===
1989 South Australian state election: Chaffey
Party	Candidate	Votes	%	±%
Liberal	Peter Arnold	10,716	58.6	−4.9
Labor	William Parsons	4,427	24.2	−7.3
Democrats	Mark Lobban	2,117	11.6	+6.7
Independent	Rowland Beech	1,026	5.6	+5.6
Total formal votes		18,286	97.2	−0.4
Informal votes		535	2.8	+0.4
Turnout		18,821	92.0	+2.1
Two-party-preferred result
Liberal	Peter Arnold	12,921	70.7	+4.4
Labor	William Parsons	12,921	29.3	−4.4
Liberal hold		Swing	+4.4	

1985 South Australian state election: Chaffey
Party	Candidate	Votes	%	±%
Liberal	Peter Arnold	10,937	63.5	+1.5
Labor	Bill Parsons	5,428	31.5	+1.5
Democrats	Rilda Sharp	847	4.9	−3.1
Total formal votes		17,212	97.6	
Informal votes		427	2.4	
Turnout		17,639	89.9	
Two-party-preferred result
Liberal	Peter Arnold	11,415	66.3	+0.3
Labor	Bill Parsons	5,797	33.7	−0.3
Liberal hold		Swing	+0.3	

1982 South Australian state election: Chaffey
Party	Candidate	Votes	%	±%
Liberal	Peter Arnold	10,219	61.5	+0.4
Labor	Roland Telfer	5,109	30.7	−2.8
Democrats	Michael Elliott	1,291	7.8	+2.4
Total formal votes		16,619	94.5	−1.1
Informal votes		975	5.5	+1.1
Turnout		17,594	92.0	−2.3
Two-party-preferred result
Liberal	Peter Arnold	10,865	65.4	+1.6
Labor	Roland Telfer	5,754	34.6	−1.6
Liberal hold		Swing	+1.6	

=== Elections in the 1970s ===
1979 South Australian state election: Chaffey
Party	Candidate	Votes	%	±%
Liberal	Peter Arnold	9,970	61.1	+1.5
Labor	Ronald Telfer	5,455	33.5	−6.9
Democrats	Rowland Beech	876	5.4	+5.4
Total formal votes		16,301	95.6	−1.9
Informal votes		748	4.4	+1.9
Turnout		17,049	94.3	+0.9
Two-party-preferred result
Liberal	Peter Arnold	10,408	63.8	+4.2
Labor	Ronald Telfer	5,893	36.2	−4.2
Liberal hold		Swing	+4.2	

1977 South Australian state election: Chaffey
Party	Candidate	Votes	%	±%
Liberal	Peter Arnold	9,522	59.6	+7.5
Labor	John Howe	6,445	40.4	+11.0
Total formal votes		15,967	97.5	
Informal votes		401	2.5	
Turnout		16,368	93.4	
Liberal hold		Swing	−8.2	

1975 South Australian state election: Chaffey
Party	Candidate	Votes	%	±%
Liberal	Peter Arnold	6,281	55.9	+2.4
Labor	John Hooper	3,562	31.7	−14.8
Liberal Movement	Jack Seekamp	1,391	12.4	+12.4
Total formal votes		11,234	96.4	−1.4
Informal votes		418	3.6	+1.4
Turnout		11,652	93.8	−1.4
Two-party-preferred result
Liberal	Peter Arnold	7,538	67.1	+13.5
Labor	John Hooper	3,696	32.9	−13.5
Liberal hold		Swing	+13.5	

1973 South Australian state election: Chaffey
Party	Candidate	Votes	%	±%
Liberal and Country	Peter Arnold	5,561	53.5	+13.4
Labor	Reg Curren	4,830	46.5	+2.2
Total formal votes		10,391	97.8	−0.5
Informal votes		233	2.2	+0.5
Turnout		10,624	95.2	−1.1
Liberal and Country gain from Labor		Swing	+3.7	

1970 South Australian state election: Chaffey
Party	Candidate	Votes	%	±%
Labor	Reg Curren	4,296	44.3	
Liberal and Country	Peter Arnold	3,891	40.1	
National	Geoffrey Blight	1,353	14.0	
Independent	Patrick Barry	154	1.6	
Total formal votes		9,694	98.3	
Informal votes		167	1.7	
Turnout		9,861	96.3	
Two-party-preferred result
Labor	Reg Curren	4,870	50.2	
Liberal and Country	Peter Arnold	4,824	49.8	
Labor gain from Liberal and Country		Swing		

=== Elections in the 1960s ===
1968 South Australian state election: Chaffey
Party	Candidate	Votes	%	±%
Liberal and Country	Peter Arnold	3,392	47.4	+0.1
Labor	Reg Curren	3,073	42.9	−5.7
National	James Trevor	367	5.1	+5.1
Independent	Allan Anderson	329	4.6	+4.6
Total formal votes		7,161	97.3	−0.1
Informal votes		197	2.7	+0.1
Turnout		7,358	93.4	−2.5
Two-party-preferred result
Liberal and Country	Peter Arnold	4,008	56.0	+6.7
Labor	Reg Curren	3,153	44.0	−6.7
Liberal and Country gain from Labor		Swing	+6.7	

1965 South Australian state election: Chaffey
Party	Candidate	Votes	%	±%
Labor	Reg Curren	3,449	48.6	−1.5
Liberal and Country	Harold King	3,356	47.3	−2.6
Independent	Herbert Wilson	169	2.4	+2.4
Democratic Labor	William Ahern	124	1.8	+1.8
Total formal votes		7,098	97.4	−0.4
Informal votes		189	2.6	+0.4
Turnout		7,287	95.9	0.0
Two-party-preferred result
Labor	Reg Curren	3,599	50.7	+0.6
Liberal and Country	Harold King	3,499	49.3	−0.6
Labor hold		Swing	+0.6	

1962 South Australian state election: Chaffey
Party	Candidate	Votes	%	±%
Labor	Reg Curren	3,519	50.1	+19.6
Liberal and Country	Harold King	3,504	49.9	+5.4
Total formal votes		7,023	97.8	−0.6
Informal votes		156	2.2	+0.6
Turnout		7,179	95.9	+0.1
Labor gain from Liberal and Country		Swing	+8.3	
