= Results of the 1959 South Australian state election (House of Assembly) =

South Australian state election, 7 March 1959 House of Assembly << 1956–1962 >>
Enrolled voters	497,456				
Votes cast	400,531		Turnout	93.95%	+0.05%
Informal votes	11,593		Informal	2.89%	+0.50%
Summary of votes by party
Party	Primary votes	%	Swing	Seats	Change
Labor	191,933	49.35%	+1.98%	17	+ 2
Liberal and Country	143,710	36.95%	+0.26%	20	– 1
Democratic Labor	21,984	5.65%	–1.79%	0	± 0
Communist	5,505	1.42%	+0.26%	0	± 0
Independent	25,806	6.63%	–0.71%	2	– 1
Total	388,938			39	
Two-party-preferred
Liberal and Country		50.30%	–1.00%		
Labor		49.70%	+1.00%		

This is a list of House of Assembly results for the 1959 South Australian state election.

== Results by electoral district ==
=== Adelaide ===
1959 South Australian state election: Adelaide
Party	Candidate	Votes	%	±%
Labor	Sam Lawn	12,861	73.0	−3.8
Democratic Labor	James O'Sullivan	3,086	17.5	+0.8
Communist	Elliott Johnston	1,677	9.5	+2.9
Total formal votes		17,624	94.2	−1.0
Informal votes		1,078	5.8	+1.0
Turnout		18,702	89.7	−2.3
Two-candidate-preferred result
Labor	Sam Lawn		80.1	−1.6
Democratic Labor	James O'Sullivan		19.9	+1.6
Labor hold		Swing	−1.6	

- Two candidate preferred vote was estimated.

=== Albert ===
1959 South Australian state election: Albert
Party	Candidate	Votes	%	±%
Liberal and Country	Bill Nankivell	unopposed		
Liberal and Country hold		Swing		

=== Alexandra ===
1959 South Australian state election: Alexandra
Party	Candidate	Votes	%	±%
Liberal and Country	David Brookman	unopposed		
Liberal and Country hold		Swing		

=== Angas ===
1959 South Australian state election: Angas
Party	Candidate	Votes	%	±%
Liberal and Country	Berthold Teusner	4,081	64.7	−12.9
Labor	Harley Ladd	2,229	35.3	+35.3
Total formal votes		6,310	98.8	+1.1
Informal votes		74	1.2	−1.1
Turnout		6,384	96.8	+1.1
Liberal and Country hold		Swing	N/A	

=== Barossa ===
1959 South Australian state election: Barossa
Party	Candidate	Votes	%	±%
Liberal and Country	Condor Laucke	unopposed		
Liberal and Country hold		Swing		

=== Burnside ===
1959 South Australian state election: Burnside
Party	Candidate	Votes	%	±%
Liberal and Country	Joyce Steele	13,228	57.1	−42.9
Independent	John Parkinson	3,236	14.0	+14.0
Democratic Labor	Kenneth Constable	3,089	13.3	+13.3
Independent	Keith Gibbs	2,756	11.9	+11.9
Independent	Frank Rieck	877	3.8	+3.8
Total formal votes		23,186	94.1	
Informal votes		1,448	5.9	
Turnout		24,634	93.7	
Liberal and Country hold		Swing	N/A	

- Preferences were not distributed.

=== Burra ===
1959 South Australian state election: Burra
Party	Candidate	Votes	%	±%
Independent	Percy Quirke	3,047	52.1	+0.9
Liberal and Country	Gordon Gilfillan	2,806	47.9	−0.9
Total formal votes		5,853	98.7	−0.2
Informal votes		75	1.3	+0.2
Turnout		5,928	95.9	+0.8
Independent hold		Swing	+0.9	

=== Chaffey ===
1959 South Australian state election: Chaffey
Party	Candidate	Votes	%	±%
Liberal and Country	Harold King	3,014	44.5	+10.6
Labor	Robert Curren	2,069	30.5	+0.8
Independent	William MacGillivray	1,691	25.0	−10.9
Total formal votes		6,774	98.4	+1.0
Informal votes		108	1.6	−1.0
Turnout		6,882	95.8	+0.1
Two-party-preferred result
Liberal and Country	Harold King	3,942	58.2	+3.0
Labor	Robert Curren	2,832	41.8	+41.8
Liberal and Country hold		Swing	N/A	

=== Edwardstown ===
1959 South Australian state election: Edwardstown
Party	Candidate	Votes	%	±%
Labor	Frank Walsh	13,894	56.7	−17.6
Liberal and Country	May Mills	8,726	35.6	+35.6
Democratic Labor	Daniel Faulkner	1,895	7.7	−18.0
Total formal votes		24,515	98.0	+2.0
Informal votes		503	2.0	−2.0
Turnout		25,018	94.4	+0.8
Two-party-preferred result
Labor	Frank Walsh		57.8	−16.5
Liberal and Country	May Mills		42.2	+42.2
Labor hold		Swing	N/A	

- Two party preferred vote was estimated.

=== Enfield ===
1959 South Australian state election: Enfield
Party	Candidate	Votes	%	±%
Labor	Jack Jennings	17,222	68.3	+1.1
Independent	Thomas Ellis	5,323	21.1	+21.1
Democratic Labor	Edward Timlin	2,023	8.0	+3.2
Communist	Alan Miller	655	2.6	+2.6
Total formal votes		25,223	95.8	−2.4
Informal votes		1,091	4.2	+2.4
Turnout		26,314	93.9	0.0
Labor hold		Swing	N/A	

- Preferences were not distributed.

=== Eyre ===
1959 South Australian state election: Eyre
Party	Candidate	Votes	%	±%
Liberal and Country	George Bockelberg	unopposed		
Liberal and Country hold		Swing		

=== Flinders ===
1959 South Australian state election: Flinders
Party	Candidate	Votes	%	±%
Liberal and Country	Glen Pearson	3,806	60.1	−39.9
Labor	Percy Baillie	2,527	39.9	+39.9
Total formal votes		6,333	98.8	
Informal votes		74	1.2	
Turnout		6,407	95.1	
Liberal and Country hold		Swing	N/A	

=== Frome ===
1959 South Australian state election: Frome
Party	Candidate	Votes	%	±%
Labor	Mick O'Halloran	2,711	51.6	−1.0
Liberal and Country	Maxwell Hams	2,219	42.2	+6.0
Democratic Labor	Michael Hoare	326	6.2	−5.0
Total formal votes		5,256	98.6	0.0
Informal votes		76	1.4	0.0
Turnout		5,332	90.9	+1.9
Two-party-preferred result
Labor	Mick O'Halloran		52.5	−1.8
Liberal and Country	Maxwell Hams		47.5	+1.8
Labor hold		Swing	−1.8	

- Two party preferred vote was estimated.

=== Gawler ===
1959 South Australian state election: Gawler
Party	Candidate	Votes	%	±%
Labor	John Clark	8,120	67.7	−32.3
Liberal and Country	Jean Davis	3,871	32.3	+32.3
Total formal votes		11,991	97.2	
Informal votes		347	2.8	
Turnout		12,338	93.6	
Labor hold		Swing	N/A	

=== Glenelg ===
1959 South Australian state election: Glenelg
Party	Candidate	Votes	%	±%
Liberal and Country	Baden Pattinson	14,735	55.7	+2.1
Labor	Richard Clifford	9,641	36.4	−4.9
Democratic Labor	Nathaniel Bishop	2,082	7.9	+2.8
Total formal votes		26,458	98.0	−0.5
Informal votes		528	2.0	+0.5
Turnout		26,986	93.9	−0.5
Two-party-preferred result
Liberal and Country	Baden Pattinson		62.4	+4.4
Labor	Richard Clifford		37.6	−4.4
Liberal and Country hold		Swing	+4.4	

- Two party preferred vote was estimated.

=== Gouger ===
1959 South Australian state election: Gouger
Party	Candidate	Votes	%	±%
Liberal and Country	Steele Hall	4,376	72.3	+1.8
Independent	Thomas Freebairn	854	14.1	+14.1
Independent	Hector Henstridge	824	13.6	−15.9
Total formal votes		6,054	96.6	−0.2
Informal votes		212	3.4	+0.2
Turnout		6,266	96.6	+1.4
Liberal and Country hold		Swing	N/A	

- Preferences were not distributed.

=== Gumeracha ===
1959 South Australian state election: Gumeracha
Party	Candidate	Votes	%	±%
Liberal and Country	Thomas Playford	4,781	73.4	−15.2
Labor	Ernie Crimes	1,333	20.5	+20.5
Independent	Charles Coffey	404	6.2	+6.2
Total formal votes		6,518	98.4	+2.3
Informal votes		107	1.6	−2.3
Turnout		6,625	95.6	+0.8
Two-party-preferred result
Liberal and Country	Thomas Playford		76.4	−12.2
Labor	Ernie Crimes		23.6	+23.6
Liberal and Country hold		Swing	N/A	

- Two party preferred vote was estimated.

=== Hindmarsh ===
1959 South Australian state election: Hindmarsh
Party	Candidate	Votes	%	±%
Labor	Cyril Hutchens	unopposed		
Labor hold		Swing		

=== Light ===
1959 South Australian state election: Light
Party	Candidate	Votes	%	±%
Liberal and Country	George Hambour	4,252	71.8	−28.2
Labor	Donald MacLeod	1,674	28.2	+28.2
Total formal votes		5,926	98.6	
Informal votes		86	1.4	
Turnout		6,012	95.4	
Liberal and Country hold		Swing	N/A	

=== Millicent ===
1959 South Australian state election: Millicent
Party	Candidate	Votes	%	±%
Labor	Jim Corcoran	3,409	54.5	+2.2
Liberal and Country	William Gordon	2,849	45.5	−2.2
Total formal votes		6,258	99.2	−0.1
Informal votes		52	0.8	+0.1
Turnout		6,310	96.1	+0.8
Labor hold		Swing	+2.2	

=== Mitcham ===
1959 South Australian state election: Mitcham
Party	Candidate	Votes	%	±%
Liberal and Country	Robin Millhouse	13,441	67.2	−32.8
Labor	Sylvester Byrne	5,852	29.2	+29.2
Democratic Labor	Patrick McCabe	724	3.6	+3.6
Total formal votes		20,017	98.2	
Informal votes		373	1.8	
Turnout		20,390	93.4	
Two-party-preferred result
Liberal and Country	Robin Millhouse		70.2	
Labor	Sylvester Byrne		29.8	
Liberal and Country hold		Swing	N/A	

- The two party preferred vote was estimated.

=== Mount Gambier ===
1959 South Australian state election: Mount Gambier
Party	Candidate	Votes	%	±%
Labor	Ron Ralston	4,651	58.3	+14.4
Liberal and Country	Herbert Ashby	3,327	41.7	+41.7
Total formal votes		7,978	99.3	+0.8
Informal votes		57	0.7	−0.8
Turnout		8,035	95.8	+0.7
Labor gain from Independent		Swing	N/A	

=== Murray ===
1959 South Australian state election: Murray
Party	Candidate	Votes	%	±%
Labor	Gabe Bywaters	4,576	64.8	+13.4
Liberal and Country	Arnold Royal	2,353	33.3	−15.3
Democratic Labor	Susan Critchley	130	1.8	+1.8
Total formal votes		7,059	98.6	+0.1
Informal votes		101	1.4	−0.1
Turnout		7,160	96.3	+0.2
Two-party-preferred result
Labor	Gabe Bywaters		65.1	+13.7
Liberal and Country	Arnold Royal		34.9	−13.7
Labor hold		Swing	+13.7	

- Two party preferred vote was estimated.

=== Norwood ===
1959 South Australian state election: Norwood
Party	Candidate	Votes	%	±%
Labor	Don Dunstan	10,723	54.1	−2.4
Liberal and Country	Trevor Butcher	7,899	39.9	+0.6
Democratic Labor	Lance Bishop	1,185	6.0	+1.8
Total formal votes		19,807	97.6	−0.8
Informal votes		487	2.4	+0.8
Turnout		20,294	94.3	+0.5
Two-party-preferred result
Labor	Don Dunstan		55.0	−2.2
Liberal and Country	Trevor Butcher		45.0	+2.2
Labor hold		Swing	−2.2	

- Two party preferred vote was estimated.

=== Onkaparinga ===
1959 South Australian state election: Onkaparinga
Party	Candidate	Votes	%	±%
Liberal and Country	Howard Shannon	3,954	63.3	−6.8
Labor	Cyril Hasse	2,292	36.7	+36.7
Total formal votes		6,246	97.9	+2.2
Informal votes		135	2.1	−2.2
Turnout		6,381	94.6	+0.5
Liberal and Country hold		Swing	N/A	

=== Port Adelaide ===
1959 South Australian state election: Port Adelaide
Party	Candidate	Votes	%	±%
Labor	John Ryan	16,958	80.2	+2.4
Democratic Labor	Gerald Shinnick	2,846	13.5	−3.0
Communist	James Moss	1,351	6.4	+0.7
Total formal votes		21,155	94.8	−1.0
Informal votes		1,164	5.2	+1.0
Turnout		22,319	94.2	+0.5
Two-candidate-preferred result
Labor	John Ryan		84.9	+2.8
Democratic Labor	Gerald Shinnick		15.1	−2.8
Labor hold		Swing	+2.8	

- Two candidate preferred vote was estimated.

=== Port Pirie ===
1959 South Australian state election: Port Pirie
Party	Candidate	Votes	%	±%
Labor	Dave McKee	3,757	59.1	−40.9
Independent	Henry Welch	2,315	36.4	+36.4
Communist	Charles McCaffrey	283	4.5	+4.5
Total formal votes		6,355	97.9	
Informal votes		139	2.1	
Turnout		6,494	95.5	
Labor hold		Swing	N/A	

- Preferences were not distributed.

=== Ridley ===
1959 South Australian state election: Ridley
Party	Candidate	Votes	%	±%
Independent	Tom Stott	2,735	42.7	0.0
Liberal and Country	Roy Glatz	2,412	37.7	+4.5
Labor	Arnold Busbridge	1,257	19.6	−4.5
Total formal votes		9,404	99.0	0.0
Informal votes		64	1.0	0.0
Turnout		6,468	96.8	−0.2
Two-candidate-preferred result
Independent	Tom Stott	3,632	56.7	−4.3
Liberal and Country	Roy Glatz	2,772	43.3	+4.3
Independent hold		Swing	−4.3	

=== Rocky River ===
1959 South Australian state election: Rocky River
Party	Candidate	Votes	%	±%
Liberal and Country	James Heaslip	unopposed		
Liberal and Country hold		Swing		

=== Semaphore ===
1959 South Australian state election: Semaphore
Party	Candidate	Votes	%	±%
Labor	Harold Tapping	18,246	92.2	−7.8
Communist	James Mitchell	1,539	7.8	+7.8
Total formal votes		19,785	94.4	
Informal votes		1,166	5.6	
Turnout		20,951	94.1	
Labor hold		Swing	N/A	

=== Stirling ===
1959 South Australian state election: Stirling
Party	Candidate	Votes	%	±%
Liberal and Country	William Jenkins	unopposed		
Liberal and Country hold		Swing		

=== Stuart ===
1959 South Australian state election: Stuart
Party	Candidate	Votes	%	±%
Labor	Lindsay Riches	5,977	88.4	−11.6
Independent	James Yates	788	11.6	+11.6
Total formal votes		6,765	96.1	
Informal votes		271	3.9	
Turnout		7,036	93.4	
Labor hold		Swing	N/A	

=== Torrens ===
1959 South Australian state election: Torrens
Party	Candidate	Votes	%	±%
Liberal and Country	John Coumbe	10,608	53.9	+2.6
Labor	Doreen Pattison	7,764	39.4	−1.2
Democratic Labor	Francis Corcoran	1,323	6.7	−1.4
Total formal votes		19,695	98.3	−0.1
Informal votes		335	1.7	+0.1
Turnout		20,030	92.4	−1.2
Two-party-preferred result
Liberal and Country	John Coumbe		59.6	+1.4
Labor	Doreen Pattison		40.4	−1.4
Liberal and Country hold		Swing	+1.4	

- Two party preferred vote was estimated.

=== Unley ===
1959 South Australian state election: Unley
Party	Candidate	Votes	%	±%
Liberal and Country	Colin Dunnage	9,631	50.2	−3.4
Labor	Arthur Savage	8,022	41.8	+3.1
Democratic Labor	William Dempsey	1,519	7.9	+0.2
Total formal votes		19,172	97.6	−0.5
Informal votes		466	2.4	+0.5
Turnout		19,638	93.7	+0.1
Two-party-preferred result
Liberal and Country	Colin Dunnage		57.0	−3.2
Labor	Arthur Savage		43.0	+3.2
Liberal and Country hold		Swing	−3.2	

- Two party preferred vote was estimated.

=== Victoria ===
1959 South Australian state election: Victoria
Party	Candidate	Votes	%	±%
Liberal and Country	Leslie Harding	3,841	56.7	−5.0
Labor	David Walker	2,557	37.8	−0.5
Democratic Labor	John Gartner	374	5.5	+5.5
Total formal votes		6,772	99.0	+0.4
Informal votes		67	1.0	−0.4
Turnout		6,839	95.2	+1.1
Two-party-preferred result
Liberal and Country	Leslie Harding		61.4	−0.3
Labor	David Walker		38.6	+0.3
Liberal and Country hold		Swing	−0.3	

- Two party preferred vote was estimated.

=== Wallaroo ===
1959 South Australian state election: Wallaroo
Party	Candidate	Votes	%	±%
Labor	Lloyd Hughes	3,615	58.9	+14.3
Liberal and Country	Clifford Dunstone	2,519	41.1	−6.1
Total formal votes		6,134	98.9	−0.1
Informal votes		65	1.1	+0.1
Turnout		6,199	96.9	+0.6
Labor gain from Liberal and Country		Swing	+10.9	

=== West Torrens ===
1959 South Australian state election: West Torrens
Party	Candidate	Votes	%	±%
Labor	Fred Walsh	12,640	50.6	+0.2
Liberal and Country	Ross Stanford	10,981	43.9	+1.4
Democratic Labor	Richard Mills	1,382	5.5	−1.6
Total formal votes		25,003	97.6	−0.5
Informal votes		611	2.4	+0.5
Turnout		25,614	93.6	+0.5
Two-party-preferred result
Labor	Fred Walsh		51.4	0.0
Liberal and Country	Ross Stanford		48.6	0.0
Labor hold		Swing	0.0	

- Two party preferred vote was estimated.

=== Whyalla ===
1959 South Australian state election: Whyalla
Party	Candidate	Votes	%	±%
Labor	Ron Loveday	5,356	84.9	−15.1
Independent	Allan Mossop	956	15.1	+15.1
Total formal votes		6,312	96.4	
Informal votes		233	3.6	
Turnout		6,545	88.8	
Labor hold		Swing	N/A	

=== Yorke Peninsula ===
1959 South Australian state election: Yorke Peninsula
Party	Candidate	Votes	%	±%
Liberal and Country	Cecil Hincks	unopposed		
Liberal and Country hold		Swing		

== See also ==
- Candidates of the 1959 South Australian state election
- Members of the South Australian House of Assembly, 1959–1962
