= Electoral results for the district of Millicent =

South Australian district election results

This is a list of election results for the electoral district of Millicent in South Australian elections.

== Members for Millicent ==
Member	Party	Term
Jim Corcoran	Labor	1956–1962
Des Corcoran	Labor	1962–1975
Murray Vandepeer	Liberal	1975–1977

== Election results ==
=== Elections in the 1970s ===
1975 South Australian state election: Millicent
Party	Candidate	Votes	%	±%
Liberal	Murray Vandepeer	4,195	38.8	−4.7
Labor	Brian Corcoran	3,963	36.6	−19.9
National	Donald Ferguson	2,014	18.6	+18.6
Liberal Movement	Brian Prowse	535	5.0	+5.0
Independent	John Clark	108	1.0	+1.0
Total formal votes		10,815	97.6	−0.9
Informal votes		265	2.4	+0.9
Turnout		11,080	95.5	−0.7
Two-party-preferred result
Liberal	Murray Vandepeer	6,482	59.9	+16.4
Labor	Brian Corcoran	4,333	40.1	−16.4
Liberal gain from Labor		Swing	+16.4	

1973 South Australian state election: Millicent
Party	Candidate	Votes	%	±%
Labor	Des Corcoran	5,724	56.5	+2.5
Liberal and Country	Murray Vandepeer	4,404	43.5	−2.5
Total formal votes		10,128	98.5	0.0
Informal votes		151	1.5	0.0
Turnout		10,279	96.2	−1.6
Labor hold		Swing	+2.5	

1970 South Australian state election: Millicent
Party	Candidate	Votes	%	±%
Labor	Des Corcoran	5,016	54.0	
Liberal and Country	Brian O'Connor	4,273	46.0	
Total formal votes		9,289	98.5	
Informal votes		139	1.5	
Turnout		9,428	97.8	
Labor hold		Swing		

=== Elections in the 1960s ===
Millicent state by-election, 22 June 1968
Party	Candidate	Votes	%	±%
Labor	Des Corcoran	3,994	52.5	+2.5
Liberal and Country	Martin Cameron	3,564	46.8	−3.2
Democratic Labor	Douglas Barnes	51	0.7	+0.7
Total formal votes		7,609	99.6	+0.6
Informal votes		34	0.4	−0.6
Turnout		7,643	97.4	+1.4
Labor hold		Swing	N/A	

- Preferences were not distributed.

1968 South Australian state election: Millicent
Party	Candidate	Votes	%	±%
Labor	Des Corcoran	3,635	50.0	−11.8
Liberal and Country	Martin Cameron	3,634	50.0	+11.8
Total formal votes		7,269	99.0	+0.2
Informal votes		73	1.0	−0.2
Turnout		7,342	96.0	+1.0
Labor hold		Swing	−11.8	

- This result was declared void by the Court of Disputed Returns and a by-election was held, in which Labor retained the seat.

1965 South Australian state election: Millicent
Party	Candidate	Votes	%	±%
Labor	Des Corcoran	4,160	61.8	+8.7
Liberal and Country	John Osborne	2,569	38.2	−7.1
Total formal votes		6,729	98.8	−0.5
Informal votes		78	1.2	+0.5
Turnout		6,807	95.0	−1.5
Labor hold		Swing	+8.5	

1962 South Australian state election: Millicent
Party	Candidate	Votes	%	±%
Labor	Des Corcoran	3,530	53.1	−1.4
Liberal and Country	Renfrey DeGaris	3,012	45.3	−0.2
Democratic Labor	Neil Henderson	106	1.6	+1.6
Total formal votes		6,648	99.3	+0.1
Informal votes		47	0.7	−0.1
Turnout		6,695	96.5	+0.4
Two-party-preferred result
Labor	Des Corcoran	3,546	53.3	−1.2
Liberal and Country	Renfrey DeGaris	3,102	46.7	+1.2
Labor hold		Swing	−1.2	

=== Elections in the 1950s ===
1959 South Australian state election: Millicent
Party	Candidate	Votes	%	±%
Labor	Jim Corcoran	3,409	54.5	+2.2
Liberal and Country	William Gordon	2,849	45.5	−2.2
Total formal votes		6,258	99.2	−0.1
Informal votes		52	0.8	+0.1
Turnout		6,310	96.1	+0.8
Labor hold		Swing	+2.2	

1956 South Australian state election: Millicent
Party	Candidate	Votes	%	±%
Labor	Jim Corcoran	3,201	52.3	
Liberal and Country	William Gordon	2,918	47.7	
Total formal votes		6,119	99.3	
Informal votes		42	0.7	
Turnout		6,161	95.3	
Labor hold		Swing		
