= 1959 South Australian state election =

← 1956	7 March 1959	1962 →

All 39 seats in the South Australian House of Assembly 20 seats were needed for a majority
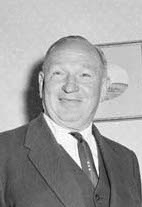

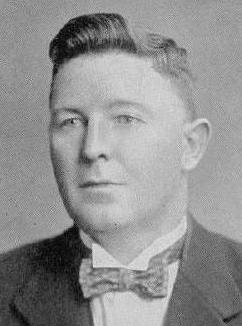
	First party	Second party
Leader	Thomas Playford	Mick O'Halloran
Party	Liberal and Country League	Labor
Leader since	5 November 1938	10 October 1949
Leader's seat	Gumeracha	Frome
Last election	21 seats	15 seats
Seats won	20 seats	17 seats
Seat change	▼1	▲2
Percentage	50.3%	49.7%
Swing	▼1.0	▲1.0
- A map of South Australian electorates from 1955 to 1969, during the height of the Playmander.
Premier before election
Thomas Playford
Liberal and Country League
Elected Premier
Thomas Playford
Liberal and Country League

State elections were held in South Australia on 7 March 1959. All 39 seats in the South Australian House of Assembly were up for election. The incumbent Liberal and Country League led by Premier of South Australia Thomas Playford IV defeated the Australian Labor Party led by Leader of the Opposition Mick O'Halloran.

== Background ==
Labor won two seats at this election, rural Mount Gambier from an Independent and rural Wallaroo from the LCL. Both of these seats had been previously won in by-elections in 1957 and 1958, and Labor retained them.

== Results ==
Arrangement of the House of Assembly after the 1959 state election.

South Australian state election, 7 March 1959 House of Assembly << 1956–1962 >>
Enrolled voters	497,456				
Votes cast	400,531		Turnout	93.95%	+0.05%
Informal votes	11,593		Informal	2.89%	+0.50%
Summary of votes by party
Party	Primary votes	%	Swing	Seats	Change
Labor	191,933	49.35%	+1.98%	17	+ 2
Liberal and Country	143,710	36.95%	+0.26%	20	– 1
Democratic Labor	21,984	5.65%	–1.79%	0	± 0
Communist	5,505	1.42%	+0.26%	0	± 0
Independent	25,806	6.63%	–0.71%	2	– 1
Total	388,938			39	
Two-party-preferred
Liberal and Country		50.30%	–1.00%		
Labor		49.70%	+1.00%		

- The primary vote figures were from contested seats, while the state-wide two-party-preferred vote figures were estimated from all seats.

== Post-election pendulum ==
LCL seats (20)
Marginal
Fairly safe
Unley	Colin Dunnage	LCL	7.0%
Chaffey	Harold King	LCL	8.2%
Torrens	John Coumbe	LCL	9.6%
Safe
Flinders	Glen Pearson	LCL	10.1%
Victoria	Leslie Harding	LCL	11.4%
Glenelg	Baden Pattinson	LCL	12.4%
Onkaparinga	Howard Shannon	LCL	13.3%
Angas	Berthold Teusner	LCL	14.7%
Mitcham	Robin Millhouse	LCL	20.2%
Light	George Hambour	LCL	21.8%
Gumeracha	Thomas Playford	LCL	26.4%
Burnside	Joyce Steele	LCL	undistributed
Gouger	Steele Hall	LCL	undistributed
Albert	Bill Nankivell	LCL	unopposed
Alexandra	David Brookman	LCL	unopposed
Barossa	Condor Laucke	LCL	unopposed
Eyre	George Bockelberg	LCL	unopposed
Rocky River	James Heaslip	LCL	unopposed
Stirling	William Jenkins	LCL	unopposed
Yorke Peninsula	Cecil Hincks	LCL	unopposed

Labor seats (17)
Marginal
West Torrens	Fred Walsh	ALP	1.4%
Frome	Mick O'Halloran	ALP	2.5%
Millicent	Jim Corcoran	ALP	4.5%
Norwood	Don Dunstan	ALP	5.0%
Fairly safe
Edwardstown	Frank Walsh	ALP	7.8%
Mount Gambier	Ron Ralston	ALP	8.3%
Wallaroo	Lloyd Hughes	ALP	8.9%
Safe
Murray	Gabe Bywaters	ALP	15.1%
Gawler	John Clark	ALP	17.7%
Adelaide	Sam Lawn	ALP	30.1% v DLP
Port Adelaide	John Ryan	ALP	34.9% v DLP
Whyalla	Ron Loveday	ALP	34.9% v IND
Stuart	Lindsay Riches	ALP	38.4% v IND
Semaphore	Harold Tapping	ALP	42.2% v COM
Enfield	Joe Jennings	ALP	undistributed
Port Pirie	Dave McKee	ALP	undistributed
Hindmarsh	Cyril Hutchens	ALP	unopposed
Crossbench seats (2)
Burra	Percy Quirke	IND	2.1% v LCL
Ridley	Tom Stott	IND	6.7% v LCL

== See also ==
- Results of the South Australian state election, 1959 (House of Assembly)
- Candidates of the 1959 South Australian state election
- Members of the South Australian House of Assembly, 1959-1962
- Members of the South Australian Legislative Council, 1959-1962
- Playmander
