= Paul Moran (photojournalist) =

Australian journalist (1963–2003)

Paul William Moran
- Born: Paul William Moran; 30 May 1963; Adelaide, Australia
- Died: 22 March 2003 (aged 39); Gerdigo, Iraq
- Cause of death: Suicide car bombing
- Resting place: North Brighton Cemetery, Adelaide, Australia; 35.002353°S 138.519539°E
- Citizenship: Australian
- Education: Sacred Heart College (Adelaide)
- Occupation: Photojournalist
- Employer: Australian Broadcasting Corporation
- Spouse: Ivana Rapajic
- Children: Tara Moran
- Parent(s): Gerry and Kath Moran
- Relatives: Three brothers

Paul William Moran (30 May 1963 – 22 March 2003) was an Australian freelance photojournalist for the Australian Broadcasting Corporation and an experienced international journalist. Moran was killed by a suicide car bomb at a checkpoint just outside Khurmal, in northeast Iraq near the border with Iran during the Iraq War. He was the first international media casualty of the Iraq war. According to the Media Entertainment & Arts Alliance, Moran was one of three Australian cases where journalist(s) have been killed with impunity.

== Personal details ==
Paul Moran was the youngest in a family of four boys. He was born and raised in Adelaide to parents, Gerry and Kath Moran. His alma mater was Sacred Heart College in Adelaide. In 1990, Moran moved to London, and it was here that he made his initial Middle East contacts. He was married to Ivana Rapajic and the couple had a daughter who was born one month before Moran's death at the age of 39.

== Career ==
Paul Moran was a freelance cameraman for the Australian Broadcasting Corporation. He moved to London 1990 and it was there that he made his initial Middle East contacts which were to inspire his interest in this region. Moran's working relationship with the Rendon Group and the Iraqi National Congress (INC) led to a high-profile international news story that purported to document a covert Iraqi program to develop weapons of mass destruction prior to the Iraq War. Moran worked for the ABC as a cameraman in northern Iraq in 2003.

== Death ==
Paul Moran was killed in Gerdigo near Halabja, Iraq, which is shown in relation to the capital city Baghdad.

Moran worked for the ABC of Australia and he was travelling from Sulaymaniyah to a base that had been struck by US missiles and belonged to the Ansar al-Islam on 22 March 2003. His group just arrived at a check point and Moran was shooting video when a car bomb exploded in a passing taxi, killing Moran and injuring Eric Campbell. Three or four other people besides Moran died at the checkpoint in Khurmal and 23 others in addition to Campbell were injured. The Ansar al-Islam were accused of carrying out the car bomb attack in response to the earlier US attack.

== Context ==
Paul Moran was recruited after Iraq invaded Kuwait to work for an exiled Kuwait TV service. Those who knew him said he preferred the independent life of a freelancer. He spent a year making a documentary about refugees and the humanitarian issues they faced, en titled, Dangerously Adrift. According to the Committee to Protect Journalist, as of 2013 one-hundred and fifty journalist have been killed in Iraq since the US invasion.

== Reactions ==
Eric Campbell, who is a journalist for ABC TV, blamed Mullah Krekar, a Salafist of Ansar al-Islam, for the attack.

Koïchiro Matsuura, the director of UNESCO, said, "In a war that also includes a fierce media battle, the task of seeking independent information is especially vital if world public opinion is to avoid being the target of manipulation and propaganda" and the killing of journalists like Moran was a violation of Article 79 of the Protocol Additional to the Geneva Convention.

== Foundation ==
Paul Moran Foundation was established by his wife. The non-for-profit funded a children's library in Erbil, which is in the Kurdish area.
