= Allan Hookings =

Australian politician

Allan Charles Hookings (6 September 1913 – 31 October 1962) was a farmer and politician in the State of South Australia.

Allan was born in Riverton, the only son of Thomas Charles Hookings and Ivy Doris Hookings (née Pickering) (c. 1890 – 25 October 1928) of "Oaklands" sheep stud, Tarlee, later of Winchester Street, Malvern. On 26 February 1930 Thomas Hookings married again, to Alice Babidge (c. 1865 – 8 January 1944). By 1930 they had moved to a farm at Tantanoola. Allan continued farming in the Tantanoola area.

He was elected for the Liberal and Country League to a Southern district seat in the Legislative Council in February 1959, and died in office. He was succeeded by Ren DeGaris.
