= Eric Campbell (reporter) =

Australian foreign correspondent

- Occupation: Reporter

Eric Campbell is an Australian foreign correspondent, who began his career as a journalist at The Sydney Morning Herald. His assignments have included reporting the wars in Chechnya, Afghanistan and the Balkans, tracking polar bears in the Arctic, filming at secret military bases in Central Russia and travelling by sled with nomadic reindeer herders in Siberia.

From 1987 to 1988, Campbell co-presented The Investigators program for the Australian Broadcasting Corporation (ABC), before a two-year stint at the Nine Network reporting for A Current Affair. He was the ABC's Moscow correspondent from 1996 to 1999, covering the tumultuous changes in the former Soviet Union in an area that spread from the Baltic Sea to the Pacific. Campbell has covered many important and dangerous events in recent political history, writing a book detailing some of his most bizarre experiences as a foreign journalist, titled Absurdistan. In 2000 he returned to Sydney as a reporter/producer for ABC TV's Foreign Correspondent program. Campbell has also reported for other ABC programs: The 7.30 Report, Lateline and Quantum.

On 22 March 2003, Campbell was working with cameraman Paul Moran in Northern Iraq during the Invasion of Iraq when a suicide bomber blew his car up near where they were filming. Campbell was maimed, but Moran did not survive the blast.

In 2014, Campbell was among the first foreign correspondents to shoot a film on the controversial Ayungin Shoal (Second Thomas Shoal) in the Spratly Islands and on board the Philippine Navy's ship Sierra Madre (LT 57) grounded there.

His second book Silly Isles was published in 2017.

Campbell also reported on Foreign Correspondent for the Australian Broadcasting Corporation on the Russian invasion of Ukraine.

== Awards ==
In 1999, Campbell won a New York Television Festival Award for environmental reporting and was a finalist in the Australian Walkley Awards for his coverage of the war and humanitarian crisis in Kosovo. In 2003. his story The Al Qaeda Tapes on al-Qaeda in Afghanistan won a Logie for 'Most Outstanding News Coverage'.

Other wins in the New York Festivals awards:

- 2015
  - Category – Magazine Format: Silver World Medal (joint winner) for Nepal – "The Road"
  - Category – Best News Documentary/Special Bronze World Medal (joint winner) for Dubai – "Trapped"
- 2013
  - Category – Science & Technology: Bronze World Medal (joint winner) for Rise of the Machines
- 2012
  - Category – Magazine Format: Silver World Medal (joint winner) for Bhutan – "The Secret Garden"
- 2011
  - Category – Media Award for Environmental Reporting: (joint winner) for Democratic Republic of Congo: "The Swingers"
  - Category – Best News/Documentary/Special: Bronze World Medal (joint winner) for Thailand – "Long Live the King"
- 2010
  - Category – Coverage of On-going News Story (longform): Gold World Medal (joint winner) for Iran – "The Rebellion Network"
  - Category – Best Public Affairs Program: Silver World Medal (joint winner) for Colombia – "The Third Amigo"
