= Des Corcoran =

Australian politician (1928–2004)

The Honourable Des Corcoran AO
- Corcoran in 1979

Premier of South Australia
- In office 15 February 1979 – 18 September 1979
- Monarch: Elizabeth II
- Governor: Sir Keith Seaman
- Deputy: Hugh Hudson
- Preceded by: Don Dunstan
- Succeeded by: David Tonkin

Leader of the Opposition in South Australia
- In office 18 September 1979 – 2 October 1979
- Preceded by: David Tonkin
- Succeeded by: John Bannon

Leader of the South Australian Labor Party
- In office 15 March 1979 – 2 October 1979; Acting leader: 15 February – 15 March 1979
- Preceded by: Don Dunstan
- Succeeded by: John Bannon

Deputy Premier of South Australia
- In office 2 July 1970 – 15 March 1979
- Premier: Don Dunstan
- Preceded by: Office re-established
- Succeeded by: Hugh Hudson
- In office 26 March 1968 – 16 April 1968
- Premier: Don Dunstan
- Preceded by: New office
- Succeeded by: Office abolished

Deputy Leader of the South Australian Labor Party
- In office 1 June 1967 – 15 February 1979
- Deputy: Hugh Hudson
- Leader: Don Dunstan
- Preceded by: Cyril Hutchens
- Succeeded by: Hugh Hudson

Treasurer of South Australia
- In office 15 February 1979 – 18 September 1979
- Premier: Himself
- Preceded by: Don Dunstan
- Succeeded by: David Tonkin

Member of the South Australian Parliament for Hartley
- In office 17 September 1977 – 6 November 1982
- Preceded by: New district
- Succeeded by: Terry Groom

Member of the South Australian Parliament for Coles
- In office 12 July 1975 – 17 September 1977
- Preceded by: Len King
- Succeeded by: Jennifer Cashmore

Member of the South Australian Parliament for Millicent
- In office 3 March 1962 – 12 July 1975
- Preceded by: Jim Corcoran
- Succeeded by: Murray Vandepeer

Personal details
- Born: James Desmond Corcoran; 8 November 1928 Millicent, South Australia, Australia
- Died: 3 January 2004 (aged 75) Adelaide, South Australia, Australia
- Party: Labor (SA)
- Spouse: Carmel Campbell (m. 1957)
- Children: 8
- Parent: Jim Corcoran (father)
- Awards: Officer of the Order of Australia (1982)
- Military service
- Allegiance: Australia
- Service: Army
- Rank: Captain
- Service number: 23934
- Units: 1st Battalion, Royal Australian Regiment
- Active service: Korean War; Malayan Emergency
- Awards: Mentioned in despatches (twice)

James Desmond Corcoran AO (8 November 1928 – 3 January 2004) was an Australian politician who served as the 37th premier of South Australia between February and September 1979, following the resignation of Don Dunstan. During his brief premiership Corcoran also served as state treasurer. Born at Millicent in the southeast of the state, he served in the Australian Army in the Korean War and Malayan Emergency, reaching the rank of captain, and being twice mentioned in despatches. Following his discharge in 1961, Corcoran was elected to the House of Assembly, succeeding his father Jim Corcoran – who retired at the 1962 election – as the member for the electoral district of Millicent representing the Australian Labor Party.

Corcoran was a key figure in the modernisation of the state branch of the Labor Party, which had been in opposition since 1933. When the party gained power in 1965, Corcoran was allocated the portfolios of irrigation, lands and repatriation in the government of Frank Walsh. Upon Walsh's retirement in 1968, Corcoran contested the party leadership but was defeated by Dunstan. In the Dunstan cabinet, Corcoran retained responsibility for irrigation and lands, and replaced repatriation with immigration. In March 1968, he became the first formally appointed deputy premier of the state, and gained the tourism portfolio. Two months later, Labor lost government and Corcoran nearly lost his seat, but retained his role as Dunstan's deputy.

At the 1970 state election, Labor returned to the government benches, and Corcoran regained his position as deputy premier, and took up the marine and works ministries. Dunstan and Corcoran had very different styles, but they formed a strong and respectful partnership. From 1975, unfavourable redistributions caused Corcoran to shift to metropolitan seats, first Coles, then from 1977, Hartley, which he held until 1982. Following the 1977 state election, he gained the environment portfolio, retaining marine and works. After Dunstan's resignation, Corcoran became premier and decided to call an early election to gain a personal mandate, buoyed by polling. This proved unwise, as the campaign went badly, business groups and media openly supported the opposition Liberal Party, and Labor lost office. Having retained Hartley, Corcoran resigned as Labor leader and did not contest the 1982 election. Dunstan was angry with Corcoran for wasting a full year of the term of government they had won in 1977, and because he had not continued to pursue Dunstan's policies on industrial democracy and Aboriginal land rights.

Made an Officer of the Order of Australia in 1982 in recognition of his service to politics and government, Corcoran was also awarded the Centenary Medal in 2001. He died in 2004 following a long illness, and was granted a state funeral. Described as a larger than life character who was respected on both sides of politics, Corcoran's long and successful partnership with Dunstan was a hallmark of his political life.

== Early life and military service ==
James Desmond "Des" Corcoran was born on 8 November 1928 in Millicent, South Australia. He was the youngest of nine children of Jim Corcoran and his wife Teresa Catherine née Sutton. Jim had served as a corporal in the 27th Battalion of the Australian Imperial Force on the Western Front during World War I, and had been wounded during the Battle of Amiens in August 1918. Des attended Tantanoola Primary School, but left school at 13 and worked in a bakery. He joined the Australian Labor Party (ALP) in 1941. His mother died when he was 16, and around that time he and his older brother Robert embarked on a working holiday around Australia. While in Wollongong in New South Wales, they saw an advertisement for men to enlist in the Australian Army to fight in the Korean War, and after tossing a coin to decide what to do, they both went to enlist.

In the meantime, following his unsuccessful attempt to be elected to the electoral district of Victoria in the South Australian House of Assembly in a by-election in 1932, Jim Corcoran was also unsuccessful in the state elections of 1933 and 1944, before finally prevailing in a by-election in September 1945. He was unsuccessful in his bid to be re-elected in the 1947, and 1950 state elections.

Robert served in Korea as a Royal Australian Army Ordnance Corps sergeant with the 3rd Battalion, Royal Australian Regiment in 1951–1952. Des was allocated the service number 23934, and allotted as an infantry soldier and posted to the 1st Battalion, Royal Australian Regiment (1 RAR). The battalion trained at Ingleburn, New South Wales, then embarked at Sydney on 3 March 1952 and sailed for Japan on the troop transport MV Devonshire, arriving in Kure on 18 March. After further training, 1 RAR was transported to Korea aboard the Empire Longford and disembarked in Korea on 1 June to join the 28th Commonwealth Infantry Brigade. The following month the battalion was detached to the British 29th Infantry Brigade, and relieved units on Hills 159, 210 and 355. Its duties included general patrolling along the Jamestown Line, a series of static defensive positions just north of the 38th Parallel (38°N) along which the earlier mobile war had settled into trench warfare. Its main tasks were securing defences, repairing minefield fences, and conducting reconnaissance of enemy positions to gather information.

By early December 1952, Des was a corporal and temporary sergeant in D Company when a four-man patrol was negotiating an enemy minefield. One of the men initiated a mine and was killed by the resulting explosion, which wounded two others. The unwounded soldier ran back to friendly lines for assistance, and Corcoran came forward under enemy mortar fire, dragged and carried the wounded men in, and then brought in the body of the dead soldier. For his "courage and skill in evacuating casualties through minefield gaps", and as a patrol commander in 1 RAR, Corcoran was mentioned in despatches. While Des was still serving in Korea, his father Jim was again elected to the district of Victoria in the March 1953 state election. Des returned to Australia in March 1954, and after several weeks of leave, was posted to New Guinea.

At the 1956 state election, Jim Corcoran successfully contested the new electoral district of Millicent which had been excised from the district of Victoria as part of a redistribution, and successfully defended it in the 1959 state election. On 31 August 1957, Des married Carmel Campbell at the school chapel at Rostrevor College. The couple had eight children. Des Corcoran was promoted to warrant officer class two and served for twenty months as the company sergeant major of the headquarters of the 28th Commonwealth Infantry Brigade Group in Malaya during the Malayan Emergency, for which he was mentioned in despatches for a second time, this time for "outstanding service". Identified for his potential as an officer but lacking the necessary educational qualifications, Corcoran undertook six months of study with the Australian Army Education Service to receive his intermediate certificate, then completed his leaving certificate in six weeks, completing five subjects with a distinction in English. He was subsequently commissioned as a captain.

== Politics ==
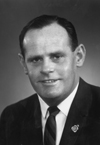
Corcoran in 1962

Des Corcoran left the Army in 1961 and in the 3 March 1962 state election was elected to the House of Assembly for the ALP, succeeding his father as the member for Millicent. He received 53.1 per cent of the two-party-preferred votes (TPP), defeating Ren DeGaris of the Liberal and Country League (LCL). In his first speech in the house, on 24 July 1962, his father was present in the gallery, and he attributed his successful election to James Corcoran's "able and honest representation" of the people of the seat of Millicent. His speech emphasised policy areas that would remain central to his political interests throughout his career. These included: ensuring that country South Australians had the same access to services as those who lived in Adelaide, especially in areas such as utilities and education; and the promotion of the agriculture, fishing and forestry industries in the southeast of the state. He was a strong proponent of the paper industry and water controls for the irrigation scheme in the southeast. Labor had been in opposition in the state since 1933, and Corcoran, along with his colleagues Don Dunstan, Mick Young and Clyde Cameron, was a key player in the modernisation of the state Labor Party as a political force. This saw the ALP develop policy and campaign hard on education, health and working conditions, and against racial discrimination and the malapportionment of electoral districts in the state, known as the Playmander. When the ALP won government in South Australia for the first time since 1930 in the 6 March 1965 state election, Corcoran became Minister of Irrigation, Minister of Lands, and Minister of Repatriation. In the election, Corcoran increased his share of the TPP to 61.8 per cent. Corcoran served on the parliamentary committee on land settlement from March to November 1965. The new Premier, Frank Walsh, was a Catholic like Corcoran, when the Labor caucus was dominated by Protestants, and the ALP federally was still reeling from the 1955 split of the party and the creation of the socially conservative and Catholic-dominated Democratic Labour Party (DLP). Corcoran's father Jim had died in May 1965.

Walsh was already 67 years old when he became premier, and the ALP rules applying at the time required him to retire from parliament at the next election. He was reluctant to do so, and made moves to have the rules modified to allow him to serve on. His party colleagues resisted this, and ultimately the ALP state council passed a congratulatory motion that included thanking him for "selflessly stepping down so that a new leader could establish himself before the next election". In the face of this, Walsh reluctantly resigned effective from 1 June 1967. Coinciding with Walsh's retirement, there was an ALP leadership ballot which included Corcoran, Dunstan, Gabe Bywaters and Cyril Hutchens. Walsh strongly supported Corcoran, perhaps partly because he wrongly believed that Dunstan had been involved in some way with the congratulatory motion that Cameron had moved to push Walsh out. In the first round Corcoran received ten votes and Dunstan nine from the caucus of twenty-five, but in the second round Dunstan was the clear winner with fourteen votes and a majority, with Corcoran receiving eleven votes. He did, however, become deputy leader.

In Dunstan's 1967–1968 cabinet, Corcoran dropped the repatriation portfolio and took up immigration, retaining lands and irrigation. Walsh remained in cabinet – with the social welfare portfolio – until March 1968. On 26 March 1968, Corcoran became the first officially-appointed deputy premier – the position having been informal up to that point – and gained the tourism portfolio, which was combined with immigration. Corcoran was a loyal deputy, and the working relationship between the two was "smooth and cooperative", employing an internal consensus style within the party that had been carefully developed by Cameron and the Labor senator Jim Toohey since the late 1940s, and contrasted with the conflict-riven nature of the party in other states, largely due to the influence of the DLP.

Labor lost government at the 2 March 1968 state election, mainly due to losing two marginal rural seats. Corcoran was nearly defeated in his own seat, winning by a single vote over his LCL rival Martin Cameron. Cameron disputed the result and a by-election was held on 22 June, with Corcoran receiving 52.5 per cent of the TPP. This left the ALP and LCL on nineteen seats each, so that the leader of the LCL, Steele Hall, had to rely on the independent Tom Stott, who was elected as Speaker and therefore had a casting vote. The Playmander had enabled the LCL to form a minority government despite only receiving 43 per cent of the state-wide votes. During the term in opposition, Corcoran remained Dunstan's deputy and hence Deputy Leader of the Opposition, and the pair worked together well despite any rift that may have been caused by the struggle to succeed Walsh.

In Labor's victory at the 30 May 1970 state election, Corcoran retained the seat of Millicent with 54 per cent of the TPP. He resumed his role as deputy premier, and held the works and marine portfolios. Corcoran handled the interaction between the Dunstan ministry and the Labor caucus, using his strong personality to settle disputes. Over the next nine years, Dunstan and Corcoran made an unconventional but strong team. A devout Catholic and man of high personal morals, Corcoran privately opposed many of the social reforms Dunstan was implementing, such as liberalised abortion and homosexuality laws. In addition, Corcoran disliked Dunstan's glamorous image and fondness for the arts. A conservative dresser, Corcoran did not at all share Dunstan's enthusiasm for wearing casual clothes on public occasions. Nevertheless, the two men felt a wary respect for one another and managed to maintain a working relationship. Behind the scenes, Dunstan sometimes found Corcoran's plain-speaking style useful to control others within the ALP.

Corcoran held Millicent with 56.5 per cent of the TPP in the 10 March 1973 state election, defeating the LCL's Murray Vandepeer. A redistribution following that election erased Corcoran's majority. Believing this made Millicent unwinnable, Corcoran transferred to the eastern Adelaide seat of Coles, previously held by Labor by the retiring Len King, for the 12 July 1975 state election. Corcoran won the seat with 52.4 per cent of the TPP, and Vandepeer received 59.9 per cent of the TPP in Millicent. When this margin was erased in another redistribution, Corcoran transferred to the newly created and nearby northeastern Adelaide district of Hartley, receiving 58.8 per cent of the TPP at the 17 September 1977 state election, with Coles falling to Jennifer Adamson of the Liberal Party (the renamed LCL). Corcoran gained the environment portfolio in the new government, while retaining his other portfolios.

By early 1979, Dunstan's health had deteriorated to the point that he could not continue in office, and he resigned in February. Dunstan had wanted Planning Minister Hugh Hudson to replace him, but Hudson lacked the numbers in the caucus despite Dunstan's support. On 15 February, Corcoran was elected as leader, thus finally achieving his ambition of becoming premier. He also served as his own treasurer along with adding the ethnic affairs portfolio to immigration. Mike Rann, who later became premier, served as Corcoran's press secretary during his short premiership. Despite its popularity in the state at the time, Corcoran sidelined Dunstan's push for industrial democracy, where workers would have a say in decision-making within companies. Spurred by positive opinion polls in mid-1979, Corcoran called a snap election after less than a year in the hope that he would gain a mandate of his own. The election campaign was plagued by problems; business groups and the state's main afternoon tabloid newspaper, The News, openly sided with the Liberal Party.

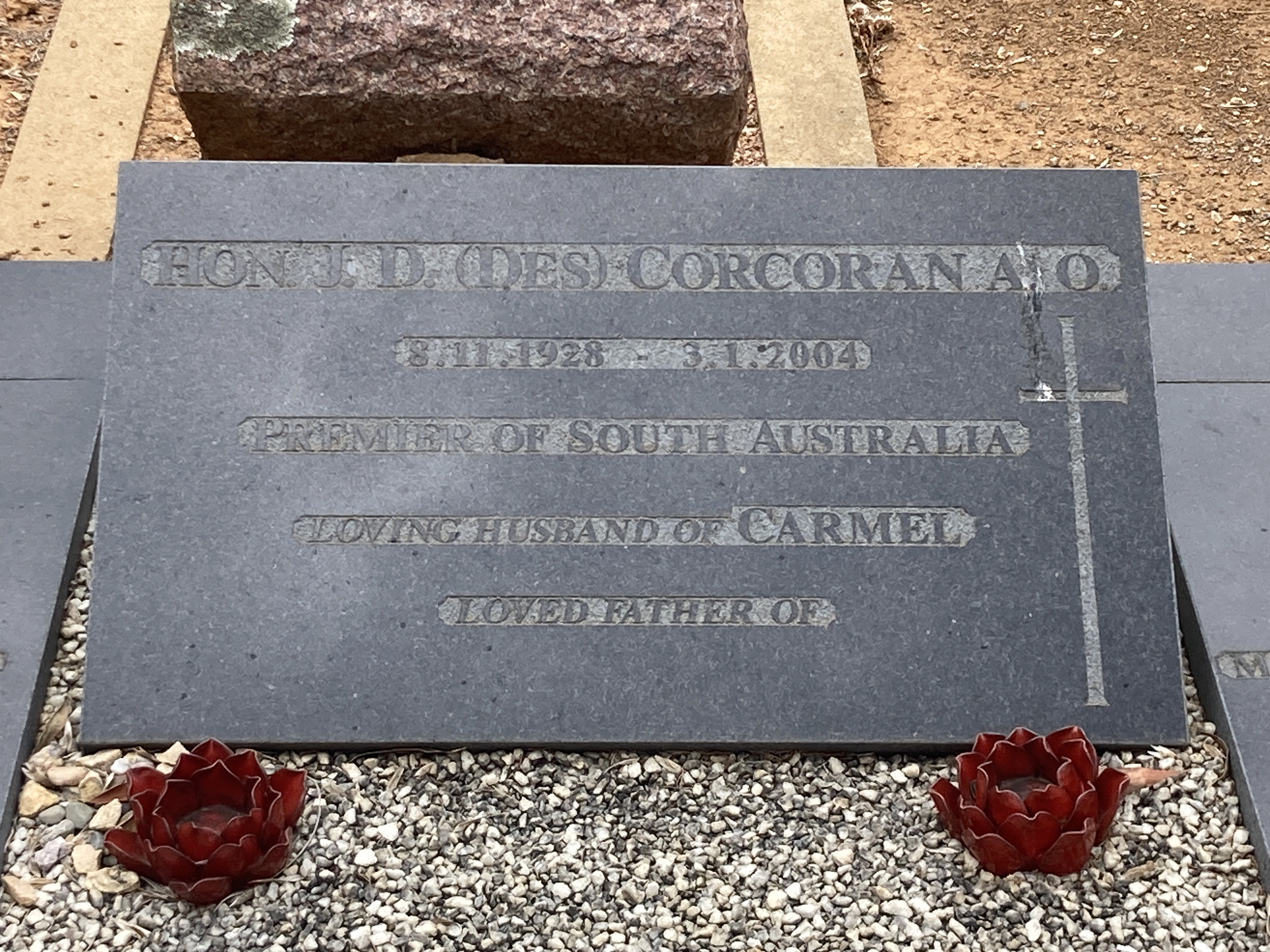
The gravestone on Des Corcoran's grave at North Brighton Cemetery

At the 15 September 1979 state election, the Liberals under David Tonkin achieved an eleven per cent swing towards them and won. Corcoran held Hartley with 50.7 per cent of the TPP. Corcoran resigned his commissions as premier and treasurer on 18 September, and resigned from the Labor leadership on 2 October. He was succeeded by the much younger John Bannon, whose urbane style and academic background meant he was much closer in style to Dunstan than to Corcoran. At the 6 November 1982 state election, Bannon easily defeated Tonkin and led Labor back into government, but Corcoran did not contest his seat of Hartley, which was retained for Labor by Terry Groom. Dunstan was angry with Corcoran, feeling that he had wasted a full year of the term they had won in 1977, and had not continued to pursue Aboriginal land rights and industrial democracy.

Corcoran was appointed as an Officer of the Order of Australia in the 1982 Australia Day Honours, "in recognition of service to politics and government". Between 1983 and 1987 Corcoran served on the Council of the Australian War Memorial. In 2001, Corcoran was awarded the Centenary Medal.

== Death and legacy ==
Corcoran died in Adelaide on 3 January 2004, aged 75, after a long illness. Upon his death, Rann, by then premier himself, described the strong and historic political partnership between Dunstan and Corcoran as "very successful", despite the two being "chalk and cheese". Rann went on to say that Corcoran would be "sorely missed" as someone who was larger than life and respected across the political spectrum in South Australia. He also noted that Corcoran would be remembered "for his gregarious personality and how he so often used humour to heal differences". Don Hopgood, who served as education minister alongside Corcoran, observed that he brought strength to the Dunstan administration. Then opposition leader Dean Brown, who had himself served as premier between 1993 and 1996, stated that Corcoran was "approachable and enjoyed a good yarn and joke", and recalled that "his word could always be trusted and all members of the Parliament held him in very high esteem". Corcoran was farewelled with a state funeral held at St Francis Xavier's Cathedral, Adelaide, on 8 January, and was buried at North Brighton Cemetery.

== Footnotes ==
Political offices
New title	Deputy Premier of South Australia; 1970–1979	Succeeded by Hugh Hudson
Preceded by Allan Rodda	Minister for Works; 1970–1979	Succeeded by John Wright as Minister for Public Works
Preceded by Don Dunstan	Premier of South Australia; 1979	Succeeded by David Tonkin
Preceded by Don Dunstan	Treasurer of South Australia; 1979	Succeeded by David Tonkin
Parliament of South Australia
Preceded by Jim Corcoran	Member for Millicent; 1962–1975	Succeeded by Murray Vandepeer
Preceded by Len King	Member for Coles; 1975–1977	Succeeded by Jennifer Cashmore
New division	Member for Hartley; 1977–1982	Succeeded by Terry Groom
Party political offices
Preceded by Don Dunstan	Leader of the Australian Labor Party (South Australian Branch); 1979	Succeeded by John Bannon
