= North Brighton Cemetery =

Brighton North Cemetery
- Interactive map of Brighton North Cemetery

Details
- Established: 1858
- Location: 301 Brighton Road, Somerton Park, South Australia, Adelaide, South Australia
- Country: Australia
- Coordinates: 35.0023°S 138.5197°E
- Type: Public
- Owned by: City of Holdfast Bay
- Website: Official website
- Find a Grave: Brighton North Cemetery

The North Brighton Cemetery, operated by the City of Holdfast Bay in Somerton Park had its first burial in 1859.

== Interments ==
- Des Corcoran (1928–2004) politician and soldier
- William Fisk (1871–1940) politician
- Pat Glennon (1927–2004) jockey
- Henry Hamilton (1826–1907) grape-grower and wine-maker and
  - Frank Hamilton (1859–1913) wine-maker
- Reginald Pole Blundell (1871–1945) tobacco-twister, trade unionist and politician
- Arthur Donald McCutcheon (1890–1955) Methodist minister and social worker
- Mabel Mary McCutcheon (1886–1942) nurse
- Paul Moran
- Francis Phillip O'Grady (1900–1981) engineer and public servant
- Catherine Helen Spence and her brother
- John Brodie Spence
- William George Torr (1853–1939) headmaster
