= 1968 Millicent state by-election =

South Australian state by-election

The 1968 Millicent state by-election was a by-election held on 22 June 1968 for the South Australian House of Assembly seat of Millicent.

== Results ==
The by-election was triggered by the Court of Disputed Returns calling a new election. Labor had won the seat by a single vote at the 1968 election. Labor retained the seat with an increased margin. Turnout increased at the by-election.

Millicent state by-election, 22 June 1968
Party	Candidate	Votes	%	±%
Labor	Des Corcoran	3,994	52.5	+2.5
Liberal and Country	Martin Cameron	3,564	46.8	−3.2
Democratic Labor	Douglas Barnes	51	0.7	+0.7
Total formal votes		7,609	99.6	+0.6
Informal votes		34	0.4	−0.6
Turnout		7,643	97.4	+1.4
Labor hold		Swing	N/A	

== See also ==
- List of South Australian state by-elections
