= Karlene Maywald =

Australian politician

The Honourable Karlene Maywald FTSE
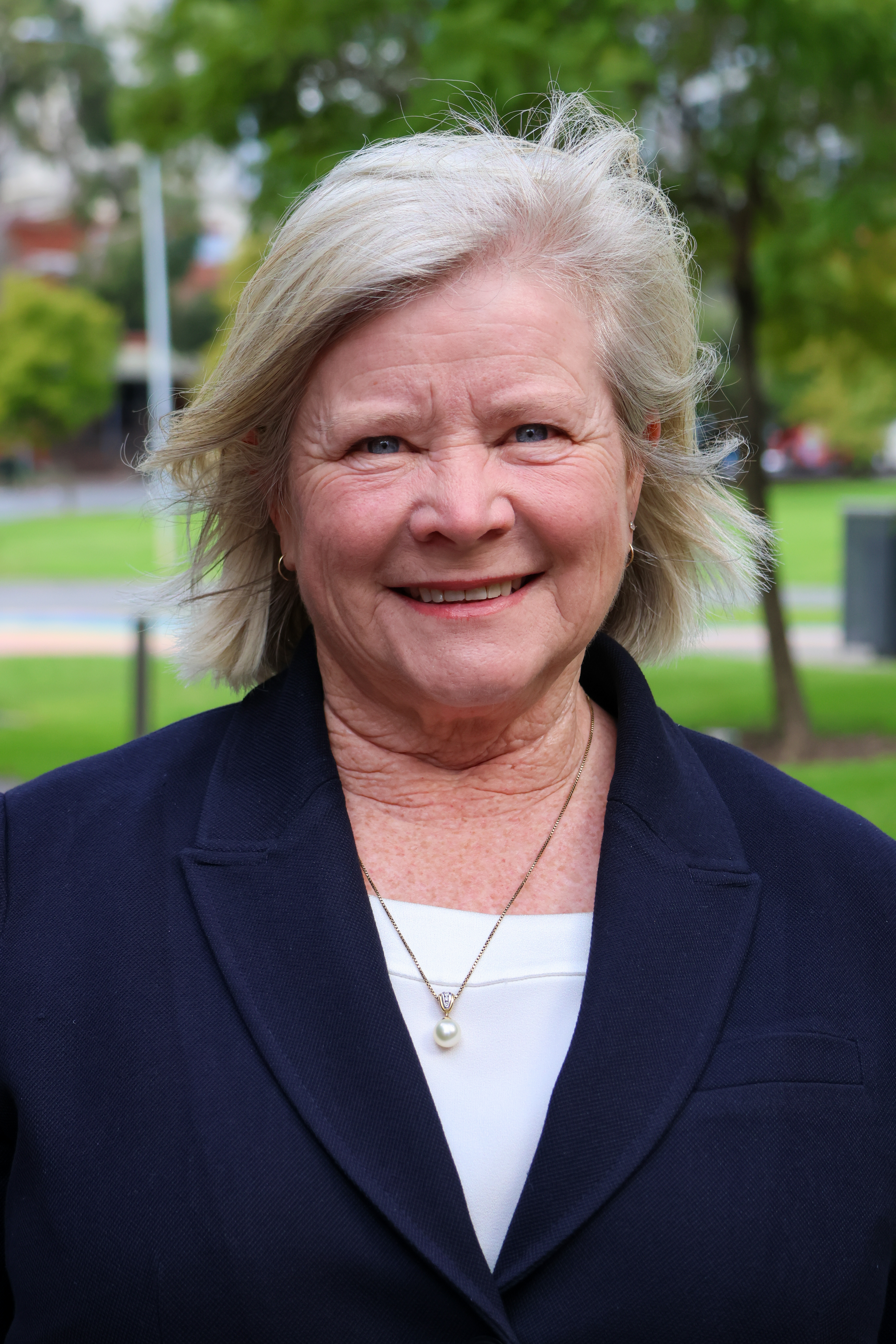
- Maywald in 2026

Chair of the National Water Commission
- In office 1 July 2012 – 16 June 2015
- Preceded by: Chloe Munro
- Succeeded by: Office abolished

Member of the South Australian Parliament for Chaffey
- In office 11 October 1997 – 20 March 2010
- Preceded by: Kent Andrew
- Succeeded by: Tim Whetstone

Personal details
- Born: Karlene Ann Maywald Melbourne, Victoria, Australia
- Party: The Nationals
- Spouse: Dean
- Children: 1
- Education: Flinders University; University of Ballarat
- Occupation: Businessperson
- Karlene Maywald's voice Maywald speaking about climate change Recorded 9 May 2025

Karlene Ann Maywald is an Australian former politician who represented Chaffey in the South Australian House of Assembly from 1997 to 2010. She became the first woman to lead the South Australian National Party and, in 1998, became the first South Australian parliamentarian to give birth while serving in parliament.

Maywald was born in Melbourne and moved with her family to Waikerie, where her family ran a school bus service and where she received her education until she joined Flinders University where she briefly studied politics before embarking on nursing duties in Darwin then returned to Waikerie where she joined the family business. Later, she got into employment in the transport and retail sectors and lived for sometime in Canada where she started a home brewing business and received a Graduate Diploma in Brewing and Malting from Ballarat University. After the death of her father in 1995, she went back to Waikerie to help her mother in the family business.

In the 1997 state election, Maywald joined the South Australian parliament, defeating incumbent Liberal member Kent Andrew and gaining the National Party's Chaffey House of Assembly seat. She became the first woman to lead the South Australian National Party. Re-elected in 2002, she supported the minority Labor government led by Mike Rann and joined its cabinet in July 2004, becoming Minister for the River Murray, Regional Development, Small Business and Consumer Affairs. She retained her National Party membership while serving in the Labor cabinet and was later appointed Minister for Water Security in 2007. Her ministerial responsibilities included water policy during the Millennium Drought and negotiations concerning the River Murray and the Murray–Darling Basin.

In the 2010 state election, Maywald lost to Liberal candidate Tim Whetstone, ending her 12.5-year tenure in parliament. She subsequently worked as a water policy and government relations consultant and held several water-sector positions, including chair of the National Water Commission from 2012 to 2015 and director of SA Water from 2011 to 2018. She also served as Local Recovery Coordinator following the 2015 Sampson Flat bushfire and held roles with the International Centre of Excellence in Water Resources Management and the Peter Cullen Trust. In 2020 she became a director of Cancer Council SA, in 2021 a director of WaterAid International, and in April 2024 chair of the Adelaide Festival Centre Trust.

== Early life and education ==
Karlene Ann Maywald was born in Melbourne and moved with her family to Waikerie at the age of 13, where they operated a school bus business. She completed her schooling in Waikerie before briefly studying politics at Flinders University in Adelaide.

Maywald subsequently worked as a nurse in Darwin for two years, returned to Waikerie to work in the family business, and later entered the transport industry, where she met her husband.

Maywald subsequently worked in the retail industry and spent time in Canada, where she established a business based on the home-brewing model and obtained a Graduate Diploma in Brewing and Malting from Ballarat University. Following her father's death in 1995, she returned to Waikerie to assist her mother in the family business.

== Political career ==
=== Member of Parliament (1997–2002) ===
At the 1997 South Australian state election on 11 October, Maywald was elected to the South Australian House of Assembly for Chaffey as a National Party candidate, defeating the sitting Liberal member Kent Andrew. The result ended Liberal representation of Chaffey, which had been held by the party since 1973, and contributed to the Olsen government's loss of its parliamentary majority. Maywald became the first woman to lead the South Australian National Party.

From 2 December 1997 to 15 January 2002, Maywald served on the Environment, Resources and Development Committee. In 1998, she gave birth to her daughter, becoming the first South Australian parliamentarian to give birth while serving in Parliament.

Maywald served on the Select Committee on the Emergency Services Levy from 27 May 1998 to 3 August 1999 and the Select Committee on the Heroin Rehabilitation Trial from 10 December 1998 to 21 October 1999. She subsequently served on the Select Committee on the Murray River from 18 November 1999 to 25 July 2001 and the Parliamentary Procedures and Practices Committee from 7 December 2000 to 15 January 2002.

=== Ministerial appointments (2002–2008) ===
At the 2002 state election, Maywald was re-elected for Chaffey with 49.2 per cent of the primary vote and an 11.5 per cent two-party-preferred swing. The election produced a minority parliament, and Maywald remained outside government, supporting the Rann government in the first confidence vote.

Maywald subsequently served on the Select Committee on the Crown Lands (Miscellaneous) Amendment Bill from 17 July 2002 to 20 February 2006, the Economic and Finance Committee from 7 May 2002 to 23 July 2004, and the Natural Resources Committee from 3 December 2003 to 23 July 2004.

Maywald joined the Executive Council on 23 July 2004, when Premier Mike Rann named her Minister for the River Murray, Minister for Regional Development, Minister for Small Business, and Minister for Consumer Affairs. Her appointment to cabinet followed speculation that she might contest the federal seat of Barker for the National Party and made her the second non-Labor parliamentarian, after independent Rory McEwen, to serve in a South Australian Labor cabinet.

Maywald retained her membership of the National Party while serving in the Labor cabinet, under an agreement that allowed her to dissent from government decisions and legislation on specified matters, particularly where she considered them to conflict with the interests of the Chaffey electorate or her political position. The arrangement attracted criticism from some Liberal and National Party members, including calls for her expulsion from the Nationals. She exercised her right to dissent on issues including industrial relations, equal opportunity legislation and electoral laws.

From 23 August 2004, Maywald represented South Australia on the Murray–Darling Basin Commission. On 2 December that year, she was appointed a Justice of the Peace for South Australia.

On 23 March 2005, she became Minister for Science and Information Economy, holding the portfolio until 6 February 2007. She remained in cabinet following Labor's victory at the 2006 state election, at which she increased her primary vote to 53.2 per cent. On 23 March 2006, she relinquished Consumer Affairs and became Minister Assisting the Minister for Industry and Trade.

On 14 December 2006, she was appointed Acting Minister for the Status of Women for 24 December during the absence of Jennifer Rankine. On 6 February 2007, she became Minister for Water Security, while continuing as Minister for the River Murray.

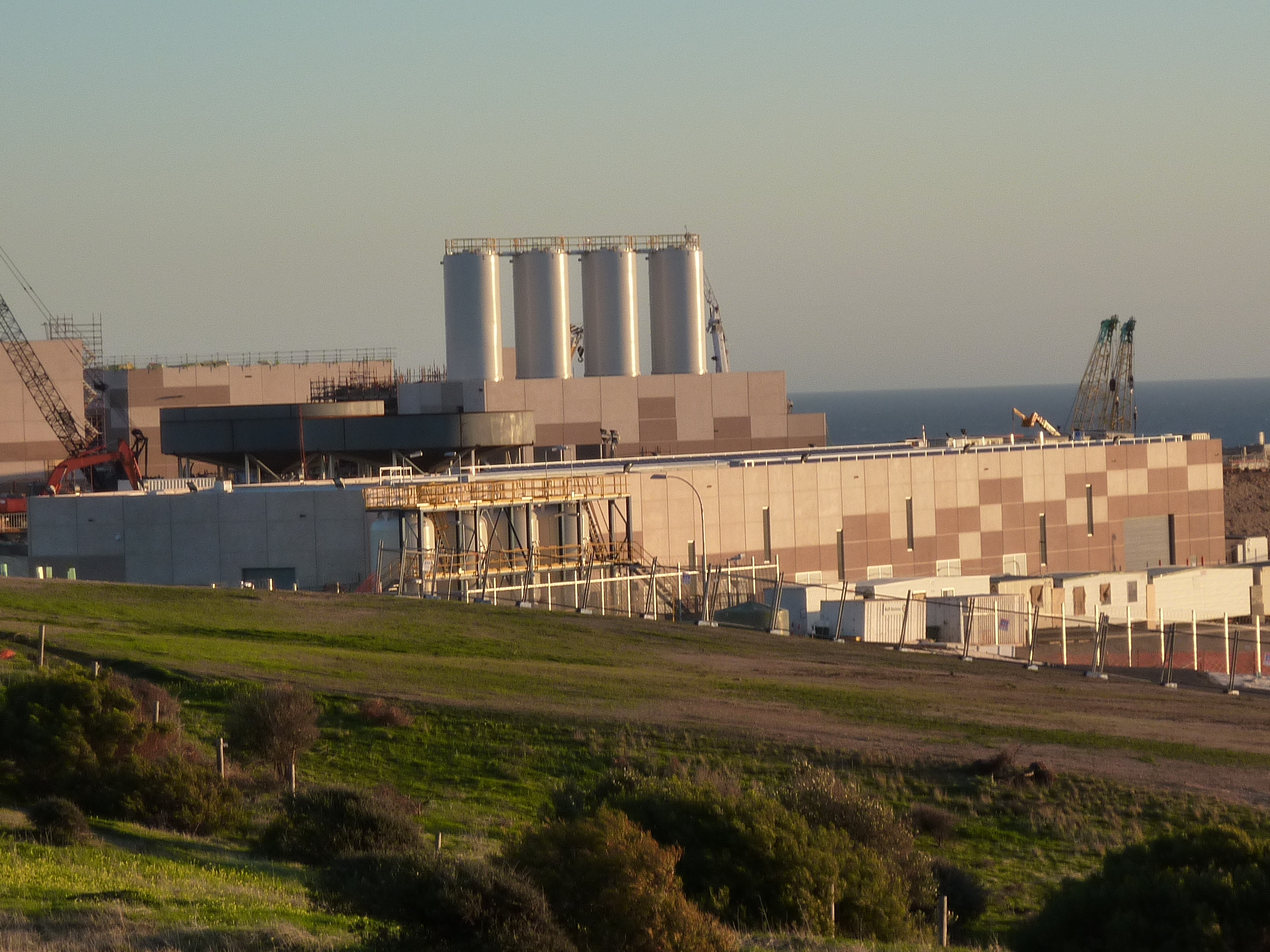
The Adelaide Desalination Plant under construction in July 2010

As Minister for the River Murray and later Minister for Water Security, Maywald was responsible for water policy during the Millennium Drought, including reduced River Murray allocations, negotiations over upstream water flows and planning for the Port Stanvac desalination plant. The drought affected irrigators and communities in the Riverland, and Maywald identified reduced water allocations, lower commodity prices and the high value of the Australian dollar as factors affecting the region. She was also involved in policy discussions that preceded the Murray–Darling Basin Plan.

=== River Murray and water policy (2008–2010) ===
On 5 February 2008, Opposition Leader Martin Hamilton-Smith called for Maywald to resign as Minister for the River Murray after irrigation water allocations were set at 32 per cent. On 27 March, Maywald welcomed the Council of Australian Governments' approval of the National Water Plan following Victoria's decision to adopt it, and advocated measures to improve irrigation efficiency, address water over-allocation, restore environmental flows and secure water supplies for communities. She also supported establishing an independent Murray–Darling Basin Authority to advise the Commonwealth Water Minister.

On 22 April, she attended community meetings in Berri and Waikerie to discuss drought response measures and water management. On 3 July, she criticised Victoria's position on water sharing in the Murray–Darling basin, arguing that water distribution should be managed in the national interest; at the time, South Australian irrigation communities were receiving 2 per cent of their water allocation, while irrigators in New South Wales and Victoria had no allocation.

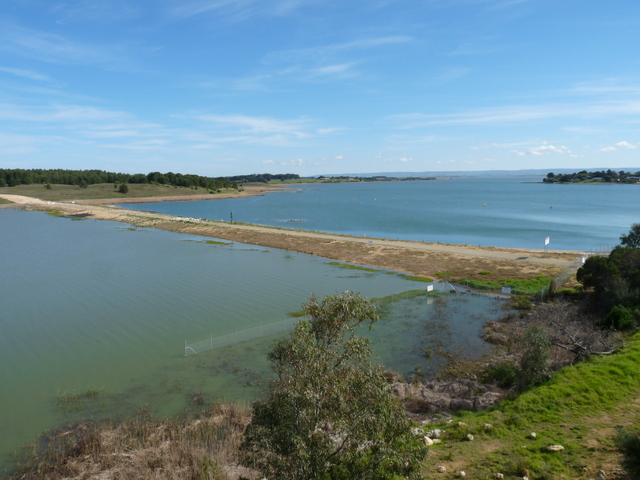
Clayton Regulator on Lake Alexandrina in July 2010. Alexandrina and the adjoining Lake Albert are collectively known as the Lower Lakes.

On 24 July 2008, Maywald relinquished Regional Development, Small Business and her role assisting the Minister for Industry and Trade, retaining the River Murray and Water Security portfolios. On 6 August, she attended a public hearing at Meningie concerning a proposed weir at Wellington intended to address declining water levels in the Lower Lakes, where community opposition to the project was expressed; more than $30 million had already been spent by the South Australian government on preparations for the project.

On 24 March 2009, Maywald served on the committee considering the Renmark Irrigation Trust Bill. On 28 April, she adopted the Regional Natural Resources Management Plan following consultation with the regional community; it came into effect on 1 July 2009, replacing the initial plan and providing the basis for natural resources management activities in the region. On 1 September, Maywald announced that South Australian River Murray water licence holders would be permitted to extract 10 per cent of their water entitlements, up from 5 per cent, following increased inflows during August.

On 19 February 2010, a poll of 571 voters in Chaffey recorded a two-party-preferred result of 50.5 per cent for Maywald and 49.5 per cent for Liberal candidate Tim Whetstone; the primary vote was reported as 40 per cent for Whetstone, 30 per cent for Maywald, 14 per cent for Labor, 11 per cent for Family First and 3 per cent for the Greens. At the 20 March 2010 state election, Maywald was defeated by Whetstone, with a swing against her of more than 20 per cent. Maywald attributed the result partly to dissatisfaction in the Riverland over the government's handling of the River Murray during the drought, noting that her position as a minister had placed her at the centre of criticism. She left the ministry and stated that she did not intend to seek political office again. She also expressed concern that the Riverland might no longer have a parliamentarian directly involved in negotiations over the River Murray and the Murray–Darling Basin Plan. Her defeat ended her 12½-year career in the South Australian parliament.

== Post-parliamentary career ==
=== Water policy and recovery roles (2010–2018) ===
Following her defeat at the 2010 state election, Maywald became managing director of Maywald Consultants, providing advice on water policy and government relations. In December 2010, she was considered for the position of chair of the Murray–Darling Basin Authority following Mike Taylor's resignation, and Water Minister Paul Caica supported her candidacy.

On 1 May 2011, Maywald joined the SA Water Board as a non-executive director, with her term initially running until 30 June 2013, and also became a member of an advisory committee to the Murray–Darling Basin Authority.

On 1 July 2012, Maywald was appointed chair of the National Water Commission, which monitored implementation of the Murray–Darling Basin Plan and the performance of the Basin states against agreed targets.

Maywald went on to serve as the director of SA Water from 2014 to 2018. Following the federal government's decision to abolish the commission in that same year, Maywald argued that water reform should continue.

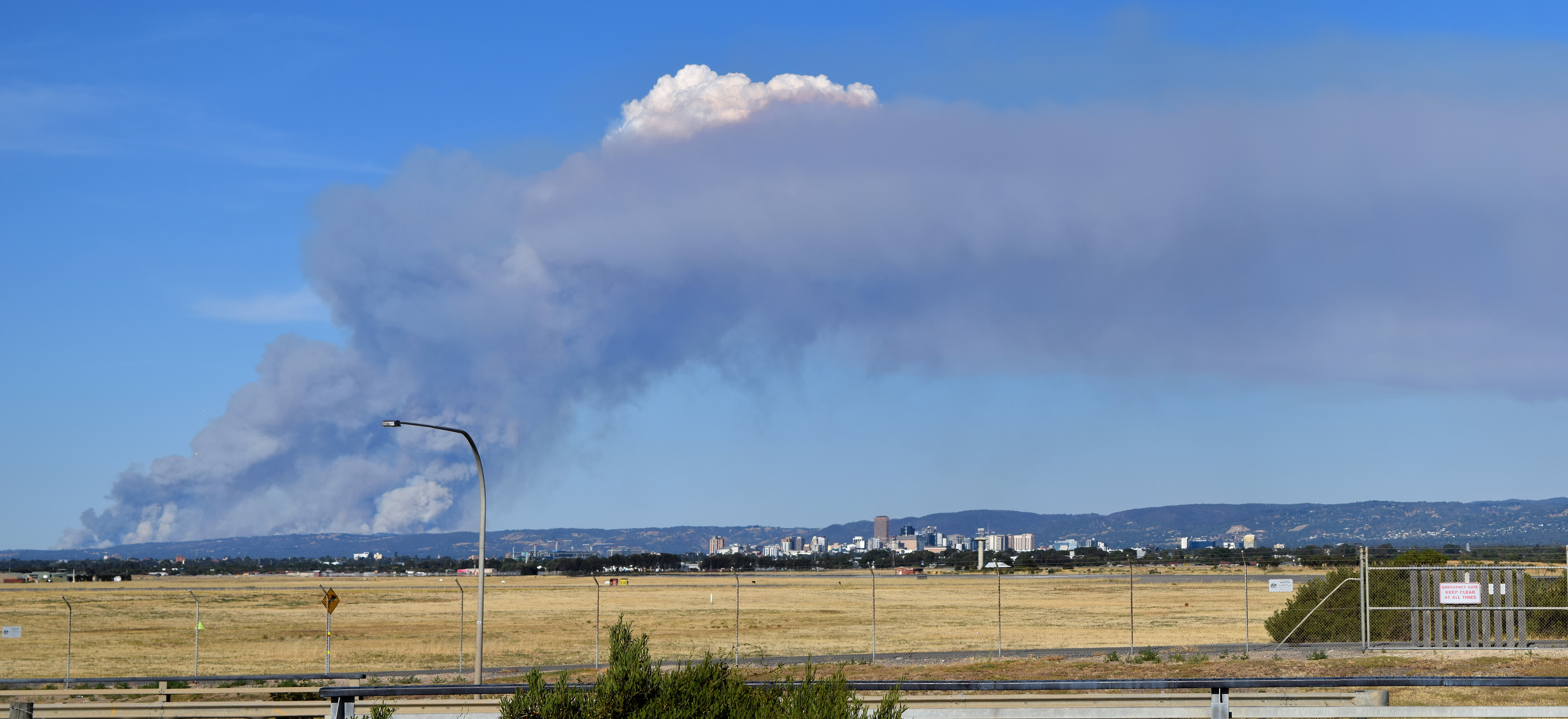
Smoke from the Sampson Flat bushfires on 2 January 2015

On 9 January 2015, Maywald was appointed Local Recovery Coordinator by the South Australian Government following the Sampson Flat bushfire in the Adelaide Hills. She coordinated the recovery response among affected communities, local and state government agencies, councils, non-government organisations and volunteers, with responsibilities including community wellbeing, infrastructure restoration, economic recovery and environmental rehabilitation. Early recovery activities included livestock management, fence repairs and insurance matters, while more than 1,300 volunteers registered during the first week. She had previously served as the duty minister during the 2005 Eyre Peninsula bushfires.

Maywald remained chair of the National Water Commission towards its abolishment in June 2015. Later that year, the Weatherill ministry appointed Maywald as Strategic Adviser–Water Opportunities on an external consultancy basis, with responsibility for promoting South Australia's water-management capabilities in international markets, including India and China. Maywald also began chairing the International Centre of Excellence in Water Resources Management from 2015 to 2021.

In 2018, Maywald's term as a director of SA Water ended following the change of government at the state election. She said she had not sought reappointment and had notified the Marshall government after applications to renew board appointments were issued. She continued working as a consultant to the International Centre of Excellence in Water Resources Management.

=== Board appointments and international work (2020–present) ===
On 14 February 2020, she was appointed a director of Cancer Council SA, serving as board chair, chair of the Nomination and Remuneration Committee, and a member of the Investment Committee.

On 19 August 2021, Maywald was appointed a director of WaterAid International. In July 2022, she led a delegation to Rajasthan, India, where she met state officials to discuss cooperation in groundwater management and water purification and was involved in establishing the Rajasthan Centre of Excellence for Water Resources Management. She served as chair of the Peter Cullen Trust for more than four years before resigning at the conclusion of its February 2024 board meeting.

On 19 April 2024, she was appointed chair of the Adelaide Festival Centre Trust, succeeding former South Australian Governor Hieu Van Le. She also held positions with GPEx and Flinders University New Venture.

== Personal life ==
Maywald and her husband, Dean, had a daughter, Tilly Rose, in 1998. Dean cared for their daughter while continuing his transport business.

== Recognitions and awards ==
Maywald was given the entitlement to be titled "The Honourable" was published in the gazette on 20 May 2010. She was also elected a Fellow of the Academy of Technological Sciences and Engineering (FTSE) in 2012. In May 2014, she received the Chairman's Award from the Water Industry Alliance for her contribution to the water industry in South Australia and nationally. In 2015, Flinders University conferred on her the degree of Doctor of the University for her service to the community through public policy.

Political offices
Preceded by John Hill	Minister for the River Murray; 2004–2010	Succeeded by Paul Caica
Preceded by Michael Atkinson	Minister for Consumer Affairs; 2004–2006	Succeeded by Jennifer Rankine
Vacant Title last held by Rob Kerin (2001)	Minister for Regional Development; 2004–2008	Succeeded by Gail Gago
Preceded by Rory McEwen	Minister for Small Business; 2004–2008	Succeeded by Paul Holloway
Preceded by Mike Rann	Minister for Science and Information Economy; 2005–2007	Succeeded by Paul Caica
Preceded by Carmel Zollo	Minister Assisting the Minister for Industry and Trade; 2006–2008	Succeeded by Ministry abolished
Vacant Title last held by Mark Brindal (2002) as Minister for Water Resources	Minister for Water Security; 2007–2010	Succeeded by Paul Caica as Minister for Water
Parliament of South Australia
Preceded by Kent Andrew	Member for Chaffey; 1997–2010	Succeeded by Tim Whetstone
