= Gordon Gilfillan =

Australian pastoralist and politician

Gordon James Gilfillan (15 May 1916 – 15 September 1982) was a pastoralist and politician in the State of South Australia.

Gordon was the elder son of Mr. and Mrs. James Gilfillan, farmers of Jamestown.

He was president of the Burra branch of the Liberal and Country League was Mayor of the Corporate Town of Jamestown from 1959 to 1962, and stood unsuccessfully for the seat of Electoral district of Burra in the House of Assembly in 1959.

He was a Liberal member of the Legislative Council for the Northern district from March 1962 to July 1975.

== Family ==
Gordon Gilfillan married Catherine Rebecca "Cath" Gribble of Jamestown on 28 October 1939. They moved to a home in Belalie East. They had four children, Dianne, Rodney, Janice and Grant.
