= Peter Arnold (politician) =

Australian politician (1935–2024)

Peter Bruce Arnold (21 December 1935 – 23 October 2024) was an Australian politician who represented the South Australian House of Assembly seat of Chaffey for the Liberal and Country League and Liberal Party from 1968 to 1970 and 1973 to 1993. He was appointed to the Parliamentary Standing Committee on Public Works and later on the Environment, Resources and Development Committee. Arnold was born on 21 December 1935, and died on 23 October 2024, at the age of 88.

Political offices
Preceded by Ron Payne	Minister for Water Resources; 1979–1982	Succeeded by Jack Slater
Preceded by Tom Casey	Minister for Irrigation; 1979–1982	Ministry abolished
Preceded by John Cornwall	Minister for Lands; 1979–1982	Succeeded by Don Hopgood
Preceded by John Cornwall	Minister for Repatriation; 1979–1982	Succeeded by Don Hopgood
Preceded by Harold Allison	Minister for Aboriginal Affairs; 1982	Succeeded by Greg Crafter
Parliament of South Australia
Preceded by Reg Curren	Member for Chaffey; 1968–1970	Succeeded by Reg Curren
Preceded by Reg Curren	Member for Chaffey; 1973–1993	Succeeded by Kent Andrew
