= Murray Vandepeer =

Australian politician

Murray Sumsion Vandepeer (c. 1929 – 14 September 2008) was an Australian politician who represented the South Australian House of Assembly seat of Millicent from 1975 to 1977 for the Liberal Party.

Parliament of South Australia
Preceded by Des Corcoran	Member for Millicent; 1975–1977	Seat abolished
