= Reg Curren =

Australian politician

Arthur Reginald Curren (27 June 1914 – 25 September 1996) was an Australian politician who represented the South Australian House of Assembly seat of Chaffey for the Labor Party from 1962 to 1968 and 1970 to 1973.

Parliament of South Australia
Preceded by Harold King	Member for Chaffey; 1962–1968	Succeeded by Peter Arnold
Preceded by Peter Arnold	Member for Chaffey; 1970–1973	Succeeded by Peter Arnold
