= Kent Andrew =

Australian politician

Kent Ashley Andrew was an Australian politician who represented the South Australian House of Assembly seat of Chaffey from 1993 to 1997 for the Liberal Party.

South Australian House of Assembly
Preceded by Peter Arnold	Member for Chaffey; 1993–1997	Succeeded by Karlene Maywald
