= William MacGillivray (politician) =

Australian politician

William MacGillivray (14 December 1891 – 15 November 1975) was an Australian politician. He was an independent member of the South Australian House of Assembly from 1938 to 1956, representing the electorate of Chaffey.

MacGillivray was born at Inverness in Scotland, the son of a blacksmith. He fought with the Royal Horse Artillery in Egypt and Palestine during World War I, but suffered badly from malaria when he returned home. He migrated to South Australia in 1922, taking advantage of a free passage offered to returned soldiers and hoping that the climate would improve his health. He thereafter became a fruitgrower at Barmera. He also served as chairman of the District Council of Cobdogla.

MacGillivray was elected to the Legislative Assembly at the 1938 election, at which independent candidates won 14 of 39 seats and 40 percent of the primary vote, more than either of the major parties. MacGillivray was eventually defeated by Liberal and Country League candidate Harold King at the 1956 election after the LCL and the Labor Party exchanged preferences in order to dislodge him, a decision that saw an "intense struggle" within the LCL at the time. He had been seen as a "bitter critic" of the policies of the Playford LCL government.

Parliament of South Australia
New seat	Member for Chaffey; 1938–1956	Succeeded by Harold King
