= Leslie Harding =

Australian politician

Leslie Charles Harding (3 August 1895 – 15 March 1979) was an Australian politician who represented the South Australian House of Assembly seat of Victoria from 1956 to 1965 for the Liberal and Country League.

Parliament of South Australia
Preceded by Jim Corcoran	Member for Victoria; 1956–1965	Succeeded by Allan Rodda
