= Jim Corcoran (politician) =

South Australian politician

James Corcoran (1 October 1885 – 7 May 1965) was a South Australian politician. He was the Labor member for Victoria in the South Australian House of Assembly from 1945 until his defeat in 1947, and again from 1953 until 1956, when he transferred to the nearby seat of Millicent. He retired in 1962, and was succeeded by his son, future Premier Des Corcoran.

== Early life and military service ==
Born on 1 October 1885 at Mount Gambier in the colony of South Australia, the first-born son of Thomas Corcoran and Margaret (née Fitzgerald) of Tantanoola, James Corcoran attended Burrungule Public School and Mount Gambier Grammar School. His father was employed by South Australian Railways (SAR) when he married Margaret at Georgetown in the mid-north of the colony, where her parents were farming. The couple subsequently moved to Mount Gambier with SAR, and around 1914 Thomas retired from that work and the couple settled at Tantanoola. They had a total of three daughters and six sons. After he left school James was a pastoral worker on Coola Station near Mount Gambier before half-a-dozen years working for SAR himself. In 1914 he returned home to assist in the running of his parents' dairy farm at Tantanoola. He enlisted for service with the Australian Imperial Force (AIF) on 15 September 1915, aged 29. Before embarking he underwent training as a non-commissioned officer, and was provisionally promoted to corporal. Corcoran embarked with the 11th reinforcement draft for the largely South Australia-raised 27th Battalion on 25 March 1916, and after further training in England and substantive promotion to corporal and promotion to the acting rank of lance sergeant, he joined the 27th Battalion on the Western Front in France and Belgium on 13 May 1917, at which time he reverted to his substantive rank of corporal. The following month he was evacuated sick, and did not rejoin the battalion until October.

While Corcoran was with the battalion, it participated in the response to the German spring offensive launched in mid-March 1918, playing a supporting role during the Second Battle of Villers-Bretonneux in late April, then a major role in the successful Third Battle of Morlancourt on 10 June. After his unit performed a supporting role in the highly successful Battle of Hamel on 4 July, Corcoran suffered gunshot wounds to the back and leg on 8 August during the Battle of Amiens, and was again evacuated to England. He was furloughed from hospital in mid-November, after the Armistice, and embarked to return to Australia in mid-December. Arriving back in Adelaide on 13 February 1919, he was discharged on 27 April. His younger brothers Thomas Leo, Matthew Linus, and John Joseph, also served during the war, with Thomas Leo being commissioned as a lieutenant, awarded the Military Cross and mentioned in despatches, and killed in action in May 1918.

Corcoran returned to a mixed farming venture at Tantanoola, and was elected as a member of the District Council of Tantanoola in 1920–1921. When the council clerk, Malcolm Cameron, was elected to the Australian House of Representatives in 1922, Corcoran applied for and secured the position as council clerk. At the same time he continued to run a small sheep and lamb pastoral property at Tantanoola. He was appointed as a justice of the peace and was president of the Tantanoola sub-branch of the Returned Sailors and Soldiers Imperial League of Australia (RSSILA) until it closed, and was the vice-president of the Millicent sub-branch of RSSILA in 1932. During this period he was also president of the Tantanoola Show Society and the Children's Home Project Club, and a member of the local school committee. Through these and other activities, by 1932 he was well known to the people of the lower southeast of the state.

== Political career ==
Following his unsuccessful attempt to be elected to the two-member electoral district of Victoria in the South Australian House of Assembly in a by-election in 1932, Jim Corcoran was also an unsuccessful candidate for the same, now single-member, district in the state elections of 1933 and 1944, before finally prevailing in a by-election in September 1945. His mother Margaret died in October 1933. James was unsuccessful in his bid to be re-elected in the 1947 state election, and was unsuccessful again in the 1950 state election.

While Des was still serving in Korea, his father Jim was again elected to the district of Victoria in the March 1953 state election. At the 1956 state election, Jim Corcoran successfully contested the new electoral district of Millicent which had been excised from the district of Victoria as part of a redistribution, and successfully defended it in the 1959 state election.

Des Corcoran left the Army in 1961 and in the 3 March 1962 state election was elected to the House of Assembly, succeeding his father as the member for Millicent. Jim died on 7 May 1965.

== Footnotes ==
Parliament of South Australia
Preceded by Vernon Petherick	Member for Victoria; 1945–1947	Succeeded by Roy McLachlan
Preceded by Roy McLachlan	Member for Victoria; 1953–1956	Succeeded by Leslie Harding
New district	Member for Millicent; 1956–1962	Succeeded by Des Corcoran
