= Electoral district of Chaffey =

South Australian state electoral district

Chaffey South Australia—House of Assembly
- Interactive map of electoral district boundaries from the 2022 state election (Note: The electorate will have no change in boundaries at the 2026 state election.)
- State: South Australia
- Created: 1938
- MP: Tim Whetstone
- Party: Liberal
- Namesake: George Chaffey and William Chaffey
- Electors: 26,677 (2026)
- Area: 30,124 km^{2} (11,630.9 sq mi)
- Demographic: Rural
- Coordinates: 34°32′16″S 140°16′14″E
Electorates around Chaffey:
Stuart	Stuart	N. S. W.
Ngadjuri Schubert	Chaffey	N. S. W. Victoria
Hammond	MacKillop	Victoria

Chaffey, created in 1936, is a single-member electoral district for the South Australian House of Assembly. It covers the Riverland region of South Australia including the towns of Renmark, Berri, Barmera, Loxton and Waikerie. The seat is named after brothers George and William Chaffey who established the irrigation area along the Murray River from 1886.

== History ==
Chaffey spent most of the Playmander era in the hands of independent William MacGillivray. The Liberal and Country League did not win it until 1956. Chaffey was won three times by Labor's Reg Curren as their most marginal electorate on a two-party-preferred basis – in 1962 on 50.1%, 1965 on 50.7% and 1970 on 50.2%. Curren's 1965 victory helped put Labor in government in 1965 after 33 years in opposition, while his loss to the LCL's Peter Arnold was one of two Labor losses that returned the LCL to government in 1968. Curren reclaimed it for Labor during his party's 1970 landslide victory after the end of the Playmander, only to lose it back to Arnold in 1973. At the 1975 election, Arnold picked up a massive 13.5 percent swing, and Labor has never come close to winning it since. Chaffey was one of several rural electorates where Labor suffered large swings in 1975; Labor suffered a swing of 15.5 percent in Mount Gambier and a 16.4 percent in Millicent.

Chaffey remained in the hands of the LCL and its successor, the Liberal Party, until 1997 when Karlene Maywald narrowly won it for the SA Nationals. Maywald picked up a large swing in 2002, boosting her two-candidate preferred vote to 64 percent. She held the electorate without serious difficulty until she was defeated in 2010 by Liberal Tim Whetstone, who still holds the seat.

== Members for Chaffey ==
Member	Party	Term
William MacGillivray	Independent	1938–1956
Harold King	Liberal and Country	1956–1962
Reg Curren	Labor	1962–1968
Peter Arnold	Liberal and Country	1968–1970
Reg Curren	Labor	1970–1973
Peter Arnold	Liberal and Country	1973–1974
Peter Arnold	Liberal	1974–1993
Kent Andrew	Liberal	1993–1997
Karlene Maywald	Nationals SA	1997–2010
Tim Whetstone	Liberal	2010–present

== Election results ==
2026 South Australian state election: Chaffey
Party	Candidate	Votes	%	±%
Liberal	Tim Whetstone	7,839	35.4	−19.2
One Nation	Jenny Troeth	7,506	33.9	+24.0
Labor	Oscar Harding	3,420	15.4	−4.5
Greens	Alice Kuersch	1,018	4.6	−1.4
Independent	Jason Perrin	842	3.8	+3.8
Australian Family	Tim Oakley	593	2.7	+2.7
Legalise Cannabis	Jeff Knipe	550	2.5	+2.5
National	Imelda Adamson Agars	190	0.9	−4.8
Independent	Jakob Gamertsfelder	183	0.8	+0.8
Total formal votes		22,141	94.2	−1.3
Informal votes		1,367	5.8	+1.3
Turnout		23,508	88.1	−1.4
Two-candidate-preferred result
Liberal	Tim Whetstone	12,392	56.0	−11.2
One Nation	Jenny Troeth	9,749	44.0	+44.0
Liberal hold				
