= Electoral district of Millicent =

Former South Australian electoral district

Millicent South Australia—House of Assembly
- State: South Australia
- Created: 1956
- Abolished: 1977
- Namesake: Millicent, South Australia
- Demographic: Rural
- Coordinates: 37°50′S 140°21′E

Millicent was an electoral district of the House of Assembly in the Australian state of South Australia from 1956 to 1977.

Based on the town of Millicent, the seat was carved out of the south of the seat of Victoria. It was held by Labor as a marginal to safe seat until the 1975 election with the seat won by the Liberals as a fairly safe seat for one term until it was abolished, with the town of Millicent absorbed back into the seat of Victoria. Its best-known holder was Des Corcoran, who served as Deputy Premier under Don Dunstan.

A redistribution ahead of the 1975 election made Millicent notionally Liberal, prompting Corcoran to transfer to Coles. That move proved prescient, as Murray Vandepeer took the seat for the Liberals on a swing of 16.4 percent. Millicent was one of several country seats that saw large swings away from Labor at that election; others included Chaffey (13.5 percent) and Mount Gambier (15.5 percent).

The town of Millicent is currently located in the seat of MacKillop, which replaced Victoria in 1993.

== Members ==
Member	Party	Term
Jim Corcoran	Labor	1956–1962
Des Corcoran	Labor	1962–1975
Murray Vandepeer	Liberal	1975–1977

== See also ==
- 1968 Millicent state by-election
