= Harold King (politician) =

Australian politician

Harold Welbourn King (11 July 1906 – 24 August 1983) was an Australian politician who represented the South Australian House of Assembly seat of Chaffey for the Liberal and Country League from 1956 to 1962.

King had been a bank official, packing shed executive and fruitgrower before entering politics. He was elected to the Legislative Assembly at the 1956 election, defeating 18-year independent incumbent and government critic William MacGillivray after the LCL exchanged preferences with Labor to oust MacGillivray. King was defeated by Labor candidate Reg Curren at the 1962 election, and lost a rematch with Curren at the 1965 election.

Parliament of South Australia
Preceded by William McGillivray	Member for Chaffey; 1956–1962	Succeeded by Reg Curren
