= Candidates of the 1953 South Australian state election =

The 1953 South Australian state election was held on 7 March 1953.

== Retiring Members ==
=== Labor ===
- Richard McKenzie, MHA (Murray)

=== Liberal and Country ===
- Shirley Jeffries, MHA (Torrens)

== House of Assembly ==
Sitting members are shown in bold text. Successful candidates are highlighted in the relevant colour. Where there is possible confusion, an asterisk (*) is also used.

| Electorate | Held by | Labor candidate | LCL candidate | Other candidates |
|---|---|---|---|---|
| Adelaide | Labor | **Sam Lawn** | | Edward Robertson (Comm) |
| Albert | LCL | | **Malcolm McIntosh** | Robert Upton (Ind); Carl Muller (Ind) |
| Alexandra | LCL | | **David Brookman** | |
| Angas | LCL | | **Berthold Teusner** | Henry Schneider (Ind) |
| Burnside | LCL | Frederick Hansford | **Geoffrey Clarke** | John Parkinson (Ind) |
| Burra | LCL | Even George | **George Hawker** | |
| Chaffey | Independent | | Ross Story | **William MacGillivray** (Ind) |
| Eyre | LCL | | **Arthur Christian** | Herbert Hogan (Ind) |
| Flinders | LCL | Percy Baillie | **Glen Pearson** | |
| Frome | Labor | **Mick O'Halloran** | | |
| Gawler | Labor | **John Clark** | | Frank Rieck (Ind) |
| Glenelg | LCL | Loftus Fenwick | **Baden Pattinson** | |
| Goodwood | Labor | **Frank Walsh** | Howard Zelling | |
| Gouger | LCL | Bernard McEwen | **Rufus Goldney** | |
| Gumeracha | LCL | | **Thomas Playford** | Alan Finger (Comm) |
| Hindmarsh | Labor | **Cyril Hutchens** | | |
| Light | LCL | Donald MacLeod | **Herbert Michael** | |
| Mitcham | LCL | | **Henry Dunks** | |
| Mount Gambier | Independent | Raphael Mahony | | **John Fletcher** (Ind) |
| Murray | Labor | Robert Moroney | Hector White | Lawrence McKenzie (Ind); Albert Denman (Ind) |
| Newcastle | LCL | Gerald Travers | **George Jenkins** | |
| Norwood | LCL | Don Dunstan | **Roy Moir** | |
| Onkaparinga | LCL | Frank Staniford | **Howard Shannon** | |
| Port Adelaide | Labor | **James Stephens** | | Peter Symon (Comm) |
| Port Pirie | Labor | **Charles Davis** | | Arthur Pickering (Ind); Thomas Madigan (Ind) |
| Prospect | LCL | Jack Jennings | **Elder Whittle** | |
| Ridley | Independent | | | **Tom Stott** (Ind.); Henry Schneider (Ind.) |
| Rocky River | LCL | | **James Heaslip** | |
| Semaphore | Labor | **Harold Tapping** | | Roy Luckman (Ind.) |
| Stanley | Independent | | Elliot Parker | **Percy Quirke** |
| Stirling | LCL | | **William Jenkins** | William McAnaney (Ind.); Orlando Hutchinson (Ind.) |
| Stuart | Labor | **Lindsay Riches** | | Elliott Johnston (Comm) |
| Thebarton | Labor | **Fred Walsh** | | |
| Torrens | LCL | Thomas Sexton | Leo Travers | |
| Unley | LCL | Arthur Savage | **Colin Dunnage** | |
| Victoria | LCL | Jim Corcoran | **Roy McLachlan** | |
| Wallaroo | Labor | **Hughie McAlees** | | |
| Yorke Peninsula | LCL | | **Cecil Hincks** | |
| Young | LCL | | **Robert Nicholls** | |

== Legislative Council ==
Sitting members are shown in bold text. Successful candidates are highlighted in the relevant colour and identified by an asterisk (*).

| District | Held by | Labor candidates | LCL candidates | Other candidates |
|---|---|---|---|---|
| Central No. 1 | 2 Labor | **Ken Bardolph***; **Stan Bevan*** | | |
| Central No. 2 | 2 LCL | Patience Howard; Leslie Wright | **Collier Cudmore***; **Ernest Anthoney*** | |
| Midland | 2 LCL | | **Alexander Melrose***; **Colin Rowe*** | |
| Northern | 2 LCL | C R Hannan; G L O'Brien | **William Robinson***; **Robert Wilson*** | |
| Southern | 2 LCL | | **Jack Bice***; **John Cowan*** | Frank Halleday (Ind.) |
