= Candidates of the 1956 South Australian state election =

The 1956 South Australian state election was held on 3 March 1956.

== Retiring Members ==
=== Labor ===
- Hughie McAlees, MHA (Wallaroo)
- Bert Hoare, MLC (Central No.1)

=== Liberal and Country ===
- Herbert Michael, MHA (Light)
- George Jenkins, MHA (Newcastle)
- John Travers, MHA (Torrens)
- Robert Nicholls, MHA (Young)
- James Sandford, MLC (Central No.2)

== House of Assembly ==
Sitting members are shown in bold text. Successful candidates are highlighted in the relevant colour. Where there is possible confusion, an asterisk (*) is also used.

Electorate	Held by	Labor candidate	LCL candidate	Labor (A-C) candidate	Other candidates
Adelaide	Labor	**Sam Lawn**		James O'Sullivan	Edward Robertson (Comm)
Albert	LCL		**Malcolm McIntosh**		
Alexandra	LCL		**David Brookman**		
Angas	LCL		**Berthold Teusner**		William Viney (Ind.)
Barossa	LCL		Condor Laucke		
Burnside	LCL		**Geoffrey Clarke**		
Burra	LCL		**George Hawker**		Percy Quirke
Chaffey	Independent	Robert Curren	Harold King		**William MacGillivray** (Ind.); William Napier (Ind.)
Edwardstown	Labor	**Frank Walsh**		Patrick Tippins	
Enfield	Labor	**Jack Jennings**	Betty Preston	Charles Matthews	
Eyre	LCL		George Bockelberg		Herbert Hogan (Ind.); George Simpson (Ind.)
Flinders	LCL		**Glen Pearson**		
Frome	Labor	**Mick O'Halloran**	Raymond McAuley	Michael Hoare	
Gawler	Labor	**John Clark**			
Glenelg	LCL	Loftus Fenwick	**Baden Pattinson**	Peter Lasarewitch	
Gouger	LCL		**Rufus Goldney**		Hector Henstridge (Ind.)
Gumeracha	LCL		**Thomas Playford**		Fred Slater (Comm)
Hindmarsh	Labor	**Cyril Hutchens**			
Light	LCL		George Hambour		
Millicent	Labor	**Jim Corcoran**	William Gordon		
Mitcham	LCL		**Robin Millhouse**		
Mount Gambier	Independent	Ron Ralston			**John Fletcher** (Ind.)
Murray	LCL	Gabe Bywaters	**Hector White**		
Norwood	Labor	**Don Dunstan**	Roy Moir	John Parkinson	
Onkaparinga	LCL	Cyril Hasse	**Howard Shannon**		Frank Rieck (Ind.)
Port Adelaide	Labor	**James Stephens**		Brian Crowe	Alan Finger (Comm)
Port Pirie	Labor	**Charles Davis**			
Ridley	Independent	Arnold Busbridge	Cyril Tunbridge		**Tom Stott** (Ind.)
Rocky River	LCL		**James Heaslip**		
Semaphore	Labor	**Harold Tapping**			
Stirling	LCL		**William Jenkins**		
Stuart	Labor	**Lindsay Riches**			
Torrens	LCL	George Seager	John Coumbe	Olaf Alland	
Unley	LCL	Cyril Hasse	**Colin Dunnage**	Francis Ryan	
Victoria	LCL	Victor Sparrow	**Leslie Harding**		
Wallaroo	Labor	Robert Butler	Leslie Heath		Arthur Clarke (Ind.)
West Torrens	Labor	**Fred Walsh**	Frank Potter	Patrick McEwen	
Whyalla	Labor	**Ron Loveday**			
Yorke Peninsula	LCL		**Cecil Hincks**		

== Legislative Council ==
Sitting members are shown in bold text. Successful candidates are highlighted in the relevant colour and identified by an asterisk (*).

District	Held by	Labor candidates	LCL candidates	Other candidates
Central No. 1	2 Labor	**Frank Condon***; Bert Shard*		
Central No. 2	2 LCL		**Frank Perry***; Arthur Rymill*	
Midland	2 LCL		**Walter Duncan***; **Ross Story***	
Northern	2 LCL	Percy Baillie; A Hearne	**Lyell McEwin***; **Harry Edmonds***	D Smith (Labor (A-C)); L J Redden (Labor (A-C))
Southern	2 LCL		**Leslie Densley***; **Norman Jude***	
