= Candidates of the 1950 South Australian state election =

The 1950 South Australian state election was held on 4 March 1950.

== Retiring Members ==
=== Labor ===
- Herbert George, MHA (Adelaide)
- John McInnes, MHA (Hindmarsh)
- Robert Richards, MHA (Wallaroo)

== House of Assembly ==
Sitting members are shown in bold text. Successful candidates are highlighted in the relevant colour. Where there is possible confusion, an asterisk (*) is also used.

Electorate	Held by	Labor candidate	LCL candidate	Other candidates
Adelaide	Labor	Sam Lawn		Bert Edwards (Ind.); Doug Bardolph (Ind.); W J Welsh (Ind.)
Albert	LCL		**Malcolm McIntosh**	
Alexandra	LCL		**David Brookman**	
Angas	LCL		**Berthold Teusner**	Henry Schneider (Ind)
Burnside	LCL		**Geoffrey Clarke**	
Burra	LCL	Even George	**George Hawker**	
Chaffey	Independent	Robert Lambert	Ross Story	**William MacGillivray** (Ind)
Eyre	LCL		**Arthur Christian**	
Flinders	LCL		**Rex Pearson**	
Frome	Labor	**Mick O'Halloran**		
Gawler	Labor	**Leslie Duncan**	Eldred Riggs	
Glenelg	LCL	John Sexton	**Baden Pattinson**	
Goodwood	Labor	**Frank Walsh**	Herbert Kemp	
Gouger	LCL	Archibald Riddoch	**Rufus Goldney**	
Gumeracha	LCL		**Thomas Playford**	
Hindmarsh	Labor	Cyril Hutchens		
Light	LCL		**Herbert Michael**	
Mitcham	LCL	Charles Smith	**Henry Dunks**	
Mount Gambier	Independent	John Shepherdson		**John Fletcher** (Ind)
Murray	Labor	**Richard McKenzie**	Hector White	
Newcastle	LCL	Leonard Pilton	**George Jenkins**	
Norwood	LCL	Edward Souter	**Roy Moir**	Alfred Watt (Comm)
Onkaparinga	LCL	Frank Staniford	**Howard Shannon**	
Port Adelaide	Labor	**James Stephens**		Peter Symon (Comm)
Port Pirie	Labor	**Charles Davis**		Charles Emery (Ind); Leslie Kyte (Ind)
Prospect	LCL	James Marner	**Elder Whittle**	Alan Finger (Comm)
Ridley	Independent			**Tom Stott** (Ind.)
Rocky River	LCL		**James Heaslip**	
Semaphore	Labor	**Harold Tapping**		Joseph Talbot (Ind.)
Stanley	Labor	Cyril Hasse	Alexander Knappstein	**Percy Quirke** (Ind.)
Stirling	LCL		**Herbert Dunn**	William Jenkins (Ind.)
Stuart	Labor	**Lindsay Riches**		John Sendy (Comm)
Thebarton	Labor	**Fred Walsh**		
Torrens	LCL	Herbert Baldock	**Shirley Jeffries**	
Unley	LCL	Leslie Wright	**Colin Dunnage**	
Victoria	LCL	Jim Corcoran	**Roy McLachlan**	
Wallaroo	Labor	Hughie McAlees	Leslie Heath	Spence Crosby (Ind.)
Yorke Peninsula	LCL		**Cecil Hincks**	
Young	LCL		**Robert Nicholls**	

== Legislative Council ==
Sitting members are shown in bold text. Successful candidates are highlighted in the relevant colour and identified by an asterisk (*).

District	Held by	Labor candidates	LCL candidates
Central No. 1	2 Labor	**Frank Condon***; **Bert Hoare***	
Central No. 2	2 LCL	A L Stuart; A W G Wright	**James Sandford***; **Frank Perry***
Midland	2 LCL		**Walter Duncan***; **Reginald Rudall***
Northern	2 LCL	Ron Loveday; C R Hannan	**Lyell McEwin***; **Harry Edmonds***
Southern	2 LCL		**Les Densley***; **Norman Jude***
