= Results of the 1953 South Australian state election (House of Assembly) =

Australian election result

South Australian state election, 7 March 1953 House of Assembly << 1950–1956 >>
Enrolled voters	354,273				
Votes cast	336,592		Turnout	95.01%	+1.86%
Informal votes	9,871		Informal	2.93%	–0.40%
Summary of votes by party
Party	Primary votes	%	Swing	Seats	Change
Labor	166,517	50.97%	+2.88%	14	+ 2
Liberal and Country	119,106	36.45%	–4.05%	21	– 2
Communist	4,827	1.48%	+0.14%	0	± 0
Independent	36,271	11.10%	+1.03%	4	± 0
Total	326,721			39	
Two-party-preferred
Liberal and Country		47.00%	–4.30%		
Labor		53.00%	+4.30%		

This is a list of House of Assembly results for the 1953 South Australian state election.

== Results by electoral district ==
=== Adelaide ===
1953 South Australian state election: Adelaide
Party	Candidate	Votes	%	±%
Labor	Sam Lawn	9,271	89.5	+51.2
Communist	Edward Robertson	1,093	10.5	+10.5
Total formal votes		10,364	93.1	+0.8
Informal votes		770	6.9	−0.8
Turnout		11,134	92.4	+1.7
Labor hold		Swing	N/A	

=== Albert ===
1953 South Australian state election: Albert
Party	Candidate	Votes	%	±%
Liberal and Country	Malcolm McIntosh	4,225	74.6	−25.4
Independent	Robert Upton	999	17.7	+17.7
Independent	Carl Muller	436	7.7	+7.7
Total formal votes		5,660	96.6	
Informal votes		200	3.4	
Turnout		5,860	95.7	
Liberal and Country hold		Swing	N/A	

- Preferences were not distributed.

=== Alexandra ===
1953 South Australian state election: Alexandra
Party	Candidate	Votes	%	±%
Liberal and Country	David Brookman	unopposed		
Liberal and Country hold		Swing		

=== Angas ===
1953 South Australian state election: Angas
Party	Candidate	Votes	%	±%
Liberal and Country	Berthold Teusner	4,088	68.1	−7.8
Independent	Henry Schneider	1,914	31.9	+7.8
Total formal votes		6,002	97.1	−0.9
Informal votes		176	2.9	+0.9
Turnout		6,178	96.7	+0.4
Liberal and Country hold		Swing	−7.8	

=== Burnside ===
1953 South Australian state election: Burnside
Party	Candidate	Votes	%	±%
Liberal and Country	Geoffrey Clarke	11,791	61.5	−38.5
Labor	Frederick Hansford	5,601	29.2	+29.2
Independent	John Parkinson	1,770	9.2	+9.2
Total formal votes		19,162	97.6	
Informal votes		475	2.4	
Turnout		19,637	94.5	
Two-party-preferred result
Liberal and Country	Geoffrey Clarke		66.1	−33.9
Labor	Frederick Hansford		33.9	+33.9
Liberal and Country hold		Swing	N/A	

=== Burra ===
1953 South Australian state election: Burra
Party	Candidate	Votes	%	±%
Liberal and Country	George Hawker	2,478	59.4	−1.9
Labor	Even George	1,697	40.6	+1.9
Total formal votes		4,175	99.0	0.0
Informal votes		41	1.0	0.0
Turnout		4,216	97.2	+2.5
Liberal and Country hold		Swing	−1.9	

=== Chaffey ===
1953 South Australian state election: Chaffey
Party	Candidate	Votes	%	±%
Independent	William Macgillivray	4,731	69.1	+28.8
Liberal and Country	Ross Story	2,111	30.9	−4.2
Total formal votes		6,842	97.5	+0.2
Informal votes		174	2.5	−0.2
Turnout		7,016	95.3	−0.1
Independent hold		Swing	+8.4	

=== Eyre ===
1953 South Australian state election: Eyre
Party	Candidate	Votes	%	±%
Liberal and Country	Arthur Christian	3,194	67.8	−32.2
Independent	Herbert Hogan	1,519	32.2	+32.2
Total formal votes		4,713	97.9	
Informal votes		102	2.1	
Turnout		4,815	94.7	
Liberal and Country hold		Swing	N/A	

=== Flinders ===
1953 South Australian state election: Flinders
Party	Candidate	Votes	%	±%
Liberal and Country	Glen Pearson	4,129	58.4	−41.6
Labor	Percy Baillie	2,936	41.6	+41.6
Total formal votes		7,065	98.7	
Informal votes		94	1.3	
Turnout		7,159	96.2	
Liberal and Country hold		Swing	N/A	

=== Frome ===
1953 South Australian state election: Frome
Party	Candidate	Votes	%	±%
Labor	Mick O'Halloran	unopposed		
Labor hold		Swing		

=== Gawler ===
1953 South Australian state election: Gawler
Party	Candidate	Votes	%	±%
Labor	John Clark	4,432	77.1	+22.9
Independent	Frank Rieck	1,320	22.9	+22.9
Total formal votes		5,752	96.2	−2.7
Informal votes		230	3.8	+2.7
Turnout		5,982	96.1	+0.7
Labor hold		Swing	N/A	

=== Glenelg ===
1953 South Australian state election: Glenelg
Party	Candidate	Votes	%	±%
Liberal and Country	Baden Pattinson	12,927	50.7	−11.6
Labor	Loftus Fenwick	12,562	49.3	+11.6
Total formal votes		25,489	97.5	+0.2
Informal votes		617	2.5	−0.2
Turnout		26,128	95.6	+1.7
Liberal and Country hold		Swing	−11.6	

=== Goodwood ===
1953 South Australian state election: Goodwood
Party	Candidate	Votes	%	±%
Labor	Frank Walsh	15,057	63.1	+8.6
Liberal and Country	Howard Zelling	8,795	36.9	−8.6
Total formal votes		23,852	97.6	−0.8
Informal votes		577	2.4	+0.8
Turnout		24,429	94.7	+1.8
Labor hold		Swing	+8.6	

=== Gouger ===
1953 South Australian state election: Gouger
Party	Candidate	Votes	%	±%
Liberal and Country	Rufus Goldney	3,560	56.1	−14.4
Labor	Bernard McEwen	2,784	43.9	+14.4
Total formal votes		6,344	98.6	+0.8
Informal votes		89	1.4	−0.8
Turnout		6,433	96.9	
Liberal and Country hold		Swing	−14.4	

=== Gumeracha ===
1953 South Australian state election: Gumeracha
Party	Candidate	Votes	%	±%
Liberal and Country	Thomas Playford	5,315	90.4	−9.6
Communist	Alan Finger	566	9.6	+9.6
Total formal votes		5,881	95.1	
Informal votes		302	4.9	
Turnout		6,183	96.2	
Liberal and Country hold		Swing	N/A	

=== Hindmarsh ===
1953 South Australian state election: Hindmarsh
Party	Candidate	Votes	%	±%
Labor	Cyril Hutchens	unopposed		
Labor hold		Swing		

=== Light ===
1953 South Australian state election: Light
Party	Candidate	Votes	%	±%
Liberal and Country	Herbert Michael	3,079	59.5	−40.5
Labor	Donald MacLeod	2,092	40.5	+40.5
Total formal votes		5,171	98.5	
Informal votes		80	1.5	
Turnout		5,251	96.7	
Liberal and Country hold		Swing	N/A	

=== Mitcham ===
1953 South Australian state election: Mitcham
Party	Candidate	Votes	%	±%
Liberal and Country	Henry Dunks	unopposed		
Liberal and Country hold		Swing		

=== Mount Gambier ===
1953 South Australian state election: Mount Gambier
Party	Candidate	Votes	%	±%
Independent	John Fletcher	4,577	54.3	−10.1
Labor	Raphael Mahony	3,848	45.7	+10.1
Total formal votes		8,425	98.8	+0.4
Informal votes		101	1.2	−0.4
Turnout		8,526	96.0	+2.3
Independent hold		Swing	−10.1	

=== Murray ===
1953 South Australian state election: Murray
Party	Candidate	Votes	%	±%
Liberal and Country	Hector White	3,026	45.1	−4.1
Labor	Robert Moroney	2,220	33.1	−17.7
Independent	Lawrence McKenzie	773	11.5	+11.5
Independent	Albert Denman	685	10.2	+10.2
Total formal votes		6,704	97.2	−1.1
Informal votes		194	2.8	+1.1
Turnout		6,898	96.8	+1.4
Two-party-preferred result
Liberal and Country	Hector White	3,385	50.5	+1.3
Labor	Robert Moroney	3,319	49.5	−1.3
Liberal and Country gain from Labor		Swing	+1.3	

=== Newcastle ===
1953 South Australian state election: Newcastle
Party	Candidate	Votes	%	±%
Liberal and Country	George Jenkins	2,275	63.7	−7.6
Labor	Gerald Travers	1,298	36.3	+7.6
Total formal votes		3,573	97.4	−1.5
Informal votes		96	2.6	+1.5
Turnout		3,669	92.0	+5.9
Liberal and Country hold		Swing	−7.6	

=== Norwood ===
1953 South Australian state election: Norwood
Party	Candidate	Votes	%	±%
Labor	Don Dunstan	9,189	56.3	+12.4
Liberal and Country	Roy Moir	7,122	43.7	−0.2
Total formal votes		16,311	97.8	+2.9
Informal votes		367	2.2	−2.9
Turnout		16,678	95.1	+1.4
Labor gain from Liberal and Country		Swing	+10.8	

=== Onkaparinga ===
1953 South Australian state election: Onkaparinga
Party	Candidate	Votes	%	±%
Liberal and Country	Howard Shannon	4,266	57.0	−4.1
Labor	Frank Staniford	3,223	43.0	+4.1
Total formal votes		7,489	97.9	−0.7
Informal votes		160	2.1	+0.7
Turnout		7,649	95.7	+0.8
Liberal and Country hold		Swing	−4.1	

=== Port Adelaide ===
1953 South Australian state election: Port Adelaide
Party	Candidate	Votes	%	±%
Labor	James Stephens	25,131	91.9	+1.7
Communist	Peter Symon	2,212	8.1	−1.7
Total formal votes		27,343	94.6	0.0
Informal votes		1,559	5.4	0.0
Turnout		28,902	95.1	+2.3
Labor hold		Swing	+1.7	

=== Port Pirie ===
1953 South Australian state election: Port Pirie
Party	Candidate	Votes	%	±%
Labor	Charles Davis	5,137	65.8	−3.7
Independent	Arthur Pickering	1,585	20.3	+20.3
Independent	Thomas Madigan	1,089	13.9	+13.9
Total formal votes		7,811	95.2	+4.3
Informal votes		390	4.8	−4.3
Turnout		8,201	96.2	+1.2
Labor hold		Swing	N/A	

- Preferences were not distributed.

=== Prospect ===
1953 South Australian state election: Prospect
Party	Candidate	Votes	%	±%
Labor	Jack Jennings	11,728	53.4	+12.2
Liberal and Country	Elder Whittle	10,228	46.6	−8.9
Total formal votes		21,956	97.9	+2.4
Informal votes		468	2.1	−2.4
Turnout		22,424	94.9	+0.4
Labor gain from Liberal and Country		Swing	+9.2	

=== Ridley ===
1953 South Australian state election: Ridley
Party	Candidate	Votes	%	±%
Independent	Tom Stott	4,531	77.8	−22.2
Independent	Henry Schneider	1,291	22.2	+22.2
Total formal votes		5,822	98.2	
Informal votes		107	1.8	
Turnout		5,929	97.0	
Independent hold		Swing	N/A	

=== Rocky River ===
1953 South Australian state election: Rocky River
Party	Candidate	Votes	%	±%
Liberal and Country	James Heaslip	unopposed		
Liberal and Country hold		Swing		

=== Semaphore ===
1953 South Australian state election: Semaphore
Party	Candidate	Votes	%	±%
Labor	Harold Tapping	19,043	87.6	+7.1
Independent	Roy Luckman	2,693	12.4	+12.4
Total formal votes		21,736	95.4	+1.2
Informal votes		1,037	4.6	−1.2
Turnout		22,773	93.9	+1.8
Labor hold		Swing	N/A	

=== Stanley ===
1953 South Australian state election: Stanley
Party	Candidate	Votes	%	±%
Independent	Percy Quirke	2,954	61.9	+14.7
Liberal and Country	Elliot Parker	1,817	38.1	+2.6
Total formal votes		4,771	98.0	−0.8
Informal votes		98	2.0	+0.8
Turnout		4,869	96.8	−0.1
Independent hold		Swing	+1.9	

=== Stirling ===
1953 South Australian state election: Stirling
Party	Candidate	Votes	%	±%
Liberal and Country	William Jenkins	3,507	52.9	−3.7
Independent	William McAnaney	2,141	32.3	32.3
Independent	Orlando Hutchinson	985	14.8	+14.8
Total formal votes		6,633	97.6	−0.7
Informal votes		161	2.4	+0.7
Turnout		6,794	97.0	+1.8
Liberal and Country hold		Swing	N/A	

- Preferences were not distributed.

=== Stuart ===
1953 South Australian state election: Stuart
Party	Candidate	Votes	%	±%
Labor	Lindsay Riches	8,444	89.8	−3.0
Communist	Elliott Johnston	956	10.2	+3.0
Total formal votes		9,400	96.3	+0.1
Informal votes		363	3.7	−0.1
Turnout		9,763	90.1	+0.1
Labor hold		Swing	−3.0	

=== Thebarton ===
1953 South Australian state election: Thebarton
Party	Candidate	Votes	%	±%
Labor	Fred Walsh	unopposed		
Labor hold		Swing		

=== Torrens ===
1953 South Australian state election: Torrens
Party	Candidate	Votes	%	±%
Liberal and Country	Leo Travers	8,469	51.3	−3.2
Labor	Thomas Sexton	8,055	48.7	+3.2
Total formal votes		16,524	97.9	−0.3
Informal votes		359	2.1	+0.3
Turnout		16,883	94.1	+1.9
Liberal and Country hold		Swing	−3.2	

=== Unley ===
1953 South Australian state election: Unley
Party	Candidate	Votes	%	±%
Liberal and Country	Colin Dunnage	8,065	50.3	−7.5
Labor	Arthur Savage	7,974	49.7	+7.5
Total formal votes		16,039	97.9	−0.1
Informal votes		336	2.1	+0.1
Turnout		16,375	94.5	+2.2
Labor hold		Swing	−7.5	

=== Victoria ===
1953 South Australian state election: Victoria
Party	Candidate	Votes	%	±%
Labor	Jim Corcoran	4,795	49.4	+2.1
Liberal and Country	Roy McLachlan	4,639	47.8	−4.9
Independent	John Gartner	278	2.9	+2.9
Total formal votes		9,712	98.7	−0.3
Informal votes		126	1.3	+0.3
Turnout		9,838	95.5	+1.1
Two-party-preferred result
Labor	Jim Corcoran		50.8	+3.5
Liberal and Country	Roy McLachlan		49.2	−3.5
Labor gain from Liberal and Country		Swing	+3.5	

=== Wallaroo ===
1953 South Australian state election: Wallaroo
Party	Candidate	Votes	%	±%
Labor	Hughie McAlees	unopposed		
Labor hold		Swing		

=== Yorke Peninsula ===
1953 South Australian state election: Yorke Peninsula
Party	Candidate	Votes	%	±%
Liberal and Country	Cecil Hincks	unopposed		
Liberal and Country hold		Swing		

=== Young ===
1953 South Australian state election: Young
Party	Candidate	Votes	%	±%
Liberal and Country	Robert Nicholls	unopposed		
Liberal and Country hold		Swing		

== See also ==
- Candidates of the 1953 South Australian state election
- Members of the South Australian House of Assembly, 1953–1956
