= Results of the 1956 South Australian state election (House of Assembly) =

South Australian state election, 3 March 1956 House of Assembly << 1953–1959 >>
Enrolled voters	299,048				
Votes cast	280,811		Turnout	93.90%	–1.11%
Informal votes	6,702		Informal	2.39%	–0.54%
Summary of votes by party
Party	Primary votes	%	Swing	Seats	Change
Labor	129,853	47.37%	–3.60%	15	± 0
Liberal and Country	100,569	36.95%	+0.23%	21	+ 1
Labor (A-C)	20,384	7.44%	*	0	± 0
Communist	3,185	1.16%	–0.32%	0	± 0
Independent	20,118	7.34%	–3.76%	3	– 1
Total	274,109			39	
Two-party-preferred
Liberal and Country		51.30%	+4.30%		
Labor		48.70%	–4.30%		

This is a list of House of Assembly results for the 1956 South Australian state election.

== Results by electoral district ==
=== Adelaide ===
1956 South Australian state election: Adelaide
Party	Candidate	Votes	%	±%
Labor	Sam Lawn	15,116	76.8	
Labor (A-C)	James O'Sullivan	3,281	16.7	
Communist	Edward Robertson	1,295	6.6	
Total formal votes		19,692	95.2	
Informal votes		989	4.8	
Turnout		20,681	92.0	
Two-candidate-preferred result
Labor	Sam Lawn		81.7	
Labor (A-C)	James O'Sullivan		18.3	
Labor hold		Swing		

- Two candidate preferred vote was estimated.

=== Albert ===
1956 South Australian state election: Albert
Party	Candidate	Votes	%	±%
Liberal and Country	Malcolm McIntosh	unopposed		
Liberal and Country hold		Swing		

=== Alexandra ===
1956 South Australian state election: Alexandra
Party	Candidate	Votes	%	±%
Liberal and Country	David Brookman	unopposed		
Liberal and Country hold		Swing		

=== Angas ===
1956 South Australian state election: Angas
Party	Candidate	Votes	%	±%
Liberal and Country	Berthold Teusner	4,655	77.6	
Independent	William Viney	1,344	22.4	
Total formal votes		5,999	97.7	
Informal votes		142	2.3	
Turnout		6,141	95.7	
Liberal and Country hold		Swing		

=== Barossa ===
1956 South Australian state election: Barossa
Party	Candidate	Votes	%	±%
Liberal and Country	Condor Laucke	unopposed		
Liberal and Country hold		Swing		

=== Burnside ===
1956 South Australian state election: Burnside
Party	Candidate	Votes	%	±%
Liberal and Country	Geoffrey Clarke	unopposed		
Liberal and Country hold		Swing		

=== Burra ===
1956 South Australian state election: Burra
Party	Candidate	Votes	%	±%
Independent	Percy Quirke	3,015	51.2	
Liberal and Country	George Hawker	2,876	48.8	
Total formal votes		5,891	98.9	
Informal votes		67	1.1	
Turnout		5,958	95.1	
Independent gain from Liberal and Country		Swing		

=== Chaffey ===
1956 South Australian state election: Chaffey
Party	Candidate	Votes	%	±%
Independent	William MacGillivray	2,386	35.9	
Liberal and Country	Harold King	2,249	33.9	
Labor	Robert Curren	1,971	29.7	
Independent	William Napier	36	0.5	
Total formal votes		6,642	97.4	
Informal votes		174	2.6	
Turnout		6,816	95.7	
Two-candidate-preferred result
Liberal and Country	Harold King	3,669	55.2	
Independent	William MacGillivray	2,973	44.8	
Liberal and Country gain from Independent		Swing		

=== Edwardstown ===
1956 South Australian state election: Edwardstown
Party	Candidate	Votes	%	±%
Labor	Frank Walsh	15,366	74.3	
Labor (A-C)	Patrick Tippins	5,317	25.7	
Total formal votes		20,683	96.0	
Informal votes		858	4.0	
Turnout		21,541	93.6	
Labor hold		Swing		

=== Enfield ===
1956 South Australian state election: Enfield
Party	Candidate	Votes	%	±%
Labor	Jack Jennings	14,091	67.2	
Liberal and Country	Betty Preston	5,865	28.0	
Labor (A-C)	Charles Matthews	1,005	4.8	
Total formal votes		20,961	98.2	
Informal votes		383	1.8	
Turnout		21,344	93.9	
Two-party-preferred result
Labor	Jack Jennings		67.9	
Liberal and Country	Betty Preston		32.1	
Labor hold		Swing		

- Two party preferred vote was estimated.

=== Eyre ===
1956 South Australian state election: Eyre
Party	Candidate	Votes	%	±%
Liberal and Country	George Bockelberg	3,498	55.9	
Independent	Herbert Hogan	1,793	28.6	
Independent	George Simpson	970	15.5	
Total formal votes		6,261	98.4	
Informal votes		100	1.6	
Turnout		9,361	93.4	
Liberal and Country hold		Swing		

- Preferences were not distributed.

=== Flinders ===
1956 South Australian state election: Flinders
Party	Candidate	Votes	%	±%
Liberal and Country	Glen Pearson	unopposed		
Liberal and Country hold		Swing		

=== Frome ===
1956 South Australian state election: Frome
Party	Candidate	Votes	%	±%
Labor	Mick O'Halloran	2,844	52.6	
Liberal and Country	Raymond McAuley	1,954	36.2	
Labor (A-C)	Michael Hoare	606	11.2	
Total formal votes		5,404	98.6	
Informal votes		76	1.4	
Turnout		5,480	89.0	
Two-party-preferred result
Labor	Mick O'Halloran		54.3	
Liberal and Country	Raymond McAuley		45.7	
Labor hold		Swing		

- Two party preferred vote was estimated.

=== Gawler ===
1956 South Australian state election: Gawler
Party	Candidate	Votes	%	±%
Labor	John Clark	unopposed		
Labor hold		Swing		

=== Glenelg ===
1956 South Australian state election: Glenelg
Party	Candidate	Votes	%	±%
Liberal and Country	Baden Pattinson	11,650	53.6	
Labor	Loftus Fenwick	8,959	41.3	
Labor (A-C)	Peter Lasarewitch	1,100	5.1	
Total formal votes		21,719	98.5	
Informal votes		325	1.5	
Turnout		22,044	94.4	
Two-party-preferred result
Liberal and Country	Baden Pattinson		58.0	
Labor	Loftus Fenwick		42.0	
Liberal and Country hold		Swing		

- Two party preferred vote was estimated.

=== Gouger ===
1956 South Australian state election: Gouger
Party	Candidate	Votes	%	±%
Liberal and Country	Rufus Goldney	4,330	70.5	
Independent	Hector Henstridge	1,813	29.5	
Total formal votes		6,143	96.8	
Informal votes		205	3.2	
Turnout		6,348	95.2	
Liberal and Country hold		Swing		

=== Gumeracha ===
1956 South Australian state election: Gumeracha
Party	Candidate	Votes	%	±%
Liberal and Country	Thomas Playford	5,457	88.6	
Communist	Fred Slater	705	11.4	
Total formal votes		6,162	96.1	
Informal votes		251	3.9	
Turnout		6,413	94.8	
Liberal and Country hold		Swing		

=== Hindmarsh ===
1956 South Australian state election: Hindmarsh
Party	Candidate	Votes	%	±%
Labor	Cyril Hutchens	unopposed		
Labor hold		Swing		

=== Light ===
1956 South Australian state election: Light
Party	Candidate	Votes	%	±%
Liberal and Country	George Hambour	unopposed		
Liberal and Country hold		Swing		

=== Millicent ===
1956 South Australian state election: Millicent
Party	Candidate	Votes	%	±%
Labor	Jim Corcoran	3,201	52.3	
Liberal and Country	William Gordon	2,918	47.7	
Total formal votes		6,119	99.3	
Informal votes		42	0.7	
Turnout		6,161	95.3	
Labor hold		Swing		

=== Mitcham ===
1956 South Australian state election: Mitcham
Party	Candidate	Votes	%	±%
Liberal and Country	Robin Millhouse	unopposed		
Liberal and Country hold		Swing		

=== Mount Gambier ===
1956 South Australian state election: Mount Gambier
Party	Candidate	Votes	%	±%
Independent	John Fletcher	3,822	56.1	
Labor	Ron Ralston	2,988	43.9	
Total formal votes		6,810	98.5	
Informal votes		103	1.5	
Turnout		6,913	95.1	
Independent hold		Swing		

=== Murray ===
1956 South Australian state election: Murray
Party	Candidate	Votes	%	±%
Labor	Gabe Bywaters	3,533	51.4	
Liberal and Country	Hector White	3,340	48.6	
Total formal votes		6,873	98.5	
Informal votes		104	1.5	
Turnout		6,977	96.1	
Labor gain from Liberal and Country		Swing		

=== Norwood ===
1956 South Australian state election: Norwood
Party	Candidate	Votes	%	±%
Labor	Don Dunstan	11,981	56.5	
Liberal and Country	Roy Moir	8,323	39.3	
Labor (A-C)	John Parkinson	884	4.2	
Total formal votes		21,188	98.4	
Informal votes		354	1.6	
Turnout		21,532	93.8	
Two-party-preferred result
Labor	Don Dunstan		57.2	
Liberal and Country	Roy Moir		42.8	
Labor hold		Swing		

=== Onkaparinga ===
1956 South Australian state election: Onkaparinga
Party	Candidate	Votes	%	±%
Liberal and Country	Howard Shannon	4,189	70.1	
Independent	Frank Rieck	1,786	29.9	
Total formal votes		5,975	95.7	
Informal votes		269	4.3	
Turnout		6,244	94.1	
Liberal and Country hold		Swing		

=== Port Adelaide ===
1956 South Australian state election: Port Adelaide
Party	Candidate	Votes	%	±%
Labor	James Stephens	16,321	77.8	
Labor (A-C)	Brian Crowe	3,461	16.5	
Communist	Alan Finger	1,185	5.7	
Total formal votes		20,967	95.8	
Informal votes		916	4.2	
Turnout		21,883	93.7	
Two-candidate-preferred result
Labor	James Stephens		82.1	
Labor (A-C)	Brian Crowe		17.9	
Labor hold		Swing		

- Two candidate preferred vote was estimated.

=== Port Pirie ===
1956 South Australian state election: Port Pirie
Party	Candidate	Votes	%	±%
Labor	Charles Davis	unopposed		
Labor hold		Swing		

=== Ridley ===
1956 South Australian state election: Ridley
Party	Candidate	Votes	%	±%
Independent	Tom Stott	2,638	42.7	
Liberal and Country	Cyril Tunbridge	2,054	33.2	
Labor	Arnold Busbridge	1,487	24.1	
Total formal votes		6,179	99.0	
Informal votes		65	1.0	
Turnout		6,244	96.6	
Two-candidate-preferred result
Independent	Tom Stott	3,771	61.0	
Liberal and Country	Cyril Tunbridge	2,408	39.0	
Independent hold		Swing		

=== Rocky River ===
1956 South Australian state election: Rocky River
Party	Candidate	Votes	%	±%
Liberal and Country	James Heaslip	unopposed		
Liberal and Country hold		Swing		

=== Semaphore ===
1956 South Australian state election: Semaphore
Party	Candidate	Votes	%	±%
Labor	Harold Tapping	unopposed		
Labor hold		Swing		

=== Stirling ===
1956 South Australian state election: Stirling
Party	Candidate	Votes	%	±%
Liberal and Country	William Jenkins	unopposed		
Liberal and Country hold		Swing		

=== Stuart ===
1956 South Australian state election: Stuart
Party	Candidate	Votes	%	±%
Labor	Lindsay Riches	unopposed		
Labor hold		Swing		

=== Torrens ===
1956 South Australian state election: Torrens
Party	Candidate	Votes	%	±%
Liberal and Country	John Coumbe	10,601	51.3	
Labor	George Seager	8,382	40.6	
Labor (A-C)	Olaf Alland	1,674	8.1	
Total formal votes		20,657	98.4	
Informal votes		336	1.6	
Turnout		20,993	93.6	
Two-party-preferred result
Liberal and Country	John Coumbe		58.2	
Labor	George Seager		41.8	
Liberal and Country hold		Swing		

- Two party preferred vote was estimated.

=== Unley ===
1956 South Australian state election: Unley
Party	Candidate	Votes	%	±%
Liberal and Country	Colin Dunnage	10,900	53.6	
Labor	Cyril Hasse	7,868	38.7	
Labor (A-C)	Francis Ryan	1,566	7.7	
Total formal votes		20,334	98.1	
Informal votes		386	1.9	
Turnout		20,720	93.6	
Two-party-preferred result
Liberal and Country	Colin Dunnage		60.2	
Labor	Cyril Hasse		39.8	
Liberal and Country hold		Swing		

- Two party preferred vote was estimated.

=== Victoria ===
1956 South Australian state election: Victoria
Party	Candidate	Votes	%	±%
Liberal and Country	Leslie Harding	3,841	61.7	
Labor	Victor Sparrow	2,385	38.3	
Total formal votes		6,226	98.6	
Informal votes		90	1.4	
Turnout		9,316	94.1	
Liberal and Country hold		Swing		

=== Wallaroo ===
1956 South Australian state election: Wallaroo
Party	Candidate	Votes	%	±%
Liberal and Country	Leslie Heath	2,971	47.2	
Labor	Robert Butler	2,808	44.6	
Independent	Arthur Clarke	515	8.2	
Total formal votes		6,294	99.0	
Informal votes		62	1.0	
Turnout		6,356	96.3	
Two-party-preferred result
Liberal and Country	Leslie Heath	3,271	52.0	
Labor	Robert Butler	3,023	48.0	
Liberal and Country gain from Labor		Swing		

=== West Torrens ===
1956 South Australian state election: West Torrens
Party	Candidate	Votes	%	±%
Labor	Fred Walsh	10,542	50.4	
Liberal and Country	Frank Potter	8,898	42.5	
Labor (A-C)	Patrick McEwen	1,490	7.1	
Total formal votes		20,930	98.1	
Informal votes		405	1.9	
Turnout		21,335	93.1	
Two-party-preferred result
Labor	Fred Walsh		51.4	
Liberal and Country	Frank Potter		48.6	
Labor hold		Swing		

- Two party preferred vote was estimated.

=== Whyalla ===
1956 South Australian state election: Whyalla
Party	Candidate	Votes	%	±%
Labor	Ron Loveday	unopposed		
Labor hold		Swing		

=== Yorke Peninsula ===
1956 South Australian state election: Yorke Peninsula
Party	Candidate	Votes	%	±%
Liberal and Country	Cecil Hincks	unopposed		
Liberal and Country hold		Swing		

== See also ==
- Candidates of the 1956 South Australian state election
- Members of the South Australian House of Assembly, 1956–1959
