= Candidates of the 1959 South Australian state election =

The 1959 South Australian state election was held on 7 March 1959.

== Retiring Members ==
=== Labor ===
- James Stephens, MHA (Port Adelaide)

=== Liberal and Country ===
- Malcolm McIntosh, MHA (Albert)
- Geoffrey Clarke, MHA (Burnside)
- Rufus Goldney, MHA (Gouger)
- Ernest Anthoney, MLC (Central No.2 District)
- Collier Cudmore, MLC (Central No.2 District)
- Jack Bice, MLC (Southern District)
- John Cowan, MLC (Southern District)

== House of Assembly ==
Sitting members are shown in bold text. Successful candidates are highlighted in the relevant colour. Where there is possible confusion, an asterisk (*) is also used.

Electorate	Held by	Labor candidate	LCL candidate	DLP candidate	Other candidates
Adelaide	Labor	**Sam Lawn**		James O'Sullivan	Elliott Johnston (Comm)
Albert	LCL		Bill Nankivell		
Alexandra	LCL		**David Brookman**		
Angas	LCL	Harley Ladd	**Berthold Teusner**		
Barossa	LCL		**Condor Laucke**		
Burnside	LCL		Joyce Steele	Kenneth Constable	John Parkinson (Ind.); Keith Gibbs (Ind.); Frank Rieck (Ind.)
Burra	Independent		Gordon Gilfillan		**Percy Quirke** (Ind.)
Chaffey	LCL	Robert Curren	**Harold King**		William MacGillivray (Ind.)
Edwardstown	Labor	**Frank Walsh**	May Mills	Daniel Faulkner	
Enfield	Labor	**Jack Jennings**		Edward Timlin	Thomas Ellis (Ind.); Alan Miller (Comm)
Eyre	LCL		**George Bockelberg**		
Flinders	LCL	Percy Baillie	**Glen Pearson**		
Frome	Labor	**Mick O'Halloran**	Maxwell Hams	Michael Hoare	
Gawler	Labor	**John Clark**	Jean Davis		
Glenelg	LCL	Richard Clifford	**Baden Pattinson**	Nathaniel Bishop	
Gouger	LCL		Steele Hall		Thomas Freebairn (Ind.); Hector Henstridge (Ind.)
Gumeracha	LCL	Ernie Crimes	**Thomas Playford**		Charles Coffey (Ind.)
Hindmarsh	Labor	**Cyril Hutchens**			
Light	LCL	Donald MacLeod	**George Hambour**		
Millicent	Labor	**Jim Corcoran**	William Gordon		
Mitcham	LCL	Sylvester Byrne	**Robin Millhouse**	Patrick McCabe	
Mount Gambier	Labor	**Ron Ralston**	Herbert Ashby		
Murray	Labor	**Gabe Bywaters**	Arnold Royal	Susan Critchley	
Norwood	Labor	**Don Dunstan**	Trevor Butcher	Lance Bishop	
Onkaparinga	LCL	Cyril Hasse	**Howard Shannon**		
Port Adelaide	Labor	John Ryan		Gerald Shinnick	James Moss (Comm)
Port Pirie	Labor	Dave McKee			Henry Welch (Ind.); Charles McCaffrey (Comm)
Ridley	Independent	Arnold Busbridge	Roy Glatz		**Tom Stott** (Ind.)
Rocky River	LCL		**James Heaslip**		
Semaphore	Labor	**Harold Tapping**			James Mitchell (Comm)
Stirling	LCL		**William Jenkins**		
Stuart	Labor	**Lindsay Riches**			James Yates (Ind.)
Torrens	LCL	Doreen Pattison	**John Coumbe**	Francis Corcoran	
Unley	LCL	Arthur Savage	**Colin Dunnage**	William Dempsey	
Victoria	LCL	David Walker	**Leslie Harding**	John Gartner	
Wallaroo	Labor	**Lloyd Hughes**	Clifford Dunstone		
West Torrens	Labor	**Fred Walsh**	Ross Stanford	Richard Mills	
Whyalla	Labor	**Ron Loveday**			Allan Mossop (Ind.)
Yorke Peninsula	LCL		**Cecil Hincks**		

== Legislative Council ==
Sitting members are shown in bold text. Successful candidates are highlighted in the relevant colour and identified by an asterisk (*).

District	Held by	Labor candidates	LCL candidates	Other candidates
Central No. 1	2 Labor	**Ken Bardolph***; **Stan Bevan***		
Central No. 2	2 LCL	Margaret Scott; Reg Bishop; Molech Briton	Jessie Cooper*; Frank Potter*; N S Young	Peter Lasarewitch (DLP)
Midland	2 LCL		**Alexander Melrose***; **Colin Rowe***	
Northern	2 LCL	A Hearne; Reg Curren	**Robert Wilson***; **William Robinson***	D Smith (DLP); Thomas Keain (DLP)
Southern	2 LCL		Geoffrey Giles*; Allan Hookings*	
