= Members of the South Australian House of Assembly, 1953–1956 =

This is a list of members of the South Australian House of Assembly from 1953 to 1956, as elected at the 1953 state election:

Name	Party	Electorate	Term of office
David Brookman	LCL	Alexandra	1948–1973
Arthur Christian ^{[2]}	LCL	Eyre	1933–1956
John Clark	Labor	Gawler	1952–1973
Geoffrey Clarke	LCL	Burnside	1946–1959
Jim Corcoran	Labor	Victoria	1945–1947, 1953–1962
Charles Davis	Labor	Port Pirie	1946–1959
Henry Dunks ^{[1]}	LCL	Mitcham	1933–1955
Colin Dunnage	LCL	Unley	1941–1962
Don Dunstan	Labor	Norwood	1953–1979
John Fletcher	Independent	Mount Gambier	1938–1958
Rufus Goldney	LCL	Gouger	1944–1959
George Hawker	LCL	Burra	1947–1956
James Heaslip	LCL	Rocky River	1949–1968
Hon Cecil Hincks	LCL	Yorke Peninsula	1941–1963
Cyril Hutchens	Labor	Hindmarsh	1950–1970
Hon Sir George Jenkins	LCL	Newcastle	1918–1924, 1927–1930, 1933–1956
William Jenkins	LCL	Stirling	1952–1963
Jack Jennings	Labor	Prospect	1953–1977
Sam Lawn	Labor	Adelaide	1950–1971
William Macgillivray	Independent	Chaffey	1938–1956
Hughie McAlees	Labor	Wallaroo	1950–1956
Hon Malcolm McIntosh	LCL	Albert	1921–1959
Herbert Michael	LCL	Light	1939–1941, 1944–1956
Robin Millhouse ^{[1]}	LCL	Mitcham	1955–1982
Hon Sir Robert Nicholls	LCL	Young	1915–1956
Mick O'Halloran	Labor	Frome	1918–1921, 1924–1927, 1938–1960
Baden Pattinson	LCL	Glenelg	1930–1938, 1947–1965
Glen Pearson	LCL	Flinders	1951–1970
Hon Thomas Playford	LCL	Gumeracha	1933–1968
Percy Quirke	Independent	Stanley	1941–1968
Lindsay Riches	Labor	Stuart	1933–1970
Howard Shannon	LCL	Onkaparinga	1933–1968
James Stephens	Labor	Port Adelaide	1933–1959
Tom Stott	Independent	Ridley	1933–1970
Harold Tapping	Labor	Semaphore	1946–1964
Berthold Teusner	LCL	Angas	1944–1970
John Travers	LCL	Torrens	1953–1956
Frank Walsh	Labor	Goodwood	1941–1968
Fred Walsh	Labor	Thebarton	1942–1965
Hector White	LCL	Murray	1953–1956

^{1} The LCL member for Mitcham, Henry Dunks, died on 22 March 1955. LCL candidate Robin Millhouse won the resulting by-election on 7 May.
^{2} The LCL member for Eyre, Arthur Christian, died on 8 January 1956. No by-election was held due to the imminent 1956 state election.
