= 1953 South Australian state election =

- 7 March 1953

All 39 seats in the South Australian House of Assembly 20 seats were needed for a majority
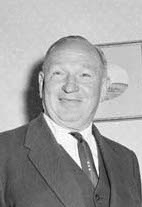

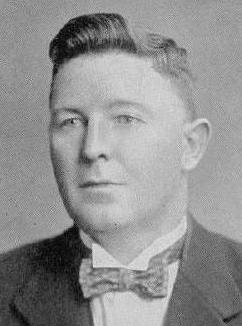
	First party	Second party
Leader	Thomas Playford	Mick O'Halloran
Party	Liberal and Country League	Labor
Leader since	5 November 1938	10 October 1949
Leader's seat	Gumeracha	Frome
Last election	23 seats	12 seats
Seats won	21 seats	14 seats
Seat change	▼2	▲2
Percentage	47.0%	53.0%
Swing	▼4.3	▲4.3
Premier before election
Thomas Playford
Liberal and Country League
Elected Premier
Thomas Playford
Liberal and Country League

State elections were held in South Australia on 7 March 1953. All 39 seats in the South Australian House of Assembly were up for election. The incumbent Liberal and Country League led by Premier of South Australia Thomas Playford IV defeated the Australian Labor Party led by Leader of the Opposition Mick O'Halloran.

== Background ==
Labor won three seats, metropolitan Norwood and Prospect and rural Victoria from the LCL. The LCL won one seat, rural Murray from Labor. Neither major party contested the independent-held seat of Ridley.

The Labor opposition won 53 percent of the statewide two-party vote, but the LCL retained government with the assistance of the Playmander − an electoral malapportionment that also saw a clear majority of the statewide two-party vote won by Labor while failing to form government in 1944, 1962 and 1968.

== Results ==
Arrangement of the House of Assembly after the 1953 state election.

South Australian state election, 7 March 1953 House of Assembly << 1950–1956 >>
Enrolled voters	354,273				
Votes cast	336,592		Turnout	95.01%	+1.86%
Informal votes	9,871		Informal	2.93%	–0.40%
Summary of votes by party
Party	Primary votes	%	Swing	Seats	Change
Labor	166,517	50.97%	+2.88%	14	+ 2
Liberal and Country	119,106	36.45%	–4.05%	21	– 2
Communist	4,827	1.48%	+0.14%	0	± 0
Independent	36,271	11.10%	+1.03%	4	± 0
Total	326,721			39	
Two-party-preferred
Liberal and Country		47.00%	–4.30%		
Labor		53.00%	+4.30%		

- The primary vote figures were from contested seats, while the state-wide two-party-preferred vote figures were estimated from all seats.

== Post-election pendulum ==
LCL seats (21)
Marginal
Unley	Colin Dunnage	LCL	0.3%
Murray	Hector White	LCL	0.5%
Glenelg	Baden Pattinson	LCL	0.7%
Torrens	John Travers	LCL	1.3%
Fairly safe
Gouger	Rufus Goldney	LCL	6.1%
Onkaparinga	Howard Shannon	LCL	7.0%
Flinders	Glen Pearson	LCL	8.4%
Burra	George Hawker	LCL	9.4%
Light	Herbert Michael	LCL	9.5%
Safe
Newcastle	George Jenkins	LCL	13.7%
Burnside	Geoffrey Clarke	LCL	16.1%
Eyre	Arthur Christian	LCL	17.8% v IND
Angas	Berthold Teusner	LCL	18.1% v IND
Gumeracha	Thomas Playford	LCL	40.4% v COM
Albert	Malcolm McIntosh	LCL	undistributed
Stirling	William Jenkins	LCL	undistributed
Alexandra	David Brookman	LCL	unopposed
Mitcham	Henry Dunks	LCL	unopposed
Rocky River	James Heaslip	LCL	unopposed
Yorke Peninsula	Cecil Hincks	LCL	unopposed
Young	Robert Nicholls	LCL	unopposed

Labor seats (15)
Marginal
Victoria	Jim Corcoran	ALP	0.8%
Prospect	Joe Jennings	ALP	3.4%
Fairly safe
Norwood	Don Dunstan	ALP	6.3%
Safe
Stanley	Percy Quirke	ALP	11.9%
Goodwood	Frank Walsh	ALP	13.1%
Gawler	John Clark	ALP	27.1% v IND
Semaphore	Harold Tapping	ALP	37.6% v IND
Adelaide	Sam Lawn	ALP	39.5% v COM
Stuart	Lindsay Riches	ALP	39.8% v COM
Port Adelaide	James Stephens	ALP	41.9% v COM
Port Pirie	Charles Davis	ALP	undistributed
Frome	Mick O'Halloran	ALP	unopposed
Hindmarsh	Cyril Hutchens	ALP	unopposed
Thebarton	Fred Walsh	ALP	unopposed
Wallaroo	Hughie McAlees	ALP	unopposed
Crossbench seats (3)
Mount Gambier	John Fletcher	IND	4.3% v ALP
Chaffey	William MacGillivray	IND	19.1% v LCL
Ridley	Tom Stott	IND	27.8% v IND

== See also ==
- Results of the South Australian state election, 1953 (House of Assembly)
- Candidates of the 1953 South Australian state election
- Members of the South Australian House of Assembly, 1953-1956
- Members of the South Australian Legislative Council, 1953-1956
- Playmander
