= Members of the South Australian House of Assembly, 1950–1953 =

This is a list of members of the South Australian House of Assembly from 1950 to 1953, as elected at the 1950 state election:

Name	Party	Electorate	Term of office
David Brookman	LCL	Alexandra	1948–1973
Arthur Christian	LCL	Eyre	1933–1956
John Clark ^{[2]}	Labor	Gawler	1952–1973
Geoffrey Clarke	LCL	Burnside	1946–1959
Charles Davis	Labor	Port Pirie	1946–1959
Leslie Duncan ^{[2]}	Labor	Gawler	1938–1952
Henry Dunks	LCL	Mitcham	1933–1955
Herbert Dunn ^{[3]}	LCL	Stirling	1938–1952
Colin Dunnage	LCL	Unley	1941–1962
John Fletcher	Independent	Mount Gambier	1938–1958
Rufus Goldney	LCL	Gouger	1944–1959
George Hawker	LCL	Burra	1947–1956
James Heaslip	LCL	Rocky River	1949–1968
Hon Cecil Hincks	LCL	Yorke Peninsula	1941–1963
Cyril Hutchens	Labor	Hindmarsh	1950–1970
Hon Shirley Jeffries	LCL	Torrens	1927–1930, 1933–1944, 1947–1953
Hon Sir George Jenkins	LCL	Newcastle	1918–1924, 1927–1930, 1933–1956
William Jenkins ^{[3]}	LCL	Stirling	1952–1963
Sam Lawn	Labor	Adelaide	1950–1971
William Macgillivray	Independent	Chaffey	1938–1956
Hughie McAlees	Labor	Wallaroo	1950–1956
Hon Malcolm McIntosh	LCL	Albert	1921–1959
Richard McKenzie	Labor	Murray	1938–1953
Roy McLachlan	LCL	Victoria	1947–1953
Herbert Michael	LCL	Light	1939–1941, 1944–1956
Roy Moir	LCL	Norwood	1941–1944, 1947–1953
Hon Sir Robert Nicholls	LCL	Young	1915–1956
Mick O'Halloran	Labor	Frome	1918–1921, 1924–1927, 1938–1960
Baden Pattinson	LCL	Glenelg	1930–1938, 1947–1965
Glen Pearson ^{[1]}	LCL	Flinders	1951–1970
Rex Pearson ^{[1]}	LCL	Flinders	1941–1951
Hon Thomas Playford	LCL	Gumeracha	1933–1968
Percy Quirke	Independent	Stanley	1941–1968
Lindsay Riches	Labor	Stuart	1933–1970
Howard Shannon	LCL	Onkaparinga	1933–1968
James Stephens	Labor	Port Adelaide	1933–1959
Tom Stott	Independent	Ridley	1933–1970
Harold Tapping	Labor	Semaphore	1946–1964
Berthold Teusner	LCL	Angas	1944–1970
Frank Walsh	Labor	Goodwood	1941–1968
Fred Walsh	Labor	Thebarton	1942–1965
Elder Whittle	LCL	Prospect	1938–1944, 1947–1953

^{1} The LCL member for Flinders, Rex Pearson, resigned on 22 March 1951 to run for the Australian Senate at the 1951 federal election. His son, Glen Pearson, won the resulting by-election for the LCL on 2 June 1951.
^{2} The Labor member for Gawler, Leslie Duncan, died on 27 February 1952. Labor candidate John Clark won the resulting by-election on 19 April 1952.
^{3} The LCL member for Stirling, Herbert Dunn, died on 11 September 1952. LCL candidate William Jenkins won the resulting by-election on 18 October 1952.
