= Members of the South Australian House of Assembly, 1944–1947 =

This is a list of members of the South Australian House of Assembly from 1944 to 1947, as elected at the 1944 state election:

Name	Party	Electorate	Term of office
Charles Abbott ^{[3]}	LCL	Burnside	1933–1946
Herbert Baldock	Labor	Torrens	1944–1947
Arthur Christian	LCL	Eyre	1933–1956
Geoffrey Clarke ^{[3]}	LCL	Burnside	1946–1959
Jim Corcoran ^{[2]}	Labor	Victoria	1945–1947, 1953–1962
Bob Dale	Labor	Adelaide	1930–1938, 1944–1947
Charles Davis ^{[5]}	Labor	Port Pirie	1946–1959
Leslie Duncan	Labor	Gawler	1938–1952
Henry Dunks	LCL	Mitcham	1933–1955
Herbert Dunn	LCL	Stirling	1938–1952
Colin Dunnage	LCL	Unley	1941–1962
John Fletcher	Independent	Mount Gambier	1938–1958
Rufus Goldney	LCL	Gouger	1944–1959
Cecil Hincks	LCL	Yorke Peninsula	1941–1963
Hon Sir Herbert Hudd	LCL	Alexandra	1912–1915, 1920–1938, 1941–1948
Hon George Jenkins	LCL	Newcastle	1918–1924, 1927–1930, 1933–1956
Andrew Lacey ^{[5]}	Labor	Port Pirie	1933–1946
John Lyons	LCL	Rocky River	1926–1948
William Macgillivray	Independent	Chaffey	1938–1956
Archibald McDonald	LCL	Burra	1933–1947
Hon John McInnes	Labor	Hindmarsh	1918–1950
Hon Malcolm McIntosh	LCL	Albert	1921–1959
Richard McKenzie	Labor	Murray	1938–1953
Herbert Michael	LCL	Light	1939–1941, 1944–1956
Hon Sir Robert Nicholls	LCL	Young	1915–1956
Frank Nieass	Labor	Norwood	1930–1933, 1938–1941, 1944–1947
Mick O'Halloran	Labor	Frome	1918–1921, 1924–1927, 1938–1960
Rex Pearson	LCL	Flinders	1941–1951
Vernon Petherick ^{[2]}	LCL	Victoria	1918–1924, 1932–1938, 1941–1945
Hon Thomas Playford	LCL	Gumeracha	1933–1968
Percy Quirke	Labor	Stanley	1941–1968
Hon Robert Richards	Labor	Wallaroo	1918–1949
Lindsay Riches	Labor	Stuart	1933–1970
Howard Shannon	LCL	Onkaparinga	1933–1968
Bert Shard	Labor	Prospect	1944–1947
Frank Smith	LCL	Glenelg	1941–1947
James Stephens	Labor	Port Adelaide	1933–1959
Tom Stott	Independent	Ridley	1933–1970
Harold Tapping ^{[4]}	Labor	Semaphore	1946–1964
Berthold Teusner ^{[1]}	LCL	Angas	1944–1970
Albert Thompson ^{[4]}	Labor	Semaphore	1930–1946
Frank Walsh	Labor	Goodwood	1941–1968
Fred Walsh	Labor	Thebarton	1942–1965

^{1} The election for the seat of Angas was postponed due to the death of a candidate. LCL candidate Berthold Teusner won the supplementary election on 10 June 1944.
^{2} Victoria LCL MHA Vernon Petherick died on 14 August 1945. Labor candidate Jim Corcoran won the resulting by-election on 29 September.
^{3} Burnside LCL MHA Charles Abbott resigned on 2 May 1946. LCL candidate Geoffrey Clarke won the resulting by-election on 22 June.
^{4} Semaphore Labor MHA Albert Thompson resigned on 19 August 1946 in order to contest the federal seat of Hindmarsh at the 1946 federal election. Labor candidate Harold Tapping won the resulting by-election on 5 October.
^{5} Port Pirie Labor MLA Andrew Lacey died on 24 August 1946. Labor candidate Charles Davis won the resulting by-election on 19 October.
