= Members of the South Australian House of Assembly, 1947–1950 =

This is a list of members of the South Australian House of Assembly from 1947 to 1950, as elected at the 1947 state election:

| Name | Party | Electorate | Term of office |
|---|---|---|---|
| David Brookman ^{[1]} | LCL | Alexandra | 1948–1973 |
| Arthur Christian | LCL | Eyre | 1933–1956 |
| Geoffrey Clarke | LCL | Burnside | 1946–1959 |
| Charles Davis | Labor | Port Pirie | 1946–1959 |
| Leslie Duncan | Labor | Gawler | 1938–1952 |
| Henry Dunks | LCL | Mitcham | 1933–1955 |
| Herbert Dunn | LCL | Stirling | 1938–1952 |
| Colin Dunnage | LCL | Unley | 1941–1962 |
| John Fletcher | Independent | Mount Gambier | 1938–1958 |
| Herbert George | Labor | Adelaide | 1926–1933, 1947–1950 |
| Rufus Goldney | LCL | Gouger | 1944–1959 |
| George Hawker | LCL | Burra | 1947–1956 |
| James Heaslip ^{[2]} | LCL | Rocky River | 1949–1968 |
| Hon Cecil Hincks | LCL | Yorke Peninsula | 1941–1963 |
| Hon Sir Herbert Hudd ^{[1]} | LCL | Alexandra | 1912–1915, 1920–1938, 1941–1948 |
| Hon Shirley Jeffries | LCL | Torrens | 1927–1930, 1933–1944, 1947–1953 |
| Hon Sir George Jenkins | LCL | Newcastle | 1918–1924, 1927–1930, 1933–1956 |
| John Lyons ^{[2]} | LCL | Rocky River | 1926–1948 |
| William Macgillivray | Independent | Chaffey | 1938–1956 |
| Hon John McInnes | Labor | Hindmarsh | 1918–1950 |
| Hon Malcolm McIntosh | LCL | Albert | 1921–1959 |
| Richard McKenzie | Labor | Murray | 1938–1953 |
| Roy McLachlan | LCL | Victoria | 1947–1953 |
| Herbert Michael | LCL | Light | 1939–1941, 1944–1956 |
| Roy Moir | LCL | Norwood | 1941–1944, 1947–1953 |
| Hon Sir Robert Nicholls | LCL | Young | 1915–1956 |
| Mick O'Halloran | Labor | Frome | 1918–1921, 1924–1927, 1938–1960 |
| Baden Pattinson | LCL | Glenelg | 1930–1938, 1947–1965 |
| Rex Pearson | LCL | Flinders | 1941–1951 |
| Hon Thomas Playford | LCL | Gumeracha | 1933–1968 |
| Percy Quirke | Labor/Independent ^{[4]} | Stanley | 1941–1968 |
| Hon Robert Richards ^{[3]} | Labor | Wallaroo | 1918–1949 |
| Lindsay Riches | Labor | Stuart | 1933–1970 |
| Howard Shannon | LCL | Onkaparinga | 1933–1968 |
| James Stephens | Labor | Port Adelaide | 1933–1959 |
| Tom Stott | Independent | Ridley | 1933–1970 |
| Harold Tapping | Labor | Semaphore | 1946–1964 |
| Berthold Teusner | LCL | Angas | 1944–1970 |
| Frank Walsh | Labor | Goodwood | 1941–1968 |
| Fred Walsh | Labor | Thebarton | 1942–1965 |
| Elder Whittle | LCL | Prospect | 1938–1944, 1947–1953 |

^{1} Alexandra LCL MHA Sir Herbert Hudd died on 30 April 1948. LCL candidate David Brookman won the resulting by-election on 19 June.
^{2} Rocky River LCL MHA John Lyons died on 19 December 1948. LCL candidate James Heaslip won the resulting by-election on 26 February.
^{3} Wallaroo Labor MHA Robert Richards resigned on 22 November 1949 to take up a position as the Commonwealth's Administrator of Nauru. No by-election was held due to the imminent 1950 state election.
^{4} Stanley MHA Percy Quirke was elected as a representative of the Labor Party, but resigned from the party in August 1948 and sat as an independent.
