= Candidates of the 1962 South Australian state election =

The 1962 South Australian state election was held on 3 March 1962.

== Retiring Members ==
=== Labor ===
- Jim Corcoran, MHA (Millicent)

=== Liberal and Country ===
- Leslie Nicholson, MHA (Light)
- Walter Duncan, MLC (Midland District)
- Harry Edmonds, MLC (Northern District)

== House of Assembly ==
Sitting members are shown in bold text. Successful candidates are highlighted in the relevant colour. Where there is possible confusion, an asterisk (*) is also used.

Electorate	Held by	Labor candidate	LCL candidate	DLP candidate	Other candidates
Adelaide	Labor	**Sam Lawn**		William Ahem	Elliott Johnston (Comm)
Albert	LCL		**Bill Nankivell**		
Alexandra	LCL	Ralph Dettman	**David Brookman**		Frank Halleday (Ind.)
Angas	LCL		**Berthold Teusner**		
Barossa	LCL		**Condor Laucke**		Fred Slater (Comm)
Burnside	LCL	Henry McMaster	**Joyce Steele**	Gordon Kimpton	Frank Rieck (Ind.)
Burra	Independent		John Bailey		**Percy Quirke** (Ind.)
Chaffey	LCL	Reg Curren	**Harold King**		
Edwardstown	Labor	**Frank Walsh**		Daniel Faulkner	
Enfield	Labor	**Jack Jennings**		Keith Cornell	
Eyre	LCL		**George Bockelberg**		
Flinders	LCL	James Hudson	**Glen Pearson**		
Frome	Labor	**Tom Casey**	Maxwell Hams	John McMahon	
Gawler	Labor	**John Clark**	Kevin Breen	Eduard Smulders	
Glenelg	LCL	Ian Charles	**Baden Pattinson**	Nathaniel Bishop	
Gouger	LCL		**Steele Hall**		
Gumeracha	LCL		**Thomas Playford**	Patrick Coffey	
Hindmarsh	Labor	**Cyril Hutchens**			
Light	LCL	Colin Wurst	John Freebairn		Eli Hambour (Ind.)
Millicent	Labor	Des Corcoran	Ren DeGaris	Neil Henderson	
Mitcham	LCL	Eric Thorp	**Robin Millhouse**	Edward Farrell	
Mount Gambier	Labor	**Ron Ralston**	Frank Haines		
Murray	Labor	**Gabe Bywaters**	Clement Wilkin		
Norwood	Labor	**Don Dunstan**	Richard Wegener	Francis Dempsey	
Onkaparinga	LCL	Peter Staniford	**Howard Shannon**		
Port Adelaide	Labor	**John Ryan**		George Basivovs	James Moss (Comm)
Port Pirie	Labor	**Dave McKee**			Ralph Rinaldi (Ind.)
Ridley	Independent	Darcy Nielsen	Jack Andrew		**Tom Stott** (Ind.)
Rocky River	LCL		**James Heaslip**		
Semaphore	Labor	**Harold Tapping**			
Stirling	LCL		**William Jenkins**		Clifford Thorpe (Ind.)
Stuart	Labor	**Lindsay Riches**			James Yates (Ind.)
Torrens	LCL	Chris Hurford	**John Coumbe**	Ursula Cock	
Unley	LCL	Gil Langley	**Colin Dunnage**		William Dempsey (Ind.)
Victoria	LCL	Alfred Donnelly	**Leslie Harding**		
Wallaroo	Labor	**Lloyd Hughes**	Arthur Philbey		
West Torrens	Labor	**Fred Walsh**	Parker Morton	Thomas Keain	
Whyalla	Labor	**Ron Loveday**			Allan Mossop (Ind.)
Yorke Peninsula	LCL		**Cecil Hincks**		

== Legislative Council ==
Sitting members are shown in bold text. Successful candidates are highlighted in the relevant colour and identified by an asterisk (*).

District	Held by	Labor candidates	LCL candidates	Other candidates
Central No. 1	2 Labor	**Alfred Kneebone***; **Bert Shard***		
Central No. 2	2 LCL	Margaret Scott; Robert Millar	**Frank Perry***; **Arthur Rymill***	Brian Nash (DLP)
Midland	2 LCL	Donald MacLeod; Cec Creedon	**Ross Story***; Boyd Dawkins*	
Northern	2 LCL	Hedley Clutterbuck; Bernard Threadgold	**Lyell McEwin***; Gordon Gilfillan*	
Southern	2 LCL		**Leslie Densley***; **Norman Jude***	
