= Members of the South Australian House of Assembly, 1956–1959 =

This is a list of members of the South Australian House of Assembly from 1956 to 1959, as elected at the 1956 state election:

Name	Party	Electorate	Term of office
George Bockelberg	LCL	Eyre	1956–1968
Hon David Brookman	LCL	Alexandra	1948–1973
Gabe Bywaters	Labor	Murray	1956–1968
John Clark	Labor	Gawler	1952–1973
Geoffrey Clarke	LCL	Burnside	1946–1959
Jim Corcoran	Labor	Millicent	1945–1947, 1953–1962
John Coumbe	LCL	Torrens	1956–1977
Charles Davis ^{[3]}	Labor	Port Pirie	1946–1959
Colin Dunnage	LCL	Unley	1941–1962
Don Dunstan	Labor	Norwood	1953–1979
John Fletcher ^{[2]}	Independent	Mount Gambier	1938–1958
Rufus Goldney	LCL	Gouger	1944–1959
George Hambour	LCL	Light	1956–1960
Leslie Harding	LCL	Victoria	1956–1965
James Heaslip	LCL	Rocky River	1949–1968
Leslie Heath ^{[1]}	LCL	Wallaroo	1956–1957
Hon Cecil Hincks	LCL	Yorke Peninsula	1941–1963
Lloyd Hughes ^{[1]}	Labor	Wallaroo	1957–1970
Cyril Hutchens	Labor	Hindmarsh	1950–1970
William Jenkins	LCL	Stirling	1952–1963
Joe Jennings	Labor	Enfield	1953–1977
Harold King	LCL	Chaffey	1956–1962
Condor Laucke	LCL	Barossa	1956–1965
Sam Lawn	Labor	Adelaide	1950–1971
Ron Loveday	Labor	Whyalla	1956–1970
Hon Sir Malcolm McIntosh	LCL	Albert	1921–1959
Robin Millhouse	LCL	Mitcham	1955–1982
Mick O'Halloran	Labor	Frome	1918–1921, 1924–1927, 1938–1960
Hon Baden Pattinson	LCL	Glenelg	1930–1938, 1947–1965
Glen Pearson	LCL	Flinders	1951–1970
Hon Thomas Playford	LCL	Gumeracha	1933–1968
Percy Quirke	Independent	Burra	1941–1968
Ron Ralston ^{[2]}	Labor	Mount Gambier	1958–1962
Lindsay Riches	Labor	Stuart	1933–1970
Howard Shannon	LCL	Onkaparinga	1933–1968
James Stephens	Labor	Port Adelaide	1933–1959
Tom Stott	Independent	Ridley	1933–1970
Harold Tapping	Labor	Semaphore	1946–1964
Berthold Teusner	LCL	Angas	1944–1970
Frank Walsh	Labor	Edwardstown	1941–1968
Fred Walsh	Labor	West Torrens	1942–1965

^{1} The LCL member for Wallaroo, Leslie Heath, died on 16 July 1957. Labor candidate Lloyd Hughes won the resulting by-election on 3 August 1957.
^{2} The Independent member for Mount Gambier, John Fletcher, died on 5 June 1958. Labor candidate Ron Ralston won the resulting by-election on 12 July 1958.
^{3} The Labor member for Port Pirie, Charles Davis, died on 27 January 1959. No by-election was held due to the imminent 1959 state election.
