= 1956 South Australian state election =

| ← 1953 | 3 March 1956 | 1959 → |

All 39 seats in the South Australian House of Assembly 20 seats were needed for a majority
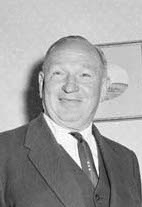

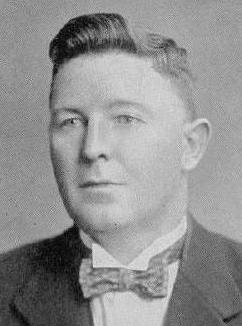
| | First party | Second party |
|---|---|---|
| Leader | Thomas Playford | Mick O'Halloran |
| Party | Liberal and Country League | Labor |
| Leader since | 5 November 1938 | 10 October 1949 |
| Leader's seat | Gumeracha | Frome |
| Last election | 21 seats | 14 seats |
| Seats won | 21 seats | 15 seats |
| Seat change | 0 | ▲1 |
| Percentage | 51.3% | 48.7% |
| Swing | ▲4.3 | ▼4.3 |
- A map of South Australian electorates from 1955 to 1969, during the height of the Playmander.
Premier before election
Thomas Playford
Liberal and Country League
Elected Premier
Thomas Playford
Liberal and Country League

State elections were held in South Australia on 3 March 1956. All 39 seats in the South Australian House of Assembly were up for election. The incumbent Liberal and Country League led by Premier of South Australia Thomas Playford IV defeated the Australian Labor Party led by Leader of the Opposition Mick O'Halloran.

A redistribution occurred in 1955 based upon the results of the census held in June 1954.

== Background ==
Labor won one seat, rural Murray from the LCL. The LCL won two seats, rural Wallaroo from Labor and rural Chaffey from an independent. An independent won one seat, rural Burra from the LCL.

== Results ==
Arrangement of the House of Assembly after the 1956 state election.

South Australian state election, 3 March 1956 House of Assembly << 1953–1959 >>
| Enrolled voters | 299,048 | | | | |
| Votes cast | 280,811 | | Turnout | 93.90% | –1.11% |
| Informal votes | 6,702 | | Informal | 2.39% | –0.54% |
Summary of votes by party
| Party | Primary votes | % | Swing | Seats | Change |
| Labor | 129,853 | 47.37% | –3.60% | 15 | ± 0 |
| Liberal and Country | 100,569 | 36.69% | +0.24% | 21 | + 1 |
| Labor (A-C) | 20,384 | 7.44% | * | 0 | ± 0 |
| Communist | 3,185 | 1.16% | –0.32% | 0 | ± 0 |
| Independent | 20,118 | 7.34% | –3.76% | 3 | – 1 |
| Total | 274,109 | | | 39 | |
Two-party-preferred
| Liberal and Country | | 51.30% | +4.30% | | |
| Labor | | 48.70% | –4.30% | | |

- The primary vote figures were from contested seats, while the state-wide two-party-preferred vote figures were estimated from all seats.

== Post-election pendulum ==
LCL seats (21)
Marginal
| Wallaroo | Leslie Heath | LCL | 2.0% |
| Chaffey | Harold King | LCL | 5.2% v IND |
Fairly safe
| Glenelg | Baden Pattinson | LCL | 8.0% |
| Torrens | John Coumbe | LCL | 8.2% |
Safe
| Unley | Colin Dunnage | LCL | 10.2% |
| Victoria | Leslie Harding | LCL | 11.7% |
| Onkaparinga | Howard Shannon | LCL | 20.1% v IND |
| Gouger | Rufus Goldney | LCL | 20.5% v IND |
| Angas | Berthold Teusner | LCL | 27.6% v IND |
| Gumeracha | Thomas Playford | LCL | 38.6% v COM |
| Eyre | George Bockelberg | LCL | undistributed |
| Albert | Malcolm McIntosh | LCL | unopposed |
| Alexandra | David Brookman | LCL | unopposed |
| Barossa | Condor Laucke | LCL | unopposed |
| Burnside | Geoffrey Clarke | LCL | unopposed |
| Flinders | Glen Pearson | LCL | unopposed |
| Light | George Hambour | LCL | unopposed |
| Mitcham | Robin Millhouse | LCL | unopposed |
| Rocky River | James Heaslip | LCL | unopposed |
| Stirling | William Jenkins | LCL | unopposed |
| Yorke Peninsula | Cecil Hincks | LCL | unopposed |

Labor seats (15)
Marginal
| Murray | Gabe Bywaters | ALP | 1.4% |
| West Torrens | Fred Walsh | ALP | 1.4% |
| Millicent | Jim Corcoran | ALP | 2.3% |
| Frome | Mick O'Halloran | ALP | 4.3% |
Fairly safe
| Norwood | Don Dunstan | ALP | 7.2% |
Safe
| Enfield | Joe Jennings | ALP | 17.9% |
| Edwardstown | Frank Walsh | ALP | 24.3% v DLP |
| Adelaide | Sam Lawn | ALP | 31.7% v DLP |
| Port Adelaide | James Stephens | ALP | 32.1% v DLP |
| Gawler | John Clark | ALP | unopposed |
| Hindmarsh | Cyril Hutchens | ALP | unopposed |
| Port Pirie | Charles Davis | ALP | unopposed |
| Semaphore | Harold Tapping | ALP | unopposed |
| Stuart | Lindsay Riches | ALP | unopposed |
| Whyalla | Ron Loveday | ALP | unopposed |
Crossbench seats (3)
| Burra | Percy Quirke | IND | 1.2% v LCL |
| Mount Gambier | John Fletcher | IND | 6.1% v ALP |
| Ridley | Tom Stott | IND | 11.0% v LCL |

== See also ==
- Results of the South Australian state election, 1956 (House of Assembly)
- Candidates of the 1956 South Australian state election
- Members of the South Australian House of Assembly, 1956-1959
- Members of the South Australian Legislative Council, 1956-1959
- Playmander
