= Members of the South Australian House of Assembly, 1938–1941 =

This is a list of members of the South Australian House of Assembly from 1938 to 1941, as elected at the 1938 state election:

Name	Party	Electorate	Term of office
Charles Abbott	LCL	Burnside	1933–1946
Doug Bardolph	Independent	Adelaide	1933–1944
Hon Richard Layton Butler ^{[1]}	LCL	Light	1915–1918, 1921–1938
Arthur Christian	LCL	Eyre	1933–1956
George Connor	Independent	Alexandra	1934–1941
Edward Craigie	Single Tax League	Flinders	1930–1941
Daniel Davies	Independent	Yorke Peninsula	1933–1941
Leslie Duncan	Labor	Gawler	1938–1952
Henry Dunks	LCL	Mitcham	1933–1955
Herbert Dunn	Independent/LCL ^{[3]}	Stirling	1938–1952
William Fisk ^{[2]}	Independent	Glenelg	1938–1940
John Fletcher	Independent	Mount Gambier	1938–1958
George Illingworth	Independent	Goodwood	1938–1941
Hon Shirley Jeffries	LCL	Torrens	1927–1930, 1933–1944, 1947–1953
Hon George Jenkins	LCL	Newcastle	1918–1924, 1927–1930, 1933–1956
Andrew Lacey	Labor	Port Pirie	1933–1946
Jules Langdon	Independent	Thebarton	1938–1942
John Lyons	LCL	Rocky River	1926–1948
William Macgillivray	Independent	Chaffey	1938–1956
Archibald McDonald	LCL	Burra	1933–1947
Hon John McInnes	Labor	Hindmarsh	1918–1950
Hon Malcolm McIntosh	LCL	Albert	1921–1959
Richard McKenzie	Independent	Murray	1938–1953
John McLeay, senior	Independent	Unley	1938–1941
Alexander Melrose	LCL	Stanley	1933–1941
Herbert Michael ^{[1]}	LCL	Light	1939–1941, 1944–1956
Hon Robert Nicholls	LCL	Young	1915–1956
Frank Nieass	Labor	Norwood	1930–1933, 1938–1941, 1944–1947
Mick O'Halloran	Labor	Frome	1918–1921, 1924–1927, 1938–1960
Thomas Playford	LCL	Gumeracha	1933–1968
Hon Robert Richards	Labor	Wallaroo	1918–1949
Lindsay Riches	Labor	Stuart	1933–1970
Albert Robinson	Independent	Gouger	1915–1924, 1934–1943
Reginald Rudall	LCL	Angas	1933–1944
Howard Shannon	LCL	Onkaparinga	1933–1968
Clement Smith	Independent	Victoria	1938–1941
James Stephens	Labor	Port Adelaide	1933–1959
Tom Stott	Independent	Ridley	1933–1970
Albert Thompson	Labor	Semaphore	1930–1946
Elder Whittle	LCL	Prospect	1938–1944, 1947–1953

^{1} Light LCL MHA and Premier Richard Layton Butler resigned on 5 November 1938 in order to contest a by-election for the federal seat of Wakefield. LCL candidate Herbert Michael won the resulting by-election on 21 January 1939.
^{2} Glenelg independent MHA William Fisk died on 18 December 1940. No by-election was held due to the imminent 1941 state election.
^{3} Stirling independent MHA Herbert Dunn joined the LCL in 1940.
