= Members of the South Australian House of Assembly, 1941–1944 =

This is a list of members of the South Australian House of Assembly from 1941 to 1944, as elected at the 1941 state election:

Name	Party	Electorate	Term of office
Charles Abbott	LCL	Burnside	1933–1946
Doug Bardolph	Independent	Adelaide	1933–1944
Horace Bowden ^{[2]}	Labor	Gouger	1943–1944
Arthur Christian	LCL	Eyre	1933–1956
Leslie Duncan	Labor	Gawler	1938–1952
Henry Dunks	LCL	Mitcham	1933–1955
Herbert Dunn	LCL ^{[3]}	Stirling	1938–1952
Colin Dunnage	LCL	Unley	1941–1962
John Fletcher	Independent	Mount Gambier	1938–1958
Cecil Hincks	LCL	Yorke Peninsula	1941–1963
Hon Sir Herbert Hudd	LCL	Alexandra	1912–1915, 1920–1938, 1941–1948
Hon Shirley Jeffries	LCL	Torrens	1927–1930, 1933–1944, 1947–1953
Hon George Jenkins	LCL	Newcastle	1918–1924, 1927–1930, 1933–1956
Andrew Lacey	Labor	Port Pirie	1933–1946
Jules Langdon ^{[1]}	Independent	Thebarton	1938–1942
John Lyons	LCL	Rocky River	1926–1948
William Macgillivray	Independent	Chaffey	1938–1956
Archibald McDonald	LCL	Burra	1933–1947
Sydney McHugh	Labor	Light	1924–1927, 1930–1933, 1941–1944
Hon John McInnes	Labor	Hindmarsh	1918–1950
Hon Malcolm McIntosh	LCL	Albert	1921–1959
Richard McKenzie	Independent/ALP ^{[4]}	Murray	1938–1953
Hon Sir Robert Nicholls	LCL	Young	1915–1956
Roy Moir	LCL	Norwood	1941–1944, 1947–1953
Mick O'Halloran	Labor	Frome	1918–1921, 1924–1927, 1938–1960
Rex Pearson	LCL	Flinders	1941–1951
Vernon Petherick	LCL	Victoria	1918–1924, 1932–1938, 1941–1945
Hon Thomas Playford	LCL	Gumeracha	1933–1968
Percy Quirke	Labor	Stanley	1941–1968
Hon Robert Richards	Labor	Wallaroo	1918–1949
Lindsay Riches	Labor	Stuart	1933–1970
Albert Robinson ^{[2]}	Independent	Gouger	1915–1924, 1934–1943
Hon Reginald Rudall	LCL	Angas	1933–1944
Howard Shannon	LCL	Onkaparinga	1933–1968
Frank Smith	LCL	Glenelg	1941–1947
James Stephens	Labor	Port Adelaide	1933–1959
Tom Stott	Independent	Ridley	1933–1970
Albert Thompson	Labor	Semaphore	1930–1946
Frank Walsh	Labor	Goodwood	1941–1968
Fred Walsh ^{[1]}	Labor	Thebarton	1942–1965
Elder Whittle	LCL	Prospect	1938–1944, 1947–1953

^{1} Thebarton independent MHA Jules Langdon died on 2 November 1942. Labor candidate Fred Walsh won the resulting by-election on 12 December.
^{2} Gouger independent MHA Albert Robinson died on 25 May 1943. Labor candidate Horace Bowden won the resulting by-election on 10 July.
^{3} Stirling MHA Herbert Dunn had joined the LCL in 1940, but was defeated for preselection. He ran as an unendorsed LCL candidate in 1941, and sat as an LCL member on his election.
^{4} Murray MHA Richard McKenzie was elected to his second term as an independent in 1941, but joined the Labor Party in September 1943.
