= Members of the South Australian Legislative Council, 1950–1953 =

This is a list of members of the South Australian Legislative Council from 1950 to 1953.

Name	District	Party	Term expiry	Time in office
Ernest Anthoney	Central No. 2	LCL	1953	1941–1959
Ken Bardolph	Central No. 1	Labor	1953	1941–1964
Stan Bevan ^{[1]}	Central No. 1	Labor	1953	1951–1970
Jack Bice	Southern	LCL	1953	1941–1959
Frank Condon	Central No. 1	Labor	1956	1928–1961
John Lancelot Cowan	Southern	LCL	1953	1949–1959
Collier Cudmore	Central No. 2	LCL	1953	1933–1959
Leslie Harold Densley	Southern	LCL	1956	1944–1967
Sir Walter Gordon Duncan	Midland	LCL	1956	1918–1962
Harry Edmonds	Northern	LCL	1956	1944–1962
Bert Hoare	Central No. 1	Labor	1956	1944–1956
Norman Jude	Southern	LCL	1956	1944–1971
Lyell McEwin	Northern	LCL	1956	1934–1975
Alexander Melrose	Midland	LCL	1953	1941–1962
Oscar Oates ^{[1]}	Central No. 1	Labor	1953	1933–1951
Frank Perry	Central No. 2	LCL	1956	1947–1965
William Walsh Robinson	Northern	LCL	1953	1947–1965
Colin Rowe	Midland	LCL	1953	1948–1970
Reginald Rudall	Midland	LCL	1956	1944–1955
Sir James Wallace Sandford	Central No. 2	LCL	1956	1938–1956
Robert Richard Wilson	Northern	LCL	1953	1949–1965

^{1} Labor MLC Oscar Oates died on 2 September 1951. Stan Bevan was elected unopposed to the vacancy on 24 October.
