= Members of the South Australian Legislative Council, 1947–1950 =

This is a list of members of the South Australian Legislative Council from 1947 to 1950.

Name	District	Party	Term expiry	Time in office
Ernest Anthoney	Central No. 2	LCL	1953	1941–1959
Ken Bardolph	Central No. 1	Labor	1953	1941–1964
Norman Brookman ^{[3]}	Southern	LCL	1953	1941–1949
Jack Bice	Southern	LCL	1953	1941–1959
Percy Blesing ^{[2]}	Northern	LCL	1953	1924–1949
Frank Condon	Central No. 1	Labor	1950	1928–1961
John Lancelot Cowan ^{[3]}	Southern	LCL	1953	1949–1959
Sir Collier Cudmore	Central No. 2	LCL	1953	1933–1959
Leslie Harold Densley	Southern	LCL	1950	1944–1967
Sir Walter Gordon Duncan	Midland	LCL	1950	1918–1962
Harry Edmonds	Northern	LCL	1950	1944–1962
Douglas Peel Gordon ^{[1]}	Midland	LCL	1953	1947–1948
Bert Hoare	Central No. 1	Labor	1950	1944–1956
Norman Jude	Southern	LCL	1950	1944–1971
Sir Lyell McEwin	Northern	LCL	1950	1934–1975
Alexander Melrose	Midland	LCL	1953	1941–1962
Oscar Oates	Central No. 1	Labor	1953	1933–1951
Frank Perry	Central No. 2	LCL	1950	1947–1965
William Walsh Robinson	Northern	LCL	1953	1947–1953
Colin Rowe ^{[1]}	Midland	LCL	1953	1948–1970
Reginald Rudall	Midland	LCL	1950	1944–1955
Sir James Wallace Sandford	Central No. 2	LCL	1950	1938–1956
Robert Richard Wilson ^{[2]}	Northern	LCL	1953	1949–1965

^{1} LCL MLC Douglas Peel Gordon died on 9 October 1948. Colin Rowe was elected unopposed to the vacancy on 1 November.
^{2} LCL MLC Percy Blesing died on 2 March 1949. Robert Richard Wilson won the resulting by-election on 14 May.
^{3} LCL MLC Norman Brookman died on 26 April 1949. John Lancelot Cowan was elected unopposed to the vacancy on 26 May.
