= Members of the South Australian Legislative Council, 1953–1956 =

This is a list of members of the South Australian Legislative Council from 1953 to 1956.

Name	District	Party	Term expiry	Time in office
Ernest Anthoney	Central No. 2	LCL	1959	1941–1959
Ken Bardolph	Central No. 1	Labor	1959	1941–1964
Stan Bevan	Central No. 1	Labor	1959	1951–1970
Jack Bice	Southern	LCL	1959	1941–1959
Frank Condon	Central No. 1	Labor	1956	1928–1961
John Lancelot Cowan	Southern	LCL	1959	1949–1959
Collier Cudmore	Central No. 2	LCL	1959	1933–1959
Leslie Harold Densley	Southern	LCL	1956	1944–1967
Sir Walter Gordon Duncan	Midland	LCL	1956	1918–1962
Harry Edmonds	Northern	LCL	1956	1944–1962
Bert Hoare	Central No. 1	Labor	1956	1944–1956
Norman Jude	Southern	LCL	1956	1944–1971
Sir Lyell McEwin	Northern	LCL	1956	1934–1975
Alexander Melrose	Midland	LCL	1959	1941–1962
Sir Frank Perry	Central No. 2	LCL	1956	1947–1965
William Walsh Robinson	Northern	LCL	1959	1953–1965
Colin Rowe	Midland	LCL	1959	1948–1970
Reginald Rudall ^{[1]}	Midland	LCL	1956	1944–1955
Sir James Wallace Sandford	Central No. 2	LCL	1956	1938–1956
Ross Story ^{[1]}	Midland	LCL	1956	1955–1975
Robert Richard Wilson	Northern	LCL	1959	1949–1965

^{1} LCL MLC Reginald Rudall died on 1 January 1955. Ross Story was elected to the vacancy on 26 February.
