= Members of the South Australian Legislative Council, 1956–1959 =

This is a list of members of the South Australian Legislative Council from 1956 to 1959.

Name	District	Party	Term expiry	Time in office
Ernest Anthoney	Central No. 2	LCL	1959	1941–1959
Ken Bardolph	Central No. 1	Labor	1959	1941–1964
Stan Bevan	Central No. 1	Labor	1959	1951–1970
Jack Bice	Southern	LCL	1959	1941–1959
Frank Condon	Central No. 1	Labor	1962	1928–1961
John Lancelot Cowan	Southern	LCL	1959	1949–1959
Sir Collier Cudmore	Central No. 2	LCL	1959	1933–1959
Leslie Harold Densley	Southern	LCL	1962	1944–1967
Sir Walter Gordon Duncan	Midland	LCL	1962	1918–1962
Harry Edmonds	Northern	LCL	1962	1944–1962
Norman Jude	Southern	LCL	1962	1944–1971
Sir Lyell McEwin	Northern	LCL	1962	1934–1975
Alexander Melrose	Midland	LCL	1959	1941–1962
Sir Frank Perry	Central No. 2	LCL	1962	1947–1965
William Walsh Robinson	Northern	LCL	1959	1953–1965
Colin Rowe	Midland	LCL	1959	1948–1970
Sir Arthur Rymill	Central No. 2	LCL	1962	1956–1975
Bert Shard	Central No. 1	Labor	1962	1956–1975
Ross Story	Midland	LCL	1962	1955–1975
Robert Richard Wilson	Northern	LCL	1959	1949–1965
