= Leslie Nicholson =

Australian politician

Leslie Charles Nicholson, was an Australian politician who represented the South Australian House of Assembly seat of Light from 1960 to 1962, for the Liberal and Country League.

He was previously the chairman of the District Council of Eudunda from 1950 to 1951.

Civic offices
Preceded by Hermann Oskar Leditschke	Chairman of the District Council of Eudunda; 1950-1951	Succeeded by George Hambour
Parliament of South Australia
Preceded by George Hambour	Member for Light; 1960–1962	Succeeded by John Freebairn
