= Leo Travers =

Australian lawyer and politician

John Leo Travers (20 October 1899 – 23 February 1979) was an Australian lawyer and politician who represented the South Australian House of Assembly seat of Torrens from 1953 to 1956 for the Liberal and Country League.

Travers was later appointed as a judge in the Supreme Court of South Australia. He served in that capacity from 14 May 1962 to 19 October 1969.

Travers had served in the Legal Corp of the Australian Army during World War II.

He is buried in the Catholic section of Centennial Park Cemetery.
