= Bert Hoare =

Australian politician (1874–1962)

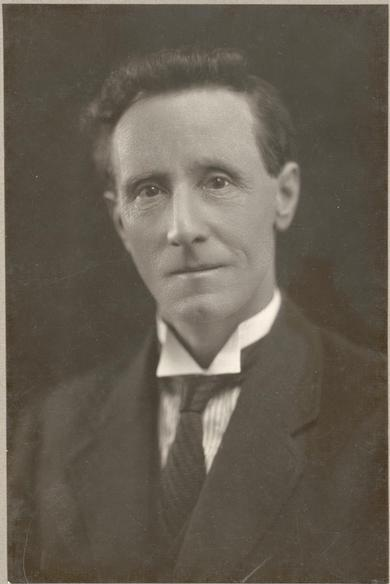

Senator for South Australia
- In office 16 December 1922 – 30 June 1935
- Preceded by: Edward Vardon

Personal details
- Born: 22 November 1874 Alberton, South Australia
- Died: 25 January 1962 (aged 87) Adelaide, South Australia
- Party: Labor
- Spouse: Ida Mary Hancock
- Occupation: Labourer

Albert Alfred Hoare (22 November 1874 – 25 January 1962) was a South Australian politician.

Born in Alberton, South Australia, he was educated at Port Adelaide and Mount Barker state schools. He worked as a farm labourer at Boolcunda East, near Quorn for sixteen years, and worked as shearer for 20 years. He was employed, perhaps as a storeman, at the Government workshops in Glanville, before running his own dairy farm. He returned to government service at the Islington Railway Workshops of the South Australian Railways.

In 1921 he contested the South Australian House of Assembly seat of Murray, but was unsuccessful. In 1922 he was elected to the Australian Senate as an Australian Labor Party Senator for South Australia, succeeding Liberal Edward Vardon. He held the seat until his defeat in 1934. In 1944, he returned to politics as a Labor member of the South Australian Legislative Council, serving until 1956.

He was a prominent member of the Australian Natives' Association, a member of the Labor Party's Port Adelaide electorate committee and President of the Port Adelaide Workers' Educational Association.

Politically he was a labour moderate, opposing conscription for overseas military service in World War I and post-war labour militancy, and advocating for closer settlement through the breaking up of larger agricultural estates. A protectionist during the Depression era, he supported immigration from Britain and northwestern Europe (and thus the White Australia policy), but not at the cost of Australian jobs.

== Family ==
Bert married Ida Mary Hancock on 19 April 1913; they had eight children, and lived at Hodgeman Road, Pennington, then 19 Torrens Road, Alberton.
