= Alan Finger =

Australian medical practitioner and member of the Communist Party of Australia

- Born: 6 December 1909; Dandenong, Victoria, Australia
- Died: 24 January 1985 (aged 75); Heidelberg, Victoria, Australia
- Spouse(s): 1. Joan Mary Hardiman (1934–1947, 1982–1985); 2. Jean Isobel Sams (1949–1978)
- Children: 3

Alan Henry Finger (6 December 1909 – 24 January 1985) was an Australian medical practitioner and a member of the Communist Party of Australia.

He was born in Dandenong, Victoria, to farmer Philip Charles Henry Finger and Minnie, née Freeman. He attended Maryborough and Melbourne High schools and then the University of Melbourne, from which he graduated in 1934. He joined the Communist Party of Australia in 1933. Finger married Joan Mary Hardiman, a journalist active in the Communist Party, on 8 December 1934.

Finger was resident medical officer at Royal Melbourne Hospital in 1935, but moved to South Australia in 1936 to become outpatients' registrar at the Royal Adelaide Hospital. He soon transferred to the Metropolitan Infectious Diseases Hospital in Northfield, later being promoted superintendent. He remained at the hospital for eleven years, and in 1941 received a diploma of public health from the University of Sydney.

Finger and his wife were important in the revival of the South Australian branch of the Communist Party. He contested state and federal elections consistently between 1943 and 1967, but after Nikita Khrushchev's 1956 revelations about Joseph Stalin's government he focused more on issues such as the peace movement. Finger moved to Broken Hill in 1947, in which year he and his wife divorced. In 1949, after returning to Pennington in Adelaide, he married Jean Isobel Sams, née Marshall, a fellow divorcee, on 12 December. He was a full-time officer with the Department of Public Health from 1969 to 1975 and was recognised for his work on venereal diseases. He retired in 1977 and worked for a community health service in Kalgoorlie. Following Jean's death in 1978, he returned to South Australia and remarried his first wife, who had also been widowed. Finger died at Heidelberg on 24 January 1985 and was cremated.
