= George Hambour =

Australian politician

George Hambour (1 April 1904 – 25 March 1960) was an Australian politician who represented the South Australian House of Assembly seat of Light from 1956 to 1960 for the Liberal and Country League.

He was also the chairman of the District Council of Eudunda from 1951 to 1957.

Civic offices
Preceded by Herbert Michael	Chairman of the District Council of Eudunda; 1951–1957	Succeeded by Leslie Nicholson
Parliament of South Australia
Preceded by Herbert Michael	Member for Light; 1956–1960	Succeeded by Leslie Nicholson
