= James Wallace Sandford =

Australian politician and businessman (1879–1958)

Sir James Wallace Sandford
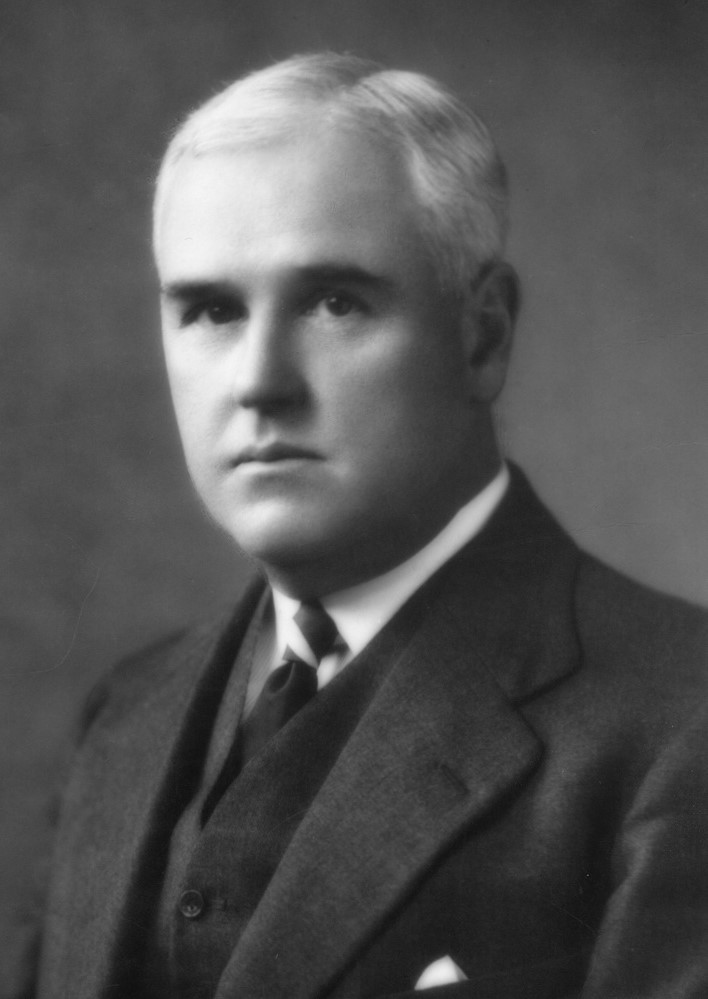
- Born: 20 March 1879; Footscray, Victoria
- Died: 9 July 1958 (aged 79)
- Occupations: Businessman and politician

Sir James Wallace Sandford (20 March 1879 – 9 July 1958), usually referred to as J. Wallace Sandford and later as simply Wallace Sandford, was a businessman and politician in the State of South Australia.

== History ==
Sandford was born in Footscray, Victoria the eldest son of Scottish-born businessman Alexander Wallace Sandford. They moved to Adelaide in 1880, where the dairy products business of A. W. Sandford & Co. had moved its head office. James was educated at St Peter's College and Roseworthy Agricultural College, then the University of London.

He joined A. W. Sandford & Co. in 1901; his father died in 1906 and James took over control of the company, which had diversified into an importer of agricultural machinery, in 1911. He was by this time generally referred to as simply "Wallace Sandford".

== Politics ==
In 1931 Wallace Sandford was appointed chairman of a three-man committee (with Professor J. McKellar Stewart and the Director of Education, William J. Adey) to enquiry into the cost of education. The panel recommended severe cost-cutting measures, which included the introduction of school fees, increases in the minimum sizes of country schools, amalgamation of high schools, and entrance examinations to high schools in order to halve enrolments. Adey signed a minority report.

In 1938 Sir Wallace, as he had become, was elected as a Liberal member of the Legislative Council for the Central No.2 district. His politics were influenced by loyalty to the British Empire and the laissez-faire belief that capitalists should be relatively free from interference by Government.

== Other interests ==
He was a director on the boards of the Adelaide Cement Co. Ltd, Sun Insurance and the South Australian Gas Company.

He acted as honorary consul in Adelaide for Sweden for 17 years.

He was a keen golfer.

== Recognition ==
He was knighted in 1937.

He was appointed Knight Commander, Royal Order of Vasa in 1932.

== Family ==
He married Kate Irene "Kittie" MacLeod on 10 April 1907. They had one daughter, born 21 September 1911 and one son, born 1 May 1916. They had a home at Avenel Gardens Medindie, then on East Terrace, Adelaide and a summer residence at Mount Lofty.
