= Ernest Anthoney =

Australian politician

Ernest "Ern" Anthoney (12 September 1879 – 9 December 1961) was a schoolteacher, mayor and politician in South Australia.

== History ==
Anthoney was born in Horsham, Sussex as the eldest son of William George Anthoney (1854 – 23 August 1913), a butcher, and his wife Eleanor Woodman Anthoney, née Master, (1855 – 23 May 1923) who emigrated to Sydney sometime before 1888.

He received his early education in England, then in Sydney. He was appointed house master at the Rockhampton Grammar School, Queensland, then joined the staff of the All Saints College, Bathurst. In 1909, he moved to Adelaide, where he was appointed resident master at Prince Alfred College, meanwhile undertaking studies at the University of Adelaide. He was appointed Lieutenant with the Army Cadet Corps (resigned April 1910). He joined the State Education Department, and served as relief teacher at Booleroo in 1910, Long Plains in 1912; Goodwood in 1915; Heathfield in 1916; Flinders Street and Cowandilla in 1917; Beachport school in 1918. His wife Edith taught sewing at several of these schools. He resigned from the service in 1918.

He undertook community work as organiser for Minda Home, as the organising secretary of the Town Planning Association, and organising secretary of the Legion of Frontiersmen. He was elected councillor to the Brighton Corporation, and was appointed to the Metropolitan County Board, the executive of the Suburban Areas Association, and the Brighton Branch of the Liberal Union as Hon. Secretary. He served as Mayor of Brighton in 1923 and 1924. He was also at various times involved with the School of Mines, Institutes Association, Workers' Educational Association council. Unley High School council, Brighton Institute, Boy Scouts council. Unemployment Relief Council, S.A. Bands Association, S.A. Literary and Musical Competitions committee, and S.A. Community Singing Committee. He served on the council of the University of Adelaide for 17 years, as secretary of S.A. Town planning Association, and chairman of the Glenelg Football Club. -

== Politics ==
In 1921 he was elected to the House of Assembly seat of Sturt for the Liberal Party, and held it until 1938. In 1941 he was elected to a Legislative Council Central district seat for the Liberal and Country League, and held it until 1959.

== Family ==
He had a brother William Anthoney (c. 1883 – 25 June 1939) of Leichhardt, New South Wales, who fought with AIF in World War I.

He married Edith Ashton of Norwood (daughter of James Ashton and sister of Will Ashton, both painters) on 22 December 1909. For most of his political life his address was 34, The Crescent, Brighton. Their only child, Rex Ashton Anthoney, married Sylvia Cornish in 1938.

Wayne Anthoney (born 1940), South Australian actor and professional clown, is a grandson.
