= Colin Rowe (politician) =

Australian lawyer and politician

Colin Davies Rowe (12 April 1911 – 2 August 1970) was a lawyer and politician in South Australia. He served as 37th Attorney-General of South Australia from 1955 to 1965.

== History ==
He was born the eldest son Mr and Mrs. L. G. Rowe of "Rockleigh", Sandilands, about 6 miles (10 km) south-west of Ardrossan, and educated at Kadina High School and King's College, Adelaide, where he was head prefect for two consecutive years. He studied law at the University of Adelaide, gaining his LLB in 1934, and was admitted to the bar in December 1934 at the same ceremony as Roma Mitchell. He worked as a lawyer at Ardrossan, then set up in practice at Maitland in 1942. He was chairman of the Maitland Hospital Board, secretary of the Yorke Peninsula Local Government Association, and secretary of the Ardrossan Hospital.

In 1948 he was president of the Yorke Peninsula branch of the Liberal and Country League, and in November 1948 was nominated by them, unopposed, to a Midland district seat in the Legislative Council made vacant by the death of Douglas Peel Gordon. He retained the seat until 1970.

== Family ==
He married Elsie Dorothy Macklin of Brighton on 22 October 1938. They had at least two children:

- son 7 January 1941
- daughter 10 April 1947

Political offices
Preceded by Thomas Playford IV	Attorney-General of South Australia; 1955-1965	Succeeded by Don Dunstan
Preceded by Malcolm McIntosh	Minister for Works; 1958	Succeeded by Glen Pearson
South Australian Legislative Council
Preceded by Douglas Peel Gordon	Member for Midland District; 1948–1970	Succeeded by Keith Russack
