= Robert Richard Wilson =

Australian farmer and politician

Robert Richard Wilson (29 May 1891 – 26 Apr 1969) was a farmer and politician in South Australia.

== History ==
Born at Ardrossan, South Australia, he was for many years a successful farmer, grazier and dairyman of Yeelanna, South Australia. He was President of the Yeelanna Mutual Improvement Society, and Secretary of the Agricultural Bureau. He was on the board of Urrbrae Agricultural High School and a State vice-president of the Returned Sailors', Soldiers' and Airmen's Imperial League of Australia.

He served in the Legislative Council for the Liberal and Country League from 14 May 1949 to 5 March 1965, after filling a vacancy left by the death of Albert Percy Blesing.

== Family ==
He married Hilda; they had one son and four daughters:

- Robert John "Bob" Wilson (31 July 1922 – 1 November 1943) pilot with RAAF; killed in aircraft accident at Geraldton, Western Australia.
- Joan Beatrice Wilson (15 July 1924 – )
- Shirley May Wilson 1927- 1998
- Ruth (1929- 1994) married (divorced) Elliot Bobrige (11 February 1931 - 24 March 2017)
- Margaret

Sometime before May 1949 they moved to Stephen Terrace, Gilberton.
