= Ken Bardolph =

Australian politician

Member of the South Australian Legislative Council
- In office 29 March 1941 – 9 November 1964
- Preceded by: Stanley Whitford
- Succeeded by: Don Banfield
- Constituency: Central District No. 1

Personal details
- Born: 11 August 1895 Manly, New South Wales, Australia
- Died: 9 November 1964 (aged 69) Adelaide, South Australia, Australia
- Party: Labor
- Other political affiliations: Lang Labor (1930s)
- Spouse: Mary Dineen (m. 1927)
- Relatives: Doug Bardolph (brother)
- Occupation: Journalist

Kenneth Edward Joseph Bardolph (11 August 1895 – 9 November 1964), mostly referred to as "K. E. Bardolph", was an Australian politician.

== Early life ==
Henry Bardolph (ca.1854 – 22 June 1933) and Mary Bardolph (née Taggart) had five sons, and lived at Manly, New South Wales, where they ran a refreshment room or wine bar. They moved to Victoria, where two sons (Donald Francis Bardolph and Harold Travers Bardolph) died of pneumonic influenza within a few days of each other in the epidemic of 1919, aged 31 and 28 respectively. The family moved to Adelaide around 1919; Henry set up in business as building contractor, notably responsible for the Unley Oval grandstand. Their youngest son, (Clement Patrick) Charles Bardolph, died in Adelaide in September 1926 aged 29 years.

Ken was the second youngest. He was an architect and journalist before entering politics.

== Politics ==
His elder brother Doug, with whom he was closely associated, was a prominent trade unionist. Ken was a member of the Federated Clerks' Union in 1928 when the Federated Confectioners' Association was persuaded to have him and brother Doug nominated to the Australian Labor Party (ALP) conference as candidates for Central No.1 seats at Legislative Council election. Neither was elected.

In January 1930 both brothers contested the ALP plebiscite to select candidates for the upcoming State elections. After a series of unsworn allegations of collusion and vote buying at the preselection ballot, a three-man committee of enquiry (Sampson, Burgess and Grealy) had both brothers sacked from the ALP; they formed the Lang Labor Party, a South Australian section of the Lang Labor movement, which attracted a sizeable following among workers disaffected with both major parties' response to the high and growing unemployment during the Great Depression. Lang Labor made a clean sweep of the three-member Adelaide electoral district in the House of Assembly in 1933.

Bardolph was the proprietor of Labour Weekly, a Lang Labor newspaper. In 1932, following Lang's dismissal, he sued the New South Wales state government for breach of contract when it rescinded an advertising contract for the NSW Government Tourism Bureau that Lang had authorised. The case found its way to the High Court, which in Bardolph v New South Wales ruled in favour of Bardolph and established the principle that explicit statute law was not necessary for the state government to enter into contracts and expend funds.

In an effort to reclaim members lost to Lang Labor and the Parliamentary Labor Party, the ALP rescinded all expulsions in 1934. Eventually, in 1941, Ken was elected to a Central District No. 1 seat on the Legislative Council, which he retained until his death.

In 1946, by a narrow margin, he was sacked from the Trades and Labor Council on the grounds he was not a bona fide organiser of the Confectioners' Union. This despite the fact he had been delegate of the Council over many years and its president for two years.

== Family ==
On 29 March 1927 he married Mary Josephine "Mollie" Dineen; their children were Donald, June, Ann, Helen, Kenneth, Marie, and Therese.

His older brother Doug was the member for Adelaide in the House of Assembly from 1933 until 1944. His other brothers were Donald Francis Bardolph (ca.1887 – January 1919), Harold Travers Bardolph (ca.1890 – 28 January 1919), and (Clement Patrick) Charles Bardolph (ca.1897 – September 1926).
