= Jack Bice =

Australian politician

John Leonard Sandoe Bice (1 December 1884 – 16 July 1967) was a politician in the State of South Australia.

== History ==
He was a son of Sir John George Bice KCMG (1853–1923) and Elizabeth Jane Bice née Trewenack. Sir John was a member of the Legislative Council for 30 years, and Chief Secretary for a lengthy period.

John L. S. Bice served overseas with the 43rd Battalion AIF in the First World War, and on returning took up farming in Keith. He was appointed an inspector of soldier settlement; and was a member of the relief board. He was appointed a member of the Southern Valuation Board under the Land Tax Act. He served on the District Council of Noarlunga.

Bice was a successful Liberal and Country League candidate for a Southern district seat on the Legislative Council in 1941, and retained the seat until February 1959.

== Family ==
Bice married Hilda Lilian Coombs of "Baroona", St. Peters on 20 November 1918. They had two daughters: Hilda Joan (10 February 1919 – 29 September 2003) and Betty Constance (20 September 1921 – 20 September 2014).
