= Walter Gordon Duncan =

Australian politician

The Honourable Sir Walter Duncan
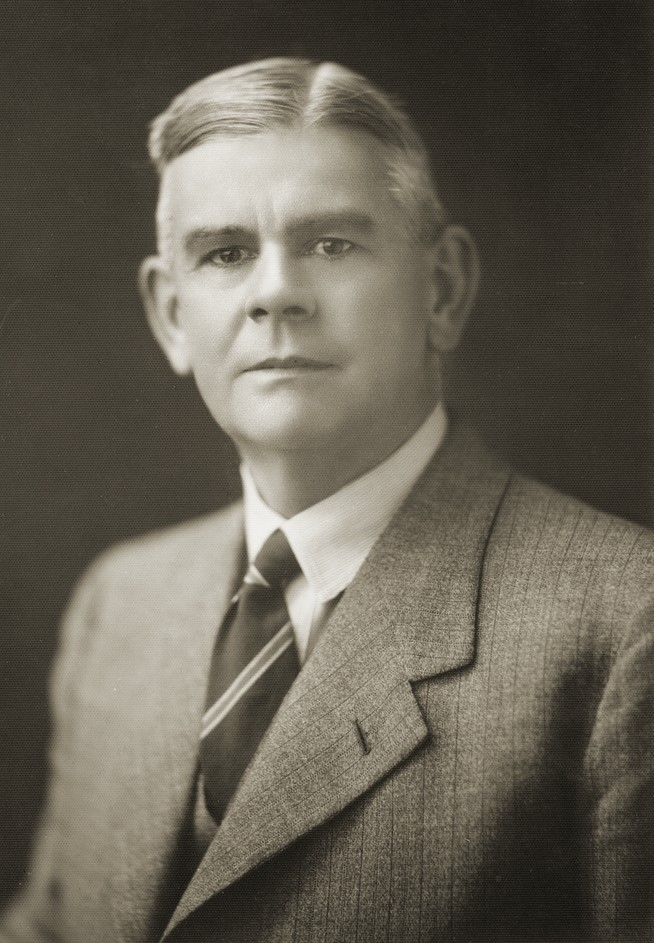

President of the Legislative Council of South Australia
- In office 20 July 1944 – 3 March 1962
- Preceded by: Sir David Gordon
- Succeeded by: Les Densley

Member of the South Australian Legislative Council
- In office 6 April 1918 – 2 March 1962
- Preceded by: Sir Edward Lucas

Personal details
- Born: Walter Gordon Duncan; 10 March 1885 Watervale, South Australia
- Died: 27 August 1963 (aged 78) Parkside, South Australia
- Party: Liberal and Country League
- Spouse: Bessie Fotheringham (m.1909)

Sir Walter Gordon Duncan (10 March 1885 – 27 August 1963) was a politician in the State of South Australia.

== History ==
Duncan was born in Watervale, South Australia, the second son of John Duncan, a wealthy and influential pastoralist and politician, and his wife Jean, née Grant. He was educated at St Peter's College, where he did not shine academically, but excelled at cricket. He was made Knight Bachelor in 1939.

== Politics ==
He was elected to the South Australian Legislative Council for the Liberal Party by the Midland electorate in March 1918 and was re-elected in 1924, 1930, 1938, 1944, 1950 and 1956, finally retiring in 1962. He was elected President of the South Australian Legislative Council in 1944 and held the position until 1962.

== Other interests ==
He was a longtime member of the Royal Agricultural and Horticultural Society, and its president in 1924 and 1925.

== Family ==
He married Bessie Graham Fotheringham on 20 October 1922; they lived at 56 Park Terrace (now Greenhill Road), Parkside.

His brother, Jack Duncan-Hughes, was a member of both the Australian House of Representatives and Australian Senate.
