= William Walsh Robinson =

Australian politician

William Walsh Robinson (23 June 1888 – 19 April 1972) was a farmer and politician in South Australia.

== History ==
He was born the eldest son of Edwin Robinson (c. 1864 – 31 January 1932) and Mary Ann Robinson (c. 1864 – 1 May 1947), née Horne, of Crystal Brook, later 48 Salisbury Street, Unley.

He was a farmer at Crystal Brook, South Australia and director of South Australian Farmer's Co-operative Union Limited. He was a District Council of Crystal Brook councillor for Napperby Ward from 1924 to 1942 and was the council's chairman from 1929 to 1942. He was appointed J.P. in 1933. He was a charter member of the Crystal Brook Bowling Club in 1923 and Club Chairman 1925 and 1926, and vice-president of the North Western Agricultural Society.

He served in the Legislative Council for the Liberal and Country League from 8 March 1947 to 5 March 1965.

== Family ==
He married Hannah Amelia "Millie" Latta of Bulls Creek, South Australia on 13 March 1922. Their children included:

- son Edwin Latta born 9 June 1923 married Brenda Millard Jones
- daughter Ruth born 11 December 1924 married Henry Stewart
- younger son William Thomas married Alison May Read around 1955.

Around 1950 they moved to 17 Holden Street, Kensington Park.
