= Harry Edmonds =

Australian farmer and politician

Ernest Harry Edmonds (28 August 1883 – 8 April 1962), always referred to as "Harry Edmonds" or E. H. Edmonds, was a politician in South Australia.

== History ==
Harry Edmonds was born at McLean & Barker's Comongin Station, near Quilpie, Queensland, the only son of John Hinton Edmonds (c. 1846 – 23 January 1889) and Mary Louisa Edmonds née Puplett ( – ), and educated at Pulteney Street School.

He was a share-farmer at Cowell then moved to Pygery 1917 where he was a farmer and grazier.

He was appointed J.P. in 1928, and was a councillor in the LeHunte District Council, and its chairman in 1932. He was Chairman of the Central Eyre Peninsula Hospital board in 1937. In 1944 he was elected to a Northern district seat on the Legislative Council for the Liberal and Country League. He retired from farming to Adelaide, living at 12 Allen Avenue, Brooklyn Park, and held the seat in Parliament until February 1962, when he retired. He died in hospital two months later.

== Family ==
He married Mabel Jane Haines (c. 1883 – 12 September 1946) daughter of George Haines (c. 1844 – 23 July 1930) on 13 April 1910. They had one daughter and three sons:

- eldest son John Hinton "Jack" Edmonds (9 February 1911 – 1990) married Ella C. Osborn on 10 March 1934
- Raymond Franklin "Ray" Edmonds (12 April 1916 – 2008)
- Ralph Haines Edmonds (11 Mar 1912 – 1988)
- Gwenyth Cecilia Mabel Edmonds (19 Dec 1918 – 2003) married Reginald J. Moxon (died 2011) on 29 September 1944

He married again, to Ellen "Nell" Baird on 28 March 1950.
