= Hector White =

Australian politician

Hector Burnard White (18 June 1900 – 9 June 1969) was an Australian politician who represented the South Australian House of Assembly seat of Murray from 1953 to 1956 for the Liberal and Country League.

In local politics, he was mayor of the Corporate Town of Murray Bridge from 1951 to 1956.
