= Hughie McAlees =

Australian politician

Edmund Herbert (Hughie) McAlees (29 October 1879 – 20 December 1964) was an Australian politician who represented the South Australian House of Assembly seat of Wallaroo from 1950 to 1956 for the Labor Party.
