= Les Densley =

Australian farmer and politician

Leslie Harold Densley (14 September 1894 – 14 November 1974) was a farmer and politician in South Australia.

== History ==
He was born the third son of Alfred Milner Densley and Emily Densley of Torrens Road, Woodville. He was educated at Woodville Public School, later farmed near Keith.

He was a longtime member of the Tatiara District Council and of the Keith Agricultural Bureau.

He was elected as a Liberal candidate to the Legislative Council for the Southern District in April 1944 and held it until 1967. In 1953 he was elected one of the Government appointees to the University of Adelaide council. He served as President of the South Australian Legislative Council from 1962. He retired in June 1967; Victor George Springett won the resulting by-election.

== Family ==
He married Susan Grace Wilson of Ardrossan on 22 May 1918 and lived at Keith. They had one son, Harold Milner Densley, who married Margaret Jean Harris on 28 February 1942.

His brother, Alfred Ingledew Densley was born ca.1889 in Talbot, Victoria, moved to Adelaide in infancy, educated at Rose Park and Port Adelaide, farmed at Warrego (Note: There being no Warrego in South Australia, this must refer to the Warrego River region of Queensland.) and Keith. Alfred Densley fought in France in World War I, and was awarded the MM in 1918.
