= Electoral district of Prospect (South Australia) =

Former South Australian state electoral district

Coordinates: 34°53′S 138°36′E

Prospect South Australia—House of Assembly
- State: South Australia
- Created: 1938
- Abolished: 1956
- Namesake: Prospect, South Australia
- Demographic: Metropolitan

Prospect was an electoral district of the House of Assembly in the Australian state of South Australia from 1938 to 1956.

The seat of Prospect was abolished and replaced by the new seat of Enfield for the 1956 election.

The current Prospect booths are marginal Labor, with the suburb represented by the marginal Liberal seat of Adelaide up to Regency Road, with the small northern remainder of Prospect represented by the fairly safe Labor seat of Enfield.

== Members ==
Member	Party	Term
Elder Whittle	Liberal and Country	1938–1944
Bert Shard	Labor	1944–1947
Elder Whittle	Liberal and Country	1947–1953
Jack Jennings	Labor	1953–1956
