= Herbert Michael =

Australian politician

Herbert Donovan Michael (13 August 1890 – 27 April 1956) was an Australian politician who represented the South Australian House of Assembly seat of Light from 1939 to 1941 and 1944 to 1956 for the Liberal and Country League.

He was previously the chairman of the District Council of Eudunda from 1933 to 1941.

Michael attended Kyre College, the predecessor to Scotch College, Adelaide.

Civic offices
Preceded by Hermann Oskar Leditschke	Chairman of the District Council of Eudunda; 1933–1941	Succeeded by George Hambour
Parliament of South Australia
Preceded by Richard Layton Butler	Member for Light; 1939–1941	Succeeded by Sydney McHugh
Preceded by Sydney McHugh	Member for Light; 1944–1956	Succeeded by George Hambour
