= Jack Jennings (politician) =

Australian politician

John Joseph (Jack) Jennings (6 December 1923 – 28 March 1995) was an Australian politician who represented the South Australian House of Assembly seats of Prospect from 1953 to 1956, Enfield from 1956 to 1970, and Ross Smith from 1970 to 1977 for the Labor Party.

Prior to entering politics, he was a clerk in the accountancy department of an Adelaide stock firm. He was secretary of the Prospect Labor committee and was the youngest member of the party's state executive. He was also the returning officer and a branch council member of the Federated Clerks' Union. He struggled with ill health during his parliamentary career, which was touted as a reason he never made Cabinet despite being a brilliant speaker who was once considered a potential leader. He was Government Whip, served on the Public Works Committee for nineteen years and was a member of the Joint Committee on Subordinate Legislation.
