= John Fletcher (South Australian politician) =

Australian politician

John Fletcher (9 December 1883 – 5 June 1958) was an Australian politician who represented the South Australian House of Assembly seat of Mount Gambier from 1938 to 1958 as an independent.

He was one of 14 of 39 lower house MPs at the 1938 election to be elected as an independent, which as a grouping won 40 percent of the primary vote, more than either of the major parties. Tom Stott was the de facto leader of the independent caucus within parliament. At the time of his death in office in 1958, it was reported that he had supported the incumbent Tom Playford Liberal and Country League government, which held office with a narrow majority.
