= Mick O'Halloran =

Australian politician (1893–1960)

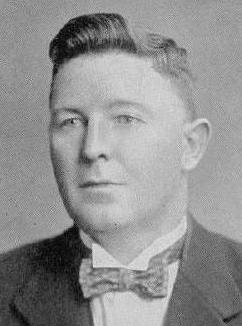

Leader of the Opposition in South Australia
- In office 27 October 1949 – 22 September 1960
- Preceded by: Robert Richards
- Succeeded by: Frank Walsh

Leader of the South Australian Labor Party
- In office 27 October 1949 – 22 September 1960
- Deputy: Frank Walsh
- Preceded by: Robert Richards
- Succeeded by: Frank Walsh

Deputy Leader of the South Australian Labor Party
- In office 4 September 1946 – 27 October 1949
- Leader: Robert Richards
- Preceded by: Andrew Lacey
- Succeeded by: Frank Walsh

Member of the South Australian Parliament for Frome
- In office 19 March 1938 – 22 September 1960
- Preceded by: New district
- Succeeded by: Tom Casey

Senator for South Australia
- In office 17 November 1928 – 30 June 1935

Member of the South Australian Parliament for Burra Burra
- In office 5 April 1924 – 26 March 1927
- Preceded by: Samuel Dickson
- Succeeded by: Francis Jettner
- In office 6 April 1918 – 9 April 1921
- Preceded by: John Pick
- Succeeded by: Samuel Dickson

Personal details
- Born: 12 April 1893 Yanyarrie, South Australia
- Died: 22 September 1960 (aged 67) Adelaide
- Party: Australian Labor Party (SA)

Mick O'Halloran (seated centre)

Michael Raphael O'Halloran (12 April 1893 – 22 September 1960) was an Australian politician, representing the South Australian Branch of the Australian Labor Party. He served as Leader of the Opposition in the Parliament of South Australia and also in the Australian Senate.

== Early life ==
Born in Yanyarrie in outback South Australia, the Irish Catholic O'Halloran was educated at public schools before leaving to work on his parents' farm aged 13.

== Politics ==
O'Halloran joined the ALP at 15 and was first elected to the South Australian House of Assembly Electoral district of Burra Burra at the 1918 election. He lost the seat at the 1921 election, but regained it at the 1924 election. He also made an astute move in 1924 by marrying Mary Frances Rowe on 14 August 1924. They had no children, but Mary would act as O'Halloran's electorate officer and advisor for the remainder of his political life.

Following his defeat at the 1927 election, O'Halloran worked as an organiser for the Labor Party until his election to the Senate at the 1928 federal election. He served as the Deputy Opposition Leader in the Senate from 1932 until his defeat at the 1934 federal election.

After a failed bid to re-enter the Senate at the 1937 federal election, O'Halloran returned to state parliament at the 1938 election, as the member for Frome, based around the area north of Port Pirie. An eccentric, O'Halloran forbade any Labor people to enter Frome, let alone campaign there, and it became known as his personal fiefdom. Despite this, or possibly because of this, O'Halloran comfortably retained Frome for the rest of his life, and succeeded Robert Richards as Leader of the Opposition on 17 October 1949. In the process he became the first Catholic to lead the South Australian Labor Party.

During his eleven years as ALP leader, O'Halloran lost four consecutive elections to the Sir Thomas Playford IV led Liberal and Country League. The ALP won the primary vote in each of these elections, and actually won a majority of the two-party vote at the 1953 election. However, it was locked out of power due to a malapportioned electoral system known as the Playmander. While Adelaide was (with few exceptions) an ALP stronghold, under the Playmander there were two rural electorates for one electorate in Adelaide.

The 1953 election illustrated how grossly distorted the Playmander had become by this time. Labor won 53 percent of the two-party vote to the LCL's 47 percent. In other parts of Australia with fairer electoral systems, this would have been enough to make O'Halloran Premier with a solid majority. However, due to the rural weighting, this only netted Labor a two-seat swing. The LCL won 21 seats to Labor's 14, just barely enough for the LCL to govern alone.

Nevertheless, O'Halloran's leadership of the party remained unchallenged during this time. O'Halloran used his influence within the ALP to support H.V. Evatt as federal ALP leader. Notwithstanding his own Catholicism, he resisted overtures to join the Catholic-dominated Democratic Labor Party, ensuring that the South Australian branch of the ALP remained free from the splits that occurred in Victoria and Queensland.

O'Halloran had a very good working relationship with Playford, which would be unthinkable in today's climate of adversarial politics. Sharp philosophical differences (Playford was a liberal conservative, O'Halloran was a trade-union socialist) did not prevent the two men from being friends. They dined together each week to discuss Playford's future plans for South Australia. In response, Playford would regularly, and publicly, call attention to the important role O'Halloran played in the running of the state, while O'Halloran once described Playford as "the best Labor Premier South Australia ever had".

For this continued rapport, both men had good reasons. Many of Playford's policies were socialistic by the standards of the time (such as the development of government-owned electricity boards) and as such were anathema to his conservative colleagues, especially in the Legislative Council. Even at the height of Playford's power and even with the assistance of the massive rural weighting of the Playmander, the LCL frequently scraped into office. It never held more than 23 seats during Playford's tenure, three more than needed to govern alone. With such a narrow margin, Playford often required Labor support to get many of these policies past his own party's right wing. O'Halloran, meanwhile, realised that with the Playmander in place, Labor had little chance of winning office in its own right. Maintaining cordial dealings with Playford was thus the ideal way to ensure that ALP-friendly legislation was passed.

This partnership meant that O'Halloran was portrayed in the media as Playford's amenable offsider, even though many thought he was a better speaker than Playford. For most of the 1950s, the public believed the key to South Australia's ongoing economic success was the status quo of Playford as Premier and O'Halloran as opposition leader. This may not have concerned O'Halloran a great deal, however. Indeed, he appeared to be content to remain as Opposition Leader; he once told an acquaintance, "I wouldn't want to be Premier even if I could be. Tom Playford can do more for my voters than I could if I were in his shoes." Indeed, following the 1959 election, a cartoon highlighting O'Halloran's relief at losing yet another election was published and O'Halloran liked it so much he framed and hung it in his Parliament House Office.

Knowing that the Playmander made a conventional statewide campaign impossible, O'Halloran focused Labor's efforts on individual seats. While O'Halloran had despaired of ever becoming Premier, this strategy allowed Labor to whittle away at the LCL's hold on power. Under O'Halloran, Labor took seats off the LCL at every election from 1953 onward. It was enough for Labor to go from a ten-seat deficit when O'Halloran took the leadership to only a four-seat deficit at his death.

O'Halloran's de facto alliance with Playford also proved beneficial to him personally. For example, O'Halloran had eagerly sought to obtain a papal audience for many years, but had been informed that only Heads of State could be given such an audience. When he sadly mentioned this fact to Playford, the latter (who, as a Baptist, had no great interest in meeting the Pope) made arrangements to visit Pius XII while in Europe to attend Queen Elizabeth II's coronation. Playford took the O'Hallorans to the Vatican with him.

O'Halloran's fondness for whiskey was renowned within state politics. He would regularly over-indulge during parliamentary sessions, and Playford would thoughtfully adjourn the House early so as not to embarrass him. Similarly, Don Dunstan recalled an incident during the 1953 election campaign when O'Halloran arrived at a public meeting intoxicated, and had to be led away quietly before he fell over.

Despite these weaknesses, O'Halloran was universally liked. Labor's most effective orator prior to Dunstan's entry into politics, O'Halloran was a "decent, heavily built but gentle man who ... wore an air of sleepy benevolence", smoked a pipe and spoke with an Irish brogue.

== Death ==
O'Halloran was still Opposition Leader when he died suddenly of a pulmonary embolism in Adelaide. Upon hearing the news of O'Halloran's death, the normally imperturbable Playford publicly wept. The Premier served as one of the pallbearers at O'Halloran's state funeral (the first state funeral for an opposition leader in South Australian history). In his eulogy on that occasion, Playford said that he had greatly respected O'Halloran as a man who always told the truth.

O'Halloran's longtime deputy, Frank Walsh, succeeded him as opposition leader; five years later, Walsh led SA Labor to victory for the first time in 32 years. O'Halloran is, to date, the most recent leader of the Labor Party in South Australia to have never served as Premier.

Political offices
Preceded by Robert Richards	Leader of the Opposition of South Australia; 1949–1960	Succeeded by Frank Walsh
Parliament of South Australia
Preceded by Laurence O'Loughlin; William Miller; John Pick	Member for Burra Burra; 1918–1921; Served alongside: Buxton, Jenkins	Succeeded by Samuel Dickson; Thomas Hawke
Preceded by Samuel Dickson; Thomas Hawke; George Jenkins	Member for Burra Burra; 1924–1927; Served alongside: A. Hawke, McHugh	Succeeded by Reginald Carter; George Jenkins; Francis Jettner
New district	Member for Frome; 1938–1960	Succeeded by Tom Casey
Party political offices
Preceded by Robert Richards	Leader of the Australian Labor Party (South Australian Branch); 1949 – 1960	Succeeded by Frank Walsh
