= Harold Tapping =

Australian politician

Harold Leslie Tapping (14 May 1901 – 6 September 1964) was an Australian politician who represented the South Australian House of Assembly seat of Semaphore from 1946 to 1964 for the Labor Party.
