= James Stephens (Australian politician) =

Australian politician (1881–1962)

James Ernest Stephens
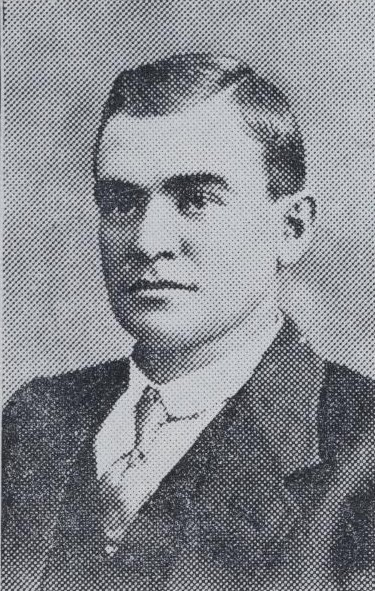
- Born: 25 November 1881; Yatala, South Australia
- Died: 22 June 1962 (aged 80); Woodville, South Australia
- Occupation: Politician
- Known for: Represented the South Australian House of Assembly seat of Port Adelaide

James Ernest Stephens (25 November 1881 – 22 June 1962) was an Australian politician who represented the South Australian House of Assembly seat of Port Adelaide from 1933 to 1959 for the Labor Party.

James was the 3rd of 5 children born to William John Stephens and Frances Myall.

James married Nellie Baverstock on 29 March 1902. They had 8 children.

Founder of the Port Adelaide Co-operative Bakery Society.

Article - Messenger (Port Adelaide, SA : 1951 - 1954)Thursday 16 April 1953 - Page 6

James Ernest Stephens lives at 135 Long Street, Queenstown, and has represented Port Adelaide in the State Parliament continuously since 1933. In 1933 there were nine candidates for the two seats in Port Adelaide. Two members were elected for the district in those days and J. E. was elected with Mr. A.V. Thompson (now Federal member for P.A.) with a majority of 2506. At the last State election in 1950 Mr. Stephens was elected with a 17,906 majority over his only opponent (a Communist Party candidate). He was born in Duke Street, Alberton, only half a mile from where he now lives, and except for one or two short spells when he was working in the country has lived all his life in the district. Jim went to the Port and Glanville schools and his first job was selling newspapers in Port Adelaide. His father died when he was very young and he had to start work early in life to help support the family. He later worked around the Port and in the country wherever work was to be found. For a while he worked on the wharf and later drove a horse trolly till he was elected permanent secretary of the Drivers Union (now known as the Transport Workers' Union). He continued as secretary of the Union till he was elected to the State Parliament in 1933. Mr. Stephens has five sons and four daughters, his wife died some years ago and he has since married again. Mr. Stephens mother was one of the best known people in Port Adelaide as Nurse Stephens, and in her capacity as a nurse brought many hundreds of Port children into the world. The Port electorate which he represents is bounded by the south side of the Port River, Old Port Road, Port RosM, Torrens Road, North Road and Rosewater and has over 30,000 on the rolls, the largest in this State. Said Mr. Stephens: "I represent more people than all the Ministers sitting on the opposite side of me in the House. It is up to the whole of the people, irrespective of their political views, to alter this iniquitous system of election. The Labor Party believes in one vote for one person and each vote of equal value, that is democracy." Mr. Stephens said the greatest trouble today was housing. Quoting from a Housing Trust pamphlet he read, "2262 emergency dwellings had been built but very few more would be built." Mr. Stephens said 100 more emergency dwellings are urgently needed in this district. He went on to say that "the Trust's scheme to build flats for people without children was a disgrace. People with children were being victimised. Mr. Stephens has always been interested in horses, and has been a member of the committee of the S.A. Trotting Club for many years.
