= Malcolm McIntosh (politician) =

Australian politician

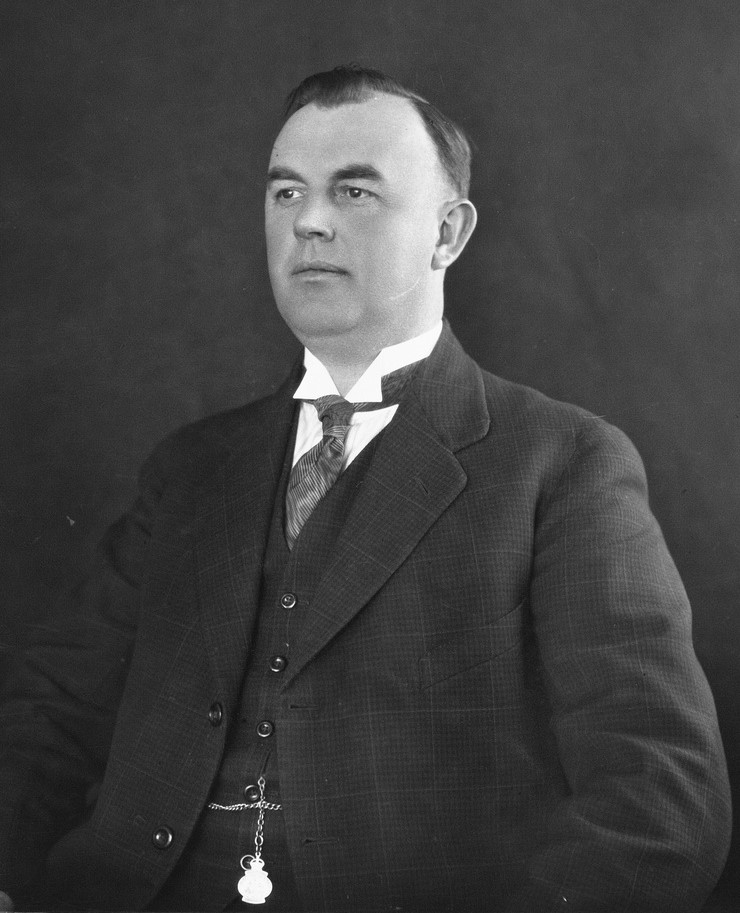

Sir Malcolm McIntosh KBE (3 March 1888 – 15 November 1960) was an Australian politician who represented the South Australian House of Assembly seat of Albert from 1921 to 1959. He represented three different parties: the Country Party (1921-1928), the Liberal Federation (1928-1932) and the merged Liberal and Country League (1932-1959).

He was Minister for Railways for most of the period 1938–1953.

In 1956 he was appointed a Knight Commander of the Order of the British Empire (KBE).

Political offices
Preceded by John McInnes	Commissioner of Public Works; 1927–1930	Succeeded by John McInnes
Preceded by Lionel Hill	Minister of Education; 1927–1930	Succeeded by Lionel Hill
Preceded by Robert Richards	Commissioner of Crown Lands; 1933–1938	Succeeded by Thomas Playford IV
Preceded by Robert Richards	Minister of Irrigation; 1933–1938	Succeeded by Thomas Playford IV
Preceded by Robert Richards	Minister of Repatriation; 1933–1938	Succeeded by Thomas Playford IV
Preceded by George Ritchie	Minister of Afforestation; 1935–1938	Succeeded by Percy Blesing
Preceded by Herbert Hudd	Commissioner of Public Works; 1938–1944	Name changed to Minister of Works
Preceded by Percy Blesing	Minister of Local Government; 1938–1953	Succeeded by Norman Jude
Preceded by Herbert Hudd	Minister of Railways; 1938–1953	Succeeded by Norman Jude
Preceded by Herbert Hudd	Minister of Marine; 1938–1958	Succeeded by Colin Rowe
Name changed from Commissioner of Public Works	Minister for Works; 1944–1958	Succeeded by Colin Rowe
Parliament of South Australia
Preceded by William Angus; Richard Alfred O'Connor	Member for Albert; 1921–1959; Served alongside: Frederick McMillan, Tom Stott	Succeeded by Bill Nankivell
