= Colin Dunnage =

Australian politician

Colin Rosslyn Dunnage (10 October 1896 – 7 November 1969) was an Australian politician who represented the South Australian House of Assembly seat of Unley from 1941 to 1962 for the Liberal and Country League.

Parliament of South Australia
Preceded by John McLeay, senior	Member for Unley; 1941–1962	Succeeded by Gil Langley
