= Electoral district of Angas =

Former South Australian state electoral district

Coordinates: 34°30′05″S 139°02′47″E

Angas South Australia—House of Assembly
- State: South Australia
- Created: 1938
- Abolished: 1970
- Demographic: Rural

Angas was an electoral district of the House of Assembly in the Australian state of South Australia from 1938 to 1970 and which was associated with the town of Angaston.

== Members ==
Member	Party	Term
Reginald Rudall	Liberal and Country	1938–1944
Berthold Teusner	Liberal and Country	1944–1970
