= Electoral district of Rocky River =

Former electoral district in South Australia

Coordinates: 33°21′S 138°12′E

Rocky River South Australia—House of Assembly
- State: South Australia
- Created: 1938
- Abolished: 1985
- Demographic: Rural

Rocky River was an electoral district of the House of Assembly in the Australian state of South Australia from March 1938 to December 1985.

The electorate was based in the Mid North region, around the towns of Crystal Brook, Gladstone and Port Germein. In 1938, the polling places were Beetaloo Valley, Crystal Brook, Napperby, Hundred of Pirie, Wandearah, Warnertown, Appila, Bundaleer Spring, Caltowie, Georgetown, Gladstone, Gulnare, Laura, Narridy, Stone Hut, Tarcowie, Wirrabara, Yandiah, Baroota, Port Germein, Telowie.

John Olsen moved from the abolished Rocky River to Custance at the 1985 election.

== Members ==
Member	Party	Term
John Lyons	Liberal and Country	1938–1948
James Heaslip	Liberal and Country	1949–1968
Howard Venning	Liberal and Country	1968–1974
Howard Venning	Liberal	1974–1979
John Olsen	Liberal	1979–1985
