= Electoral district of Ridley =

Former South Australian electoral district

Ridley South Australia—House of Assembly
- State: South Australia
- Dates current: 1938–1970, 1993–1997
- Namesake: John Ridley
- Demographic: Rural

The Electoral district of Ridley was an electoral district of the South Australian House of Assembly, existing between 1938 and 1970 and between 1993 and 1997.

Named after John Ridley, the inventor of a successful threshing machine, Ridley was a rural electorate located in the riverland area of South Australia, stretching along the southern bank of the Murray River from Morgan to the New South Wales border. Ridley also contained the towns of Waikerie, Lyrup and Loxton.

Created for the 1938 South Australian election, following the change from multi-member to single-member electorates, Ridley was held by Tom Stott for its entire existence. Stott was the longest serving independent in Australian political history.

Ridley was abolished at the 1970 election.

Ridley was recreated as an electoral district in a 1991 redistribution for the 1993 election. In this incarnation, Ridley was 24,797 km² and contained the towns of Coonalpyn, Karoonda, Murray Bridge, Lameroo, Pinnaroo, Tailem Bend and Tintinara. It was a safe Liberal seat, existing until 1997, when it was renamed Hammond.

== Members ==
First incarnation (1938–1970)
| Member | Party | Term |
|---|---|---|
| Tom Stott | Independent | 1938–1970 |
Second incarnation (1993–1997)
| Member | Party | Term |
| Peter Lewis | Liberal | 1993–1997 |
