= Electoral district of Semaphore =

Former South Australian electoral district

Coordinates: 34°50′20″S 138°29′02″E

Semaphore South Australia—House of Assembly
- State: South Australia
- Created: 1938
- Abolished: 1993
- Namesake: Semaphore, South Australia
- Demographic: Metropolitan

Semaphore was an electoral district of the House of Assembly in the Australian state of South Australia from 1938 to 1993.

Semaphore was abolished in a boundary redistribution in 1993 and became the new seat of Hart.

The suburb of Semaphore is currently located in the marginal Labor seat of Lee.

== Members ==
| Member | Party | Term |
|---|---|---|
| Albert Thompson | Labor | 1938–1946 |
| Harold Tapping | Labor | 1946–1964 |
| Reg Hurst | Labor | 1964–1973 |
| Jack Olson | Labor | 1973–1979 |
| Norm Peterson | Independent | 1979–1993 |
