= Tom Stott =

Australian politician

Tom Cleave Stott CBE (6 June 1899 – 21 October 1976) spent 37 years as an independent member of the South Australian House of Assembly, from 1933 to 1970. He served as Speaker of the House from 1962 to 1965 for the Tom Playford LCL government and 1968 to 1970 for the Steele Hall LCL government, both times in exchange for his confidence and supply vote to form minority governments.

Tom Stott (far right) at a "Press v Parliament" cricket match, 1947

== Early life ==
Born in Norwood, South Australia, Stott completed primary school and began working for his father on their 2225 hectare wheat farm near Mindarie, in the Murray Mallee region of South Australia, while continuing his education through Workers Educational Association of South Australia (WEA) classes and extensive reading.

== Political career ==
Stott showed great interest in the problems facing his fellow wheat farmers and joined the newly formed Country Party in 1920. As President of his local branch, Stott began to raise his profile around the electorate and in farming circles, helping to found the Farmers Protection Association in 1929, the South Australian Wheatgrowers Protection Association (SAWPA) in 1930 and the Australian Wheatgrowers Federation (AWF) in 1931. He was also appointed General Secretary of each of these organisations.

Stott was considering seeking Country Party preselection for his local Electoral district of Albert at the 1933 election when it was announced that the Country Party would merge with the urban based Liberal Federation to form the Liberal and Country League (LCL). He opposed the move, fearing both that the rural prerogative of the Country Party would be diminished and that his preselection may become more difficult. His fears were partly realised when he lost LCL pre-selection; Stott promptly resigned from the party to run as an independent.

Stott was given little chance of winning. However, his standing within the influential wheat farming community in Albert, his Masonic connections, and his vocal opposition to the Country Party/Liberal Federation merger led to his election. He soon proved to be a thorn in the side of the newly elected LCL government of Richard Layton Butler, being dubbed the "Farmer's Champion" due to his vocal support of Great Depression affected farmers. Given that the state's ALP remained ineffective and torn by internecine feuding after Lionel Hill's unpopular premiership, Stott was considered by the LCL to be "a greater nuisance than the whole of the Opposition put together".

Upon his election in 1933, Stott was forced to resign from his Secretariat position with SAWPA; but he retained his role with the AWF. He also helped found the Primary Producers Council of Australia (the antecedent of the National Farmers' Federation) in 1934 and continued to play a leading role within that organisation. This influence within these important primary industry bodies allowed Stott to build a power base for himself that assisted with his continued re-election over the next three decades.

In addition to his parliamentary work on rural issues, such as successfully introducing legislation to secure a (high) stable price for wheat and to enable bulk handling of grain, Stott also proved himself to be adept at championing prickly social issues, including introducing a successful Private Member's Bill to reduce the period a divorce could be granted in the case of desertion from five to three years. This success led the government to approach Stott to introduce other controversial social issue legislation that the LCL supported but did not want to introduce. The public recognised this, and many people who approached Stott for assistance were not in his electorate.

Stott was comfortably re-elected at the 1938 South Australian election in the newly formed Electoral district of Ridley (following the division of Albert into two single electoral districts). He was one of 14 independents in the chamber. The independents as a grouping won 40 percent of the primary vote, more than either of the major parties. Stott was the de facto leader of the independent caucus within parliament. The incumbent LCL government only held 15 of 39 seats, which led to uncertainty over which party, if any, could form government. This confusion led Stott, as the most experienced and famous of the Independent MPs, to believe that he could become Premier of South Australia himself. He failed to gain the support of sufficient independents and LCL members to achieve this; but the LCL government was forced to rely on his support far more than its members would have liked.

The commencement of World War II led Stott to argue that the forthcoming 1941 election should be cancelled and an LCL/ALP/Independent coalition government instigated (perhaps with himself in a prominent position) to concentrate on fighting the war. He failed to gain support for this plan, and the election went ahead, with Stott easily retaining his seat. So great a reputation did he have as the friend of primary industry, that he was sometimes called the "Christ of the Mallee" where, it was written, "few would have glanced if he had walked on water".

Following the 1941 election, Premier Tom Playford approached Stott and recommended that the latter join the LCL. While Stott refused to do so, he remained a fervent admirer of Playford, and publicly praised the Premier wherever possible. In return, Playford sought to persuade the local LCL branch to refrain from running a candidate of its own against Stott in his constituency for successive elections. When the local LCL branch finally refused Playford's request, he apologised profusely to Stott and did little to support the candidate of his own party.

Stott's continued electoral success cannot purely be credited to his influence within bodies like the AWF. For years he was also heavily involved with the wine and citrus industries and helped get producers in both industries significant government concessions. He was renowned for his in-depth knowledge of any issue he debated, which he achieved through prodigious research. His wife Linda, whom he married in 1926, was also a shrewd political campaigner who was heavily involved in issues around the electorate and proved a great asset for Stott. Perhaps however, his greatest asset was his reputation as a tireless campaigner who never gave up on a constituent issue; in one case Stott spent over twenty years arguing with government departments on behalf of constituents seeking to be connected to the water supply before his eventual success. Taking into account his public persona as a man with a square jaw, resonant voice and great presence who drank, smoked and owned and wagered on horses (Stott would serve as President of the South Australian Racehorse Owners' Association), and who was not afraid of condemnation by the churches for this lifestyle, Stott retained statewide popularity throughout his tenure in parliament.

The 1962 election resulted in a hung parliament whereby the LCL and Labor each held 19 seats. By this time, Stott was the only independent in the chamber, and he was now in a position where he could effectively choose the next Premier. The leading ALP figures were initially hopeful of convincing Stott to support them in government (which would have made Frank Walsh the new Premier), but Playford praised Stott for his long service to South Australia. Stott threw his support to Playford, referring to him as the greatest Premier in history. Labor resigned itself to another three years in opposition. In return for his support, Playford named Stott the Speaker of the House, ensuring that Stott had the casting vote on any contentious legislation — a vote that he used almost without fail to support the LCL.

Stott lost the speakership following the 1965 election, which the ALP won. Nevertheless he regained it (and the balance of power) in 1968 when the LCL, under Steele Hall, returned to power. The government, being reliant on Stott's support, always welcomed his suggestions and when Stott recommended the construction of a dam at Chowilla (within his electorate), the LCL initially readily agreed. However, Hall believed the proposed dam would be an expensive white elephant and refused to fund the dam. Protests in Ridley forced Stott to vote with the Opposition to defeat Hall's government, leading to the return of Don Dunstan as Premier, something that Stott had fervently worked against for the previous decade.

== Later life ==
Following his retirement at the 1970 election Stott lent his expertise to the Country Party as an organiser and campaign director and died in 1976, still angry with Steele Hall over Chowilla Dam.

The Stott Highway was named in 2008 in his honour as it passes through his former electoral districts and near his farm.

Parliament of South Australia
Preceded by Frederick McMillan	Member for Albert; 1933–1938; Served alongside: Malcolm McIntosh	Succeeded by Malcolm McIntosh
New district	Member for Ridley; 1938–1970	District abolished
Preceded by Berthold Teusner	Speaker of the South Australian House of Assembly; 1962–1965	Succeeded by Lindsay Riches
Preceded by Lindsay Riches	Speaker of the South Australian House of Assembly; 1968–1970	Succeeded by Reg Hurst
Preceded by Himself, Tom Playford, Howard Shannon	Father of the Parliament of South Australia; 1968–1970	Succeeded by Lyell McEwin
