= Howard Shannon =

Australian politician

Howard Shannon CMG

Member of the South Australian House of Assembly

Member of Parliament for Electoral district of Onkaparinga
- In office 19 March 1938 – 1 March 1968

Member of Parliament for Electoral district of Murray
- In office 8 April 1933 – 18 March 1938

Personal details
- Born: 29 March 1892 South Australia
- Died: 15 August 1976, aged 84 South Australia
- Relations: David Shannon (great uncle); David Moody (great uncle); James Shannon (great uncle); John Wallace Shannon (father)
- Children: David Shannon
- Relations

Howard Huntley Shannon, CMG, (29 March 1892 – 15 August 1976) served as a member of the South Australian House of Assembly for the Electoral district of Murray from 8 April 1933 to 18 March 1938 and for the Electoral district of Onkaparinga from 19 March 1938 to 1 March 1968. In 1960, Shannon was made a Companion of the Order of St Michael and St George for his service as a member of the House of Assembly.
