= Results of the 1968 South Australian state election (House of Assembly) =

1968 South Australian state election results

South Australian state election, 2 March 1968 House of Assembly << 1965–1970 >>
Enrolled voters	609,627				
Votes cast	575,949		Turnout	94.48%	–0.11%
Informal votes	13,291		Informal	2.31%	–0.50%
Summary of votes by party
Party	Primary votes	%	Swing	Seats	Change
Labor	292,445	51.98%	–3.06%	19	2
Liberal and Country	246,560	43.82%	+7.89%	19	+ 2
Democratic Labor	9,223	1.64%	–2.71%	0	± 0
Social Credit	4,792	0.85%	–1.07%	0	± 0
National	2,251	0.40%	–0.05%	0	± 0
Communist	1,606	0.29%	–0.15%	0	± 0
Independent	5,781	1.03%	–0.85%	1	± 0
Total	562,658			39	
Two-party-preferred
Liberal and Country		46.80%	+1.10%		
Labor		53.20%	–1.10%		

This is a list of House of Assembly results for the 1968 South Australian state election.

== Results by electoral district ==
=== Adelaide ===
1968 South Australian state election: Adelaide
Party	Candidate	Votes	%	±%
Labor	Sam Lawn	8,315	61.3	−11.6
Liberal and Country	Donald Maddocks	4,026	29.7	+29.7
Communist	Elliott Johnston	1,226	9.0	+3.8
Total formal votes		13,567	96.4	+3.5
Informal votes		542	3.8	−3.5
Turnout		14,109	93.7	+1.8
Two-party-preferred result
Labor	Sam Lawn	9,418	69.4	−10.1
Liberal and Country	Donald Maddocks	4,149	30.6	+30.6
Labor hold		Swing	N/A	

=== Albert ===
1968 South Australian state election: Albert
Party	Candidate	Votes	%	±%
Liberal and Country	Bill Nankivell	5,872	76.7	−23.3
Labor	Graham Maguire	1,783	23.3	+23.3
Total formal votes		7,655	98.4	
Informal votes		125	1.7	
Turnout		7,780	95.4	
Liberal and Country hold		Swing	N/A	

=== Alexandra ===
1968 South Australian state election: Alexandra
Party	Candidate	Votes	%	±%
Liberal and Country	David Brookman	6,349	48.7	−9.0
Labor	Robert Harris	5,910	45.3	+3.0
Independent	Betty Bishop	442	3.4	+3.4
National	William Johns	350	2.7	+2.7
Total formal votes		13,051	98.1	0.0
Informal votes		255	1.9	0.0
Turnout		13,306	95.9	+0.1
Two-party-preferred result
Liberal and Country	David Brookman	7,040	53.9	−3.8
Labor	Robert Harris	6,011	46.1	+3.8
Liberal and Country hold		Swing	−3.8	

=== Angas ===
1968 South Australian state election: Angas
Party	Candidate	Votes	%	±%
Liberal and Country	Berthold Teusner	4,351	68.0	−32.0
Labor	Brian Chatterton	2,045	32.0	+32.0
Total formal votes		6,396	97.9	
Informal votes		135	2.1	
Turnout		6,531	96.1	
Liberal and Country hold		Swing	N/A	

=== Barossa ===
1968 South Australian state election: Barossa
Party	Candidate	Votes	%	±%
Labor	Molly Byrne	8,792	52.5	+1.0
Liberal and Country	Roger Goldsworthy	7,608	45.4	−0.8
Democratic Labor	Bernard McRae	216	1.3	+0.4
Independent	Luke Horan	138	0.8	+0.8
Total formal votes		16,754	98.1	−0.5
Informal votes		331	1.9	+0.5
Turnout		17,085	95.1	−0.5
Two-party-preferred result
Labor	Molly Byrne	8,893	53.1	+0.8
Liberal and Country	Roger Goldsworthy	7,861	46.9	−0.8
Labor hold		Swing	+0.8	

=== Burnside ===
1968 South Australian state election: Burnside
Party	Candidate	Votes	%	±%
Liberal and Country	Joyce Steele	20,609	59.4	−0.2
Labor	Joyce Henriott	14,059	40.6	+5.4
Total formal votes		34,668	97.2	−0.2
Informal votes		980	2.8	+0.2
Turnout		35,648	95.2	+1.0
Liberal and Country hold		Swing	−2.8	

=== Burra ===
1968 South Australian state election: Burra
Party	Candidate	Votes	%	±%
Liberal and Country	Ernest Allen	3,131	56.9	−5.4
Labor	John Phelan	1,767	32.1	−5.6
Democratic Labor	William Ahern	602	11.0	+11.0
Total formal votes		5,500	98.7	+0.1
Informal votes		70	1.3	−0.1
Turnout		5,570	96.4	+0.5
Two-party-preferred result
Liberal and Country	Ernest Allen	3,643	66.2	+3.9
Labor	John Phelan	1,857	33.8	−3.9
Liberal and Country hold		Swing	+3.9	

=== Chaffey ===
1968 South Australian state election: Chaffey
Party	Candidate	Votes	%	±%
Liberal and Country	Peter Arnold	3,392	47.4	+0.1
Labor	Reg Curren	3,073	42.9	−5.7
National	James Trevor	367	5.1	+5.1
Independent	Allan Anderson	329	4.6	+4.6
Total formal votes		7,161	97.3	−0.1
Informal votes		197	2.7	+0.1
Turnout		7,358	93.4	−2.5
Two-party-preferred result
Liberal and Country	Peter Arnold	4,008	56.0	+6.7
Labor	Reg Curren	3,153	44.0	−6.7
Liberal and Country gain from Labor		Swing	+6.7	

=== Edwardstown ===
1968 South Australian state election: Edwardstown
Party	Candidate	Votes	%	±%
Labor	Geoff Virgo	18,055	57.5	−2.9
Liberal and Country	David Rogers	11,399	36.3	+4.0
Independent	Helen Anderson	1,948	6.2	+6.2
Total formal votes		31,402	98.0	0.0
Informal votes		645	2.0	0.0
Turnout		32,047	93.9	−1.0
Two-party-preferred result
Labor	Geoff Virgo	18,347	58.4	−3.4
Liberal and Country	David Rogers	13,055	41.6	+3.4
Labor hold		Swing	−3.4	

=== Enfield ===
1968 South Australian state election: Enfield
Party	Candidate	Votes	%	±%
Labor	Jack Jennings	28,246	67.2	+6.0
Liberal and Country	Allan Stock	13,036	31.0	+5.6
Social Credit	Edwin Meier	724	1.7	−6.5
Total formal votes		42,006	97.5	+1.0
Informal votes		1,090	2.5	−1.0
Turnout		43,096	94.7	−0.4
Two-party-preferred result
Labor	Jack Jennings	28,608	68.1	+1.1
Liberal and Country	Allan Stock	13,398	31.9	−1.1
Labor hold		Swing	+1.1	

=== Eyre ===
1968 South Australian state election: Eyre
Party	Candidate	Votes	%	±%
Liberal and Country	Ernie Edwards	3,292	45.4	−1.4
Independent	William Wilkins	1,883	26.0	+26.0
Labor	Jack Mortimer	1,306	18.0	−8.9
National	Morley Rodda	775	10.7	−15.7
Total formal votes		7,256	98.8	+0.4
Informal votes		89	1.2	−0.4
Turnout		7,345	96.0	+0.4
Two-candidate-preferred result
Liberal and Country	Ernie Edwards	3,987	54.9	−5.3
Independent	William Wilkins	3,269	45.1	+45.1
Liberal and Country hold		Swing	N/A	

=== Flinders ===
1968 South Australian state election: Flinders
Party	Candidate	Votes	%	±%
Liberal and Country	Glen Pearson	4,285	59.1	+5.5
Labor	Hugh Patterson	2,512	34.7	−4.3
Democratic Labor	Douglas Barnes	451	6.2	−1.2
Total formal votes		7,248	98.1	−0.5
Informal votes		137	1.9	+0.5
Turnout		7,385	95.7	−0.6
Two-party-preferred result
Liberal and Country	Glen Pearson	4,578	63.2	+3.3
Labor	Hugh Patterson	2,670	36.8	−3.3
Liberal and Country hold		Swing	+3.3	

=== Frome ===
1968 South Australian state election: Frome
Party	Candidate	Votes	%	±%
Labor	Tom Casey	2,672	58.8	+0.9
Liberal and Country	Maxwell Hams	1,874	41.2	+2.2
Total formal votes		4,546	98.1	−0.4
Informal votes		88	1.9	+0.4
Turnout		4,634	92.9	+0.5
Labor hold		Swing	+0.5	

=== Gawler ===
1968 South Australian state election: Gawler
Party	Candidate	Votes	%	±%
Labor	John Clark	20,573	65.0	+0.2
Liberal and Country	Stewart Gilchrist	9,720	30.7	+5.3
Social Credit	Frank Lawrence	1,374	4.3	+4.3
Total formal votes		31,667	97.2	−0.3
Informal votes		901	2.8	+0.3
Turnout		32,568	92.7	−1.3
Two-party-preferred result
Labor	John Clark	21,260	67.1	−2.6
Liberal and Country	Stewart Gilchrist	10,407	32.9	+2.6
Labor hold		Swing	−2.6	

=== Glenelg ===
1968 South Australian state election: Glenelg
Party	Candidate	Votes	%	±%
Labor	Hugh Hudson	18,711	53.3	+1.8
Liberal and Country	John McCoy	15,165	43.2	−1.4
Democratic Labor	Mark Posa	1,203	3.4	−0.5
Total formal votes		35,079	98.5	−0.1
Informal votes		536	1.5	+0.1
Turnout		35,615	95.2	+0.2
Two-party-preferred result
Labor	Hugh Hudson	18,891	53.9	+1.8
Liberal and Country	John McCoy	16,188	46.1	−1.8
Labor hold		Swing	+1.8	

=== Gouger ===
1968 South Australian state election: Gouger
Party	Candidate	Votes	%	±%
Liberal and Country	Steele Hall	6,557	56.8	−6.7
Labor	Edward Eaton	4,139	35.9	−0.6
Social Credit	Albert Apponyi	579	5.0	+5.0
Democratic Labor	Peter Meredith	261	2.3	+2.3
Total formal votes		11,536	97.4	0.0
Informal votes		305	2.6	0.0
Turnout		11,841	94.6	−0.8
Two-party-preferred result
Liberal and Country	Steele Hall	7,069	61.3	−2.2
Labor	Edward Eaton	4,467	38.7	+2.2
Liberal and Country hold		Swing	−2.2	

=== Gumeracha ===
1968 South Australian state election: Gumeracha
Party	Candidate	Votes	%	±%
Liberal and Country	Bryant Giles	4,740	67.9	+3.1
Labor	Cyril Swaine	2,245	32.1	+10.6
Total formal votes		6,985	98.4	+0.5
Informal votes		115	1.6	−0.5
Turnout		7,100	91.7	−4.5
Liberal and Country hold		Swing	−5.2	

=== Hindmarsh ===
1968 South Australian state election: Hindmarsh
Party	Candidate	Votes	%	±%
Labor	Cyril Hutchens	14,874	72.2	−7.9
Liberal and Country	Richard Leeton	5,741	27.8	+27.8
Total formal votes		20,615	96.3	+1.6
Informal votes		796	3.7	−1.6
Turnout		21,411	95.1	+0.9
Labor hold		Swing	N/A	

=== Light ===
1968 South Australian state election: Light
Party	Candidate	Votes	%	±%
Liberal and Country	John Freebairn	3,873	68.9	−31.1
Labor	Ernest Fahey	1,749	31.1	+31.1
Total formal votes		5,622	98.2	
Informal votes		99	1.8	
Turnout		5,721	96.3	
Liberal and Country hold		Swing	N/A	

=== Millicent ===
1968 South Australian state election: Millicent
Party	Candidate	Votes	%	±%
Labor	Des Corcoran	3,635	50.0	−11.8
Liberal and Country	Martin Cameron	3,634	50.0	+11.8
Total formal votes		7,269	99.0	+0.2
Informal votes		73	1.0	−0.2
Turnout		7,342	96.0	+1.0
Labor hold		Swing	−11.8	

- This result was declared void by the Court of Disputed Returns and a by-election was held, in which Labor retained the seat.

=== Mitcham ===
1968 South Australian state election: Mitcham
Party	Candidate	Votes	%	±%
Liberal and Country	Robin Millhouse	16,056	64.8	−0.8
Labor	Peter Gilchrist	8,727	35.2	+2.8
Total formal votes		24,783	98.5	+0.3
Informal votes		381	1.5	−1.5
Turnout		25,164	93.0	−0.8
Liberal and Country hold		Swing	−1.8	

=== Mount Gambier ===
1968 South Australian state election: Mount Gambier
Party	Candidate	Votes	%	±%
Labor	Allan Burdon	5,567	58.6	−2.0
Liberal and Country	Archibald Scott	3,926	41.4	+2.0
Total formal votes		9,493	98.0	−0.2
Informal votes		198	2.0	+0.2
Turnout		9,691	95.6	+1.1
Labor hold		Swing	−2.0	

=== Murray ===
1968 South Australian state election: Murray
Party	Candidate	Votes	%	±%
Labor	Gabe Bywaters	4,051	49.0	−18.1
Liberal and Country	Ivon Wardle	4,044	48.9	+16.0
Democratic Labor	Terence Critchley	178	2.1	+2.1
Total formal votes		8,273	98.3	+0.2
Informal votes		142	1.7	−0.2
Turnout		8,415	96.4	+0.1
Two-party-preferred result
Liberal and Country	Ivon Wardle	4,157	50.2	+17.3
Labor	Gabe Bywaters	4,116	49.8	−17.3
Liberal and Country gain from Labor		Swing	+17.3	

=== Norwood ===
1968 South Australian state election: Norwood
Party	Candidate	Votes	%	±%
Labor	Don Dunstan	9,981	56.4	−1.2
Liberal and Country	David Tonkin	7,417	41.9	−0.5
Democratic Labor	Kevin McRae	303	1.7	+1.7
Total formal votes		17,701	97.9	+1.2
Informal votes		388	2.1	−1.2
Turnout		18,089	93.9	+0.5
Two-party-preferred result
Labor	Don Dunstan	10,026	56.6	−1.0
Liberal and Country	David Tonkin	7,675	43.4	+1.0
Labor hold		Swing	−1.0	

=== Onkaparinga ===
1968 South Australian state election: Onkaparinga
Party	Candidate	Votes	%	±%
Liberal and Country	Stan Evans	4,228	57.6	+0.5
Labor	David Rhodes	2,356	32.1	−6.7
National	Robert Harper	759	10.3	+10.3
Total formal votes		7,343	98.1	−0.1
Informal votes		145	1.9	+0.1
Turnout		7,488	95.3	−0.5
Two-party-preferred result
Liberal and Country	Stan Evans	4,911	66.9	+7.8
Labor	David Rhodes	2,432	33.1	−7.8
Liberal and Country hold		Swing	+7.8	

=== Port Adelaide ===
1968 South Australian state election: Port Adelaide
Party	Candidate	Votes	%	±%
Labor	John Ryan	15,460	68.4	−8.4
Liberal and Country	Graeme Sargent	4,811	23.6	+23.6
Social Credit	Denis McEvoy	1,246	6.1	+6.1
Communist	Peter Symon	380	1.9	−2.6
Total formal votes		20,348	96.5	+2.2
Informal votes		740	3.5	−2.2
Turnout		21,088	93.5	−1.2
Two-party-preferred result
Labor	John Ryan	14,876	73.1	−0.9
Liberal and Country	Graeme Sargent	5,472	26.9	+0.9
Labor hold		Swing	−0.9	

=== Port Pirie ===
1968 South Australian state election: Port Pirie
Party	Candidate	Votes	%	±%
Labor	Dave McKee	4,301	69.1	−20.3
Liberal and Country	Graham Hancock	1,378	22.1	+22.1
Independent	Wesley Thomas	547	8.8	+8.8
Total formal votes		6,226	97.8	+1.0
Informal votes		141	2.2	−1.0
Turnout		6,367	95.5	−0.7
Two-party-preferred result
Labor	Dave McKee	4,574	73.5	−0.5
Liberal and Country	Graham Hancock	1,652	26.5	+0.5
Labor hold		Swing	−0.5	

=== Ridley ===
1968 South Australian state election: Ridley
Party	Candidate	Votes	%	±%
Independent	Tom Stott	2,824	40.3	−26.6
Liberal and Country	Geoffrey Blight	2,624	37.4	+37.4
Labor	Francis Bulbeck	1,568	22.3	−10.8
Total formal votes		7,016	98.6	+0.2
Informal votes		99	1.4	−0.2
Turnout		7,115	96.6	−1.4
Two-candidate-preferred result
Independent	Tom Stott	3,901	55.6	−11.3
Liberal and Country	Geoffrey Blight	3,115	44.4	+44.4
Independent hold		Swing	N/A	

=== Rocky River ===
1968 South Australian state election: Rocky River
Party	Candidate	Votes	%	±%
Liberal and Country	Howard Venning	3,671	70.1	+3.5
Labor	Jim Dunford	1,565	29.9	−3.5
Total formal votes		5,236	97.9	−0.4
Informal votes		110	2.1	+0.4
Turnout		5,346	96.4	−0.1
Liberal and Country hold		Swing	+3.5	

=== Semaphore ===
1968 South Australian state election: Semaphore
Party	Candidate	Votes	%	±%
Labor	Reg Hurst	15,613	69.6	−8.5
Liberal and Country	Reginald Appelkamp	6,076	27.1	+27.1
Social Credit	Edward Wright	731	3.3	−5.4
Total formal votes		22,520	97.0	+2.1
Informal votes		692	3.0	−2.1
Turnout		23,112	95.1	−0.4
Two-party-preferred result
Labor	Reg Hurst	15,978	71.3	−0.7
Liberal and Country	Reginald Appelkamp	6,442	28.7	+28.7
Labor hold		Swing	N/A	

=== Stirling ===
1968 South Australian state election: Stirling
Party	Candidate	Votes	%	±%
Liberal and Country	William McAnaney	5,124	72.0	+1.1
Labor	Glenton Gregory	1,989	28.0	−1.1
Total formal votes		7,113	98.3	−0.7
Informal votes		122	1.7	+0.7
Turnout		7,235	96.3	−0.2
Liberal and Country hold		Swing	+1.1	

=== Stuart ===
1968 South Australian state election: Stuart
Party	Candidate	Votes	%	±%
Labor	Lindsay Riches	6,002	73.9	−13.8
Liberal and Country	Robert Semmens	2,124	26.1	+26.1
Total formal votes		8,126	98.0	+2.3
Informal votes		169	2.0	−2.3
Turnout		8,295	93.8	+0.7
Labor hold		Swing	N/A	

=== Torrens ===
1968 South Australian state election: Torrens
Party	Candidate	Votes	%	±%
Liberal and Country	John Coumbe	9,126	52.3	+3.8
Labor	Terry McRae	7,578	42.6	−1.1
Democratic Labor	George Basivovs	1,076	6.1	−0.1
Total formal votes		17,780	97.5	−0.4
Informal votes		462	2.5	+0.4
Turnout		18,242	93.6	−0.6
Two-party-preferred result
Liberal and Country	John Coumbe	10,041	56.5	+2.4
Labor	Terry McRae	7,739	43.5	−2.4
Liberal and Country hold		Swing	+2.4	

=== Unley ===
1968 South Australian state election: Unley
Party	Candidate	Votes	%	±%
Labor	Gil Langley	8,820	50.8	+0.1
Liberal and Country	Lewis Short	7,689	44.3	−0.6
Democratic Labor	Ted Farrell	852	4.9	+1.2
Total formal votes		17,361	97.5	−0.1
Informal votes		450	2.5	+0.1
Turnout		17,811	92.9	−1.1
Two-party-preferred result
Labor	Gil Langley	8,948	51.5	−0.1
Liberal and Country	Lewis Short	8,413	48.5	+0.1
Labor hold		Swing	−0.1	

=== Victoria ===
1968 South Australian state election: Victoria
Party	Candidate	Votes	%	±%
Liberal and Country	Allan Rodda	4,439	62.3	+11.2
Labor	Reginald Jordan	1,942	28.1	−11.4
Independent	Alfred Donnelly	527	7.6	+7.6
Total formal votes		6,908	97.9	−1.2
Informal votes		149	2.1	+1.2
Turnout		7,057	95.6	+0.4
Two-party-preferred result
Liberal and Country	Allan Rodda	4,703	68.1	+9.8
Labor	Reginald Jordan	2,205	31.9	−9.8
Liberal and Country hold		Swing	+9.8	

=== Wallaroo ===
1968 South Australian state election: Wallaroo
Party	Candidate	Votes	%	±%
Labor	Lloyd Hughes	2,899	52.0	−7.1
Liberal and Country	Keith Russack	2,612	46.8	+5.9
Democratic Labor	John McMahon	67	1.2	+1.2
Total formal votes		5,578	98.7	+0.6
Informal votes		74	1.3	−0.6
Turnout		5,652	96.9	+0.4
Two-party-preferred result
Labor	Lloyd Hughes	2,909	52.2	−6.9
Liberal and Country	Keith Russack	2,669	47.8	+6.9
Labor hold		Swing	−6.9	

=== West Torrens ===
1968 South Australian state election: West Torrens
Party	Candidate	Votes	%	±%
Labor	Glen Broomhill	20,283	55.7	−1.1
Liberal and Country	Ross Stanford	14,838	40.7	−2.5
Democratic Labor	Gary Lockwood	1,295	3.6	+3.6
Total formal votes		36,416	97.9	+0.6
Informal votes		771	2.1	−0.6
Turnout		37,187	94.5	+0.4
Two-party-preferred result
Labor	Glen Broomhill	20,477	56.2	−0.6
Liberal and Country	Ross Stanford	15,939	43.8	+0.6
Labor hold		Swing	−0.6	

=== Whyalla ===
1968 South Australian state election: Whyalla
Party	Candidate	Votes	%	±%
Labor	Ron Loveday	9,268	75.1	−4.7
Liberal and Country	Colin Norton	3,072	24.9	+24.9
Total formal votes		12,340	96.5	+0.1
Informal votes		449	3.5	−0.1
Turnout		12,789	90.5	+2.9
Labor hold		Swing	N/A	

=== Yorke Peninsula ===
1968 South Australian state election: Yorke Peninsula
Party	Candidate	Votes	%	±%
Liberal and Country	James Ferguson	4,651	74.9	+5.4
Labor	Leo Travis	1,563	25.2	−5.4
Total formal votes		6,214	98.4	+0.2
Informal votes		99	1.6	−0.2
Turnout		6,313	96.3	−1.2
Liberal and Country hold		Swing	+5.4	

== See also ==
- Members of the South Australian House of Assembly, 1968–1970
