= Results of the 1962 South Australian state election (House of Assembly) =

South Australian state election, 3 March 1962 House of Assembly << 1959–1965 >>
Enrolled voters	531,228				
Votes cast	417,461		Turnout	93.98%	+0.03%
Informal votes	10,267		Informal	2.46%	-0.43%
Summary of votes by party
Party	Primary votes	%	Swing	Seats	Change
Labor	219,790	53.98%	+4.63%	19	+ 2
Liberal and Country	140,507	34.51%	–2.44%	18	– 2
Democratic Labor	31,543	7.75%	+2.09%	0	± 0
Communist	2,528	0.62%	–0.80%	0	± 0
Independent	12,827	3.15%	–2.78%	2	± 0
Total	407,195			39	
Two-party-preferred
Liberal and Country		45.70%	–4.60%		
Labor		54.30%	+4.60%		

This is a list of House of Assembly results for the 1962 South Australian state election.

== Results by electoral district ==
=== Adelaide ===
1962 South Australian state election: Adelaide
Party	Candidate	Votes	%	±%
Labor	Sam Lawn	12,706	76.9	+3.9
Democratic Labor	William Ahem	3,062	18.5	+1.0
Communist	Elliott Johnston	757	4.6	−4.9
Total formal votes		16,525	95.0	+0.8
Informal votes		863	5.0	−0.8
Turnout		17,388	91.1	+1.4
Two-candidate-preferred result
Labor	Sam Lawn	13,274	80.3	+0.2
Democratic Labor	William Ahem	3,251	19.7	−0.2
Labor hold		Swing	+0.2	

=== Albert ===
1962 South Australian state election: Albert
Party	Candidate	Votes	%	±%
Liberal and Country	Bill Nankivell	unopposed		
Liberal and Country hold		Swing		

=== Alexandra ===
1962 South Australian state election: Alexandra
Party	Candidate	Votes	%	±%
Liberal and Country	David Brookman	4,348	58.8	−41.2
Labor	Ralph Dettman	2,353	31.8	+31.8
Independent	Frank Halleday	698	9.4	+9.4
Total formal votes		7,399	98.6	
Informal votes		101	1.4	
Turnout		7,500	95.7	
Two-party-preferred result
Liberal and Country	David Brookman	4,697	63.5	−36.5
Labor	Ralph Dettman	2,702	36.5	+36.5
Liberal and Country hold		Swing	N/A	

=== Angas ===
1962 South Australian state election: Angas
Party	Candidate	Votes	%	±%
Liberal and Country	Berthold Teusner	unopposed		
Liberal and Country hold		Swing		

=== Barossa ===
1962 South Australian state election: Barossa
Party	Candidate	Votes	%	±%
Liberal and Country	Condor Laucke	6,172	85.9	−14.1
Communist	Fred Slater	1,011	14.1	+14.1
Total formal votes		7,183	92.9	
Informal votes		549	7.1	
Turnout		7,732	94.4	
Liberal and Country hold		Swing		

=== Burnside ===
1962 South Australian state election: Burnside
Party	Candidate	Votes	%	±%
Liberal and Country	Joyce Steele	16,103	58.5	+1.4
Labor	Henry McMaster	9,455	34.4	+34.4
Democratic Labor	Gordon Kimpton	1,670	6.1	−7.2
Independent	Frank Rieck	291	1.1	−2.7
Total formal votes		27,519	97.7	−1.1
Informal votes		655	2.3	+1.1
Turnout		28,174	94.2	+0.5
Two-party-preferred result
Liberal and Country	Joyce Steele	17,568	64.2	−5.8
Labor	Henry McMaster	9,851	35.8	+35.8
Liberal and Country hold		Swing	N/A	

=== Burra ===
1962 South Australian state election: Burra
Party	Candidate	Votes	%	±%
Independent	Percy Quirke	3,218	56.5	+4.4
Liberal and Country	John Bailey	2,481	43.5	−4.4
Total formal votes		5,699	98.8	+0.1
Informal votes		67	1.2	−0.1
Turnout		5,766	95.7	−0.2
Independent hold		Swing	+4.4	

=== Chaffey ===
1962 South Australian state election: Chaffey
Party	Candidate	Votes	%	±%
Labor	Reg Curren	3,519	50.1	+19.6
Liberal and Country	Harold King	3,504	49.9	+5.4
Total formal votes		7,023	97.8	−0.6
Informal votes		156	2.2	+0.6
Turnout		7,179	95.9	+0.1
Labor gain from Liberal and Country		Swing	+8.3	

=== Edwardstown ===
1962 South Australian state election: Edwardstown
Party	Candidate	Votes	%	±%
Labor	Frank Walsh	19,513	71.6	+14.9
Democratic Labor	Daniel Faulkner	7,756	28.4	+20.7
Total formal votes		27,269	96.1	−1.9
Informal votes		1,114	3.9	+1.9
Turnout		28,383	94.7	+0.3
Labor hold		Swing	N/A	

=== Enfield ===
1962 South Australian state election: Enfield
Party	Candidate	Votes	%	±%
Labor	Jack Jennings	23,225	77.7	+9.4
Democratic Labor	Keith Cornell	6,671	22.3	+14.3
Total formal votes		29,896	95.8	0.0
Informal votes		1,324	4.2	0.0
Turnout		31,220	93.9	0.0
Labor hold		Swing	N/A	

=== Eyre ===
1962 South Australian state election: Eyre
Party	Candidate	Votes	%	±%
Liberal and Country	George Bockelberg	unopposed		
Liberal and Country hold		Swing		

=== Flinders ===
1962 South Australian state election: Flinders
Party	Candidate	Votes	%	±%
Liberal and Country	Glen Pearson	3,471	53.5	−6.6
Labor	James Hudson	3,013	46.5	+6.6
Total formal votes		6,484	98.2	−0.6
Informal votes		121	1.8	+0.6
Turnout		6,605	95.5	+0.4
Liberal and Country hold		Swing	−6.6	

=== Frome ===
1962 South Australian state election: Frome
Party	Candidate	Votes	%	±%
Labor	Tom Casey	2,932	55.6	+4.0
Liberal and Country	Maxwell Hams	2,124	40.3	−1.9
Democratic Labor	John McMahon	217	4.1	−2.1
Total formal votes		5,273	99.0	+0.4
Informal votes		53	1.0	−0.4
Turnout		5,326	91.5	+0.6
Two-party-preferred result
Labor	Tom Casey	2,965	56.2	+3.7
Liberal and Country	Maxwell Hams	2,308	43.8	−3.7
Labor hold		Swing	+3.7	

=== Gawler ===
1962 South Australian state election: Gawler
Party	Candidate	Votes	%	±%
Labor	John Clark	12,144	66.3	−1.4
Liberal and Country	Kevin Breen	5,404	29.5	−2.8
Democratic Labor	Eduard Smulders	762	4.2	+4.2
Total formal votes		18,310	97.9	+0.7
Informal votes		388	2.1	−0.7
Turnout		18,698	92.4	−1.2
Two-party-preferred result
Labor	John Clark	12,258	66.9	−0.8
Liberal and Country	Kevin Breen	6,052	33.1	+0.8
Labor hold		Swing	−0.8	

=== Glenelg ===
1962 South Australian state election: Glenelg
Party	Candidate	Votes	%	±%
Liberal and Country	Baden Pattinson	15,109	49.9	−5.8
Labor	Ian Charles	13,346	44.1	+7.7
Democratic Labor	Nathaniel Bishop	1,809	6.0	−1.9
Total formal votes		30,264	98.5	+0.5
Informal votes		445	1.5	−0.5
Turnout		30,709	94.2	+0.3
Two-party-preferred result
Liberal and Country	Baden Pattinson	16,128	53.3	−9.1
Labor	Ian Charles	14,136	46.7	+9.1
Liberal and Country hold		Swing	−9.1	

=== Gouger ===
1962 South Australian state election: Gouger
Party	Candidate	Votes	%	±%
Liberal and Country	Steele Hall	unopposed		
Liberal and Country hold		Swing		

=== Gumeracha ===
1962 South Australian state election: Gumeracha
Party	Candidate	Votes	%	±%
Liberal and Country	Thomas Playford	5,202	81.1	+7.7
Democratic Labor	Patrick Coffey	1,211	18.9	+18.9
Total formal votes		6,413	95.4	−3.0
Informal votes		309	4.6	+3.0
Turnout		6,722	95.8	+0.2
Liberal and Country hold		Swing	N/A	

=== Hindmarsh ===
1962 South Australian state election: Hindmarsh
Party	Candidate	Votes	%	±%
Labor	Cyril Hutchens	unopposed		
Labor hold		Swing		

=== Light ===
1962 South Australian state election: Light
Party	Candidate	Votes	%	±%
Liberal and Country	John Freebairn	2,606	43.9	−27.9
Labor	Colin Wurst	2,005	33.8	+5.6
Independent	Eli Hambour	1,322	22.3	+22.3
Total formal votes		5,933	99.1	+0.5
Informal votes		54	0.9	−0.5
Turnout		5,987	97.4	+2.0
Two-party-preferred result
Liberal and Country	John Freebairn	3,614	60.9	−10.9
Labor	Colin Wurst	2,319	39.1	+10.9
Liberal and Country hold		Swing	−10.9	

=== Millicent ===
1962 South Australian state election: Millicent
Party	Candidate	Votes	%	±%
Labor	Des Corcoran	3,530	53.1	−1.4
Liberal and Country	Ren DeGaris	3,012	45.3	−0.2
Democratic Labor	Neil Henderson	106	1.6	+1.6
Total formal votes		6,648	99.3	+0.1
Informal votes		47	0.7	−0.1
Turnout		6,695	96.5	+0.4
Two-party-preferred result
Labor	Des Corcoran	3,546	53.3	−1.2
Liberal and Country	Ren DeGaris	3,102	46.7	+1.2
Labor hold		Swing	−1.2	

=== Mitcham ===
1962 South Australian state election: Mitcham
Party	Candidate	Votes	%	±%
Liberal and Country	Robin Millhouse	13,746	63.8	−3.4
Labor	Eric Thorp	6,542	30.4	+1.2
Democratic Labor	Edward Farrell	1,259	5.8	+2.2
Total formal votes		21,547	98.8	+0.6
Informal votes		264	1.2	−0.6
Turnout		21,811	92.5	−0.9
Two-party-preferred result
Liberal and Country	Robin Millhouse	14,816	68.8	−1.4
Labor	Eric Thorp	6,731	31.2	+1.4
Liberal and Country hold		Swing	−1.4	

=== Mount Gambier ===
1962 South Australian state election: Mount Gambier
Party	Candidate	Votes	%	±%
Labor	Ron Ralston	5,896	68.7	+10.4
Liberal and Country	Frank Haines	2,681	31.3	−10.4
Total formal votes		8,577	98.6	−0.7
Informal votes		124	1.4	+0.7
Turnout		8,701	95.0	−0.8
Labor hold		Swing	+10.4	

=== Murray ===
1962 South Australian state election: Murray
Party	Candidate	Votes	%	±%
Labor	Gabe Bywaters	5,263	70.6	+5.8
Liberal and Country	Clement Wilkin	2,192	29.4	−3.9
Total formal votes		7,455	98.4	−0.2
Informal votes		122	1.6	+0.2
Turnout		7,577	96.3	0.0
Labor hold		Swing	+5.5	

=== Norwood ===
1962 South Australian state election: Norwood
Party	Candidate	Votes	%	±%
Labor	Don Dunstan	11,315	58.1	+4.0
Liberal and Country	Richard Wegener	7,237	37.2	−2.7
Democratic Labor	Francis Dempsey	920	4.7	−1.3
Total formal votes		19,472	98.1	+0.5
Informal votes		383	1.9	−0.5
Turnout		19,855	93.8	−0.5
Two-party-preferred result
Labor	Don Dunstan	11,453	58.8	+3.8
Liberal and Country	Richard Wegener	8,402	41.2	−3.8
Labor hold		Swing	+3.8	

=== Onkaparinga ===
1962 South Australian state election: Onkaparinga
Party	Candidate	Votes	%	±%
Liberal and Country	Howard Shannon	3,682	56.4	−6.9
Labor	Peter Staniford	2,846	43.6	+6.9
Total formal votes		6,528	98.8	+0.9
Informal votes		77	1.2	−0.9
Turnout		6,605	95.8	+1.2
Liberal and Country hold		Swing	−6.9	

=== Port Adelaide ===
1962 South Australian state election: Port Adelaide
Party	Candidate	Votes	%	±%
Labor	John Ryan	17,834	83.3	+3.1
Democratic Labor	George Basivovs	2,811	13.1	−0.4
Communist	James Moss	770	3.6	−2.8
Total formal votes		21,415	96.0	+1.2
Informal votes		885	4.0	−1.2
Turnout		22,300	93.6	−0.6
Two-candidate-preferred result
Labor	John Ryan	18,412	86.0	+1.1
Democratic Labor	George Basivovs	3,003	14.0	−1.1
Labor hold		Swing	+1.1	

=== Port Pirie ===
1962 South Australian state election: Port Pirie
Party	Candidate	Votes	%	±%
Labor	Dave McKee	5,513	90.8	+31.7
Independent	Ralph Rinaldi	559	9.2	+9.2
Total formal votes		6,072	96.9	−1.0
Informal votes		195	3.1	+1.0
Turnout		6,267	94.8	−0.7
Labor hold		Swing	N/A	

=== Ridley ===
1962 South Australian state election: Ridley
Party	Candidate	Votes	%	±%
Independent	Tom Stott	2,524	38.7	−4.0
Liberal and Country	Jack Andrew	2,366	36.3	−1.4
Labor	Darcy Nielsen	1,630	25.0	+5.4
Total formal votes		6,520	99.0	0.0
Informal votes		68	1.0	0.0
Turnout		6,588	96.2	−0.6
Two-candidate-preferred result
Independent	Tom Stott	3,734	57.3	+0.6
Liberal and Country	Jack Andrew	2,786	42.7	−0.6
Independent hold		Swing	+0.6	

=== Rocky River ===
1962 South Australian state election: Rocky River
Party	Candidate	Votes	%	±%
Liberal and Country	James Heaslip	unopposed		
Liberal and Country hold		Swing		

=== Semaphore ===
1962 South Australian state election: Semaphore
Party	Candidate	Votes	%	±%
Labor	Harold Tapping	unopposed		
Labor hold		Swing		

=== Stirling ===
1962 South Australian state election: Stirling
Party	Candidate	Votes	%	±%
Liberal and Country	William Jenkins	4,497	66.2	−33.8
Independent	Clifford Thorpe	2,293	33.8	+33.8
Total formal votes		6,790	98.5	
Informal votes		102	1.5	
Turnout		6,892	96.1	
Liberal and Country hold		Swing	N/A	

=== Stuart ===
1962 South Australian state election: Stuart
Party	Candidate	Votes	%	±%
Labor	Lindsay Riches	6,496	88.0	−0.4
Independent	James Yates	889	12.0	+0.4
Total formal votes		7,385	96.4	+0.3
Informal votes		272	3.6	−0.3
Turnout		7,657	93.3	−0.1
Labor hold		Swing	−0.4	

=== Torrens ===
1962 South Australian state election: Torrens
Party	Candidate	Votes	%	±%
Liberal and Country	John Coumbe	9,642	49.8	−4.1
Labor	Chris Hurford	8,770	45.3	+5.9
Democratic Labor	Ursula Cock	933	4.8	−1.9
Total formal votes		19,345	98.4	+0.1
Informal votes		312	1.6	−0.1
Turnout		19,657	94.0	+1.6
Two-party-preferred result
Liberal and Country	John Coumbe	10,421	53.9	−5.7
Labor	Christopher Hurford	8,652	46.1	+5.7
Liberal and Country hold		Swing	−5.7	

=== Unley ===
1962 South Australian state election: Unley
Party	Candidate	Votes	%	±%
Labor	Gil Langley	9,424	50.5	+8.7
Liberal and Country	Colin Dunnage	8,063	43.2	−7.0
Independent	William Dempsey	1,179	6.3	+6.3
Total formal votes		18,666	97.8	+0.2
Informal votes		425	2.2	−0.2
Turnout		19,091	92.7	−1.0
Two-party-preferred result
Labor	Gil Langley	10,013	53.6	+10.6
Liberal and Country	Colin Dunnage	8,653	46.4	−10.6
Labor gain from Liberal and Country		Swing	+10.6	

=== Victoria ===
1962 South Australian state election: Victoria
Party	Candidate	Votes	%	±%
Liberal and Country	Leslie Harding	3,651	53.7	−3.0
Labor	Alfred Donnelly	3,147	46.3	+8.5
Total formal votes		6,798	99.0	0.0
Informal votes		67	1.0	0.0
Turnout		6,865	95.1	−0.1
Liberal and Country hold		Swing	−7.7	

=== Wallaroo ===
1962 South Australian state election: Wallaroo
Party	Candidate	Votes	%	±%
Labor	Lloyd Hughes	3,784	62.9	+4.0
Liberal and Country	Arthur Philbey	2,231	37.1	−4.0
Total formal votes		6,015	98.8	−0.1
Informal votes		71	1.2	+0.1
Turnout		6,086	96.6	−0.3
Labor hold		Swing	+4.0	

=== West Torrens ===
1962 South Australian state election: West Torrens
Party	Candidate	Votes	%	±%
Labor	Fred Walsh	16,453	57.5	+6.9
Liberal and Country	Parker Morton	10,983	38.4	−5.5
Democratic Labor	Thomas Keain	1,177	4.1	−1.4
Total formal votes		28,613	98.6	+1.0
Informal votes		392	1.4	−1.0
Turnout		29,005	93.8	+0.2
Two-party-preferred result
Labor	Fred Walsh	16,630	58.1	+6.7
Liberal and Country	Parker Morton	11,983	41.9	−6.7
Labor hold		Swing	+6.7	

=== Whyalla ===
1962 South Australian state election: Whyalla
Party	Candidate	Votes	%	±%
Labor	Ron Loveday	7,126	87.3	+2.4
Independent	Allan Mossop	1,033	12.7	−2.4
Total formal votes		8,159	96.9	+0.5
Informal votes		262	3.1	−0.5
Turnout		8,421	88.6	−0.2
Labor hold		Swing	+2.4	

=== Yorke Peninsula ===
1962 South Australian state election: Yorke Peninsula
Party	Candidate	Votes	%	±%
Liberal and Country	Cecil Hincks	unopposed		
Liberal and Country hold		Swing		

== See also ==
- Candidates of the 1962 South Australian state election
- Members of the South Australian House of Assembly, 1962–1965
