= Candidates of the 1968 South Australian state election =

The 1968 South Australian state election was held on 2 March 1968.

== Retiring Members ==
=== Labor ===
- Frank Walsh, MHA (Edwardstown)

=== Liberal and Country ===
- Percy Quirke, MHA (Burra)
- George Bockelberg, MHA (Eyre)
- Thomas Playford, MHA (Gumeracha)
- Howard Shannon, MHA (Onkaparinga)
- James Heaslip, MHA (Rocky River)

== House of Assembly ==
Sitting members are shown in bold text. Successful candidates are highlighted in the relevant colour. Where there is possible confusion, an asterisk (*) is also used.

Electorate	Held by	Labor candidate	LCL candidate	Other candidates
Adelaide	Labor	**Sam Lawn**	Donald Maddocks	Elliott Johnston (Comm)
Albert	LCL	Graham Maguire	**Bill Nankivell**	
Alexandra	LCL	Robert Harris	**David Brookman**	Betty Bishop (Ind); William Johns (CP)
Angas	LCL	Brian Chatterton	**Berthold Teusner**	
Barossa	Labor	**Molly Byrne**	Roger Goldsworthy	Bernard McRae (DLP); Luke Horan (Ind)
Burnside	LCL	Joyce Henriott	**Joyce Steele**	
Burra	LCL	John Phelan	Ernest Allen	William Ahern (DLP)
Chaffey	Labor	**Reg Curren**	Peter Arnold	James Trevor (CP); Allan Anderson (Ind)
Edwardstown	Labor	Geoff Virgo	David Rogers	Helen Anderson (Ind)
Enfield	Labor	**Jack Jennings**	Allan Stock	Edwin Meier (SC)
Eyre	LCL	Jack Mortimer	Ernie Edwards	William Wilkins (Ind); Morley Rodda (CP)
Flinders	LCL	Hugh Patterson	**Glen Pearson**	Douglas Barnes (DLP)
Frome	Labor	**Tom Casey**	Maxwell Hams	
Gawler	Labor	**John Clark**	Stewart Gilchrist	Frank Lawrence (SC)
Glenelg	Labor	**Hugh Hudson**	John McCoy	Mark Posa (DLP)
Gouger	LCL	Edward Eaton	**Steele Hall**	Albert Apponyi (SC); Peter Meredith (DLP)
Gumeracha	LCL	Cyril Swaine	Bryant Giles	
Hindmarsh	Labor	**Cyril Hutchens**	Richard Leeton	
Light	LCL	Ernest Fahey	**John Freebairn**	
Millicent	Labor	**Des Corcoran**	Martin Cameron	
Mitcham	LCL	Peter Gilchrist	**Robin Millhouse**	
Mount Gambier	Labor	**Allan Burdon**	Archibald Scott	
Murray	Labor	**Gabe Bywaters**	Ivon Wardle	Terence Critchley (DLP)
Norwood	Labor	**Don Dunstan**	David Tonkin	Kevin McRae (DLP)
Onkaparinga	LCL	David Rhodes	Stan Evans	Robert Harper (CP)
Port Adelaide	Labor	**John Ryan**	Graeme Sargent	Denis McEvoy (SC); Peter Symon (Comm)
Port Pirie	Labor	**Dave McKee**	Graham Hancock	Wesley Thomas (Ind)
Ridley	Independent	Francis Bulbeck	Geoffrey Blight	**Tom Stott** (Ind)
Rocky River	LCL	Jim Dunford	Howard Venning	
Semaphore	Labor	**Reg Hurst**	Reginald Appelkamp	Edward Wright (SC)
Stirling	LCL	Glenton Gregory	**William McAnaney**	
Stuart	Labor	**Lindsay Riches**	Robert Semmens	
Torrens	LCL	Terry McRae	**John Coumbe**	George Basivovs (DLP)
Unley	Labor	**Gil Langley**	Lewis Short	Ted Farrell (DLP)
Victoria	LCL	Reginald Jordan	**Allan Rodda**	Alfred Donnelly (Ind)
Wallaroo	Labor	**Lloyd Hughes**	Keith Russack	John McMahon (DLP)
West Torrens	Labor	**Glen Broomhill**	Ross Stanford	Gary Lockwood (DLP)
Whyalla	Labor	**Ron Loveday**	Colin Norton	
Yorke Peninsula	LCL	Leo Travis	**James Ferguson**	

== Legislative Council ==
Sitting members are shown in bold text. Successful candidates are highlighted in the relevant colour and identified by an asterisk (*).

District	Held by	Labor candidates	LCL candidates	Other candidates
Central No. 1	2 Labor	**Bert Shard***; **Alfred Kneebone***		Edward Timlin (DLP)
Central No. 2	2 LCL	Gregory Stevens; Joan Harcourt	**Arthur Rymill***; **Murray Hill***	Brian Nash (DLP)
Midland	2 LCL	Cec Creedon; Leonard Krieg	**Ross Story***; **Boyd Dawkins***	
Northern	2 LCL	Kevin Diggens; James Scott	**Lyell McEwin***; **Gordon Gilfillan***	
Southern	2 LCL	Geoff McLaren; Dennis Beager	**Norman Jude***; **Victor Springett***	
