= Members of the South Australian House of Assembly, 1968–1970 =

This is a list of members of the South Australian House of Assembly from 1968 to 1970, as elected at the 1968 state election:

Name	Party	Electorate	Term of office
Ernest Allen	LCL	Burra	1968–1977
Peter Arnold	LCL	Chaffey	1968–1970, 1973–1993
Hon David Brookman	LCL	Alexandra	1948–1973
Glen Broomhill	Labor	West Torrens	1965–1979
Allan Burdon	Labor	Mount Gambier	1962–1975
Molly Byrne	Labor	Barossa	1965–1979
Tom Casey	Labor	Frome	1960–1970
John Clark	Labor	Gawler	1952–1973
Des Corcoran^{[1]}	Labor	Millicent	1962–1968, 1968–1982
John Coumbe	LCL	Torrens	1956–1977
Hon Don Dunstan	Labor	Norwood	1953–1979
Ernie Edwards	LCL	Eyre	1968–1970
Stan Evans	LCL	Onkaparinga	1968–1993
James Ferguson	LCL	Yorke Peninsula	1963–1973
John Freebairn	LCL	Light	1962–1970
Bryant Giles	LCL	Gumeracha	1968–1970
Steele Hall	LCL	Gouger	1959–1974
Hugh Hudson	Labor	Glenelg	1965–1979
Lloyd Hughes	Labor	Wallaroo	1957–1970
Reg Hurst	Labor	Semaphore	1964–1973
Hon Cyril Hutchens	Labor	Hindmarsh	1950–1970
Joe Jennings	Labor	Enfield	1953–1977
Gil Langley	Labor	Unley	1962–1982
Sam Lawn	Labor	Adelaide	1950–1971
Hon Ron Loveday	Labor	Whyalla	1956–1970
William McAnaney	LCL	Stirling	1963–1975
Dave McKee	Labor	Port Pirie	1959–1975
Robin Millhouse	LCL	Mitcham	1955–1982
Bill Nankivell	LCL	Albert	1959–1979
Hon Sir Glen Pearson	LCL	Flinders	1951–1970
Lindsay Riches	Labor	Stuart	1933–1970
Allan Rodda	LCL	Victoria	1965–1985
John Ryan	Labor	Port Adelaide	1959–1975
Joyce Steele	LCL	Burnside	1959–1973
Hon Tom Stott	Independent	Ridley	1933–1970
Hon Berthold Teusner	LCL	Angas	1944–1970
Howard Venning	LCL	Rocky River	1968–1979
Geoff Virgo	Labor	Edwardstown	1968–1979
Ivon Wardle	LCL	Murray	1968–1977

^{1} The narrow re-election of the Labor member for Millicent, Des Corcoran, was overturned by the Court of Disputed Returns on 28 May 1968. Corcoran won the resulting by-election on 22 June 1968.
