= Members of the South Australian House of Assembly, 1962–1965 =

This is a list of members of the South Australian House of Assembly from 1962 to 1965, as elected at the 1962 state election:

Name	Party	Electorate	Term of office
George Bockelberg	LCL	Eyre	1956–1968
Hon David Brookman	LCL	Alexandra	1948–1973
Allan Burdon ^{[1]}	Labor	Mount Gambier	1962–1975
Gabe Bywaters	Labor	Murray	1956–1968
Tom Casey	Labor	Frome	1960–1970
John Clark	Labor	Gawler	1952–1973
Des Corcoran	Labor	Millicent	1962–1968, 1968–1982
John Coumbe	LCL	Torrens	1956–1977
Reg Curren	Labor	Chaffey	1962–1968, 1970–1973
Don Dunstan	Labor	Norwood	1953–1979
James Ferguson ^{[2]}	LCL	Yorke Peninsula	1963–1973
John Freebairn	LCL	Light	1962–1970
Steele Hall	LCL	Gouger	1959–1974
Leslie Harding	LCL	Victoria	1956–1965
James Heaslip	LCL	Rocky River	1949–1968
Hon Sir Cecil Hincks ^{[2]}	LCL	Yorke Peninsula	1941–1963
Lloyd Hughes	Labor	Wallaroo	1957–1970
Reg Hurst ^{[4]}	Labor	Semaphore	1964–1973
Cyril Hutchens	Labor	Hindmarsh	1950–1970
William Jenkins ^{[3]}	LCL	Stirling	1952–1963
Joe Jennings	Labor	Enfield	1953–1977
Gil Langley	Labor	Unley	1962–1982
Condor Laucke	LCL	Barossa	1956–1965
Sam Lawn	Labor	Adelaide	1950–1971
Ron Loveday	Labor	Whyalla	1956–1970
William McAnaney ^{[3]}	LCL	Stirling	1963–1975
Dave McKee	Labor	Port Pirie	1959–1975
Robin Millhouse	LCL	Mitcham	1955–1982
Bill Nankivell	LCL	Albert	1959–1979
Hon Baden Pattinson	LCL	Glenelg	1930–1938, 1947–1965
Hon Glen Pearson	LCL	Flinders	1951–1970
Hon Sir Thomas Playford	LCL	Gumeracha	1933–1968
Percy Quirke	Independent/LCL ^{[5]}	Burra	1941–1968
Ron Ralston ^{[1]}	Labor	Mount Gambier	1958–1962
Lindsay Riches	Labor	Stuart	1933–1970
John Ryan	Labor	Port Adelaide	1959–1975
Howard Shannon	LCL	Onkaparinga	1933–1968
Joyce Steele	LCL	Burnside	1959–1973
Tom Stott	Independent	Ridley	1933–1970
Harold Tapping ^{[4]}	Labor	Semaphore	1946–1964
Hon Berthold Teusner	LCL	Angas	1944–1970
Frank Walsh	Labor	Edwardstown	1941–1968
Fred Walsh	Labor	West Torrens	1942–1965

^{1} The Labor member for Mount Gambier, Ron Ralston, died on 30 October 1962. Labor candidate Allan Burdon won the resulting by-election on 15 December 1962.
^{2} The LCL member for Yorke Peninsula, Sir Cecil Hincks, died on 1 January 1963. LCL candidate James Ferguson won the resulting by-election on 9 February 1963.
^{3} The LCL member for Stirling, William Jenkins, died on 30 August 1963. LCL candidate William McAnaney won the resulting by-election on 28 September 1963.
^{4} The Labor member for Semaphore, Harold Tapping, died on 6 September 1964. Labor candidate Reg Hurst won the resulting by-election on 3 October 1964.
^{5} The member for Burra, Percy Quirke, was elected as an independent in 1962, but joined the LCL and entered the ministry in 1963.
