= 1968 South Australian state election =

- 2 March 1968

All 39 seats in the South Australian House of Assembly 20 seats were needed for a majority
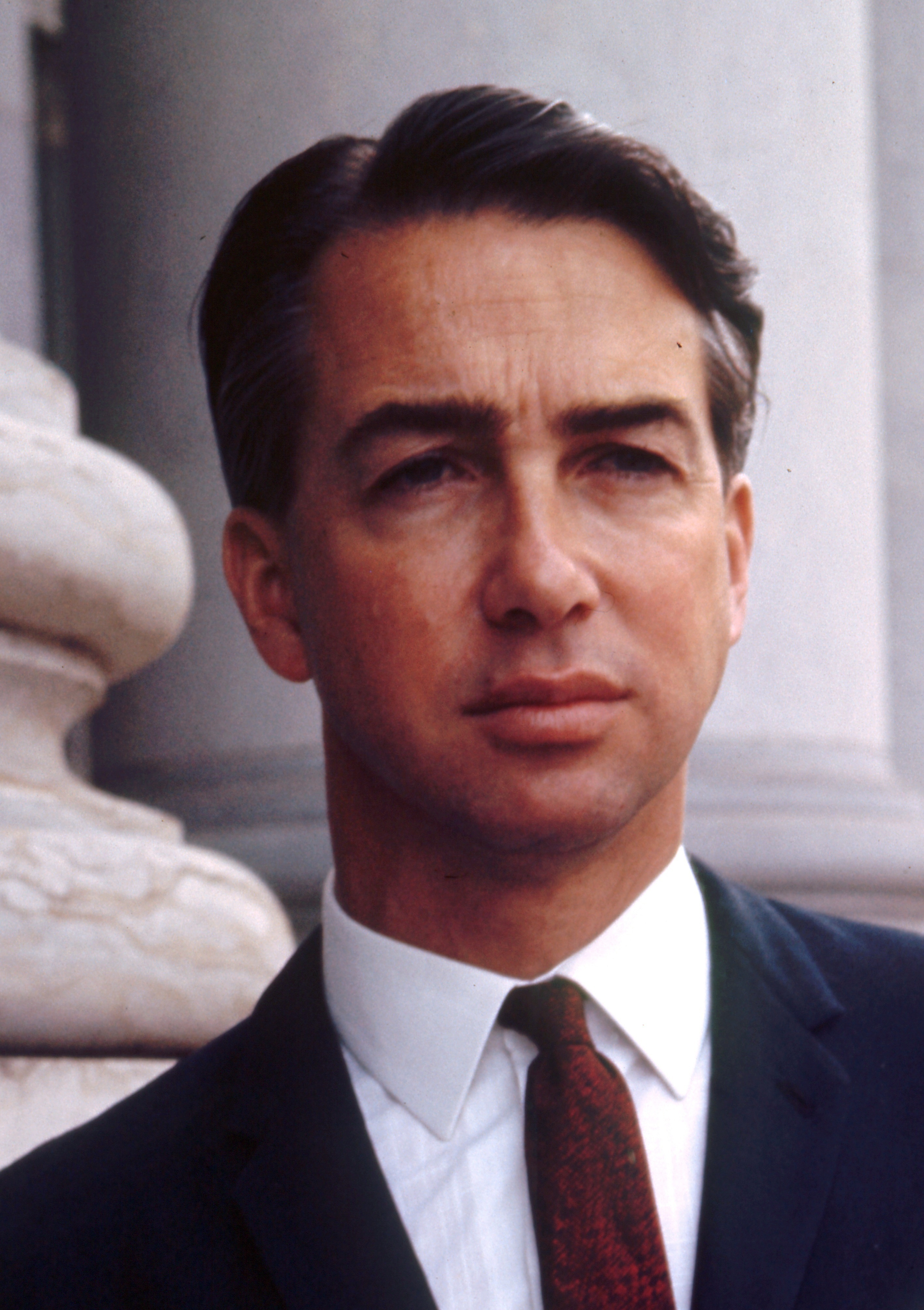

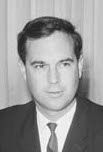
	First party	Second party
Leader	Don Dunstan	Steele Hall
Party	Labor	Liberal and Country
Leader since	1 June 1967	13 July 1966
Leader's seat	Norwood	Gouger
Last election	21 seats	17 seats
Seats won	19 seats	19 seats
Seat change	▼2	▲2
Percentage	53.2%	46.8%
Swing	▼1.1	▲1.1
- A map of South Australian electorates from 1955 to 1969, during the height of the Playmander.
Premier before election
Don Dunstan
Labor
Elected Premier
Steele Hall
Liberal and Country

The 1968 South Australian State election was held in South Australia on 2 March 1968. All 39 seats in the South Australian House of Assembly were up for election; 38 of the 39 contests were won by candidates from Australia's two major political parties. The incumbent Labor Party South Australia led by Premier of South Australia Don Dunstan and the Liberal and Country League led by Leader of the Opposition Steele Hall) both won 19 seats. The sole independent candidate to win a race, Tom Stott of the Ridley electorate, joined with the LCL's 19 seats to form a coalition government that held a 20 to 19 majority, thus defeating the Dunstan Labor government.

== Key dates ==
Date	Event
5 February 1968	Writs were issued by the governor to proceed with an election.
11 February 1968	Close of nominations.
2 March 1968	Polling day, between the hours of 8am and 6pm.
2 April 1968	Return of the writs.
16 April 1968	Parliament resumed for business.
17 April 1968	The First Dunstan ministry resigned and the Hall Ministry was sworn in.

== Outcome ==
The election saw the Liberal and Country League opposition form a minority government, winning the same number of seats in the House of Assembly as the incumbent Australian Labor Party government, despite the fact that Labor won 53.2 percent of the two-party vote, and the LCL only 46.8. This result was due to what had become known as the Playmander − an electoral malapportionment that had previously resulted in the LCL also forming government despite having a clear minority of the statewide two-party vote in 1944, 1953 and 1962.

Labor lost the seats of Murray and Chaffey to the LCL. Murray was decided by a mere 21 votes, which, if they had gone in the other direction, would have secured Labor's return for a second term of government.

The LCL were able to form minority government in the hung parliament with confidence and supply from the long-serving crossbench independent MP Tom Stott, who held the balance of power. Stott, a good friend of former premier Playford, and an opponent of Labor, agreed to support the LCL and became Speaker of the South Australian House of Assembly. This allowed the LCL to form government by one seat.

LCL leader Steele Hall had served as Leader of the Opposition for two years before becoming premier. Young and handsome, he was also the first Australian state premier to sport sideburns. Indeed, the 1968 election, fought between Hall and his opponent Don Dunstan, was described by the Democratic Labor Party as the battle of "the matinée idols".

The 1968 election was also notable for the result in the seat of Millicent. Labor won the seat by a single vote. However, a by-election was triggered by a decision of the Court of Disputed Returns. The by-election saw Labor increase their margin. Notably, turnout increased at the by-election.

== Subsequent electoral reform ==
Hall was embarrassed that the LCL was even in a position to govern despite having clearly lost in terms of actual votes. Acknowledging that the obvious unfairness of the election result put him in a politically unacceptable position, he decided to institute electoral reforms to weaken the malapportionment of the Playmander.

Since 1936, the House of Assembly had comprised 39 seats – 13 in metropolitan Adelaide, and 26 in the country. That was in accordance with the requirement of the State Constitution that there be two country seats for every one in Adelaide. However, by 1968, Adelaide accounted for two-thirds of the state's population, a nearly-exact reversal of the situation three decades earlier. Although the population in metropolitan areas outnumbered that in rural areas 620,000 to 450,000, the number of members representing the rural areas was twice that allotted to metropolitan areas.

The most populous metropolitan seats had five to ten times as many voters as the least populous rural seats. For instance, the rural seat of Frome had 4,500 formal votes, while the metropolitan seat of Enfield had 42,000 formal votes. At the election, the LCL won only three metropolitan seats – Burnside, Mitcham and Torrens. However, Labor lost two country seats to the LCL, which resulted in a hung parliament.

Hall's reforms included increasing the size of House of Assembly to 47 seats – 28 metropolitan seats and 19 rural seats – the increase of 15 metropolitan seats more than doubling the previous number. Because country areas remained over-represented, the change fell short of the "one vote one value" that Labor had demanded. The most populous metropolitan seats still contained double the number of voters in the least populous rural seats. Nevertheless, while the rural weighting remained, Adelaide would now elect a majority of the legislature. Even at its height in the 1940s and 1950s, the LCL had been all but non-existent in Adelaide. Under the circumstances, the reforms made it a near-certainty that Labor would win the next election; indeed, conventional wisdom held that Hall was well aware he had effectively made Dunstan premier for a second time.

== Subsequent collapse of minority government and further reforms ==
Eventually, Hall and Stott fell out over the proposed Chowilla Dam. Stott wanted the dam built in his electorate, while Hall thought its construction was not justified. Constituent pressure forced Stott to vote against the Hall government, leading to an early election – the 1970 South Australian state election – which was fought on much fairer electoral boundaries. As expected, Dunstan led Labor to a decisive victory. Further reforms replaced the Playmander with a "one vote one value" system after the 1975 election, at which Labor retained government despite a two-party-preferred vote of 49.2 percent.

A further reform was effected following the 1989 election, at which Labor retained government despite a two-party vote of 48.1 percent. It was enacted that the South Australian Electoral Districts Boundaries Commission should redraw electoral boundaries after each election, with the objective that the party which received over 50 percent of the state-wide two-party vote at the forthcoming election should win the majority of seats. South Australia is the only state that redistributes electoral boundaries on the basis of the two-party vote. One element of the Playmander remains to this day − the change from multi-member electorates to single-member electorates.

== Results ==
Arrangement of the House of Assembly after the 1968 state election.

South Australian state election, 2 March 1968 House of Assembly << 1965–1970 >>
Enrolled voters	609,627				
Votes cast	575,949		Turnout	94.48%	–0.11%
Informal votes	13,291		Informal	2.31%	–0.50%
Summary of votes by party
Party	Primary votes	%	Swing	Seats	Change
Labor	292,445	51.98%	–3.06%	19	– 2
Liberal and Country	246,560	43.82%	+7.89%	19	+ 2
Democratic Labor	9,223	1.64%	–2.71%	0	± 0
Social Credit	4,792	0.85%	–1.07%	0	± 0
National	2,251	0.40%	–0.05%	0	± 0
Communist	1,606	0.29%	–0.15%	0	± 0
Independent	5,781	1.03%	–0.85%	1	± 0
Total	562,658			39	
Two-party-preferred
Liberal and Country		46.80%	+1.10%		
Labor		53.20%	–1.10%		

- The state-wide two-party preferred vote figures (available from 1944 onward) had only been able to be estimated prior to 1968, as a result of both major parties consistently declining to field candidates in all electorates. This pattern had been occurring ever since numerous controversial fundamental electoral changes (later dubbed the Playmander) took effect from 1938, due in particular to the replacement of the multi-member system (previously used continuously since self-government) with the single-member system. From 1968 onward, both major parties have chosen to consistently field candidates in all electorates, which has since enabled state-wide two-party figures to be calculated rather than estimated.

== Post-election pendulum ==
Government seats (20)
Marginal
Murray	Ivon Wardle	LCL	0.2%
Alexandra	David Brookman	LCL	3.9%
Eyre	Ernie Edwards	LCL	4.9%
Ridley	Tom Stott	IND	5.6% v LCL
Fairly safe
Chaffey	Peter Arnold	LCL	6.0%
Torrens	John Coumbe	LCL	6.5%
Burnside	Joyce Steele	LCL	9.4%
Safe
Gouger	Steele Hall	LCL	11.3%
Flinders	Glen Pearson	LCL	13.2%
Mitcham	Robin Millhouse	LCL	14.8%
Burra	Ernest Allen	LCL	16.2%
Onkaparinga	Stan Evans	LCL	16.9%
Gumeracha	Bryant Giles	LCL	17.9%
Angas	Berthold Teusner	LCL	18.0%
Victoria	Allan Rodda	LCL	18.1%
Light	John Freebairn	LCL	18.9%
Rocky River	Howard Venning	LCL	20.1%
Stirling	William McAnaney	LCL	22.0%
Yorke Peninsula	James Ferguson	LCL	24.9%
Albert	Bill Nankivell	LCL	26.7%

Opposition seats (19)
Marginal
Millicent	Des Corcoran	ALP	0.0%
Unley	Gil Langley	ALP	1.5%
Wallaroo	Lloyd Hughes	ALP	2.2%
Barossa	Molly Byrne	ALP	3.1%
Glenelg	Hugh Hudson	ALP	3.9%
Fairly safe
West Torrens	Glen Broomhill	ALP	6.2%
Norwood	Don Dunstan	ALP	6.6%
Edwardstown	Geoff Virgo	ALP	8.4%
Mount Gambier	Allan Burdon	ALP	8.6%
Frome	Tom Casey	ALP	8.8%
Safe
Gawler	John Clark	ALP	17.1%
Enfield	Jack Jennings	ALP	18.1%
Adelaide	Sam Lawn	ALP	19.4%
Semaphore	Reg Hurst	ALP	21.3%
Hindmarsh	Cyril Hutchens	ALP	22.2%
Port Adelaide	John Ryan	ALP	23.1%
Port Pirie	Dave McKee	ALP	23.5%
Stuart	Lindsay Riches	ALP	23.9%
Whyalla	Ron Loveday	ALP	25.1%

== Legislative Council results ==
1968 Legislative Council result
Party		Seats
Australian Labor Party	52.8%	2
Liberal and Country League	41.9%	8
Democratic Labor Party	5.3%	0
1968–1973 Legislative Council
Party		Seats
Liberal and Country League		16
Australian Labor Party		4

== See also ==
- Results of the South Australian state election, 1968 (House of Assembly)
- Candidates of the 1968 South Australian state election
- Members of the South Australian House of Assembly, 1968-1970
- Members of the South Australian Legislative Council, 1968-1970
- Playmander
