= Members of the South Australian House of Assembly, 1959–1962 =

This is a list of members of the South Australian House of Assembly from 1959 to 1962, as elected at the 1959 state election:

| Name | Party | Electorate | Term of office |
|---|---|---|---|
| George Bockelberg | LCL | Eyre | 1956–1968 |
| Hon David Brookman | LCL | Alexandra | 1948–1973 |
| Gabe Bywaters | Labor | Murray | 1956–1968 |
| Tom Casey ^{[2]} | Labor | Frome | 1960–1970 |
| John Clark | Labor | Gawler | 1952–1973 |
| Jim Corcoran | Labor | Millicent | 1945–1947, 1953–1962 |
| John Coumbe | LCL | Torrens | 1956–1977 |
| Colin Dunnage | LCL | Unley | 1941–1962 |
| Don Dunstan | Labor | Norwood | 1953–1979 |
| Steele Hall | LCL | Gouger | 1959–1974 |
| George Hambour ^{[1]} | LCL | Light | 1956–1960 |
| Leslie Harding | LCL | Victoria | 1956–1965 |
| James Heaslip | LCL | Rocky River | 1949–1968 |
| Hon Cecil Hincks | LCL | Yorke Peninsula | 1941–1963 |
| Lloyd Hughes | Labor | Wallaroo | 1957–1970 |
| Cyril Hutchens | Labor | Hindmarsh | 1950–1970 |
| William Jenkins | LCL | Stirling | 1952–1963 |
| Joe Jennings | Labor | Enfield | 1953–1977 |
| Harold King | LCL | Chaffey | 1956–1962 |
| Condor Laucke | LCL | Barossa | 1956–1965 |
| Sam Lawn | Labor | Adelaide | 1950–1971 |
| Ron Loveday | Labor | Whyalla | 1956–1970 |
| Dave McKee | Labor | Port Pirie | 1959–1975 |
| Robin Millhouse | LCL | Mitcham | 1955–1982 |
| Bill Nankivell | LCL | Albert | 1959–1979 |
| Leslie Nicholson ^{[1]} | LCL | Light | 1960–1962 |
| Mick O'Halloran ^{[2]} | Labor | Frome | 1918–1921, 1924–1927, 1938–1960 |
| Hon Baden Pattinson | LCL | Glenelg | 1930–1938, 1947–1965 |
| Hon Glen Pearson | LCL | Flinders | 1951–1970 |
| Hon Sir Thomas Playford | LCL | Gumeracha | 1933–1968 |
| Percy Quirke | Independent | Burra | 1941–1968 |
| Ron Ralston | Labor | Mount Gambier | 1958–1962 |
| Lindsay Riches | Labor | Stuart | 1933–1970 |
| John Ryan | Labor | Port Adelaide | 1959–1975 |
| Howard Shannon | LCL | Onkaparinga | 1933–1968 |
| Joyce Steele | LCL | Burnside | 1959–1973 |
| Tom Stott | Independent | Ridley | 1933–1970 |
| Harold Tapping | Labor | Semaphore | 1946–1964 |
| Hon Berthold Teusner | LCL | Angas | 1944–1970 |
| Frank Walsh | Labor | Edwardstown | 1941–1968 |
| Fred Walsh | Labor | West Torrens | 1942–1965 |

^{1} The LCL member for Light, George Hambour, died on 25 March 1960. LCL candidate Leslie Nicholson won the resulting by-election on 23 April.
^{2} The Labor member for Frome and Opposition Leader Mick O'Halloran died on 22 September 1960. Labor candidate Tom Casey won the resulting by-election on 5 November.
