= Playmander =

South Australian gerrymandering system

The Playmander was a pro-rural electoral malapportionment in the Australian state of South Australia, which was introduced by the incumbent Liberal and Country League (LCL) government in 1936, and remained in place for 32 years until 1968.

The term is a portmanteau of Playford and "gerrymander". Unlike in the US, where it originated, the term "gerrymander" was commonly used in Australia to refer to malapportionments, which were common in Australian state electoral systems.

During the Playmander's existence, the South Australian House of Assembly was elected from 39 single-member districts, 26 in the country and 13 in Adelaide. The low-population rural seats held as much as 10 times the voting power of the 13 high-population urban-based seats, even though rural areas contained only a third of South Australia's population by the late 1960s. At the peak of the malapportionment in 1968, the rural seat of Frome had 4,500 formal votes, while the metropolitan seat of Enfield had 42,000 formal votes.

During the Playmander's existence, Labor won enough parliamentary seats to form government only once, in an against the odds win in 1965 that ousted its namesake, Sir Thomas Playford, as Premier after over 26 years in office. The Playmander was strong enough that Labor was denied government despite comprehensive majorities of the statewide two-party vote in 1944, 1953, 1962 and 1968. Labor also won a majority of the primary vote in 1953, 1962 and 1968.

More equitable boundaries were subsequently put in place following the 1968 election, ending the Playmander, and again after the 1975 and 1989 elections.

Eight new seats were introduced in 1970, and seats were required to be proportionate from 1975. A unique fairness clause directs the Electoral Commission of South Australia to redraw boundaries after each election, with the objective being that the party which receives over 50 percent of the statewide two-party vote at the forthcoming election should win the two-party vote in a majority of seats; while this clause was removed from the State constitution in 2017, the Commission still retains it when drawing electoral maps.

One change introduced as part of the Playmander remains to this day: as in the lower houses most Australian jurisdictions, the House of Assembly is still elected using single-member seats. Prior to the Playmander, the House of Assembly had been elected using multi-member seats since the inaugural 1857 election.

== Etymology ==
The word Playmander is a portmanteau word derived from the name of long-serving Premier, Sir Thomas Playford, and the political term gerrymander, and was coined around 1971 by political scientists Neal Blewett and Dean Jaensch of Flinders University. Unlike in the US, where it originated, the term "gerrymander" was commonly used in Australia to refer to malapportionments, which were common in Australian state electoral systems.

== Playmander years ==
A map of South Australian electorates from 1955 to 1969, during the height of the Playmander.

When South Australia first gained responsible government in 1856, its constitution required that there be two country seats for every one seat in Adelaide and its suburbs; thus, rural overweighting was written into the State's constitution.

With the merger of the Liberal Federation and the Country Party in 1932 to form the Liberal and Country League, the Country Party had demanded key concessions as part of the deal, particularly to the electoral system. The already entrenched rural overweighting was increased to the constitutional 2:1 ratio, the number of MPs was reduced to 39, and the multi-member seats were abandoned in favour of single-member seats, with 13 in Adelaide and 26 in rural South Australia. The changes were intended to effectively lock Labor out of power, and there was much uproar when it was brought in: Labor MP Tom Howard declared in Parliament that "the working class will not lay down like tame dogs under a system that will not give them proper representation".

The electoral system contributed to Playford achieving a then-world record for a democratically elected leader, as he spent 26 years as Premier of South Australia. During this period, as a result of population changes, the rural overweighting allowed Playford to retain power even when the LCL lost by decisive margins in actual votes: in 1944 and 1953, for instance, Labor won 53 percent of the two-party vote to the LCL's 47 percent, a margin that in the other states of Australia (with fairer electoral systems) would have seen the Labor leaders (Robert Richards in 1944 and Mick O'Halloran in 1953) defeat Playford's LCL government in a landslide. However, with the Playmander, the LCL was still able to eke out a paper-thin majority in both elections.

This was because rural areas, excepting industrial towns such as Whyalla, Port Augusta and Port Pirie, were likely to support the LCL, while Adelaide and its suburbs were overwhelmingly Labor; even at the height of Playford's popularity, the LCL only had a realistic prospect of winning seats in the wealthy eastern suburbs and around Holdfast Bay.

By the early 1960s, the rural-to-urban ratio had been almost completely reversed from 1856; around two-thirds of the state's population lived in the Adelaide urban area, meaning the rural overweighting effectively resulted in a rural vote being worth at least double a vote in Adelaide. In one of the more extreme cases mentioned above, a vote in the rural seat of Frome was effectively worth ten times a vote in the urban seat of Enfield.

The term "Playmander" was adopted by the Adelaide press, including the articulate young Labor member Don Dunstan. Dunstan, more than anyone else, was the driving force behind Labor both overcoming the Playmander and extensive changes being made to the electoral system; the latter, however, would not be implemented by Dunstan.

By the 1950s, O'Halloran and other Labor figures had despaired of ever defeating Playford and winning power. They found themselves having to rely on Playford to get favourable legislation passed. This attitude changed when Frank Walsh became state Labor leader in 1960 upon O'Halloran's death. Walsh knew a conventional statewide campaign was not realistic due to the significant rural overweighting, and opted instead to target the LCL's marginal seats in the 1962 election. By then, the LCL's grip on power had become increasingly tenuous; due to being almost entirely dependent on rural support, the LCL usually won just enough seats to govern alone, and in fact it never held more than 23 seats (three more than necessary to govern) during Playford's tenure. By the time the writs were dropped for the election, the LCL only had a bare majority of 20 seats, and had also lost seats at every election since 1950.

At the election, Labor won 54.3 percent of the two-party vote, even higher than in 1944 and 1953. In a fairer system, this would have been enough to give Walsh a strong majority government. However, the rural weighting was strong enough to hold Labor to a two-seat swing, one short of what was required to make Walsh Premier. The balance of power rested with two independents, who supported Playford, thus allowing him to continue in office with a bare one-seat majority. This illustrated just how distorted the Playmander had become: the LCL was in a position to govern despite winning only 45.7 percent of the two-party vote.

The Playmander was eventually beaten at the 1965 election, when Labor gained power for the first time since 1933. While the two-party vote remained at 54.3 percent, the rural overweighting was strong enough that Labor won 21 seats, a mere two-seat majority. Walsh retired in late 1967 and was succeeded by Dunstan, who led Labor into the 1968 election.

While Labor won 53.2 percent of the two-party vote at that election, it lost two seats, resulting in a hung parliament. After much negotiation, independent Tom Stott threw his support to the LCL, thus making LCL leader Steele Hall the new Premier, despite the LCL winning only 46.8 percent of the two-party vote. Further underscoring this, the LCL had won only three metropolitan seats in 1965 and 1968: Burnside, Mitcham and Torrens.

Hall was embarrassed that the LCL was even in a position to govern, despite having been convincingly defeated in terms of actual votes. The outcry over the result led Hall to institute electoral reform in 1968: the House was expanded to 47 seats, with 28 in Adelaide and 19 in rural areas, which more than doubled the number of metropolitan seats and reduced the number of rural seats.

It still fell short of "one vote one value", as Labor had demanded, since rural areas were still over-represented, albeit by only 10%; Adelaide had 60% of the seats, whereas it accounted for two-thirds of the state's population, though the most populous metropolitan seats still contained double the number of voters than the least populous rural seats.

However, Adelaide elected a majority of the Parliament for the first time in the State's history: given Labor's dominance in Adelaide since the 1930s, the conventional wisdom was that Hall knew that he was effectively conceding defeat to Dunstan at the next election. When a snap election was called in 1970, Labor gained power as expected, with 53.3 percent of the two-party vote, sweeping the eight newly created seats.

== Post-Playmander years ==
In 1973, Labor retained office with 54.5 percent of the two-party vote, and the LCL became the South Australian division of the Liberal Party of Australia in 1974. Labor retained power in 1975 with a majority of seats but lost the two-party vote on 49.2 percent. Dunstan then instituted "one vote one value" electoral reform, which meant that all seats had to contain approximately the same number of enrolled voters; and created an independent body, the South Australian Electoral Districts Boundaries Commission, to draw the electoral boundaries.

After John Bannon won in 1989 even after losing the two-party vote at 48 percent, a 1991 referendum was passed which added a "fairness clause" to electoral legislation, requiring the commission to redistribute seats with a view toward ensuring that party which receives a majority of the statewide two-party vote at the forthcoming election should win the two-party vote (in terms of "traditional" two-party matchups between Labor and the Liberals) in a majority of seats.

Despite this 1991 change, Labor has won a further three elections (2002, 2010 and 2014) with less than 50% of the two party preferred vote; though in 2002 this was due to the support of independents (and also initially in 2014, until Labor's Nat Cook won the 2014 Fisher by-election soon after). Prior to the 2018 election, at which the Liberals won a majority, Labor had been in office for all but 12 years since 1970, the Liberals having only governed from 1979–1982 and 1993–2002.

Since the end of the Playmander, South Australian politics have been characterised by a concentration of seats in the Adelaide metropolitan area, a manifestation of South Australia's status as the nation's most centralised state. Successive redistributions have resulted in Adelaide and its suburbs containing close to three-quarters of the seats (34 out of 47 in 2017). This makes it difficult to form even a minority government without gaining significant ground in Adelaide. Labor's success in South Australia over the last four decades has been built on a strong base in Adelaide; under normal conditions Labor wins the most seats in the capital. Since the 1975 redistribution, most of the Liberal margin has been locked into ultra-safe rural seats. This remained the case even after the "fairness clause" amendment.

In 1979, for instance, the Liberals won 55 percent of the two-party vote–the first time in 20 years that the non-Labor side in South Australia had won a majority of the two-party vote while also winning the most seats. However, they only won 25 seats—a bare majority of two—mainly due to winning only 13 seats in Adelaide. That narrow majority was reduced even further to 24 seats after the Liberal victory in Dunstan's old seat was overturned, and Labor won the ensuing by-election. Thus, despite having won by a margin large enough for a landslide victory in the rest of Australia, the Liberals only governed on a knife-edge.

In 1989, 2010 and 2014, the Liberals won a narrow majority of the two-party vote. However, the Liberals fell short of winning government in all three elections because most of their majorities were wasted on massive landslides in their rural heartland. The only comprehensive Liberal victory, in terms of both two-party vote and seat count, came in 1993, when the Liberals won 61 percent of the two-party vote and all but nine seats in Adelaide en route to the biggest majority government in the state's history.

The 2010 and 2014 elections illustrated how difficult it is to form government in South Australia without a strong showing in Adelaide. In 2010, the Liberals picked up a swing of 8.4 percent, more than the uniform 6.9 percent swing that the Boundaries Commission envisaged as being enough for a Liberal win. However, most of that swing came in seats that would have stayed in Labor hands in any event; while 22 seats saw double-digit swings, Labor sat on insurmountably safe margins in 16 of them. Additionally, while the Liberals took three Adelaide-area seats off Labor, they only won six additional seats in the capital. While six of the Liberals' 13 safe two-party seats were in Adelaide, all but one of their four marginal seats were urban. As a result, while the Liberals won 51.6 percent of the two-party vote, Labor was still able to eke out a two-seat majority.

In 2014, the Liberals won 53 percent of the two-party vote to Labor's 47 percent. However, in Adelaide, Labor won 51.5 percent of the two-party vote to the Liberals' 48.5 percent. The Liberals only won 12 of Adelaide's 34 seats. While only four of their 14 safe two-party seats were located in Adelaide, all eight non-safe (<10 percent) seats were in Adelaide. Overall, the election resulted in a hung parliament with 23 seats for Labor and 22 for the Liberals.

The balance of power rested with the two crossbench independents, Bob Such and Geoff Brock. Such's seat of Fisher and Brock's seat of Frome would have had decisive Liberal majorities in "traditional" two-party matchups in 2014. Counting the seats won by the independents, 24 seats returned Liberal two-party votes and 23 returned Labor two-party votes, so the requirements of the "fairness clause" were met. Such did not indicate who he would support in a minority government before he went on two months' medical leave for a brain tumour which he would die from in the ensuing months. Brock subsequently supported Labor., allowing Labor to form government by one seat. It is the second time that Labor has won four consecutive state elections in South Australia, the first occurred when Dunstan led Labor to four consecutive victories between 1970 and 1977. Labor achieved majority government when Nat Cook won the 2014 Fisher by-election triggered by Such's death.

After 16 years in office–a record for a Labor government in the state–Labor was defeated at the 2018 election by the Liberals under Steven Marshall. Even then, the Liberals suffered a state-wide swing against them and were only able to win 25 seats–as in 1979, a bare majority of two. They did, however, manage to win 16 of the 33 metropolitan seats, their best showing in Adelaide since the 1993 landslide–thus proving that it is very difficult to win even a minority government without a strong showing in Adelaide. The Liberals were thrown from office in a massive swing in 2022 after seven of their metropolitan seats fell to Labor under Peter Malinauskas. Four years later, the Liberals were reduced to their smallest-ever presence in the House of Assembly, a rump of five seats, after only winning two seats in the capital.

One element of the Playmander still exists to this day – the existence of single-member seats. Each Labor period of government since the end of the Playmander had at least one comprehensive win (1977, 1985, 2006, 2022 and 2026) allowing often-Liberal seats to be won by Labor candidates who then built up incumbency and personal popularity. Examples in 2014 were Mawson, Newland and Light, and additionally in 2010, Bright and Hartley – all gained at the 2006 election landslide. Mawson in fact swung toward Labor in 2010, 2014 and 2018 despite the statewide trend. The bellwether seat of Colton was retained by Labor. Furthermore, metropolitan Liberal seats and polling places had single and double digit swings against them. By comparison, as mentioned above, there has been only one comprehensive Liberal win since the end of the Playmander, in 1993.

In 2014, referring to the 1989 fairness legislation, Weatherill responded to Liberal complaints about the fairness clause by saying, "Complaining about the rules when you designed the rules I think sits ill on the mouth of the Liberal Party." Electoral Commissioner Kay Mousley said it was an "impossible" task for the Boundaries Commission to achieve the legislated requirement, stating "It is a constitutional requirement, and until the constitution gets changed, I must say I find it a very inexact science". Additionally, she had previously stated in 2010, "Had the Liberal Party achieved a uniform swing it would have formed Government. The Commission has no control over, and can accept no responsibility for, the quality of the candidates, policies and campaigns." University of Adelaide Professor of Politics Clem Macintyre stated after the 2014 election that fair electoral boundaries are an "impossible challenge".

== Results 1933–1973 ==
The LCL was formed in 1932, being rebranded as the Liberal Party in 1974, while the Playmander began in 1936 and was abolished in 1968. Two-party-preferred (2PP) figures are not available prior to 1944.

Results 1933–1973
% (seats)	ALP	LCL	IND	OTH	ALP 2PP	LCL 2PP
1973	51.52 (26)	39.79 (20)	4.32	4.37 (1)	54.5	45.5
1970	51.64 (27)	43.76 (20)	1.46	3.14	53.3	46.7
1968	51.98 (19)	43.82 (19)	1.03 (1)	3.18	53.2	46.8
1965	55.04 (21)	35.93 (17)	1.88 (1)	7.16	54.3	45.7
1962	53.98 (19)	34.51 (18)	3.15 (2)	8.37	54.3	45.7
1959	49.35 (17)	36.95 (20)	5.93 (2)	7.77	49.7	50.3
1956	47.37 (15)	36.69 (21)	7.34 (3)	8.60	48.7	51.3
1953	50.84 (14)	36.45 (21)	11.10 (4)	1.60	53.0	47.0
1950	48.09 (12)	40.51 (23)	10.07 (4)	1.34	48.7	51.3
1947	48.64 (13)	40.38 (23)	6.20 (3)	4.77	48.0	52.0
1944	42.52 (16)	45.84 (20)	6.64 (3)	5.00	53.3	46.7
1941	33.25 (11)	37.55 (20)	29.20 (8)	0.00
1938	26.16 (9)	33.44 (15)	39.73 (14)	0.66 (1)
1933	27.78 (6)	34.62 (29)	13.41 (3)	24.19 (8)
Primary source: WA Uni – TPP sources: ABC and Professional Historians

== Labor's winning pendulum ==
Labor's statewide two-party-preferred vote at the 1965 election remained unchanged at 54.3 percent, barely winning for the first and only time during the 32-year Playmander, with just a two-seat majority government. Labor won the seats of Glenelg and Barossa at the 1965 election, after winning the seats of Chaffey and Unley at the 1962 election. At the 1968 election the LCL won the seats of Murray and Chaffey and formed a one-seat minority government. If just 21 LCL votes were Labor votes in Murray in 1968, Labor would have retained its majority.

The LCL won only three metropolitan seats in 1965 and 1968 – Burnside, Mitcham and Torrens. The most populous metropolitan seats (13) had as much as 5-10 times the number of voters than the least populous rural seats (26), despite around two-thirds of the population located in the metropolitan area − at the 1968 election the rural seat of Frome had 4,500 formal votes, while the metropolitan seat of Enfield had 42,000 formal votes.

Enlarged from 39 to 47 prior to the 1970 election, the House was also redistributed to comprise 28 metropolitan seats and 19 rural seats, an increase of 15 metropolitan seats, more than double. At the 1965 election Labor held eleven of 26 rural seats, by the 1977 election Labor held just two of 14 rural seats. Since the 1985 election there have been 34 metropolitan seats and 13 rural seats. On the below boundaries, with voting patterns from either the Labor landslide at the 2006 election, or the more balanced result at the 2014 election, Labor would regardless hold about just ten of 39 seats.

LABOR SEATS (21)
Marginal
Chaffey	Reg Curren	ALP	0.7%
Unley	Gil Langley	ALP	1.6%
Glenelg	Hugh Hudson	ALP	2.1%
Barossa	Molly Byrne	ALP	2.3%
Fairly safe
West Torrens	Glen Broomhill	ALP	6.8%
Norwood	Don Dunstan	ALP	7.6%
Frome	Tom Casey	ALP	8.3%
Wallaroo	Lloyd Hughes	ALP	9.1%
Safe
Mount Gambier	Allan Burdon	ALP	10.6%
Edwardstown	Frank Walsh	ALP	11.8%
Millicent	Des Corcoran	ALP	11.8%
Enfield	Jack Jennings	ALP	17.0%
Murray	Gabe Bywaters	ALP	17.1%
Gawler	John Clark	ALP	19.7%
Adelaide	Sam Lawn	ALP	28.2% v DLP
Hindmarsh	Cyril Hutchens	ALP	30.1% v DLP
Port Adelaide	John Ryan	ALP	30.6% v DLP
Semaphore	Reg Hurst	ALP	32.5% v DLP
Whyalla	Ron Loveday	ALP	34.4% v DLP
Stuart	Lindsay Riches	ALP	37.7% v IND
Port Pirie	Dave McKee	ALP	39.4% v IND

LCL SEATS (17)
Marginal
Torrens	John Coumbe	LCL	4.1%
Fairly Safe
Alexandra	David Brookman	LCL	7.7%
Victoria	Allan Rodda	LCL	8.3%
Onkaparinga	Howard Shannon	LCL	9.1%
Flinders	Glen Pearson	LCL	9.9%
Safe
Eyre	George Bockelberg	LCL	10.2%
Burnside	Joyce Steele	LCL	12.2%
Burra	Percy Quirke	LCL	12.3%
Gouger	Steele Hall	LCL	13.5%
Mitcham	Robin Millhouse	LCL	16.6%
Rocky River	James Heaslip	LCL	16.6%
Yorke Peninsula	James Ferguson	LCL	19.5%
Stirling	William McAnaney	LCL	20.9%
Gumeracha	Thomas Playford	LCL	23.1%
Albert	Bill Nankivell	LCL	unopposed
Angas	Berthold Teusner	LCL	unopposed
Light	John Freebairn	LCL	unopposed
CROSSBENCH SEATS (1)
Ridley	Tom Stott	IND	16.9% v ALP

== See also ==
- Bjelkemander, a similar malapportionment in Queensland, named after Joh Bjelke-Petersen. (1970s-1980s)

== Bibliography ==
- Blewett, Neal (1971). Playford to Dunstan: The Politics of Transition. Griffin Press Limited. ISBN 0-7015-1299-7.
- Dunstan, Don (1976). "John Curtin Memorial Lecture: Electoral reform in South Australia" (PDF).
- Dunstan, Don (1981). Felicia: The Political Memoirs of Don Dunstan. Griffin Press Limited. ISBN 0-333-33815-4.
- Crocker, Walter (1983). Sir Thomas Playford: A Portrait. Melbourne University Press. ISBN 0-522-84250-X.
- Cockburn, Stewart (1991). Playford: Benevolent Despot. Griffin Press Limited. ISBN 0-9594164-4-7.
- Jaensch, Dean. (2006) When the state voting system defies all logic, The Advertiser, p18, 26 April 2006.
