= First Dunstan ministry (South Australia) =

61st ministry of the Government of South Australia

- 61st ministry of South Australia

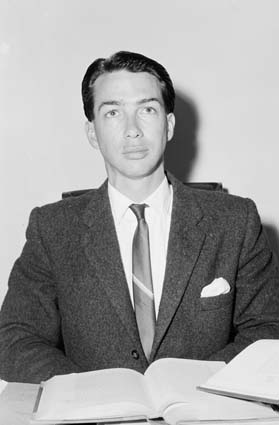
- Don Dunstan in 1963
- Date formed: 1 June 1967
- Date dissolved: 16 April 1968; 320 days

People and organisations
- Monarch: Queen Elizabeth II
- Governor: Edric Bastyan
- Premier: Don Dunstan
- Deputy Premier: Des Corcoran
- No. of ministers: 9
- Member party: Labor
- Status in legislature: Majority government
- Opposition cabinet: Hall shadow ministry
- Opposition party: Liberal and Country
- Opposition leader: Steele Hall

History
- Legislature term: 38th
- Predecessor: Walsh ministry
- Successor: Hall ministry

The first Dunstan ministry was the 61st ministry of the Government of South Australia, led by the state's 35th premier Don Dunstan. Dunstan assumed the premiership in June 1967 after Frank Walsh resigned due to ill-health. Dunstan's Labor government stood for a year before being defeated at the 1968 election. Dunstan's second ministry began in June 1970 after winning the 1970 election, which stood for almost nine years.

== Final arrangement (1968) ==
The ministry was reshuffled on 26 March 1968 after the resignations of Frank Walsh and Gabe Bywaters, who were replaced by Tom Casey and Hugh Hudson.

Des Corcoran assumed the deputy premiership. Casey became Minister of Agriculture and Minister of Forests, the same portfolios formerly held by Bywaters. Hudson became Minister of Housing and Minister of Social Welfare, previously held by Dunstan and Walsh respectively.

Party	Minister	Portrait	Offices
Labor	Don Dunstan (1926–1999) MHA for Norwood (1953–1979)		Premier; Treasurer; Attorney-General
Labor	Cyril Hutchens (1904–1982) MHA for Hindmarsh (1950–1970)		Minister of Works; Minister of Marine
Labor	Ron Loveday (1900–1987) MHA for Whyalla (1956–1970)		Minister of Education; Minister of Aboriginal Affairs
Labor	Des Corcoran (1928–2004) MHA for Millicent (1956–1975)		Deputy Premier; Minister of Lands; Minister of Repatriation; Minister of Irrigation; Minister of Immigration and Tourism
Labor	Bert Shard (1902–1991) MLC for Central District No. 1 (1956–1975)		Chief Secretary; Minister of Health
Labor	Stan Bevan (1901–1987) MLC for Central District No. 1 (1951–1970)		Minister of Local Government; Minister of Roads; Minister of Mines
Labor	Frank Kneebone (1905–2004) MLC for Central District No. 1 (1961–1975)		Minister of Labour and Industry; Minister of Transport
Labor	Tom Casey (1921–2003) MHA for Frome (1960–1970)		Minister of Agriculture; Minister of Forests
Labor	Hugh Hudson (1930–1993) MHA for Glenelg (1965–1970)		Minister of Housing; Minister of Social Welfare

== First arrangement (1967–1968) ==
The ministry was formed on 1 June 1967.

Party	Minister	Portrait	Offices
Labor	Don Dunstan (1926–1999) MHA for Norwood (1953–1979)		Premier; Treasurer; Attorney-General; Minister of Housing
Labor	Cyril Hutchens (1904–1982) MHA for Hindmarsh (1950–1970)		Minister of Works; Minister of Marine
Labor	Frank Walsh (1897–1968) MHA for Edwardstown (1956–1968)		Minister of Social Welfare
Labor	Ron Loveday (1900–1987) MHA for Whyalla (1956–1970)		Minister of Education; Minister of Aboriginal Affairs
Labor	Gabe Bywaters (1914–2004) MHA for Murray (1956–1968)		Minister of Agriculture; Minister of Forests
Labor	Des Corcoran (1928–2004) MHA for Millicent (1956–1975)		Minister of Lands; Minister of Repatriation; Minister of Irrigation; Minister of Immigration (until 27 July 1967); Minister of Immigration and Tourism (from 27 July 1967)
Labor	Bert Shard (1902–1991) MLC for Central District No. 1 (1956–1975)		Chief Secretary; Minister of Health
Labor	Stan Bevan (1901–1987) MLC for Central District No. 1 (1951–1970)		Minister of Local Government; Minister of Roads; Minister of Mines
Labor	Frank Kneebone (1905–2004) MLC for Central District No. 1 (1961–1975)		Minister of Labour and Industry; Minister of Transport
