= Hall ministry =

62nd ministry of government of South Australia

- 62nd ministry of South Australia

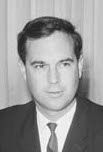
- Steele Hall
- Date formed: 17 April 1968
- Date dissolved: 2 June 1970

People and organisations
- Monarch: Elizabeth II
- Governor: Edric Bastyan; James Harrison
- Premier: Steele Hall
- No. of ministers: 9
- Member party: Liberal and Country League
- Status in legislature: Minority government
- Opposition party: Labor
- Opposition leader: Don Dunstan

History
- Election: 2 March 1968
- Outgoing election: 30 May 1970
- Predecessor: First Dunstan ministry
- Successor: Second Dunstan ministry

The Hall ministry was a ministry of the Government of South Australia, led by Liberal and Country League Premier Steele Hall. It succeeded the first Dunstan ministry on 17 April 1968, when Labor Premier Don Dunstan lost a motion of no confidence in the House of Assembly following the 1968 election on 2 March. It was in turn succeeded by the second Dunstan ministry on 2 June 1970 following the LCL government's defeat at the 1970 election.

== The ministry ==
The ministry was sworn in by Governor Edric Bastyan on 17 April 1968.

On 2 March 1970, Glen Pearson resigned from the ministry ahead of his retirement from Parliament. A minor reshuffle took place.

The ministers listed served, except where indicated, until the end of the ministry on 2 June 1970.

Office	Minister
Premier; Minister of Industrial Development; Treasurer (from 2 March 1970)	Steele Hall
Deputy Premier; Chief Secretary; Minister of Health; Minister of Mines	Ren DeGaris, MLC
Treasurer; Minister of Housing	Sir Glen Pearson, MHA (until 2 March 1970)
Minister of Lands; Minister of Repatriation; Minister of Irrigation; Minister of Immigration and Tourism	David Brookman, RDA, MHR
Minister of Agriculture; Minister of Forests	Ross Story, MLC
Until 2 March 1970: Minister of Works Minister of Marine Minister of Labour and Industry Minister of Education (from 2 March 1970)	John Coumbe, MHR
Attorney-General; Minister of Social Welfare (until 2 March 1970); Minister of Aboriginal Affairs (until 2 March 1970); Minister of Labour and Industry (from 2 March 1970)	Robin Millhouse, LL.B., MLA
Minister of Education (until 2 March 1970); From 2 March 1970: Minister of Social Welfare Minister of Aboriginal Affairs Minister of Housing	Joyce Steele, MHA
Minister of Local Government; Minister of Roads; Minister of Transport	Murray Hill, MLC
Minister of Works; Minister of Marine	William Rodda (from 2 March 1970)
