= Central District No. 1 (South Australian Legislative Council) =

Former South Australian Legislative Council district

Coordinates: 34°54′28″S 138°36′5″E

Central District No. 1 was an electoral district for the South Australian Legislative Council from 1913 until 1975. It was created by the Constitution Act Further Amendment Act 1913, which divided the Central District into two districts, each to elect four members. The size of the Legislative Council was to remain at 18 until the next general election, and increase to 20 by adding a new member for each of the two new districts. From its creation until the next general election (which was held on 27 March 1915), Central District No. 1 comprised the extant Assembly districts of Adelaide and Port Adelaide. The act also redrew the Assembly electoral districts from the next election. From then, Central District No. 1 would comprise the new Assembly districts of Adelaide, North Adelaide, Port Adelaide and West Torrens.

== Members ==
The Constitution Act Further Amendment Act provided that the six sitting members for Central District should decide amongst themselves which three represented each of the two new districts. The three who represented Central District No. 1 were James Jelley, John Vaughan and James Phillips Wilson.

Date of change	Member	Member	member	Member
At formation (three members)	James Phillips Wilson	John Vaughan	James Jelley (re-elected 1921, 1927)	
12 March 1915	James Phillips Wilson	John Vaughan	James Jelley (re-elected 1921, 1927)	John Carr (re-elected 1921, 1927)
6 April 1918	Andrew Alexander Kirkpatrick (re-elected 1924)	Thomas Gluyas (re-elected 1924, 1930)	James Jelley (re-elected 1921, 1927)	John Carr (re-elected 1921, 1927)
9 and 16 April 1921	Andrew Alexander Kirkpatrick (re-elected 1924)	Thomas Gluyas (re-elected 1924, 1930)	James Jelley (re-elected 1921, 1927)	John Carr (re-elected 1921, 1927)
5 April 1924	Andrew Alexander Kirkpatrick (re-elected 1924)	Thomas Gluyas (re-elected 1924, 1930)	James Jelley (re-elected 1921, 1927)	John Carr (re-elected 1921, 1927)
26 March 1927	Andrew Alexander Kirkpatrick (re-elected 1924)	Thomas Gluyas (re-elected 1924, 1930)	James Jelley (re-elected 1921, 1927)	John Carr (re-elected 1921, 1927)
27 October 1928	Frank Condon (re-elected 1930, 1938, 1944, 1950, 1956)	Thomas Gluyas (re-elected 1924, 1930)	James Jelley (re-elected 1921, 1927)	John Carr (re-elected 1921, 1927)
17 August 1929	Frank Condon (re-elected 1930, 1938, 1944, 1950, 1956)	Thomas Gluyas (re-elected 1924, 1930)	James Jelley (re-elected 1921, 1927)	Stanley Whitford (re-elected 1933)
5 April 1930	Frank Condon (re-elected 1930, 1938, 1944, 1950, 1956)	Thomas Gluyas (re-elected 1924, 1930)	James Jelley (re-elected 1921, 1927)	Stanley Whitford (re-elected 1933)
24 October 1931	Frank Condon (re-elected 1930, 1938, 1944, 1950, 1956)	Joseph Anderson (re-elected 1938)	James Jelley (re-elected 1921, 1927)	Stanley Whitford (re-elected 1933)
8 April 1933	Frank Condon (re-elected 1930, 1938, 1944, 1950, 1956)	Joseph Anderson (re-elected 1938)	Edgar Alfred Oates (re-elected 1941, 1947)	Stanley Whitford (re-elected 1933)
19 March 1938	Frank Condon (re-elected 1930, 1938, 1944, 1950, 1956)	Joseph Anderson (re-elected 1938)	Edgar Alfred Oates (re-elected 1941, 1947)	Stanley Whitford (re-elected 1933)
29 March 1941	Frank Condon (re-elected 1930, 1938, 1944, 1950, 1956)	Joseph Anderson (re-elected 1938)	Edgar Alfred Oates (re-elected 1941, 1947)	Kenneth Edward Joseph Bardolph (re-elected 1947, 1953, 1959)
29 April 1944	Frank Condon (re-elected 1930, 1938, 1944, 1950, 1956)	Albert Alfred Hoare (re-elected 1950)	Edgar Alfred Oates (re-elected 1941, 1947)	Kenneth Edward Joseph Bardolph (re-elected 1947, 1953, 1959)
8 March 1947	Frank Condon (re-elected 1930, 1938, 1944, 1950, 1956)	Albert Alfred Hoare (re-elected 1950)	Edgar Alfred Oates (re-elected 1941, 1947)	Kenneth Edward Joseph Bardolph (re-elected 1947, 1953, 1959)
4 March 1950	Frank Condon (re-elected 1930, 1938, 1944, 1950, 1956)	Albert Alfred Hoare (re-elected 1950)	Edgar Alfred Oates (re-elected 1941, 1947)	Kenneth Edward Joseph Bardolph (re-elected 1947, 1953, 1959)
24 October 1951	Frank Condon (re-elected 1930, 1938, 1944, 1950, 1956)	Albert Alfred Hoare (re-elected 1950)	Stan Bevan (re-elected 1953, 1959, 1965)	Kenneth Edward Joseph Bardolph (re-elected 1947, 1953, 1959)
7 March 1953	Frank Condon (re-elected 1930, 1938, 1944, 1950, 1956)	Albert Alfred Hoare (re-elected 1950)	Stan Bevan (re-elected 1953, 1959, 1965)	Kenneth Edward Joseph Bardolph (re-elected 1947, 1953, 1959)
3 March 1956	Frank Condon (re-elected 1930, 1938, 1944, 1950, 1956)	Albert James Shard (re-elected 1962, 1968)	Stan Bevan (re-elected 1953, 1959, 1965)	Kenneth Edward Joseph Bardolph (re-elected 1947, 1953, 1959)
7 March 1959	Frank Condon (re-elected 1930, 1938, 1944, 1950, 1956)	Albert James Shard (re-elected 1962, 1968)	Stan Bevan (re-elected 1953, 1959, 1965)	Kenneth Edward Joseph Bardolph (re-elected 1947, 1953, 1959)
16 September 1961	Frank Kneebone (re-elected 1962, 1968)	Albert James Shard (re-elected 1962, 1968)	Stan Bevan (re-elected 1953, 1959, 1965)	Kenneth Edward Joseph Bardolph (re-elected 1947, 1953, 1959)
3 March 1962	Frank Kneebone (re-elected 1962, 1968)	Albert James Shard (re-elected 1962, 1968)	Stan Bevan (re-elected 1953, 1959, 1965)	Kenneth Edward Joseph Bardolph (re-elected 1947, 1953, 1959)
6 March 1965	Frank Kneebone (re-elected 1962, 1968)	Albert James Shard (re-elected 1962, 1968)	Stan Bevan (re-elected 1953, 1959, 1965)	Donald Hubert Louis Banfield (re-elected 1973)
2 March 1968	Frank Kneebone (re-elected 1962, 1968)	Albert James Shard (re-elected 1962, 1968)	Stan Bevan (re-elected 1953, 1959, 1965)	Donald Hubert Louis Banfield (re-elected 1973)
15 May 1970	Frank Kneebone (re-elected 1962, 1968)	Albert James Shard (re-elected 1962, 1968)	Tom Casey (re-elected 1973)	Donald Hubert Louis Banfield (re-elected 1973)
10 March 1973	Frank Kneebone (re-elected 1962, 1968)	Albert James Shard (re-elected 1962, 1968)	Tom Casey (re-elected 1973)	Donald Hubert Louis Banfield (re-elected 1973)
