= Ron Ralston =

Australian politician

Ronald Frederick Ralston (7 January 1903 – 30 October 1962) was an Australian politician who represented the South Australian House of Assembly seat of Mount Gambier from 1958 to 1962 for the Labor Party.
