= Ernest Allen (Australian politician) =

Australian politician

Ernest Claude Allen (24 October 1910 – 8 June 1984) was an Australian politician who represented the South Australian House of Assembly seats of Burra from 1968 to 1970 and Frome from 1970 to 1977 for the Liberal and Country League and Liberal Party.

Allen was previously chairman of the District Council of Spalding from 1956 to 1964.

Parliament of South Australia
Preceded by Percy Quirke	Member of the House of Assembly for Burra; 1968–1970	District abolished
Preceded by Tom Casey	Member of the House of Assembly for Frome; 1970–1977	District abolished
