= Allan Rodda =

Australian politician

William Allan Rodda (8 September 1917 – 27 May 2010) was an Australian politician who represented the South Australian House of Assembly seat of Victoria for the Liberal and Country League and Liberal Party from 1965 to 1985.

Rodda was born in Tumby Bay. He served as a bomber pilot with the Royal Australian Air Force during World War II. Upon his return, he took a position administering the soldier settlement scheme at Penola, and later became a sheep farmer at Naracoorte. He was elected to the House of Assembly at the 1965 election, and promoted to Cabinet in the last months of the Hall ministry in 1970. He again served in Cabinet when his party regained power in 1979 under David Tonkin, most notably as Chief Secretary, which included responsibilities for police and prisons. His ministerial term saw him deal with a number of controversial issues, including introduction of random breath testing for South Australian drivers, changes to the operation of prisons in the state, and public concern around police corruption. He resigned from the ministry in 1982 and retired from parliament in 1985.

Political offices
Preceded by John Coumbe	Minister for Works; 1970	Succeeded by Des Corcoran
Preceded by John Coumbe	Minister for Marine; 1970	Succeeded by Des Corcoran
Preceded by Don Simmons	Chief Secretary; 1979–1982	Succeeded by John Olsen
Preceded by Brian Chatterton	Minister for Fisheries; 1979–1982	Succeeded by John Olsen
Preceded by Geoff Virgo	Minister for Marine; 1979–1982	Succeeded by Michael Wilson
Parliament of South Australia
Preceded by Leslie Harding	Member for Victoria; 1965–1985	Succeeded by Dale Baker
