= John Freebairn =

Australian politician

John Sydney Freebairn (31 July 1930 – 5 January 2016) was an Australian politician. He was the Liberal and Country League member for Light in the South Australian House of Assembly from 1962 to 1970. In 1974 he contested the federal seat of Wakefield for Steele Hall's breakaway party the Liberal Movement.
