= Glen Pearson (Australian politician) =

Australian politician

The Honourable Sir Glen Person

Deputy Leader of the Liberal and Country League
- In office 15 March 1965 – 2 June 1970
- Leader: Bruce Eastick
- Preceded by: office established
- Succeeded by: Robin Millhouse

Minister of Aboriginal Affairs
- In office 28 February 1963 – 10 March 1965
- Preceded by: office established
- Succeeded by: Don Dunstan

Minister of Works
- In office 25 June 1958 – 10 March 1965
- Preceded by: Sir Malcolm McIntosh
- Succeeded by: Cyril Hutchens

Member for Flinders
- In office 2 June 1951 – 1 May 1970
- Preceded by: Rex Pearson
- Succeeded by: John Carnie

Personal details
- Born: Glen Pearson; 19 February 1907 Wallaroo, South Australia
- Died: 30 November 1976 (aged 68) Cummins, South Australia
- Party: Liberal & Country

Sir Glen Gardner Pearson (19 February 1907 – 30 November 1976) was an Australian politician who represented the South Australian House of Assembly seat of Flinders from 1951 to 1970 for the Liberal and Country League. He served as Treasurer of South Australia from 1968 to 1970.

Political offices
Preceded by Thomas Playford IV	Minister for Agriculture; 1956–1958	Succeeded by David Brookman
Preceded by Thomas Playford IV	Minister for Forests; 1956–1958	Succeeded by David Brookman
Preceded by Colin Rowe	Minister for Works; 1958–1965	Succeeded by Cyril Hutchens
Preceded by Colin Rowe	Minister for Marine; 1958–1965	Succeeded by Cyril Hutchens
New title	Minister for Aboriginal Affairs; 1963–1965	Succeeded by Don Dunstan
Preceded by Don Dunstan	Treasurer; 1968–1970	Succeeded by Steele Hall
Preceded by Hugh Hudson	Minister for Housing; 1968–1970	Succeeded by Joyce Steele
Parliament of South Australia
Preceded by Rex Pearson	Member for Flinders; 1951–1970	Succeeded by John Carnie
