= Electoral district of Burnside =

Former electoral district in South Australia

Coordinates: 34°56′20″S 138°39′58″E

Burnside South Australia—House of Assembly
- State: South Australia
- Created: 1938
- Abolished: 1970
- Namesake: Burnside, South Australia
- Demographic: Metropolitan

Burnside was an electoral district of the House of Assembly in the Australian state of South Australia from 1938 to 1970. Before 1938, the Burnside area was represented by the three-seat multi-member electorate of Sturt. It was abolished in the 1970 parliamentary reforms, and was replaced with Bragg.

Burnside was one of just three metropolitan seats (with Mitcham and Torrens) won by the Liberal and Country League in 1965 and 1968.

== Members ==
Member	Party	Term
Charles Abbott	Liberal and Country	1938–1946
Geoffrey Clarke	Liberal and Country	1946–1959
Joyce Steele	Liberal and Country	1959–1970
