= Lloyd Hughes (politician) =

Australian politician

Lloyd Clarence Hughes (15 October 1912 – 11 May 1994) was an Australian politician who represented the South Australian House of Assembly seat of Wallaroo from 1957 to 1970 for the Labor Party.

Hughes was born at Wallaroo and was a chemical worker with Wallaroo-Mount Lyell Fertilizers Ltd before entering politics. He was a Corporate Town of Wallaroo councillor for six years, including a stint as deputy mayor, and was variously president and secretary of the local committee of the Australian Workers' Union. In 1974, he published a local history book, Wallaroo 1874-1974.

He married Lorna G. Lamshed in 1937, together they had three children; Philip, Desmond, and Trevor.
