= Ron Loveday =

Australian politician

The Honourable Ron Loveday

Minister of Education
- In office 10 March 1965 – 16 April 1968
- Premier: Frank Walsh; Don Dunstan
- Preceded by: Baden Pattinson
- Succeeded by: Joyce Steele

Minister for Aboriginal Affairs and Housing
- In office 1 June 1967 – 16 April 1968
- Premier: Don Dunstan
- Preceded by: Glen Pearson
- Succeeded by: Joyce Steele

Member for Whyalla
- In office 3 March 1956 – 30 May 1970
- Preceded by: district created
- Succeeded by: Max Brown

Personal details
- Born: Ronald Redvers Loveday; 10 March 1900 Chelmsford, United Kingdom
- Died: 17 January 1987 (aged 86) Glenelg, South Australia
- Party: Labor
- Spouse: Lizzy Mills (m. 1924; d. 1987)
- Occupation: Wheatgrower

Ronald Redvers Loveday (10 March 1900 – 17 January 1987) was a Labor member of the South Australian House of Assembly for the seat of Whyalla from 1956 to 1970, who was Minister for Education in the Walsh government from 1965 to 1967 and Minister for Education and Minister for Aboriginal Affairs in the Dunstan government from 1967 to 1968. He oversaw wide-reaching reform of the South Australian education system.

== Early life and World War I service ==
Ronald Redvers Loveday was born on 10 March 1900 at Chelmsford in the county of Essex in the UK. His strict Congregationalist parents were a jeweller's manager, Frank Arthur Loveday, and his wife Alice Esther née Lake. Ron attended a local elementary school and then received a scholarship to attend King Edward VI Grammar School, Chelmsford. His mother took her own life in 1912, and from that point on Ron was a boarder at the school. While at the school he was a member of the school cadet corps. After a brief stint as a civil servant with the Inland Revenue and HM Customs and Excise, Loveday was recommended by his former headmaster and joined the Royal Naval Air Service (RNAS) on 17 March 1918 as a probationary flight officer.

The RNAS combined with the Royal Flying Corps on 1 April 1918 to form the Royal Air Force (RAF). Initially posted to the Royal Naval College at Greenwich, once he was a member of the RAF he was appointed as a probationary second lieutenant and posted to RAF Reading in Berkshire on 3 June and then No. 38 Training Squadron at Rendcomb in Gloucestershire on 29 June. Just prior to the Armistice of 11 November 1918, Loveday was posted to No. 45 Training Squadron at Lilbourne in Northamptonshire before attending a course of instruction at RAF Shoreham near Brighton in Sussex. He also served briefly with No. 33 (Australian) Training Squadron at Wendover and No. 44 Training Squadron at Lilbourne. He was demobilised in March 1919, with the rank of second lieutenant, and migrated to South Australia that October.

== Emigration to South Australia ==
On arrival in South Australia, Loveday worked on the pastoralist William George Mills' property, Millbrae, near Nairne in the Adelaide Hills. In 1922 Loveday obtained a 15 acres (6.1 ha) horticultural block at Renmark near the Murray River in the northeast of the state, and became engaged to Mills's youngest child, Liza "Lizzie" Hilliary. On 27 August 1924, Loveday married Lizzie at Chalmers Presbyterian Church in the state capital Adelaide. The farm turned out to be unworkable as an ongoing concern, and Loveday relocated, working as a haulage contractor mainly around Clare in the Mid North of the state. His service in World War I meant he was entitled to a soldier-settler block and took up land at Cungena inland from Streaky Bay on the Eyre Peninsula. The land Loveday took up was marginal, and he and his family lived in a basic iron and timber house while he cleared 1,400 acres (567 ha) of Mallee scrub on which to grow wheat. Drought and depressed grain prices made his situation difficult, and he became president of the local branch of the South Australian Wheat Growers’ Protection Association and secretary of its Eyre Peninsula section.

In February 1936 the Lovedays moved to Kernilla, Port Lincoln. His wife ran the farm while he began labouring jobs in the local area. He served as secretary (1940–56) of the local AEU and helped to form a branch of the Australian Labor Party at Whyalla. Active in local politics, he sat on several wartime committees and was a founding member (1945–65) of the Whyalla Town Commission. He was an ALP candidate for the Legislative Council Northern electorate in the 1947 and 1950 elections and in a 1949 by-election. When the electoral redistribution of 1955 gave Whyalla its own House of Assembly seat, he secured the Labor nomination and won it at the election next year.

== Political career ==
Once in the House, Loveday was always an advocate for the expansion of education services in Whyalla. He was also known for his wishes for the broadening of the horizon for children in rural areas. He was a founding member of the movement for BHP to establish a steelworks at Whyalla, which was opened in 1965.

When Labor won the 1965 election, Loveday was appointed and sworn as Minister for Education in the Walsh Government. He was the founding member of the bill introduced on 26 January 1966 that established the Flinders University of South Australia as a separate entity from the University of Adelaide. He overhauled the grading system for Intermediate and Leaving certificate examinations (1966) and for abolishing the externally examined Intermediate (1968). The divide between the single-sex technical schools and the more academic high schools, a problem which was slowly building and increasing class division under Loveday's predecessor, ended.

Loveday, as a staunch advocate of equality, started a staged process towards pay equity for women teachers, including 'accouchement leave' and other means of reducing discrimination were begun. Loveday approved a pioneering experiment in which Pitjantjatjara children received their first formal schooling in their own language. However, his inept handling in 1966-67 of the (John) Murrie case—involving a Darwin primary-school headmaster who publicly complained about the lack of experienced teachers at his school—angered many in the teaching profession.

After Walsh retired and Don Dunstan took office in June 1967, Loveday was also sworn in as Minister for Aboriginal Affairs. He was to the left of many in the Labor party and many men of his age on emerging social issues. In 1968 he supported the case for abortion law reform. Loveday retired from parliament at the 1970 election, in which the Playmander was taken apart and the Labor government again gained office after Dunstan.

== Death and legacy ==
Loveday and his family had moved to Glenelg in 1965. When he died in January 1987, Dunstan described him as a man of admirable 'intellect, integrity and forthrightness'.

== Footnotes ==
Political offices
Preceded by Baden Pattinson	Minister for Education; 1965–1968	Succeeded by Joyce Steele
Preceded by Don Dunstan	Minister for Aboriginal Affairs; 1967–1968	Succeeded by Robin Millhouse
Parliament of South Australia
New seat	Member for Whyalla; 1956–1970	Succeeded by Max Brown
