= Electoral district of Whyalla =

Former South Australian state electoral district

Whyalla South Australia—House of Assembly
- State: South Australia
- Dates current: 1956–1993
- Namesake: Whyalla, South Australia
- Demographic: Rural
- Coordinates: 32°02′S 137°34′E

Whyalla was an electoral district of the House of Assembly in the Australian state of South Australia from 1956 to 1993. The district was based on the town of Whyalla. It was held by the Labor Party for its entire existence, and was one of the few areas outside Adelaide where Labor consistently did well. Indeed, for most of its existence, it was one of Labor's safest non-metropolitan seats, giving Labor candidates margins rivaling those in Adelaide-area seats.

The district was abolished at the 1993 state election and replaced by Giles.

== Members for Whyalla ==
Member	Party	Term
Ron Loveday	Labor	1956–1970
Max Brown	Labor	1970–1985
Frank Blevins	Labor	1985–1993
