= Electoral district of Frome =

Former South Australian state electoral district

Frome South Australia—House of Assembly
- Interactive map of electoral district boundaries from the 2022 state election
- State: South Australia
- Created: 1884, 1938, 1993
- Abolished: 1902, 1977, 2026
- Namesake: Edward Charles Frome
- Electors: 23,319 (2018)
- Area: 12,921.4 km^{2} (4,989.0 sq mi)
- Demographic: Rural
- Coordinates: 33°50′0″S 138°36′0″E

Footnotes
- Electoral District map

Frome was a single-member electoral district for the South Australian House of Assembly across three incarnations from 1884 to 2026. It was named after Edward Charles Frome, the third surveyor-general of South Australia. The electorate stretched north-eastwards from the Gawler River and Gulf St Vincent in the south, and included many of the agricultural areas of the Clare and Gilbert Valleys. It covered a total of 12,921 km^{2} (4,989 sq mi) and included the towns of Auburn, Clare, Mintaro, Port Broughton, Saddleworth, Snowtown and Riverton.

== History ==
Frome existed in three incarnations throughout the history of the House of Assembly: as a two-seat multi-member marginal electorate from 1884 to 1902, as a single-member electorate from 1938 to 1977, and as a marginal to moderately safe single-member electorate for the Liberal Party from 1993 to 2026.

The electoral districts of Pirie and Port Pirie have also historically existed.

The first incarnation of Frome was, like the rest of the state, independent-held until the development of the party system in the 1890s. The two seats were split evenly with a conservative and a liberal member from 1890 until the seat's abolition in 1902.

The second incarnation began in 1938 after the introduction of the Playmander. It was based on the area north of Port Pirie, and was originally a Labor stronghold. The seat was won by Mick O'Halloran, who held it until his death in 1960, serving as Opposition Leader from 1949 to 1960. After the Playmander was significantly diluted by the 1970 electoral reforms, Frome was moved into more conservative-leaning rural areas around Port Pirie, turning it into a notional Liberal and Country League (LCL) seat. O'Halloran's successor, Tom Casey, believed this made Frome impossible to hold and successfully transferred to the Legislative Council. The LCL, which later became the South Australia division of the Liberal Party, won the seat at the 1970 election, and went on to hold Frome until the abolition of the seat in 1977.

The third and final incarnation was created at the 1991 redistribution as a marginal Liberal seat based on Port Pirie. The seat was first contested at the 1993 election. Despite the presence of Port Pirie, a Labor stronghold for more than a century, Labor never won this incarnation due to the heavy Liberal tilt of the surrounding rural area. Rob Kerin became the elected member in the Liberal landslide of 1993. He went on to become Premier of South Australia in 2001, and Leader of the Opposition from 2002 to 2005 after the Liberals narrowly lost the 2002 state election. Kerin chose to retire in November 2008, which triggered the January 2009 by-election. The by-election was won by independent Geoff Brock, the popular mayor of the Port Pirie Regional Council, after a very close contest with the Labor candidate for second place behind the Liberal candidate. Brock received sufficient preferences from the eliminated Labor candidate to prevail over the Liberal candidate by over 600 votes, receiving 51.7 percent of the two-candidate vote. He increased his primary and two-candidate vote significantly at the 2010 election; Labor won 50.1 percent of the "traditional" Labor/Liberal two-party preferred vote at this election.

With the 2012 redistribution, the Labor/Liberal two-party-preferred margin in Frome went from 0.1 percent Labor to 1.7 percent Liberal. Brock retained the electorate at the 2014 election with a slight increase to his margin, while the Liberals won 60.8 percent of the "traditional" two-party preferred vote. His decision to back the Labor minority government allowed Labor to win a record fourth consecutive four-year term in government.

Brock retained the electorate at the 2018 election. A redistribution in 2020 transferred the regional city of Port Pirie, where Brock was based in, from Frome to the electorate of Stuart. Brock transferred to Stuart at the 2022 state election and Frome was regained for the Liberal Party in the election by Penny Pratt.

== Abolition ==
During the redistribution process after the 2022 election, Reggie Martin MLC made a submission concerning the name of Frome. Martin expressed concerns over the use of Frome's name due to his involvement in retributive actions against Aboriginal people in the Coorong area following the Maria massacre. The Commission sought further information from Dr Skye Krichauff, a historian specialising in South Australian colonial history and the relations between Aboriginal people and colonists, and Professor Irene Watson. The Commission determined that the district should be renamed, and received various submissions from Aboriginal organisations who have a connection to the area encompassed by the district of Frome. The sitting member Penny Pratt had advocated for the district to be renamed in honour of former Liberal premier Steele Hall and member for Gouger and Goyder, who died earlier that year age 95.

The Electoral Commission of South Australia made the ultimate decision to abolish the seat the Frome and create the seat of Ngadjuri. The name "Ngadjuri", meaning "we people", was chosen over the name "Cowie", meaning "water". This came into effect at the 2026 election.

== Members for Frome ==
First incarnation of Frome (1884–1902, two members)
Member 1	Party	Term	Member 2	Party	Term
Ebenezer Ward		1884–1890	William Copley		1884–1887
Laurence O'Loughlin		1890–1891	Clement Giles		1887–1891
Laurence O'Loughlin	Defence League	1891–1896	Clement Giles	Defence League	1891–1896
Laurence O'Loughlin		1896–1902	Clement Giles	National League	1896–1902

Second incarnation of Frome (1938–1977)
Member	Party	Term
Mick O'Halloran	Labor	1938–1960
Tom Casey	Labor	1960–1970
Ernest Allen	Liberal and Country	1970–1974
Ernest Allen	Liberal	1974–1977

Third incarnation of Frome (1993–2026)
Member	Party	Term
Rob Kerin	Liberal	1993–2008
Geoff Brock	Independent	2009–2022
Penny Pratt	Liberal	2022–2026

== Election results ==
2022 South Australian state election: Frome
Party	Candidate	Votes	%	±%
Liberal	Penny Pratt	10,573	45.0	−10.1
Labor	Ashton Charvetto	6,002	25.6	+5.5
Independent	Cate Hunter	3,908	16.6	+16.6
One Nation	Caterina Johnston	2,588	11.0	+11.0
National	Loma Silsbury	410	1.7	+1.7
Total formal votes		23,481	96.3	
Informal votes		900	3.7	
Turnout		24,381	90.6	
Two-party-preferred result
Liberal	Penny Pratt	13,645	58.1	−10.0
Labor	Ashton Charvetto	9,836	41.9	+10.0
Liberal notional hold		Swing	−10.0	

Distribution of preferences: Frome
Party	Candidate	Votes	Round 1		Round 2		Round 3	
Party	Candidate	Votes	Dist.	Total	Dist.	Total	Dist.	Total
Quota (50% + 1)		11,741						
Liberal	Penny Pratt	10,573	+135	10,708	+485	11,193	+2,451	13,644
Labor	Ashton Charvetto	6,002	+45	6,047	+532	6,579	+3,258	9,837
Independent	Cate Hunter	3,908	+130	4,038	+1,671	5,709	Excluded	
One Nation	Caterina Johnston	2,588	+100	2,688	Excluded			
National	Loma Silsbury	410	Excluded					
