= John Coumbe =

Australian politician

The Honourable John Coumbe AM

Deputy Leader of the South Australian Liberal Party (Note: Known as the Liberal and Country League until 22 July 1974)
- In office 19 March 1973 – 24 July 1975
- Leader: Bruce Eastick
- Preceded by: Robin Millhouse
- Succeeded by: Roger Goldsworthy

Minister of Education
- In office 2 March 1970 – 2 June 1970
- Premier: Steele Hall
- Preceded by: Joyce Steele
- Succeeded by: Hugh Hudson

Minister for Works
- In office 17 April 1968 – 2 March 1970
- Premier: Steele Hall
- Preceded by: Cyril Hutchens
- Succeeded by: Allan Rodda

Member for Torrens
- In office 3 March 1956 – 17 September 1977
- Preceded by: Leo Travers
- Succeeded by: Michael Wilson

Personal details
- Born: John Coumbe; 28 September 1916 Croydon, South Australia
- Died: 9 February 1983 (aged 66)
- Party: Liberal & Country

John William Hurtle Coumbe AM (28 September 1916 – 9 February 1983) was an Australian politician who represented the South Australian House of Assembly seat of Torrens from 1956 to 1977 for the Liberal and Country League and Liberal Party. On 26 September 1969, Coumbe laid the millionth brick of the Strathmont Centre in what is now Oakden.

Political offices
Preceded by Cyril Hutchens	Minister for Works; 1968 – 1970	Succeeded by Allan Rodda
