= Cyril Hutchens =

Australian politician

The Honourable Cyril Hutchens

Deputy Leader of the South Australian Labor Party
- In office 5 October 1960 – 1 June 1967
- Preceded by: Frank Walsh
- Succeeded by: Des Corcoran

Member for Hindmarsh
- In office 4 March 1950 – 1 May 1970
- Preceded by: John McInnes
- Succeeded by: seat abolished

Personal details
- Born: Cyril Douglas Hutchens; 19 February 1904 Woodside, South Australia
- Died: 27 March 1982 (aged 78)
- Party: South Australian Labor Party

Cyril Douglas Hutchens CBE (19 February 1904 – 27 March 1982) was an Australian politician who represented the South Australian House of Assembly seat of Hindmarsh from 1950 to 1970 for the Labor Party.

He was Commissioner of Public Works in South Australia from 1965 to 1968.

In 1970 Hutchens retired from politics when his Hindmarsh seat was abolished, much of it moving into the new electoral area of Spence, for which Ernie Crimes was selected as the Labor candidate.

Political offices
Preceded by Glen Pearson	Minister for Works; 1965 – 1968	Succeeded by John Coumbe
