= Tom Casey (Australian politician) =

Australian politician

Thomas Mannix Casey (12 March 1921 – 25 September 2003) was a politician in the State of South Australia.

== History ==
He was born in Quorn, South Australia, where his father James Casey may have been proprietor of the Hotel Austral, then farmed at "Amelia Park", Peterborough. He was educated at Unley High School.

He was chosen the Labor candidate for the seat of Frome in the House of Assembly in November 1960 following the unexpected death of sitting member Mick O'Halloran. Tom was not even a member of the Labor Party, but as a respected local identity was considered to have a better chance of following the idiosyncratic O'Halloran than an outsider from the Union movement. After a redistribution erased his majority and made Frome a notional LCL seat, Casey resigned in May 1970 to contest a Central No. 1 district seat in the Legislative Council. He held the seat until September 1979, when he resigned, having successfully made the transition to the single-electorate Council in 1975. He served for a month in 1968 as Minister of Agriculture and Forests, then again from 1970 to 1975; then from 1975 to 1979 as Minister of Tourism, Recreation and Sport, Minister of Lands and Minister of Repatriation.

== Family ==
He married Margaret Mary Crick of Thorpdale, Victoria in February 1946, and settled on the family farm "Amelia Park", near Peterborough.

Parliament of South Australia
Preceded by Mick O'Halloran	Member for Frome; 1960–1970	Succeeded by Ernest Allen
