= Joyce Steele =

Australian politician

Joyce Steele OBE

Minister for Aboriginal Affairs and Housing
- In office 2 March 1970 – 2 June 1970
- Premier: Steele Hall
- Preceded by: Robin Millhouse
- Succeeded by: Don Dunstan

Minister of Education
- In office 17 April 1968 – 2 March 1970
- Premier: Steele Hall
- Preceded by: Ronald Loveday
- Succeeded by: John Coumbe

Member for Davenport Burnside (1959—1970)
- In office 7 March 1959 – 9 March 1973
- Preceded by: Geoffrey Clarke
- Succeeded by: Dean Brown

Personal details
- Born: Joyce Wishart; 29 May 1909
- Died: 24 September 1991 (aged 82) Adelaide
- Party: Liberal
- Spouse: Wilfred Steele (m. 1936)
- Children: three
- Occupation: Homemaker, disability advocate, politician

Joyce Steele (29 May 1909 – 24 September 1991) was an Australian politician and one of the first two women elected to the Parliament of South Australia, the other being Jessie Cooper. Steele was elected to the House of Assembly and Cooper was elected to the Legislative Council at the 1959 election. Ironically, while the 1896 election in South Australia made it the first state to give women the right to vote and stand for election, it was the last state to elect a female representative.

Prior to her election, Joyce Steele was a homemaker, an ABC broadcaster and active in community organisations, including the Queen Adelaide Club (the women's equivalent of the exclusive Adelaide Club). She was pre-selected for the Liberal and Country League's (LCL) safest metropolitan seat, Burnside, in 1959 and was comfortably elected. She was not a feminist, and was affiliated with the conservative wing of the LCL.

Molly Byrne was Labor's first female elected to the Parliament of South Australia at the 1965 election.

Steele was also the first South Australian woman to achieve Cabinet rank in the South Australian Parliament as Minister of Education in the Hall Government from 1968 to 1969. As South Australian schools were increasingly overcrowded due to the children of the baby boomers passing through, it was a tough portfolio, although moderate increases in education spending were allocated. She took the Social Welfare ministry for the remainder of the Hall government's term.

After the government passed electoral reform legislation in 1968, Burnside was mostly replaced by the equally safe seat of Bragg. However, Steele did not contest this seat, instead transferring to the LCL's safest new seat, Davenport, which covered the south-east of the City of Burnside. She received 68% of the primary vote in the 1970 election. On 9 June 1973, Young Liberals State President and Liberal Movement member Dean Brown announced his intention to stand for Davenport pre-selection. Steele, in response, announced her retirement, but not without declaring that "[Dean] certainly will not have my support. I think my attitude to the Liberal Movement is well known".

In the 1981 New Years Honours Steele was made an Officer of the Order of the British Empire (OBE).

== See also ==
- Women and government in Australia
- Women in the South Australian House of Assembly
