= David Brookman (Australian politician) =

Australian politician

David Norman Brookman (24 March 1917 – 22 May 2000) was a politician in the state of South Australia.

== History ==
David Brookman was born in Melbourne the son of Norman Brookman (1884–1949), and his wife Ada Mary Dorothy "Nan" Brookman, née Burden, (1889–). His father Norman, who died in a car crash, was a son of Sir George Brookman (1840–1927).

David was educated at St Peter's College and Roseworthy College where he gained his Diploma of Agriculture in 1938, and took over his father's farm at Meadows.

He served in World War II as an artillery officer in the Middle East and Borneo with the 2nd AIF 2/7 Australian Field Regiment 9th Div.

He was elected to the seat of Electoral district of Alexandra in the House of Assembly for the Liberal and Country League in 1948, filling the seat made vacant by the death of Sir Herbert Hudd, and held that seat until 1973. He served as Minister for Agriculture 1958–1965, and Minister for Lands 1968–1970.

== Other interests ==
He was a member of the Adelaide Club and the Royal Adelaide Golf Club.

== Family ==
He married Alison Harvey on 1 October 1946 and lived at Meadows, later Dutton Terrace, Medindie. They had two children:

- Henry (26 November 1948 – )
- Katherine (22 March 1953 – )
