= South Australian House of Assembly =

Lower house of the state's Parliament

Coordinates: 34°55′16″S 138°35′55″E

House of Assembly
- 56th Parliament

Type
- Type: Lower house of the Parliament of South Australia

History
- Founded: 22 April 1857; 169 years ago

Leadership
- Speaker: Nat Cook, Independent since 5 May 2026
- Leader of Government Business: Tom Koutsantonis, Labor since 24 March 2022

Structure
- Seats: 47
- Political groups: Government (33): Labor (33); Opposition (5): Liberal (5); Crossbench (9): One Nation (4); Independent (4); Speaker (1) (Note: Under the provisions of the Constitution (Independent Speaker) Amendment Act 2021 (SA), the Speaker is constitutionally banned from being a member of a registered political party outside of a "relevant election period". The current speaker, Nat Cook, was elected as a Labor Party candidate.)
- Length of term: 4 years

Elections
- Voting system: Full preferential voting
- First election: 9 March 1857
- Last election: 21 March 2026
- Next election: March 2030
- Redistricting: Redistributions are carried out after each election by the South Australian Electoral Districts Boundaries Commission.

Meeting place
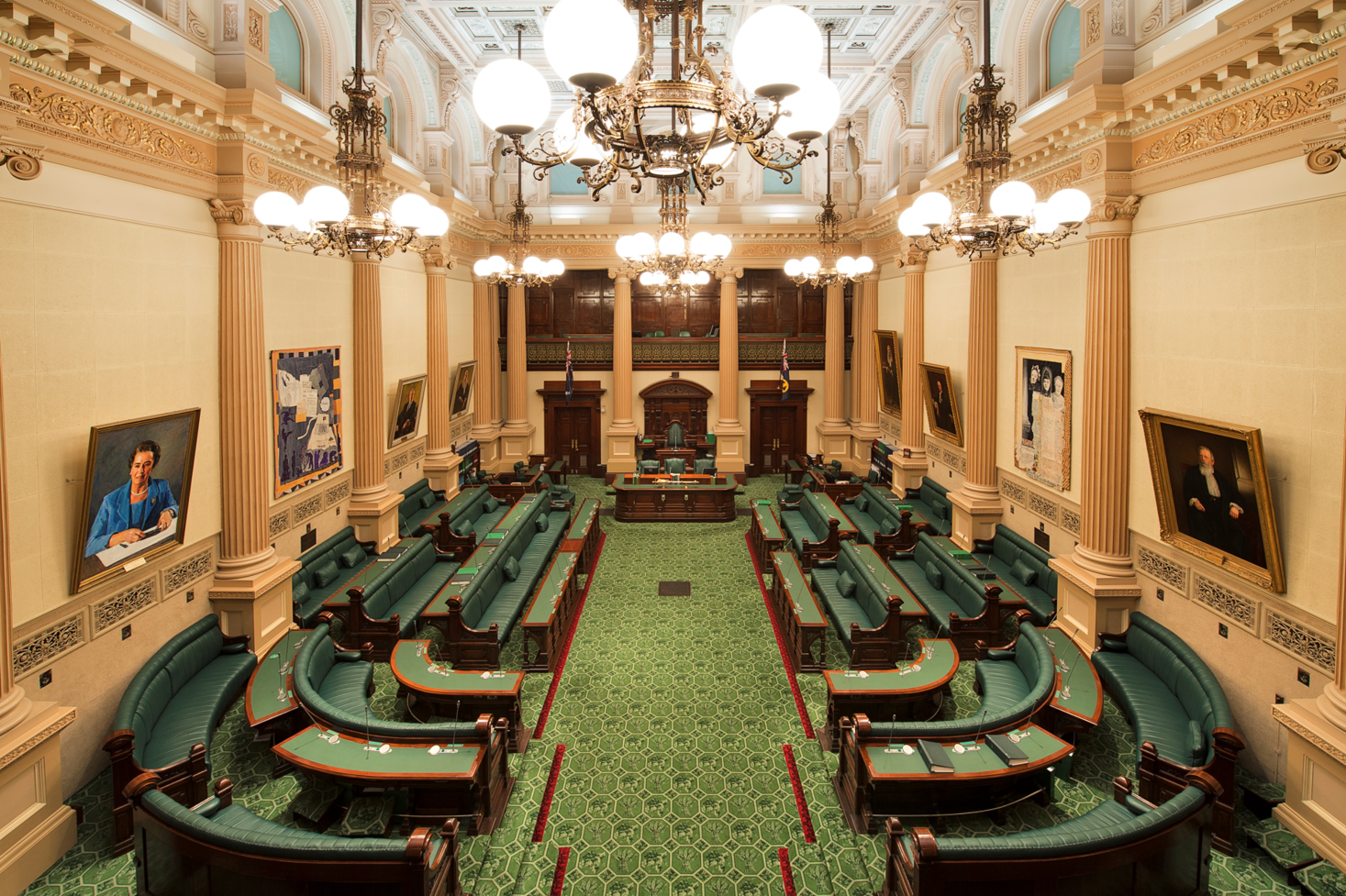
- House of Assembly Chamber, Parliament House, Adelaide, South Australia, Australia

Website
- SA House of Assembly

The House of Assembly is the lower house of the bicameral Parliament of South Australia, the upper house being the Legislative Council.

== Overview ==
The House of Assembly was created in 1857, when South Australia attained self-government. The development of an elected legislature — although only men could vote — marked a significant change from the prior system, where legislative power was in the hands of the Governor and the Legislative Council, which was appointed by the Governor.

In 1895, the House of Assembly granted women the right to vote and stand for election to the legislature. South Australia was the second place in the world to do so after New Zealand in 1893, and the first to allow women to stand for election. (The first woman candidates for the South Australia Assembly ran in 1918 general election, in Adelaide and Sturt.)

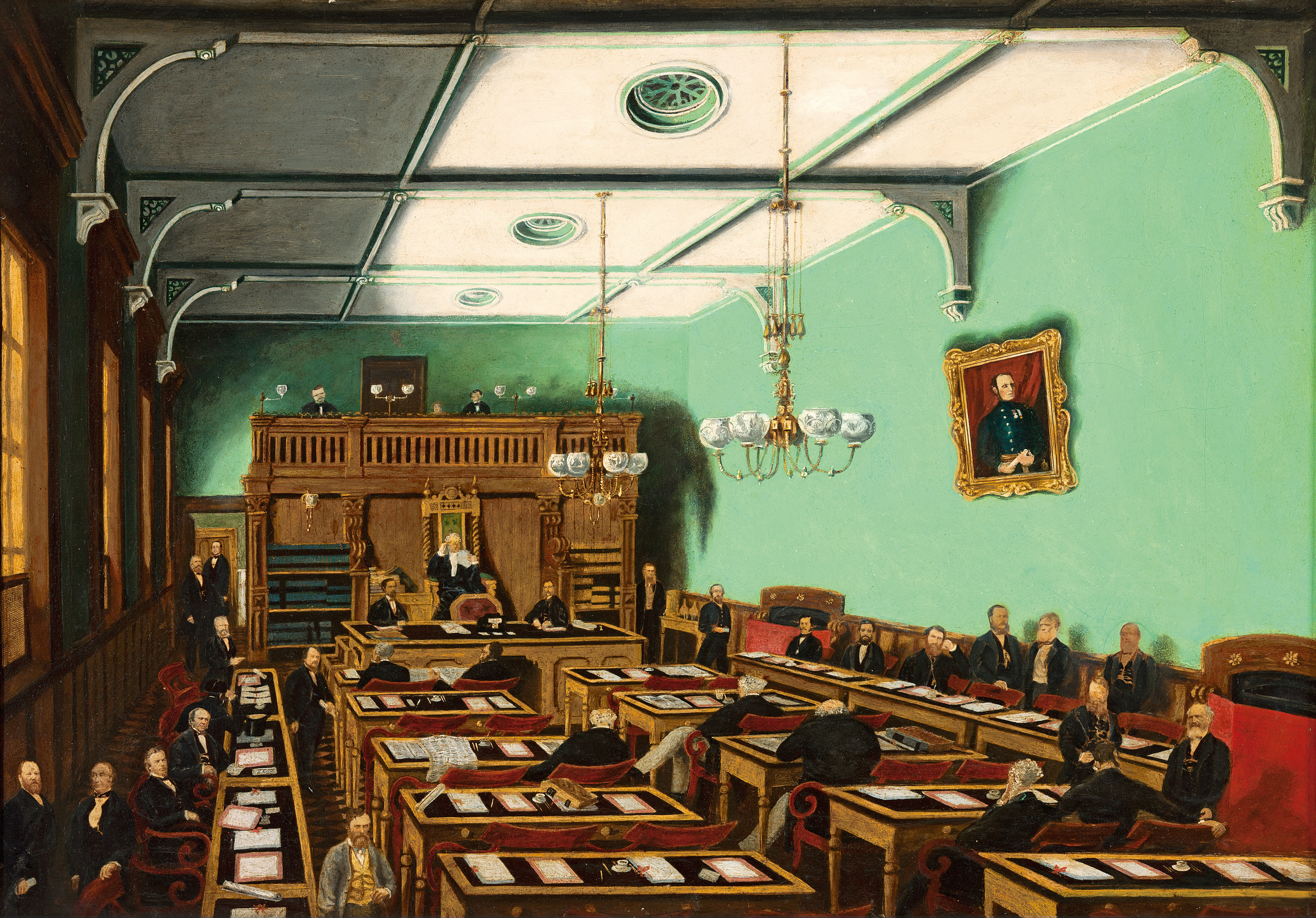
A painting of the House of Assembly meeting in Old Parliament House in 1867

From 1857 to 1933, the House of Assembly was elected from multi-member districts, commonly known as "seats", with each district returning between one and six members. The size of the Assembly varied during this time—36 members from 1857 to 1875, 46 members from 1875 to 1884, 52 members from 1884 to 1890, 54 members from 1890 to 1902, 42 members from 1902 to 1912, 40 members from 1912 to 1915 after the Northern Territory was ceded to federal administration, and 46 members from 1915 to 1938. In 1938, the Assembly was reduced to 39 members, elected from single-member districts.

The House of Assembly has had 47 members since the 1970 election, elected from single-member districts: currently 34 in the Adelaide metropolitan area and 13 in rural areas. These seats are intended to represent approximately the same population in each electorate. Voting is by Instant-runoff voting and preferential voting with complete preference allocation, as with the equivalent federal chamber, the Australian House of Representatives. All members face re-election approximately every four years. The most recent election was held on 19 March 2022.

The House is presided over by a Speaker, who, as of the passage of the Constitution (Independent Speaker) Amendment Act 2021, is constitutionally banned from being a member of a registered political party outside of a "relevant election period".

A map of South Australian electorates 1955-69, during the height of the Playmander

Another distinctive aspect of the history of the South Australian Parliament was the "Playmander", a gerrymandering system that instituted a pro-rural electoral malapportionment introduced by the incumbent Liberal and Country League (LCL) government, and in place for 32 years from 1936 to 1968. The already entrenched rural overweighting was increased to a 2:1 ratio, the number of MPs was reduced to 39 and the multi-member seats were abandoned for single-member seats. The House of Assembly now consisted of 26 low-population rural seats, which due to population shifts, were holding up to a 10-to-1 advantage over the 13 high-population metropolitan seats, even though rural seats contained only a third of South Australia's population. At the peak of the malapportionment in 1968, the rural seat of Frome had 4,500 formal votes, while the metropolitan seat of Enfield had 42,000 formal votes.

Labor won enough parliamentary seats to form government just once during the Playmander against the odds − in 1965. Labor won comprehensive majorities of the statewide two-party-preferred (2PP) vote while failing to form government in 1944, 1953, 1962 and 1968.

More equitable boundaries were subsequently put in place following the 1968, 1975, and 1989 elections.

Most legislation is initiated in the House of Assembly. The party or coalition with a majority of seats in the lower house is invited by the Governor to form government. The leader of that party becomes Premier of South Australia, and their senior colleagues become ministers responsible for various portfolios. As Australian MPs almost always vote along party lines, almost all legislation introduced by the governing party will pass through the House of Assembly.

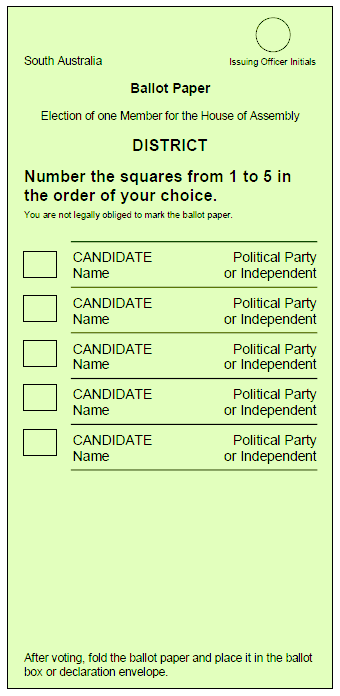
South Australian House of Assembly ballot paper

As with the federal parliament and Australian other states and territories, voting in the Assembly is compulsory for all those over the age of 18. Voting in the House of Assembly had originally been voluntary, but this was changed in 1942.

While South Australia's total population is 1.7 million, 1.3 million of them live in Adelaide. Over 75% of the state's population resides in the metropolitan area. As a result, Adelaide accounts for 72% (34 of 47) of the seats in the chamber. The dominance of Adelaide, combined with a lack of comparatively-sized rural population centres, results in the metropolitan area frequently deciding election outcomes. At the 2014 election for example, although the state-wide 2PP vote was 47.0% Labor v 53.0% Liberal, the metropolitan area recorded a 2PP of 51.5% Labor v 48.5% Liberal.

== Membership ==
Year	1856	1861	1872	1882	1888	1901	1910	1913	1936	1969
Districts	17	18	22	26	27	13	12	19	39	47
Members	36		46	52	54	42	40	46	39	47

== Election result summaries ==
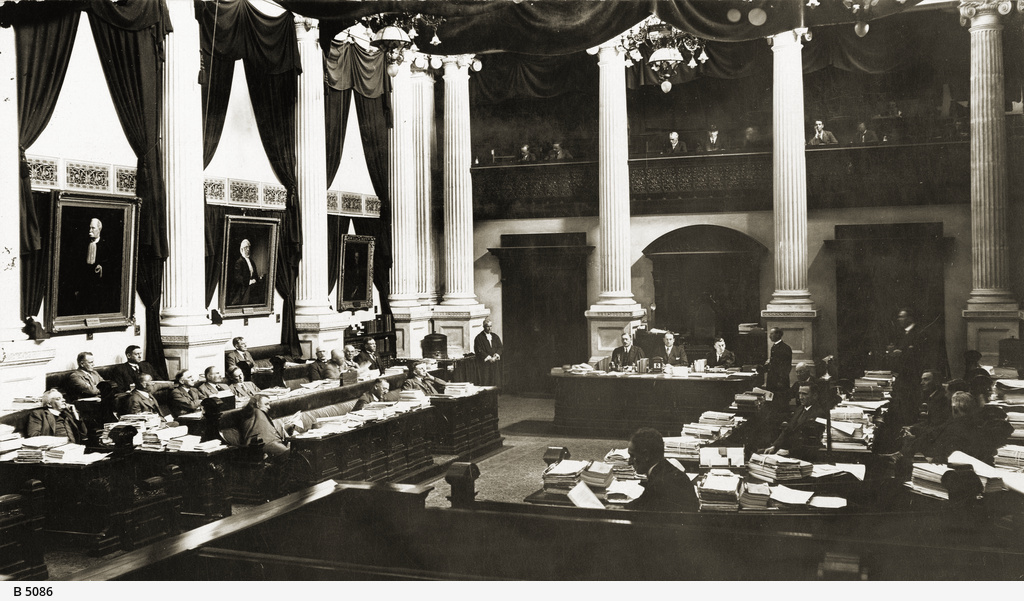
House of Assembly chamber circa 1928.

== Father of the House of Assembly ==
From	To	Member	Term Started	Status
1 January 1964	2 March 1968	Thomas Playford IV; Tom Stott	1933	Joint Fathers
2 March 1968	30 May 1970	Tom Stott	1933	Father
30 May 1970	10 March 1973	David Brookman	Appointed in 1948 due to death of Sir Hubert Hudd	Father
10 March 1973	15 September 1979	Don Dunstan; Jack Jennings	1953	Joint Fathers
17 September 1977	15 September 1979	Don Dunstan	1953	Father
15 September 1979	9 November 1982	Des Corcoran	1962	Father
9 November 1982	6 December 1985	Allan Rodda	1965	Father
6 December 1985	11 December 1993	Stan Evans	1968	Father
11 December 1993	11 October 1997	Heini Becker; Graham Gunn	1970	Joint Fathers
11 October 1997	20 March 2010	Graham Gunn	1970	Father
20 March 2010	11 October 2014	Bob Such; Michael Atkinson	1989	Joint Fathers
11 October 2014	17 March 2018	Michael Atkinson	1989	Father
17 March 2018	19 March 2022	Frances Bedford; Tom Koutsantonis	1997	Joint Father/Mother
19 March 2022	Present	Tom Koutsantonis	1997	Father

== Historical composition ==
1893	54	26 / 18 / 10	Hung parliament
1896	54	24 / 18 / 12	Hung parliament
1899	54	29 / 14 / 11	Hung parliament
1902	52	20 / 17 / 5	Hung parliament
1905	52	15 / 11 / 9 / 7	ALP minority
1906	52	17 / 9 / 8 / 5 / 3	ALP minority
1910	42	22 / 20	ALP majority
1912	42	24 / 16	LU majority
1915	46	26 / 20	ALP majority
1918	46	22 / 17 / 6 / 1	LU minority
1921	46	25 / 16 / 4 / 1	LU majority
1924	46	27 / 17 / 2	ALP majority
1927	46	23 / 16 / 5 / 2	LIB minority
1930	46	30 / 13 / 2 / 1	ALP majority
1933	46	29 / 6 / 4 / 3 / 3 / 1	LCL majority
1938	39	15 / 14 / 9 / 1	LCL minority
1941	39	20 / 11 / 8	LCL majority
1944	39	20 / 16 / 3	LCL majority
1947	39	23 / 13 / 3	LCL majority
1950	39	23 / 12 / 4	LCL majority
1953	39	20 / 15 / 4	LCL majority
1956	39	21 / 15 / 3	LCL majority
1959	39	20 / 17 / 2	LCL majority
1962	39	19 / 18 / 2	LCL minority
1965	39	21 / 17 / 1	ALP majority
1968	39	19 / 19 / 1	LCL minority
1970	47	27 / 20	ALP majority
1973	47	26 / 20 / 1	ALP majority
1975	47	23 / 20 / 2 / 1 / 1	ALP minority
1977	47	27 / 17 / 1 / 1 / 1	ALP majority
1979	47	25 / 19 / 1 / 1 / 1	LIB majority
1982	47	24 / 21 / 1 / 1	ALP majority
1985	47	27 / 16 / 3 / 1	ALP majority
1989	47	22 / 22 / 2 / 1	ALP minority
1993	47	37 / 10	LIB majority
1997	47	23 / 21 / 1 / 1	LIB minority
2002	47	23 / 20 / 3 / 1	ALP minority
2006	47	28 / 15 / 3 / 1	ALP majority
2010	47	26 / 18 / 3	ALP majority
2014	47	23 / 22 / 2	ALP minority
2018	47	25 / 19 / 3	LIB majority
2022	47	27 / 16 / 4	ALP majority
2026	47	34 / 5 / 4 / 4	ALP majority

== See also ==
- List of elections in South Australia
- List of South Australian state by-elections
- Members of the South Australian House of Assembly
- Parliaments of the Australian states and territories
