= Results of the 1944 South Australian state election (House of Assembly) =

Songwriter

South Australian state election, 29 April 1944 House of Assembly << 1941–1947 >>
Enrolled voters	289,032				
Votes cast	255,883		Turnout	88.53%	+37.84%
Informal votes	8,229		Informal	3.22%	+1.26%
Summary of votes by party
Party	Primary votes	%	Swing	Seats	Change
Liberal and Country	113,536	45.84%	+8.29%	20	± 0
Labor	105,298	42.52%	+9.27%	16	+ 5
Communist	5,136	2.07%	*	0	± 0
Independent	16,439	6.64%	–17.97%	3	– 2
Independent Labor	5,587	2.26%	–0.76%	0	– 2
Independent Liberal	1,658	0.67%	–0.91%	0	– 1
Total	247,654			39	
Two-party-preferred
Liberal and Country		46.70%	*		
Labor		53.30%	*		

This is a list of House of Assembly results for the 1944 South Australian state election.

== Results by electoral district ==
=== Adelaide ===
1944 South Australian state election: Adelaide
Party	Candidate	Votes	%	±%
Independent	Doug Bardolph	5,587	43.5	−13.7
Labor	Bob Dale	4,775	37.2	+4.8
Communist	Alfred Watt	2,492	19.4	+19.4
Total formal votes		12,854	93.1	−2.8
Informal votes		947	6.9	+2.8
Turnout		13,801	83.0	+46.0
Two-party-preferred result
Labor	Bob Dale	6,734	52.4	
Independent	Doug Bardolph	6,120	47.6	
Labor gain from Independent		Swing	N/A	

=== Albert ===
1944 South Australian state election: Albert
Party	Candidate	Votes	%	±%
Liberal and Country	Malcolm McIntosh	3,078	66.4	+4.2
Independent	J P Ryan	1,025	22.1	+22.1
Labor	John Cronin	531	11.5	+11.5
Total formal votes		4,634	97.8	−0.6
Informal votes		102	2.2	+0.6
Turnout		4,736	88.3	+27.8
Liberal and Country hold		Swing	N/A	

- Preferences were not distributed.

=== Alexandra ===
1944 South Australian state election: Alexandra
Party	Candidate	Votes	%	±%
Liberal and Country	Herbert Hudd	unopposed		
Liberal and Country hold		Swing		

=== Angas ===
1944 South Australian state election: Angas (supplementary)
Party	Candidate	Votes	%	±%
Liberal and Country	Berthold Teusner	2,767	52.6	+2.4
Labor	William Robinson	2,099	39.9	−20.2
Independent	William Haese	397	7.5	−22.6
Total formal votes		5,263	98.8	+0.5
Informal votes		64	1.2	−0.5
Turnout		5,327	90.2	+26.2
Liberal and Country hold		Swing	N/A	

- Preferences were not distributed.

=== Burnside ===
1944 South Australian state election: Burnside
Party	Candidate	Votes	%	±%
Liberal and Country	Charles Abbott	9,960	64.1	−9.6
Labor	Frank White	5,568	35.9	+17.8
Total formal votes		15,528	96.4	−1.7
Informal votes		577	3.6	+1.7
Turnout		16,105	88.2	+41.4
Liberal and Country hold		Swing	N/A	

=== Burra ===
1944 South Australian state election: Burra
Party	Candidate	Votes	%	±%
Liberal and Country	Archibald McDonald	2,265	55.7	−2.4
Labor	Ellis Bristow	1,803	44.3	+2.4
Total formal votes		4,068	97.6	−0.7
Informal votes		99	2.4	+0.7
Turnout		4,167	90.0	+28.5
Liberal and Country hold		Swing	−2.4	

=== Chaffey ===
1944 South Australian state election: Chaffey
Party	Candidate	Votes	%	±%
Independent	William MacGillivray	3,239	61.9	−1.7
Labor	Robert Curren	1,997	38.1	+1.7
Total formal votes		5,236	96.6	−0.9
Informal votes		186	3.4	+0.9
Turnout		5,422	87.2	+41.0
Independent hold		Swing	−1.7	

=== Eyre ===
1944 South Australian state election: Eyre
Party	Candidate	Votes	%	±%
Liberal and Country	Arthur Christian	2,618	59.9	−6.1
Labor	William Gosling	1,193	27.3	+27.3
Independent	Oliver Eatts	560	12.8	+12.8
Total formal votes		4,371	96.5	−1.4
Informal votes		157	3.5	+1.4
Turnout		4,528	88.0	+39.2
Liberal and Country hold		Swing	N/A	

=== Flinders ===
1944 South Australian state election: Flinders
Party	Candidate	Votes	%	±%
Liberal and Country	Rex Pearson	2,185	42.1	+8.0
Labor	John O'Leary	1,383	26.7	−1.3
Single Tax League	Edward Craigie	1,208	23.3	−14.7
Unendorsed Liberal	Janette Octoman	410	7.9	+7.9
Total formal votes		5,186	97.5	−1.6
Informal votes		132	2.5	+1.6
Turnout		5,318	89.0	+33.8
Two-party-preferred result
Liberal and Country	Rex Pearson	3,059	59.0	+5.6
Labor	John O'Leary	2,127	41.0	+41.0
Liberal and Country hold		Swing	N/A	

=== Frome ===
1944 South Australian state election: Frome
Party	Candidate	Votes	%	±%
Labor	Mick O'Halloran	unopposed		
Labor hold		Swing		

=== Gawler ===
1944 South Australian state election: Gawler
Party	Candidate	Votes	%	±%
Labor	Leslie Duncan	2,985	56.7	+24.5
Liberal and Country	Elliott Day	2,280	43.3	+3.6
Total formal votes		5,265	97.7	−1.3
Informal votes		126	2.3	+1.3
Turnout		5,391	90.8	+21.9
Labor hold		Swing	+3.7	

=== Glenelg ===
1944 South Australian state election: Glenelg
Party	Candidate	Votes	%	±%
Liberal and Country	Frank Smith	9,710	57.0	−7.8
Labor	John Fitzgerald	7,327	43.0	+7.8
Total formal votes		17,037	96.4	−0.5
Informal votes		637	3.6	+0.5
Turnout		17,674	89.8	+42.2
Liberal and Country hold		Swing	−7.8	

=== Goodwood ===
1944 South Australian state election: Goodwood
Party	Candidate	Votes	%	±%
Labor	Frank Walsh	8,883	59.5	+14.7
Liberal and Country	Archibald MacMillan	6,051	40.5	+10.3
Total formal votes		14,934	96.5	−1.9
Informal votes		543	3.5	+1.9
Turnout		15,477	87.6	+43.2
Labor hold		Swing	+8.8	

=== Gouger ===
1944 South Australian state election: Gouger
Party	Candidate	Votes	%	±%
Liberal and Country	Rufus Goldney	2,700	51.0	+3.0
Labor	Horace Bowden	2,595	49.0	+49.0
Total formal votes		5,295	97.9	−0.5
Informal votes		113	2.1	+0.5
Turnout		5,408	90.2	+25.4
Liberal and Country gain from Independent		Swing	N/A	

=== Gumeracha ===
1944 South Australian state election: Gumeracha
Party	Candidate	Votes	%	±%
Liberal and Country	Thomas Playford	3,752	72.1	−27.9
Labor	Wilfred Holmes	1,451	27.9	+27.9
Total formal votes		5,203	98.2	
Informal votes		95	1.8	
Turnout		5,298	89.5	
Liberal and Country hold		Swing	N/A	

=== Hindmarsh ===
1944 South Australian state election: Hindmarsh
Party	Candidate	Votes	%	±%
Labor	John McInnes	unopposed		
Labor hold		Swing		

=== Light ===
1944 South Australian state election: Light
Party	Candidate	Votes	%	±%
Liberal and Country	Herbert Michael	2,987	57.3	+14.0
Labor	Herman Dolling	2,227	42.7	−7.3
Total formal votes		5,214	97.9	−1.3
Informal votes		110	2.1	+1.3
Turnout		5,324	91.6	+19.9
Liberal and Country gain from Labor		Swing	N/A	

=== Mitcham ===
1944 South Australian state election: Mitcham
Party	Candidate	Votes	%	±%
Liberal and Country	Henry Dunks	9,303	59.9	−4.1
Labor	Victor Doble	6,236	40.1	+20.4
Total formal votes		15,539	97.0	−1.6
Informal votes		486	3.0	+1.6
Turnout		16,025	87.5	+36.7
Liberal and Country hold		Swing	N/A	

=== Mount Gambier ===
1944 South Australian state election: Mount Gambier
Party	Candidate	Votes	%	±%
Independent	John Fletcher	4,180	66.3	+19.9
Labor	Russell Walters	2,120	33.7	+2.5
Total formal votes		6,300	98.0	−0.7
Informal votes		128	2.0	+0.7
Turnout		6,428	89.6	+23.1
Independent hold		Swing	+0.7	

=== Murray ===
1944 South Australian state election: Murray
Party	Candidate	Votes	%	±%
Labor	Richard McKenzie	3,177	57.2	+41.1
Liberal and Country	John Cowan	2,068	37.2	+7.9
Independent	James Venning	308	5.6	+5.6
Total formal votes		5,553	97.4	−1.2
Informal votes		146	2.6	+1.2
Turnout		5,699	90.5	+25.9
Labor gain from Independent Labor		Swing	N/A	

=== Newcastle ===
1944 South Australian state election: Newcastle
Party	Candidate	Votes	%	±%
Liberal and Country	George Jenkins	2,229	60.0	−40.0
Labor	Jock Pick	1,486	40.0	+40.0
Total formal votes		3,715	97.8	
Informal votes		84	2.2	
Turnout		3,799	83.3	
Liberal and Country hold		Swing	N/A	

=== Norwood ===
1944 South Australian state election: Norwood
Party	Candidate	Votes	%	±%
Labor	Frank Nieass	8,212	53.6	+6.3
Liberal and Country	Roy Moir	7,095	46.4	−6.3
Total formal votes		15,307	95.3	−2.6
Informal votes		747	4.7	+2.6
Turnout		16,054	88.4	+42.8
Labor gain from Liberal and Country		Swing	+4.3	

=== Onkaparinga ===
1944 South Australian state election: Onkaparinga
Party	Candidate	Votes	%	±%
Liberal and Country	Howard Shannon	3,270	53.9	+10.9
Labor	Cyril Hasse	2,792	46.1	+11.7
Total formal votes		6,062	96.8	−1.7
Informal votes		199	3.2	+1.7
Turnout		6,261	88.9	+26.1
Liberal and Country hold		Swing	+2.5	

=== Port Adelaide ===
1944 South Australian state election: Port Adelaide
Party	Candidate	Votes	%	±%
Labor	James Stephens	unopposed		
Labor hold		Swing		

=== Port Pirie ===
1944 South Australian state election: Port Pirie
Party	Candidate	Votes	%	±%
Labor	Andrew Lacey	unopposed		
Labor hold		Swing		

=== Prospect ===
1944 South Australian state election: Prospect
Party	Candidate	Votes	%	±%
Liberal and Country	Elder Whittle	7,726	45.9	−9.2
Labor	Bert Shard	6,448	38.3	+3.7
Communist	Alan Finger	2,644	15.7	+15.7
Total formal votes		16,818	97.5	−1.2
Informal votes		433	2.5	+1.2
Turnout		17,251	89.9	+37.8
Two-party-preferred result
Labor	Bert Shard	8,793	52.3	
Liberal and Country	Elder Whittle	8,025	47.7	
Labor gain from Liberal and Country		Swing	N/A	

=== Ridley ===
1944 South Australian state election: Ridley
Party	Candidate	Votes	%	±%
Independent	Tom Stott	3,653	74.1	+12.8
Labor	Leonard Seymour	1,278	25.9	+11.8
Total formal votes		4,931	98.2	−0.4
Informal votes		92	1.8	+0.4
Turnout		5,023	89.9	+27.8
Independent hold		Swing	N/A	

=== Rocky River ===
1944 South Australian state election: Rocky River
Party	Candidate	Votes	%	±%
Liberal and Country	John Lyons	3,091	71.4	−1.0
Labor	Leonard Wilcott	1,237	28.6	+1.0
Total formal votes		4,328	96.9	−1.1
Informal votes		136	3.1	+1.1
Turnout		4,464	89.8	+28.2
Liberal and Country hold		Swing	−1.0	

=== Semaphore ===
1944 South Australian state election: Semaphore
Party	Candidate	Votes	%	±%
Labor	Albert Thompson	unopposed		
Labor hold		Swing		

=== Stanley ===
1944 South Australian state election: Stanley
Party	Candidate	Votes	%	±%
Labor	Percy Quirke	2,645	57.7	+4.7
Liberal and Country	Gordon Bails	1,940	42.3	−4.7
Total formal votes		4,585	98.3	−0.2
Informal votes		81	1.7	+0.2
Turnout		4,666	91.4	+20.8
Labor hold		Swing	+4.7	

=== Stirling ===
1944 South Australian state election: Stirling
Party	Candidate	Votes	%	±%
Liberal and Country	Herbert Dunn	2,996	54.2	+25.2
Labor	J McTier	1,284	23.2	+23.2
Independent	S D Bruce	1,248	22.6	+22.6
Total formal votes		5,528	97.4	−1.3
Informal votes		148	2.6	+1.3
Turnout		5,676	91.1	+33.5
Liberal and Country gain from Independent		Swing	N/A	

- Sitting MP for Stirling, Herbert Dunn had been elected as an independent in the previous election, but joined the LCL before this election.

=== Stuart ===
1944 South Australian state election: Stuart
Party	Candidate	Votes	%	±%
Labor	Lindsay Riches	unopposed		
Labor hold		Swing		

=== Thebarton ===
1944 South Australian state election: Thebarton
Party	Candidate	Votes	%	±%
Labor	Fred Walsh	unopposed		
Labor gain from Independent		Swing	N/A	

=== Torrens ===
1944 South Australian state election: Torrens
Party	Candidate	Votes	%	±%
Labor	Herbert Baldock	8,635	51.0	+22.1
Liberal and Country	Shirley Jeffries	8,308	49.0	−4.3
Total formal votes		16,943	96.1	−2.2
Informal votes		688	3.9	+2.2
Turnout		17,631	87.2	+33.8
Labor gain from Liberal and Country		Swing	N/A	

=== Unley ===
1944 South Australian state election: Unley
Party	Candidate	Votes	%	±%
Liberal and Country	Colin Dunnage	9,051	54.2	+13.9
Labor	Alexander Saint	7,657	45.8	+45.8
Total formal votes		16,708	96.3	−1.9
Informal votes		645	3.7	+1.9
Turnout		17,353	87.5	+37.5
Liberal and Country hold		Swing	N/A	

=== Victoria ===
1944 South Australian state election: Victoria
Party	Candidate	Votes	%	±%
Liberal and Country	Vernon Petherick	3,530	49.9	+12.9
Labor	Jim Corcoran	3,244	45.9	+11.8
Independent	John Gartner	296	4.2	+4.2
Total formal votes		7,070	98.1	−0.2
Informal votes		135	1.9	+0.2
Turnout		7,205	90.1	+29.2
Two-party-preferred result
Liberal and Country	Vernon Petherick	3,687	52.1	−4.6
Labor	Jim Corcoran	3,383	47.9	+4.6
Liberal and Country hold		Swing	−4.6	

=== Wallaroo ===
1944 South Australian state election: Wallaroo
Party	Candidate	Votes	%	±%
Labor	Robert Richards	2,896	64.8	−35.2
Independent	Leslie Heath	1,573	35.2	+35.2
Total formal votes		4,469	97.9	
Informal votes		93	2.1	
Turnout		4,562	90.9	
Labor hold		Swing	N/A	

=== Yorke Peninsula ===
1944 South Australian state election: Yorke Peninsula
Party	Candidate	Votes	%	±%
Liberal and Country	Cecil Hincks	unopposed		
Liberal and Country hold		Swing		

=== Young ===
1944 South Australian state election: Young
Party	Candidate	Votes	%	±%
Liberal and Country	Robert Nicholls	2,576	69.4	−30.6
Labor	Ernest Allen	1,134	30.6	+30.6
Total formal votes		3,710	97.4	
Informal votes		100	2.6	
Turnout		3,810	91.4	
Liberal and Country hold		Swing	N/A	

== See also ==
- Candidates of the 1944 South Australian state election
- Members of the South Australian House of Assembly, 1944–1947
