= Electoral results for the district of Wallaroo =

South Australian district election results

This is a list of election results for the electoral district of Wallaroo in South Australian elections.

== Members for Wallaroo ==
Three members (1875–1884)
Member	Party	Term	Member	Party	Term	Member	Party	Term
John Duncan		1875–1878	John Richards		1875–1878	M. H. Madge		1875–1875
John Duncan		1875–1878	John Richards		1875–1878	R. D. Ross		1875–1884
C. S. Hare		1878–1881	Luke Furner		1878–1884	R. D. Ross		1875–1884
W. H. Beaglehole		1881–1884	Luke Furner		1878–1884	R. D. Ross		1875–1884

Two members (1884–1902)
Member	Party	Term	Member	Party	Term
H. A. Grainger		1884–1885	Luke Furner		1884–1890
David Bews		1885–1891	Luke Furner		1884–1890
David Bews		1885–1891	H. A. Grainger		1890–1901
Richard Hooper	Labor	1891–1902	H. A. Grainger		1890–1901
Richard Hooper	Labor	1891–1902	John Verran	Labor	1901–1902

Three members (1902–1915)
Member	Party	Term	Member	Party	Term	Member	Party	Term
Peter Allen		1902–1912	John Verran	Labor	1902–1915	John Shannon		1902–1905
Peter Allen		1902–1912	John Verran	Labor	1902–1915	A. E. Winter	Labor	1905–1912
J. F. Herbert	Labor	1912–1915	John Verran	Labor	1902–1915	J. A. Southwood	Labor	1912–1915

Two members (1915–1938)
Member	Party	Term	Member	Party	Term
J. F. Herbert	Labor	1915–1917	John Verran	Labor	1915–1917
J. F. Herbert	National	1917–1918	John Verran	National	1917–1918
Robert Richards	Labor	1918–1931	John Pedler	Labor	1918–1931
Robert Richards	Parliamentary Labor	1931–1934	John Pedler	Parliamentary Labor	1931–1934
Robert Richards	Labor	1934–1938	John Pedler	Labor	1934–1938

Single-member (1938–1970)
Member	Party	Term
Robert Richards	Labor	1938–1950
Hughie McAlees	Labor	1950–1956
Leslie Heath	Liberal and Country	1956–1957
Lloyd Hughes	Labor	1957–1970

== Election results ==
=== Elections in the 1960s ===
1968 South Australian state election: Wallaroo
Party	Candidate	Votes	%	±%
Labor	Lloyd Hughes	2,899	52.0	−7.1
Liberal and Country	Keith Russack	2,612	46.8	+5.9
Democratic Labor	John McMahon	67	1.2	+1.2
Total formal votes		5,578	98.7	+0.6
Informal votes		74	1.3	−0.6
Turnout		5,652	96.9	+0.4
Two-party-preferred result
Labor	Lloyd Hughes	2,909	52.2	−6.9
Liberal and Country	Keith Russack	2,669	47.8	+6.9
Labor hold		Swing	−6.9	

1965 South Australian state election: Wallaroo
Party	Candidate	Votes	%	±%
Labor	Lloyd Hughes	3,346	59.1	−3.8
Liberal and Country	Clarence Green	2,313	40.9	+3.8
Total formal votes		5,659	98.1	−0.7
Informal votes		112	1.9	+0.7
Turnout		5,771	96.5	−0.1
Labor hold		Swing	−3.8	

1962 South Australian state election: Wallaroo
Party	Candidate	Votes	%	±%
Labor	Lloyd Hughes	3,784	62.9	+4.0
Liberal and Country	Arthur Philbey	2,231	37.1	−4.0
Total formal votes		6,015	98.8	−0.1
Informal votes		71	1.2	+0.1
Turnout		6,086	96.6	−0.3
Labor hold		Swing	+4.0	

=== Elections in the 1950s ===
1959 South Australian state election: Wallaroo
Party	Candidate	Votes	%	±%
Labor	Lloyd Hughes	3,615	58.9	+14.3
Liberal and Country	Clifford Dunstone	2,519	41.1	−6.1
Total formal votes		6,134	98.9	−0.1
Informal votes		65	1.1	+0.1
Turnout		6,199	96.9	+0.6
Labor gain from Liberal and Country		Swing	+10.9	

1956 South Australian state election: Wallaroo
Party	Candidate	Votes	%	±%
Liberal and Country	Leslie Heath	2,971	47.2	
Labor	Robert Butler	2,808	44.6	
Independent	Arthur Clarke	515	8.2	
Total formal votes		6,294	99.0	
Informal votes		62	1.0	
Turnout		6,356	96.3	
Two-party-preferred result
Liberal and Country	Leslie Heath	3,271	52.0	
Labor	Robert Butler	3,023	48.0	
Liberal and Country gain from Labor		Swing		

1953 South Australian state election: Wallaroo
Party	Candidate	Votes	%	±%
Labor	Hughie McAlees	unopposed		
Labor hold		Swing		

1950 South Australian state election: Wallaroo
Party	Candidate	Votes	%	±%
Labor	Hughie McAlees	2,539	51.0	−10.1
Liberal and Country	Leslie Heath	2,050	41.2	+2.3
Independent	Spence Crosby	392	7.9	+7.9
Total formal votes		4,981	97.4	−0.9
Informal votes		131	2.6	+0.9
Turnout		5,112	95.2	+0.1
Two-party-preferred result
Labor	Hughie McAlees		58.1	−3.0
Liberal and Country	Leslie Heath		41.9	+3.0
Labor hold		Swing	−3.0	

- Two party preferred vote was estimated.

=== Elections in the 1940s ===
1947 South Australian state election: Wallaroo
Party	Candidate	Votes	%	±%
Labor	Robert Richards	2,968	61.1	−3.7
Liberal and Country	Leslie Heath	1,888	38.9	+38.9
Total formal votes		4,856	98.3	+0.4
Informal votes		84	1.7	−0.4
Turnout		4,940	95.1	+4.2
Labor hold		Swing	N/A	

1944 South Australian state election: Wallaroo
Party	Candidate	Votes	%	±%
Labor	Robert Richards	2,896	64.8	−35.2
Independent	Leslie Heath	1,573	35.2	+35.2
Total formal votes		4,469	97.9	
Informal votes		93	2.1	
Turnout		4,562	90.9	
Labor hold		Swing	N/A	

1941 South Australian state election: Wallaroo
Party	Candidate	Votes	%	±%
Labor	Robert Richards	unopposed		
Labor hold		Swing		

=== Elections in the 1930s ===
1938 South Australian state election: Wallaroo
Party	Candidate	Votes	%	±%
Labor	Robert Richards	2,475	54.2	
Independent	Cecil Chapman	2,091	45.8	
Total formal votes		4,566	98.5	
Informal votes		67	1.5	
Turnout		4,633	79.7	
Labor hold		Swing		
