= Results of the 1947 South Australian state election (House of Assembly) =

South Australian state election, 8 March 1947 House of Assembly << 1944–1950 >>
Enrolled voters	306,059				
Votes cast	285,765		Turnout	{{{turnout %}}}	+4.84%
Informal votes	10,366		Informal	3.63%	+0.41%
Summary of votes by party
Party	Primary votes	%	Swing	Seats	Change
Labor	133,959	48.6%	+6.12%	13	– 3
Liberal and Country	111,216	40.3%	–5.46%	23	+ 3
Communist	8,178	2.9%	+0.90%	0	± 0
Independent	17,083	6.2%	–0.43%	3	± 0
Independent Labor	4,963	1.80%	–0.45%	0	± 0
Total	275,399			39	
Two-party-preferred
Liberal and Country		52.00%	+5.30%		
Labor		48.00%	–5.30%		

This is a list of House of Assembly results for the 1947 South Australian state election.

== Results by electoral district ==
=== Adelaide ===
1947 South Australian state election: Adelaide
Party	Candidate	Votes	%	±%
Labor	Herbert George	6,556	50.7	+13.5
Independent	Doug Bardolph	4,963	38.3	−5.2
Communist	Alfred Watt	1,425	11.0	−8.4
Total formal votes		12,944	89.7	−3.4
Informal votes		1,490	10.3	+3.4
Turnout		14,434	89.5	+6.5
Labor hold		Swing	N/A	

- Preferences were not distributed.

=== Albert ===
1947 South Australian state election: Albert
Party	Candidate	Votes	%	±%
Liberal and Country	Malcolm McIntosh	unopposed		
Liberal and Country hold		Swing		

=== Alexandra ===
1947 South Australian state election: Alexandra
Party	Candidate	Votes	%	±%
Liberal and Country	Herbert Hudd	4,502	65.9	−34.1
Labor	Albert Taverner	1,442	21.1	+21.1
Independent	Ethel Wache	887	13.0	+13.0
Total formal votes		6,831	97.5	
Informal votes		173	2.5	
Turnout		7,004	95.1	
Liberal and Country hold		Swing	N/A	

- Preferences were not distributed.

=== Angas ===
1947 South Australian state election: Angas
Party	Candidate	Votes	%	±%
Liberal and Country	Berthold Teusner	3,960	70.3	+17.7
Independent	Frank Rieck	1,672	29.7	+29.7
Total formal votes		5,632	97.4	−1.4
Informal votes		152	2.6	+1.4
Turnout		5,784	96.0	+5.8
Liberal and Country hold		Swing	N/A	

=== Burnside ===
1947 South Australian state election: Burnside
Party	Candidate	Votes	%	±%
Liberal and Country	Geoffrey Clarke	unopposed		
Liberal and Country hold		Swing		

=== Burra ===
1947 South Australian state election: Burra
Party	Candidate	Votes	%	±%
Liberal and Country	George Hawker	2,566	58.5	+2.8
Labor	Michael Cronin	1,819	41.5	−2.8
Total formal votes		4,385	98.8	+1.2
Informal votes		52	1.2	−1.2
Turnout		4,437	95.3	+5.3
Liberal and Country hold		Swing	+2.8	

=== Chaffey ===
1947 South Australian state election: Chaffey
Party	Candidate	Votes	%	±%
Independent	William MacGillivray	3,795	59.3	−2.6
Labor	Robert Lambert	2,603	40.7	+2.6
Total formal votes		6,398	97.5	+0.9
Informal votes		164	2.5	−0.9
Turnout		6,562	94.1	+6.9
Independent hold		Swing	−2.6	

=== Eyre ===
1947 South Australian state election: Eyre
Party	Candidate	Votes	%	±%
Liberal and Country	Arthur Christian	unopposed		
Liberal and Country hold		Swing		

=== Flinders ===
1947 South Australian state election: Flinders
Party	Candidate	Votes	%	±%
Liberal and Country	Rex Pearson	4,205	68.6	+26.5
Labor	William Gosling	1,925	31.4	+4.7
Total formal votes		6,130	98.2	+0.7
Informal votes		112	1.8	−0.7
Turnout		6,242	93.9	+4.9
Liberal and Country hold		Swing	+9.6	

=== Frome ===
1947 South Australian state election: Frome
Party	Candidate	Votes	%	±%
Labor	Mick O'Halloran	unopposed		
Labor hold		Swing		

=== Gawler ===
1947 South Australian state election: Gawler
Party	Candidate	Votes	%	±%
Labor	Leslie Duncan	3,054	53.7	−3.0
Liberal and Country	Thomas Shanahan	2,637	46.3	+3.0
Total formal votes		5,691	98.4	+0.7
Informal votes		91	1.6	−0.7
Turnout		5,782	95.1	+4.3
Labor hold		Swing	−3.0	

=== Glenelg ===
1947 South Australian state election: Glenelg
Party	Candidate	Votes	%	±%
Liberal and Country	Baden Pattinson	11,696	60.6	+3.6
Labor	Ralph Wells	6,832	35.4	−7.6
Independent	Andrew Low	768	4.0	+4.0
Total formal votes		19,296	97.1	+0.7
Informal votes		576	2.9	−0.7
Liberal and Country hold		Swing	N/A	

- Preferences were not distributed.

=== Goodwood ===
1947 South Australian state election: Goodwood
Party	Candidate	Votes	%	±%
Labor	Frank Walsh	8,720	51.0	−8.5
Liberal and Country	Herbert Kemp	8,388	49.0	+8.5
Total formal votes		17,108	97.2	+0.7
Informal votes		489	2.8	−0.7
Turnout		17,597	93.3	+5.7
Labor hold		Swing	−8.5	

=== Gouger ===
1947 South Australian state election: Gouger
Party	Candidate	Votes	%	±%
Liberal and Country	Rufus Goldney	3,537	64.0	+13.0
Labor	John Brown	1,991	36.0	−13.0
Total formal votes		5,528	98.0	+0.1
Informal votes		110	2.0	−0.1
Turnout		5,638	95.0	+4.8
Liberal and Country hold		Swing	+13.0	

=== Gumeracha ===
1947 South Australian state election: Gumeracha
Party	Candidate	Votes	%	±%
Liberal and Country	Thomas Playford	unopposed		
Liberal and Country hold		Swing		

=== Hindmarsh ===
1947 South Australian state election: Hindmarsh
Party	Candidate	Votes	%	±%
Labor	John McInnes	16,719	87.9	−12.1
Communist	James Moss	2,306	12.1	+12.1
Total formal votes		19,025	90.9	
Informal votes		1,911	9.1	
Turnout		20,936	92.1	
Labor hold		Swing	N/A	

=== Light ===
1947 South Australian state election: Light
Party	Candidate	Votes	%	±%
Liberal and Country	Herbert Michael	3,595	66.8	+9.5
Labor	John Power	1,623	30.2	−12.5
Independent	Henry Schneider	161	3.0	+3.0
Total formal votes		5,379	97.8	−0.1
Informal votes		119	2.2	+0.1
Turnout		5,498	94.9	+3.3
Liberal and Country hold		Swing	N/A	

- Preferences were not distributed.

=== Mitcham ===
1947 South Australian state election: Mitcham
Party	Candidate	Votes	%	±%
Liberal and Country	Henry Dunks	11,650	67.1	+7.2
Labor	John Borthwick	5,700	32.9	−7.2
Total formal votes		17,350	98.0	+1.1
Informal votes		359	2.0	−1.1
Turnout		17,709	92.9	+5.4
Liberal and Country hold		Swing	+7.2	

=== Mount Gambier ===
1947 South Australian state election: Mount Gambier
Party	Candidate	Votes	%	±%
Independent	John Fletcher	4,742	66.4	+0.1
Labor	John Shepherdson	2,396	33.6	−0.1
Total formal votes		7,138	98.2	+0.2
Informal votes		128	1.8	−0.2
Turnout		7,266	94.4	+4.8
Independent hold		Swing	+0.1	

=== Murray ===
1947 South Australian state election: Murray
Party	Candidate	Votes	%	±%
Labor	Richard McKenzie	3,386	55.4	−1.8
Liberal and Country	Maurice Parish	2,731	44.6	+7.4
Total formal votes		6,117	98.5	+1.1
Informal votes		92	1.5	−1.1
Turnout		6,209	95.9	+5.4
Labor hold		Swing	N/A	

=== Newcastle ===
1947 South Australian state election: Newcastle
Party	Candidate	Votes	%	±%
Liberal and Country	George Jenkins	unopposed		
Liberal and Country hold		Swing		

=== Norwood ===
1947 South Australian state election: Norwood
Party	Candidate	Votes	%	±%
Liberal and Country	Roy Moir	8,839	51.4	+5.0
Labor	Frank Nieass	8,352	48.6	−5.0
Total formal votes		17,191	97.3	+2.0
Informal votes		469	2.7	−2.0
Turnout		17,660	93.2	+4.8
Liberal and Country gain from Labor		Swing	+5.0	

=== Onkaparinga ===
1947 South Australian state election: Onkaparinga
Party	Candidate	Votes	%	±%
Liberal and Country	Howard Shannon	3,528	50.7	−3.2
Labor	Herbert Burnley	2,349	33.8	−12.3
Independent	Frank Halleday	1,082	15.5	+15.5
Total formal votes		6,959	97.9	+1.1
Informal votes		152	2.1	−1.1
Turnout		7,111	94.7	+5.8
Liberal and Country hold		Swing	N/A	

- Preferences were not distributed.

=== Port Adelaide ===
1947 South Australian state election: Port Adelaide
Party	Candidate	Votes	%	±%
Labor	James Stephens	16,222	82.6	−17.4
Communist	Alan Finger	3,418	17.4	+17.4
Total formal votes		19,640	92.4	
Informal votes		1,613	7.6	
Turnout		21,253	93.7	
Labor hold		Swing	N/A	

=== Port Pirie ===
1947 South Australian state election: Port Pirie
Party	Candidate	Votes	%	±%
Labor	Charles Davis	unopposed		
Labor hold		Swing		

=== Prospect ===
1947 South Australian state election: Prospect
Party	Candidate	Votes	%	±%
Liberal and Country	Elder Whittle	10,001	54.3	+8.4
Labor	Bert Shard	8,433	45.7	+7.4
Total formal votes		18,434	97.8	+0.3
Informal votes		412	2.2	−0.3
Turnout		18,846	93.8	+3.9
Liberal and Country gain from Labor		Swing	+6.6	

=== Ridley ===
1947 South Australian state election: Ridley
Party	Candidate	Votes	%	±%
Independent	Tom Stott	3,976	75.2	+1.1
Labor	John Lloyd	1,313	24.8	−1.1
Total formal votes		5,289	97.7	−0.5
Informal votes		127	2.3	+0.5
Turnout		5,416	96.1	+6.2
Independent hold		Swing	+1.1	

=== Rocky River ===
1947 South Australian state election: Rocky River
Party	Candidate	Votes	%	±%
Liberal and Country	John Lyons	unopposed		
Liberal and Country hold		Swing		

=== Semaphore ===
1947 South Australian state election: Semaphore
Party	Candidate	Votes	%	±%
Labor	Harold Tapping	unopposed		
Labor hold		Swing		

=== Stanley ===
1947 South Australian state election: Stanley
Party	Candidate	Votes	%	±%
Labor	Percy Quirke	2,444	50.1	−7.6
Liberal and Country	Gordon Bails	1,512	31.0	−11.3
Liberal and Country	Clive Hannaford	923	18.9	+18.9
Total formal votes		4,879	98.9	+0.6
Informal votes		55	1.1	−0.6
Turnout		4,934	95.5	+4.1
Labor hold		Swing	N/A	

- Preferences were not distributed.

=== Stirling ===
1947 South Australian state election: Stirling
Party	Candidate	Votes	%	±%
Liberal and Country	Herbert Dunn	unopposed		
Liberal and Country hold		Swing		

=== Stuart ===
1947 South Australian state election: Stuart
Party	Candidate	Votes	%	±%
Labor	Lindsay Riches	7,227	87.5	−12.5
Communist	Edward Robertson	1,029	12.5	+12.5
Total formal votes		8,256	96.2	
Informal votes		328	3.8	
Turnout		8,584	85.8	
Labor hold		Swing	N/A	

=== Thebarton ===
1947 South Australian state election: Thebarton
Party	Candidate	Votes	%	±%
Labor	Fred Walsh	unopposed		
Labor hold		Swing		

=== Torrens ===
1947 South Australian state election: Torrens
Party	Candidate	Votes	%	±%
Liberal and Country	Shirley Jeffries	10,185	55.0	+6.0
Labor	Herbert Baldock	8,317	45.0	−6.0
Total formal votes		18,502	97.3	+1.2
Informal votes		505	2.7	−1.2
Turnout		19,007	92.6	+5.4
Liberal and Country gain from Labor		Swing	N/A	

=== Unley ===
1947 South Australian state election: Unley
Party	Candidate	Votes	%	±%
Liberal and Country	Colin Dunnage	10,680	59.1	+4.9
Labor	Douglas Finlayson	7,401	40.9	−4.9
Total formal votes		18,081	97.5	+1.2
Informal votes		457	2.5	−1.2
Turnout		18,538	93.1	+5.6
Liberal and Country hold		Swing	+4.9	

=== Victoria ===
1947 South Australian state election: Victoria
Party	Candidate	Votes	%	±%
Liberal and Country	Roy McLachlan	4,193	50.2	+0.3
Labor	Jim Corcoran	4,167	49.8	+3.9
Total formal votes		8,360	98.3	+0.2
Informal votes		146	1.7	−0.2
Turnout		8,506	96.8	+6.7
Liberal and Country hold		Swing	−1.9	

=== Wallaroo ===
1947 South Australian state election: Wallaroo
Party	Candidate	Votes	%	±%
Labor	Robert Richards	2,968	61.1	−3.7
Liberal and Country	Leslie Heath	1,888	38.9	+38.9
Total formal votes		4,856	98.3	+0.4
Informal votes		84	1.7	−0.4
Turnout		4,940	95.1	+4.2
Labor hold		Swing	N/A	

=== Yorke Peninsula ===
1947 South Australian state election: Yorke Peninsula
Party	Candidate	Votes	%	±%
Liberal and Country	Cecil Hincks	unopposed		
Liberal and Country hold		Swing		

=== Young ===
1947 South Australian state election: Young
Party	Candidate	Votes	%	±%
Liberal and Country	Robert Nicholls	unopposed		
Liberal and Country hold		Swing		

== See also ==
- Candidates of the 1947 South Australian state election
- Members of the South Australian House of Assembly, 1947–1950
