= Candidates of the 1947 South Australian state election =

The 1947 South Australian state election was held on 8 March 1947.

== Retiring Members ==
=== Labor ===
- Bob Dale, MHA (Adelaide)

=== LCL ===
- Archibald McDonald, MHA (Burra)
- Frank Smith, MHA (Glenelg)

== House of Assembly ==
Sitting members are shown in bold text. Successful candidates are highlighted in the relevant colour. Where there is possible confusion, an asterisk (*) is also used.

Electorate	Held by	Labor candidate	LCL candidate	Other candidates
Adelaide	Labor	Herbert George		Doug Bardolph (Ind.); Alfred Watt (Comm)
Albert	LCL		**Malcolm McIntosh**	
Alexandra	LCL	Albert Taverner	**Herbert Hudd**	Ethel Wache (Ind.)
Angas	LCL		**Berthold Teusner**	Frank Rieck (Ind)
Burnside	LCL		**Geoffrey Clarke**	
Burra	LCL	Michael Cronin	George Hawker	
Chaffey	Independent	Robert Lambert		**William MacGillivray** (Ind)
Eyre	LCL		**Arthur Christian**	
Flinders	LCL		**Rex Pearson**	
Frome	Labor	**Mick O'Halloran**		
Gawler	Labor	**Leslie Duncan**	Thomas Shanahan	
Glenelg	LCL	Ralph Wells	Baden Pattinson	Andrew Low (Ind)
Goodwood	Labor	**Frank Walsh**	Herbert Kemp	
Gouger	LCL	John Brown	**Rufus Goldney**	
Gumeracha	LCL		**Thomas Playford**	
Hindmarsh	Labor	**John McInnes**		James Moss (Comm)
Light	LCL	John Power	**Herbert Michael**	Henry Schneider (Ind)
Mitcham	LCL	John Borthwick	**Henry Dunks**	
Mount Gambier	Independent	John Shepherdson		**John Fletcher** (Ind)
Murray	Labor	**Richard McKenzie**	Maurice Parish	
Newcastle	LCL		**George Jenkins**	
Norwood	Labor	**Frank Nieass**	Roy Moir	
Onkaparinga	LCL	Herbert Burnley	**Howard Shannon**	Frank Halleday (Ind)
Port Adelaide	Labor	**James Stephens**		Alan Finger (Comm)
Port Pirie	Labor	**Charles Davis**		
Prospect	Labor	**Bert Shard**	Elder Whittle	
Ridley	Independent	John Lloyd		**Tom Stott** (Ind.)
Rocky River	LCL		**John Lyons**	
Semaphore	Labor	**Harold Tapping**		
Stanley	Labor	**Percy Quirke**	Gordon Bails; Clive Hannaford	
Stirling	LCL		**Herbert Dunn**	
Stuart	Labor	**Lindsay Riches**		Edward Robertson (Comm)
Thebarton	Labor	**Fred Walsh**		
Torrens	Labor	**Herbert Baldock**	Shirley Jeffries	
Unley	LCL	Douglas Finlayson	**Colin Dunnage**	
Victoria	Labor	**Jim Corcoran**	Roy McLachlan	
Wallaroo	Labor	**Robert Richards**	Leslie Heath	
Yorke Peninsula	LCL		**Cecil Hincks**	
Young	LCL		**Robert Nicholls**	

== Legislative Council ==
Sitting members are shown in bold text. Successful candidates are highlighted in the relevant colour and identified by an asterisk (*).

District	Held by	Labor candidates	LCL candidates	Other candidates
Central No. 1	2 Labor	**Ken Bardolph***; **Oscar Oates***		George Yates (Ind.)
Central No. 2	2 LCL	Michael Smedley; Colin Evans; William Ahern	**Collier Cudmore***; **Ernest Anthoney***; Frank Perry	
Midland	2 LCL		**Alexander Melrose***; Douglas Gordon*	**Ernest Castine** (Ind.)
Northern	1 Labor; 1 LCL	**James Beerworth**; Ron Loveday	**Percy Blesing***; William Robinson*	
Southern	2 LCL	Charles Lloyd; Frank Staniford	**Norman Brookman***; **Jack Bice***	
