= Candidates of the 1944 South Australian state election =

The 1944 South Australian state election was held on 29 April 1944.

== Retiring Members ==
=== Labor ===
- Sydney McHugh, MHA (Light)

=== Liberal and Country ===
- David Gordon, MLC (Midland)
- George Ritchie, MLC (Northern)
- John Cowan, MLC (Southern)

=== Independent ===
- Joseph Anderson, MLC (Central No.1)

== House of Assembly ==
Sitting members are shown in bold text. Successful candidates are highlighted in the relevant colour. Where there is possible confusion, an asterisk (*) is also used.

| Electorate | Held by | Labor candidate | LCL candidate | Other candidates |
|---|---|---|---|---|
| Adelaide | Independent | Bob Dale | | **Doug Bardolph** (Ind.); Alfred Watt (Comm) |
| Albert | LCL | John Cronin | **Malcolm McIntosh** | J P Ryan (Ind.) |
| Alexandra | LCL | | **Herbert Hudd** | |
| Angas | LCL | William Robinson | **Berthold Teusner** | William Haese (Ind.) |
| Burnside | LCL | Frank White | **Geoffrey Clarke** | |
| Burra | LCL | Ellis Bristow | **Archibald McDonald** | |
| Chaffey | Independent | Robert Curren | | **William MacGillivray** (Ind.) |
| Eyre | LCL | William Gosling | **Arthur Christian** | Oliver Eatts (Ind.) |
| Flinders | LCL | John O'Leary | **Rex Pearson** | Edward Craigie (STL); Janette Octoman (Ind.) |
| Frome | Labor | **Mick O'Halloran** | | |
| Gawler | Labor | **Leslie Duncan** | Elliott Day | |
| Glenelg | LCL | John Fitzgerald | **Frank Smith** | |
| Goodwood | Labor | **Frank Walsh** | Archibald MacMillan | |
| Gouger | Labor | **Horace Bowden** | Rufus Goldney | |
| Gumeracha | LCL | Wilfred Holmes | **Thomas Playford** | |
| Hindmarsh | Labor | **John McInnes** | | |
| Light | Labor | Herman Dolling | Herbert Michael | |
| Mitcham | LCL | Victor Doble | **Henry Dunks** | |
| Mount Gambier | Independent | Russell Walters | | **John Fletcher** (Ind.) |
| Murray | Labor | **Richard McKenzie** | John Cowan | James Venning (Ind.) |
| Newcastle | LCL | Jock Pick | **George Jenkins** | |
| Norwood | LCL | Frank Nieass | **Roy Moir** | |
| Onkaparinga | LCL | Cyril Hasse | **Howard Shannon** | |
| Port Adelaide | Labor | **James Stephens** | | |
| Port Pirie | Labor | **Andrew Lacey** | | |
| Prospect | LCL | Bert Shard | **Elder Whittle** | Alan Finger (Comm.) |
| Ridley | Independent | Leonard Seymour | | **Tom Stott** (Ind.) |
| Rocky River | LCL | Leonard Wilcott | **John Lyons** | |
| Semaphore | Labor | **Albert Thompson** | | |
| Stanley | Labor | **Percy Quirke** | Gordon Bails | |
| Stirling | LCL | J McTier | **Herbert Dunn** | S D Bruce (Ind.) |
| Stuart | Labor | **Lindsay Riches** | | |
| Thebarton | Labor | **Fred Walsh** | | |
| Torrens | LCL | Herbert Baldock | **Shirley Jeffries** | |
| Unley | LCL | Alexander Saint | **Colin Dunnage** | |
| Victoria | LCL | Jim Corcoran | **Vernon Petherick** | John Gartner (Ind.) |
| Wallaroo | Labor | **Robert Richards** | Leslie Heath | |
| Yorke Peninsula | LCL | | **Cecil Hincks** | |
| Young | LCL | Ernest Allen | **Robert Nicholls** | |

== Legislative Council ==
Sitting members are shown in bold text. Successful candidates are highlighted in the relevant colour and identified by an asterisk (*).

| District | Held by | Labor candidates | LCL candidates | Other candidates |
|---|---|---|---|---|
| Central No. 1 | 1 Labor; 1 Independent | **Frank Condon***; Bert Hoare* | | |
| Central No. 2 | 2 LCL | A B Kelly; W C C Bertram | **Edward Holden***; **James Sandford*** | |
| Midland | 2 LCL | A J Marrett; Laurie Ellis | **Walter Duncan***; Reginald Rudall* | |
| Northern | 2 LCL | William Threadgold; E J McQuoid | **Lyell McEwin***; Harry Edmonds* | |
| Southern | 1 LCL; 1 Independent | J C Callaghan; J J O'Grady | Norman Jude*; Leslie Harold Densley* | **Frank Halleday** (Ind.); Clement Wells (Ind.) |
