= Results of the 1941 South Australian state election (House of Assembly) =

South Australian state election, 29 March 1941 House of Assembly << 1938–1944 >>
Enrolled voters	339,263				
Votes cast	171,978		Turnout	50.69%	-12.62%
Informal votes	3,365		Informal	1.96%	-0.20%
Summary of votes by party
Party	Primary votes	%	Swing	Seats	Change
Liberal and Country	63,317	37.55%	+4.12%	20	+ 5
Labor	56,062	33.25%	+7.08%	11	+ 2
Independent	41,487	24.60%	–9.48%	5	– 7
Independent Labor	5,090	3.02%	–2.63%	2	± 0
Independent Liberal	2,657	1.58%	*	1	+ 1
Total	168,613			39	

This is a list of House of Assembly results for the 1941 South Australian state election.

== Results by electoral district ==
=== Adelaide ===
1941 South Australian state election: Adelaide
Party	Candidate	Votes	%	±%
Independent	Doug Bardolph	2,903	57.2	+31.4
Labor	Bob Dale	1,645	32.4	+18.8
Independent	Tom Garland	530	10.4	+10.4
Total formal votes		5,078	95.9	+1.0
Informal votes		216	4.1	−1.0
Turnout		5,294	37.0	−27.3
Independent hold		Swing	N/A	

- Preferences were not distributed.

=== Albert ===
1941 South Australian state election: Albert
Party	Candidate	Votes	%	±%
Liberal and Country	Malcolm McIntosh	2,059	62.2	+7.6
Independent	Alfred Parker	664	20.1	+20.1
Independent	John Cronin	588	17.8	+17.8
Total formal votes		3,311	98.4	−0.2
Informal votes		54	1.6	+0.2
Turnout		3,365	60.5	−11.4
Liberal and Country hold		Swing	N/A	

- Preferences were not distributed.

=== Alexandra ===
1941 South Australian state election: Alexandra
Party	Candidate	Votes	%	±%
Liberal and Country	Herbert Hudd	unopposed		
Liberal and Country hold		Swing		

=== Angas ===
1941 South Australian state election: Angas
Party	Candidate	Votes	%	±%
Liberal and Country	Reginald Rudall	1,842	50.2	+2.9
Independent	William Haese	1,105	30.1	+18.8
Labor	Johann Schulz	723	19.7	+3.9
Total formal votes		3,670	98.3	+1.2
Informal votes		63	1.7	−1.2
Turnout		3,733	64.0	−10.9
Liberal and Country hold		Swing	N/A	

- Preferences were not distributed.

=== Burnside ===
1941 South Australian state election: Burnside
Party	Candidate	Votes	%	±%
Liberal and Country	Charles Abbott	5,652	73.7	+26.6
Labor	Stanley Pyle	1,387	18.1	+3.5
Independent	Edgar Chaston	628	8.2	+8.2
Total formal votes		7,667	98.1	−0.2
Informal votes		148	1.9	+0.2
Turnout		7,815	46.8	−13.3
Liberal and Country hold		Swing	N/A	

- Preferences were not distributed.

=== Burra ===
1941 South Australian state election: Burra
Party	Candidate	Votes	%	±%
Liberal and Country	Archibald McDonald	1,744	58.1	+19.0
Labor	Thomas Canny	1,260	41.9	+11.7
Total formal votes		3,004	98.3	−0.5
Informal votes		53	1.7	+0.5
Turnout		3,057	61.5	−13.8
Liberal and Country hold		Swing	−0.9	

=== Chaffey ===
1941 South Australian state election: Chaffey
Party	Candidate	Votes	%	±%
Independent	William MacGillivray	1,723	63.6	+33.9
Labor	Robert Curren	985	36.4	+20.6
Total formal votes		2,708	97.5	+1.7
Informal votes		70	2.5	−1.7
Turnout		2,778	46.2	−13.5
Independent hold		Swing	+4.0	

=== Eyre ===
1941 South Australian state election: Eyre
Party	Candidate	Votes	%	±%
Liberal and Country	Arthur Christian	1,839	66.0	+15.4
Independent	James Moore	949	34.0	+34.0
Total formal votes		2,788	97.9	+1.0
Informal votes		59	2.1	−1.0
Turnout		2,847	48.8	−14.7
Liberal and Country hold		Swing	N/A	

=== Flinders ===
1941 South Australian state election: Flinders
Party	Candidate	Votes	%	±%
Single Tax League	Edward Craigie	1,301	38.0	+3.1
Liberal and Country	Rex Pearson	1,169	34.1	+3.5
Labor	Richard Poole	958	28.0	+1.1
Total formal votes		3,428	99.1	+1.5
Informal votes		30	0.9	−1.5
Turnout		3,458	55.2	−14.7
Two-candidate-preferred result
Liberal and Country	Rex Pearson	1,831	53.4	+14.0
Single Tax League	Edward Craigie	1,597	46.6	−14.0
Liberal and Country gain from Single Tax League		Swing	+14.0	

=== Frome ===
1941 South Australian state election: Frome
Party	Candidate	Votes	%	±%
Labor	Mick O'Halloran	unopposed		
Labor hold		Swing		

=== Gawler ===
1941 South Australian state election: Gawler
Party	Candidate	Votes	%	±%
Liberal and Country	Francis Waddy	1,534	39.7	+12.8
Labor	Leslie Duncan	1,243	32.2	+3.2
Independent	William Duggan	1,083	28.1	+0.4
Total formal votes		3,860	99.0	+1.7
Informal votes		39	1.0	−1.7
Turnout		3,899	68.9	−6.0
Two-party-preferred result
Labor	Leslie Duncan	2,046	53.0	−7.7
Liberal and Country	Francis Waddy	1,814	47.0	+7.7
Labor hold		Swing	−7.7	

=== Glenelg ===
1941 South Australian state election: Glenelg
Party	Candidate	Votes	%	±%
Liberal and Country	Frank Smith	5,232	64.8	+24.7
Labor	Sydney Gay	2,847	35.2	+15.9
Total formal votes		8,079	96.9	−1.5
Informal votes		257	3.1	+1.5
Turnout		8,336	47.6	−12.3
Liberal and Country gain from Independent		Swing	N/A	

=== Goodwood ===
1941 South Australian state election: Goodwood
Party	Candidate	Votes	%	±%
Labor	Frank Walsh	3,103	44.8	+2.8
Liberal and Country	Hartley Dall	2,094	30.2	+10.8
Independent	George Illingworth	1,732	25.0	−1.9
Total formal votes		6,929	98.4	+0.5
Informal votes		109	1.6	−0.5
Turnout		7,038	44.4	−11.2
Two-party-preferred result
Labor	Frank Walsh	3,516	50.7	+2.2
Liberal and Country	Hartley Dall	3,413	49.3	+49.3
Labor gain from Independent		Swing	N/A	

=== Gouger ===
1941 South Australian state election: Gouger
Party	Candidate	Votes	%	±%
Independent	Albert Robinson	1,728	52.0	−2.8
Liberal and Country	Hedley Chapman	1,593	48.0	+2.8
Total formal votes		3,321	98.4	0.0
Informal votes		54	1.6	0.0
Turnout		3,375	64.8	−10.0
Independent hold		Swing	−2.8	

=== Gumeracha ===
1941 South Australian state election: Gumeracha
Party	Candidate	Votes	%	±%
Liberal and Country	Thomas Playford	unopposed		
Liberal and Country hold		Swing		

=== Hindmarsh ===
1941 South Australian state election: Hindmarsh
Party	Candidate	Votes	%	±%
Labor	John McInnes	5,030	59.9	+7.2
Independent	William Stratton	2,047	24.4	+24.4
Independent	Bessie Mountford	1,318	15.7	+15.7
Total formal votes		8,395	97.4	−0.6
Informal votes		228	2.6	+0.6
Turnout		8,623	45.7	−8.5
Labor hold		Swing	N/A	

- Preferences were not distributed.

=== Light ===
1941 South Australian state election: Light
Party	Candidate	Votes	%	±%
Labor	Sydney McHugh	2,152	50.0	+38.9
Liberal and Country	Herbert Michael	1,865	43.3	−5.6
Independent	Laurie Ellis	286	6.7	+6.7
Total formal votes		4,303	99.3	+1.5
Informal votes		33	0.8	−1.5
Turnout		4,336	71.7	−11.2
Labor gain from Liberal and Country		Swing	N/A	

- Preferences were not distributed.

=== Mitcham ===
1941 South Australian state election: Mitcham
Party	Candidate	Votes	%	±%
Liberal and Country	Henry Dunks	5,321	64.0	+9.8
Labor	Leonard Pilton	1,639	19.7	−1.5
Independent	Herbert Kemp	1,351	16.3	+16.3
Total formal votes		8,311	98.6	+0.1
Informal votes		118	1.4	−0.1
Turnout		8,429	50.8	−10.6
Liberal and Country hold		Swing	N/A	

- Preferences were not distributed.

=== Mount Gambier ===
1941 South Australian state election: Mount Gambier
Party	Candidate	Votes	%	±%
Independent	John Fletcher	2,093	46.4	+10.3
Labor	Francis Young	1,406	31.2	−4.8
Liberal and Country	Leonard Laslett	1,010	22.4	−5.5
Total formal votes		4,509	98.7	+0.5
Informal votes		57	1.3	−0.5
Turnout		4,566	66.5	−5.3
Two-candidate-preferred result
Independent	John Fletcher	2,958	65.6	+7.6
Labor	Francis Young	1,551	34.4	−7.6
Independent hold		Swing	+7.6	

=== Murray ===
1941 South Australian state election: Murray
Party	Candidate	Votes	%	±%
Independent Labor	Richard McKenzie	2,187	54.6	+20.5
Liberal and Country	George Morphett	1,173	29.3	−3.7
Labor	Clement Collins	647	16.1	+2.8
Total formal votes		4,007	98.6	+0.2
Informal votes		57	1.4	−0.2
Turnout		4,064	64.6	−5.1
Independent hold		Swing	N/A	

- Preferences were not distributed.

=== Newcastle ===
1941 South Australian state election: Newcastle
Party	Candidate	Votes	%	±%
Liberal and Country	George Jenkins	unopposed		
Liberal and Country hold		Swing		

=== Norwood ===
1941 South Australian state election: Norwood
Party	Candidate	Votes	%	±%
Labor	Frank Nieass	3,504	47.3	+13.6
Liberal and Country	Roy Moir	3,442	46.5	+17.6
Independent	Raymond Davis	459	6.2	+6.2
Total formal votes		7,405	97.9	+1.3
Informal votes		155	2.1	−1.3
Turnout		7,560	45.6	−11.0
Two-party-preferred result
Liberal and Country	Roy Moir	3,754	50.7	+3.7
Labor	Frank Nieass	3,651	49.3	−3.7
Liberal and Country gain from Labor		Swing	+3.7	

=== Onkaparinga ===
1941 South Australian state election: Onkaparinga
Party	Candidate	Votes	%	±%
Liberal and Country	Howard Shannon	1,876	43.0	−1.0
Labor	Cyril Hasse	1,501	34.4	+11.2
Independent Labor	Frank Staniford	988	22.6	−10.3
Total formal votes		4,365	98.5	+0.1
Informal votes		65	1.5	−0.1
Turnout		4,430	62.8	−1.0
Two-party-preferred result
Liberal and Country	Howard Shannon	2,242	51.4	+0.2
Labor	Cyril Hasse	2,123	48.6	+48.6
Liberal and Country hold		Swing	+0.2	

=== Port Adelaide ===
1941 South Australian state election: Port Adelaide
Party	Candidate	Votes	%	±%
Labor	James Stephens	5,102	75.9	+0.7
Independent	Gerard Coffey	1,622	24.1	+24.1
Total formal votes		6,724	96.6	0.0
Informal votes		235	3.4	0.0
Turnout		6,959	38.6	−14.5
Labor hold		Swing	N/A	

=== Port Pirie ===
1941 South Australian state election: Port Pirie
Party	Candidate	Votes	%	±%
Labor	Andrew Lacey	unopposed		
Labor hold		Swing		

=== Prospect ===
1941 South Australian state election: Prospect
Party	Candidate	Votes	%	±%
Liberal and Country	Elder Whittle	4,916	55.1	+8.8
Labor	Thomas Lawton	3,088	34.6	+5.2
Independent	Marcus Dodd	914	10.3	+10.3
Total formal votes		8,918	98.7	+0.1
Informal votes		120	1.3	−0.1
Turnout		9,038	52.1	−10.8
Liberal and Country hold		Swing	N/A	

- Preferences were not distributed.

=== Ridley ===
1941 South Australian state election: Ridley
Party	Candidate	Votes	%	±%
Independent	Tom Stott	2,330	61.3	−4.3
Labor	John Lloyd	536	14.1	+14.1
Liberal and Country	John Strangman	510	13.4	−21.0
Liberal and Country	William Blight	428	11.3	+11.3
Total formal votes		3,804	98.6	−0.6
Informal votes		53	1.4	+0.6
Turnout		3,857	62.1	−8.6
Independent hold		Swing	N/A	

- Preferences were not distributed.

=== Rocky River ===
1941 South Australian state election: Rocky River
Party	Candidate	Votes	%	±%
Liberal and Country	John Lyons	2,256	72.4	+22.2
Labor	John Henry Jenner	860	27.6	+10.2
Total formal votes		3,116	98.0	−0.4
Informal votes		65	2.0	+0.4
Turnout		3,181	61.6	−16.9
Liberal and Country hold		Swing	N/A	

=== Semaphore ===
1941 South Australian state election: Semaphore
Party	Candidate	Votes	%	±%
Labor	Albert Thompson	3,883	64.3	+5.9
Independent	H J Harden	2,158	35.7	+35.7
Total formal votes		6,041	96.6	−1.0
Informal votes		214	3.4	+1.0
Turnout		6,255	38.4	−17.8
Labor hold		Swing	N/A	

=== Stanley ===
1941 South Australian state election: Stanley
Party	Candidate	Votes	%	±%
Labor	Percy Quirke	1,961	53.0	+53.0
Liberal and Country	Henry Bohnsack	1,741	47.0	+11.9
Total formal votes		3,702	98.5	−0.5
Informal votes		56	1.5	+0.5
Turnout		3,758	70.6	−5.2
Labor gain from Liberal and Country		Swing	N/A	

=== Stirling ===
1941 South Australian state election: Stirling
Party	Candidate	Votes	%	±%
Independent	Herbert Dunn	1,306	35.9	−1.1
Liberal and Country	Alick Fuller	1,057	29.0	+0.9
Independent	Frederick Keen	1,040	28.6	+28.6
Independent	Lindsay Yelland	240	6.6	+6.6
Total formal votes		3,643	98.7	0.0
Informal votes		47	1.3	0.0
Turnout		3,690	57.6	−10.6
Two-candidate-preferred result
Independent	Herbert Dunn	2,113	58.0	+2.3
Independent	Frederick Keen	1,530	42.0	+42.0
Independent hold		Swing	N/A	

=== Stuart ===
1941 South Australian state election: Stuart
Party	Candidate	Votes	%	±%
Labor	Lindsay Riches	2,396	80.4	−19.6
Single Tax League	Charles Hobbs	585	19.6	+19.6
Total formal votes		2,981	98.3	
Informal votes		52	1.7	
Turnout		3,033	38.6	
Labor hold		Swing	N/A	

=== Thebarton ===
1941 South Australian state election: Thebarton
Party	Candidate	Votes	%	±%
Independent	Jules Langdon	3,484	52.6	+25.1
Labor	Sid O'Flaherty	3,141	47.4	+15.6
Total formal votes		6,625	97.0	+0.5
Informal votes		204	3.0	−0.5
Turnout		6,829	40.5	−14.6
Independent hold		Swing	−6.9	

=== Torrens ===
1941 South Australian state election: Torrens
Party	Candidate	Votes	%	±%
Liberal and Country	Shirley Jeffries	5,290	53.3	+8.9
Labor	J L Atkinson	2,868	28.9	−3.0
Independent	Charles Lloyd	1,760	17.7	+17.7
Total formal votes		9,918	98.3	+0.4
Informal votes		167	1.7	−0.4
Turnout		10,085	53.4	−5.7
Liberal and Country hold		Swing	N/A	

- Preferences were not distributed.

=== Unley ===
1941 South Australian state election: Unley
Party	Candidate	Votes	%	±%
Liberal and Country	Colin Dunnage	3,647	40.3	+5.3
Independent	John McLeay	3,030	33.5	−7.2
Independent	Ada Bromham	2,376	26.2	+26.2
Total formal votes		9,053	98.2	−0.3
Informal votes		169	1.8	+0.3
Turnout		9,222	50.0	−10.5
Two-candidate-preferred result
Liberal and Country	Colin Dunnage	5,361	59.2	+16.0
Independent	John McLeay	3,692	40.8	−16.0
Liberal and Country gain from Independent		Swing	+16.0	

=== Victoria ===
1941 South Australian state election: Victoria
Party	Candidate	Votes	%	±%
Liberal and Country	Vernon Petherick	1,741	37.0	+2.2
Labor	John Daly	1,604	34.1	+5.2
Independent	Clement Smith	1,361	28.9	−7.4
Total formal votes		4,706	98.3	+0.5
Informal votes		79	1.7	−0.5
Turnout		4,785	60.9	−9.7
Two-party-preferred result
Liberal and Country	Vernon Petherick	2,670	56.7	−1.6
Labor	John Daly	2,036	43.3	+43.3
Liberal and Country hold		Swing	N/A	

=== Wallaroo ===
1941 South Australian state election: Wallaroo
Party	Candidate	Votes	%	±%
Labor	Robert Richards	unopposed		
Labor hold		Swing		

=== Yorke Peninsula ===
1941 South Australian state election: Yorke Peninsula
Party	Candidate	Votes	%	±%
Liberal and Country	Cecil Hincks	2,286	53.9	+10.2
Independent	Daniel Davies	1,365	32.2	−24.1
Labor	Herman Dolling	593	14.0	+14.0
Total formal votes		4,244	99.1	0.0
Informal votes		39	0.9	0.0
Turnout		4,283	65.3	−8.1
Liberal and Country hold		Swing	N/A	

- Preferences were not distributed.

=== Young ===
1941 South Australian state election: Young
Party	Candidate	Votes	%	±%
Liberal and Country	Robert Nicholls	unopposed		
Liberal and Country hold		Swing		

== See also ==
- Members of the South Australian House of Assembly, 1941–1944
