= Electoral results for the district of Gawler =

South Australian district election results

This is a list of election results for the electoral district of Gawler in South Australian elections.

== Members for Gawler ==
Member	Party	Term
Leslie Duncan	Labor	1938–1952
John Clark	Labor	1952–1970

== Election results ==
=== Elections in the 1960s ===
1968 South Australian state election: Gawler
Party	Candidate	Votes	%	±%
Labor	John Clark	20,573	65.0	+0.2
Liberal and Country	Stewart Gilchrist	9,720	30.7	+5.3
Social Credit	Frank Lawrence	1,374	4.3	+4.3
Total formal votes		31,667	97.2	−0.3
Informal votes		901	2.8	+0.3
Turnout		32,568	92.7	−1.3
Two-party-preferred result
Labor	John Clark	21,260	67.1	−2.6
Liberal and Country	Stewart Gilchrist	10,407	32.9	+2.6
Labor hold		Swing	−2.6	

1965 South Australian state election: Gawler
Party	Candidate	Votes	%	±%
Labor	John Clark	16,413	64.8	−1.5
Liberal and Country	Phillip Hockey	6,441	25.4	−4.1
Independent	Desmond Clark	1,893	7.5	+7.5
Independent	John Fielder	569	2.3	+2.3
Total formal votes		25,316	97.5	−0.4
Informal votes		651	2.5	+0.4
Turnout		25,967	94.0	+1.6
Two-party-preferred result
Labor	John Clark	17,644	69.7	+2.8
Liberal and Country	Phillip Hockey	7,672	30.3	−2.8
Labor hold		Swing	+2.8	

1962 South Australian state election: Gawler
Party	Candidate	Votes	%	±%
Labor	John Clark	12,144	66.3	−1.4
Liberal and Country	Kevin Breen	5,404	29.5	−2.8
Democratic Labor	Eduard Smulders	762	4.2	+4.2
Total formal votes		18,310	97.9	+0.7
Informal votes		388	2.1	−0.7
Turnout		18,698	92.4	−1.2
Two-party-preferred result
Labor	John Clark	12,258	66.9	−0.8
Liberal and Country	Kevin Breen	6,052	33.1	+0.8
Labor hold		Swing	−0.8	

=== Elections in the 1950s ===
1959 South Australian state election: Gawler
Party	Candidate	Votes	%	±%
Labor	John Clark	8,120	67.7	−32.3
Liberal and Country	Jean Davis	3,871	32.3	+32.3
Total formal votes		11,991	97.2	
Informal votes		347	2.8	
Turnout		12,338	93.6	
Labor hold		Swing	N/A	

1956 South Australian state election: Gawler
Party	Candidate	Votes	%	±%
Labor	John Clark	unopposed		
Labor hold		Swing		

1953 South Australian state election: Gawler
Party	Candidate	Votes	%	±%
Labor	John Clark	4,432	77.1	+22.9
Independent	Frank Rieck	1,320	22.9	+22.9
Total formal votes		5,752	96.2	−2.7
Informal votes		230	3.8	+2.7
Turnout		5,982	96.1	+0.7
Labor hold		Swing	N/A	

1950 South Australian state election: Gawler
Party	Candidate	Votes	%	±%
Labor	Leslie Duncan	3,179	54.2	+0.5
Liberal and Country	Eldred Riggs	2,686	45.8	−0.5
Total formal votes		5,865	98.9	+0.5
Informal votes		64	1.1	−0.5
Turnout		5,929	95.4	+0.3
Labor hold		Swing	+0.5	

=== Elections in the 1940s ===
1947 South Australian state election: Gawler
Party	Candidate	Votes	%	±%
Labor	Leslie Duncan	3,054	53.7	−3.0
Liberal and Country	Thomas Shanahan	2,637	46.3	+3.0
Total formal votes		5,691	98.4	+0.7
Informal votes		91	1.6	−0.7
Turnout		5,782	95.1	+4.3
Labor hold		Swing	−3.0	

1944 South Australian state election: Gawler
Party	Candidate	Votes	%	±%
Labor	Leslie Duncan	2,985	56.7	+24.5
Liberal and Country	Elliott Day	2,280	43.3	+3.6
Total formal votes		5,265	97.7	−1.3
Informal votes		126	2.3	+1.3
Turnout		5,391	90.8	+21.9
Labor hold		Swing	+3.7	

1941 South Australian state election: Gawler
Party	Candidate	Votes	%	±%
Liberal and Country	Francis Waddy	1,534	39.7	+12.8
Labor	Leslie Duncan	1,243	32.2	+3.2
Independent	William Duggan	1,083	28.1	+0.4
Total formal votes		3,860	99.0	+1.7
Informal votes		39	1.0	−1.7
Turnout		3,899	68.9	−6.0
Two-party-preferred result
Labor	Leslie Duncan	2,046	53.0	−7.7
Liberal and Country	Francis Waddy	1,814	47.0	+7.7
Labor hold		Swing	−7.7	

=== Elections in the 1930s ===
1938 South Australian state election: Gawler
Party	Candidate	Votes	%	±%
Labor	Leslie Duncan	1,178	29.0	
Independent	William Duggan	1,123	27.7	
Liberal and Country	William Noack	1,090	26.9	
Independent	Adolph Ey	443	10.9	
Independent	Leslie Yelland	224	5.5	
Total formal votes		4,058	97.3	
Informal votes		111	2.7	
Turnout		4,169	74.9	
Two-party-preferred result
Labor	Leslie Duncan	2,464	60.7	
Liberal and Country	William Noack	1,594	39.3	
Labor hold		Swing		
