= Electoral results for the district of Burnside =

South Australian district election results

This is a list of election results for the electoral district of Burnside in South Australian elections.

== Members for Burnside ==
Member	Party	Term
Charles Abbott	Liberal and Country	1938–1946
Geoffrey Clarke	Liberal and Country	1946–1959
Joyce Steele	Liberal and Country	1959–1970

== Election results ==
=== Elections in the 1960s ===
1968 South Australian state election: Burnside
Party	Candidate	Votes	%	±%
Liberal and Country	Joyce Steele	20,609	59.4	−0.2
Labor	Joyce Henriott	14,059	40.6	+5.4
Total formal votes		34,668	97.2	−0.2
Informal votes		980	2.8	+0.2
Turnout		35,648	95.2	+1.0
Liberal and Country hold		Swing	−2.8	

1965 South Australian state election: Burnside
Party	Candidate	Votes	%	±%
Liberal and Country	Joyce Steele	18,394	59.6	+1.1
Labor	Joyce Henriott	10,864	35.2	+0.8
Social Credit	William Carruthers	1,624	5.3	+5.3
Total formal votes		30,882	97.4	−0.3
Informal votes		821	2.6	+0.3
Turnout		31,703	94.2	0.0
Two-party-preferred result
Liberal and Country	Joyce Steele	19,206	62.2	−2.0
Labor	Joyce Henriott	11,676	37.8	+2.0
Liberal and Country hold		Swing	−2.0	

1962 South Australian state election: Burnside
Party	Candidate	Votes	%	±%
Liberal and Country	Joyce Steele	16,103	58.5	+1.4
Labor	Henry McMaster	9,455	34.4	+34.4
Democratic Labor	Gordon Kimpton	1,670	6.1	−7.2
Independent	Frank Rieck	291	1.1	−2.7
Total formal votes		27,519	97.7	−1.1
Informal votes		655	2.3	+1.1
Turnout		28,174	94.2	+0.5
Two-party-preferred result
Liberal and Country	Joyce Steele	17,568	64.2	−5.8
Labor	Henry McMaster	9,851	35.8	+35.8
Liberal and Country hold		Swing	N/A	

=== Elections in the 1950s ===
1959 South Australian state election: Burnside
Party	Candidate	Votes	%	±%
Liberal and Country	Joyce Steele	13,228	57.1	−42.9
Independent	John Parkinson	3,236	14.0	+14.0
Democratic Labor	Kenneth Constable	3,089	13.3	+13.3
Independent	Keith Gibbs	2,756	11.9	+11.9
Independent	Frank Rieck	877	3.8	+3.8
Total formal votes		23,186	94.1	
Informal votes		1,448	5.9	
Turnout		24,634	93.7	
Liberal and Country hold		Swing	N/A	

- Preferences were not distributed.

1956 South Australian state election: Burnside
Party	Candidate	Votes	%	±%
Liberal and Country	Geoffrey Clarke	unopposed		
Liberal and Country hold		Swing		

1953 South Australian state election: Burnside
Party	Candidate	Votes	%	±%
Liberal and Country	Geoffrey Clarke	11,791	61.5	−38.5
Labor	Frederick Hansford	5,601	29.2	+29.2
Independent	John Parkinson	1,770	9.2	+9.2
Total formal votes		19,162	97.6	
Informal votes		475	2.4	
Turnout		19,637	94.5	
Two-party-preferred result
Liberal and Country	Geoffrey Clarke		66.1	−33.9
Labor	Frederick Hansford		33.9	+33.9
Liberal and Country hold		Swing	N/A	

1950 South Australian state election: Burnside
Party	Candidate	Votes	%	±%
Liberal and Country	Geoffrey Clarke	unopposed		
Liberal and Country hold		Swing		

=== Elections in the 1940s ===
1947 South Australian state election: Burnside
Party	Candidate	Votes	%	±%
Liberal and Country	Geoffrey Clarke	unopposed		
Liberal and Country hold		Swing		

1944 South Australian state election: Burnside
Party	Candidate	Votes	%	±%
Liberal and Country	Charles Abbott	9,960	64.1	−9.6
Labor	Frank White	5,568	35.9	+17.8
Total formal votes		15,528	96.4	−1.7
Informal votes		577	3.6	+1.7
Turnout		16,105	88.2	+41.4
Liberal and Country hold		Swing	N/A	

1941 South Australian state election: Burnside
Party	Candidate	Votes	%	±%
Liberal and Country	Charles Abbott	5,652	73.7	+26.6
Labor	Stanley Pyle	1,387	18.1	+3.5
Independent	Edgar Chaston	628	8.2	+8.2
Total formal votes		7,667	98.1	−0.2
Informal votes		148	1.9	+0.2
Turnout		7,815	46.8	−13.3
Liberal and Country hold		Swing	N/A	

- Preferences were not distributed.

=== Elections in the 1930s ===
1938 South Australian state election: Burnside
Party	Candidate	Votes	%	±%
Liberal and Country	Charles Abbott	4,400	47.1	
Independent	Stanley Gray	2,624	28.1	
Labor	Herbert Slater	1,366	14.6	
Independent	Jeanne Young	961	10.3	
Total formal votes		9,351	98.3	
Informal votes		162	1.7	
Turnout		9,513	60.1	
Two-party-preferred result
Liberal and Country	Charles Abbott	4,795	51.3	
Independent	Stanley Gray	4,556	48.7	
Liberal and Country hold		Swing		
