= Electoral results for the district of Prospect (South Australia) =

This is a list of election results for the electoral district of Prospect in South Australian elections.

== Members for Prospect ==
Member	Party	Term
Elder Whittle	Liberal and Country	1938–1944
Bert Shard	Labor	1944–1947
Elder Whittle	Liberal and Country	1947–1953
Jack Jennings	Labor	1953–1956

== Election results ==
=== Elections in the 1950s ===
1953 South Australian state election: Prospect
Party	Candidate	Votes	%	±%
Labor	Jack Jennings	11,728	53.4	+12.2
Liberal and Country	Elder Whittle	10,228	46.6	−8.9
Total formal votes		21,956	97.9	+2.4
Informal votes		468	2.1	−2.4
Turnout		22,424	94.9	+0.4
Labor gain from Liberal and Country		Swing	+9.2	

1950 South Australian state election: Prospect
Party	Candidate	Votes	%	±%
Liberal and Country	Elder Whittle	10,603	55.5	+1.2
Labor	James Marner	7,883	41.2	−4.5
Communist	Alan Finger	626	3.3	+3.3
Total formal votes		19,112	95.5	−2.3
Informal votes		892	4.5	+2.3
Turnout		20,004	94.5	+0.7
Two-party-preferred result
Liberal and Country	Elder Whittle		55.8	+1.5
Labor	James Marner		44.2	−1.5
Liberal and Country hold		Swing	+1.5	

- Two party preferred vote was estimated.

=== Elections in the 1940s ===
1947 South Australian state election: Prospect
Party	Candidate	Votes	%	±%
Liberal and Country	Elder Whittle	10,001	54.3	+8.4
Labor	Bert Shard	8,433	45.7	+7.4
Total formal votes		18,434	97.8	+0.3
Informal votes		412	2.2	−0.3
Turnout		18,846	93.8	+3.9
Liberal and Country gain from Labor		Swing	+6.6	

1944 South Australian state election: Prospect
Party	Candidate	Votes	%	±%
Liberal and Country	Elder Whittle	7,726	45.9	−9.2
Labor	Bert Shard	6,448	38.3	+3.7
Communist	Alan Finger	2,644	15.7	+15.7
Total formal votes		16,818	97.5	−1.2
Informal votes		433	2.5	+1.2
Turnout		17,251	89.9	+37.8
Two-party-preferred result
Labor	Bert Shard	8,793	52.3	
Liberal and Country	Elder Whittle	8,025	47.7	
Labor gain from Liberal and Country		Swing	N/A	

1941 South Australian state election: Prospect
Party	Candidate	Votes	%	±%
Liberal and Country	Elder Whittle	4,916	55.1	+8.8
Labor	Thomas Lawton	3,088	34.6	+5.2
Independent	Marcus Dodd	914	10.3	+10.3
Total formal votes		8,918	98.7	+0.1
Informal votes		120	1.3	−0.1
Turnout		9,038	52.1	−10.8
Liberal and Country hold		Swing	N/A	

- Preferences were not distributed.

=== Elections in the 1930s ===
1938 South Australian state election: Prospect
Party	Candidate	Votes	%	±%
Liberal and Country	Elder Whittle	4,758	46.3	
Labor	Joseph Connelly	3,021	29.4	
Independent	Arthur Gray	2,249	21.9	
Independent	Ruth Ravenscroft	241	2.4	
Total formal votes		10,269	98.6	
Informal votes		141	1.4	
Turnout		10,410	62.9	
Two-party-preferred result
Liberal and Country	Elder Whittle	6,262	61.0	
Labor	Joseph Connelly	4,007	39.0	
Liberal and Country hold		Swing		
