= Electoral results for the district of Burra =

South Australian district election results

This is a list of election results for the electoral district of Burra in South Australian elections.

== Members for Burra ==
First incarnation (1875–1902)
Member	Party	Term	Member	Party	Term
Ben Rounsevell		1875–1890	Rowland Rees		1875–1881
Ben Rounsevell		1875–1890	Ebenezer Ward		1881–1884
Ben Rounsevell		1875–1890	John Cockburn		1884–1887
Ben Rounsevell		1875–1890	Frederick Holder		1887–1901
George Lake		1890–1896	Frederick Holder		1887–1901
Charles Goode	National League	1896–1899	Frederick Holder		1887–1901
Ben Rounsevell	National League	1899–1902	Frederick Holder		1887–1901
Ben Rounsevell	National League	1899–1902	William Russell	Labor	1901–1902

Second incarnation (1938–1970)
Member	Party	Term
Archibald McDonald	Liberal and Country	1938–1947
George Hawker	Liberal and Country	1947–1956
Percy Quirke	Independent	1956–1963
Percy Quirke	Liberal and Country	1963–1968
Ernest Allen	Liberal and Country	1968–1970

== Election results ==
=== Elections in the 1960s ===
1968 South Australian state election: Burra
Party	Candidate	Votes	%	±%
Liberal and Country	Ernest Allen	3,131	56.9	−5.4
Labor	John Phelan	1,767	32.1	−5.6
Democratic Labor	William Ahern	602	11.0	+11.0
Total formal votes		5,500	98.7	+0.1
Informal votes		70	1.3	−0.1
Turnout		5,570	96.4	+0.5
Two-party-preferred result
Liberal and Country	Ernest Allen	3,643	66.2	+3.9
Labor	John Phelan	1,857	33.8	−3.9
Liberal and Country hold		Swing	+3.9	

1965 South Australian state election: Burra
Party	Candidate	Votes	%	±%
Liberal and Country	Percy Quirke	3,467	62.3	+18.8
Labor	John Phelan	2,101	37.7	+37.7
Total formal votes		5,568	98.6	−0.2
Informal votes		78	1.4	+0.2
Turnout		5,646	95.9	+0.2
Liberal and Country gain from Independent		Swing	N/A	

1962 South Australian state election: Burra
Party	Candidate	Votes	%	±%
Independent	Percy Quirke	3,218	56.5	+4.4
Liberal and Country	John Bailey	2,481	43.5	−4.4
Total formal votes		5,699	98.8	+0.1
Informal votes		67	1.2	−0.1
Turnout		5,766	95.7	−0.2
Independent hold		Swing	+4.4	

=== Elections in the 1950s ===
1959 South Australian state election: Burra
Party	Candidate	Votes	%	±%
Independent	Percy Quirke	3,047	52.1	+0.9
Liberal and Country	Gordon Gilfillan	2,806	47.9	−0.9
Total formal votes		5,853	98.7	−0.2
Informal votes		75	1.3	+0.2
Turnout		5,928	95.9	+0.8
Independent hold		Swing	+0.9	

1956 South Australian state election: Burra
Party	Candidate	Votes	%	±%
Independent	Percy Quirke	3,015	51.2	
Liberal and Country	George Hawker	2,876	48.8	
Total formal votes		5,891	98.9	
Informal votes		67	1.1	
Turnout		5,958	95.1	
Independent gain from Liberal and Country		Swing		

1953 South Australian state election: Burra
Party	Candidate	Votes	%	±%
Liberal and Country	George Hawker	2,478	59.4	−1.9
Labor	Even George	1,697	40.6	+1.9
Total formal votes		4,175	99.0	0.0
Informal votes		41	1.0	0.0
Turnout		4,216	97.2	+2.5
Liberal and Country hold		Swing	−1.9	

1950 South Australian state election: Burra
Party	Candidate	Votes	%	±%
Liberal and Country	George Hawker	2,633	61.3	+2.8
Labor	Even George	1,661	38.7	−2.8
Total formal votes		4,294	99.0	+0.2
Informal votes		44	1.0	−0.2
Turnout		4,338	94.7	−0.6
Liberal and Country hold		Swing	+2.8	

=== Elections in the 1940s ===
1947 South Australian state election: Burra
Party	Candidate	Votes	%	±%
Liberal and Country	George Hawker	2,566	58.5	+2.8
Labor	Michael Cronin	1,819	41.5	−2.8
Total formal votes		4,385	98.8	+1.2
Informal votes		52	1.2	−1.2
Turnout		4,437	95.3	+5.3
Liberal and Country hold		Swing	+2.8	

1944 South Australian state election: Burra
Party	Candidate	Votes	%	±%
Liberal and Country	Archibald McDonald	2,265	55.7	−2.4
Labor	Ellis Bristow	1,803	44.3	+2.4
Total formal votes		4,068	97.6	−0.7
Informal votes		99	2.4	+0.7
Turnout		4,167	90.0	+28.5
Liberal and Country hold		Swing	−2.4	

1941 South Australian state election: Burra
Party	Candidate	Votes	%	±%
Liberal and Country	Archibald McDonald	1,744	58.1	+19.0
Labor	Thomas Canny	1,260	41.9	+11.7
Total formal votes		3,004	98.3	−0.5
Informal votes		53	1.7	+0.5
Turnout		3,057	61.5	−13.8
Liberal and Country hold		Swing	−0.9	

=== Elections in the 1930s ===
1938 South Australian state election: Burra
Party	Candidate	Votes	%	±%
Liberal and Country	Archibald McDonald	1,530	39.1	
Labor	Thomas Canny	1,181	30.2	
Independent	Even George	742	19.0	
Independent	Maurice Collins	456	11.7	
Total formal votes		3,909	98.8	
Informal votes		48	1.2	
Turnout		3,957	75.3	
Two-party-preferred result
Liberal and Country	Archibald McDonald	2,305	59.0	
Labor	Thomas Canny	1,604	41.0	
Liberal and Country hold		Swing		
