= Electoral results for the district of Ridley =

South Australian district election results

This is a list of election results for the Electoral district of Ridley in South Australian elections.

== Members for Ridley ==
First incarnation (1938–1970)
Member	Party	Term
Tom Stott	Independent	1938–1970
Second incarnation (1993–1997)
Member	Party	Term
Peter Lewis	Liberal	1993–1997

== Election results ==
=== Elections in the 1990s ===
1993 South Australian state election: Ridley
Party	Candidate	Votes	%	±%
Liberal	Peter Lewis	13,955	70.9	+9.1
Labor	Gary Orr	3,960	20.1	−4.5
Democrats	Merilyn Pedrick	1,778	9.0	−0.5
Total formal votes		19,693	97.5	+0.4
Informal votes		506	2.5	−0.4
Turnout		20,199	94.8	
Two-party-preferred result
Liberal	Peter Lewis	14,789	75.1	+4.4
Labor	Gary Orr	4,904	24.9	−4.4
Liberal hold		Swing	+4.4	

=== Elections in the 1960s ===
1968 South Australian state election: Ridley
Party	Candidate	Votes	%	±%
Independent	Tom Stott	2,824	40.3	−26.6
Liberal and Country	Geoffrey Blight	2,624	37.4	+37.4
Labor	Francis Bulbeck	1,568	22.3	−10.8
Total formal votes		7,016	98.6	+0.2
Informal votes		99	1.4	−0.2
Turnout		7,115	96.6	−1.4
Two-candidate-preferred result
Independent	Tom Stott	3,901	55.6	−11.3
Liberal and Country	Geoffrey Blight	3,115	44.4	+44.4
Independent hold		Swing	N/A	

1965 South Australian state election: Ridley
Party	Candidate	Votes	%	±%
Independent	Tom Stott	4,483	66.9	+28.2
Labor	Arnold Busbridge	2,215	33.1	+8.1
Total formal votes		6,698	98.4	−0.6
Informal votes		106	1.6	+0.6
Turnout		6,804	98.0	+1.8
Independent hold		Swing	N/A	

1962 South Australian state election: Ridley
Party	Candidate	Votes	%	±%
Independent	Tom Stott	2,524	38.7	−4.0
Liberal and Country	Jack Andrew	2,366	36.3	−1.4
Labor	Darcy Nielsen	1,630	25.0	+5.4
Total formal votes		6,520	99.0	0.0
Informal votes		68	1.0	0.0
Turnout		6,588	96.2	−0.6
Two-candidate-preferred result
Independent	Tom Stott	3,734	57.3	+0.6
Liberal and Country	Jack Andrew	2,786	42.7	−0.6
Independent hold		Swing	+0.6	

=== Elections in the 1950s ===
1959 South Australian state election: Ridley
Party	Candidate	Votes	%	±%
Independent	Tom Stott	2,735	42.7	0.0
Liberal and Country	Roy Glatz	2,412	37.7	+4.5
Labor	Arnold Busbridge	1,257	19.6	−4.5
Total formal votes		9,404	99.0	0.0
Informal votes		64	1.0	0.0
Turnout		6,468	96.8	−0.2
Two-candidate-preferred result
Independent	Tom Stott	3,632	56.7	−4.3
Liberal and Country	Roy Glatz	2,772	43.3	+4.3
Independent hold		Swing	−4.3	

1956 South Australian state election: Ridley
Party	Candidate	Votes	%	±%
Independent	Tom Stott	2,638	42.7	
Liberal and Country	Cyril Tunbridge	2,054	33.2	
Labor	Arnold Busbridge	1,487	24.1	
Total formal votes		6,179	99.0	
Informal votes		65	1.0	
Turnout		6,244	96.6	
Two-candidate-preferred result
Independent	Tom Stott	3,771	61.0	
Liberal and Country	Cyril Tunbridge	2,408	39.0	
Independent hold		Swing		

1953 South Australian state election: Ridley
Party	Candidate	Votes	%	±%
Independent	Tom Stott	4,531	77.8	−22.2
Independent	Henry Schneider	1,291	22.2	+22.2
Total formal votes		5,822	98.2	
Informal votes		107	1.8	
Turnout		5,929	97.0	
Independent hold		Swing	N/A	

1950 South Australian state election: Ridley
Party	Candidate	Votes	%	±%
Independent	Tom Stott	unopposed		
Independent hold		Swing		

=== Elections in the 1940s ===
1947 South Australian state election: Ridley
Party	Candidate	Votes	%	±%
Independent	Tom Stott	3,976	75.2	+1.1
Labor	John Lloyd	1,313	24.8	−1.1
Total formal votes		5,289	97.7	−0.5
Informal votes		127	2.3	+0.5
Turnout		5,416	96.1	+6.2
Independent hold		Swing	+1.1	

1944 South Australian state election: Ridley
Party	Candidate	Votes	%	±%
Independent	Tom Stott	3,653	74.1	+12.8
Labor	Leonard Seymour	1,278	25.9	+11.8
Total formal votes		4,931	98.2	−0.4
Informal votes		92	1.8	+0.4
Turnout		5,023	89.9	+27.8
Independent hold		Swing	N/A	

1941 South Australian state election: Ridley
Party	Candidate	Votes	%	±%
Independent	Tom Stott	2,330	61.3	−4.3
Labor	John Lloyd	536	14.1	+14.1
Liberal and Country	John Strangman	510	13.4	−21.0
Liberal and Country	William Blight	428	11.3	+11.3
Total formal votes		3,804	98.6	−0.6
Informal votes		53	1.4	+0.6
Turnout		3,857	62.1	−8.6
Independent hold		Swing	N/A	

- Preferences were not distributed.

=== Elections in the 1930s ===
1938 South Australian state election: Ridley
Party	Candidate	Votes	%	±%
Independent	Tom Stott	2,985	65.6	
Liberal and Country	Francis Petch	1,565	34.4	
Total formal votes		4,550	99.2	
Informal votes		38	0.8	
Turnout		4,588	70.7	
Independent hold		Swing		
