= Charles Simeon Hare =

Australian politician

Charles Simeon Hare (1808 – 22 July 1882), commonly referred to as C. S. Hare, was a politician in colonial South Australia.

Hare was born in London, England, and arrived in South Australia in September 1836, with Sir John Morphett, to whom he acted as private secretary, and was subsequently employed by the South Australian Company in Kingscote, Kangaroo Island.

In July 1851 he was elected to the unicameral South Australian Legislative Council for West Torrens. After the results initially appearing to be a tie of 197 each for him and his opponent he was declared the winner days later by a majority of two votes. He resigned from Parliament in June of 1854.

He was a vigorous opponent of State aid to religion and of transportation of convicts to South Australia. In January 1855 he was appointed a Commissioner for effectuating the wishes of Parliament in relation to the Adelaide and Gawler Railway Bill.

On 5 March 1857 Hare was elected to the first South Australian Legislative Assembly for Yatala, but resigned on 12 May 1857, on being appointed Superintendent of the Stockade, later renamed Yatala Labour Prison. Hare became Manager of Railways in succession to Mr Drake, in July 1860, but was removed from office in May 1865, in consequence of an accident to a train carrying the Governor and Ministry, for which a Commission of Inquiry held him culpable. After an experience of several years as a planter in Fiji, Hare returned to South Australia and managed a mine near Moonta. In 1875, he was an unsuccessful candidate for the Assembly, his defeat being due to his opposition to the men's demands during the great Moonta strike, in 1874. Hare represented the district of Wallaroo from 5 April 1878 to 10 April 1881, when he resigned and revisited England, returning to South Australia in the following year. Hare died on 22 July 1882 in Adelaide, South Australia, survived by his wife; he was buried in the West Terrace Cemetery.

South Australian Legislative Council
New creation	Member for West Torrens; 1851–1854	Succeeded by Thomas Reynolds
South Australian House of Assembly
New creation	Member for Yatala; Mar 1857 – May 1857; Served alongside: John Harvey	Succeeded by Richard Bullock Andrews
Preceded by John Duncan, John Richards	Member for Wallaroo; Apr 1878 – Apr 1881; Served alongside: Luke Furner, Robert Dalrymple Ross	Succeeded by William Henry Beaglehole
