= Members of the South Australian Legislative Council, 1941–1944 =

This is a list of members of the South Australian Legislative Council from 1941 to 1944

Name	District	Party	Term expiry	Time in office
Joseph Anderson	Central No. 1	Independent	1944	1931–1944
Ernest Anthoney	Central No. 2	LCL	1947	1941–1959
Ken Bardolph	Central No. 1	Labor	1947	1941–1964
James Beerworth	Northern	Labor	1947	1939–1947
Jack Bice	Southern	LCL	1947	1941–1959
Percy Blesing	Northern	LCL	1947	1924–1949
Norman Brookman	Southern	LCL	1947	1941–1949
Ernest William Castine	Midland	LCL	1947	1933–1947
Frank Condon	Central No. 1	Labor	1944	1928–1961
Sir John Cowan	Southern	LCL	1944	1910–1944
Collier Cudmore	Central No. 2	LCL	1947	1933–1959
Sir Walter Gordon Duncan	Midland	LCL	1944	1918–1962
Sir David Gordon	Midland	LCL	1944	1913–1944
Frank Halleday ^{[1]}	Southern	Independent	1944	1938–1943
Sir Edward Holden	Central No. 2	LCL	1944	1935–1947
Lyell McEwin	Northern	LCL	1944	1934–1975
Alexander Melrose	Midland	LCL	1947	1941–1962
Oscar Oates	Central No. 1	Labor	1947	1933–1951
Sir George Ritchie	Northern	LCL	1944	1924–1944
Sir James Wallace Sandford	Central No. 2	LCL	1944	1938–1956

^{1} Independent MLC Frank Halleday resigned on 14 July 1943 to contest the 1943 federal election in the House of Representatives seat of Barker. A by-election was not held due to the proximity of the 1944 state election.
