= Luke Furner =

Australian politician (1837–1912)

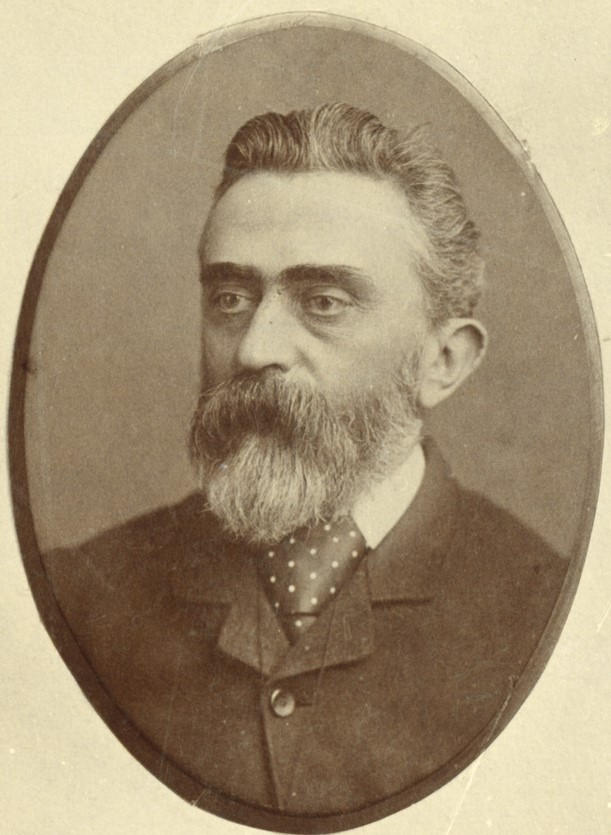

Luke Lidiard Furner (1837 – 24 June 1912) was a politician in colonial South Australia, Commissioner of Public Works 1886 to 1887.

Furner was born in Lymington, Hampshire, England, and at his Age of majority travelled to Melbourne, Australia, in the Mermaid, later moving to Adelaide, South Australia. Furner was in business in Goolwa and Moonta, South Australia, where he founded the auctioneering firm of Moody, Furner, and Co. which lasted until 1885. Furner was mayor of the Corporate Town of Moonta three times and was Worshipful Master of the local Lodge of Freemasons.

Furner was elected to the South Australian House of Assembly for Wallaroo on 5 April 1878, a seat he held until 8 April 1890. Furner was Commissioner of Public Works in the John Downer administration from 8 June 1886 to 11 June 1887. He contested the 1891 Wallaroo by-election.

Furner died in Prospect, South Australia on 24 June 1912.

Political offices
Preceded by John Spence	Commissioner of Public Works; 1886–1887	Succeeded by Alfred Catt
Parliament of South Australia
Preceded by John Duncan; John Richards	Member for Wallaroo; 1878–1890; Served alongside: R. D. Ross, C. S. Hare; W. H. Beaglehole	Succeeded by Henry Allerdale Grainger
Civic offices
Preceded by Charles Drew	Mayor of Moonta; 1873–1976	Succeeded by Samuel Rossiter
