= Members of the South Australian Legislative Council, 1944–1947 =

This is a list of members of the South Australian Legislative Council from 1944 to 1947.

Name	District	Party	Term expiry	Time in office
Ernest Anthoney	Central No. 2	LCL	1947	1941–1959
Ken Bardolph	Central No. 1	Labor	1947	1941–1964
Norman Brookman	Southern	LCL	1947	1941–1949
James Beerworth	Northern	Labor	1947	1939–1947
Jack Bice	Southern	LCL	1947	1941–1959
Percy Blesing	Northern	LCL	1947	1924–1949
Ernest William Castine	Midland	LCL	1947	1933–1947
Frank Condon	Central No. 1	Labor	1950	1928–1961
Collier Cudmore	Central No. 2	LCL	1947	1933–1959
Leslie Harold Densley	Southern	LCL	1950	1944–1967
Sir Walter Gordon Duncan	Midland	LCL	1950	1918–1962
Harry Edmonds	Northern	LCL	1950	1944–1962
Bert Hoare	Central No. 1	Labor	1950	1944–1956
Sir Edward Holden ^{[1]}	Central No. 2	LCL	1950	1935–1947
Norman Jude	Southern	LCL	1950	1944–1971
Lyell McEwin	Northern	LCL	1950	1934–1975
Alexander Melrose	Midland	LCL	1947	1941–1962
Oscar Oates	Central No. 1	Labor	1947	1933–1951
Reginald Rudall	Midland	LCL	1950	1944–1955
Sir James Wallace Sandford	Central No. 2	LCL	1950	1938–1956

^{1} LCL MLC Edward Holden, whose term did not expire until 1950, resigned on 8 January 1947, two months before the 1947 Council elections. The vacancy for the remainder of Holden's term was filled by Frank Perry on 8 March, alongside the other class, whose terms would expire in 1953.
