= John Clark (Australian politician) =

Australian politician

Member of the South Australian House of Assembly
- In office 19 April 1952 – 9 March 1973
- Preceded by: Leslie Duncan
- Succeeded by: Peter Duncan
- Constituency: Gawler (1952-1970); Elizabeth (1970-1973)

Personal details
- Born: John Clark; 14 May 1907 Adelaide, South Australia
- Died: 21 November 1984 (aged 77)
- Party: Australian Labor Party

John Stephen Clark (14 May 1907 – 21 November 1984) was an Australian politician who represented the South Australian House of Assembly seats of Gawler and Elizabeth from 1952 to 1970 and from 1970 to 1973 for the Labor Party.

Parliament of South Australia
Preceded by Leslie Duncan	Member for Gawler; 1952–1970	District abolished
New district	Member for Elizabeth; 1970–1973	Succeeded by Peter Duncan
