= Joseph Anderson (South Australian politician) =

Joseph Anderson (ca.1876 – 3 Dec 1947) was an accountant, real estate agent and politician in South Australia.

== History ==
Joseph was born in Dundee, Scotland and emigrated to South Australia at the age of 7. He attended a private school near home in Port Adelaide. At the age of 18 he travelled to the gold diggings in Coolgardie, but returned in 1895 no wealthier. Determined to better himself, he studied accountancy and law. He purchased Sidney Malin's share in the firm of the Port Adelaide real estate firm of Malin, Russell & Co., Limited.

He was a councillor at Port Adelaide for 22 years, represented the council on the Metropolitan Abattoirs board for 14 years, and served a term (1921) as mayor. He was on the board of George Chapman and Co., smallgoods makers.

He was elected as an independent at a 1931 by-election for the Central No.1 district in the South Australian Legislative Council, filling the seat left vacant by the death of Labor MLC Thomas Gluyas. He did not seek re-election at the 1944 election.

== Family ==
He married Elsie Maud; they had four sons: Jack, Bill. Allan and Ken. They lived at "Glanville Hall", Military Road, Semaphore South, later moved to Arnold Street, Underdale.
