= William Henry Beaglehole =

Australian politician (1834–1917)

William Henry Beaglehole (6 May 1834 – 2 June 1917) was an early settler in the colony of South Australia, who became a businessman and served in public office.

== Early life ==
William Henry Beaglehole was born on 6 May 1834 at Helston, Cornwall, and came to South Australia on the Prince Regent with his mother, the widow Elizabeth Beaglehole (née Tresidder) and brother John, arriving in July 1849.

== Builder and developer ==
He started work as a builder, engaged on (among other projects) the earliest section of the Children's Hospital. When gold was discovered in Victoria he joined the rush and had some success at Castlemaine. He then operated as builder and developer, in partnership with Richard Hazelgrove (1828–1907), in the copper-mining towns of Kadina, Wallaroo, and Moonta, then for eight years was landlord of Moonta's Royal Hotel.

Beaglehole became a member of Moonta town council.

== Public office ==
Beaglehole was a member for Wallaroo in the House of Assembly from April 1881 to April 1884, with (later Sir) R. D. Ross and Luke Furner as his colleagues. The district was divided, and he was elected to the new seat of Yorke Peninsula and served from April 1884 to March 1887 with colleague Robert Caldwell.

He was one of those who pushed for the purchase of Belair National Park.

== Business ==
In 1873, Beaglehole became co-owner of the Lion Hotel in North Adelaide by buying Bailey's share, joining operating partners then being Johnston, James, and Gasquoine. In 1884 he organised formation of the Lion Brewing and Malting Company and was elected chairman of directors. In 1888 Beaglehole, along with Johnston senior and his sons James and Andrew (owners of the Oakbank Brewery) floated the company, thus securing the brewing, hotel, and property rights of the company.

He was a director of Broken Hill's Junction mine from 1894 to 1899.

Beaglehole founded, with George Simpson, the Waverley Brewery at Broken Hill, New South Wales (later acquired by the South Australian Brewing Company). He started a distillery at Thebarton, which was subsequently acquired by Milne & Co. He was one of the first members of the South Australian Licensed Victuallers' Association.

He was also one of the founders of the Grand Hotel in Melbourne, with other South Australians Dr. Cawley, John Frew, Dr. Gorger, A. B. Murray, W. K. Simms, and J. B. Spence.

== Personal life ==
Beaglehole founded Moonta's first Masonic lodge.

Architect James Cumming (Note: Cumming also designed Norwood Baptist Church.) designed a two-storey Italianate villa in fashionable Brougham Place in North Adelaide for Beaglehole, which was completed in 1878.

Beaglehole devoted much of his spare time cultivating a 1,500 acres (610 ha) farm and orchard at Virginia. He was the first on the Virginia plains to extract artesian water, with eight bores on his property, and was successful in fattening up lambs for market.

He died on 2 June 1917.
