= Charles Abbott (Australian politician) =

Australian politician and judge

The Honourable Sir Charles Abbott QC
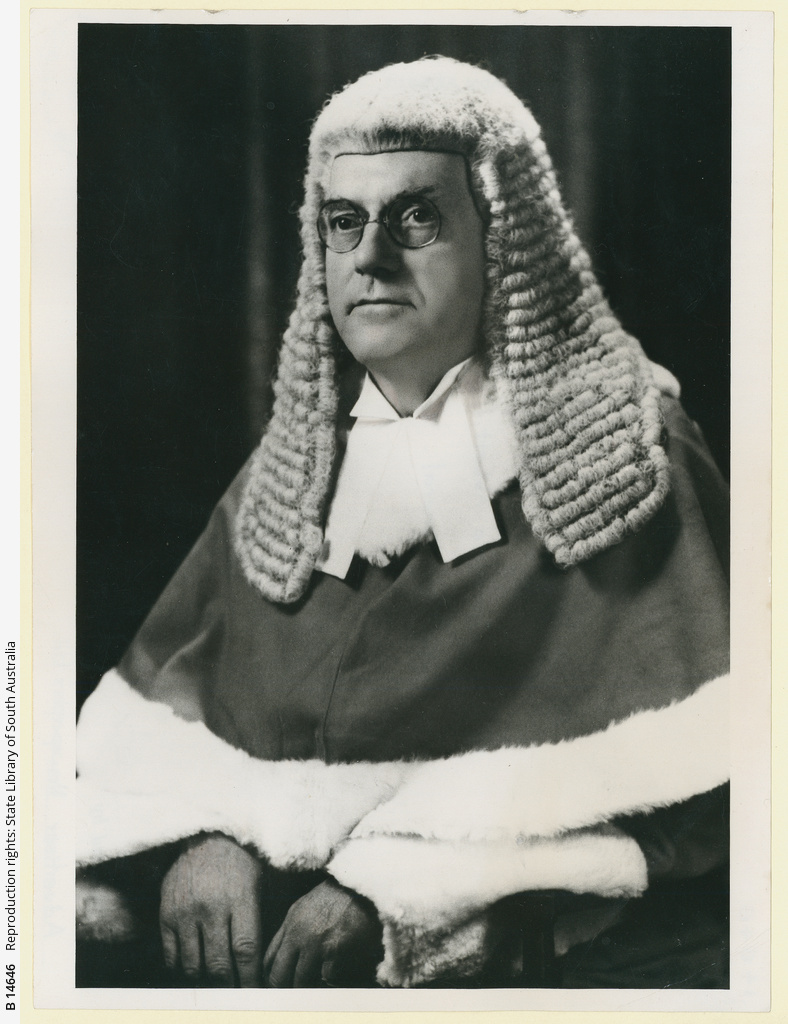

Judge of the Supreme Court of South Australia
- In office 1946–1959

Attorney-General
- In office 15 May 1944 – 17 Apr 1946
- Preceded by: Shirley Jeffries
- Succeeded by: Reginald Rudall

Minister of Education
- In office 15 May 1944 – 17 Apr 1946

Minister of Employment
- In office 15 May 1944 – 17 Apr 1946

Minister of Industry
- In office 15 May 1944 – 17 Apr 1946

Member of the South Australian Parliament for East Torrens
- In office 8 April 1933 – 18 March 1938
- Preceded by: Beasley Kearney, Arthur McArthur & Frank Nieass
- Succeeded by: District abolished

Member of the South Australian Parliament for Burnside
- In office 19 March 1939 – 2 May 1946
- Preceded by: District established
- Succeeded by: Geoffrey Clarke

Personal details
- Born: 31 October 1889 Wagga Wagga, Colony of New South Wales
- Died: 14 September 1960 (aged 70) Woodville, South Australia
- Party: Liberal and Country League
- Spouse: Lady Gladys Rose Abbott
- Profession: Lawyer, Judge & Politician
- Website: SA Parliament Biography

Sir Charles Arthur Hillas Lempriere Abbott (31 October 1889 – 14 September 1960) was an Australian lawyer, jurist and politician who represented the South Australian House of Assembly seats of East Torrens (1933–1938) and Burnside (1938–1946), and was a Judge of the Supreme Court of South Australia (1946–1959).

== Early life ==
Abbott was born 31 October 1889 at Wagga Wagga Hospital in the Colony of New South Wales to father, Doctor Charles Abbott and mother Susanna (née Beitsch). The Beitsch family came to Sydney from Schriesheim Germany per Boomerang (ship) and Yarra Yarra (ship) in 1855.

== Political and Judicial Career ==
Abbott was first elected to the South Australian Parliament in 1933 and again in 1939. In 1944, Abbott was appointed as the State's Attorney-General and Ministries of Education, Employment and Industry, and resigned his Ministries in April 1946, before his eventual resignation from the Parliament in May 1946.

Following Abbott's resignation from the South Australian Parliament in 1946, he was appointed as a judge of the Supreme Court of South Australia and continued in that role until his retirement in 1959.

== Personal life ==
Abbott married to Gladys Rose DeLaney in Adelaide, where they had three children:

- Diana Athalie Pemberton (1920–2008)
- Charles Anthony Lempriere Abbott (1922–2008)
- Derek Athol Lempriere Abbott (1926–1987)

He served as Grand Master of the Grand Lodge of Freemasons of South Australia from 1950 to 1959. and was made a Knight Bachelor in the January 1960 New Year Honours by Queen Elizabeth II.

Political offices
Preceded by Shirley Jeffries	Attorney-General of South Australia; 1944–1946	Succeeded by Reginald Rudall
South Australian House of Assembly
Preceded by Beasley Kearney; Arthur McArthur; Frank Nieass	Member for East Torrens; 1933–1938; Served alongside: Walter Hamilton, Frank Perry (politician)	Electorate abolished
New title	Member for Burnside; 1938–1946	Succeeded by Geoffrey Clarke
