= Shirley Jeffries =

Australian rules footballer (1886–1963)

The Honourable Sir Shirley Jeffries
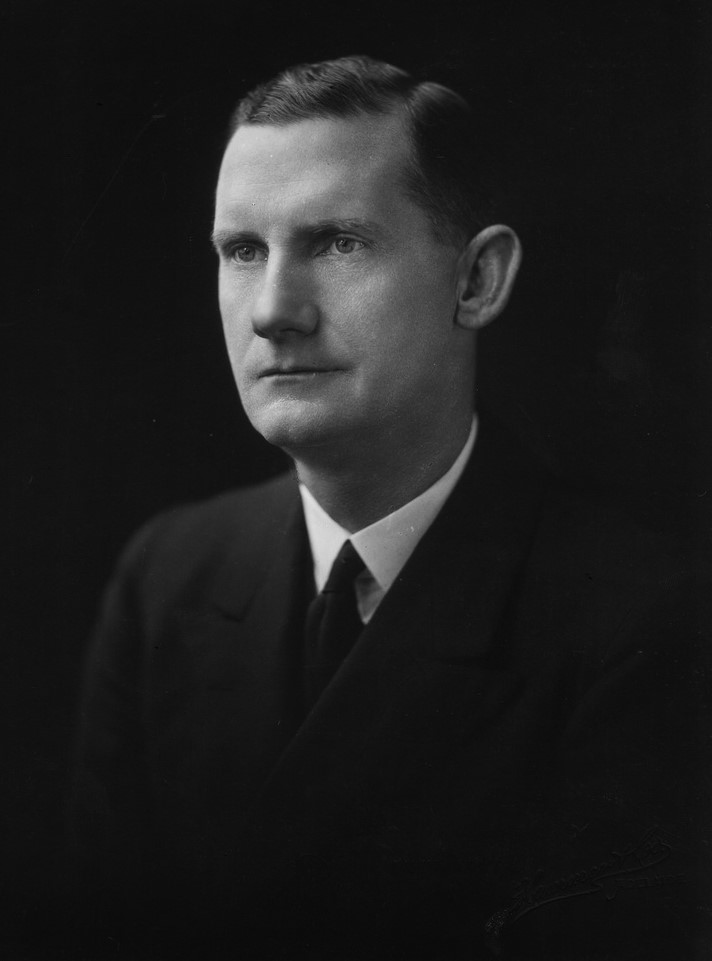
- Jeffries in 1934

34th Attorney-General of South Australia
- In office 18 April 1933 – 6 May 1944
- Monarchs: George V; Edward VIII; George VI
- Premier: Richard Layton Butler; Thomas Playford
- Governor: Alexander Hore-Ruthven; Winston Dugan; Malcolm Barclay-Harvey
- Preceded by: Bill Denny
- Succeeded by: Thomas Playford

Minister of Education
- In office 18 April 1933 – 6 May 1944
- Premier: Richard Layton Butler; Thomas Playford
- Preceded by: Frank Staniford
- Succeeded by: Thomas Playford

Minister of Industry and Employment
- In office 18 April 1933 – 6 May 1944
- Premier: Richard Layton Butler; Thomas Playford
- Preceded by: New portfolio
- Succeeded by: Thomas Playford

Member of the House of Assembly for Torrens
- In office 8 March 1947 – 7 March 1953
- Preceded by: Herbert Baldock
- Succeeded by: Leo Travers
- In office 19 March 1938 – 29 April 1944
- Preceded by: New seat
- Succeeded by: Herbert Baldock

Member of the House of Assembly for North Adelaide
- In office 8 April 1933 – 19 March 1938
- Preceded by: Frederick Birrell; Walter Warne
- Succeeded by: District abolished
- In office 26 March 1927 – 5 April 1930
- Preceded by: Stanley Whitford
- Succeeded by: Walter Warne

Personal details
- Born: 28 February 1886 Crompton, Lancashire, United Kingdom
- Died: 13 September 1963 (aged 77) Adelaide, South Australia, Australia
- Party: Liberal and Country League
- Spouses: Catherine Padman (m. 1914; died 1933); Berta Saint (m. 1935)
- Children: 3
- Profession: Politician
Australian rules football career
Playing career
Years	Club	Games (Goals)
1907	Norwood	10 (1)
1908	Sturt	9 (0)

Sir Shirley Williams Jeffries (28 February 1886 – 13 September 1963) was a member of the South Australian House of Assembly in three stints over 25 years and an Australian rules footballer in the South Australian Football League (SAFL).

== Early life ==
Born in Crompton, Lancashire to William Jeffries, a Wesleyan minister, and his wife Mercy, née Wibmer, one of three sons and three daughters. The Jeffries family emigrated to Australia in 1890 and settled in South Australia in 1898 where William Jeffries served as President of the South Australian Methodist Conference.

Jeffries attended Prince Alfred College and the University of Adelaide where he graduated with a law degree in 1906, was admitted to the Bar in 1910 and practiced as a lawyer, firstly with Fisher, Jeffries, Brebner & Taylor and later with Fisher, Powers and Jeffries.

A leading athlete in his youth, and standing at 185 cm, Jeffries played Australian rules football for Norwood in 1907, and along with future Premier of South Australia Lionel Hill was a member of the Norwood side that defeated Victorian Football League (VFL) club Carlton to become Champions of Australia. He transferred to Sturt in 1908, where he was considered part of Sturt's "best combination". He was also a leading tennis player who represented the University of Adelaide in intervarsity tennis tournaments.

== Political career ==
Jeffries was elected to the City of Mitcham Council and became involved in conservative politics in South Australia, serving as the President of the North Adelaide Men's Branch of the conservative Liberal Union. He gained pre-selection with the Liberal Federation (the successor of the Liberal Union) for the South Australian House of Assembly electorate of North Adelaide at the 1924 election. He was unsuccessful but again won Liberal Federation pre-selection for North Adelaide for the 1927 election, and won the seat for the party for the first time in seventeen years. Jeffries lost his seat at the 1930 election in the wake of the Great Depression but regained it at the subsequent 1933 election.

Following the 1933 election, Jeffries was appointed Minister of Industry and Employment in the Butler Government, and later gained the Attorney-General and Education portfolios. His refusal to increase the ration allowance for children earned him the opposition of unions and public organisations.

In 1938, Premier Richard Layton Butler resigned from parliament to stand as a candidate at the by-election for the federal Division of Wakefield. Media speculation had Jeffries and Thomas Playford IV as the most likely replacements for Butler, with Jeffries considered a better candidate than Playford due to his greater experience in parliament, including stints as acting Premier in Butler's absence. Jeffries indicated that he would stand for the position of leader of the Liberal and Country League (LCL) (and therefore the premiership of South Australia) but when the leadership was held, Playford was unanimously elected. It was thought that Jeffries was overlooked for the Premiership because he was "prone to commit himself too inextricably on public questions, and that as he has made his position clear—too clear for the liking of many—on social issues prominently before the public at present, to make him Premier would be injudicious." Instead, Jeffries kept his portfolios of Attorney-General, Education, and Industry and Employment in the new Playford Ministry.

Following an electoral redistribution, Jeffries switched to the Electoral district of Torrens in 1938, where he served until his defeat at the 1944 election. He regained his seat in 1947 and retired in 1953.

== Community activities ==
A lifelong Methodist, Jeffries was called "the most influential Methodist layman of his generation in South Australia", and served on many Church bodies, including the General Conference of the Methodist Church from 1917 to 1960, superintendent of the Blackwood Sunday School and the Mount Barker Rest Home. As a lay preacher, his preaching was described as "reasonable, urgent, fair, and sympathetic". and he was well known for his opposition to alcohol, with one writer commenting "How the beer-sellers hate S. W. Jeffries!!"

Throughout his life Jeffries was heavily involved in community and philanthropic activities. In 1939 he became the inaugural chairman of the National Fitness Council of South Australia. Jeffries was instrumental in the establishment of Lincoln College at the University of Adelaide in 1952 and Westminster School in 1961 and for various periods served as a trustee of the Savings Bank of South Australia, Treasurer of the Memorial Hospital in Adelaide, a member of the South Australian branch of the Young Men's Christian Association (YMCA) board and as president of the Commonwealth Club, the Adelaide Competitive Choir and the Patriotic Society.

Jeffries was awarded a knighthood on 1 June 1953 for his services to public service in South Australia and the chapel at Westminster School, Adelaide is named for him.

== Personal life ==
Jeffries' brother, Lewis Jeffries, was a leading medical practitioner who served as inspector-general of hospitals in South Australia, and his sister, Elsie, was decorated for her work as an army nurse during WWI.

Jeffries married Catherine Emma Padman at the Methodist Church, Kent Town, on 15 April 1914. They had one child, a son, who died in childhood.

Following Catherine's death in February 1933, the 49 year old Jeffries married 25 year old Berta Marion Saint on 21 May 1935 at the Methodist Church, Rosefield. The wedding caused discussion in Adelaide as it was conducted in secret and none of Jeffries' political colleagues were invited. Berta was described as "attractive, tall, and slim, and has very dark hair, contrasting with her fair skin. She is an old scholar of M.L.C., and since her schooldays has been a voluntary helper at the Children's Hospital. She is an excellent needlewoman." Berta gave birth to a daughter, Elizabeth, on 18 December 1936 and a boy, Richard, on 21 July 1941.

Jeffries was hospitalised in August 1953 due to an arm injury following a fall at his home.

Jeffries died suddenly at his home in Leabrook, South Australia on 15 September 1963.

== Sources ==
- Cockburn, S. (1991) Playford: Benevolent Despot. Axiom Publishing: Adelaide. ISBN 0-9594164-4-7.

Political offices
Preceded by Bill Denny	Attorney-General of South Australia; 1933-1944	Succeeded by Charles Abbott
South Australian House of Assembly
Preceded by Stanley Whitford	Member for North Adelaide; 1927–1930; Served alongside: Frederick Birrell	Succeeded by Walter Warne
Preceded by Walter Warne	Member for North Adelaide; 1933–1938; Served alongside: Victor Marra Newland	Electorate abolished
Preceded by New Electorate	Member for Torrens; 1938–1944	Succeeded by Herbert Baldock
Preceded by Herbert Baldock	Member for Torrens; 1947–1953	Succeeded by John Travers
