= Oscar Oates =

Australian politician

Edgar Alfred "Oscar" Oates (1 November 1889 – 2 September 1951 (Note: His parliamentary biography gives his date of birth as 1 November 1889, which would make his age at death as 61, while his death notice gives his age as 63, which would make his year of birth as 1887 or 1888.)) was an Australian politician. He was a Labor member of the South Australian Legislative Council from 1933 until his death.

He was born at Kangaroo Flat, 5 km north of Gawler, and was educated at the Gawler school, before working as a wharf labourer at Port Adelaide. He was a member of the Waterside Workers Federation from 1916 to the day he died, and served as president of its Port Adelaide branch and on its state executive.

He was a fierce union rival of future independent MP Thomas Thompson, ousting Thompson as branch president and expelling him from the union. He was also president of the SA Public Schools Committees' Association and president of the state executive of the Working Men's Association.

He was elected for Labor in 1933 to the Legislative Council for the Central No. 1 district, with a substantial support from preferences.

During his term of office he made three attempts to introduce a State lottery, and was about to make a fourth on the week he died. He also made considerable attempts to have a new hospital built in the Port Adelaide area. He was a member of the Parliamentary Land Settlement Committee, and Libraries and Printing Committees.

He died suddenly at his Rosewater home in 1951 while still in office; he had been scheduled to be the main speaker at a Labor rally later that day. He was buried at Cheltenham Cemetery, and the Waterside Workers' Federation donated a new pulpit for Dale Street Central Mission Church in his honour.

He was married to Ada Grace; they had a son, Alfred J. G. Oates of Rosewater and a daughter Joan, Mrs. A McDonald of Rosewater Gardens. They lived at 38 Junction road. Rosewater.
