= John Richards (Australian politician) =

Australian politician

John Richards (c. 1842 – 24 January 1913) was a politician in the colony of South Australia.

He was born in Helston, Cornwall and emigrated to South Australia, arriving on the Duke of Bedford in December 1848.

He acquired a considerably knowledge of mining, particularly copper mining, and wrote on the subject for The Register, the London Mining Journal and other publications, and ran a successful business in the mining districts of Yorke's Peninsula. He also wrote eloquently and forcefully in defence of Graham Berry.

He represented Wallaroo in the South Australian House of Assembly from February 1875 to April 1878.

He took to drink, and was reported to be homeless in December 1881 when he was convicted cheque fraud and sentenced to imprisonment for one month. He was charged a second time in 1882, however he was acquitted as the bank books were not produced at his trial. He was convicted a second time in June 1882 and sentenced to imprisonment for 3 months.

He died at the Destitute Asylum, where he had been incarcerated since 1909.

== Family ==
He married the eldest daughter of George Thomas Crutchett (c. 1825–1893), Moonta's first Town Clerk, and Susan Nichols Crutchett, née Withall (1820–1927). Their children included:

- Herbert Stanley Richards married Katherine May "Tot" ( –6 July 1931), lived at 3 King Edward Avenue, Lower Mitcham
