= Robert Dalrymple Ross =

Australian army officer, politician and businessman (1827–1887)

Sir Robert Dalrymple Ross
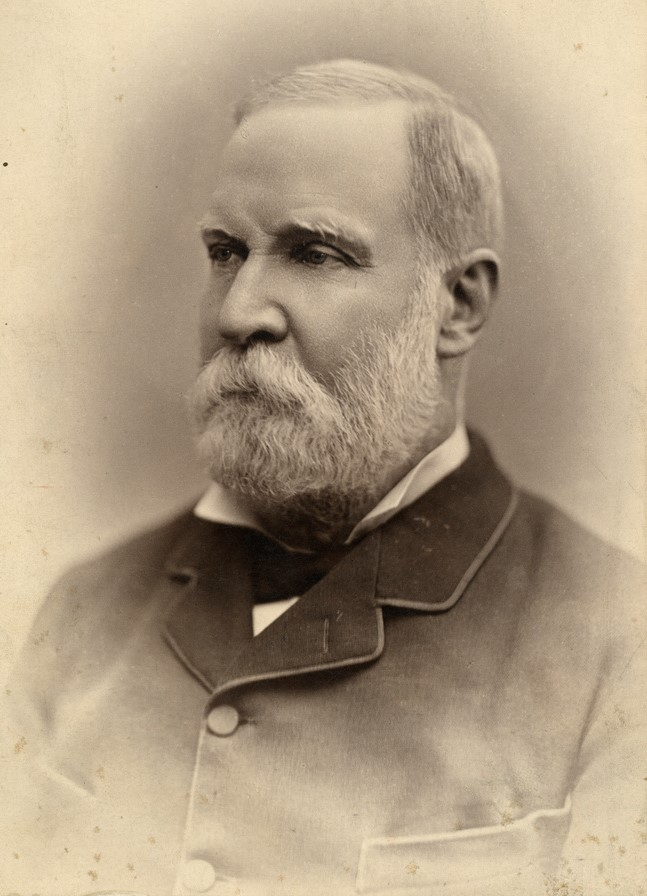

4th Speaker of the South Australian House of Assembly
- In office 4 January 1881 – 27 December 1887
- Preceded by: George Kingston
- Succeeded by: John Bray

Treasurer of South Australia
- In office 6 June 1876 – 26 October 1877
- Preceded by: Arthur Blyth
- Succeeded by: James Penn Boucaut

Member of the South Australian House of Assembly for Wallaroo
- In office 4 June 1875 – 19 March 1884

Member of the South Australian House of Assembly for Gumeracha
- In office 8 April 1884 – 27 December 1887

Personal details
- Born: St Vincent, West Indies
- Died: 27 December 1887 Adelaide, South Australia
- Parent: John Pemberton Ross (father)
- Occupation: Politician, businessman

Sir Robert Dalrymple Ross (1827–1887) was an army officer, politician and businessman.

He was born at St Vincent in the West Indies, son of John Pemberton Ross, Speaker of the House of Assembly at St Vincent, and his wife, the only daughter of Dr Alexander Anderson. His father was a slave-owner and received compensation for the emancipation of slaves on Nevis. He was educated in England, joined the British Army in 1855, and commissioned in 1856.

Ross was appointed to South Australia in 1862 as head of the Commissariat Department and was briefly aide-de-camp to Governor Daly. On 10 August 1865 in Adelaide he married Mary Anstice (d.1867), daughter of John Baker, and bought Highercombe at Gumeracha. In 1869 he went to England, and in 1870 to Ireland, but a little later he resigned his commission to return to Australia.

In 1875 after being defeated for Gumeracha, Ross entered the House of Assembly for Wallaroo and from June 1876 to October 1877 was Treasurer of South Australia in the Colton ministry. In 1881-87 he was Speaker of the South Australian House of Assembly. He represented Gumeracha in 1884-87 and was knighted in 1886.

Summary of activities and appointments

- Actively supported scheme to lay a cable from England to Australia.
- Actively supported scheme to build a transcontinental railway from Adelaide to Darwin.
- In 1879 told a commission on liquor laws that wine would become a most important industry of the colony.
- Carried out experiments at Highercombe in growing olives and vines, in cider making and in fruit drying.
- President of the Royal Agricultural and Horticultural Society of South Australia; he gave papers on agriculture, scrub land cultivation and wine and brandy.
- Governor of the Collegiate School of St Peter, Adelaide.
- Member of the Council of the University of Adelaide.
- Chairman of the Adelaide Steamship Company.
- Member of the Royal Agricultural and Horticultural Society and its president from 1880 to 1885.
- Promoter and guarantor of the 1887 Adelaide Jubilee International Exhibition.

Ross died in hospital at North Adelaide on 27 December 1887 (aged 59–60) and was buried, after a state funeral, in St George's cemetery, Woodforde.
