= Archibald McDonald (Australian politician) =

Australian politician

Archibald Donald McDonald (22 December 1872 – 30 November 1962) was an Australian politician who represented the South Australian House of Assembly seats of Burra Burra from 1933 to 1938 and Burra from 1938 to 1947 for the Liberal and Country League.
