= Herbert Baldock =

Australian politician

Herbert Leslie Baldock (9 May 1887 – 24 December 1956) was an Australian politician who represented the South Australian House of Assembly seat of Torrens from 1944 to 1947 for the Labor Party.
