= Geoffrey Clarke (politician) =

Australian politician

Geoffrey Thomas Clarke (22 September 1903 – 17 October 1976) was an Australian politician.

In 1937 he was elected honorary secretary of the Literary Societies' Union of South Australia.

He represented the South Australian House of Assembly seat of Burnside from 1946 to 1959 for the Liberal and Country League.
