= Leslie Heath =

Australian politician

Leslie Roach (Larry) Heath (17 April 1902 – 16 July 1957) was an Australian politician and admired Horse Racing Administrator. He represented the South Australian House of Assembly seat of Wallaroo from 1956 to 1957 for the Liberal and Country League.

Heath was born at Wallaroo, and moved to Kadina in 1910. Heath worked as a solicitor's clerk, then worked for the Kadina office of the South Australian Farmers' Union, eventually becoming manager. He later formed his own agency business and went into partnership with another businessman as Heath and Ferguson.

He was a Corporate Town of Kadina councillor for 16 years, secretary of the Yorke Peninsula Trotting Club for 28 years, secretary of the Wallaroo Hospital Board for 10 years, secretary of the Kadina and Wallaroo Jockey Club and president of the South Australian Trotting League during the sports halcyon days from 1952 to 1957. The trotting track at the Kadina Showgrounds was named the L. R. Heath Raceway in his honour. Harness Racing participants would also race for the annual Heath Cup

Heath owned winning horses that were trained and driven by renowned horseman Malcolm Allan (see Brooklyn Park). Mr. Heaths personal racing colours were orange with a copper hoop and a copper cap to reflect the copper coast, which he represented in the South Australian Parliament.

He married Marjorie Alford Sharples in 1925. They had no children.

Heath died in a motor vehicle accident on Port Wakefield Road, Inkerman late at night in July 1957 when he collided with a stationary semitrailer whilst driving home to Kadina after an evening Trotting League meeting, which followed a day in parliament in Adelaide.

Heath's nephew John Olsen would later also join the Liberal Party and go on to become Premier of South Australia.

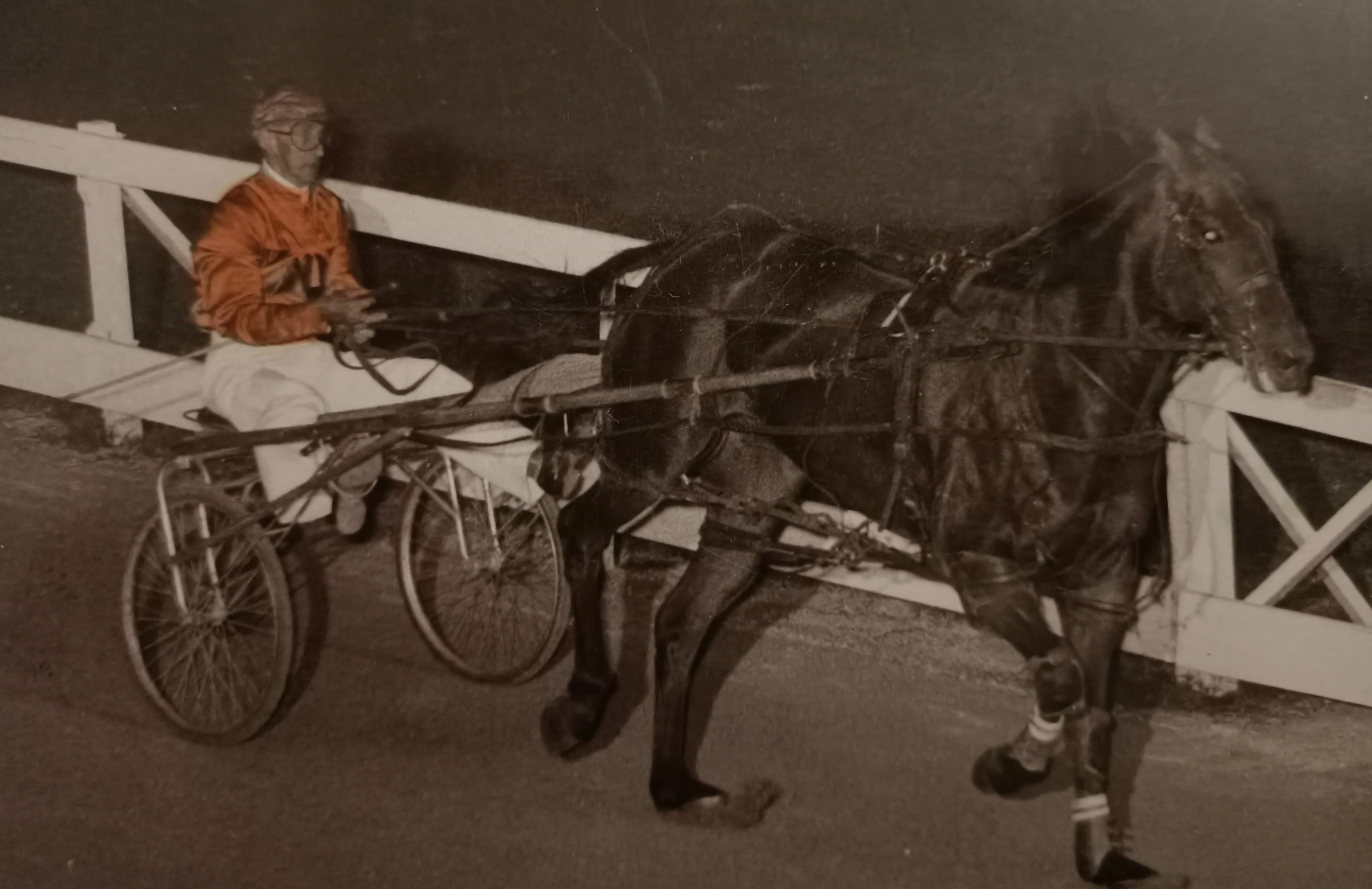
"Nalander" owned by "Larry" Heath and driven by Malcolm Allan (in Mr. Heaths racing colours) winning on 13-4-1957 at Wayville, South Australia.
