= 1941 South Australian state election =

← 1938	29 March 1941	1944 →

All 39 seats in the South Australian House of Assembly 20 seats were needed for a majority
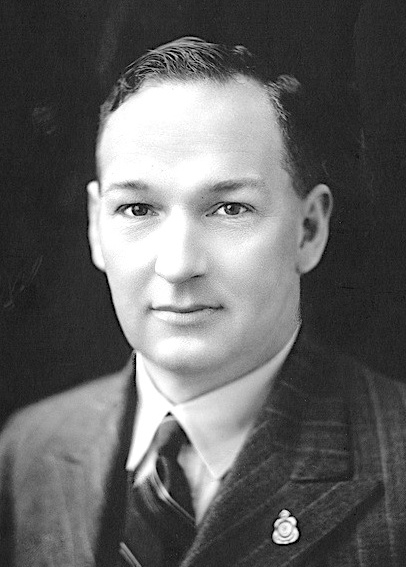

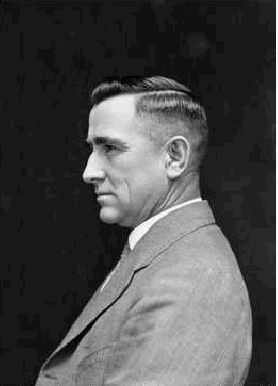
	First party	Second party
Leader	Thomas Playford	Robert Richards
Party	Liberal and Country League	Labor
Leader since	5 November 1938	1 April 1938
Leader's seat	Gumeracha	Wallaroo
Last election	15 seats	9 seats
Seats won	20 seats	11 seats
Seat change	▲5	▲2
Percentage	37.55%	33.25%
Swing	▲4.12	▲7.08
Premier before election
Thomas Playford
Liberal and Country League
Elected Premier
Thomas Playford
Liberal and Country League

State elections were held in South Australia on 29 March 1941. All 39 seats in the South Australian House of Assembly were up for election. The incumbent Liberal and Country League government led by Premier of South Australia Thomas Playford IV defeated the opposition Australian Labor Party led by Leader of the Opposition Robert Richards.

== Background ==
Though the LCL was in minority government with 15 of 39 seats following the 1938 election, where 14 of 39 lower house MPs were elected as independents which as a grouping won more than either major party with 40 percent of the primary vote, the Playford LCL won a one-seat majority government following the 1941 election.

Turnout crashed to a record-low 50 percent, triggering the government to institute compulsory voting from the 1944 election.

== Results ==
Arrangement of the House of Assembly after the 1941 state election.

South Australian state election, 29 March 1941 House of Assembly << 1938–1944 >>
Enrolled voters	339,263				
Votes cast	171,978		Turnout	50.69%	-12.62%
Informal votes	3,365		Informal	1.96%	-0.20%
Summary of votes by party
Party	Primary votes	%	Swing	Seats	Change
Liberal and Country	63,317	37.55%	+4.12%	20	+ 5
Labor	56,062	33.25%	+7.08%	11	+ 2
Independent	41,487	24.60%	–9.48%	5	– 7
Independent Labor	5,090	3.02%	–2.63%	2	± 0
Independent Liberal	2,657	1.58%	*	1	+ 1
Total	168,613			39	

== See also ==
- Results of the South Australian state election, 1941 (House of Assembly)
- Members of the South Australian House of Assembly, 1941-1944
- Members of the South Australian Legislative Council, 1941–1944
- Playmander
