= Elder Whittle =

Australian politician

Elder George Whittle (8 January 1886 – 31 May 1965) was an Australian politician who represented the South Australian House of Assembly seat of Prospect from 1938 to 1944 and 1947 to 1953 for the Liberal and Country League.
