= Leslie Duncan =

Australian politician (1880–1952)

Member of the South Australian Parliament for Gawler
- In office 19 March 1938 – 27 February 1952
- Preceded by: New district
- Succeeded by: John Clark

Personal details
- Born: 20 August 1880; Natimuk, Victoria
- Died: 27 February 1952 (aged 71); Gawler, South Australia
- Resting place: Willaston General Cemetery
- Political party: Australian Labor Party
- Spouse: Mabel E. Jory (m. 1905)
- Occupation: Newspaper proprietor

Leslie Samuel Duncan (20 August 1880 – 27 February 1952) was a newspaper editor and politician in the State of South Australia.

== History ==
Duncan was born in Natimuk, Victoria, a son of Andrew and Isabella Duncan. He married Mabel Jory, of the same town, in 1905.

He and brother-in-law Harry Jory started in the newspaper business in Edenhope, Victoria, where they owned the Edenhope Chronicle, which folded in 1908, then they established The Border Chronicle at Bordertown and Lawloit Times at Kaniva, Victoria, later owned by W. D. Curry. He disposed of the Border Chronicle to Ben L. Wilkinson and took over the Barossa News, Tanunda in 1915, which he left in 1917 to take the position of managing editor of The Bunyip, with which he had almost 30 years' association, during which time he revolutionised and expanded the paper's mechanical operations. He controlled The Bunyip through the Great Depression and the shortages and manpower difficulties of the War years. In 1946 he left the Bunyip but retained an interest in its welfare.

For 15 years he was Secretary of the Gawler Agricultural, Horticultural & Floricultural Society named for the town of Gawler. Duncan was a keen bowls player and was elected Club President for the 1949–1950 season. He was for many years until his death a member of the High School council, and the progress of the school was largely due to his efforts.

He was elected to the House of Assembly seat of the Electoral district of Gawler for the Labor Party and held the seat from March 1938 until his death on 27 February 1952. He served as secretary of the parliamentary Labor Party until he was forced in 1951 to step down due to ill health. He was a member of the Subordinate Committee on Legislation and the Parliamentary Land Settlement Committee.

He died at Hutchison Hospital, Gawler. The burial took place at Willaston General Cemetery, where the pallbearers were the Premier (Thomas Playford IV), the Leader of the Opposition (Mick O'Halloran), the Attorney General (Reginald Rudall), C. R. Hawke, J. F. Power, and K. L. Barnet.

== Family ==
He married Mabel E. Jory of Natimuk on 27 December 1905. Among their children were sons Leslie, Alan and Douglas, and daughters Rosina Isabelle (c. 1912 – 14 August 1937) and Joan.

Parliament of South Australia
New district	Member for Gawler; 1938–1952	Succeeded by John Clark
