= Electoral district of Gawler =

Former South Australian state electoral district

Coordinates: 34°35′53″S 138°44′42″E

Gawler South Australia—House of Assembly
- State: South Australia
- Created: 1938
- Abolished: 1970
- Namesake: Gawler, South Australia
- Demographic: Rural

Gawler was an electoral district of the House of Assembly in the Australian state of South Australia from 1938 to 1970.

The polling places in the Electorate of Gawler for the 1938 were Cockatoo Valley, Gawler, Gawler Blocks, Gawler South, Loos, Lyndoch, One Tree Hill, Rosedale, Roseworthy, Rowland's Flat, Smithfield, Wasleys, Willaston and Williamstown.

Gawler was abolished in a boundary redistribution in 1970, John Clark represented the newly created district of Electoral district of Elizabeth from 1970.

The town of Gawler is currently represented by the seat of Light.

== Members ==
Member	Party	Term
Leslie Duncan	Labor	1938–1952
John Clark	Labor	1952–1970
