= 1947 South Australian state election =

← 1944	8 March 1947	1950 →

All 39 seats in the South Australian House of Assembly 20 seats were needed for a majority
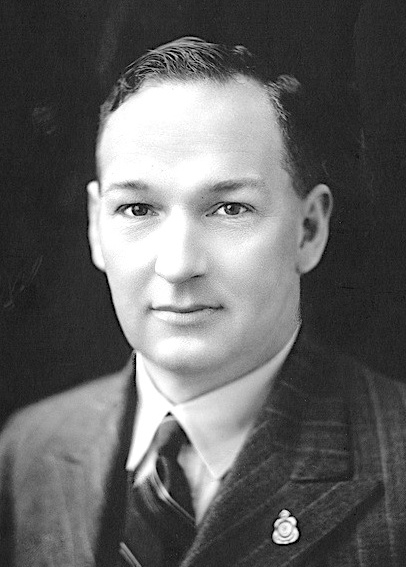

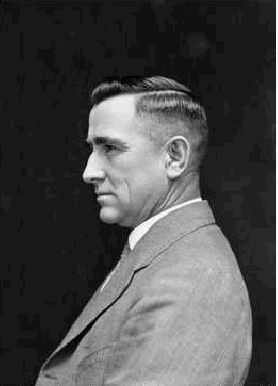
	First party	Second party
Leader	Thomas Playford	Robert Richards
Party	Liberal and Country League	Labor
Leader since	5 November 1938	1 April 1938
Leader's seat	Gumeracha	Wallaroo
Last election	20 seats	16 seats
Seats won	23 seats	13 seats
Seat change	▲3	▼3
Percentage	52.0%	48.0%
Swing	▲5.3	▼5.3
Premier before election
Thomas Playford
Liberal and Country League
Elected Premier
Thomas Playford
Liberal and Country League

State elections were held in South Australia on 8 March 1947. All 39 seats in the South Australian House of Assembly were up for election. The incumbent Liberal and Country League government led by Premier of South Australia Thomas Playford IV defeated the opposition Australian Labor Party led by Leader of the Opposition Robert Richards.

== Background ==
The LCL won three seats—metropolitan Norwood, Prospect and Torrens—from Labor. The LCL won back rural Victoria after losing it to Labor at a by-election in 1945.

== Results ==
Arrangement of the House of Assembly after the 1947 state election.

South Australian state election, 8 March 1947 House of Assembly << 1944–1950 >>
Enrolled voters	306,059				
Votes cast	285,765		Turnout	93.37%	+4.84%
Informal votes	10,366		Informal	3.63%	+0.41%
Summary of votes by party
Party	Primary votes	%	Swing	Seats	Change
Labor	133,959	48.64%	+6.12%	13	– 3
Liberal and Country	111,216	40.38%	–5.46%	23	+ 3
Communist	8,178	2.97%	+0.90%	0	± 0
Independent	17,083	6.20%	–0.43%	3	± 0
Independent Labor	4,963	1.80%	–0.45%	0	± 0
Total	275,399			39	
Two-party-preferred
Liberal and Country		52.00%	+5.30%		
Labor		48.00%	–5.30%		

- The primary vote figures were from contested seats, while the state-wide two-party-preferred vote figures were estimated from all seats.

== See also ==
- Results of the South Australian state election, 1947 (House of Assembly)
- Candidates of the 1947 South Australian state election
- Members of the South Australian House of Assembly, 1947-1950
- Members of the South Australian Legislative Council, 1947-1950
- Playmander
