= 1944 South Australian state election =

← 1941	29 April 1944	1947 →

All 39 seats in the South Australian House of Assembly 20 seats were needed for a majority
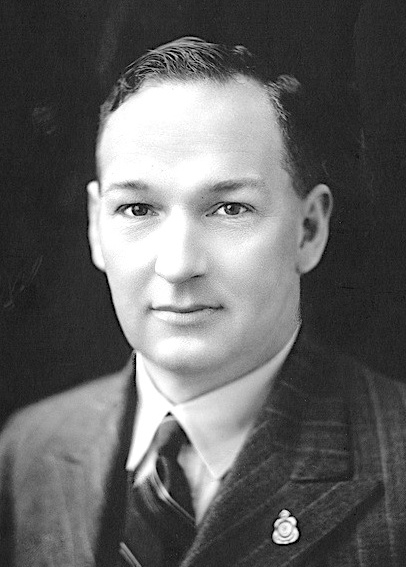

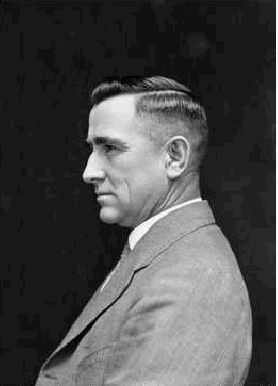
	First party	Second party
Leader	Thomas Playford	Robert Richards
Party	Liberal and Country League	Labor
Leader since	5 November 1938	1 April 1938
Leader's seat	Gumeracha	Wallaroo
Last election	20 seats	11 seats
Seats won	20 seats	16 seats
Seat change	0	▲5
Percentage	46.7%	53.3%
Premier before election
Thomas Playford
Liberal and Country League
Elected Premier
Thomas Playford
Liberal and Country League

State elections were held in South Australia on 29 April 1944. All 39 seats in the South Australian House of Assembly were up for election. The incumbent Liberal and Country League government led by Premier of South Australia Thomas Playford IV defeated the opposition Australian Labor Party led by Leader of the Opposition Robert Richards.

== Background ==
Labor won an additional five seats totaling 16 seats − the highest number of seats won by Labor from the 1933 election through to the 1959 election, an effort not even outdone at the 1953 election where Labor won 53 percent of the statewide two-party vote but the LCL retained government.

The election was the first where the two-party vote had been retrospectively calculated. Unusually a wartime opposition won a clear majority of the two-party vote.

Turnout crashed to 50 percent at the 1941 election, triggering the government to institute compulsory voting from this election.

The Communist Party of Australia in South Australia recorded their highest vote at this election − 19.4 percent (2,500 votes) for candidate Alf Watt in the seat of Adelaide. The party contested one other seat at the election, Prospect, on 15.7 percent. The party only contested a select few seats at each election, the first at the 1930 election and the last at the 1977 election.

== Results ==
Arrangement of the House of Assembly after the 1944 state election.

South Australian state election, 29 April 1944 House of Assembly << 1941–1947 >>
Enrolled voters	289,032				
Votes cast	255,883		Turnout	88.53%	+37.84%
Informal votes	8,229		Informal	3.22%	+1.26%
Summary of votes by party
Party	Primary votes	%	Swing	Seats	Change
Liberal and Country	113,536	45.84%	+8.29%	20	± 0
Labor	105,298	42.52%	+9.27%	16	+ 5
Communist	5,136	2.07%	*	0	± 0
Independent	16,439	6.64%	–17.97%	3	– 2
Independent Labor	5,587	2.26%	–0.76%	0	– 2
Independent Liberal	1,658	0.67%	–0.91%	0	– 1
Total	247,654			39	
Two-party-preferred
Liberal and Country		46.70%	*		
Labor		53.30%	*		

- The primary vote figures were from contested seats, while the state-wide two-party-preferred vote figures were estimated from all seats.

== See also ==
- Results of the South Australian state election, 1944 (House of Assembly)
- Candidates of the 1944 South Australian state election
- Members of the South Australian House of Assembly, 1944-1947
- Members of the South Australian Legislative Council, 1944–1947
- Playmander
