= Electoral district of Wallaroo =

Former South Australian state electoral district

Wallaroo South Australia—House of Assembly
- State: South Australia
- Created: 1875
- Abolished: 1970
- Namesake: Wallaroo, South Australia
- Demographic: Rural
- Coordinates: 33°55′S 137°37′E

Wallaroo is a defunct electoral district that elected members to the House of Assembly, the lower house of the bicameral legislature of the Australian state of South Australia. It was established in 1875 and abolished in 1970.

Successful 1891 Wallaroo by-election candidate Richard Hooper was the first Labor member of the House of Assembly, but was not a member of the newly formed United Labor Party (ULP), instead serving as an independent Labor member. The 1892 East Adelaide by-election saw ULP candidate John McPherson win the seat. It was the first time the ULP had won a seat in the House of Assembly, with electoral success to be followed at the 1893 colonial election, winning 10 of 54 seats and the balance of power, allowing the ULP to support the liberal opposition led by Charles Kingston in defeating the conservative government led by John Downer.

The town of Wallaroo is currently located in the seat of Narungga.

== Members ==
Three members (1875–1884)
Member	Party	Term	Member	Party	Term	Member	Party	Term
John Duncan		1875–1878	John Richards		1875–1878	M. H. Madge		1875–1875
John Duncan		1875–1878	John Richards		1875–1878	R. D. Ross		1875–1884
C. S. Hare		1878–1881	Luke Furner		1878–1884	R. D. Ross		1875–1884
W. H. Beaglehole		1881–1884	Luke Furner		1878–1884	R. D. Ross		1875–1884

Two members (1884–1902)
Member	Party	Term	Member	Party	Term
H. A. Grainger		1884–1885	Luke Furner		1884–1890
David Bews		1885–1891	Luke Furner		1884–1890
David Bews		1885–1891	H. A. Grainger		1890–1901
Richard Hooper	Labor	1891–1902	H. A. Grainger		1890–1901
Richard Hooper	Labor	1891–1902	John Verran	Labor	1901–1902

Three members (1902–1915)
Member	Party	Term	Member	Party	Term	Member	Party	Term
Peter Allen		1902–1912	John Verran	Labor	1902–1915	John Shannon		1902–1905
Peter Allen		1902–1912	John Verran	Labor	1902–1915	A. E. Winter	Labor	1905–1912
J. F. Herbert	Labor	1912–1915	John Verran	Labor	1902–1915	J. A. Southwood	Labor	1912–1915

Two members (1915–1938)
Member	Party	Term	Member	Party	Term
J. F. Herbert	Labor	1915–1917	John Verran	Labor	1915–1917
J. F. Herbert	National	1917–1918	John Verran	National	1917–1918
Robert Richards	Labor	1918–1931	John Pedler	Labor	1918–1931
Robert Richards	Parliamentary Labor	1931–1934	John Pedler	Parliamentary Labor	1931–1934
Robert Richards	Labor	1934–1938	John Pedler	Labor	1934–1938

Single-member (1938–1970)
Member	Party	Term
Robert Richards	Labor	1938–1950
Hughie McAlees	Labor	1950–1956
Leslie Heath	Liberal and Country	1956–1957
Lloyd Hughes	Labor	1957–1970
