= Results of the 1938 South Australian state election (House of Assembly) =

South Australian state election, 19 March 1938 House of Assembly << 1933–1941 >>
Enrolled voters	364,884				
Votes cast	233,136		Turnout	63.31%	+3.86%
Informal votes	14,811		Informal	2.16%	-2.71%
Summary of votes by party
Party	Primary votes	%	Swing	Seats	Change
Liberal and Country	63,317	33.14%	–1.18%	15	– 14
Labor	57,124	26.16%	–1.61%	9	+ 3
Single Tax League	1,451	0.66%	–2.46%	0	± 0
Independent	74,412	34.08%	+20.67%	12	+ 9
Independent Labor	12,340	5.65%	*	2	+ 2
Total	218,325			39	

This is a list of House of Assembly results for the 1938 South Australian state election.

== Results by electoral district ==
=== Adelaide ===
1938 South Australian state election: Adelaide
Party	Candidate	Votes	%	±%
Independent Labor	Bert Edwards	2,740	29.8	
Independent Labor	Doug Bardolph	2,367	25.8	
Liberal and Country	Duncan Menzies	1,541	16.8	
Labor	Bob Dale	1,250	13.6	
Independent	Patrick Flannagan	1,146	12.5	
Independent Labor	John Atkins	144	1.6	
Total formal votes		9,188	94.9	
Informal votes		492	5.1	
Turnout		9,680	64.3	
Two-candidate-preferred result
Independent Labor	Doug Bardolph	5,502	59.9	
Independent Labor	Bert Edwards	3,686	40.1	
Independent Labor gain from Labor		Swing		

=== Albert ===
1938 South Australian state election: Albert
Party	Candidate	Votes	%	±%
Liberal and Country	Malcolm McIntosh	2,146	54.6	
Independent	Gwynfred Oram	1,237	31.5	
Independent	John McNamara	549	14.0	
Total formal votes		3,932	98.6	
Informal votes		57	1.4	
Turnout		3,989	71.9	
Liberal and Country hold		Swing	N/A	

- Preferences were not distributed.

=== Alexandra ===
1938 South Australian state election: Alexandra
Party	Candidate	Votes	%	±%
Independent	George Connor	2,085	50.4	
Liberal and Country	Herbert Hudd	2,056	49.6	
Total formal votes		4,141	98.6	
Informal votes		59	1.4	
Turnout		4,200	64.3	
Independent gain from Liberal and Country		Swing		

=== Angas ===
1938 South Australian state election: Angas
Party	Candidate	Votes	%	±%
Liberal and Country	Reginald Rudall	1,998	47.3	
Independent	Walter Langdon Parsons	684	16.2	
Labor	Karl Metz	669	15.8	
Independent	William Haese	478	11.3	
Independent	Albert Mills	399	9.4	
Total formal votes		4,228	97.1	
Informal votes		128	2.9	
Turnout		4,356	74.9	
After distribution of preferences
Liberal and Country	Reginald Rudall	2,171	51.3	
Independent	Walter Langdon Parsons	1,182	28.0	
Labor	Karl Metz	875	20.7	
Liberal and Country hold		Swing		

- Preferences were not distributed to completion.

=== Burnside ===
1938 South Australian state election: Burnside
Party	Candidate	Votes	%	±%
Liberal and Country	Charles Abbott	4,400	47.1	
Independent	Stanley Gray	2,624	28.1	
Labor	Herbert Slater	1,366	14.6	
Democratic Women's	Jeanne Young	961	10.3	
Total formal votes		9,351	98.3	
Informal votes		162	1.7	
Turnout		9,513	60.1	
Two-party-preferred result
Liberal and Country	Charles Abbott	4,795	51.3	
Independent	Stanley Gray	4,556	48.7	
Liberal and Country hold		Swing		

=== Burra ===
1938 South Australian state election: Burra
Party	Candidate	Votes	%	±%
Liberal and Country	Archibald McDonald	1,530	39.1	
Labor	Thomas Canny	1,181	30.2	
Independent	Even George	742	19.0	
Independent	Maurice Collins	456	11.7	
Total formal votes		3,909	98.8	
Informal votes		48	1.2	
Turnout		3,957	75.3	
Two-party-preferred result
Liberal and Country	Archibald McDonald	2,305	59.0	
Labor	Thomas Canny	1,604	41.0	
Liberal and Country hold		Swing		

=== Chaffey ===
1938 South Australian state election: Chaffey
Party	Candidate	Votes	%	±%
Independent	William MacGillivray	975	29.7	
Liberal and Country	Cuthbert Ruston	881	26.8	
Independent	Henry Denman	529	16.1	
Labor	Robert Lambert	522	15.8	
Liberal and Country	Alan Kelly	381	11.6	
Total formal votes		3,288	95.8	
Informal votes		143	4.2	
Turnout		3,431	59.7	
Two-party-preferred result
Independent	William MacGillivray	1,960	59.6	
Liberal and Country	Cuthbert Ruston	1,328	40.4	
Independent gain from Liberal and Country		Swing		

=== Eyre ===
1938 South Australian state election: Eyre
Party	Candidate	Votes	%	±%
Liberal and Country	Arthur Christian	1,869	50.6	
Independent	Arnold Schubert	994	26.9	
Independent	Carl Bohlin	831	22.5	
Total formal votes		3,694	96.9	
Informal votes		118	3.1	
Turnout		3,812	63.5	
Liberal and Country hold		Swing		

- Preferences were not distributed.

=== Flinders ===
1938 South Australian state election: Flinders
Party	Candidate	Votes	%	±%
Single Tax League	Edward Craigie	1,451	34.9	
Liberal and Country	Rex Pearson	1,272	30.6	
Labor	John O'Leary	1,117	26.9	
Independent	Percy Provis	315	7.6	
Total formal votes		4,155	97.6	
Informal votes		103	2.4	
Turnout		4,258	69.9	
Two-candidate-preferred result
Single Tax League	Edward Craigie	2,516	60.6	
Liberal and Country	Rex Pearson	1,639	39.4	
Single Tax League hold		Swing		

=== Frome ===
1938 South Australian state election: Frome
Party	Candidate	Votes	%	±%
Labor	Mick O'Halloran	1,604	51.0	
Liberal and Country	Frederick Adams	1,174	37.3	
Independent	Samuel Jones	369	11.7	
Total formal votes		3,147	98.5	
Informal votes		49	1.5	
Turnout		3,196	77.2	

- Preferences were not distributed.

=== Gawler ===
1938 South Australian state election: Gawler
Party	Candidate	Votes	%	±%
Labor	Leslie Duncan	1,178	29.0	
Independent	William Duggan	1,123	27.7	
Liberal and Country	William Noack	1,090	26.9	
Independent	Adolph Ey	443	10.9	
Independent	Lindsay Yelland	224	5.5	
Total formal votes		4,058	97.3	
Informal votes		111	2.7	
Turnout		4,169	74.9	
Two-party-preferred result
Labor	Leslie Duncan	2,464	60.7	
Liberal and Country	William Noack	1,594	39.3	
Labor hold		Swing		

=== Glenelg ===
1938 South Australian state election: Glenelg
Party	Candidate	Votes	%	±%
Independent	William Fisk	3,831	40.5	
Liberal and Country	Ernest Anthoney	3,793	40.1	
Labor	Thomas Barker	1,825	19.3	
Total formal votes		9,449	98.4	
Informal votes		154	1.6	
Turnout		9,603	59.9	
Two-candidate-preferred result
Independent	William Fisk	5,295	56.0	
Liberal and Country	Ernest Anthoney	4,154	44.0	
Independent gain from Liberal and Country		Swing		

=== Goodwood ===
1938 South Australian state election: Goodwood
Party	Candidate	Votes	%	±%
Labor	David Fraser	3,214	42.0	
Independent	George Illingworth	2,062	26.9	
Liberal and Country	Alfred Cox	1,483	19.4	
Independent	Jack Hick	901	11.8	
Total formal votes		7,660	97.9	
Informal votes		166	2.1	
Turnout		7,826	55.6	
Two-candidate-preferred result
Independent	George Illingworth	3,946	51.5	
Labor	David Fraser	3,714	48.5	
Independent gain from Labor		Swing		

=== Gouger ===
1938 South Australian state election: Gouger
Party	Candidate	Votes	%	±%
Independent	Albert Robinson	2,123	54.8	
Liberal and Country	Henry Crosby	1,751	45.2	
Total formal votes		3,874	98.4	
Informal votes		64	1.6	
Turnout		3,938	74.8	
Independent gain from Liberal and Country		Swing		

=== Gumeracha ===
1938 South Australian state election: Gumeracha
Party	Candidate	Votes	%	±%
Liberal and Country	Thomas Playford	2,081	65.3	
Independent	Robert Hunter	556	17.5	
Labor	Arthur Edwards	549	17.2	
Total formal votes		3,186	98.3	
Informal votes		55	1.7	
Turnout		3,241	56.4	
Liberal and Country hold		Swing		

- Preferences were not distributed.

=== Hindmarsh ===
1938 South Australian state election: Hindmarsh
Party	Candidate	Votes	%	±%
Labor	John McInnes	4,920	52.7	
Independent	James Treloar	4,424	47.3	
Total formal votes		9,344	98.0	
Informal votes		188	2.0	
Turnout		9,532	54.2	
Labor hold		Swing		

=== Light ===
1938 South Australian state election: Light
Party	Candidate	Votes	%	±%
Liberal and Country	Richard Butler	2,463	48.9	
Independent	Moses Gabb	1,598	31.7	
Labor	Kevin McEntee	558	11.1	
Independent	Edmund Craig	267	5.3	
Independent	Edgar Willis	148	2.9	
Total formal votes		5,034	97.8	
Informal votes		111	2.2	
Turnout		5,145	82.9	
After distribution of preferences
Liberal and Country	Richard Butler	2,518	50.0	
Independent	Moses Gabb	1,886	37.5	
Labor	Kevin McEntee	630	12.5	
Liberal and Country hold		Swing		

- Preferences were not distributed to completion.

=== Mitcham ===
1938 South Australian state election: Mitcham
Party	Candidate	Votes	%	±%
Liberal and Country	Henry Dunks	5,019	54.2	
Labor	Frank Walsh	1,966	21.2	
Independent	Clarence Goode	1,559	16.8	
Independent	Nelson Clark	722	7.8	
Total formal votes		9,266	98.5	
Informal votes		136	1.5	
Turnout		9,402	61.4	
Liberal and Country hold		Swing		

- Preferences were not distributed.

=== Mount Gambier ===
1938 South Australian state election: Mount Gambier
Party	Candidate	Votes	%	±%
Independent	John Fletcher	1,694	36.1	
Labor	Francis Young	1,689	36.0	
Liberal and Country	Henry Kennedy	1,312	27.9	
Total formal votes		4,695	98.2	
Informal votes		87	1.8	
Turnout		4,782	71.8	
Two-candidate-preferred result
Independent	John Fletcher	2,725	58.0	
Labor	Francis Young	1,970	42.0	
Independent gain from Labor		Swing		

=== Murray ===
1938 South Australian state election: Murray
Party	Candidate	Votes	%	±%
Independent Labor	Richard McKenzie	1,494	34.1	
Liberal and Country	George Morphett	1,445	33.0	
Independent	P H Suter	858	19.6	
Labor	John Cassidy	583	13.3	
Total formal votes		4,380	98.4	
Informal votes		72	1.6	
Turnout		4,452	69.7	
Two-candidate-preferred result
Independent	Richard McKenzie	2,434	55.6	
Liberal and Country	George Morphett	1,946	44.4	
Independent gain from Liberal and Country		Swing		

=== Newcastle ===
1938 South Australian state election: Newcastle
Party	Candidate	Votes	%	±%
Liberal and Country	George Jenkins	2,060	67.5	
Labor	James Marner	993	32.5	
Total formal votes		3,053	97.8	
Informal votes		68	2.2	
Turnout		3,121	64.7	
Liberal and Country hold		Swing		

=== Norwood ===
1938 South Australian state election: Norwood
Party	Candidate	Votes	%	±%
Labor	Frank Nieass	3,050	33.7	
Liberal and Country	Walter Hamilton	2,614	28.9	
Women's Non-Party	Millicent Bowering	1,821	20.1	
Independent	Henry Austin	788	8.7	
Independent	William Hardy	785	8.7	
Total formal votes		9,058	96.6	
Informal votes		322	3.4	
Turnout		9,380	56.6	
Two-party-preferred result
Labor	Frank Nieass	4,803	53.0	
Liberal and Country	Walter Hamilton	4,255	47.0	
Labor gain from Liberal and Country		Swing		

=== Onkaparinga ===
1938 South Australian state election: Onkaparinga
Party	Candidate	Votes	%	±%
Liberal and Country	Howard Shannon	1,870	44.0	
Independent	Frank Staniford	1,396	32.9	
Labor	Tom Howard	984	23.2	
Total formal votes		4,250	98.4	
Informal votes		71	1.6	
Turnout		4,321	63.8	
Two-candidate-preferred result
Liberal and Country	Howard Shannon	2,175	51.2	
Independent	Frank Staniford	2,075	48.8	
Liberal and Country hold		Swing		

=== Port Adelaide ===
1938 South Australian state election: Port Adelaide
Party	Candidate	Votes	%	±%
Labor	James Stephens	6,590	75.2	
Independent	Raphael Cilento	2,179	24.8	
Total formal votes		8,769	96.6	
Informal votes		310	3.4	
Turnout		9,079	53.1	
Labor hold		Swing		

=== Port Pirie ===
1938 South Australian state election: Port Pirie
Party	Candidate	Votes	%	±%
Labor	Andrew Lacey	unopposed		
Labor hold		Swing		

=== Prospect ===
1938 South Australian state election: Prospect
Party	Candidate	Votes	%	±%
Liberal and Country	Elder Whittle	4,758	46.3	
Labor	Joseph Connelly	3,021	29.4	
Independent	Arthur Gray	2,249	21.9	
Independent	Ruth Ravenscroft	241	2.4	
Total formal votes		10,269	98.6	
Informal votes		141	1.4	
Turnout		10,410	62.9	
Two-party-preferred result
Liberal and Country	Elder Whittle	6,262	61.0	
Labor	Joseph Connelly	4,007	39.0	
Liberal and Country hold		Swing		

=== Ridley ===
1938 South Australian state election: Ridley
Party	Candidate	Votes	%	±%
Independent	Tom Stott	2,985	65.6	
Liberal and Country	Francis Petch	1,565	34.4	
Total formal votes		4,550	99.2	
Informal votes		38	0.8	
Turnout		4,588	70.7	
Independent hold		Swing		

=== Rocky River ===
1938 South Australian state election: Rocky River
Party	Candidate	Votes	%	±%
Liberal and Country	John Lyons	2,041	50.2	
Independent	Michael Noonan	712	17.5	
Labor	Edgar Russell	707	17.4	
Independent	William Nicholls	603	14.8	
Total formal votes		4,063	98.4	
Informal votes		66	1.6	
Turnout		4,129	78.5	
Liberal and Country hold		Swing		

- Preferences were not distributed.

=== Semaphore ===
1938 South Australian state election: Semaphore
Party	Candidate	Votes	%	±%
Labor	Albert Thompson	4,849	58.4	
Independent	Charles Grant	1,261	15.2	
Independent	Harry Bray	1,211	14.6	
Independent	Herbert Guthrie	984	11.8	
Total formal votes		8,305	97.6	
Informal votes		203	2.4	
Turnout		8,508	56.2	
Labor hold		Swing		

=== Stanley ===
1938 South Australian state election: Stanley
Party	Candidate	Votes	%	±%
Liberal and Country	Alexander Melrose	1,441	35.1	
Independent	Percy Quirke	1,344	32.7	
Independent Liberal	Samuel Dennison	1,320	32.2	
Total formal votes		4,105	99.0	
Informal votes		41	1.0	
Turnout		4,146	75.8	
Two-candidate-preferred result
Liberal and Country	Alexander Melrose	2,272	55.3	
Independent	Percy Quirke	1,833	44.7	
Liberal and Country hold		Swing		

=== Stirling ===
1938 South Australian state election: Stirling
Party	Candidate	Votes	%	±%
Independent	Samuel Pearce	1,597	37.0	
Independent	Herbert Dunn	1,503	34.8	
Liberal and Country	Percy Heggaton	1,214	28.1	
Total formal votes		4,314	98.7	
Informal votes		58	1.3	
Turnout		4,372	68.2	
Two-candidate-preferred result
Independent	Herbert Dunn	2,401	55.7	
Independent	Samuel Pearce	1,913	44.3	
Independent gain from Liberal and Country		Swing		

=== Stuart ===
1938 South Australian state election: Stuart
Party	Candidate	Votes	%	±%
Labor	Lindsay Riches	unopposed		
Labor hold		Swing		

=== Thebarton ===
1938 South Australian state election: Thebarton
Party	Candidate	Votes	%	±%
Labor	Marie Skitch	2,735	31.8	
Independent	Jules Langdon	2,373	27.5	
Independent	Charles Lloyd	1,876	21.8	
Independent	Alfred Blackwell	1,171	13.6	
Independent	Leonard Smith	449	5.2	
Total formal votes		8,604	96.5	
Informal votes		313	3.5	
Turnout		8,917	55.1	
Two-candidate-preferred result
Independent	Jules Langdon	5,122	59.5	
Labor	Marie Skitch	3,482	40.5	
Independent hold		Swing		

=== Torrens ===
1938 South Australian state election: Torrens
Party	Candidate	Votes	%	±%
Liberal and Country	Shirley Jeffries	4,777	44.4	
Labor	Raymond Davis	3,537	32.9	
Independent	Ernest Hannaford	2,444	22.7	
Total formal votes		10,758	97.9	
Informal votes		228	2.1	
Turnout		10,986	59.1	
Two-party-preferred result
Liberal and Country	Shirley Jeffries	5,959	55.4	
Labor	Raymond Davis	4,799	44.6	
Liberal and Country hold		Swing		

=== Unley ===
1938 South Australian state election: Unley
Party	Candidate	Votes	%	±%
Independent	John McLeay	4,356	40.7	
Liberal and Country	Horace Hogben	3,750	35.0	
Labor	Thomas Grealy	2,596	24.3	
Total formal votes		10,702	98.5	
Informal votes		161	1.5	
Turnout		10,863	60.5	
Two-candidate-preferred result
Independent	John McLeay	6,076	56.8	
Liberal and Country	Horace Hogben	4,626	43.2	
Independent gain from Liberal and Country		Swing		

=== Victoria ===
1938 South Australian state election: Victoria
Party	Candidate	Votes	%	±%
Independent	Clement Smith	1,755	36.3	
Liberal and Country	Vernon Petherick	1,678	34.8	
Labor	John Daly	1,396	28.9	
Total formal votes		4,829	97.8	
Informal votes		107	2.2	
Turnout		4,936	70.6	
Two-candidate-preferred result
Independent	Clement Smith	2,816	58.3	
Liberal and Country	Vernon Petherick	2,013	41.7	
Independent gain from Liberal and Country		Swing		

=== Wallaroo ===
1938 South Australian state election: Wallaroo
Party	Candidate	Votes	%	±%
Labor	Robert Richards	2,475	54.2	
Independent	Cecil Chapman	2,091	45.8	
Total formal votes		4,566	98.5	
Informal votes		67	1.5	
Turnout		4,633	79.7	
Labor hold		Swing		

=== Yorke Peninsula ===
1938 South Australian state election: Yorke Peninsula
Party	Candidate	Votes	%	±%
Independent	Daniel Davies	2,725	56.3	
Liberal and Country	Alexander Ferguson	2,114	43.7	
Total formal votes		4,839	99.1	
Informal votes		44	0.9	
Turnout		4,883	73.4	
Independent hold		Swing		

=== Young ===
1938 South Australian state election: Young
Party	Candidate	Votes	%	±%
Liberal and Country	Robert Nicholls	2,111	63.7	
Independent	Leonard Young	733	22.1	
Independent	Herman Dolling	468	14.1	
Total formal votes		3,312	97.9	
Informal votes		70	2.1	
Turnout		3,382	70.5	
Liberal and Country hold		Swing		

- Preferences were not distributed.

== See also ==
- Candidates of the 1938 South Australian state election
- Members of the South Australian House of Assembly, 1938–1941
