= Candidates of the 1938 South Australian state election =

This is a list of candidates of the 1938 South Australian state election. At this election, the House of Assembly shifted from multi-member to single-member electorates. Combined with the partisan turmoil of the previous two terms, this change led several previously party-affiliated figures to contest the election as independents.

== Retiring MPs ==
=== Labor ===
- John Pedler (Wallaroo) – lost preselection
- William Threadgold (Port Pirie) – lost preselection

=== Liberal and Country League ===
- Ronald Hunt (Victoria) – lost preselection
- Herbert Lyons (Barossa) – retired
- Victor Marra Newland (North Adelaide) – retired
- Baden Pattinson (Yorke Peninsula) – retired
- Frank Perry (East Torrens) – lost preselection
- Henry Tassie MLC (Central No. 2 District) – lost preselection

== Legislative Assembly ==
Sitting members are shown in bold text. Successful candidates are marked with an asterisk.

Electorate	Labor candidates	Liberal and Country candidates	Other candidates
Adelaide	**Bob Dale**	Duncan Menzies	John Atkins (Ind. Labor); **Doug Bardolph*** (Ind. Labor); Bert Edwards (Ind. Labor); P. J. Flannagan (Ind.)
Albert		**Malcolm McIntosh***	J. J. A. McNamara (Ind.); Gwynfred Oram (Ind.)
Alexandra		**Herbert Hudd**	**George Connor*** (Ind.)
Angas	K. E. A. O. Metz	**Reginald Rudall***	W. F. Haese (Ind.); A. V. Mills (Ind.); Walter Langdon Parsons (Ind.)
Burnside	H. A. Slater	**Charles Abbott***	S. R. Gray (Ind.); Jeanne Young (Ind.)
Burra	T. J. Canny	**Archibald McDonald***	Maurice Collins (Ind.); Even George (Ind.)
Chaffey	R. G. Lambert	A. H. Kelly; C. S. Ruston	H. S. Denman (Ind.); William MacGillivray* (Ind.)
Eyre		**Arthur Christian***	C. O. J. Bohlin (Ind.); A. I. Schubert (Ind.)
Flinders	J. V. O'Leary	Rex Pearson	**Edward Craigie*** (Single Tax); P. V. Provis (Ind.)
Frome	Mick O'Halloran*	F. P. Adams	S. D. Jones (Ind.)
Gawler	Leslie Duncan*	W. D. Noack	W. T. Duggan (Ind.); A. L. F. Ey (Ind.); Lindsay Yelland (Ind.)
Glenelg	T. J. D. Barker	**Ernest Anthoney**	William Fisk* (Ind.)
Goodwood	D. S. Fraser	A. B. Cox	J. H. B. Hick (Ind.); George Illingworth* (Ind.)
Gouger		**Henry Crosby**	**Albert Robinson*** (Ind.)
Gumeracha	A. S. Edwards	**Thomas Playford IV***	Robert Hunter (Ind.)
Hindmarsh	**John McInnes***		J. L. S. Treloar (Ind. Labor)
Light	K. V. McEntee	**Richard Layton Butler***	E. E. Craig (Ind.); Moses Gabb (Ind.); E. G. E. Willis (Ind.)
Mitcham	Frank Walsh	**Henry Dunks***	N. S. Clark (Ind.); Clarence Goode (Ind.)
Mount Gambier	F. E. Young	H. L. Kennedy	John Fletcher* (Ind.)
Murray	J. T. Cassidy	**George Cummins Morphett**	Richard McKenzie* (Ind. Labor); P. H. Suter (Ind.)
Newcastle	J. S. Marner	**George Jenkins***	
Norwood	Frank Nieass*	**Walter Hamilton**	H. C. Austin (Ind.); M. M. Bowering (Ind.); W. E. Hardy (Ind.)
Onkaparinga	Tom Howard	**Howard Shannon***	Frank Staniford (Ind.)
Port Adelaide	**James Stephens***		R. A. Cilento (Ind.)
Port Pirie	**Andrew Lacey***		
Prospect	Joseph Connelly	**Elder Whittle***	A. G. O. Gray (Ind.); R. O. Ravenscroft (Ind.)
Ridley		F. J. Petch	**Tom Stott*** (Ind.)
Rocky River	Edgar Russell	**John Lyons***	W. F. Nicholls (Ind.); M. J. Noonan (Ind.)
Semaphore	**Albert Thompson***		H. W. Bray (Ind.); C. R. Grant (Ind.); Herbert Guthrie (Ind.)
Stanley		**Alexander Melrose***	**Samuel Dennison** (Ind.); Percy Quirke (Ind.)
Stirling		**Percy Heggaton**	Herbert Dunn* (Ind.); S. H. Pearce (Ind.)
Stuart	**Lindsay Riches***		
Torrens	R. W. Davis	**Shirley Jeffries***	Ernest Hannaford (Ind.)
Thebarton	M. E. Skitch		**Alfred Blackwell** (Ind.); Jules Langdon* (Ind.); C. W. Lloyd (Ind.); L. J. Smith (Ind.)
Unley	T. W. Grealy	**Horace Hogben**	John McLeay, Sr.* (Ind.)
Victoria	John Daly	**Vernon Petherick**	Clement Smith* (Ind.)
Wallaroo	**Robert Richards***		C. T. Chapman (Ind.)
Yorke Peninsula		A. B. Ferguson	Daniel Davies* (Ind.)
Young		**Robert Nicholls***	H. A. Dolling (Ind.); L. E. Young (Ind.)

== Legislative Council ==
Electorate	Labor candidates	Liberal and Country candidates	Grouped Independent candidates	Ungrouped candidates
Central District No. 1 (2)	Frank Condon*; Fred Walsh		Joseph Anderson*; J. H. Clouston	
Central District No. 2 (2)	William Daniels; T. H. Shiels	Edward Holden*; James Wallace Sandford*		
Northern District (2)	James Beerworth; Charles Davis	Lyell McEwin*; George Ritchie*		J. A. Wood
Midland District (2)		Walter Gordon Duncan*; David Gordon*	R. L. D. Bonner; J. St. L. Honner	
Southern District (2)		John Cowan*; Reuben Cranstoun Mowbray	Frank Halleday*; Alec Bagot	
