= Electoral results for the district of Victoria =

South Australian district election results

This is a list of election results for the electoral district of Victoria in South Australian elections.

== Members for Victoria ==
Single member (1857–1862)
Member	Party	Term
Robert Leake		1857–1857
George Hawker		1858–1865

Two members (1862–1902)
Member	Party	Term	Member	Party	Term
George Hawker		1862–1865	Randolph Stow		1862–1865
Adam Gordon		1865–1866	John Riddoch		1865–1870
James Umpherston		1866–1868	John Riddoch		1865–1870
Henry Kent Hughes		1868–1870	John Riddoch		1865–1870
Park Laurie		1870–1871	William Paltridge		1870–1871
Park Laurie		1870–1871	Neville Blyth		1871–1871
John Riddoch		1871–1873	Edwin Derrington		1871–1873
Park Laurie		1873–1875	T. Wilde Boothby		1873–1875
George Hawker		1875–1883	John Ingleby		1875–1877
George Hawker		1875–1883	Lavington Glyde		1877–1884
William Whinham		1883–1884	Lavington Glyde		1877–1884
Friedrich Krichauff		1884–1890	John Bagot		1884–1887
Friedrich Krichauff		1884–1890	Daniel Livingston		1887–1888
Friedrich Krichauff		1884–1890	John Osman		1888–1893
James Cock		1890–1899	John Osman		1888–1893
James Cock		1890–1899	George Riddoch	Defence League	1893–1896
James Cock		1890–1899	James Morris		1896–1902
John Livingston		1899–1902	James Morris		1896–1902
Two members (1915–1938)
Member	Party	Term	Member	Party	Term
Peter Reidy	Labor	1915–1917	Clarence Goode	Labor	1915–1917
Peter Reidy	National	1917–1923	Clarence Goode	National	1917–1918
Peter Reidy	National	1917–1923	Vernon Petherick	Liberal Union	1918–1923
Peter Reidy	Liberal Federation	1923–1932	Vernon Petherick	Liberal Federation	1923–1924
Peter Reidy	Liberal Federation	1923–1932	Eric Shepherd	Labor	1924–1933
Peter Reidy	Liberal Federation	1923–1932	Eric Shepherd	Parliamentary Labor	1931–1933
Vernon Petherick	Liberal and Country	1932–1938	Eric Shepherd	Parliamentary Labor	1931–1933
Vernon Petherick	Liberal and Country	1932–1938	Ronald Hunt	Liberal and Country	1933–1938

Single-member (1938–1993)
Member	Party	Term
Clement Smith	Independent	1938–1941
Vernon Petherick	Liberal and Country	1941–1945
Jim Corcoran	Labor	1945–1947
Roy McLachlan	Liberal and Country	1947–1953
Jim Corcoran	Labor	1953–1956
Leslie Harding	Liberal and Country	1956–1965
Allan Rodda	Liberal and Country	1965–1974
Allan Rodda	Liberal	1974–1985
Dale Baker	Liberal	1985–1993

== Election results ==
=== Elections in the 1980s ===
1989 South Australian state election: Victoria
Party	Candidate	Votes	%	±%
Liberal	Dale Baker	12,892	68.9	+19.5
Labor	Ray Tunks	4,401	23.5	−3.6
Democrats	Johannes Cullen	1,420	7.6	+4.8
Total formal votes		18,713	98.2	+1.7
Informal votes		348	1.8	−1.7
Turnout		19,061	94.7	+0.2
Two-party-preferred result
Liberal	Dale Baker	13,706	73.2	+4.9
Labor	Ray Tunks	5,007	26.8	−4.9
Liberal hold		Swing	+4.9	

1985 South Australian state election: Victoria
Party	Candidate	Votes	%	±%
Liberal	Dale Baker	9,074	49.4	−10.6
Labor	Bill Hender	4,972	27.1	−1.9
National	Geoff Clothier	3,797	20.7	+12.7
Democrats	Roy Milne	518	2.8	+0.2
Total formal votes		18,361	96.5	
Informal votes		662	3.5	
Turnout		19,023	94.5	
Two-party-preferred result
Liberal	Dale Baker	12,549	68.3	+0.3
Labor	Bill Hender	5,812	31.7	−0.3
Liberal hold		Swing	+0.3	

1982 South Australian state election: Victoria
Party	Candidate	Votes	%	±%
Liberal	Allan Rodda	8,023	55.7	−12.3
Labor	Simon Bryant	4,427	30.7	−1.3
National	Geoffrey Clothier	1,559	10.8	+10.8
Democrats	Peter Butcher	398	2.8	+2.8
Total formal votes		14,407	95.5	−0.4
Informal votes		673	4.5	+0.4
Turnout		15,080	94.3	+1.0
Two-party-preferred result
Liberal	Allan Rodda	9,592	66.6	−1.4
Labor	Simon Bryant	4,815	33.4	+1.4
Liberal hold		Swing	−1.4	

=== Elections in the 1970s ===
1979 South Australian state election: Victoria
Party	Candidate	Votes	%	±%
Liberal	Allan Rodda	9,476	68.0	+2.7
Labor	Terry Roberts	4,451	32.0	−2.7
Total formal votes		13,927	95.9	−2.0
Informal votes		596	4.1	+2.0
Turnout		14,523	93.3	−0.5
Liberal hold		Swing	+2.7	

1977 South Australian state election: Victoria
Party	Candidate	Votes	%	±%
Liberal	Allan Rodda	9,285	65.3	+12.9
Labor	Graeme Richardson	4,923	34.7	+8.4
Total formal votes		14,208	97.9	
Informal votes		306	2.1	
Turnout		14,514	93.8	
Liberal hold		Swing	−5.1	

1975 South Australian state election: Victoria
Party	Candidate	Votes	%	±%
Liberal	Allan Rodda	6,500	64.1	0.0
Labor	Jean Hillier	1,698	16.7	+16.7
National	Graham Carrick	1,145	11.3	−24.6
Liberal Movement	Colin Hall	796	7.9	+7.9
Total formal votes		10,139	97.6	+3.8
Informal votes		251	2.4	−3.8
Turnout		10,390	93.7	−1.0
Two-party-preferred result
Liberal	Allan Rodda	8,055	79.4	+15.3
Labor	Jean Hillier	2,084	20.6	+20.6
Liberal hold		Swing	N/A	

1973 South Australian state election: Victoria
Party	Candidate	Votes	%	±%
Liberal and Country	Allan Rodda	5,768	64.1	+5.7
Country	Graham Carrick	3,232	35.9	+20.7
Total formal votes		9,000	93.8	−4.9
Informal votes		598	6.2	+4.9
Turnout		9,598	94.7	−0.9
Liberal and Country hold		Swing	N/A	

1970 South Australian state election: Victoria
Party	Candidate	Votes	%	±%
Liberal and Country	Allan Rodda	5,383	58.4	
Labor	Eileen Bennett	2,435	26.4	
National	Leonard Roberts	1,406	15.2	
Total formal votes		9,224	98.7	
Informal votes		121	1.3	
Turnout		9,345	95.6	
Two-party-preferred result
Liberal and Country	Allan Rodda	6,648	72.1	
Labor	Eileen Bennett	2,576	27.9	
Liberal and Country hold		Swing		

=== Elections in the 1960s ===
1968 South Australian state election: Victoria
Party	Candidate	Votes	%	±%
Liberal and Country	Allan Rodda	4,439	62.3	+11.2
Labor	Reginald Jordan	1,942	28.1	−11.4
Independent	Alfred Donnelly	527	7.6	+7.6
Total formal votes		6,908	97.9	−1.2
Informal votes		149	2.1	+1.2
Turnout		7,057	95.6	+0.4
Two-party-preferred result
Liberal and Country	Allan Rodda	4,703	68.1	+9.8
Labor	Reginald Jordan	2,205	31.9	−9.8
Liberal and Country hold		Swing	+9.8	

1965 South Australian state election: Victoria
Party	Candidate	Votes	%	±%
Liberal and Country	Allan Rodda	3,511	51.1	−2.6
Labor	David Walker	2,713	39.5	−6.8
National	James McLachlan	421	6.1	+6.1
Independent	John Gartner	221	3.2	+3.2
Total formal votes		6,866	99.1	+0.1
Informal votes		59	0.9	−0.1
Turnout		6,925	95.2	+0.1
Two-party-preferred result
Liberal and Country	Allan Rodda	4,001	58.3	+4.6
Labor	David Walker	2,865	41.7	−4.6
Liberal and Country hold		Swing	+4.6	

1962 South Australian state election: Victoria
Party	Candidate	Votes	%	±%
Liberal and Country	Leslie Harding	3,651	53.7	−3.0
Labor	Alfred Donnelly	3,147	46.3	+8.5
Total formal votes		6,798	99.0	0.0
Informal votes		67	1.0	0.0
Turnout		6,865	95.1	−0.1
Liberal and Country hold		Swing	−7.7	

=== Elections in the 1950s ===
1959 South Australian state election: Victoria
Party	Candidate	Votes	%	±%
Liberal and Country	Leslie Harding	3,841	56.7	−5.0
Labor	David Walker	2,557	37.8	−0.5
Democratic Labor	John Gartner	374	5.5	+5.5
Total formal votes		6,772	99.0	+0.4
Informal votes		67	1.0	−0.4
Turnout		6,839	95.2	+1.1
Two-party-preferred result
Liberal and Country	Leslie Harding		61.4	−0.3
Labor	David Walker		38.6	+0.3
Liberal and Country hold		Swing	−0.3	

- Two party preferred vote was estimated.

1956 South Australian state election: Victoria
Party	Candidate	Votes	%	±%
Liberal and Country	Leslie Harding	3,841	61.7	
Labor	Victor Sparrow	2,385	38.3	
Total formal votes		6,226	98.6	
Informal votes		90	1.4	
Turnout		9,316	94.1	
Liberal and Country hold		Swing		

1953 South Australian state election: Victoria
Party	Candidate	Votes	%	±%
Labor	Jim Corcoran	4,795	49.4	+2.1
Liberal and Country	Roy McLachlan	4,639	47.8	−4.9
Independent	John Gartner	278	2.9	+2.9
Total formal votes		9,712	98.7	−0.3
Informal votes		126	1.3	+0.3
Turnout		9,838	95.5	+1.1
Two-party-preferred result
Labor	Jim Corcoran		50.8	+3.5
Liberal and Country	Roy McLachlan		49.2	−3.5
Labor gain from Liberal and Country		Swing	+3.5	

1950 South Australian state election: Victoria
Party	Candidate	Votes	%	±%
Liberal and Country	Roy McLachlan	4,716	52.7	+2.5
Labor	Jim Corcoran	4,235	47.3	−2.5
Total formal votes		8,951	99.0	+2.2
Informal votes		90	1.0	−2.2
Turnout		9,041	94.4	−2.4
Liberal and Country hold		Swing	+2.5	

=== Elections in the 1940s ===
1947 South Australian state election: Victoria
Party	Candidate	Votes	%	±%
Liberal and Country	Roy McLachlan	4,193	50.2	+0.3
Labor	Jim Corcoran	4,167	49.8	+3.9
Total formal votes		8,360	98.3	+0.2
Informal votes		146	1.7	−0.2
Turnout		8,506	96.8	+6.7
Liberal and Country hold		Swing	−1.9	

1944 South Australian state election: Victoria
Party	Candidate	Votes	%	±%
Liberal and Country	Vernon Petherick	3,530	49.9	+12.9
Labor	Jim Corcoran	3,244	45.9	+11.8
Independent	John Gartner	296	4.2	+4.2
Total formal votes		7,070	98.1	−0.2
Informal votes		135	1.9	+0.2
Turnout		7,205	90.1	+29.2
Two-party-preferred result
Liberal and Country	Vernon Petherick	3,687	52.1	−4.6
Labor	Jim Corcoran	3,383	47.9	+4.6
Liberal and Country hold		Swing	−4.6	

1941 South Australian state election: Victoria
Party	Candidate	Votes	%	±%
Liberal and Country	Vernon Petherick	1,741	37.0	+2.2
Labor	John Daly	1,604	34.1	+5.2
Independent	Clement Smith	1,361	28.9	−7.4
Total formal votes		4,706	98.3	+0.5
Informal votes		79	1.7	−0.5
Turnout		4,785	60.9	−9.7
Two-party-preferred result
Liberal and Country	Vernon Petherick	2,670	56.7	−1.6
Labor	John Daly	2,036	43.3	+43.3
Liberal and Country hold		Swing	N/A	

=== Elections in the 1930s ===
1938 South Australian state election: Victoria
Party	Candidate	Votes	%	±%
Independent	Clement Smith	1,755	36.3	
Liberal and Country	Vernon Petherick	1,678	34.8	
Labor	John Daly	1,396	28.9	
Total formal votes		4,829	97.8	
Informal votes		107	2.2	
Turnout		4,936	70.6	
Two-candidate-preferred result
Independent	Clement Smith	2,816	58.3	
Liberal and Country	Vernon Petherick	2,013	41.7	
Independent gain from Liberal and Country		Swing		
