= Results of the 1950 South Australian state election (House of Assembly) =

South Australian state election, 4 March 1950 House of Assembly << 1947–1953 >>
Enrolled voters	311,658				
Votes cast	290,306		Turnout	93.15%	–0.22%
Informal votes	9,667		Informal	3.33%	–0.30%
Summary of votes by party
Party	Primary votes	%	Swing	Seats	Change
Labor	134,952	48.09%	–0.55%	12	– 1
Liberal and Country	113,673	40.51%	+0.12%	23	± 0
Communist	3,749	1.34%	–1.63%	0	± 0
Independent	28,265	10.07%	+3.87%	4	+ 1
Total	280,639			39	
Two-party-preferred
Liberal and Country		51.30%	–0.70%		
Labor		48.70%	+0.70%		

This is a list of House of Assembly results for the 1950 South Australian state election.

== Results by electoral district ==
=== Adelaide ===
1950 South Australian state election: Adelaide
Party	Candidate	Votes	%	±%
Labor	Sam Lawn	4,857	38.3	−12.4
Independent	Bert Edwards	4,177	33.0	+33.0
Independent	Doug Bardolph	1,940	15.3	−23.0
Independent	W J Welsh	1,695	13.4	+13.4
Total formal votes		12,669	92.3	+2.6
Informal votes		1,059	7.7	−2.6
Turnout		13,728	90.7	+1.2
Two-candidate-preferred result
Labor	Sam Lawn	7,161	56.5	
Independent	Bert Edwards	5,508	43.5	
Labor hold		Swing	N/A	

=== Albert ===
1950 South Australian state election: Albert
Party	Candidate	Votes	%	±%
Liberal and Country	Malcolm McIntosh	unopposed		
Liberal and Country hold		Swing		

=== Alexandra ===
1950 South Australian state election: Alexandra
Party	Candidate	Votes	%	±%
Liberal and Country	David Brookman	unopposed		
Liberal and Country hold		Swing		

=== Angas ===
1950 South Australian state election: Angas
Party	Candidate	Votes	%	±%
Liberal and Country	Berthold Teusner	4,418	75.9	+5.6
Independent	Henry Schneider	1,403	24.1	+24.1
Total formal votes		5,821	97.0	−0.4
Informal votes		179	3.0	+0.4
Turnout		6,000	96.3	+0.3
Liberal and Country hold		Swing	N/A	

=== Burnside ===
1950 South Australian state election: Burnside
Party	Candidate	Votes	%	±%
Liberal and Country	Geoffrey Clarke	unopposed		
Liberal and Country hold		Swing		

=== Burra ===
1950 South Australian state election: Burra
Party	Candidate	Votes	%	±%
Liberal and Country	George Hawker	2,633	61.3	+2.8
Labor	Even George	1,661	38.7	−2.8
Total formal votes		4,294	99.0	+0.2
Informal votes		44	1.0	−0.2
Turnout		4,338	94.7	−0.6
Liberal and Country hold		Swing	+2.8	

=== Chaffey ===
1950 South Australian state election: Chaffey
Party	Candidate	Votes	%	±%
Independent	William MacGillivray	2,711	40.3	−19.0
Liberal and Country	Ross Story	2,363	35.1	+35.1
Labor	Robert Lambert	1,653	24.6	−16.1
Total formal votes		6,727	97.3	−0.2
Informal votes		186	2.7	+0.2
Turnout		6,913	95.4	+1.3
Two-candidate-preferred result
Independent	William MacGillivray	4,084	60.7	+1.4
Liberal and Country	Ross Story	2,643	39.3	+39.3
Independent hold		Swing	N/A	

=== Eyre ===
1950 South Australian state election: Eyre
Party	Candidate	Votes	%	±%
Liberal and Country	Arthur Christian	unopposed		
Liberal and Country hold		Swing		

=== Flinders ===
1950 South Australian state election: Flinders
Party	Candidate	Votes	%	±%
Liberal and Country	Rex Pearson	unopposed		
Liberal and Country hold		Swing		

=== Frome ===
1950 South Australian state election: Frome
Party	Candidate	Votes	%	±%
Labor	Mick O'Halloran	unopposed		
Labor hold		Swing		

=== Gawler ===
1950 South Australian state election: Gawler
Party	Candidate	Votes	%	±%
Labor	Leslie Duncan	3,179	54.2	+0.5
Liberal and Country	Eldred Riggs	2,686	45.8	−0.5
Total formal votes		5,865	98.9	+0.5
Informal votes		64	1.1	−0.5
Turnout		5,929	95.4	+0.3
Labor hold		Swing	+0.5	

=== Glenelg ===
1950 South Australian state election: Glenelg
Party	Candidate	Votes	%	±%
Liberal and Country	Baden Pattinson	13,673	62.3	+1.7
Labor	John Sexton	8,272	37.7	+2.3
Total formal votes		21,945	97.3	+0.2
Informal votes		617	2.7	−0.2
Turnout		22,562	93.9	0.0
Liberal and Country hold		Swing	N/A	

=== Goodwood ===
1950 South Australian state election: Goodwood
Party	Candidate	Votes	%	±%
Labor	Frank Walsh	11,131	54.5	+3.5
Liberal and Country	Herbert Kemp	9,288	45.5	−3.5
Total formal votes		20,419	98.4	+1.2
Informal votes		341	1.6	−1.2
Turnout		20,760	92.9	−0.4
Labor hold		Swing	+3.5	

=== Gouger ===
1950 South Australian state election: Gouger
Party	Candidate	Votes	%	±%
Liberal and Country	Rufus Goldney	4,036	70.5	+6.5
Labor	Archibald Riddoch	1,685	29.5	−6.5
Total formal votes		5,721	97.8	−0.2
Informal votes		127	2.2	+0.2
Turnout		5,848	95.6	+0.6
Liberal and Country hold		Swing	+6.5	

=== Gumeracha ===
1950 South Australian state election: Gumeracha
Party	Candidate	Votes	%	±%
Liberal and Country	Thomas Playford	unopposed		
Liberal and Country hold		Swing		

=== Hindmarsh ===
1950 South Australian state election: Hindmarsh
Party	Candidate	Votes	%	±%
Labor	Cyril Hutchens	unopposed		
Labor hold		Swing		

=== Light ===
1950 South Australian state election: Light
Party	Candidate	Votes	%	±%
Liberal and Country	Herbert Michael	unopposed		
Liberal and Country hold		Swing		

=== Mitcham ===
1950 South Australian state election: Mitcham
Party	Candidate	Votes	%	±%
Liberal and Country	Henry Dunks	12,384	68.5	+1.4
Labor	Charles Smith	5,684	31.5	−1.4
Total formal votes		18,068	98.4	+0.4
Informal votes		291	1.6	−0.4
Turnout		18,359	92.5	−0.4
Liberal and Country hold		Swing	+1.4	

=== Mount Gambier ===
1950 South Australian state election: Mount Gambier
Party	Candidate	Votes	%	±%
Independent	John Fletcher	4,905	64.4	−2.0
Labor	John Shepherdson	2,717	35.6	+2.0
Total formal votes		7,622	98.4	+0.2
Informal votes		125	1.6	−0.2
Turnout		7,747	93.7	−0.7
Independent hold		Swing	−2.0	

=== Murray ===
1950 South Australian state election: Murray
Party	Candidate	Votes	%	±%
Labor	Richard McKenzie	3,247	50.8	−4.6
Liberal and Country	Hector White	3,143	49.2	+4.6
Total formal votes		6,390	98.3	−0.2
Informal votes		108	1.7	+0.2
Turnout		6,498	95.4	−0.5
Labor hold		Swing	−4.6	

=== Newcastle ===
1950 South Australian state election: Newcastle
Party	Candidate	Votes	%	±%
Liberal and Country	George Jenkins	2,601	71.3	−28.7
Labor	Leonard Pilton	1,048	28.7	+28.7
Total formal votes		3,649	98.9	
Informal votes		40	1.1	
Turnout		3,689	86.1	
Liberal and Country hold		Swing	N/A	

=== Norwood ===
1950 South Australian state election: Norwood
Party	Candidate	Votes	%	±%
Liberal and Country	Roy Moir	9,081	54.3	+2.9
Labor	Edward Souter	7,336	43.9	−4.7
Communist	Alfred Watt	305	1.8	+1.8
Total formal votes		16,722	94.9	−2.4
Informal votes		894	5.1	+2.4
Turnout		17,616	93.7	+0.5
Two-party-preferred result
Liberal and Country	Roy Moir		54.5	+3.1
Labor	Edward Souter		45.5	−3.1
Liberal and Country hold		Swing	+3.1	

- Two party preferred vote was estimated.

=== Onkaparinga ===
1950 South Australian state election: Onkaparinga
Party	Candidate	Votes	%	±%
Liberal and Country	Howard Shannon	4,530	61.1	+10.7
Labor	Frank Staniford	2,887	38.9	+5.1
Total formal votes		7,417	98.6	+0.7
Informal votes		107	1.4	−0.7
Turnout		7,524	94.9	−0.2
Liberal and Country hold		Swing	N/A	

=== Port Adelaide ===
1950 South Australian state election: Port Adelaide
Party	Candidate	Votes	%	±%
Labor	James Stephens	20,091	90.2	+7.6
Communist	Peter Symon	2,185	9.8	−7.6
Total formal votes		22,276	94.6	+2.2
Informal votes		1,277	5.4	−2.2
Turnout		23,553	92.8	−0.9
Labor hold		Swing	+7.6	

=== Port Pirie ===
1950 South Australian state election: Port Pirie
Party	Candidate	Votes	%	±%
Labor	Charles Davis	4,965	69.5	−30.5
Independent	Charles Emery	1,155	16.2	+16.2
Independent	Leslie Kyte	1,027	14.4	+14.4
Total formal votes		7,147	90.9	
Informal votes		714	9.1	
Turnout		7,861	95.0	
Labor hold		Swing	N/A	

- Preferences were not distributed.

=== Prospect ===
1950 South Australian state election: Prospect
Party	Candidate	Votes	%	±%
Liberal and Country	Elder Whittle	10,603	55.5	+1.2
Labor	James Marner	7,883	41.2	−4.5
Communist	Alan Finger	626	3.3	+3.3
Total formal votes		19,112	95.5	−2.3
Informal votes		892	4.5	+2.3
Turnout		20,004	94.5	+0.7
Two-party-preferred result
Liberal and Country	Elder Whittle		55.8	+1.5
Labor	James Marner		44.2	−1.5
Liberal and Country hold		Swing	+1.5	

- Two party preferred vote was estimated.

=== Ridley ===
1950 South Australian state election: Ridley
Party	Candidate	Votes	%	±%
Independent	Tom Stott	unopposed		
Independent hold		Swing		

=== Rocky River ===
1950 South Australian state election: Rocky River
Party	Candidate	Votes	%	±%
Liberal and Country	James Heaslip	unopposed		
Liberal and Country hold		Swing		

=== Semaphore ===
1950 South Australian state election: Semaphore
Party	Candidate	Votes	%	±%
Labor	Harold Tapping	15,173	80.5	−19.5
Independent	Joseph Talbot	3,681	19.5	+19.5
Total formal votes		18,854	94.2	
Informal votes		1,155	5.8	
Turnout		20,009	92.1	
Labor hold		Swing	N/A	

=== Stanley ===
1950 South Australian state election: Stanley
Party	Candidate	Votes	%	±%
Independent	Percy Quirke	2,335	47.2	+47.2
Liberal and Country	Alexander Knappstein	1,755	35.5	−14.4
Labor	Cyril Hasse	856	17.3	−32.8
Total formal votes		4,946	98.8	−0.1
Informal votes		60	1.2	+0.1
Turnout		5,006	96.9	+1.4
Two-candidate-preferred result
Independent	Percy Quirke	2,970	60.0	
Liberal and Country	Alexander Knappstein	1,976	40.0	
Independent gain from Labor		Swing	N/A	

=== Stirling ===
1950 South Australian state election: Stirling
Party	Candidate	Votes	%	±%
Liberal and Country	Herbert Dunn	3,711	56.6	−43.4
Independent	William Jenkins	2,844	43.4	+43.4
Total formal votes		6,555	98.3	
Informal votes		115	1.7	
Turnout		6,670	95.2	
Liberal and Country hold		Swing	N/A	

=== Stuart ===
1950 South Australian state election: Stuart
Party	Candidate	Votes	%	±%
Labor	Lindsay Riches	8,219	92.8	+5.3
Communist	John Sendy	633	7.2	−5.3
Total formal votes		8,852	96.2	0.0
Informal votes		352	3.8	0.0
Turnout		9,204	85.5	−0.3
Labor hold		Swing	+5.3	

=== Thebarton ===
1950 South Australian state election: Thebarton
Party	Candidate	Votes	%	±%
Labor	Fred Walsh	unopposed		
Labor hold		Swing		

=== Torrens ===
1950 South Australian state election: Torrens
Party	Candidate	Votes	%	±%
Liberal and Country	Shirley Jeffries	9,954	54.5	−0.5
Labor	Herbert Baldock	8,299	45.5	+0.5
Total formal votes		18,253	98.2	+0.9
Informal votes		339	1.8	−0.9
Turnout		18,592	92.2	−0.4
Liberal and Country hold		Swing	−0.5	

=== Unley ===
1950 South Australian state election: Unley
Party	Candidate	Votes	%	±%
Liberal and Country	Colin Dunnage	10,048	57.8	−1.3
Labor	Leslie McLean Wright	7,335	42.2	+1.3
Total formal votes		17,383	98.0	+0.5
Informal votes		360	2.0	−0.5
Turnout		17,743	92.3	−0.8
Liberal and Country hold		Swing	−1.3	

=== Victoria ===
1950 South Australian state election: Victoria
Party	Candidate	Votes	%	±%
Liberal and Country	Roy McLachlan	4,716	52.7	+2.5
Labor	Jim Corcoran	4,235	47.3	−2.5
Total formal votes		8,951	99.0	+2.2
Informal votes		90	1.0	−2.2
Turnout		9,041	94.4	−2.4
Liberal and Country hold		Swing	+2.5	

=== Wallaroo ===
1950 South Australian state election: Wallaroo
Party	Candidate	Votes	%	±%
Labor	Hughie McAlees	2,539	51.0	−10.1
Liberal and Country	Leslie Heath	2,050	41.2	+2.3
Independent	Spence Crosby	392	7.9	+7.9
Total formal votes		4,981	97.4	−0.9
Informal votes		131	2.6	+0.9
Turnout		5,112	95.2	+0.1
Two-party-preferred result
Labor	Hughie McAlees		58.1	−3.0
Liberal and Country	Leslie Heath		41.9	+3.0
Labor hold		Swing	−3.0	

- Two party preferred vote was estimated.

=== Yorke Peninsula ===
1950 South Australian state election: Yorke Peninsula
Party	Candidate	Votes	%	±%
Liberal and Country	Cecil Hincks	unopposed		
Liberal and Country hold		Swing		

=== Young ===
1950 South Australian state election: Young
Party	Candidate	Votes	%	±%
Liberal and Country	Robert Nicholls	unopposed		
Liberal and Country hold		Swing		

== See also ==
- Candidates of the 1950 South Australian state election
- Members of the South Australian House of Assembly, 1950–1953
