= Electoral results for the district of Goodwood =

South Australian district election results

This is a list of election results for the electoral district of Goodwood in South Australian elections.

== Members for Goodwood ==
Member	Party	Term
George Illingworth	Independent	1938–1941
Frank Walsh	Labor	1941–1956

== Election results ==
=== Elections in the 1950s ===
1953 South Australian state election: Goodwood
Party	Candidate	Votes	%	±%
Labor	Frank Walsh	15,057	63.1	+8.6
Liberal and Country	Howard Zelling	8,795	36.9	−8.6
Total formal votes		23,852	97.6	−0.8
Informal votes		577	2.4	+0.8
Turnout		24,429	94.7	+1.8
Labor hold		Swing	+8.6	

1950 South Australian state election: Goodwood
Party	Candidate	Votes	%	±%
Labor	Frank Walsh	11,131	54.5	+3.5
Liberal and Country	Herbert Kemp	9,288	45.5	−3.5
Total formal votes		20,419	98.4	+1.2
Informal votes		341	1.6	−1.2
Turnout		20,760	92.9	−0.4
Labor hold		Swing	+3.5	

=== Elections in the 1940s ===
1947 South Australian state election: Goodwood
Party	Candidate	Votes	%	±%
Labor	Frank Walsh	8,720	51.0	−8.5
Liberal and Country	Herbert Kemp	8,388	49.0	+8.5
Total formal votes		17,108	97.2	+0.7
Informal votes		489	2.8	−0.7
Turnout		17,597	93.3	+5.7
Labor hold		Swing	−8.5	

1944 South Australian state election: Goodwood
Party	Candidate	Votes	%	±%
Labor	Frank Walsh	8,883	59.5	+14.7
Liberal and Country	Archibald MacMillan	6,051	40.5	+10.3
Total formal votes		14,934	96.5	−1.9
Informal votes		543	3.5	+1.9
Turnout		15,477	87.6	+43.2
Labor hold		Swing	+8.8	

1941 South Australian state election: Goodwood
Party	Candidate	Votes	%	±%
Labor	Frank Walsh	3,103	44.8	+2.8
Liberal and Country	Hartley Dall	2,094	30.2	+10.8
Independent	George Illingworth	1,732	25.0	−1.9
Total formal votes		6,929	98.4	+0.5
Informal votes		109	1.6	−0.5
Turnout		7,038	44.4	−11.2
Two-party-preferred result
Labor	Frank Walsh	3,516	50.7	+2.2
Liberal and Country	Hartley Dall	3,413	49.3	+49.3
Labor gain from Independent		Swing	N/A	

=== Elections in the 1930s ===
1938 South Australian state election: Goodwood
Party	Candidate	Votes	%	±%
Labor	David Fraser	3,214	42.0	
Independent	George Illingworth	2,062	26.9	
Liberal and Country	Alfred Cox	1,483	19.4	
Independent	Jack Hick	901	11.8	
Total formal votes		7,660	97.9	
Informal votes		166	2.1	
Turnout		7,826	55.6	
Two-candidate-preferred result
Independent	George Illingworth	3,946	51.5	
Labor	David Fraser	3,714	48.5	
Independent gain from Labor		Swing		
