= Electoral results for the district of Thebarton =

South Australian district election results

This is a list of election results for the electoral district of Thebarton in South Australian elections.

== Members for Thebarton ==
Member	Party	Term
Jules Langdon	Independent	1938–1942
Fred Walsh	Labor	1942–1956

== Election results ==
=== Elections in the 1950s ===
1953 South Australian state election: Thebarton
Party	Candidate	Votes	%	±%
Labor	Fred Walsh	unopposed		
Labor hold		Swing		

1950 South Australian state election: Thebarton
Party	Candidate	Votes	%	±%
Labor	Fred Walsh	unopposed		
Labor hold		Swing		

=== Elections in the 1940s ===
1947 South Australian state election: Thebarton
Party	Candidate	Votes	%	±%
Labor	Fred Walsh	unopposed		
Labor hold		Swing		

1944 South Australian state election: Thebarton
Party	Candidate	Votes	%	±%
Labor	Fred Walsh	unopposed		
Labor gain from Independent		Swing	N/A	

1941 South Australian state election: Thebarton
Party	Candidate	Votes	%	±%
Independent	Jules Langdon	3,484	52.6	+25.1
Labor	Sid O'Flaherty	3,141	47.4	+15.6
Total formal votes		6,625	97.0	+0.5
Informal votes		204	3.0	−0.5
Turnout		6,829	40.5	−14.6
Independent hold		Swing	−6.9	

=== Elections in the 1930s ===
1938 South Australian state election: Thebarton
Party	Candidate	Votes	%	±%
Labor	Marie Skitch	2,735	31.8	
Independent	Jules Langdon	2,373	27.5	
Independent	Charles Lloyd	1,876	21.8	
Independent	Alfred Blackwell	1,171	13.6	
Independent	Leonard Smith	449	5.2	
Total formal votes		8,604	96.5	
Informal votes		313	3.5	
Turnout		8,917	55.1	
Two-candidate-preferred result
Independent	Jules Langdon	5,122	59.5	
Labor	Marie Skitch	3,482	40.5	
Independent hold		Swing		
