= Electoral results for the district of Angas =

South Australian district election results

This is a list of election results for the electoral district of Angas in South Australian elections.

== Members for Angas ==
Member	Party	Term
Reginald Rudall	Liberal and Country	1938–1944
Berthold Teusner	Liberal and Country	1944–1970

== Election results ==
=== Elections in the 1960s ===
1968 South Australian state election: Angas
Party	Candidate	Votes	%	±%
Liberal and Country	Berthold Teusner	4,351	68.0	−32.0
Labor	Brian Chatterton	2,045	32.0	+32.0
Total formal votes		6,396	97.9	
Informal votes		135	2.1	
Turnout		6,531	96.1	
Liberal and Country hold		Swing	N/A	

1965 South Australian state election: Angas
Party	Candidate	Votes	%	±%
Liberal and Country	Berthold Teusner	unopposed		
Liberal and Country hold		Swing		

1962 South Australian state election: Angas
Party	Candidate	Votes	%	±%
Liberal and Country	Berthold Teusner	unopposed		
Liberal and Country hold		Swing		

=== Elections in the 1950s ===
1959 South Australian state election: Angas
Party	Candidate	Votes	%	±%
Liberal and Country	Berthold Teusner	4,081	64.7	−12.9
Labor	Harley Ladd	2,229	35.3	+35.3
Total formal votes		6,310	98.8	+1.1
Informal votes		74	1.2	−1.1
Turnout		6,384	96.8	+1.1
Liberal and Country hold		Swing	N/A	

1956 South Australian state election: Angas
Party	Candidate	Votes	%	±%
Liberal and Country	Berthold Teusner	4,655	77.6	
Independent	William Viney	1,344	22.4	
Total formal votes		5,999	97.7	
Informal votes		142	2.3	
Turnout		6,141	95.7	
Liberal and Country hold		Swing		

1953 South Australian state election: Angas
Party	Candidate	Votes	%	±%
Liberal and Country	Berthold Teusner	4,088	68.1	−7.8
Independent	Henry Schneider	1,914	31.9	+7.8
Total formal votes		6,002	97.1	−0.9
Informal votes		176	2.9	+0.9
Turnout		6,178	96.7	+0.4
Liberal and Country hold		Swing	−7.8	

1950 South Australian state election: Angas
Party	Candidate	Votes	%	±%
Liberal and Country	Berthold Teusner	4,418	75.9	+5.6
Independent	Henry Schneider	1,403	24.1	+24.1
Total formal votes		5,821	97.0	−0.4
Informal votes		179	3.0	+0.4
Turnout		6,000	96.3	+0.3
Liberal and Country hold		Swing	N/A	

=== Elections in the 1940s ===
1947 South Australian state election: Angas
Party	Candidate	Votes	%	±%
Liberal and Country	Berthold Teusner	3,960	70.3	+17.7
Independent	Frank Rieck	1,672	29.7	+29.7
Total formal votes		5,632	97.4	−1.4
Informal votes		152	2.6	+1.4
Turnout		5,784	96.0	+5.8
Liberal and Country hold		Swing	N/A	

1944 South Australian state election: Angas (supplementary)
Party	Candidate	Votes	%	±%
Liberal and Country	Berthold Teusner	2,767	52.6	+2.4
Labor	William Robinson	2,099	39.9	−20.2
Independent	William Haese	397	7.5	−22.6
Total formal votes		5,263	98.8	+0.5
Informal votes		64	1.2	−0.5
Turnout		5,327	90.2	+26.2
Liberal and Country hold		Swing	N/A	

- Preferences were not distributed.

1941 South Australian state election: Angas
Party	Candidate	Votes	%	±%
Liberal and Country	Reginald Rudall	1,842	50.2	+2.9
Independent	William Haese	1,105	30.1	+18.8
Labor	Johann Schulz	723	19.7	+3.9
Total formal votes		3,670	98.3	+1.2
Informal votes		63	1.7	−1.2
Turnout		3,733	64.0	−10.9
Liberal and Country hold		Swing	N/A	

- Preferences were not distributed.

=== Elections in the 1930s ===
1938 South Australian state election: Angas
Party	Candidate	Votes	%	±%
Liberal and Country	Reginald Rudall	1,998	47.3	
Independent	Walter Langdon Parsons	684	16.2	
Labor	Karl Metz	669	15.8	
Independent	William Haese	478	11.3	
Independent	Albert Mills	399	9.4	
Total formal votes		4,228	97.1	
Informal votes		128	2.9	
Turnout		4,356	74.9	
After distribution of preferences
Liberal and Country	Reginald Rudall	2,171	51.3	
Independent	Walter Langdon Parsons	1,182	28.0	
Labor	Karl Metz	875	20.7	
Liberal and Country hold		Swing		

- Preferences were not distributed to completion.
