= Edgar Dawes =

Australian politician

Leader of the South Australian Labor Party
- In office 12 May 1932 – 22 April 1933
- Preceded by: Lionel Hill
- Succeeded by: Andrew Lacey

Member of the South Australian Parliament for Sturt
- In office 5 April 1930 – 8 April 1933
- Preceded by: Edward Vardon
- Succeeded by: Horace Hogben

Personal details
- Born: Edgar Rowland Dawes; 28 November 1902; Stepney, South Australia
- Died: 5 August 1973 (aged 70); Royal Adelaide Hospital, Adelaide, South Australia
- Political party: Australian Labor Party (SA)
- Spouses: Adeline Melba Hurcombe (m. 1926; died 1965) Patricia Margaret Henderson (m. 1966; died 1973)

Edgar Rowland Dawes (28 November 1902 – 5 August 1973) was an Australian politician. He was a Labor Party member of the South Australian House of Assembly from 1930 until 1933, representing the electorate of Sturt. He was the leader of the official Labor Party in South Australia in the aftermath of the 1931 Labor split from May 1932 until his defeat at the 1933 state election.

== Early life ==
Dawes was born at Stepney, South Australia and was educated at Norwood School and Norwood High School. He apprenticed as an engineer at A. W. Dobbie & Co. Ltd., and later worked as a fitter and turner at the Islington Railway Workshops. He was the secretary of the South Australian branch of the Australian Society of Engineers from 1927 to 1941, president of the United Trades and Labour Council of South Australia in 1930–1931, and state president of the Labor Party.

== Parliamentary career and Labor leadership ==
Dawes was elected to the House of Assembly in the Labor victory at the 1930 election, defeating a Liberal Federation MP in the multi-member Sturt electorate. He remained loyal to official Labor in the 1931 Labor split, and as state president of the Labor Party, wound up being a spokesperson for the party during the split. In May 1932, when the remaining six-member Labor caucus decided to elect a parliamentary leader, they selected Dawes. Dawes elected to recontest Sturt at the April 1933 election even though it was a close marginal seat, and in the aftermath of the split lost to a Liberal Federation candidate.

== After state politics ==
Dawes was an unsuccessful candidate for the Australian Senate at the 1937 election and for the electorate of Adelaide at the 1940 federal election. In 1940, one newspaper described him as "one of the best known men in the Labor movement...and the strongest man in the party".

Post-politics, he worked for the state Department of Munitions from 1940 to 1945 and was vice-chairman of the Australian Broadcasting Corporation from 1944 to 1967. He was also a board member of the Royal Adelaide Hospital from 1933 to 1972, a council member of the Australian National University from 1951 to 1955, chair of the executive committee of the Adelaide Festival of Arts, and member of the Queen Elizabeth Hospital board and the Institute of Medical and Veterinary Science council.

After his first wife died, he married 24 year-old Patricia Henderson in March 1966. Dawes died at the Royal Adelaide Hospital in Adelaide in 1973.

Parliament of South Australia
Preceded by Herbert Richards; Edward Vardon	Member for Sturt; 1930–1933; Served alongside: Dale, Anthoney	Succeeded by Henry Dunks; Horace Hogben
Party political offices
Preceded by Lionel Hill	Leader of the Australian Labor Party (South Australian Branch); 1931 – 1933	Succeeded by Andrew Lacey
