= Electoral results for the district of Edwardstown =

South Australian district election results

This is a list of election results for the electoral district of Edwardstown in South Australian elections.

== Members for Edwardstown ==
Member	Party	Term
Frank Walsh	Labor	1956–1968
Geoff Virgo	Labor	1968–1970

== Election results ==
=== Elections in the 1960s ===
1968 South Australian state election: Edwardstown
Party	Candidate	Votes	%	±%
Labor	Geoff Virgo	18,055	57.5	−2.9
Liberal and Country	David Rogers	11,399	36.3	+4.0
Independent	Helen Anderson	1,948	6.2	+6.2
Total formal votes		31,402	98.0	0.0
Informal votes		645	2.0	0.0
Turnout		32,047	93.9	−1.0
Two-party-preferred result
Labor	Geoff Virgo	18,347	58.4	−3.4
Liberal and Country	David Rogers	13,055	41.6	+3.4
Labor hold		Swing	−3.4	

1965 South Australian state election: Edwardstown
Party	Candidate	Votes	%	±%
Labor	Frank Walsh	17,917	60.4	−11.2
Liberal and Country	Laurence Daly	9,578	32.3	+32.3
Democratic Labor	Allan Anderson	1,894	6.4	−22.0
Independent	Brian Waters	297	1.0	+1.0
Total formal votes		29,686	98.0	+1.9
Informal votes		599	2.0	−1.9
Turnout		30,285	94.9	+0.2
Two-party-preferred result
Labor	Frank Walsh	18,350	61.8	−9.8
Liberal and Country	Laurence Daly	11,336	38.2	+38.2
Labor hold		Swing	N/A	

1962 South Australian state election: Edwardstown
Party	Candidate	Votes	%	±%
Labor	Frank Walsh	19,513	71.6	+14.9
Democratic Labor	Daniel Faulkner	7,756	28.4	+20.7
Total formal votes		27,269	96.1	−1.9
Informal votes		1,114	3.9	+1.9
Turnout		28,383	94.7	+0.3
Labor hold		Swing	N/A	

=== Elections in the 1950s ===
1959 South Australian state election: Edwardstown
Party	Candidate	Votes	%	±%
Labor	Frank Walsh	13,894	56.7	−17.6
Liberal and Country	May Mills	8,726	35.6	+35.6
Democratic Labor	Daniel Faulkner	1,895	7.7	−18.0
Total formal votes		24,515	98.0	+2.0
Informal votes		503	2.0	−2.0
Turnout		25,018	94.4	+0.8
Two-party-preferred result
Labor	Frank Walsh		57.8	−16.5
Liberal and Country	May Mills		42.2	+42.2
Labor hold		Swing	N/A	

- Two party preferred vote was estimated.

1956 South Australian state election: Edwardstown
Party	Candidate	Votes	%	±%
Labor	Frank Walsh	15,366	74.3	
Labor (A-C)	Patrick Tippins	5,317	25.7	
Total formal votes		20,683	96.0	
Informal votes		858	4.0	
Turnout		21,541	93.6	
Labor hold		Swing		
