= Electoral district of Sturt =

Electoral district of Sturt may refer to:

- Electoral district of Sturt (New South Wales), a former electorate of the New South Wales Legislative Assembly
- Electoral district of Sturt (South Australia), a former electorate of the South Australian House of Assembly

== See also ==
- Division of Sturt, federal electorate in South Australia
- Electoral district of Stuart, state electorate South Australia
