= 1950 South Australian state election =

← 1947	4 March 1950	1953 →

All 39 seats in the South Australian House of Assembly 20 seats were needed for a majority
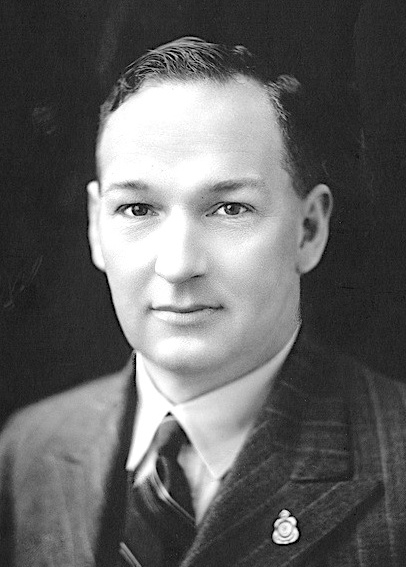

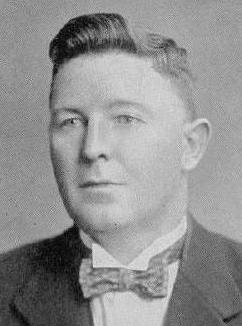
	First party	Second party
Leader	Thomas Playford	Mick O'Halloran
Party	Liberal and Country League	Labor
Leader since	5 November 1938	10 October 1949
Leader's seat	Gumeracha	Frome
Last election	23 seats	13 seats
Seats won	23 seats	12 seats
Seat change	0	▼1
Percentage	51.3%	48.7%
Swing	▼0.7	▲0.7
Premier before election
Thomas Playford
Liberal and Country League
Elected Premier
Thomas Playford
Liberal and Country League

State elections were held in South Australia on 4 March 1950. All 39 seats in the South Australian House of Assembly were up for election. The incumbent Liberal and Country League led by Premier of South Australia Thomas Playford IV defeated the Australian Labor Party led by Leader of the Opposition Mick O'Halloran.

== Background ==
Only one seat changed hands, rural Stanley saw the Labor member re-elected as an independent member. Notably, neither major party contested the independent-held seat of Ridley.

== Results ==
Arrangement of the House of Assembly after the 1950 state election.

South Australian state election, 4 March 1950 House of Assembly << 1947–1953 >>
Enrolled voters	311,658				
Votes cast	290,306		Turnout	93.15%	–0.22%
Informal votes	9,667		Informal	3.33%	–0.30%
Summary of votes by party
Party	Primary votes	%	Swing	Seats	Change
Labor	134,952	48.09%	–0.55%	12	– 1
Liberal and Country	113,673	40.51%	+0.12%	23	± 0
Communist	3,749	1.34%	–1.63%	0	± 0
Independent	28,265	10.07%	+3.87%	4	+ 1
Total	280,639			39	
Two-party-preferred
Liberal and Country		51.30%	–0.70%		
Labor		48.70%	+0.70%		

- The primary vote figures were from contested seats, while the statewide two-party-preferred vote figures were estimated from all seats.

== Post-election pendulum ==
LCL seats (23)
Marginal
Victoria	Roy McLachlan	LCL	2.7%
Norwood	Roy Moir	LCL	4.5%
Torrens	Shirley Jeffries	LCL	4.5%
Prospect	Elder Whittle	LCL	5.8%
Fairly safe
Stirling	Herbert Dunn	LCL	6.6% v IND
Unley	Colin Dunnage	LCL	7.8%
Safe
Onkaparinga	Howard Shannon	LCL	11.1%
Burra	George Hawker	LCL	11.3%
Glenelg	Baden Pattinson	LCL	12.3%
Mitcham	Henry Dunks	LCL	18.5%
Gouger	Rufus Goldney	LCL	20.5%
Newcastle	George Jenkins	LCL	21.3%
Angas	Berthold Teusner	LCL	25.9% v IND
Albert	Malcolm McIntosh	LCL	unopposed
Alexandra	David Brookman	LCL	unopposed
Burnside	Geoffrey Clarke	LCL	unopposed
Eyre	Arthur Christian	LCL	unopposed
Flinders	Rex Pearson	LCL	unopposed
Gumeracha	Thomas Playford	LCL	unopposed
Light	Herbert Michael	LCL	unopposed
Rocky River	James Heaslip	LCL	unopposed
Yorke Peninsula	Cecil Hincks	LCL	unopposed
Young	Robert Nicholls	LCL	unopposed

Labor seats (12)
Marginal
Murray	Richard McKenzie	ALP	0.8%
Gawler	Leslie Duncan	ALP	4.2%
Goodwood	Frank Walsh	ALP	4.5%
Fairly safe
Adelaide	Sam Lawn	ALP	6.5% v IND
Wallaroo	Hughie McAlees	ALP	8.1%
Safe
Semaphore	Harold Tapping	ALP	30.5% v IND
Port Adelaide	James Stephens	ALP	40.2% v COM
Stuart	Lindsay Riches	ALP	42.8% v COM
Port Pirie	Charles Davis	ALP	undistributed
Frome	Mick O'Halloran	ALP	unopposed
Hindmarsh	Cyril Hutchens	ALP	unopposed
Thebarton	Fred Walsh	ALP	unopposed
Crossbench seats (4)
Stanley	Percy Quirke	IND	10.0% v LCL
Chaffey	William MacGillivray	IND	10.7% v LCL
Mount Gambier	John Fletcher	IND	14.4% v ALP
Ridley	Tom Stott	IND	unopposed

== See also ==
- Results of the South Australian state election, 1950 (House of Assembly)
- Candidates of the 1950 South Australian state election
- Members of the South Australian House of Assembly, 1950-1953
- Members of the South Australian Legislative Council, 1950-1953
- Playmander
