= Electoral results for the Division of Angas =

Electoral results for the Division of Angas may refer to:

- Electoral results for the Division of Angas (1903–34)
- Electoral results for the Division of Angas (1949–77)
