= Electoral results for the Division of Angas (1903–1934) =

Australian division election results

This is a list of electoral results for the Division of Angas in Australian federal elections from the division's creation in 1903 until its abolition in 1934.

== Members ==
| Member | Party | Term |
|---|---|---|
| Paddy Glynn | Free Trade/Anti-Socialist | 1903–1909 |
| Paddy Glynn | Liberal | 1909–1917 |
| Paddy Glynn | Nationalist | 1917–1919 |
| Moses Gabb | Labor | 1919–1925 |
| Walter Parsons | Nationalist | 1925–1929 |
| Moses Gabb | Labor | 1929–1931 |
| Moses Gabb | Independent | 1931–1934 |

== Results ==
=== 1930s ===
==== 1931 ====
1931 Australian federal election: Angas
| Party | Candidate | Votes | % | ±% |
|---|---|---|---|---|
| Independent | Moses Gabb | 37,719 | 76.8 | +31.5 |
| Labor | David Fraser | 11,390 | 23.2 | −31.5 |
| Total formal votes | | 49,109 | 96.4 | |
| Informal votes | | 1,843 | 3.6 | |
| Turnout | | 50,952 | 96.7 | |
| Independent gain from Labor | | Swing | +31.5 | |

=== 1920s ===
==== 1929 ====
1929 Australian federal election: Angas
| Party | Candidate | Votes | % | ±% |
|---|---|---|---|---|
| Labor | Moses Gabb | 25,679 | 54.7 | +14.1 |
| Nationalist | Walter Parsons | 21,239 | 45.3 | −14.1 |
| Total formal votes | | 46,918 | 96.3 | |
| Informal votes | | 1,824 | 3.7 | |
| Turnout | | 48,742 | 96.3 | |
| Labor gain from Nationalist | | Swing | +14.1 | |

==== 1928 ====
1928 Australian federal election: Angas
| Party | Candidate | Votes | % | ±% |
|---|---|---|---|---|
| Nationalist | Walter Parsons | 25,372 | 59.4 | +9.1 |
| Labor | Michael Woods | 17,325 | 40.6 | −9.1 |
| Total formal votes | | 42,697 | 90.1 | |
| Informal votes | | 4,689 | 9.9 | |
| Turnout | | 47,386 | 95.3 | |
| Nationalist hold | | Swing | +9.1 | |

==== 1925 ====
1925 Australian federal election: Angas
| Party | Candidate | Votes | % | ±% |
|---|---|---|---|---|
| Nationalist | Walter Parsons | 20,428 | 50.3 | +50.3 |
| Labor | Moses Gabb | 20,178 | 49.7 | −8.3 |
| Total formal votes | | 40,606 | 96.1 | |
| Informal votes | | 1,640 | 3.9 | |
| Turnout | | 42,246 | 94.2 | |
| Nationalist gain from Labor | | Swing | +8.3 | |

==== 1922 ====
1922 Australian federal election: Angas
| Party | Candidate | Votes | % | ±% |
|---|---|---|---|---|
| Labor | Moses Gabb | 11,192 | 58.0 | +8.2 |
| Liberal | George Ritchie | 8,090 | 42.0 | +42.0 |
| Total formal votes | | 19,282 | 95.6 | |
| Informal votes | | 888 | 4.4 | |
| Turnout | | 20,170 | 51.0 | |
| Labor hold | | Swing | +7.8 | |

=== 1910s ===
==== 1919 ====
1919 Australian federal election: Angas
| Party | Candidate | Votes | % | ±% |
|---|---|---|---|---|
| Labor | Moses Gabb | 9,468 | 50.7 | +1.5 |
| Nationalist | Paddy Glynn | 9,217 | 49.3 | −1.5 |
| Total formal votes | | 18,685 | 96.8 | |
| Informal votes | | 615 | 3.2 | |
| Turnout | | 19,300 | 64.5 | |
| Labor gain from Nationalist | | Swing | +1.5 | |

==== 1917 ====
1917 Australian federal election: Angas
| Party | Candidate | Votes | % | ±% |
|---|---|---|---|---|
| Nationalist | Paddy Glynn | 10,031 | 50.8 | −49.2 |
| Labor | Sid O'Flaherty | 9,700 | 49.2 | +49.2 |
| Total formal votes | | 19,731 | 95.4 | |
| Informal votes | | 955 | 4.6 | |
| Turnout | | 20,686 | 69.6 | |
| Nationalist hold | | Swing | −49.2 | |

==== 1914 ====
1914 Australian federal election: Angas
| Party | Candidate | Votes | % | ±% |
|---|---|---|---|---|
| Liberal | Paddy Glynn | unopposed | | |
| Liberal hold | | Swing | | |

==== 1913 ====
1913 Australian federal election: Angas
| Party | Candidate | Votes | % | ±% |
|---|---|---|---|---|
| Liberal | Paddy Glynn | unopposed | | |
| Liberal hold | | Swing | | |

==== 1910 ====
1910 Australian federal election: Angas
| Party | Candidate | Votes | % | ±% |
|---|---|---|---|---|
| Liberal | Paddy Glynn | unopposed | | |
| Liberal hold | | Swing | | |

=== 1900s ===
==== 1906 ====
1906 Australian federal election: Angas
| Party | Candidate | Votes | % | ±% |
|---|---|---|---|---|
| Anti-Socialist | Paddy Glynn | 5,546 | 63.6 | −36.4 |
| Labour | Alexander Day | 3,177 | 36.4 | +36.4 |
| Total formal votes | | 8,273 | 94.5 | |
| Informal votes | | 503 | 5.5 | |
| Turnout | | 9,226 | 34.1 | |
| Anti-Socialist hold | | Swing | −36.4 | |

==== 1903 ====
1903 Australian federal election: Angas
| Party | Candidate | Votes | % | ±% |
|---|---|---|---|---|
| Free Trade | Paddy Glynn | unopposed | | |
| Free Trade win | | (new seat) | | |
