= Doug Bardolph =

Australian politician (1893 – 1951)

Douglas Henry Bardolph (18 February 1893 – 2 February 1951) was an Australian journalist, trade unionist and politician.

== History ==
Henry Bardolph (ca.1854 – 22 June 1933) and Mary Bardolph (née Taggart) had five sons, and lived at Manly, New South Wales, where they ran a refreshment room or wine bar. They moved to Victoria, where two sons (Donald Francis Bardolph and Harold Travers Bardolph) died of pneumonic influenza within a few days of each other in the epidemic of 1919, aged 31 and 28 respectively. The family moved to Adelaide around 1919; Henry set up in business as building contractor, notably responsible for the Unley Oval grandstand. Their youngest son, (Clement Patrick) Charles Bardolph, died in Adelaide in September 1926 aged 29 years.

Doug worked as a journalist and proprietor of the Unley News. He edited and published the South Australian Worker from 1930 to 1933; his brother Ken Bardolph published the Labor Weekly from 1931 to 1934. Both were members of the Labor Party and high-profile operators in the Union movement.

After a series of unsworn allegations of collusion and vote buying at a preselection ballot, a three-man committee of enquiry (Sampson, Burgess and Grealy) had both brothers sacked from the A.L.P. They, with other disaffected unionists, founded a South Australian chapter of the Lang Labor Party, with Doug as President. At a time of high and rising unemployment among the working classes, and dissatisfaction with both established political parties, the Lang message found ready acceptance. At the 1933 election, Lang Labor candidates Doug Bardolph, Bob Dale (who joined Lang Labor while a member for Sturt) and Tom Howard won all three seats in the multi-member Adelaide electorate. Other seats they contested were Port Adelaide, West Torrens and Legislative Council District No. 1. The A.L.P. applied to the Court of Disputed Returns to have the Adelaide election results overturned on various grounds, but failed.

In June 1934 the three South Australian Labor parties (A.L.P., Parliamentary Labor Party and Lang Labor) achieved a degree of unity, one of the prices of which was the re-admission of all expelled members, and Doug rejoined, but was disenfranchised in August 1935 when he refused to pay the amount of "sustentation fee" (a levy on A.L.P. parliamentarians) demanded of him. At the 1938 election, Doug, as a "Labor" candidate, independent of the A.L.P., contested and won the seat of Adelaide, which had become a single-member electorate. He was one of 14 of 39 lower house MPs at the election to be elected as an independent, which as a grouping won 40 percent of the primary vote, more than either of the major parties. Tom Stott was the de facto leader of the independent caucus within parliament.

At the 1944 election he, again as an independent "Labor" candidate, received the largest number of primary votes on 43.5 percent, but the A.L.P. candidate R. A. Dale on 37.2 percent won after Communist Alf Watt's preferences were distributed from their 19.4 percent vote, a South Australian Communist record. He stood for the same seat at the 1947 and 1950 elections, but received progressively lower support. He died of cancer in Croydon the following year. He never married. His brother Ken had rejoined the A.L.P. and served in the Legislative Council from 1941 to 1964, the year he died.

South Australian House of Assembly
| Preceded by Bill Denny | Member for Adelaide; 1933–1944; Served alongside: Bob Dale, Tom Howard | Succeeded by Bob Dale |
