= Tom Howard (Australian politician) =

Australian politician

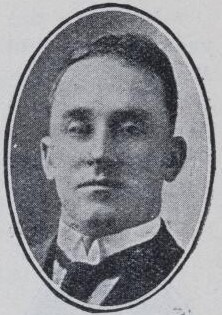

Thomas Patrick Howard (13 March 1880 – 9 July 1949) was an Australian trade unionist and politician. He was a member of the South Australian House of Assembly from 1933 to 1938, representing the Lang Labor Party (1933), South Australian Lang Labor Party (1933–1934) and Labor Party (1934–1938).

Howard was born in Gilbert Street, Adelaide, and educated at Christian Brothers College. He worked as a shop assistant in a warehouse before apprenticing as a painter and decorator in 1894, later working as a house painter. He became a delegate for the Labor Party in 1908, and was elected president of the Painters' Union in 1909. He became the union's assistant state secretary in 1913, and succeeded T. B. Merry as state secretary that December. He served as state secretary of the Painters and Decorators Union until 1934.

He was the secretary of the Anti-Conscription Campaign in 1916, represented his union on both the United Trades and Labour Council of South Australia and the United Labor Party, served on the union's federal council and was a member of the Painters and Decorators' Wages Board. In 1918, he was elected president of the Trades and Labor Council, and in 1920 shifted to the role of its secretary, which he would hold until 1932. He was an unsuccessful Labor candidate for the House of Assembly at the 1918 election, 1921 election and 1924 election, in the Liberal-leaning seats of Sturt and Barossa.

In 1933, in the wake of the Great Depression and the 1931 Labor split, Howard was elected to the South Australian House of Assembly for Adelaide, representing the Lang Labor Party, a faction of the Labor Party supporting the ideas of Jack Lang, the Premier of New South Wales. In April, however, he and fellow Lang Labor MP Bob Dale left the party after disputes with leader Doug Bardolph, forming their own breakaway group, the South Australian Lang Labor Party. In June 1934 the various Labor factions were reunited. Howard was defeated at the next election in 1938.

In 1945, he retired from the union movement and his then role as state secretary of the Shop Employees and Warehouse Employees' Union, citing failing hearing. He died at his home in Sturt Street, Adelaide in 1949, aged 69, and was buried in the Catholic Cemetery at West Terrace.
