= Jack Shepherd (politician) =

Australian politician

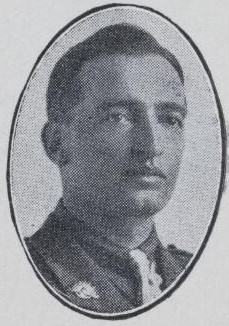

Eric John "Jack" Shepherd (19 June 1894 – 30 August 1967) was an Australian politician. He was the Labor member for Victoria in the South Australian House of Assembly from 1924 to 1933. From 1930 to 1933 he was Speaker of the House.

Shepherd had served in World War I in France and had won the Military Medal.

Parliament of South Australia
Preceded by Vernon Petherick	Member for Victoria; 1924–1933; Served alongside: Reidy, Petherick	Succeeded by Ronald Hunt
Preceded by George Laffer	Speaker of the South Australian House of Assembly; 1930–1933	Succeeded by Robert Nicholls
