= Electoral district of Edwardstown =

Former South Australian state electoral district

Coordinates: 34°58′48″S 138°34′16″E

Edwardstown South Australia—House of Assembly
- State: South Australia
- Created: 1956
- Abolished: 1970
- Namesake: Edwardstown, South Australia
- Demographic: Metropolitan

Edwardstown was an electoral district of the House of Assembly in the Australian state of South Australia from 1956 to 1970.

Edwardstown replaced the Electoral district of Goodwood, Frank Walsh being the last member for Goodwood. Edwardstown was replaced by the Electoral district of Ascot Park.

At the 2018 state election, the suburb of Edwardstown was in Labor seats of Badcoe.

== Members ==
Member	Party	Term
Frank Walsh	Labor	1956–1968
Geoff Virgo	Labor	1968–1970
