= George Illingworth =

Australian politician

George Walker Illingworth (27 February 1877 – 11 June 1950) was an Australian politician who represented the South Australian House of Assembly seat of Goodwood from 1938 to 1941 as an independent.

Illingworth was born at Shipley in Yorkshire. He arrived in Sydney at the age of seventeen, and moved to Adelaide in 1898 as secretary of Critic Proprietary Limited. He was involved with The Critic for 25 years, in later years as managing editor and part-proprietor. After leaving the newspaper in 1923, he was secretary of the Adelaide and Suburban Advertising Company Limited. In local politics, Illingworth served as alderman and councillor of the Corporate Town of Unley for a total of seventeen years, and was mayor from 1926 to 1928. He was also president of the Master Process Engravers' Association of South Australia and served on the state executive of the Boy Scout movement and the District and Bush Nursing Society and the state council of the YMCA. He unsuccessfully contested the 1918 state election in the seat of Sturt and the 1919 federal election in the seat of Boothby, both times as an independent.

Illingworth detested party politics and was outspoken on political issues for many years prior to his entry into state parliament. In World War I, as The Critic editor, he was a vehement supporter of conscription and of the formation of the Nationalist Party. In the 1920s, he condemned atrocities against Aboriginal people in north-western Australia. During the Great Depression, Illingworth called for the abolition both of award wages and conditions and working for rations, and supported public works to reduce unemployment. He also supported the abolition of state parliaments.

Illingworth was elected to the House of Assembly at the 1938 election as the independent member for Unley. After the 1938 election, he was one of 14 independent MPs in the 39-member House of Assembly; as a grouping they won 40 percent of the primary vote, more than either of the major parties, and Illingworth was selected as their convenor. He had campaigned on the introduction of single-member electorates in favour of reintroducing proportional representation, advocated outlawing party preselection of candidates, supported free education through to university, scripture reading in schools, and increased use of referendums on social questions, and opposed the 40-hour week, although advocating "shorter hours of labor where practicable". Illingworth was defeated at the 1941 election. He later referred to some of the gains of that term of parliament as having been the introduction of scripture reading in State schools, an attempt at introducing proportional representation that passed the committee stages, and the defeat of an extension of liquor trading hours.

He died in June 1950, and was buried at Mitcham Cemetery.
