= Jules Langdon =

Australian politician

Jules Langdon (31 May 1871 – 2 November 1942) was an Australian politician who represented the South Australian House of Assembly seat of Thebarton from 1938 to 1942 as an independent.

Langdon was born at Kapunda, and was a building contractor by trade, first at Kapunda and Anlaby Station and then after 1914 in Adelaide. He was a Corporate Town of Thebarton councillor from 1926 for many years, and was mayor from 1932 to 1937.

He was elected to the House of Assembly at the 1938 election, winning the new seat of Thebarton as an independent, campaigning on issues of employment and financial management. He had previously unsuccessfully contested West Torrens at the 1933 election. Langdon was one of 14 of 39 independent lower house MPs at the 1938 election, which as a grouping won 40 percent of the primary vote, more than either of the major parties.

He was re-elected at the 1941 election, but died at a private hospital in Adelaide on 2 November 1942, after having collapsed in Parliament House after delivering a speech on 29 October. He was buried at Mitcham Cemetery. One of his sons, Arthur Louis Langdon, was elected to his Thebarton council seat upon his death. A memorial fountain to Langdon at the corner of Henley Beach Road and Taylors Road, Thebarton was dedicated in May 1944.

Parliament of South Australia
New seat	Member for Thebarton; 1938–1942	Succeeded by Fred Walsh
