= Ronald Hunt (politician) =

Australian politician

Ronald William Rex Hunt (25 December 1897 – 7 June 1968) was an Australian politician. He was the Liberal and Country League member for Victoria in the South Australian House of Assembly from 1933 to 1938.

Parliament of South Australia
Preceded by Eric Shepherd	Member for Victoria; 1933–1938; Served alongside: Vernon Petherick	Succeeded by Clement Smith
