= Moses Gabb =

Australian politician

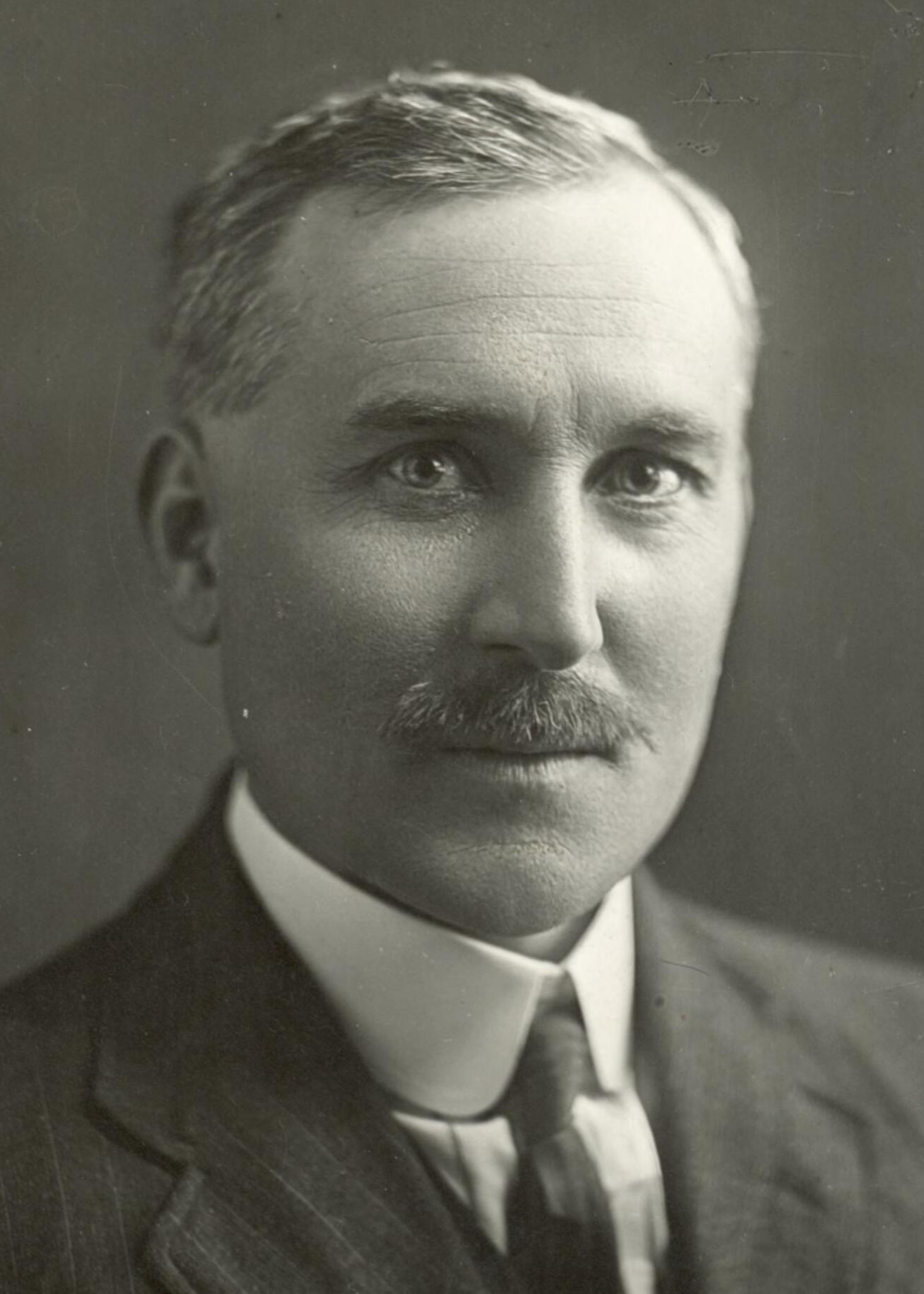

Member of the Australian Parliament for Angas
- In office 13 December 1919 – 14 November 1925
- Preceded by: Paddy Glynn
- Succeeded by: Walter Parsons
- In office 12 October 1929 – 7 August 1934
- Preceded by: Walter Parsons
- Succeeded by: Division abolished

Personal details
- Born: 21 November 1882 Glenelg, South Australia
- Died: 6 March 1951 (aged 68) Rosewater, South Australia
- Party: Labor (1919–31); Independent (1931–34)
- Spouse: Florence Ethel Hobbs
- Children: Sesom Gabb, Nance Gabb, Ruth Gabb, Glen Gabb
- Occupation: Church worker, greengrocer

Joel Moses Gabb (21 November 1882 – 6 March 1951) was an Australian politician. He was a member of the Australian House of Representatives from 1919 to 1934, representing the electorate of Angas. He represented the Australian Labor Party until resigning during the 1931 Labor split; however, he did not join the United Australia Party along with the other dissident MPs, and instead remained in parliament as an independent.

== Early life, missionary and business work ==
Gabb was born in Glenelg, and was educated at St Peter's College. He worked for printers A. & E. Lewis and then for grocers Barns, Stobie, & Co. after leaving school. He had studied at night to become a Methodist missionary while working at the grocers, and after qualifying for home mission work, worked from 1905 reopening a mission on Kangaroo Island, then at churches in Cockburn, Silverton, Kalangadoo and Penola, and on the Tea Tree Gully–Modbury circuit. He passed as a candidate for ministry and studied at Prince Alfred College in 1908, before spending two and a half years preaching from a motor launch on the Murray River between Swan Reach and Loxton. He then left missionary work because of doctrinal differences, did not enter the ministry, and instead opened a store at Alberton until his election to parliament. He married Florence Ethel Hobbs on 9 October 1912. He was publicly involved in the campaign against conscription during World War I, and unsuccessfully contested the 1918 state election in the electorate of Barossa, narrowly losing to Sir Richard Butler. Gabb was a strict teetotaller.

== Federal politics ==
In 1919, he was elected to the Australian House of Representatives as the Labor member for Angas, defeating long-serving Nationalist MP and Minister for Home and Territories Paddy Glynn. He drew public attention in 1920 when he refused to accept a salary increase from £600 to £1,000. He was known for often calling quorum when the amount of MPs in the parliamentary chamber was low, believing that its strict application forced MPs to do their elected duties. He was re-elected at the 1922 election, defeating George Ritchie, who had resigned as state Treasurer to challenge Gabb. Gabb was defeated by Nationalist candidate Walter Parsons in 1925, but defeated Parsons in 1929 to regain the seat.

In 1931, he joined Joseph Lyons and several other members in leaving the Labor Party in the 1931 Labor split and supported a no-confidence motion in Labor Prime Minister James Scullin; Gabb stated that he believed Scullin was a "sincere man", but strongly disapproved of Treasurer Ted Theodore. Unlike his colleagues, did not join the new United Australia Party and instead remained in parliament as an independent. In the same year, the Sydney Morning Herald described Gabb as being an "unexciting speaker" and "a sort of inverted alchemist afflicted with an ambition for turning gold into lead." He responded to criticism for wasting parliamentary time with quorum calls in May by stating "if the economy were really considered this show [parliament] would be shut down" and "close it and let me act as Mussolini and I will run things in a better way!"

He was re-elected as an independent with the support of the Emergency Committee of South Australia at the 1931 federal election. In 1932, he moved a bill to reduce parliamentary salaries to £600, which while opposed by the vast majority of MPs, caused Minister for Commerce Charles Hawker to resign from the ministry in order to vote for the bill. Gabb's seat of Angas was abolished in a redistribution prior to the 1934 election, at which he retired.

== Later life and death ==
After losing his seat in 1925, he was secretary of the South Australian branch of the Federated Gas Employees' Industrial Union until he regained the seat in 1929. He contested the 1938 state election as an independent, nominating against Premier Richard Layton Butler in his seat of Light, but was unsuccessful. Gabb rarely listened to radio coverage of politics in later years because he felt broadcasting was bringing Parliament into disrepute. He remained publicly critical of parliamentary salary increases in later life, accusing politicians of "feathering their nests". He killed himself at his Rosewater home in 1951, and was cremated.

Parliament of Australia
Preceded by Paddy Glynn	Member for Angas; 1919–1925	Succeeded by Walter Parsons
Preceded by Walter Parsons	Member for Angas; 1929–1934	Division abolished
