= Edward Vardon =

Australian politician

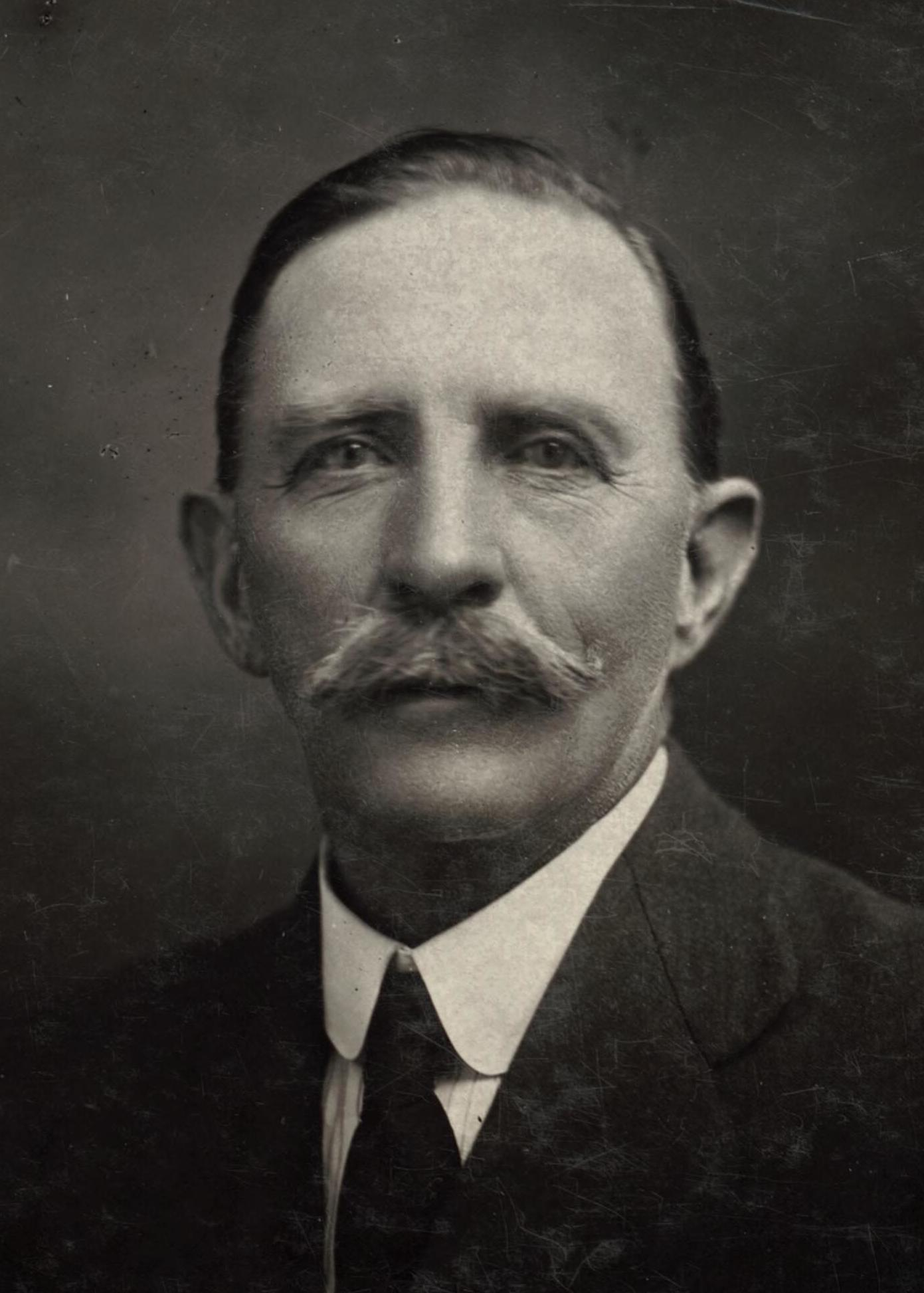

Senator for South Australia
- In office 16 February 1921 – 4 August 1921
- Preceded by: Robert Guthrie
- Succeeded by: Appointment lapsed
- In office 9 August 1921 – 15 December 1922
- Preceded by: Re-appointed
- Succeeded by: Bert Hoare

Personal details
- Born: 10 November 1866 Hindmarsh, South Australia
- Died: 23 February 1937 (aged 70) Unley Park, South Australia
- Party: Liberal Union (to 1923); Liberal Federation (1923–1932); LCL (from 1932)
- Other political affiliations: Nationalist (federal parliamentary)
- Spouse: Ellen Peel (m. 1888; died 1927)
- Relations: Joseph Vardon (father)
- Occupation: Businessman

Edward Charles Vardon (10 November 1866 – 23 February 1937) was an Australian businessman and politician. He served briefly as a Senator for South Australia (1921–1922) and was a member of the South Australian House of Assembly (1918–1921, 1924–1930) before and after his service in federal parliament.

== Early life ==
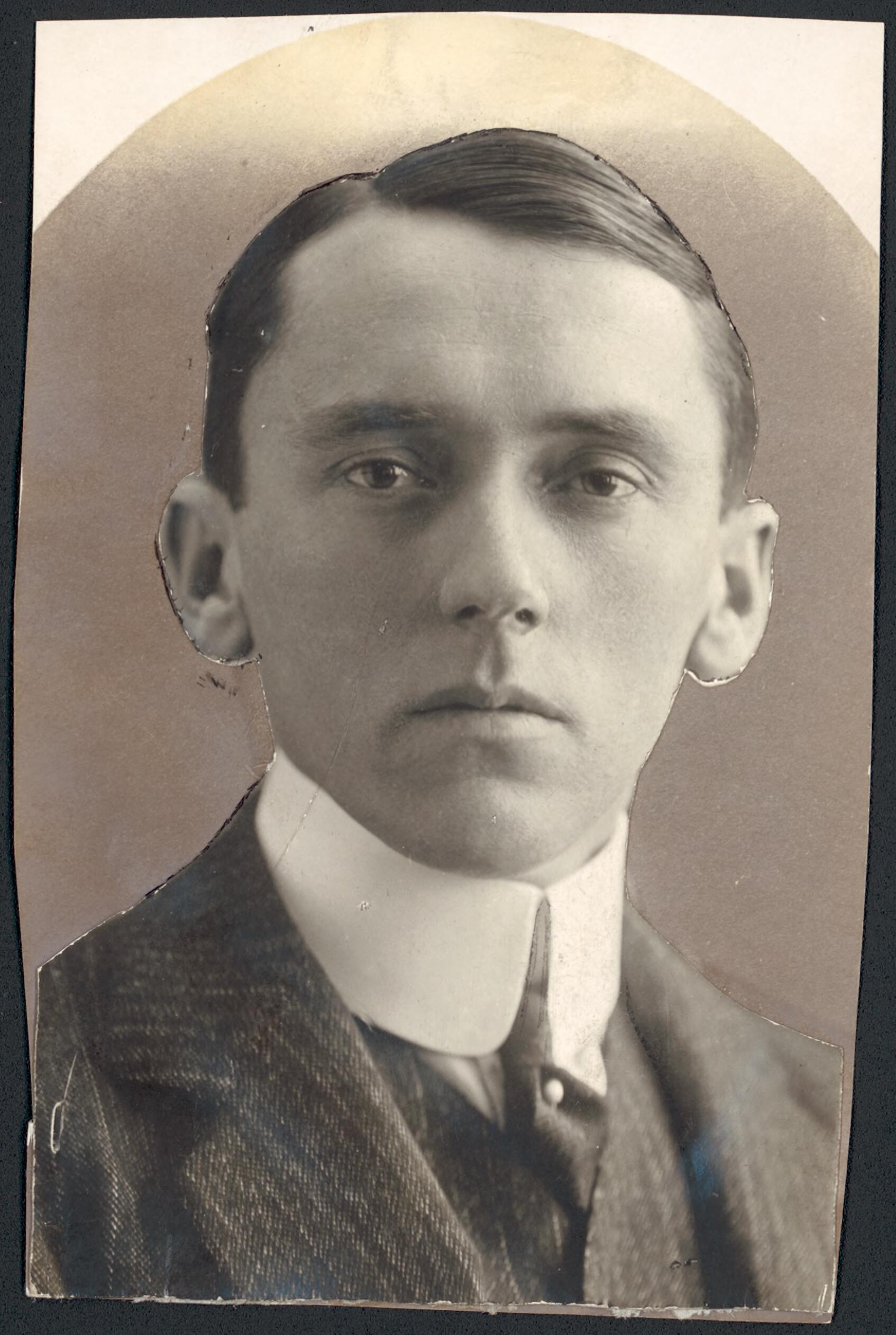
Vardon as a young man

Vardon was born on 10 November 1866 in Hindmarsh, South Australia. He was one of five children born to Mary Ann (née Pickering) and Joseph Vardon, a printer. He was educated at North Adelaide Grammar School, leaving to work in his father's business and eventually becoming a director of Vardon and Sons. His father was active in public affairs and held elective office at all three levels of government.

Outside of the family business, Vardon also served as chairman of Mile End Cold Stores, the Adelaide Fruit and Produce Exchange Company, and the East End Markets on East Terrace. He was president of the South Australian Chamber of Manufactures from 1910 to 1912.

== State politics ==
Vardon was elected to the South Australian House of Assembly at the 1918 state election, standing as a Liberal on a joint ticket with two Nationalists. He stood on a platform which included opposition to tax increases, reducing the number of state MPs, introducing proportional representation, greater education spending, and the introduction of scripture classes in state schools.

In parliament, Vardon's areas of interest included "federal and state taxation systems, industrial law and the minutiae of government expenditure". In 1918, several months after his election, he successfully introduced an amendment to the government's marriage legislation. His amendment provided for gender equality in at-fault divorce, allowing women to file for divorce on the grounds of adultery where previously only men had been able to do so.

== Federal politics ==
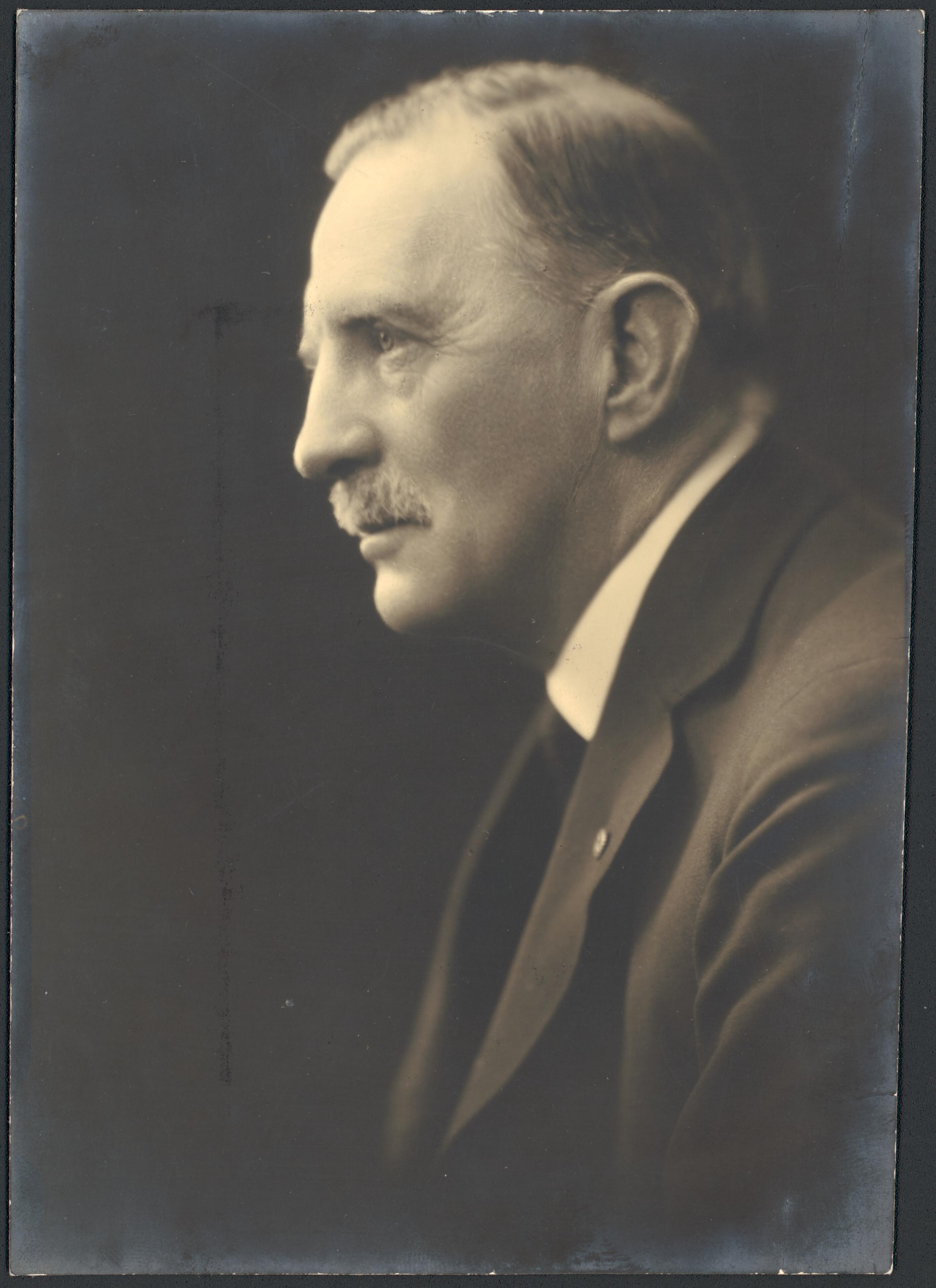
Edward Vardon

On 18 February 1921, Vardon was appointed to the Senate to fill a casual vacancy caused by the death of Robert Guthrie. His term expired on 4 August due to the Parliament of South Australia's failure to confirm his appointment, but this was rectified five days later. He had earlier been selected by the Liberal Union for its Senate ticket prior to the 1917 federal election, but withdrew in favour of James Rowell.

According to his biographer Ann Millar, Vardon's speeches in the Senate put forward "the considered views of a thoughtful backbencher committed to government accountability, even when the government was controlled by his own party". He and his father are one of only two father-son pairs to both serve as senators, along with James and Allan Guy. Vardon continued his support of proportional representation and also supported parliamentary representation for the Northern Territory. He was an economic protectionist and supported reduced government spending, seeking to reduce the size of the Commonwealth Public Service and describing the construction of Canberra as "unnecessary".

In April 1922, Vardon was selected as one of the Liberal Union's three Senate candidates for the next federal election, along with James Rowell and Alexander McLachlan. Unlike at the previous two elections, the Liberal Union and National Party were unable to come to an arrangement for a joint ticket, with the former standing as "true blue" Liberals opposed to Prime Minister Billy Hughes. He and the rest of the ticket were defeated.

== Return to state politics and later life ==
In 1923, Vardon was appointed to the Apprenctices' Advisory Board as the representative of the Chamber of Manufactures. He was re-elected to the House of Assembly at the 1924 state election, winning his old seat of Sturt for the Liberal Federation.

Vardon was defeated at the 1930 election, but in 1932 attempted to gain preselection in Sturt for the new Liberal and Country League.

== Personal life ==
Vardon married Ellen Peel in 1888, with whom he had a son and a daughter. His wife's sister married David Gordon. He was widowed in 1927 and was also predeceased by his son. He died at his home in Unley Park on 23 February 1937, aged 70, having been ill since August 1936 and suffered bouts of ill health since 1928.
