= Clement Smith (Australian politician) =

Australian politician (1894–1968)

Clement James Drummond Smith (26 July 1894 – 7 June 1968) was an Australian politician who represented the South Australian House of Assembly seat of Victoria from 1938 to 1941 as an independent.

He was one of 14 of 39 lower house MPs at the 1938 election to be elected as an independent, which as a grouping won 40 percent of the primary vote, more than either of the major parties. Tom Stott was the de facto leader of the independent caucus within parliament.

Parliament of South Australia
Preceded by Ronald Hunt; Vernon Petherick	Member for Victoria; 1938–1941	Succeeded by Vernon Petherick
