= Electoral district of Sturt (South Australia) =

Former state electoral district of South Australia

Coordinates: 34°57′S 138°36′E

Sturt South Australia—House of Assembly
- State: South Australia
- Dates current: 1857–1902, 1915–1938
- Namesake: Charles Sturt
- Demographic: Metropolitan

Sturt (The Sturt until 1875) was an electoral district of the House of Assembly in the Australian state of South Australia. It was named after the explorer Charles Sturt.

Sturt was one of the initial districts in the first parliament. It was initially centred on Unley, but later broadened to include all or part of Belair, Brighton, Glenelg, Goodwood, Hyde Park, Mitcham, Parkside and Sturt. When recreated in 1915, it also included Hawthorn and Wayville.

== Members ==
First incarnation (1857–1902)
Member	Party	Term	Member	Party	Term
John Hallett		1857–1862	Thomas Reynolds		1857–1860
John Hallett		1857–1862	Joseph Peacock		1860–1867
R. B. Andrews		1862–1870	Joseph Peacock		1860–1867
R. B. Andrews		1862–1870	Alexander Murray		1867–1868
R. B. Andrews		1862–1870	Joseph Fisher		1868–1870
Frederick Spicer		1870–1870	Joseph Fisher		1868–1870
William Townsend		1870–1882	John Lindsay		1870–1871
William Townsend		1870–1882	J. H. Barrow		1871–1874
William Townsend		1870–1882	William Mair		1874–1875
William Townsend		1870–1882	S. J. Way		1875–1876
William Townsend		1870–1882	Thomas King		1876–1881
William Townsend		1870–1882	Josiah Symon		1881–1887
Thomas King		1882–1885	Josiah Symon		1881–1887
S. G. Glyde		1885–1887	Josiah Symon		1881–1887
W. F. Stock		1887–1893	John Jenkins		1887–1902
Thomas Price	Labor	1893–1902	John Jenkins		1887–1902

Second incarnation (1915–1938)
Member	Party	Term	Member	Party	Term	Member	Party	Term
Crawford Vaughan	Labor	1915–1917	T. H. Smeaton	Labor	1915–1917	Thomas Ryan	Labor	1915–1917
Crawford Vaughan	National	1917–1918	T. H. Smeaton	National	1917–1921	Thomas Ryan	National	1917–1917
Crawford Vaughan	Independent	1918–1918	T. H. Smeaton	National	1917–1921	Thomas Ryan	National	1917–1917
Arthur Blackburn	National	1918–1921	T. H. Smeaton	National	1917–1921	Edward Vardon	Liberal Union	1918–1921
Herbert Richards	Liberal Union	1921–1923	George Hussey	Liberal Union	1921–1923	Ernest Anthoney	Liberal Union	1921–1923
Herbert Richards	Liberal Federation	1923–1930	George Hussey	Liberal Federation	1923–1924	Ernest Anthoney	Liberal Federation	1923–1938
Herbert Richards	Liberal Federation	1923–1930	Edward Vardon	Liberal Federation	1924–1930	Ernest Anthoney	Liberal Federation	1923–1938
Bob Dale	Labor	1930–1931	Edgar Dawes	Labor	1930–1933	Ernest Anthoney	Liberal Federation	1923–1938
Bob Dale	Lang Labor	1931–1933	Edgar Dawes	Labor	1930–1933	Ernest Anthoney	Liberal Federation	1923–1938
Bob Dale	Lang Labor	1931–1933	Edgar Dawes	Labor	1930–1933	Ernest Anthoney	Liberal and Country	1932–1938
Henry Dunks	Liberal and Country	1933–1938	Horace Hogben	Liberal and Country	1933–1938	Ernest Anthoney	Liberal and Country	1932–1938
