= Roy McLachlan =

Australian politician

Member of the South Australian House of Assembly for Victoria
- In office 1947–1953
- Preceded by: Jim Corcoran
- Succeeded by: Jim Corcoran

Personal details
- Born: December 24, 1901 Australia
- Died: April 17, 1973
- Party: Liberal and Country League
- Relations: James McLachlan (father)

Roy McLachlan (24 December 1901 – 17 April 1973) was an Australian politician who represented the South Australian House of Assembly seat of Victoria from 1947 to 1953 for the Liberal and Country League.

His father James McLachlan was a federal senator from 1935 to 1947.

Parliament of South Australia
Preceded by Jim Corcoran	Member for Victoria; 1947–1953	Succeeded by Jim Corcoran
