= Vernon Petherick =

Australian politician

Vernon Gordon Petherick (20 April 1876 – 14 August 1945) was an Australian politician who represented the South Australian House of Assembly seat of Victoria from 1918 to 1924, 1932 to 1938 and 1941 to 1945 for the Liberal Union, Liberal Federation and Liberal and Country League.

== See also ==
- Hundred of Petherick

Parliament of South Australia
Preceded by Clarence Goode	Member for Victoria; 1918–1924; Served alongside: Peter Reidy	Succeeded by Eric Shepherd
Preceded by Peter Reidy	Member for Victoria; 1932–1938; Served alongside: Eric Shepherd, Ronald Hunt	Succeeded by Clement Smith
Preceded by Clement Smith	Member for Victoria; 1941–1945	Succeeded by Jim Corcoran
