= Horace Hogben =

Australian politician

Horace Cox Hogben (20 September 1888 – 18 December 1975) was an Australian politician who represented the South Australian House of Assembly multi-member seat of Sturt from 1933 to 1938 for the Liberal and Country League.

Hogben was born at Magill and was educated at Magill and Port Pirie state schools, the Adelaide School of Mines and the University of Adelaide. He was hired as a junior with BHP in Port Pirie from 1905 to 1907, then as a clerk for David J. Fowler from 1907 to 1917, as company secretary for E. and W. Hackett Limited from 1977 to 1922, and as accountant and office manager for Cowell Brothers and Co. Ltd from 1922 to 1930. He was a public accountant and auditor from 1930. Hogben was the honorary secretary of the Young Liberal League from 1930 and the honorary treasurer of the Emergency Committee of South Australia in 1931. He also served as president of the Adelaide Benevolent and Strangers Friendly Society, a trustee of the Savings Bank of South Australia, deputy chairman of the South Australian Housing Trust and a board member of the Co-operative Building Society.

Hogben was elected to the House of Assembly in the LCL landslide at the 1933 election in the seat of Sturt. Following an electoral redistribution due to the abolition of multi-member seats, he contested the seat of Unley at the 1938 election, but was defeated.

He married Clara Margaret Marion McPharlin; they had one son and one daughter.
