= Bob Dale (politician) =

Australian politician (1875–1953)

Robert Alexander Dale (19 August 1875 – 22 February 1953) was an Australian politician who represented the South Australian House of Assembly seat of Sturt from 1930 to 1933 and Adelaide from 1933 to 1938 and 1944 to 1947 for the Labor Party.

He worked from a very early age as a sheep shearer at "Andamoka" and "practically every station in the State", when he was known as one of the best blade shearers and a member of the Shearers' Union (later AWU).

He later worked underground in the Broken Hill mines, then at the smelters. When the smelters moved to Port Pirie in 1898 he settled in that city. He married in 1902, and their six children attended Solomontown school.

He was a dedicated unionist, and a member of the Amalgamated Mining Union organised by Tom Mann. The union went on strike in 1909 after management at the smelters reduced their pay from 8/3d per day to 7/3d, and was not called off until six months later, when Mr. Justice Higgins ordered a return to work at 8/3d. Dale had kept his family fed and clothed by trapping rabbits.

== Personal ==
Known as "Curley" Dale, Bob married Alice Ada Maud Harris (died 1963) in 1902 and had six children:

- William Thomas "Will" Dale (1902– )
- Freda Gladys Evelyn Dale (1904– )
- Vera May Dale (1905– )
- Lily Lavina Dale (1908– )
- Muriel Olive Linda Dale (1909– )
- Doris Maretta Dale (1910– )

All married and lived in Adelaide

South Australian House of Assembly
Preceded by Herbert Richards	Member for Sturt; 1930–1933; Served alongside: Edgar Dawes, Ernest Anthoney	Succeeded by Henry Dunks
Preceded by Herbert George	Member for Adelaide; 1933–1938; Served alongside: Bill Denny, Bert Edwards, Martin Collaton	Succeeded by Doug Bardolph
Preceded by Doug Bardolph	Member for Adelaide; 1944–1947	Succeeded by Herbert George
