= Walter Parsons (politician) =

Australian politician

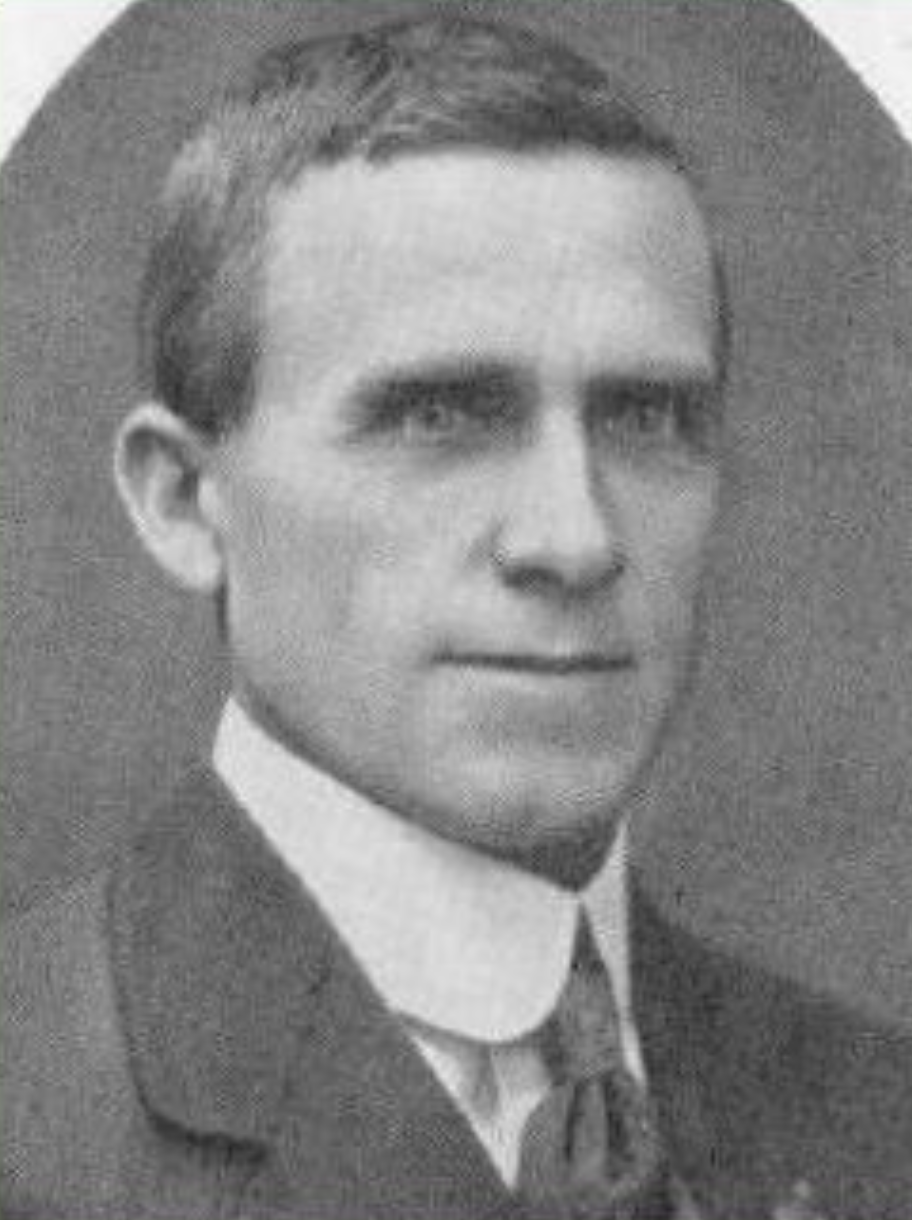

Member of the Australian Parliament for Angas
- In office 14 November 1925 – 12 October 1929
- Preceded by: Moses Gabb
- Succeeded by: Moses Gabb

Personal details
- Born: 16 August 1881 Adelaide, South Australia
- Died: 2 March 1955 (aged 73)
- Party: Nationalist Party of Australia
- Occupation: Shopkeeper

Walter Langdon Parsons (16 August 1881 – 2 March 1955) was an Australian politician.

Parsons was born at North Adelaide, the son of politician John Langdon Parsons and half-brother of Herbert Angas Parsons. He was educated at Queen's School, Angaston Public School and Whinham College. He worked for D & W Murray Limited from 1898, and in 1906 became a storekeeper in Gladstone, operating the Gladstone branch of F. C. Catt Specialty Stores. He renamed the store the W. L. Parsons Stores in 1912. In local government, Parsons was mayor of the Corporate Town of Gladstone from 1914 to 1916. He attempted to enlist for World War I service on 1 November 1918, but was deferred at the recruiting depot.

Parsons sold his Gladstone stores in 1919 and became a citrus grower at Paradise. In January 1922, he bought E. J. Woodroffe's store in Kadina, and operated it as W. Parsons & Co. until closing the business in December 1925 upon his election to parliament. He moved to Haldon Gardens (now in Kensington Park) by 1925, and served as a District Council of Burnside councillor for the Kensington Park Ward. Parsons was also a lay reader of the Anglican Church for over 20 years, a member of the standing committees of the Willochra and later Adelaide dioceses, and a vice-president of the Demobilised Soldiers' Association.

In 1925, he was elected to the Australian House of Representatives as the Nationalist member for Angas, defeating sitting Labor MP Moses Gabb. He held the seat until his defeat by Gabb in 1929, whereupon he became an insurance agent. Parsons died in 1955.

Civic offices
Preceded by J. Eley	Mayor of Gladstone (SA); 1914–1916	Succeeded by F. C. Grubb
Parliament of Australia
Preceded by Moses Gabb	Member for Angas; 1925 – 1929	Succeeded by Moses Gabb
