= Fred Walsh =

Australian politician (1893–1968)

John Frederick (Fred) Walsh (21 April 1893 – 29 April 1968) was an Australian politician who represented the South Australian House of Assembly seats of Thebarton from 1942 to 1956 and West Torrens from 1956 to 1965 for the Labor Party.

Parliament of South Australia
Preceded by Jules Langdon	Member for Thebarton; 1942–1956	Seat abolished
New seat	Member for West Torrens; 1956–1965	Succeeded by Glen Broomhill
