= Henry Dunks =

Australian politician

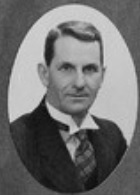

Henry Stephen Dunks (7 June 1882 – 22 March 1955) was an Australian politician. He was a Liberal and Country League member of the South Australian House of Assembly from 1933 to 1955, representing Sturt until 1938 and Mitcham thereafter.

South Australian House of Assembly
Preceded by Bob Dale	Member for Sturt; 1933–1938; With: Horace Hogben; Ernest Anthoney	District abolished
New district	Member for Mitcham; 1938–1955	Succeeded by Robin Millhouse
