= Electoral district of Thebarton =

Former South Australian state electoral district

Thebarton South Australia—House of Assembly
- State: South Australia
- Created: 1938
- Abolished: 1956
- Namesake: Thebarton, South Australia
- Demographic: Metropolitan
- Coordinates: 34°54′S 138°34′E

Thebarton was an electoral district of the House of Assembly in the Australian state of South Australia from 1938 to 1956. It was abolished and replaced by the seat of West Torrens for the 1956 election.

== Members ==
Member	Party	Term
Jules Langdon	Independent	1938–1942
Fred Walsh	Labor	1942–1956
