= Frank Walsh =

Australian politician (1897–1968)

The Honourable Frank Walsh
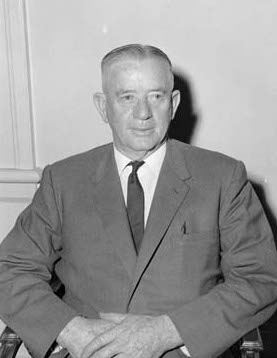
- Walsh in 1963

Premier of South Australia
- In office 6 March 1965 – 1 June 1967
- Monarch: Elizabeth II
- Governor: Sir Edric Bastyan
- Preceded by: Sir Thomas Playford IV
- Succeeded by: Don Dunstan

Leader of the Opposition in South Australia
- In office 5 October 1960 – 6 March 1965
- Preceded by: Mick O'Halloran
- Succeeded by: Sir Thomas Playford IV

Leader of the South Australian Labor Party
- In office 5 October 1960 – 1 June 1967; Acting:22 September – 5 October 1960
- Deputy: Cyril Hutchens
- Preceded by: Mick O'Halloran
- Succeeded by: Don Dunstan

Deputy Leader of the South Australian Labor Party
- In office 27 October 1949 – 5 October 1960
- Leader: Mick O'Halloran
- Preceded by: Mick O'Halloran
- Succeeded by: Cyril Hutchens

Minister of Social Welfare
- In office 1 June 1967 – 26 March 1968
- Preceded by: Don Dunstan
- Succeeded by: Hugh Hudson

Treasurer of South Australia
- In office 10 March 1965 – 1 June 1967
- Preceded by: Sir Thomas Playford IV
- Succeeded by: Don Dunstan

Member of the South Australian Parliament for Edwardstown Goodwood (1941–1956)
- In office 29 March 1941 – 2 March 1968
- Preceded by: George Illingworth
- Succeeded by: Geoff Virgo

Personal details
- Born: Francis Henry Walsh; 6 July 1897 O'Halloran Hill, South Australia, Australia
- Died: 18 May 1968 (aged 70) Parkside, South Australia, Australia
- Party: Australian Labor Party (SA)

Francis Henry Walsh (6 July 1897 – 18 May 1968) was an Australian politician who was the 34th Premier of South Australia from 1965 to 1967, representing the South Australian Branch of the Australian Labor Party.

== Early life ==
One of eight children, Walsh was born into an Irish Catholic family in O'Halloran Hill, South Australia. After an education at Christian Brothers College, Walsh left school at fifteen to work as a stonemason, which sparked his interest in the trade union movement. Walsh would serve as President of the South Australian Stonemason's Society and the national stonemason body and as a member of the United Trades and Labour Council of South Australia, while still finding the time to continue working as a stonemason and marry on 29 December 1925.

== Parliament ==
At the 1938 state election, Walsh first stood for Labor in the safe conservative electorate of Mitcham and while losing to the Liberal and Country League (LCL) member, impressed senior ALP figures sufficiently to gain endorsement for the safe Labor seat of Goodwood (replaced by Edwardstown in 1956). Walsh duly entered parliament in March 1941. When longtime Opposition Leader Robert Richards retired in 1949, his deputy, Mick O'Halloran, ascended as leader. Walsh was elected as his deputy when it became clear no one else wanted the job. Labor had by then been in opposition in South Australia since 1933. The LCL, led by Sir Thomas Playford, ruled South Australia through a time of strong economic development and held power thanks to an electoral malapportionment known as the Playmander, in which rural areas were significantly overrepresented in the legislature. By this time, many South Australian Labor politicians had despaired of ever winning power, and considered the Deputy Opposition Leader's post to be a thankless, low-paying job.

Following the split in the Labor Party in 1955, Walsh and O'Halloran resisted numerous overtures to join the heavily Catholic Democratic Labor Party (DLP). Their opposition ensured that the DLP did not attain the same influence in South Australian politics that it did in Victoria and Queensland.

Following the sudden death of O'Halloran in 1960, Walsh was narrowly elected to the Labor leadership ahead of Don Dunstan. He followed O'Halloran's lead of preferring co-operation with the LCL to criticizing them and maintained friendly relations with Playford, who treated him in a somewhat avuncular manner. However, Walsh made a concerted effort to end the LCL's three-decade grip on power. Knowing that the Playmander made a traditional statewide campaign impossible, he decided to focus on targeting the LCL's marginal seats.

Walsh fought his first election as state Labor leader in 1962. Labor won decisively on the two-party vote, taking 54 percent of the vote. In nearly every other area of Australia, this would have been enough for a comprehensive Labor victory. However, due to the Playmander, Labor won 19 seats, two short of a majority. The balance of power rested with two independents, who threw their support behind Playford a week after the election. Walsh lobbied the Governor, Sir Edric Bastyan, to appoint him Premier instead, arguing that he had won a clear majority of the popular vote. It was to no avail. Nonetheless, the election showed just how distorted the Playmander had become. Even though Adelaide accounted for two-thirds of the state's population, a country's vote was worth anywhere from two to 10 times a vote in Adelaide.

== Premier ==
Labor finally overcame the Playmander in the 1965 election, taking 55 percent of the primary vote. However, the Playmander was strong enough that Labor only netted 21 seats to the LCL's 18, for a paper-thin majority of two seats. In nearly every other state, Labor's margin would have been enough for a landslide majority government. Walsh at 69 years and 330 days of age thus became the oldest person to be appointed Premier, as well as the first Labor Premier of South Australia in 32 years, as well as the first Catholic to hold the post. He also served as his own Treasurer and Minister for Immigration.

Walsh found himself the head of an inexperienced government, No current Labor parliamentarian had been in office during Labor's last term in government, let alone served as a minister. This left him no choice but to entrust sensitive portfolios to men more used to criticizing the LCL. His term as Premier was marked by increased spending on public education and the implementation of far-reaching social welfare and Aboriginal Affairs legislation, although many of these changes were spearheaded by his deputy and Attorney-General, Dunstan, by far the youngest member of the cabinet (he was the only minister under 50, and one of only three under 60). The socially conservative Walsh may well have personally opposed some of these reforms. Indeed, it was no secret that he resented and distrusted Dunstan; his closest confidant was Irrigation Minister Des Corcoran. Nonetheless, he felt compelled to go along.

Walsh was never comfortable dealing with the media, particularly television, and his ascension as Premier only exacerbated these problems. Even before 1965, he was notorious for using complex words in the wrong context, and his speeches were often peppered with malapropisms. Walsh regularly had journalists, Hansard reporters, and political ally and foe alike bewildered by his statements. To give but one example, Walsh once said in parliament "In this manner, Mr Speaker, the government has acted as if this were a diseased estate. It's not sufficiently elasticated... The government is suffering from a complete lack of apathy in the case." His unease with the media was seen in stark contrast to Dunstan, who would prove to be a media relations master throughout his later terms as Premier.

Walsh's awkwardness with the media was further highlighted after 1966, the year Playford retired as leader of the LCL and the 37-year-old Steele Hall took his place. Hall's youth stood in sharp contrast to Walsh, and he was far more progressive than Playford had been. Combined with a sagging economy and poor polling figures, local ALP heavyweights concluded that Labor could not be reelected with Walsh as Premier. In any event, Walsh would not have been able to stand in the next election; Labor rules of the time required MPs to retire at the age of 67. Additionally, in the 1966 federal election, Labor suffered an 11.8 percent swing against it in South Australia. Had this been repeated at a state election, Labor could have been reduced to as few as 10 seats. Knowing that they had, at most, two years before the next election, SA Labor heavyweights concluded they had to move fast in order to change their fortunes.

Things came to a head in January 1967, when federal Labor power-broker Clyde Cameron publicly thanked Walsh for making the noble decision to retire to make way for a younger person. This was news to Walsh, who had made no such decision. After initially digging in his heels, Walsh eventually announced his retirement two weeks later, but not before attempting to manoeuvre Corcoran into the Premiership ahead of Dunstan. However, this was not enough to prevent Dunstan from being elected as Labor leader, and hence Premier, by three votes.

Walsh died less than two months after he left parliament at the 1968 election, and was given a state funeral. Considered "kindly, generous and unpretentious" by friend and foe, Walsh was praised for his long parliamentary service and his support for unionism and working-class families, but he would frequently infuriate fellow party members by habitually becoming obsessed with trivial issues to the detriment of major policy concerns.

== Notes ==
Political offices
Preceded by Mick O'Halloran	Leader of the Opposition of South Australia; 1960–1965	Succeeded by Thomas Playford IV
Preceded by Thomas Playford IV	Premier of South Australia; 1965–1967	Succeeded by Don Dunstan
Preceded by Thomas Playford IV	Treasurer of South Australia; 1965–1967	Succeeded by Don Dunstan
Parliament of South Australia
Preceded by George Illingworth	Member for Goodwood; 1941–1956	Seat abolished
New creation	Member for Edwardstown; 1956–1968	Succeeded by Geoff Virgo
Party political offices
Preceded by Mick O'Halloran	Leader of the Australian Labor Party (South Australian Branch); 1960–1967	Succeeded by Don Dunstan
