= Electoral district of Goodwood =

Former South Australian state electoral district

Coordinates: 34°58′48″S 138°34′16″E

Goodwood South Australia—House of Assembly
- State: South Australia
- Created: 1938
- Abolished: 1956
- Namesake: Goodwood, South Australia
- Demographic: Metropolitan

Goodwood was an electoral district of the House of Assembly in the Australian state of South Australia from 1938 to 1956.

Goodwood was abolished in a boundary redistribution in 1956, mostly replaced by the Electoral district of Edwardstown.

The suburb of Goodwood is currently divided between the seats of Ashford and Unley.

== Members ==
Member	Party	Term
George Illingworth	Independent	1938–1941
Frank Walsh	Labor	1941–1956

Walsh went to represent the Electoral district of Edwardstown from March 1956.
