= 1938 South Australian state election =

- 19 March 1938

All 39 seats in the South Australian House of Assembly 20 seats were needed for a majority
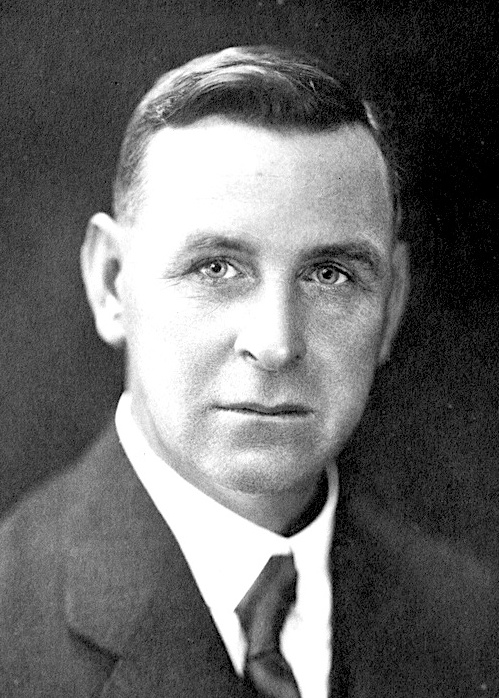

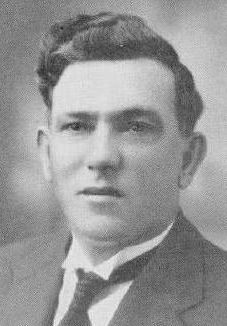
	First party	Second party
Leader	Richard L. Butler	Andrew Lacey
Party	Liberal and Country League	Labor
Leader since	7 December 1925	22 April 1933
Leader's seat	Wooroora	Port Pirie
Last election	29 seats	6 seats
Seats won	15 seats	9 seats
Seat change	▼14	▲3
Percentage	33.44%	26.16%
Swing	▼1.18	▼1.61
Premier before election
Richard L. Butler
Liberal and Country League
Elected Premier
Richard L. Butler
Liberal and Country League

State elections were held in South Australia on 19 March 1938. All 39 seats in the South Australian House of Assembly were up for election. The incumbent Liberal and Country League government led by Premier of South Australia Richard L. Butler defeated the opposition Australian Labor Party led by Leader of the Opposition Andrew Lacey.

== Background ==
This election was the start of the electoral malapportionment which became known as the Playmander. It consisted of rural districts enjoying a 2-to-1 advantage in the state parliament, even though they contained less than half of the population, as well as a change from multi-member to single-member electorates, and the number of MPs in the lower house was reduced from 46 to 39. Labor remained out of power until the 1965 election.

Tom Stott was one of 14 of 39 lower house MPs to be elected as an independent, which as a grouping won 40 percent of the primary vote, more than either of the major parties. Stott was the de facto leader of the independent caucus within parliament. The incumbent Butler LCL minority government only won 15 of 39 seats, which led to uncertainty over which party, if any, could form government. This confusion led Stott, as the most experienced and well known of the independent MPs, to believe that he could become Premier of South Australia. He failed to gain the support of sufficient independents and LCL members to achieve this but, as the de facto leader of the independent caucus within parliament, the LCL government were often forced to rely on his support.

== Results ==
Arrangement of the House of Assembly after the 1938 state election.

South Australian state election, 19 March 1938 House of Assembly << 1933–1941 >>
Enrolled voters	364,884				
Votes cast	233,136		Turnout	63.31%	+3.86%
Informal votes	14,811		Informal	2.16%	-2.71%
Summary of votes by party
Party	Primary votes	%	Swing	Seats	Change
Liberal and Country	72,998	33.44%	–1.18%	15	– 14
Labor	57,124	26.16%	–1.61%	9	+ 3
Single Tax League	1,451	0.66%	–2.46%	1	± 0
Independent	74,412	34.08%	+20.67%	12	+ 9
Independent Labor	12,340	5.65%	*	2	+ 2
Total	218,325			39	

== See also ==
- Results of the South Australian state election, 1938 (House of Assembly)
- Candidates of the South Australian state election, 1938
- Members of the South Australian House of Assembly, 1938-1941
- Members of the South Australian Legislative Council, 1938–1941
- Playmander
