= Electoral results for the district of Newland =

South Australian district election results

This is a list of electoral results for the Electoral district of Newland in South Australian state elections.

== Members for Newland ==
Member	Party	Term
John Klunder	Labor	1977–1979
Brian Billard	Liberal	1979–1982
John Klunder	Labor	1982–1985
Di Gayler	Labor	1985–1989
Dorothy Kotz	Liberal	1989–2006
Tom Kenyon	Labor	2006–2018
Richard Harvey	Liberal	2018–2022
Olivia Savvas	Labor	2022–present

== Election results ==
=== Elections in the 2020s ===
==== 2026 ====
2026 South Australian state election: Newland
Party	Candidate	Votes	%	±%
Labor	Olivia Savvas	11,348	46.2	+9.3
One Nation	Alison Dew-Fennell	6,088	24.8	+21.0
Liberal	Sarai Birch	3,789	15.4	−19.2
Greens	Helen Wright	2,118	8.6	+2.8
Family First	Rachel Mathew	658	2.7	−0.9
Australian Family	Colin Stanford	211	0.9	−0.1
United Voice	Abe Lazootin	206	0.8	+0.8
Fair Go	Hayley Marley-Duncan	136	0.6	+0.6
Total formal votes		24,554	96.9	+1.3
Informal votes		785	3.1	−1.3
Turnout		25,339	93.8	+2.9
Two-candidate-preferred result
Labor	Olivia Savvas	14,221	60.3	+4.9
One Nation	Alison Dew-Fennell	9,382	39.7	+39.7
Labor hold				

==== 2022 ====
2022 South Australian state election: Newland
Party	Candidate	Votes	%	±%
Labor	Olivia Savvas	8,599	36.9	+3.7
Liberal	Richard Harvey	8,076	34.6	+0.5
Independent	Frances Bedford	2,861	12.3	+6.8
Greens	Adla Mattiske	1,344	5.8	+0.2
One Nation	Hayley Marley-Duncan	885	3.8	+3.8
Family First	Brett Green	844	3.6	+3.6
Animal Justice	David Sherlock	351	1.5	+1.0
Australian Family	Dan Casey	225	1.0	+1.0
Real Change	Kate Simpson	147	0.6	+0.6
Total formal votes		23,332	95.6	
Informal votes		1,076	4.4	
Turnout		24,408	90.9	
Two-party-preferred result
Labor	Olivia Savvas	12,916	55.4	+5.4
Liberal	Richard Harvey	10,416	44.6	−5.4
Labor gain from Liberal		Swing	+5.4	

Distribution of preferences: Newland
Party	Candidate	Votes	Round 1		Round 2		Round 3		Round 4		Round 5		Round 6		Round 7	
Party	Candidate	Votes	Dist.	Total	Dist.	Total	Dist.	Total	Dist.	Total	Dist.	Total	Dist.	Total	Dist.	Total
Quota (50% + 1)		11,667														
Labor	Olivia Savvas	8,599	+13	8,612	+12	8,624	+55	8,679	+88	8,767	+518	9,285	+1,026	10,311	+2,605	12,916
Liberal	Richard Harvey	8,076	+6	8,082	+12	8,094	+48	8,142	+123	8,265	+351	8,616	+265	8,881	+1,535	10,416
Independent	Frances Bedford	2,861	+21	2,882	+28	2,910	+47	2,957	+276	3,233	+436	3,669	+471	4,140	Excluded	
Greens	Adla Mattiske	1,344	+27	1,371	+7	1,378	+138	1,516	+46	1,562	+200	1,762	Excluded			
One Nation	Hayley Marley-Duncan	885	+9	894	+47	941	+33	974	Excluded							
Family First	Brett Green	844	+29	873	+119	992	+72	1,064	+441	1,505	Excluded					
Animal Justice	David Sherlock	351	+36	387	+6	393	Excluded									
Australian Family	Dan Casey	225	+6	231	Excluded											
Real Change	Kate Simpson	147	Excluded													

=== Elections in the 2010s ===
==== 2018 ====
2018 South Australian state election: Newland
Party	Candidate	Votes	%	±%
Liberal	Richard Harvey	8,376	36.6	−6.6
Labor	Tom Kenyon	7,770	34.0	−7.1
SA-Best	Rajini Vasan	3,730	16.3	+16.3
Greens	Stephanie Stewart	1,274	5.6	−2.0
Conservatives	Martin Leedham	1,011	4.4	−3.8
Dignity	Sandra Williams	366	1.6	+1.6
Independent	Shane Bailey	354	1.5	+1.5
Total formal votes		22,881	95.6	−1.5
Informal votes		1,050	4.4	+1.5
Turnout		23,931	92.4	+1.0
Two-party-preferred result
Liberal	Richard Harvey	11,888	52.0	+1.8
Labor	Tom Kenyon	10,993	48.0	−1.8
Liberal hold		Swing	+1.8	

2014 South Australian state election: Newland
Party	Candidate	Votes	%	±%
Labor	Tom Kenyon	9,473	42.8	−0.5
Liberal	Glenn Docherty	9,269	41.8	+3.8
Family First	Kate Horan	1,774	8.0	+1.1
Greens	Mark Nolan	1,641	7.4	−0.6
Total formal votes		22,157	96.9	+0.4
Informal votes		700	3.1	−0.4
Turnout		22,857	93.4	−0.7
Two-party-preferred result
Labor	Tom Kenyon	11,394	51.4	−1.2
Liberal	Glenn Docherty	10,763	48.6	+1.2
Labor hold		Swing	−1.2	

2010 South Australian state election: Newland
Party	Candidate	Votes	%	±%
Labor	Tom Kenyon	8,886	42.8	−3.4
Liberal	Trish Draper	7,980	38.4	+4.3
Greens	Holden Ward	1,585	7.6	+2.2
Family First	Dale Clegg	1,308	6.3	−0.7
Save the RAH	Suren Krishnan	463	2.2	+2.2
Independent	Ryan Haby	377	1.8	+1.8
Fair Land Tax	Jim Zavros	183	0.9	+0.9
Total formal votes		21,357	93.4	+1.6
Informal votes		575	2.8	−1.6
Turnout		21,932	95.9	+2.1
Two-party-preferred result
Labor	Tom Kenyon	10,841	52.2	−4.6
Liberal	Trish Draper	9,941	47.8	+4.6
Labor hold		Swing	−4.6	

=== Elections in the 2000s ===
2006 South Australian state election: Newland
Party	Candidate	Votes	%	±%
Labor	Tom Kenyon	9,465	46.2	+11.2
Liberal	Mark Osterstock	6,995	34.1	−11.2
Family First	Brenda Bates	1,438	7.0	+0.1
Greens	Graham Smith	1,075	5.2	+5.2
Democrats	Ruth Russell	646	3.2	−7.1
No Rodeo	Troy Walker	316	1.5	+1.5
One Nation	Stan Batten	306	1.5	−0.9
Dignity for Disabled	Josephine Brooks	251	1.2	+1.2
Total formal votes		20,492	95.6	−2.0
Informal votes		947	4.4	+2.0
Turnout		21,439	93.8	−0.9
Two-party-preferred result
Labor	Tom Kenyon	11,639	56.8	+12.5
Liberal	Mark Osterstock	8,853	43.2	−12.5
Labor gain from Liberal		Swing	+12.5	

2002 South Australian state election: Newland
Party	Candidate	Votes	%	±%
Liberal	Dorothy Kotz	8,858	45.3	−1.3
Labor	Bernie Keane	6,842	35.0	+3.7
Democrats	Ruth Russell	2,020	10.3	−10.5
Family First	Steven Bakker	1,348	6.9	+6.9
One Nation	Hans Nas	474	2.4	+2.4
Total formal votes		19,542	97.6	
Informal votes		473	2.4	
Turnout		20,015	94.7	
Two-party-preferred result
Liberal	Dorothy Kotz	10,878	55.7	−1.3
Labor	Bernie Keane	8,664	44.3	+1.3
Liberal hold		Swing	−1.3	

=== Elections in the 1990s ===
1997 South Australian state election: Newland
Party	Candidate	Votes	%	±%
Liberal	Dorothy Kotz	9,268	47.5	−13.2
Labor	Michael Regan	6,009	30.8	+4.9
Democrats	Louise Armstrong-Quince	4,223	21.7	+11.6
Total formal votes		19,500	95.8	−1.7
Informal votes		852	4.2	+1.7
Turnout		20,352	93.1	
Two-party-preferred result
Liberal	Dorothy Kotz	11,305	58.0	−8.7
Labor	Michael Regan	8,195	42.0	+8.7
Liberal hold		Swing	−8.7	

1993 South Australian state election: Newland
Party	Candidate	Votes	%	±%
Liberal	Dorothy Kotz	12,256	61.3	+18.6
Labor	Lea Stevens	5,041	25.2	−19.6
Democrats	Kim Pedler	2,030	10.2	+1.9
Independent	Terence Boswell	658	3.3	+3.3
Total formal votes		19,985	97.4	−0.5
Informal votes		525	2.6	+0.5
Turnout		20,510	94.9	
Two-party-preferred result
Liberal	Dorothy Kotz	13,467	67.4	+17.8
Labor	Lea Stevens	6,518	32.6	−17.8
Liberal hold		Swing	+17.8	

- Newland was a notionally Labor held seat at the redistribution.

=== Elections in the 1980s ===
1989 South Australian state election: Newland
Party	Candidate	Votes	%	±%
Labor	Di Gayler	9,282	44.6	−4.5
Liberal	Dorothy Kotz	8,989	43.1	−3.3
Democrats	Patrick Kavanagh	1,628	7.8	+3.3
Call to Australia	Dennis Brown	930	4.5	+4.5
Total formal votes		20,829	97.8	+0.2
Informal votes		466	2.2	−0.2
Turnout		21,295	95.9	+0.9
Two-party-preferred result
Liberal	Dorothy Kotz	10,438	50.1	+1.6
Labor	Di Gayler	10,391	49.9	−1.6
Liberal gain from Labor		Swing	+1.6	

1985 South Australian state election: Newland
Party	Candidate	Votes	%	±%
Labor	Di Gayler	9,213	49.1	+3.1
Liberal	Scott Ashenden	8,708	46.4	−1.6
Democrats	Mike Bolt	851	4.5	−0.5
Total formal votes		18,772	97.6	
Informal votes		459	2.4	
Turnout		19,231	95.0	
Two-party-preferred result
Labor	Di Gayler	9,665	51.5	+2.5
Liberal	Scott Ashenden	9,107	48.5	−2.5
Labor hold		Swing	+2.5	

- Newland became a notional Liberal held seat in the redistribution.

1982 South Australian state election: Newland
Party	Candidate	Votes	%	±%
Labor	John Klunder	11,120	50.2	+11.9
Liberal	Brian Billard	9,555	43.1	−7.2
Democrats	Robert Mason	1,121	5.0	−6.4
National	Glen Stevens	372	1.7	+1.7
Total formal votes		22,168	95.6	0.0
Informal votes		1,011	4.4	0.0
Turnout		23,179	94.4	+0.6
Two-party-preferred result
Labor	John Klunder	11,871	53.6	+9.8
Liberal	Brian Billard	10,297	46.4	−9.8
Labor gain from Liberal		Swing	+9.8	

=== Elections in the 1970s ===
1979 South Australian state election: Newland
Party	Candidate	Votes	%	±%
Liberal	Brian Billard	9,661	50.3	+17.4
Labor	John Klunder	7,345	38.3	−15.4
Democrats	Stephen Farrelly	2,192	11.4	−2.0
Total formal votes		19,198	95.6	−2.3
Informal votes		880	4.0	+2.3
Turnout		20,078	93.8	−0.4
Two-party-preferred result
Liberal	Brian Billard	10,765	55.9	+15.7
Labor	John Klunder	8,433	43.8	−15.7
Liberal gain from Labor		Swing	+15.7	

1977 South Australian state election: Newland
Party	Candidate	Votes	%	±%
Labor	John Klunder	9,437	53.7	+0.1
Liberal	Emily Perry	5,774	32.9	+9.0
Democrats	Donald Knott	2,345	13.4	+13.4
Total formal votes		17,556	97.9	
Informal votes		380	2.1	
Turnout		17,936	94.2	
Two-party-preferred result
Labor	John Klunder	10,350	59.8	+2.3
Liberal	Emily Perry	7,056	40.2	−2.3
Labor hold		Swing	+2.3	
