= Women in the South Australian House of Assembly =

There have been 60 women in the South Australian House of Assembly since its establishment in 1857. Women have had the right to vote and the right to stand as candidates since 1894.

In 1895, South Australian women became the first state in Australia, and some of the first in the world, to be given the right to vote and stand for election to Parliament. The following year at the 1896 election, the first women in Australia voted. Ironically, South Australia was the last state to elect a female representative, at the 1959 election, when Jessie Cooper and Joyce Steele were elected to the Parliament of South Australia for the Liberal and Country League (LCL). Molly Byrne was the first Labor woman in the House at the 1965 election.

Women have been continuously represented in the House since. Steele would also become the first female minister in 1968. Only three women have represented minor parties, these being Heather Southcott for the Democrats in 1982, Karlene Maywald for the Nationals from 1997 to 2010, and Chantelle Thomas for One Nation since 2026. Liberal Isobel Redmond in 2009 became the first woman to lead a major party in South Australia when she became Leader of the Opposition. Labor's Lyn Breuer from 2010 to 2013 was the first and only female Speaker of the South Australian House of Assembly. South Australia has not had a female Premier or Treasurer.

== List of women in the South Australian House of Assembly ==
Names in bold indicate women who have been appointed as Ministers and Parliamentary Secretaries during their time in Parliament. Names in italics indicate women who were first elected at a by-election. An asterisk (*) indicates that the member also served in the Legislative Council.

#	Name	Party	Electoral Division	Period of service
1	**Joyce Steele**	LCL	Burnside; Davenport	7 March 1959 – 30 May 1970; 30 May 1970 – 9 March 1973 (retired)
2	Molly Byrne	Labor	Barossa; Tea Tree Gully; Todd	6 March 1965 – 30 May 1970; 30 May 1970 – 17 September 1977; 17 September 1977 – 14 September 1979 (defeated)
3	**Jennifer Cashmore**	Liberal	Coles	17 September 1977 – 10 December 1993 (retired)
4	Heather Southcott	Democrats	Mitcham	8 May 1982 – 5 November 1982 (defeated)
5	June Appleby	Labor	Brighton; Hayward	6 November 1982 – 7 December 1985; 7 December 1985 – 24 November 1989 (defeated)
5	**Susan Lenehan**	Labor	Mawson	6 November 1982 – 11 December 1993 (defeated)
7	Di Gayler	Labor	Newland	7 December 1985 – 24 November 1989 (defeated)
8	Colleen Hutchison	Labor	Stuart	25 November 1989 – 11 December 1993 (defeated)
8	**Dorothy Kotz**	Liberal	Newland	25 November 1989 – 17 March 2006 (retired)
10	Julie Greig	Liberal	Reynell	11 December 1993 – 11 October 1997 (defeated)
10	**Joan Hall**	Liberal	Coles; Morialta	11 December 1993 – 9 February 2002; 9 February 2002 – 17 March 2006 (defeated)
10	Annette Hurley	Labor	Napier	11 December 1993 – 9 February 2002 (defeated)
10	Liz Penfold	Liberal	Flinders	11 December 1993 – 20 March 2010 (retired)
10	Lorraine Rosenberg	Liberal	Kaurna	11 December 1993 – 11 October 1997 (defeated)
15	**Lea Stevens**	Labor	Elizabeth; Little Para	9 April 1994 – 18 March 2006; 18 March 2006 – 20 March 2010 (retired)
16	Robyn Geraghty	Labor	Torrens	7 May 1994 – 15 March 2014 (retired)
17	**Trish White**	Labor	Taylor	5 November 1994 – 20 March 2010 (retired)
18	Frances Bedford	Labor/Independent	Florey	11 October 1997 – 19 March 2022 (defeated)
18	Lyn Breuer	Labor	Giles	11 October 1997 – 15 March 2014 (retired)
18	Vini Ciccarello	Labor	Norwood	11 October 1997 – 20 March 2010 (defeated)
18	**Steph Key**	Labor	Hanson; Ashford	11 October 1997 – 9 February 2002; 9 February 2002 – 17 March 2018 (retired)
18	**Karlene Maywald**	National	Chaffey	11 October 1997 – 20 March 2010 (defeated)
18	**Jennifer Rankine**	Labor	Wright	11 October 1997 – 17 March 2018 (retired)
18	Gay Thompson	Labor	Reynell	11 October 1997 – 15 March 2014 (retired)
25	**Vickie Chapman**	Liberal	Bragg	9 February 2002 – 31 May 2022 (resigned)
25	**Jane Lomax-Smith**	Labor	Adelaide	9 February 2002 – 20 March 2010 (defeated)
25	Isobel Redmond	Liberal	Heysen	9 February 2002 – 17 March 2018 (retired)
28	**Chloë Fox**	Labor	Bright	18 March 2006 – 15 March 2014 (defeated)
28	**Grace Portolesi**	Labor	Hartley	18 March 2006 – 15 March 2014 (defeated)
28	Lindsay Simmons	Labor	Morialta	18 March 2006 – 20 March 2010 (defeated)
31	**Rachel Sanderson**	Liberal	Adelaide	20 March 2010 – 19 March 2022 (defeated)
31	**Leesa Vlahos**	Labor	Taylor	20 March 2010 – 17 March 2018 (retired)
33	**Zoe Bettison**	Labor	Ramsay	11 February 2012 –
33	**Susan Close**	Labor	Port Adelaide	11 February 2012 – 21 March 2026 (retired)
35	Annabel Digance	Labor	Elder	15 March 2014 – 17 March 2018 (defeated)
35	**Katrine Hildyard**	Labor	Reynell	15 March 2014 –
35	Dana Wortley	Labor	Torrens	15 March 2014 – 21 March 2026 (retired)
38	**Nat Cook**	Labor	Fisher; Hurtle Vale	6 December 2014 – 17 March 2018; 17 March 2018 –
39	Paula Luethen	Liberal	King	17 March 2018 – 19 March 2022 (defeated)
39	**Carolyn Power**	Liberal	Elder	17 March 2018 – 19 March 2022 (defeated)
39	Jayne Stinson	Labor	Badcoe	17 March 2018 –
42	**Andrea Michaels**	Labor	Enfield	9 February 2019 – 21 March 2026 (retired)
43	Sarah Andrews	Labor	Gibson	19 March 2022 –
43	**Nadia Clancy**	Labor	Elder	19 March 2022 –
43	**Lucy Hood**	Labor	Adelaide	19 March 2022 –
43	Ashton Hurn	Liberal	Schubert	19 March 2022 –
43	Catherine Hutchesson	Labor	Waite	19 March 2022 –
43	**Rhiannon Pearce**	Labor	King	19 March 2022 –
43	Penny Pratt	Liberal	Frome	19 March 2022 – 21 March 2026 (defeated)
43	Olivia Savvas	Labor	Newland	19 March 2022 –
43	Erin Thompson	Labor	Davenport	19 March 2022 –
52	Cressida O'Hanlon	Labor	Dunstan	23 March 2024 –
53	Aria Bolkus	Labor	Colton	21 March 2026 –
53	Jenni Mitton	Labor	Mawson	21 March 2026 –
53	Lou Nicholson	Independent	Finniss	21 March 2026 –
53	Jenn Roberts	Labor	Hartley	21 March 2026 –
53	**Alice Rolls**	Labor	Unley	21 March 2026 –
53	Ella Shaw	Labor	Elizabeth	21 March 2026 –
53	Meagan Spencer	Labor	Torrens	21 March 2026 –
53	Chantelle Thomas	One Nation	Narungga	21 March 2026 –
