= Electoral results for the district of Torrens =

South Australian district election results

This is a list of electoral results for the Electoral district of Torrens in South Australian state elections.

== Members for Torrens ==
First incarnation (1902–1915, 5 members)
Member	Party	Term
John Darling Jr.	Australasian National League	1902–1905
John Jenkins	Independent (Liberal)	1902–1905
George Soward	Australasian National League	1902–1905
Thomas Price	United Labor Party	1902–1909
Frederick Coneybeer	United Labor Party	1902–1915
Crawford Vaughan	United Labor Party	1905–1910
George Dankel	United Labor Party	1905–1912
Thomas Hyland Smeaton	United Labor Party	1905–1915
Thomas Ryan	United Labor Party	1909–1912
Herbert Hudd	Liberal Union	1912–1915
Herbert Angas Parsons	Liberal Union	1912–1915
Second incarnation (1938–1985, 1 member)
Member	Party	Term
Shirley Jeffries	Liberal and Country League	1938–1944
Herbert Baldock	Labor Party	1944–1947
Shirley Jeffries	Liberal and Country League	1947–1953
John Travers	Liberal and Country League	1953–1956
John Coumbe	Liberal and Country League	1956–1973
John Coumbe	Liberal Party	1973–1977
Michael Wilson	Liberal Party	1977–1985
Third incarnation (1993–present)
Member	Party	Term
Joe Tiernan	Liberal Party	1993–1994
Robyn Geraghty	Labor Party	1994–2014
Dana Wortley	Labor Party	2014–2026

== Election results ==
=== Elections in the 2020s ===
==== 2026 ====
2026 South Australian state election: Torrens
Party	Candidate	Votes	%	±%
Labor	Meagan Spencer	10,294	43.4	−5.2
One Nation	David Medlock	4,920	20.7	+20.7
Liberal	Haritha Yara	3,781	15.9	−17.7
Greens	Stella Salvemini	3,430	14.5	+3.9
Family First	Mervin Joshua	786	3.3	−3.9
United Voice	Bradley Warren	292	1.2	+1.2
Australian Family	Malcolm Reynolds	236	1.0	+1.0
Total formal votes		23,739	96.2	−0.7
Informal votes		925	3.8	+0.7
Turnout		24,664	87.7	−0.7
Two-candidate-preferred result
Labor	Meagan Spencer	15,582	65.6	+5.6
One Nation	David Medlock	8,157	34.4	+34.4
Labor hold		Swing	+5.6	

==== 2022 ====
2022 South Australian state election: Torrens
Party	Candidate	Votes	%	±%
Labor	Dana Wortley	11,732	48.6	+5.3
Liberal	Ursula Henderson	8,114	33.6	−3.2
Greens	Lazaras Panayiotou	2,559	10.6	+3.3
Family First	Mervin Joshua	1,737	7.2	+7.2
Total formal votes		24,142	96.9	
Informal votes		772	3.1	
Turnout		24,914	88.4	
Two-party-preferred result
Labor	Dana Wortley	14,475	60.0	+4.3
Liberal	Ursula Henderson	9,667	40.0	−4.3
Labor hold		Swing	+4.3	

Distribution of preferences: Torrens
Party	Candidate	Votes	Round 1		Round 2	
Party	Candidate	Votes	Dist.	Total		
Quota (50% + 1)		12,072				
Labor	Dana Wortley	11,732	+334	12,066	+2,409	14,475
Liberal	Ursula Henderson	8,114	+963	9,077	+590	9,667
Greens	Lazaras Panayiotou	2,559	+440	2,999	Excluded	
Family First	Mervin Joshua	1,737	Excluded			

=== Elections in the 2010s ===
==== 2018 ====
2018 South Australian state election: Torrens
Party	Candidate	Votes	%	±%
Labor	Dana Wortley	9,981	45.9	+3.3
Liberal	Therese Kenny	8,817	40.5	−0.4
Greens	Alex Dinovitser	1,668	7.7	−1.7
Dignity	John Duthie	1,289	5.9	+5.5
Total formal votes		21,755	95.8	−0.8
Informal votes		946	4.2	+0.8
Turnout		22,701	90.4	+2.8
Two-party-preferred result
Labor	Dana Wortley	11,872	54.6	+2.1
Liberal	Therese Kenny	9,883	45.4	−2.1
Labor hold		Swing	+2.1	

2014 South Australian state election: Torrens
Party	Candidate	Votes	%	±%
Labor	Dana Wortley	8,959	43.8	−5.9
Liberal	Michael Manetta	8,111	39.6	+5.0
Greens	Anne Walker	1,853	9.1	+1.0
Family First	Owen Hood	1,552	7.6	−0.1
Total formal votes		20,475	96.6	−0.1
Informal votes		727	3.4	+0.1
Turnout		21,202	91.0	−1.0
Two-party-preferred result
Labor	Dana Wortley	10,958	53.5	−4.7
Liberal	Michael Manetta	9,517	46.5	+4.7
Labor hold		Swing	−4.7	

2010 South Australian state election: Torrens
Party	Candidate	Votes	%	±%
Labor	Robyn Geraghty	10,265	49.4	−9.4
Liberal	Stuart Lomax	7,292	35.1	+11.0
Greens	Peter Fiebig	1,657	8.0	+1.5
Family First	Owen Hood	1,575	7.6	+0.3
Total formal votes		20,789	96.4	
Informal votes		710	3.6	
Turnout		21,499	92.0	
Two-party-preferred result
Labor	Robyn Geraghty	11,988	57.7	−11.5
Liberal	Stuart Lomax	8,801	42.3	+11.5
Labor hold		Swing	−11.5	

=== Elections in the 2000s ===
2006 South Australian state election: Torrens
Party	Candidate	Votes	%	±%
Labor	Robyn Geraghty	11,587	58.8	+10.7
Liberal	Adam Howard	4,738	24.0	−8.6
Family First	Owen Hood	1,439	7.3	+1.3
Greens	Sally Reid	1,274	6.5	+6.5
Democrats	Luke Fraser	672	3.4	−5.4
Total formal votes		19,710	96.4	
Informal votes		689	3.6	
Turnout		20,399	92.3	
Two-party-preferred result
Labor	Robyn Geraghty	13,614	69.1	+10.7
Liberal	Adam Howard	6,096	30.9	−10.7
Labor hold		Swing	+10.7	

2002 South Australian state election: Torrens
Party	Candidate	Votes	%	±%
Labor	Robyn Geraghty	9,840	47.1	−0.9
Liberal	Damian Wyld	7,063	33.8	+1.7
Democrats	Tony Hill	1,824	8.7	−7.4
Family First	Carolyn Halfpenny	1,245	6.0	+6.0
SA First	Harry Krieg	518	2.5	+2.5
One Nation	Malcolm Hilliard	422	2.0	+2.0
Total formal votes		20,912	96.6	
Informal votes		733	3.4	
Turnout		21,645	93.9	
Two-party-preferred result
Labor	Robyn Geraghty	11,968	57.2	−3.1
Liberal	Damian Wyld	8,944	42.8	+3.1
Labor hold		Swing	−3.1	

=== Elections in the 1990s ===
1997 South Australian state election: Torrens
Party	Candidate	Votes	%	±%
Labor	Robyn Geraghty	9,096	48.0	+12.5
Liberal	Geoff Harris	6,226	32.9	−15.5
Democrats	Tony Hill	2,895	15.3	+5.6
United Australia	Ronald Lupp	731	3.9	+3.9
Total formal votes		18,948	96.0	+0.1
Informal votes		796	4.0	−0.1
Turnout		19,744	92.6	
Two-party-preferred result
Labor	Robyn Geraghty	11,380	60.1	+16.6
Liberal	Geoff Harris	7,568	39.9	−16.6
Labor gain from Liberal		Swing	+16.6	

1994 Torrens state by-election
Party	Candidate	Votes	%	±%
Labor	Robyn Geraghty	8,261	47.14	+11.66
Liberal	Stephen Ernst	7,785	44.42	−3.98
HEMP	David Sag	459	2.62	+2.62
Independent (No Mining in National Parks)	Scott Wilson	336	1.92	+1.92
Grey Power	William Patrick	224	1.28	+1.28
Independent (Christians for Law and Order)	Robert Payne	214	1.22	+1.22
Independent	Bernhard Cotton	166	0.95	+0.95
Independent (Smokers' Rights)	Dorothy Bremert	79	0.45	+0.45
Total formal votes		17,524	95.78	−0.10
Informal votes		773	4.22	+0.10
Turnout		18,297	85.34	−8.89
Two-party-preferred result
Labor	Robyn Geraghty	9,185	52.41	+8.63
Liberal	Stephen Ernst	8,339	47.59	−8.63
Labor gain from Liberal		Swing	+8.63	

1993 South Australian state election: Torrens
Party	Candidate	Votes	%	±%
Liberal	Joe Tiernan	9,368	48.4	+9.7
Labor	John Klunder	6,868	35.5	−12.2
Democrats	Jennifer Whitehead	1,873	9.7	−2.4
Call to Australia	Thomas Curnow	505	2.6	+1.2
Natural Law	Dianne Fenwick	376	1.9	+1.9
Independent	Aniello Carbone	365	1.9	+1.9
Total formal votes		19,355	95.9	−1.1
Informal votes		832	4.1	+1.1
Turnout		20,187	94.2	
Two-party-preferred result
Liberal	Joe Tiernan	10,943	56.5	+11.0
Labor	John Klunder	8,412	43.5	−11.0
Liberal gain from Labor		Swing	+11.0	

=== Elections in the 1980s ===
1982 South Australian state election: Torrens
Party	Candidate	Votes	%	±%
Liberal	Michael Wilson	7,602	52.0	−4.0
Labor	Michael Duigan	6,277	43.0	+8.0
Democrats	Joseph Zingarelli	732	5.0	−4.0
Total formal votes		14,611	95.6	−0.8
Informal votes		674	4.4	+0.8
Turnout		15,285	90.4	+0.6
Two-party-preferred result
Liberal	Michael Wilson	7,961	54.5	−5.6
Labor	Michael Duigan	6,650	45.5	+5.6
Liberal hold		Swing	−5.6	

=== Elections in the 1970s ===
1979 South Australian state election: Torrens
Party	Candidate	Votes	%	±%
Liberal	Michael Wilson	8,186	56.0	+5.5
Labor	Ralph Clarke	5,113	35.0	−11.2
Democrats	Stuart Brasted	1,313	9.0	+9.0
Total formal votes		14,612	96.4	−1.3
Informal votes		548	3.6	+1.3
Turnout		15,160	89.8	−0.5
Two-party-preferred result
Liberal	Michael Wilson	8,777	60.1	+7.6
Labor	Ralph Clarke	5,835	39.9	−7.6
Liberal hold		Swing	+7.6	

1977 South Australian state election: Torrens
Party	Candidate	Votes	%	±%
Liberal	Michael Wilson	7,819	50.5	+10.7
Labor	Ralph Clarke	7,138	46.2	+5.8
Workers	Leslie Huxley	514	3.3	+3.3
Total formal votes		15,471	97.7	
Informal votes		362	2.3	
Turnout		15,833	90.3	
Two-party-preferred result
Liberal	Michael Wilson	8,119	52.5	−4.1
Labor	Ralph Clarke	7,347	47.5	+4.1
Liberal hold		Swing	−4.1	

1975 South Australian state election: Torrens
Party	Candidate	Votes	%	±%
Labor	Nick Bolkus	6,266	40.4	−4.4
Liberal	John Coumbe	6,144	39.8	−15.4
Liberal Movement	Brian Billard	3,049	19.8	+19.8
Total formal votes		15,419	96.9	+0.1
Informal votes		486	3.1	−0.1
Turnout		15,905	91.9	−0.9
Two-party-preferred result
Liberal	John Coumbe	8,652	56.1	+0.9
Labor	Nick Bolkus	6,767	43.9	−0.9
Liberal hold		Swing	+0.9	

1973 South Australian state election: Torrens
Party	Candidate	Votes	%	±%
Liberal and Country	John Coumbe	8,202	55.2	+1.3
Labor	Christopher Sumner	6,669	44.8	+1.9
Total formal votes		14,871	96.8	−1.2
Informal votes		498	3.2	+1.2
Turnout		15,369	92.8	0.0
Liberal and Country hold		Swing	−1.4	

1970 South Australian state election: Torrens
Party	Candidate	Votes	%	±%
Liberal and Country	John Coumbe	7,823	53.9	
Labor	Mark Harrison	6,233	42.9	
Democratic Labor	Gary Lockwood	464	3.2	
Total formal votes		14,520	98.0	
Informal votes		292	2.0	
Turnout		14,812	92.8	
Two-party-preferred result
Liberal and Country	John Coumbe	8,218	56.6	
Labor	Mark Harrison	6,302	43.4	
Liberal and Country hold		Swing		

=== Elections in the 1960s ===
1968 South Australian state election: Torrens
Party	Candidate	Votes	%	±%
Liberal and Country	John Coumbe	9,126	52.3	+3.8
Labor	Terry McRae	7,578	42.6	−1.1
Democratic Labor	George Basivovs	1,076	6.1	−0.1
Total formal votes		17,780	97.5	−0.4
Informal votes		462	2.5	+0.4
Turnout		18,242	93.6	−0.6
Two-party-preferred result
Liberal and Country	John Coumbe	10,041	56.5	+2.4
Labor	Terry McRae	7,739	43.5	−2.4
Liberal and Country hold		Swing	+2.4	

1965 South Australian state election: Torrens
Party	Candidate	Votes	%	±%
Liberal and Country	John Coumbe	8,937	48.5	−1.3
Labor	Chris Hurford	8,063	43.7	−1.6
Democratic Labor	Charles Bradley	1,136	6.2	+1.4
Social Credit	Russell Sellars	310	1.7	+1.7
Total formal votes		18,446	97.9	−0.5
Informal votes		397	2.1	+0.5
Turnout		18,843	94.2	+0.2
Two-party-preferred result
Liberal and Country	John Coumbe	9,982	54.1	+0.2
Labor	Chris Hurford	8,464	45.9	−0.2
Liberal and Country hold		Swing	+0.2	

1962 South Australian state election: Torrens
Party	Candidate	Votes	%	±%
Liberal and Country	John Coumbe	9,642	49.8	−4.1
Labor	Christopher Hurford	8,770	45.3	+5.9
Democratic Labor	Ursula Cock	933	4.8	−1.9
Total formal votes		19,345	98.4	+0.1
Informal votes		312	1.6	−0.1
Turnout		19,657	94.0	+1.6
Two-party-preferred result
Liberal and Country	John Coumbe	10,421	53.9	−5.7
Labor	Christopher Hurford	8,652	46.1	+5.7
Liberal and Country hold		Swing	−5.7	
