= Electoral results for the district of Todd =

South Australian district election results

This is a list of election results for the electoral district of Todd in South Australian elections.

== Members for Todd ==
Member	Party	Term
Molly Byrne	Labor	1977–1979
Scott Ashenden	Liberal	1979–1985
John Klunder	Labor	1985–1993

== Election results ==
=== Elections in the 1980s ===
1989 South Australian state election: Todd
Party	Candidate	Votes	%	±%
Labor	John Klunder	8,822	46.8	−6.4
Liberal	Ernest Harders de Braconier	7,635	40.5	−1.7
Democrats	David Ball	1,834	9.7	+5.1
Call to Australia	Tom Curnow	557	3.0	+3.0
Total formal votes		18,848	97.0	+0.3
Informal votes		580	3.0	−0.3
Turnout		19,428	95.7	−1.0
Two-party-preferred result
Labor	John Klunder	9,958	52.8	−3.1
Liberal	Ernest Harders de Braconier	8,890	47.2	+3.1
Labor hold		Swing	−3.1	

1985 South Australian state election: Todd
Party	Candidate	Votes	%	±%
Labor	John Klunder	9,203	53.2	+3.3
Liberal	Jeff Nicholas	7,287	42.2	−2.8
Democrats	Aussie Kanck	792	4.6	−0.4
Total formal votes		17,282	96.7	
Informal votes		582	3.3	
Turnout		17,864	94.7	
Two-party-preferred result
Labor	John Klunder	9,669	55.9	+3.9
Liberal	Jeff Nicholas	7,613	44.1	−3.9
Labor gain from Liberal		Swing	+3.9	

- Todd became a notionally Labor held seat in the redistribution.

1982 South Australian state election: Todd
Party	Candidate	Votes	%	±%
Liberal	Scott Ashenden	8,664	46.1	−3.7
Labor	John Lewis	8,358	44.5	+3.7
Democrats	Sandra Kanck	1,213	6.5	−2.9
National	Rex Senior	538	2.9	+2.9
Total formal votes		18,773	95.1	−0.9
Informal votes		959	4.9	+0.9
Turnout		19,732	94.9	+0.9
Two-party-preferred result
Liberal	Scott Ashenden	9,652	51.4	−3.2
Labor	John Lewis	9,121	48.6	+3.2
Liberal hold		Swing	−3.2	

=== Elections in the 1970s ===
1979 South Australian state election: Todd
Party	Candidate	Votes	%	±%
Liberal	Scott Ashenden	8,478	49.8	+6.3
Labor	Molly Byrne	6,935	40.8	−15.7
Democrats	Michael Reglar	1,595	9.4	+9.4
Total formal votes		17,008	96.0	−1.6
Informal votes		711	4.0	+1.6
Turnout		17,719	94.0	−1.0
Two-party-preferred result
Liberal	Scott Ashenden	9,287	54.6	+11.1
Labor	Molly Byrne	7,721	45.4	−11.1
Liberal gain from Labor		Swing	+11.1	

1977 South Australian state election: Todd
Party	Candidate	Votes	%	±%
Labor	Molly Byrne	9,273	56.5	+1.9
Liberal	Robert Ritson	7,136	43.5	+21.2
Total formal votes		16,409	97.6	
Informal votes		407	2.4	
Turnout		16,816	95.0	
Labor hold		Swing	−1.9	
