= List of senators from South Australia =

South Australia Australian Senate
- Created: 1901
- Party: Liberal (5); Labor (5); Greens (2)

This is a list of senators from the state of South Australia since the Federation of Australia in 1901.

== List ==
Senate	Election	Senator (Party)	Senator (Party)	Senator (Party)	Senator (Party)	Senator (Party)	Senator (Party)	Senator (Party)	Senator (Party)	Senator (Party)	Senator (Party)	Senator (Party)	Senator (Party)
1901–1903	1901	David Charleston (Free Trade)	Gregor McGregor (Labor)	Thomas Playford (Protectionist)	Sir Richard Baker (Free Trade)	Sir Josiah Symon (Free Trade/ Liberal)	Sir John Downer (Protectionist)	6 senators per state 1901-1950					
1904–1906	1903	Robert Guthrie (Labor/ National Labor/ Nationalist)	Gregor McGregor (Labor)	Thomas Playford (Protectionist)	Sir Richard Baker (Free Trade)	Sir Josiah Symon (Free Trade/ Liberal)	William Story (Labor/ National Labor/ Nationalist)	6 senators per state 1901-1950					
1907–1910	1906	Robert Guthrie (Labor/ National Labor/ Nationalist)	Gregor McGregor (Labor)	Joseph Vardon (Anti-Socialist)	William Russell (Labor)	Sir Josiah Symon (Free Trade/ Liberal)	William Story (Labor/ National Labor/ Nationalist)	6 senators per state 1901-1950					
1907–1910	1907	Robert Guthrie (Labor/ National Labor/ Nationalist)	Gregor McGregor (Labor)	James O'Loghlin (Labor)	William Russell (Labor)	Sir Josiah Symon (Free Trade/ Liberal)	William Story (Labor/ National Labor/ Nationalist)	6 senators per state 1901-1950					
1907–1910	1908	Robert Guthrie (Labor/ National Labor/ Nationalist)	Gregor McGregor (Labor)	Joseph Vardon (Anti-Socialist/ Liberal)	William Russell (Labor)	Sir Josiah Symon (Free Trade/ Liberal)	William Story (Labor/ National Labor/ Nationalist)	6 senators per state 1901-1950					
1907–1910	1909	Robert Guthrie (Labor/ National Labor/ Nationalist)	Gregor McGregor (Labor)	Joseph Vardon (Anti-Socialist/ Liberal)	William Russell (Labor)	Sir Josiah Symon (Free Trade/ Liberal)	William Story (Labor/ National Labor/ Nationalist)	6 senators per state 1901-1950					
1910–1913	1910	Robert Guthrie (Labor/ National Labor/ Nationalist)	Gregor McGregor (Labor)	Joseph Vardon (Anti-Socialist/ Liberal)	William Russell (Labor)	Sir Josiah Symon (Free Trade/ Liberal)	William Story (Labor/ National Labor/ Nationalist)	6 senators per state 1901-1950					
1910–1913	1912	Robert Guthrie (Labor/ National Labor/ Nationalist)	Gregor McGregor (Labor)	Joseph Vardon (Anti-Socialist/ Liberal)	John Shannon (Liberal)	Sir Josiah Symon (Free Trade/ Liberal)	William Story (Labor/ National Labor/ Nationalist)	6 senators per state 1901-1950					
1913–1914	1913	Robert Guthrie (Labor/ National Labor/ Nationalist)	Gregor McGregor (Labor)	John Newlands (Liberal/ Nationalist/ UAP)	William Senior (Labor/ National Labor/ Nationalist)	James O'Loghlin (Labor)	William Story (Labor/ National Labor/ Nationalist)	6 senators per state 1901-1950					
1914–1917	1914	Robert Guthrie (Labor/ National Labor/ Nationalist)	John Shannon (Liberal/ Nationalist)	John Newlands (Liberal/ Nationalist/ UAP)	William Senior (Labor/ National Labor/ Nationalist)	James O'Loghlin (Labor)	William Story (Labor/ National Labor/ Nationalist)	6 senators per state 1901-1950					
1914–1917	1916	Robert Guthrie (Labor/ National Labor/ Nationalist)	John Shannon (Liberal/ Nationalist)	John Newlands (Liberal/ Nationalist/ UAP)	William Senior (Labor/ National Labor/ Nationalist)	James O'Loghlin (Labor)	William Story (Labor/ National Labor/ Nationalist)	6 senators per state 1901-1950					
1914–1917	Feb 1917	Robert Guthrie (Labor/ National Labor/ Nationalist)	John Shannon (Liberal/ Nationalist)	John Newlands (Liberal/ Nationalist/ UAP)	William Senior (Labor/ National Labor/ Nationalist)	James O'Loghlin (Labor)	William Story (Labor/ National Labor/ Nationalist)	6 senators per state 1901-1950					
1914–1917	May 1917	Robert Guthrie (Labor/ National Labor/ Nationalist)	John Shannon (Liberal/ Nationalist)	John Newlands (Liberal/ Nationalist/ UAP)	William Senior (Labor/ National Labor/ Nationalist)	James O'Loghlin (Labor)	James Rowell (Nationalist/ Liberal Union)	6 senators per state 1901-1950					
1917–1920	1917	Robert Guthrie (Labor/ National Labor/ Nationalist)	John Shannon (Liberal/ Nationalist)	John Newlands (Liberal/ Nationalist/ UAP)	William Senior (Labor/ National Labor/ Nationalist)	James O'Loghlin (Labor)	James Rowell (Nationalist/ Liberal Union)	6 senators per state 1901-1950					
1920–1923	1919	Robert Guthrie (Labor/ National Labor/ Nationalist)	Benjamin Benny (Nationalist)	John Newlands (Liberal/ Nationalist/ UAP)	William Senior (Labor/ National Labor/ Nationalist)	Victor Wilson (Nationalist)	James Rowell (Nationalist/ Liberal Union)	6 senators per state 1901-1950					
1920–1923	1921	Edward Vardon (Nationalist)	Benjamin Benny (Nationalist)	John Newlands (Liberal/ Nationalist/ UAP)	William Senior (Labor/ National Labor/ Nationalist)	Victor Wilson (Nationalist)	James Rowell (Nationalist/ Liberal Union)	6 senators per state 1901-1950					
1920–1923	1922	Bert Hoare (Labor)	Benjamin Benny (Nationalist)	John Newlands (Liberal/ Nationalist/ UAP)	William Senior (Labor/ National Labor/ Nationalist)	Victor Wilson (Nationalist)	James Rowell (Nationalist/ Liberal Union)	6 senators per state 1901-1950					
1923–1926	1922	Bert Hoare (Labor)	Benjamin Benny (Nationalist)	John Newlands (Liberal/ Nationalist/ UAP)	Charles McHugh (Labor)	Victor Wilson (Nationalist)	James O'Loghlin (Labor)	6 senators per state 1901-1950					
1923–1926	1925	Bert Hoare (Labor)	Benjamin Benny (Nationalist)	John Newlands (Liberal/ Nationalist/ UAP)	Charles McHugh (Labor)	Victor Wilson (Nationalist)	Henry Barwell (Nationalist)	6 senators per state 1901-1950					
1923–1926	1926	Bert Hoare (Labor)	Alexander McLachlan (Nationalist/ UAP)	John Newlands (Liberal/ Nationalist/ UAP)	Charles McHugh (Labor)	Victor Wilson (Nationalist)	Henry Barwell (Nationalist)	6 senators per state 1901-1950					
1926–1929	1925	Bert Hoare (Labor)	Alexander McLachlan (Nationalist/ UAP)	John Newlands (Liberal/ Nationalist/ UAP)	Charles McHugh (Labor)	John Chapman (Country)	Henry Barwell (Nationalist)	6 senators per state 1901-1950					
1926–1929	1927	Bert Hoare (Labor)	Alexander McLachlan (Nationalist/ UAP)	John Newlands (Liberal/ Nationalist/ UAP)	John Verran (Nationalist)	John Chapman (Country)	Henry Barwell (Nationalist)	6 senators per state 1901-1950					
1926–1929	April 1928	Bert Hoare (Labor)	Alexander McLachlan (Nationalist/ UAP)	John Newlands (Liberal/ Nationalist/ UAP)	John Verran (Nationalist)	John Chapman (Country)	Albert Robinson (Nationalist)	6 senators per state 1901-1950					
1926–1929	Nov 1928	Bert Hoare (Labor)	Alexander McLachlan (Nationalist/ UAP)	John Newlands (Liberal/ Nationalist/ UAP)	John Daly (Labor)	John Chapman (Country)	Mick O'Halloran (Labor)	6 senators per state 1901-1950					
1929–1932	1928	Bert Hoare (Labor)	Alexander McLachlan (Nationalist/ UAP)	John Newlands (Liberal/ Nationalist/ UAP)	John Daly (Labor)	John Chapman (Country)	Mick O'Halloran (Labor)	6 senators per state 1901-1950					
1929–1932	April 1931	Bert Hoare (Labor)	Alexander McLachlan (Nationalist/ UAP)	John Newlands (Liberal/ Nationalist/ UAP)	John Daly (Labor)	Harry Kneebone (Labor)	Mick O'Halloran (Labor)	6 senators per state 1901-1950					
1929–1932	May 1931	Bert Hoare (Labor)	Alexander McLachlan (Nationalist/ UAP)	John Newlands (Liberal/ Nationalist/ UAP)	John Daly (Labor)	Harry Kneebone (Labor)	Mick O'Halloran (Labor)	6 senators per state 1901-1950					
1929–1932	Dec 1931	Bert Hoare (Labor)	Alexander McLachlan (Nationalist/ UAP)	John Newlands (Liberal/ Nationalist/ UAP)	John Daly (Labor)	Jack Duncan-Hughes (UAP)	Mick O'Halloran (Labor)	6 senators per state 1901-1950					
1932–1935	1931	Bert Hoare (Labor)	Alexander McLachlan (Nationalist/ UAP)	Oliver Badman (Country)	John Daly (Labor)	Jack Duncan-Hughes (UAP)	Mick O'Halloran (Labor)	6 senators per state 1901-1950					
1935–1938	1934	George McLeay (UAP/ Liberal)	Alexander McLachlan (Nationalist/ UAP)	Oliver Badman (Country)	Oliver Uppill (UAP)	Jack Duncan-Hughes (UAP)	James McLachlan (UAP/ Liberal)	6 senators per state 1901-1950					
1935–1938	1937	George McLeay (UAP/ Liberal)	Alexander McLachlan (Nationalist/ UAP)	Philip McBride (UAP)	Oliver Uppill (UAP)	Jack Duncan-Hughes (UAP)	James McLachlan (UAP/ Liberal)	6 senators per state 1901-1950					
1938–1941	1937	George McLeay (UAP/ Liberal)	Alexander McLachlan (Nationalist/ UAP)	Philip McBride (UAP)	Oliver Uppill (UAP)	Keith Wilson (UAP)	James McLachlan (UAP/ Liberal)	6 senators per state 1901-1950					
1941–1944	1940	George McLeay (UAP/ Liberal)	Alexander McLachlan (Nationalist/ UAP)	Philip McBride (UAP)	Oliver Uppill (UAP)	Keith Wilson (UAP)	James McLachlan (UAP/ Liberal)	6 senators per state 1901-1950					
1944–1947	1943	George McLeay (UAP/ Liberal)	Theo Nicholls (Labor)	Alex Finlay (Labor)	Oliver Uppill (UAP)	Sid O'Flaherty (Labor)	James McLachlan (UAP/ Liberal)	6 senators per state 1901-1950					
1944–1947	1944	George McLeay (UAP/ Liberal)	Theo Nicholls (Labor)	Alex Finlay (Labor)	Ted Mattner (UAP/ Liberal)	Sid O'Flaherty (Labor)	James McLachlan (UAP/ Liberal)	6 senators per state 1901-1950					
1944–1947	1945	George McLeay (UAP/ Liberal)	Theo Nicholls (Labor)	Alex Finlay (Labor)	Ted Mattner (UAP/ Liberal)	Sid O'Flaherty (Labor)	James McLachlan (UAP/ Liberal)	6 senators per state 1901-1950					
1944–1947	1946	George McLeay (UAP/ Liberal)	Theo Nicholls (Labor)	Alex Finlay (Labor)	Fred Beerworth (Labor)	Sid O'Flaherty (Labor)	James McLachlan (UAP/ Liberal)	6 senators per state 1901-1950					
1947–1950	1946	Frederick Ward (Labor)	Theo Nicholls (Labor)	Alex Finlay (Labor)	Fred Beerworth (Labor)	Sid O'Flaherty (Labor)	Jack Critchley (Labor)	6 senators per state 1901-1950					
1947–1950	1950	Frederick Ward (Labor)	Theo Nicholls (Labor)	Alex Finlay (Labor)	Fred Beerworth (Labor)	Sid O'Flaherty (Labor)	Jack Critchley (Labor)	Clive Hannaford (Liberal)	George McLeay (Liberal)	John Ryan (Labor)	Ted Mattner (Liberal)	10 senators per state 1950-1984	
1950–1951	1949	Frederick Ward (Labor)	Theo Nicholls (Labor)	Alex Finlay (Labor)	Fred Beerworth (Labor)	Sid O'Flaherty (Labor)	Jack Critchley (Labor)	Clive Hannaford (Liberal)	George McLeay (Liberal)	John Ryan (Labor)	Ted Mattner (Liberal)	10 senators per state 1950-1984	
1951–1953	1951	Keith Laught (Liberal)	Theo Nicholls (Labor)	Alex Finlay (Labor)	Rex Pearson (Liberal)	Sid O'Flaherty (Labor)	Jack Critchley (Labor)	Clive Hannaford (Liberal)	George McLeay (Liberal)	John Ryan (Labor)	Ted Mattner (Liberal)	10 senators per state 1950-1984	
1953–1956	1953	Keith Laught (Liberal)	Theo Nicholls (Labor)	Jim Toohey (Labor)	Rex Pearson (Liberal)	Sid O'Flaherty (Labor)	Jack Critchley (Labor)	Clive Hannaford (Liberal)	George McLeay (Liberal)	John Ryan (Labor)	Ted Mattner (Liberal)	10 senators per state 1950-1984	
1953–1956	1955	Keith Laught (Liberal)	Theo Nicholls (Labor)	Jim Toohey (Labor)	Rex Pearson (Liberal)	Sid O'Flaherty (Labor)	Jack Critchley (Labor)	Clive Hannaford (Liberal)	Nancy Buttfield (Liberal)	John Ryan (Labor)	Ted Mattner (Liberal)	10 senators per state 1950-1984	
1956–1959	1955	Keith Laught (Liberal)	Theo Nicholls (Labor)	Jim Toohey (Labor)	Rex Pearson (Liberal)	Sid O'Flaherty (Labor)	Jack Critchley (Labor)	Clive Hannaford (Liberal)	Nancy Buttfield (Liberal)	John Ryan (Labor)	Ted Mattner (Liberal)	10 senators per state 1950-1984	
1959–1962	1958	Keith Laught (Liberal)	Theo Nicholls (Labor)	Jim Toohey (Labor)	Rex Pearson (Liberal)	Sid O'Flaherty (Labor)	Arnold Drury (Labor)	Clive Hannaford (Liberal)	Nancy Buttfield (Liberal)	Clem Ridley (Labor)	Ted Mattner (Liberal)	10 senators per state 1950-1984	
1959–1962	Sep 1961	Keith Laught (Liberal)	Theo Nicholls (Labor)	Jim Toohey (Labor)	Gordon Davidson (Liberal)	Sid O'Flaherty (Labor)	Arnold Drury (Labor)	Clive Hannaford (Liberal)	Nancy Buttfield (Liberal)	Clem Ridley (Labor)	Ted Mattner (Liberal)	10 senators per state 1950-1984	
1959–1962	Dec 1961	Keith Laught (Liberal)	Theo Nicholls (Labor)	Jim Toohey (Labor)	Nancy Buttfield (Liberal)	Sid O'Flaherty (Labor)	Arnold Drury (Labor)	Clive Hannaford (Liberal)	Vacant	Clem Ridley (Labor)	Ted Mattner (Liberal)	10 senators per state 1950-1984	
1959–1962	1962	Keith Laught (Liberal)	Theo Nicholls (Labor)	Jim Toohey (Labor)	Nancy Buttfield (Liberal)	Sid O'Flaherty (Labor)	Arnold Drury (Labor)	Clive Hannaford (Liberal)	Gordon Davidson (Liberal)	Clem Ridley (Labor)	Ted Mattner (Liberal)	10 senators per state 1950-1984	
1962–1965	1961	Keith Laught (Liberal)	Theo Nicholls (Labor)	Jim Toohey (Labor)	Nancy Buttfield (Liberal)	Jim Cavanagh (Labor)	Arnold Drury (Labor)	Clive Hannaford (Liberal)	Reg Bishop (Labor)	Clem Ridley (Labor)	Ted Mattner (Liberal)	10 senators per state 1950-1984	
1965–1968	1964	Keith Laught (Liberal)	Theo Nicholls (Labor)	Jim Toohey (Labor)	Gordon Davidson (Liberal)	Jim Cavanagh (Labor)	Arnold Drury (Labor)	Clive Hannaford (Liberal)	Reg Bishop (Labor)	Clem Ridley (Labor)	Ted Mattner (Liberal)	10 senators per state 1950-1984	
1965–1968	1967	Keith Laught (Liberal)	Theo Nicholls (Labor)	Jim Toohey (Labor)	Gordon Davidson (Liberal)	Jim Cavanagh (Labor)	Arnold Drury (Labor)	Sir Condor Laucke (Liberal)	Reg Bishop (Labor)	Clem Ridley (Labor)	Ted Mattner (Liberal)	10 senators per state 1950-1984	
1968–1971	1967	Keith Laught (Liberal)	Harold Young (Liberal)	Jim Toohey (Labor)	Gordon Davidson (Liberal)	Jim Cavanagh (Labor)	Arnold Drury (Labor)	Sir Condor Laucke (Liberal)	Reg Bishop (Labor)	Clem Ridley (Labor)	Nancy Buttfield (Liberal)	10 senators per state 1950-1984	
1968–1971	May 1969	Martin Cameron (Liberal)	Harold Young (Liberal)	Jim Toohey (Labor)	Gordon Davidson (Liberal)	Jim Cavanagh (Labor)	Arnold Drury (Labor)	Sir Condor Laucke (Liberal)	Reg Bishop (Labor)	Clem Ridley (Labor)	Nancy Buttfield (Liberal)	10 senators per state 1950-1984	
1968–1971	Oct 1969	Don Cameron (Labor)	Harold Young (Liberal)	Jim Toohey (Labor)	Gordon Davidson (Liberal)	Jim Cavanagh (Labor)	Arnold Drury (Labor)	Sir Condor Laucke (Liberal)	Reg Bishop (Labor)	Clem Ridley (Labor)	Nancy Buttfield (Liberal)	10 senators per state 1950-1984	
1971–1974	1970	Don Cameron (Labor)	Harold Young (Liberal)	Geoff McLaren (Labor)	Gordon Davidson (Liberal)	Jim Cavanagh (Labor)	Arnold Drury (Labor)	Sir Condor Laucke (Liberal)	Reg Bishop (Labor)	Don Jessop (Liberal)	Nancy Buttfield (Liberal)	10 senators per state 1950-1984	
1974–1975	1974	Don Cameron (Labor)	Harold Young (Liberal)	Geoff McLaren (Labor)	Gordon Davidson (Liberal)	Jim Cavanagh (Labor)	Arnold Drury (Labor)	Sir Condor Laucke (Liberal)	Reg Bishop (Labor)	Don Jessop (Liberal)	Steele Hall (Liberal Movement/ Liberal)	10 senators per state 1950-1984	
1975–1978	1975	Don Cameron (Labor)	Harold Young (Liberal)	Geoff McLaren (Labor)	Gordon Davidson (Liberal)	Jim Cavanagh (Labor)	Tony Messner (Liberal)	Sir Condor Laucke (Liberal)	Reg Bishop (Labor)	Don Jessop (Liberal)	Steele Hall (Liberal Movement/ Liberal)	10 senators per state 1950-1984	
1975–1978	1976	Don Cameron (Labor)	Harold Young (Liberal)	Geoff McLaren (Labor)	Gordon Davidson (Liberal)	Jim Cavanagh (Labor)	Tony Messner (Liberal)	Sir Condor Laucke (Liberal)	Reg Bishop (Labor)	Don Jessop (Liberal)	Steele Hall (Liberal Movement/ Liberal)	10 senators per state 1950-1984	
1975–1978	1977	Don Cameron (Labor)	Harold Young (Liberal)	Geoff McLaren (Labor)	Gordon Davidson (Liberal)	Jim Cavanagh (Labor)	Tony Messner (Liberal)	Sir Condor Laucke (Liberal)	Reg Bishop (Labor)	Don Jessop (Liberal)	Janine Haines (Democrat)	10 senators per state 1950-1984	
1978–1981	1977	Ron Elstob (Labor)	Harold Young (Liberal)	Geoff McLaren (Labor)	Gordon Davidson (Liberal)	Jim Cavanagh (Labor)	Tony Messner (Liberal)	Sir Condor Laucke (Liberal)	Reg Bishop (Labor)	Don Jessop (Liberal)	Baden Teague (Liberal)	10 senators per state 1950-1984	
1981–1983	1980	Ron Elstob (Labor)	Harold Young (Liberal)	Geoff McLaren (Labor)	Robert Hill (Liberal)	Dominic Foreman (Labor)	Tony Messner (Liberal)	Janine Haines (Democrat)	Nick Bolkus (Labor)	Don Jessop (Liberal)	Baden Teague (Liberal)	10 senators per state 1950-1984	
1983–1985	1983	Ron Elstob (Labor)	Rosemary Crowley (Labor)	Graham Maguire (Labor)	Robert Hill (Liberal)	Dominic Foreman (Labor)	Tony Messner (Liberal)	Janine Haines (Democrat)	Nick Bolkus (Labor)	Don Jessop (Liberal)	Baden Teague (Liberal)	10 senators per state 1950-1984	
1983–1985	1984	Ron Elstob (Labor)	Rosemary Crowley (Labor)	Graham Maguire (Labor)	Robert Hill (Liberal)	Dominic Foreman (Labor)	Tony Messner (Liberal)	Janine Haines (Democrat)	Nick Bolkus (Labor)	Don Jessop (Liberal)	Baden Teague (Liberal)	Amanda Vanstone (Liberal)	David Vigor (Democrat/ Unite Australia)
1985–1987	1984	Ron Elstob (Labor)	Rosemary Crowley (Labor)	Graham Maguire (Labor)	Robert Hill (Liberal)	Dominic Foreman (Labor)	Tony Messner (Liberal)	Janine Haines (Democrat)	Nick Bolkus (Labor)	Don Jessop (Liberal)	Baden Teague (Liberal)	Amanda Vanstone (Liberal)	David Vigor (Democrat/ Unite Australia)
1985–1987	1987	Ron Elstob (Labor)	Rosemary Crowley (Labor)	Graham Maguire (Labor)	Robert Hill (Liberal)	Dominic Foreman (Labor)	Tony Messner (Liberal)	Janine Haines (Democrat)	Nick Bolkus (Labor)	Don Jessop (Liberal)	Baden Teague (Liberal)	Amanda Vanstone (Liberal)	David Vigor (Democrat/ Unite Australia)
1987–1990	1987	Chris Schacht (Labor)	Rosemary Crowley (Labor)	Graham Maguire (Labor)	Robert Hill (Liberal)	Dominic Foreman (Labor)	Tony Messner (Liberal)	Janine Haines (Democrat)	Nick Bolkus (Labor)	Grant Chapman (Liberal)	Baden Teague (Liberal)	Amanda Vanstone (Liberal)	John Coulter (Democrat)
1987–1990	1990	Chris Schacht (Labor)	Rosemary Crowley (Labor)	Graham Maguire (Labor)	Robert Hill (Liberal)	Dominic Foreman (Labor)	John Olsen (Liberal)	Meg Lees (Democrat/ Independent/ Progressive Alliance)	Nick Bolkus (Labor)	Grant Chapman (Liberal)	Baden Teague (Liberal)	Amanda Vanstone (Liberal)	John Coulter (Democrat)
1990–1993	1990	Chris Schacht (Labor)	Rosemary Crowley (Labor)	Graham Maguire (Labor)	Robert Hill (Liberal)	Dominic Foreman (Labor)	John Olsen (Liberal)	Meg Lees (Democrat/ Independent/ Progressive Alliance)	Nick Bolkus (Labor)	Grant Chapman (Liberal)	Baden Teague (Liberal)	Amanda Vanstone (Liberal)	John Coulter (Democrat)
1990–1993	1992	Chris Schacht (Labor)	Rosemary Crowley (Labor)	Graham Maguire (Labor)	Robert Hill (Liberal)	Dominic Foreman (Labor)	Alan Ferguson (Liberal)	Meg Lees (Democrat/ Independent/ Progressive Alliance)	Nick Bolkus (Labor)	Grant Chapman (Liberal)	Baden Teague (Liberal)	Amanda Vanstone (Liberal)	John Coulter (Democrat)
1993–1996	1993	Chris Schacht (Labor)	Rosemary Crowley (Labor)	Nick Minchin (Liberal)	Robert Hill (Liberal)	Dominic Foreman (Labor)	Alan Ferguson (Liberal)	Meg Lees (Democrat/ Independent/ Progressive Alliance)	Nick Bolkus (Labor)	Grant Chapman (Liberal)	Baden Teague (Liberal)	Amanda Vanstone (Liberal)	John Coulter (Democrat)
1993–1996	1995	Chris Schacht (Labor)	Rosemary Crowley (Labor)	Nick Minchin (Liberal)	Robert Hill (Liberal)	Dominic Foreman (Labor)	Alan Ferguson (Liberal)	Meg Lees (Democrat/ Independent/ Progressive Alliance)	Nick Bolkus (Labor)	Grant Chapman (Liberal)	Baden Teague (Liberal)	Amanda Vanstone (Liberal)	Natasha Stott Despoja (Democrat)
1996–1999	1996	Chris Schacht (Labor)	Rosemary Crowley (Labor)	Nick Minchin (Liberal)	Robert Hill (Liberal)	Dominic Foreman (Labor)	Alan Ferguson (Liberal)	Meg Lees (Democrat/ Independent/ Progressive Alliance)	Nick Bolkus (Labor)	Grant Chapman (Liberal)	Jeannie Ferris (Liberal)	Amanda Vanstone (Liberal)	Natasha Stott Despoja (Democrat)
1996–1999	12 July 1996	Chris Schacht (Labor)	Rosemary Crowley (Labor)	Nick Minchin (Liberal)	Robert Hill (Liberal)	Dominic Foreman (Labor)	Alan Ferguson (Liberal)	Meg Lees (Democrat/ Independent/ Progressive Alliance)	Nick Bolkus (Labor)	Grant Chapman (Liberal)	Vacant	Amanda Vanstone (Liberal)	Natasha Stott Despoja (Democrat)
1996–1999	24 July 1996	Chris Schacht (Labor)	Rosemary Crowley (Labor)	Nick Minchin (Liberal)	Robert Hill (Liberal)	Dominic Foreman (Labor)	Alan Ferguson (Liberal)	Meg Lees (Democrat/ Independent/ Progressive Alliance)	Nick Bolkus (Labor)	Grant Chapman (Liberal)	Jeannie Ferris (Liberal)	Amanda Vanstone (Liberal)	Natasha Stott Despoja (Democrat)
1996–1999	1997	Chris Schacht (Labor)	Rosemary Crowley (Labor)	Nick Minchin (Liberal)	Robert Hill (Liberal)	John Quirke (Labor)	Alan Ferguson (Liberal)	Meg Lees (Democrat/ Independent/ Progressive Alliance)	Nick Bolkus (Labor)	Grant Chapman (Liberal)	Jeannie Ferris (Liberal)	Amanda Vanstone (Liberal)	Natasha Stott Despoja (Democrat)
1999–2002	1998	Chris Schacht (Labor)	Rosemary Crowley (Labor)	Nick Minchin (Liberal)	Robert Hill (Liberal)	John Quirke (Labor)	Alan Ferguson (Liberal)	Meg Lees (Democrat/ Independent/ Progressive Alliance)	Nick Bolkus (Labor)	Grant Chapman (Liberal)	Jeannie Ferris (Liberal)	Amanda Vanstone (Liberal)	Natasha Stott Despoja (Democrat)
1999–2002	2000	Chris Schacht (Labor)	Rosemary Crowley (Labor)	Nick Minchin (Liberal)	Robert Hill (Liberal)	Geoff Buckland (Labor)	Alan Ferguson (Liberal)	Meg Lees (Democrat/ Independent/ Progressive Alliance)	Nick Bolkus (Labor)	Grant Chapman (Liberal)	Jeannie Ferris (Liberal)	Amanda Vanstone (Liberal)	Natasha Stott Despoja (Democrat)
2002–2005	2001	Penny Wong (Labor)	Linda Kirk (Labor)	Nick Minchin (Liberal)	Robert Hill (Liberal)	Geoff Buckland (Labor)	Alan Ferguson (Liberal)	Meg Lees (Democrat/ Independent/ Progressive Alliance)	Nick Bolkus (Labor)	Grant Chapman (Liberal)	Jeannie Ferris (Liberal)	Amanda Vanstone (Liberal)	Natasha Stott Despoja (Democrat)
2002–2005	2002	Penny Wong (Labor)	Linda Kirk (Labor)	Nick Minchin (Liberal)	Robert Hill (Liberal)	Geoff Buckland (Labor)	Alan Ferguson (Liberal)	Meg Lees (Democrat/ Independent/ Progressive Alliance)	Nick Bolkus (Labor)	Grant Chapman (Liberal)	Jeannie Ferris (Liberal)	Amanda Vanstone (Liberal)	Natasha Stott Despoja (Democrat)
2002–2005	2003	Penny Wong (Labor)	Linda Kirk (Labor)	Nick Minchin (Liberal)	Robert Hill (Liberal)	Geoff Buckland (Labor)	Alan Ferguson (Liberal)	Meg Lees (Democrat/ Independent/ Progressive Alliance)	Nick Bolkus (Labor)	Grant Chapman (Liberal)	Jeannie Ferris (Liberal)	Amanda Vanstone (Liberal)	Natasha Stott Despoja (Democrat)
2005–2008	2004	Penny Wong (Labor)	Linda Kirk (Labor)	Nick Minchin (Liberal)	Robert Hill (Liberal)	Anne McEwen (Labor)	Alan Ferguson (Liberal)	Annette Hurley (Labor)	Dana Wortley (Labor)	Grant Chapman (Liberal)	Jeannie Ferris (Liberal)	Amanda Vanstone (Liberal)	Natasha Stott Despoja (Democrat)
2005–2008	2006	Penny Wong (Labor)	Linda Kirk (Labor)	Nick Minchin (Liberal)	Cory Bernardi (Liberal/ Conservative/ Independent)	Anne McEwen (Labor)	Alan Ferguson (Liberal)	Annette Hurley (Labor)	Dana Wortley (Labor)	Grant Chapman (Liberal)	Jeannie Ferris (Liberal)	Amanda Vanstone (Liberal)	Natasha Stott Despoja (Democrat)
2005–2008	2007	Penny Wong (Labor)	Linda Kirk (Labor)	Nick Minchin (Liberal)	Cory Bernardi (Liberal/ Conservative/ Independent)	Anne McEwen (Labor)	Alan Ferguson (Liberal)	Annette Hurley (Labor)	Dana Wortley (Labor)	Grant Chapman (Liberal)	Simon Birmingham (Liberal)	Mary Jo Fisher (Liberal)	Natasha Stott Despoja (Democrat)
2008–2011	2007	Penny Wong (Labor)	Don Farrell (Labor)	Nick Minchin (Liberal)	Cory Bernardi (Liberal/ Conservative/ Independent)	Anne McEwen (Labor)	Alan Ferguson (Liberal)	Annette Hurley (Labor)	Dana Wortley (Labor)	Nick Xenophon (Independent /Xenophon)	Simon Birmingham (Liberal)	Mary Jo Fisher (Liberal)	Sarah Hanson-Young (Greens)
2011–2014	2010	Penny Wong (Labor)	Don Farrell (Labor)	Sean Edwards (Liberal)	Cory Bernardi (Liberal/ Conservative/ Independent)	Anne McEwen (Labor)	David Fawcett (Liberal)	Alex Gallacher (Labor)	Penny Wright (Greens)	Nick Xenophon (Independent /Xenophon)	Simon Birmingham (Liberal)	Mary Jo Fisher (Liberal)	Sarah Hanson-Young (Greens)
2011–2014	2012	Penny Wong (Labor)	Don Farrell (Labor)	Sean Edwards (Liberal)	Cory Bernardi (Liberal/ Conservative/ Independent)	Anne McEwen (Labor)	David Fawcett (Liberal)	Alex Gallacher (Labor)	Penny Wright (Greens)	Nick Xenophon (Independent /Xenophon)	Simon Birmingham (Liberal)	Anne Ruston (Liberal)	Sarah Hanson-Young (Greens)
2011–2014	2013	Penny Wong (Labor)	Don Farrell (Labor)	Sean Edwards (Liberal)	Cory Bernardi (Liberal/ Conservative/ Independent)	Anne McEwen (Labor)	David Fawcett (Liberal)	Alex Gallacher (Labor)	Penny Wright (Greens)	Nick Xenophon (Independent /Xenophon)	Simon Birmingham (Liberal)	Anne Ruston (Liberal)	Sarah Hanson-Young (Greens)
2014–2016	2013	Penny Wong (Labor)	Bob Day (Family First)	Sean Edwards (Liberal)	Cory Bernardi (Liberal/ Conservative/ Independent)	Anne McEwen (Labor)	David Fawcett (Liberal)	Alex Gallacher (Labor)	Penny Wright (Greens)	Nick Xenophon (Independent /Xenophon)	Simon Birmingham (Liberal)	Anne Ruston (Liberal)	Sarah Hanson-Young (Greens)
2014–2016	2015	Penny Wong (Labor)	Bob Day (Family First)	Sean Edwards (Liberal)	Cory Bernardi (Liberal/ Conservative/ Independent)	Anne McEwen (Labor)	David Fawcett (Liberal)	Alex Gallacher (Labor)	Robert Simms (Greens)	Nick Xenophon (Independent /Xenophon)	Simon Birmingham (Liberal)	Anne Ruston (Liberal)	Sarah Hanson-Young (Greens)
2016–2019	2016	Penny Wong (Labor)	Bob Day (Family First)	Skye Kakoschke-Moore (Xenophon)	Cory Bernardi (Liberal/ Conservative/ Independent)	Don Farrell (Labor)	David Fawcett (Liberal)	Alex Gallacher (Labor)	Stirling Griff (Xenophon)	Nick Xenophon (Independent /Xenophon)	Simon Birmingham (Liberal)	Anne Ruston (Liberal)	Sarah Hanson-Young (Greens)
2016–2019	2017	Penny Wong (Labor)	Lucy Gichuhi (Independent /Liberal)	Skye Kakoschke-Moore (Xenophon)	Cory Bernardi (Liberal/ Conservative/ Independent)	Don Farrell (Labor)	David Fawcett (Liberal)	Alex Gallacher (Labor)	Stirling Griff (Xenophon)	Rex Patrick (Xenophon/ Independent/ Rex Patrick Team)	Simon Birmingham (Liberal)	Anne Ruston (Liberal)	Sarah Hanson-Young (Greens)
2016–2019	2018	Penny Wong (Labor)	Lucy Gichuhi (Independent /Liberal)	Tim Storer (Independent)	Cory Bernardi (Liberal/ Conservative/ Independent)	Don Farrell (Labor)	David Fawcett (Liberal)	Alex Gallacher (Labor)	Stirling Griff (Xenophon)	Rex Patrick (Xenophon/ Independent/ Rex Patrick Team)	Simon Birmingham (Liberal)	Anne Ruston (Liberal)	Sarah Hanson-Young (Greens)
2019–2022	2019	Penny Wong (Labor)	Alex Antic (Liberal)	Marielle Smith (Labor)	Cory Bernardi (Liberal/ Conservative/ Independent)	Don Farrell (Labor)	David Fawcett (Liberal)	Alex Gallacher (Labor)	Stirling Griff (Xenophon)	Rex Patrick (Xenophon/ Independent/ Rex Patrick Team)	Simon Birmingham (Liberal)	Anne Ruston (Liberal)	Sarah Hanson-Young (Greens)
2019–2022	2019	Penny Wong (Labor)	Alex Antic (Liberal)	Marielle Smith (Labor)	Cory Bernardi (Liberal/ Conservative/ Independent)	Don Farrell (Labor)	David Fawcett (Liberal)	Alex Gallacher (Labor)	Stirling Griff (Xenophon)	Rex Patrick (Xenophon/ Independent/ Rex Patrick Team)	Simon Birmingham (Liberal)	Anne Ruston (Liberal)	Sarah Hanson-Young (Greens)
2019–2022	2020	Penny Wong (Labor)	Alex Antic (Liberal)	Marielle Smith (Labor)	Andrew McLachlan (Liberal)	Don Farrell (Labor)	David Fawcett (Liberal)	Alex Gallacher (Labor)	Stirling Griff (Xenophon)	Rex Patrick (Xenophon/ Independent/ Rex Patrick Team)	Simon Birmingham (Liberal)	Anne Ruston (Liberal)	Sarah Hanson-Young (Greens)
2019–2022	2021	Penny Wong (Labor)	Alex Antic (Liberal)	Marielle Smith (Labor)	Andrew McLachlan (Liberal)	Don Farrell (Labor)	David Fawcett (Liberal)	Karen Grogan (Labor)	Stirling Griff (Xenophon)	Rex Patrick (Xenophon/ Independent/ Rex Patrick Team)	Simon Birmingham (Liberal)	Anne Ruston (Liberal)	Sarah Hanson-Young (Greens)
2022–2025	2022	Penny Wong (Labor)	Alex Antic (Liberal)	Marielle Smith (Labor)	Andrew McLachlan (Liberal)	Don Farrell (Labor)	David Fawcett (Liberal)	Karen Grogan (Labor)	Barbara Pocock (Greens)	Kerrynne Liddle (Liberal)	Simon Birmingham (Liberal)	Anne Ruston (Liberal)	Sarah Hanson-Young (Greens)
2022–2025	2025	Penny Wong (Labor)	Alex Antic (Liberal)	Marielle Smith (Labor)	Andrew McLachlan (Liberal)	Don Farrell (Labor)	David Fawcett (Liberal)	Karen Grogan (Labor)	Barbara Pocock (Greens)	Kerrynne Liddle (Liberal)	Leah Blyth (Liberal)	Anne Ruston (Liberal)	Sarah Hanson-Young (Greens)
2025–2028	2025	Penny Wong (Labor)	Alex Antic (Liberal)	Marielle Smith (Labor)	Andrew McLachlan (Liberal)	Don Farrell (Labor)	Charlotte Walker (Labor)	Karen Grogan (Labor)	Barbara Pocock (Greens)	Kerrynne Liddle (Liberal)	Leah Blyth (Liberal)	Anne Ruston (Liberal)	Sarah Hanson-Young (Greens)

== See also ==
- Electoral results for the Australian Senate in South Australia
