= Electoral results for the district of Tea Tree Gully =

South Australian district election results

This is a list of election results for the electoral district of Tea Tree Gully in South Australian elections.

== Members for Tea Tree Gully ==
Member	Party	Term
Molly Byrne	Labor	1970–1977

== Election results ==
=== Elections in the 1970s ===
1975 South Australian state election: Tea Tree Gully
Party	Candidate	Votes	%	±%
Labor	Molly Byrne	15,331	54.2	−8.0
Liberal	Robert Sloane	6,521	23.0	−11.0
Liberal Movement	John Hincksman	6,162	21.8	+21.8
Independent	Emily Perry	177	0.6	+0.6
National	Barry Leaver	120	0.4	+0.4
Total formal votes		28,311	97.3	−0.2
Informal votes		794	2.7	+0.2
Turnout		29,105	94.6	0.0
Two-party-preferred result
Labor	Molly Byrne	16,219	57.3	−6.8
Liberal	Robert Sloane	12,092	42.7	+6.8
Labor hold		Swing	−6.8	

1973 South Australian state election: Tea Tree Gully
Party	Candidate	Votes	%	±%
Labor	Molly Byrne	13,525	62.2	+2.8
Liberal and Country	William Brassington	7,382	34.0	−6.0
Independent	Leo Davis	829	3.8	+3.8
Total formal votes		21,736	97.5	+0.6
Informal votes		566	2.5	−0.6
Turnout		22,302	94.6	−0.9
Two-party-preferred result
Labor	Molly Byrne	13,940	64.1	+4.7
Liberal and Country	William Brassington	7,796	35.9	−4.7
Labor hold		Swing	+4.7	

1970 South Australian state election: Tea Tree Gully
Party	Candidate	Votes	%	±%
Labor	Molly Byrne	9,291	59.4	
Liberal and Country	William Brassington	6,348	40.6	
Total formal votes		15,639	98.1	
Informal votes		302	1.9	
Turnout		15,941	95.5	
Labor hold		Swing		
