= Electoral results for the district of Wright =

South Australian district election results

This is a list of electoral results for the Electoral district of Wright in South Australian state elections.

== Members for Wright ==
Member	Party	Term
Scott Ashenden	Liberal	1993–1997
Jennifer Rankine	Labor	1997–2018
Blair Boyer	Labor	2018–present

== Election results ==
=== Elections in the 2020s ===
==== 2026 ====
2026 South Australian state election: Wright
Party	Candidate	Votes	%	±%
Labor	Blair Boyer	11,939	48.1	−3.7
One Nation	Sean Porter	7,062	28.5	+28.5
Liberal	Carston Woodhouse (disendorsed)	2,170	8.8	−23.2
Greens	Samantha Skinner	2,145	8.6	+0.3
Family First	Sue Nancarrow	672	2.7	−4.5
Animal Justice	Deb Horley	373	1.5	+1.5
Australian Family	Robin Hill	352	1.4	+1.4
United Voice	Rosalind Wilton	107	0.4	+0.4
Total formal votes		24,820	95.8	−1.4
Informal votes		1,079	4.2	+1.4
Turnout		25,899	90.6	−0.1
Two-candidate-preferred result
Labor	Blair Boyer	15,512	62.5	+0.6
One Nation	Sean Porter	9,308	37.5	+37.5
Labor hold		Swing	+0.6	

==== 2022 ====
2022 South Australian state election: Wright
Party	Candidate	Votes	%	±%
Labor	Blair Boyer	12,231	52.0	+14.1
Liberal	Graham Reynolds	7,550	32.1	+1.0
Greens	Alexandra McGee	2,001	8.5	+2.7
Family First	Kym Nancarrow	1,737	7.4	+7.4
Total formal votes		23,519	97.2	
Informal votes		670	2.8	
Turnout		24,189	90.7	
Two-party-preferred result
Labor	Blair Boyer	14,548	61.9	+8.8
Liberal	Graham Reynolds	8,971	38.1	−8.8
Labor hold		Swing	+8.8	

Distribution of preferences: Wright
Party	Candidate	Votes	Round 1		Round 2	
Party	Candidate	Votes	Dist.	Total	Dist.	Total
Quota (50% + 1)		11,760				
Labor	Blair Boyer	12,231	+398	12,629	+1,919	14,548
Liberal	Graham Reynolds	7,550	+859	8,409	+562	8,971
Greens	Alexandra McGee	2,001	+480	2,481	Excluded	
Family First	Kym Nancarrow	1,737	Excluded			

=== Elections in the 2010s ===
==== 2018 ====
2018 South Australian state election: Wright
Party	Candidate	Votes	%	±%
Labor	Blair Boyer	9,449	39.6	−5.1
Liberal	Luigi Mesisca	7,407	31.0	−7.1
SA-Best	Natasha Henningsen	4,437	18.6	+18.6
Greens	Jennifer Harness	1,412	5.9	−1.2
Conservatives	Eric Dennis	1,153	4.8	−3.6
Total formal votes		23,858	95.9	−0.3
Informal votes		1,024	4.1	+0.3
Turnout		24,882	92.2	+4.0
Two-party-preferred result
Labor	Blair Boyer	12,767	53.5	−0.8
Liberal	Luigi Mesisca	11,091	46.5	+0.8
Labor hold		Swing	−0.8	

2014 South Australian state election: Wright
Party	Candidate	Votes	%	±%
Labor	Jennifer Rankine	9,838	43.6	−4.6
Liberal	Lyn Petrie	8,685	38.5	+1.2
Family First	Mark Potter	1,904	8.4	+1.7
Greens	Tom Lowe	1,441	6.4	+1.0
Independent	Danyse Soester	696	3.1	+3.1
Total formal votes		22,564	96.3	−0.6
Informal votes		856	3.7	+0.6
Turnout		23,420	93.8	−0.0
Two-party-preferred result
Labor	Jennifer Rankine	11,965	53.0	−1.8
Liberal	Lyn Petrie	10,599	47.0	+1.8
Labor hold		Swing	−1.8	

2010 South Australian state election: Wright
Party	Candidate	Votes	%	±%
Labor	Jennifer Rankine	10,688	48.1	−9.4
Liberal	Tina Celeste	8,309	37.4	+10.7
Family First	Mark Potter	1,488	6.7	−0.6
Greens	Arthur Seager	1,132	5.1	+1.2
Dignity for Disability	Garry Connor	581	2.6	+0.2
Total formal votes		22,198	93.9	
Informal votes		1,283	6.1	
Turnout		23,481	96.2	
Two-party-preferred result
Labor	Jennifer Rankine	12,126	54.6	−10.7
Liberal	Tina Celeste	10,072	45.4	+10.7
Labor hold		Swing	−10.7	

=== Elections in the 2000s ===
2006 South Australian state election: Wright
Party	Candidate	Votes	%	±%
Labor	Jennifer Rankine	12,080	57.6	+12.6
Liberal	Stephen Ernst	5,605	26.7	−11.6
Family First	Malcolm Reynolds	1,541	7.3	+0.1
Greens	Holden Ward	817	3.9	+3.9
Dignity for Disabled	Sarah Rischmueller	506	2.4	+2.4
Democrats	Scott Jesser	428	2.0	−5.3
Total formal votes		20,977	96.1	−1.7
Informal votes		855	3.9	+1.7
Turnout		21,832	93.7	−0.9
Two-party-preferred result
Labor	Jennifer Rankine	13,694	65.3	+12.1
Liberal	Stephen Ernst	7,283	34.7	−12.1
Labor hold		Swing	+12.1	

2002 South Australian state election: Wright
Party	Candidate	Votes	%	±%
Labor	Jennifer Rankine	9,676	45.0	+1.9
Liberal	Mark Osterstock	8,243	38.3	+2.4
Democrats	Helen Munro	1,567	7.3	−6.7
Family First	Lyn Griffin	1,541	7.2	+7.2
One Nation	Rod Kowald	487	2.3	+2.3
Total formal votes		21,514	97.8	
Informal votes		494	2.2	
Turnout		22,008	94.6	
Two-party-preferred result
Labor	Jennifer Rankine	11,438	53.2	−1.2
Liberal	Mark Osterstock	10,076	46.8	+1.2
Labor hold		Swing	−1.2	

=== Elections in the 1990s ===
1997 South Australian state election: Wright
Party	Candidate	Votes	%	±%
Labor	Jennifer Rankine	8,076	41.4	+1.0
Liberal	Scott Ashenden	7,175	36.8	−11.9
Democrats	Christine Posta	2,604	13.4	+5.3
Independent	John Siemers	826	4.2	+4.2
Independent	Gregg McDonald	524	2.7	+2.7
United Australia	Olive Weston	299	1.5	+1.5
Total formal votes		19,504	95.4	−1.9
Informal votes		933	4.6	+1.9
Turnout		20,437	92.6	
Two-party-preferred result
Labor	Jennifer Rankine	10,354	53.1	+6.4
Liberal	Scott Ashenden	9,150	46.9	−6.4
Labor gain from Liberal		Swing	+6.4	

1993 South Australian state election: Wright
Party	Candidate	Votes	%	±%
Liberal	Scott Ashenden	10,510	49.8	+11.7
Labor	Trish White	8,298	39.3	−9.6
Democrats	Stephen Bartholomew	1,675	7.9	−2.0
Independent	Ronald Fox	612	2.9	+2.9
Total formal votes		21,095	97.4	−0.3
Informal votes		556	2.6	+0.3
Turnout		21,651	95.0	
Two-party-preferred result
Liberal	Scott Ashenden	11,401	54.0	+9.2
Labor	Trish White	9,694	46.0	−9.2
Liberal gain from Labor		Swing	+9.2	
