= 1994 Torrens state by-election =

The 1994 Torrens state by-election was a by-election held on 7 May 1994 for the South Australian House of Assembly seat of Torrens, centred in the inner north-eastern suburbs of Adelaide. This was triggered by the death of Liberal MHA Joe Tiernan on 31 March 1994, only four months after winning the seat at its first contest in the 1993 state election on a two-party vote of 56.22 percent.

== Timeline ==
31 March 1994

Tiernan died, vacating the seat of Torrens.

10 April 1994

Writ of election issued by Speaker of the House of Assembly.

22 April 1994, at noon

Close of nominations and ballot paper order draw conducted.

7 May 1994

Polling day, between the hours of 8am and 6pm.

== Results ==
The Democrats, Call to Australia, and Natural Law, who contested the previous election and gained 9.7 percent, 2.6 percent, and 1.9 percent respectively, did not contest the by-election. Labor won the seat from the Liberals.

Torrens by-election, 7 May 1994
Party	Candidate	Votes	%	±%
Labor	Robyn Geraghty	8,261	47.14	+11.66
Liberal	Stephen Ernst	7,785	44.42	−3.98
HEMP	Dave Sag	459	2.62	+2.62
Independent (No Mining in National Parks)	Scott Wilson	336	1.92	+1.92
Grey Power	William Patrick	224	1.28	+1.28
Independent (Christians for Law and Order)	Robert Payne	214	1.22	+1.22
Independent	Bernhard Cotton	166	0.95	+0.95
Independent (Smokers' Rights)	Dorothy Bremert	79	0.45	+0.45
Total formal votes		17,524	95.78	−0.10
Informal votes		773	4.22	+0.10
Turnout		18,297	85.34	−8.89
Two-party-preferred result
Labor	Robyn Geraghty	9,185	52.41	+8.63
Liberal	Stephen Ernst	8,339	47.59	−8.63
Labor gain from Liberal		Swing	+8.63	

== See also ==
- List of South Australian state by-elections
