= Nancy Buttfield =

Australian politician

Dame Nancy Buttfield DBE
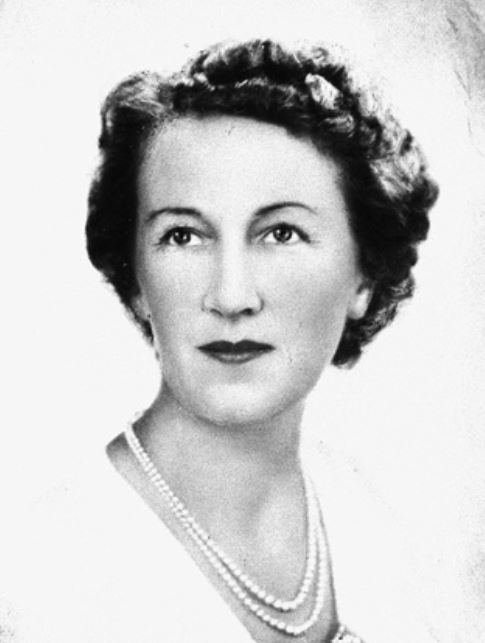

Senator for South Australia
- In office 1 July 1968 – 11 April 1974
- In office 9 December 1961 – 30 June 1965
- Preceded by: Gordon Davidson
- In office 11 October 1955 – 8 December 1961
- Preceded by: George McLeay
- Succeeded by: Gordon Davidson

Personal details
- Born: Nancy Eileen Holden; 12 November 1912 Kensington Gardens, Adelaide, South Australia
- Died: 4 September 2005 (aged 92) Adelaide, South Australia
- Party: Liberal
- Spouse: Frank Buttfield (m. 1936; died 1998)

Dame Nancy Eileen Buttfield, DBE (née Holden; 12 November 1912 – 4 September 2005) was an Australian Senator and the first woman to serve in the Australian Parliament as a representative of the state of South Australia.

== Early life ==
Buttfield was born on 12 November 1912 in Kensington Gardens, South Australia. She was the daughter of Hilda May (née Lavis) and Edward Holden. Her father, who was knighted in 1946, was the co-founder of the automobile marque Holden, which had its origins in a saddlery established by his grandfather James Holden. He was elected to the South Australian Legislative Council in 1935. She was educated at Girton House Girls' Grammar School (1918–1923) and Woodlands Glenelg Church of England Girls' Grammar School (1924–1929). She was a school prefect and house captain in her final year. She subsequently attended a finishing school in Paris for a year and then studied psychology, music, logic and economics at the University of Adelaide. She was a member of a predominantly male model parliament, eschewing the women's model parliament.

Prior to entering politics, Buttfield was a housewife who was involved with a number of charitable causes, considering herself a "professional fundraiser". These included the Queen Victoria Maternity Hospital, the Mothers' and Babies' Health Association, and the Australian Comforts Fund, established to support soldiers during World War II. In 1946, she and Esther Lipman helped establish the Emergency Maternity Hospital at Mile End, of which she became the co-manager.

== Politics ==
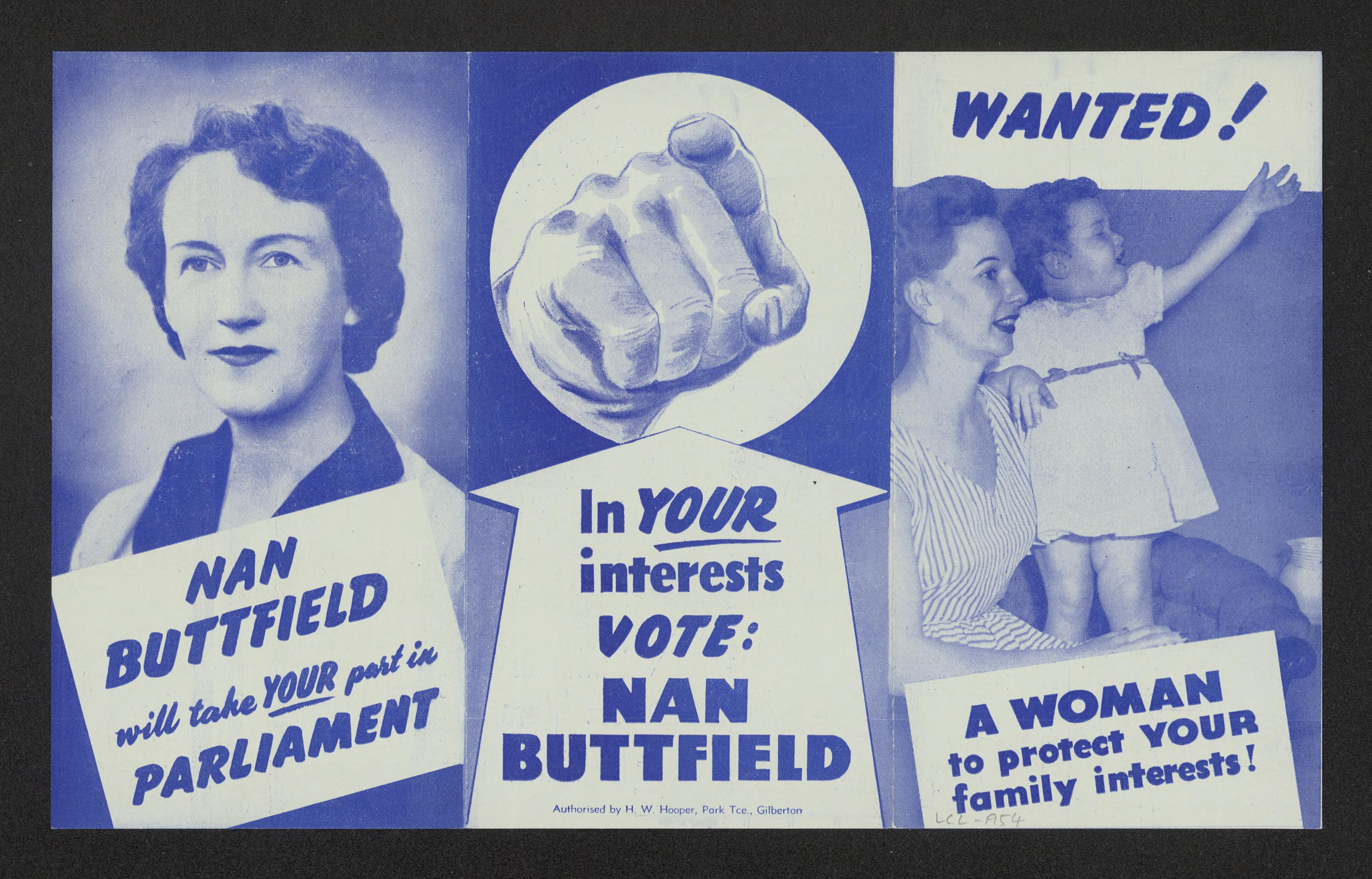
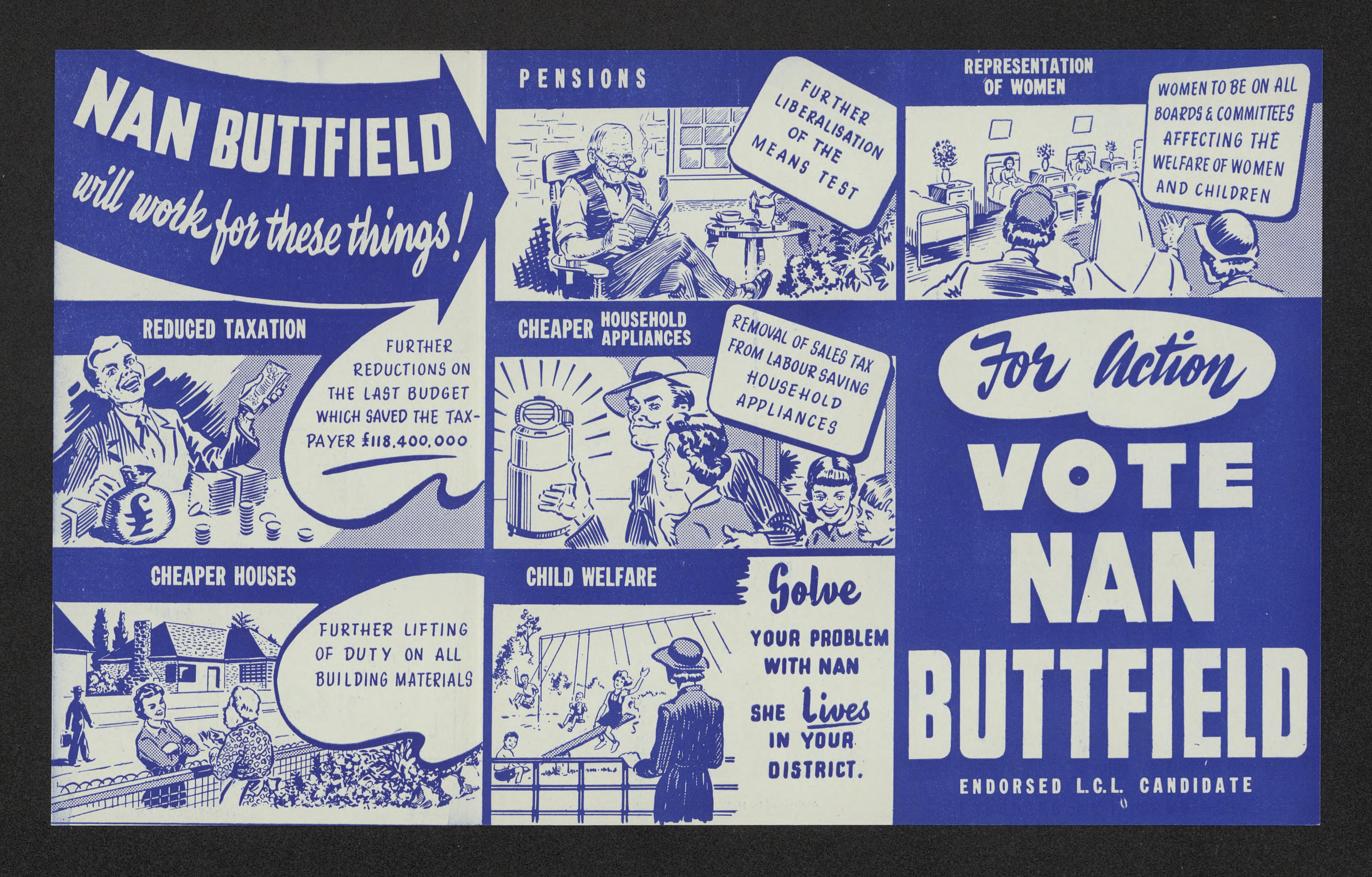
Campaign material used by Buttfield at the 1954 federal election

Buttfield first entered the Senate on 11 October 1955, having been chosen by the Parliament of South Australia, under Section 15 of the Australian Constitution, to replace Senator George McLeay, who had died the previous month.

She was elected in her own right in the 1955 general election. On 8 December 1961, she resigned her seat in the Senate, with her term set to expire on 30 June 1962. The resignation was only in order to contest the casual vacancy caused by the death of Rex Pearson, in the 1961 election the next day. Gordon Davidson had been appointed by the South Australian parliament to replace Pearson but did not contest the casual vacancy. Buttfield won the election for casual vacancy and served for the remainder of Pearson's term, due to expire in 1965. Buttfield's vacancy was filled by Davidson, who was appointed on 8 February 1962, for the remaining four months of the term.

Even though her parliamentary service was continuous, she was the first woman member of the Australian parliament to resign. She remained in the Senate until 30 June 1965, having lost her seat at the 1964 Senate election. She was re-elected in 1967, her new term commencing on 1 July 1968. When a federal election was called on 11 April 1974, both houses were dissolved in a double dissolution and she chose to retire, having served a total of sixteen and a half years. She was the last surviving member of the 1955–1956 Senate.

Buttfield was known for her advocacy of women's rights. It is said that, with the encouragement of the then prime minister, Sir Robert Menzies, she broke down a long-established convention in Old Parliament House by becoming the first woman to drink at the previously male-only Members' Bar.

== Personal life ==
Buttfield had two sons with her auctioneer husband Frank Charles Buttfield, whom she married in 1936. Her son Andrew was an unsuccessful candidate of the Workers Party at the 1975 federal election. After leaving the Senate she retired to a farm at Chain of Ponds; while the house was under construction she and her husband lived in disused railway carriages. Buttfield was widowed in 1998 and died in Adelaide on 4 September 2005, aged 92.

=== Honours ===
Buttfield was appointed a Dame Commander of the Order of the British Empire (DBE) in the 1972 New Year Honours.

== Sources ==
- Profile of Dame Nancy Buttfield
