= Tom Kenyon =

Australian politician

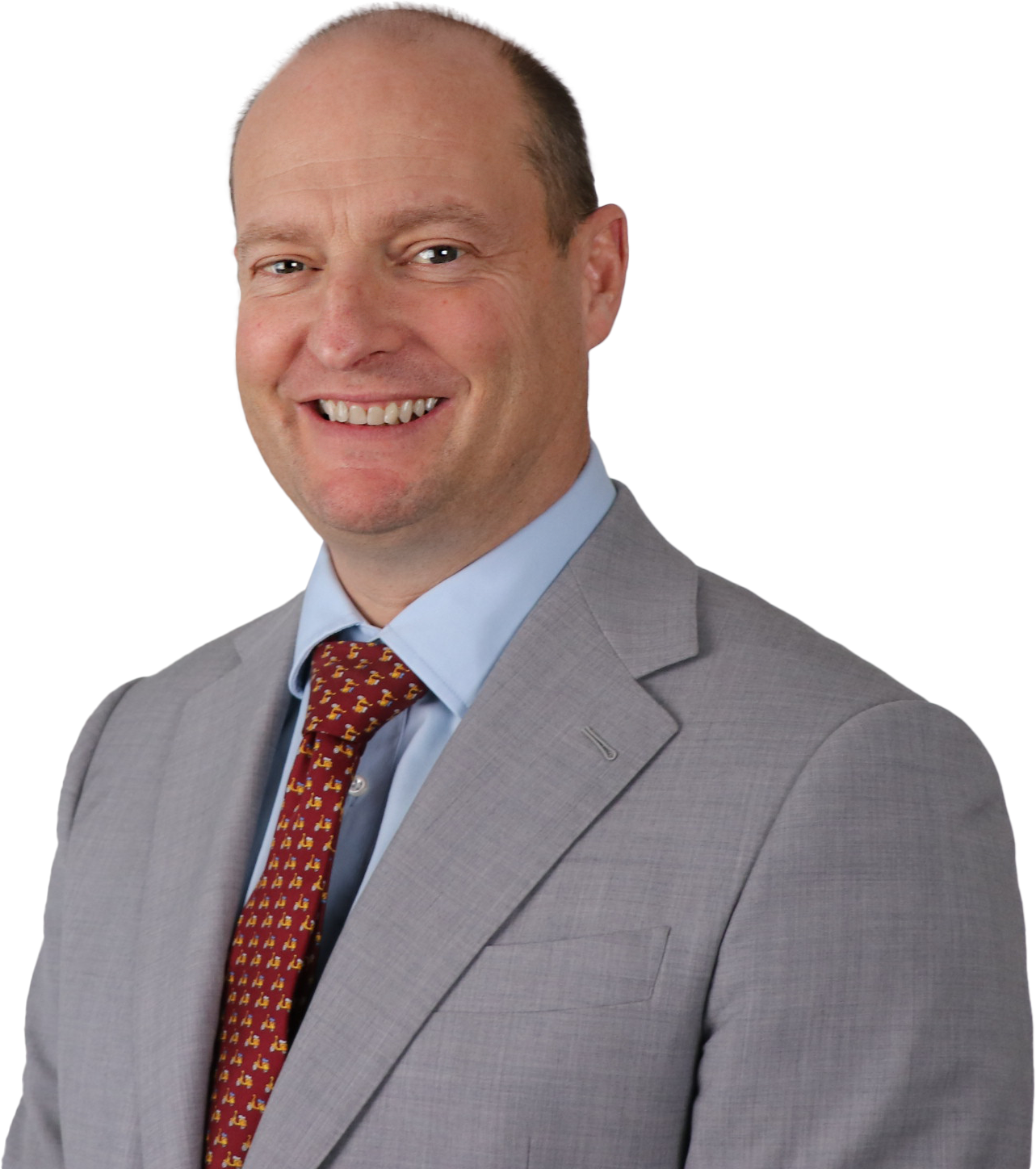
Tom Kenyon MP Tom Kenyon Headshot

Member of the South Australian House of Assembly for Newland
- In office 18 March 2006 – 17 March 2018
- Preceded by: Dorothy Kotz
- Succeeded by: Richard Harvey

Personal details
- Born: Thomas Richard Kenyon; 26 February 1972 (age 54) Adelaide, South Australia, Australia
- Party: Family First (since 2021)
- Other political affiliations: Labor (1997–2021)

Thomas Richard Kenyon (born 26 February 1972) is a former Australian politician who represented the South Australian House of Assembly seat of Newland for the Labor Party from the 2006 election until his defeat in 2018. Kenyon left the Labor Party in 2021 to found the Family First Party.

== Early life ==
Kenyon was raised in Gawler and Adelaide. He was educated at Saint Ignatius College, South Australia and studied Asian Studies at Flinders University. He subsequently completed a Bachelor of Applied Science in Environmental Management at the University of South Australia. After working in a number of positions, including as a jackaroo and union organiser, Kenyon was employed as an advisor to Minister for Mineral Resources and Development Paul Holloway, a position which he held until his election to parliament. Kenyon is linked with the Shop, Distributive and Allied Employees Association (SDA).

== Parliament ==
Kenyon made his first bid for parliament in his early 20s, as the Labor candidate in the safe Liberal state seat of Heysen at the 1997 state election, achieving a 12.3-point two-party swing.

Kenyon was endorsed unopposed as the party's candidate for the electorate of Newland at the 2006 state election, where veteran Liberal MP Dorothy Kotz was retiring. He singled out increasing the use of public transport and addressing youth employment as priorities, and there was some media speculation that his status as a young, relatively conservative father of three would be well-supported in the area of Adelaide known as the "Bible Belt". To this extent, polls as early as 2005 began showing that Kenyon was in with a real chance of winning the seat, although Kotz had previously held the seat by a fair margin. There was ultimately a landslide result across the city on election day, and he achieved a 12.5-point two-party swing to finish with a 56.8 percent two-party vote, polling more than double the required swing needed to take the seat, claiming victory after only 90 minutes of counting.

Kenyon was on the right of the Labor Party, with links to the rightwing Shop, Distributive and Allied Employees Association. He was the only Labor member to state that he would vote against the planned Relationships Bill removing discrimination against gay couples if a conscience vote were granted – although in the end he voted for the revised Domestic Partners Bill in 2006. Kenyon used his maiden South Australian House of Assembly speech to criticise the SA Greens environmental credentials, stating that he did not believe South Australia should accept nuclear waste from other countries, and that burial of waste materials would be a suitable option. His maiden speech was also used to speak out against abortion.

Kenyon was appointed as Minister for Manufacturing, Innovation and Trade, Minister for Small Business as well as becoming a Member of Executive Council.

Kenyon suffered a 4.6-point two-party swing to finish with a 52.2 percent two-party vote at the 2010 state election in Newland. At the 2014 state election, Kenyon's seat became Labor's most marginal on a 51.4 percent two-party vote from a 1.2-point swing.

Kenyon quit cabinet following the 2014 election stating he wanted to spend more time with his family.

On 28 July 2021, alongside former minister Jack Snelling, Kenyon founded the Family First Party.

== Nuclear industrial advocacy ==
Since his election, Kenyon successfully advocated within the Labor party for the expansion of uranium mining with Paul Holloway, including the abandonment of the Three-Mine Policy. In 2007, his advocacy extended beyond uranium mining to the nuclear fuel cycle generally. In an Opinion Editorial for The Australian he wrote: "It's time we in the ALP gave up pretending that nuclear energy is Satan's power supply of choice... It's time we stopped repeating the myth that waste is an issue that can't be dealt with."

Since that time he has also advocated for the consideration of an expanded nuclear industry in South Australia. In 2015, the Weatherill government initiated the Nuclear Fuel Cycle Royal Commission. While the commission was undertaking its work, Kenyon became a public advocate for the importation of spent nuclear fuel to South Australia for storage and disposal. He expressed his belief that the funds raised by such an activity could fund major public infrastructure projects and advance the South Australian economy. Kenyon spoke on the subject at various events, to the media and demonstrated the potential for bi-partisan support in a public meeting with Liberal party senator, Sean Edwards in which he applauded Edwards' submission to the Royal Commission. He noted that Edwards proposition went beyond his own by introducing the potential reprocessing of spent nuclear fuel to generate electricity using advanced nuclear reactors.

In a 2016 opinion editorial published in The Advertiser, Kenyon wrote that he had been exploring the potential economic benefits of nuclear waste importation since learning that Taiwan had established a $9bn fund to dispense of their spent nuclear fuel while on a delegation there in 2006.

== Personal life ==
Kenyon is a devout Catholic. He is married with three children.

South Australian House of Assembly
Preceded by Dorothy Kotz	Member for Newland; 2006–2018	Succeeded by Richard Harvey
