= Glenn Docherty =

3rd incumbent mayor of the City of Playford

His Worship Glenn Docherty Mayor

Mayor City of Playford
- Incumbent
- Assumed office 23 November 2010

Deputy Mayor City of Playford
- In office 21 November 2006 – 23 November 2010

Councillor, Ward Six, City of Playford
- In office May 2003 – 23 November 2010

Personal details
- Born: 1983 (age 42–43) Elizabeth, Adelaide, Australia
- Education: University of South Australia
- Occupation: Registered nurse
- Website: www.playford.sa.gov.au

Glenn Brian Docherty (born 1983) is the third Mayor of the City of Playford in South Australia. He became mayor following the 2010 mayoral election. Docherty is, to date, the youngest mayor of Playford.

Docherty unsuccessfully contested the South Australian House of Assembly seat of Newland for the Liberal Party at the 2014 state election.

== Council ==
At the age of 19, Glenn Docherty was first elected to Playford Council in 2003 as one of two councillors for Ward Six. He was re-elected for a second term in 2006, and became deputy mayor, a position he held until nominating for the 2010 mayoral election. During his time as a Deputy Mayor/Councillor he had been a champion of a number of causes, the most notable being the creation of the Playford Health Precinct around the Lyell McEwin Hospital.

During the mayoral election campaign, Docherty focussed on city presentation, building a health precinct and building better infrastructure for the community.

In the months following his election, Docherty was prominent in the South Australian and Australian Press with announcements and interviews regarding his keen interest on expanding employment opportunities in Playford, promoting the new SCT Rail Terminal, and promoting a study into the potential renewal of the suburbs of Elizabeth. Docherty also aims to make Elizabeth the second CBD of Adelaide. In February 2014, the council under his leadership released an expression of interest for the first stage of CBD development. Docherty also secured over 15 million dollars from the Federal Government and the University of Adelaide in building the Stretton Centre. This centre provides job training and research and development in new and emerging industries. The centre also comprises a community space.

In April 2013 Docherty launched the new Playford 2043 Vision. This is a community vision that has a focus on jobs, lifestyle, business and educational outcomes for the community.

Docherty chaired the Wakefield Group for two years from February 2011 until February 2013, representing the seven local government councils which were then located in the Federal Division of Wakefield. This group lobbies the State and Federal government on issues within its boundaries.

He has overseen the creation of the Playford Sports Hub in Elizabeth. The first stage of the masterplan concept has been approved by council for community consultation. The first stage of land has been purchased ready for the Aquadome car park expansion.

Docherty was re-elected unopposed for another four years as mayor in September 2014. In 2018, he was re-elected as mayor from a field of four candidates.

== Awards and honours ==
In 2001 Docherty was awarded a Centenary Medal for service to the community through St John, Playford Youth Council and the SA Youth Parliament. In 2010 he was awarded the Service Medal of the Order of St John, for 12 years service to St John Ambulance. In 2013 Docherty became a Member of the Order of St John. These Awards form parts of the Australian Honours System.

Centenary Medal	(2001)	Service Medal of the Order of St John	2010	Member of Order of St John	2013

The John Legoe Awards for outstanding service to Local Government were introduced in 2007 by the SA Local Government Association. Deputy Mayor Docherty was the inaugural winner of the John Legoe Encouragement Award for excellent effort during his time as a Councillor and Deputy Mayor.

At the start of the 2011 SANFL Season, Docherty was named the Number 1 ticket holder for the Central District Football Club.

Since 2012 Docherty has served on the board of Netball South Australia.

On 16 April 2013 the Sunday Mail included Docherty in its 2013 list of South Australian Rising Stars, acknowledging his contribution as Mayor of Playford, and his aspiring political career.
