= Meagan Spencer =

Australian politician

Meagan Spencer MP

Member of the South Australian House of Assembly for Torrens
- Incumbent
- Assumed office 21 March 2026
- Preceded by: Dana Wortley

Personal details
- Party: Labor
- Children: 3
- Education: University of Adelaide; University of South Australia
- Profession: Policy advisor

Meagan Ruth Spencer is an Australian Labor politician who has served as the member for Torrens in the South Australian House of Assembly since the 2026 South Australian state election.

Prior to her election to the Parliament of South Australia, Spencer worked in advisory roles across government for over 16 years, including as office manager to Labor Senator for South Australia Don Farrell and chief of staff to state government minister Clare Scriven.

Spencer is married and has three children.

South Australian House of Assembly
Preceded by Dana Wortley	Member for Torrens; 2026–present	Incumbent
