= Richard Harvey (politician) =

Australian politician

Dr Richard Harvey

Member of the South Australian House of Assembly for Newland
- In office 17 March 2018 – 19 March 2022
- Preceded by: Tom Kenyon
- Succeeded by: Olivia Savvas

Personal details
- Born: 18 April 1985 (age 41)
- Party: Liberal Party of Australia
- Children: 3

Richard Manuel Harvey (born 18 April 1985) is an Australian politician. He was a Liberal member of the South Australian House of Assembly from the 2018 state election until 2022, representing Newland.

Prior to entering Parliament, Harvey worked as a medical research scientist at the University of Adelaide, researching the bacterial pathogen Streptococcus pneumoniae.

== Background and early career ==
Harvey was raised in Lewiston and attended St Brigid's Catholic School and Xavier College in Gawler. Harvey is of Portuguese heritage, with his maternal family emigrating to Australia in 1966 from Curaçao. Harvey's father, Rob, was an aircraft technician in the Royal Australian Air Force. He is the eldest child of three.

Harvey attended the University of Adelaide, obtaining a Bachelor of Science (Biomedical Science), a Bachelor of Science (Honours) and a PhD in Microbiology. He has also been an Australian rules football umpire in the SANFL and a piano teacher.

As a postdoctoral research fellow, Harvey worked to find new ways to treat and prevent disease caused by the bacterial pathogen Streptococcus pneumoniae, which is the world's leading cause of pneumonia, bacteraemia, meningitis and otitis media. He has published several times, including in Proceedings of the National Academy of Sciences of the United States of America, Scientific Reports, mBio and Infection and Immunity.

== Politics ==
Harvey joined the Liberal Party of Australia in June 2011, and volunteered for several campaigns and party activities.

Harvey was pre-selected as the Liberal candidate for the electoral district of Newland for the 2018 South Australian state election in April 2017.

At the 2018 state election, Harvey campaigned with a strong focus on Modbury Hospital, ultimately defeating Labor MP Tom Kenyon, who had served as the Member for Newland since 2006. Harvey holds the electorate of Newland on approximately 0.1 percent margin, after the 2020 electoral redistribution.

Upon his election, Harvey was appointed Deputy Government Whip in the South Australian House of Assembly.

South Australian House of Assembly
Preceded by Tom Kenyon	Member for Newland; 2018–2022	Succeeded by Olivia Savvas
