= Gordon Davidson (politician) =

Australian politician

Gordon Davidson CBE
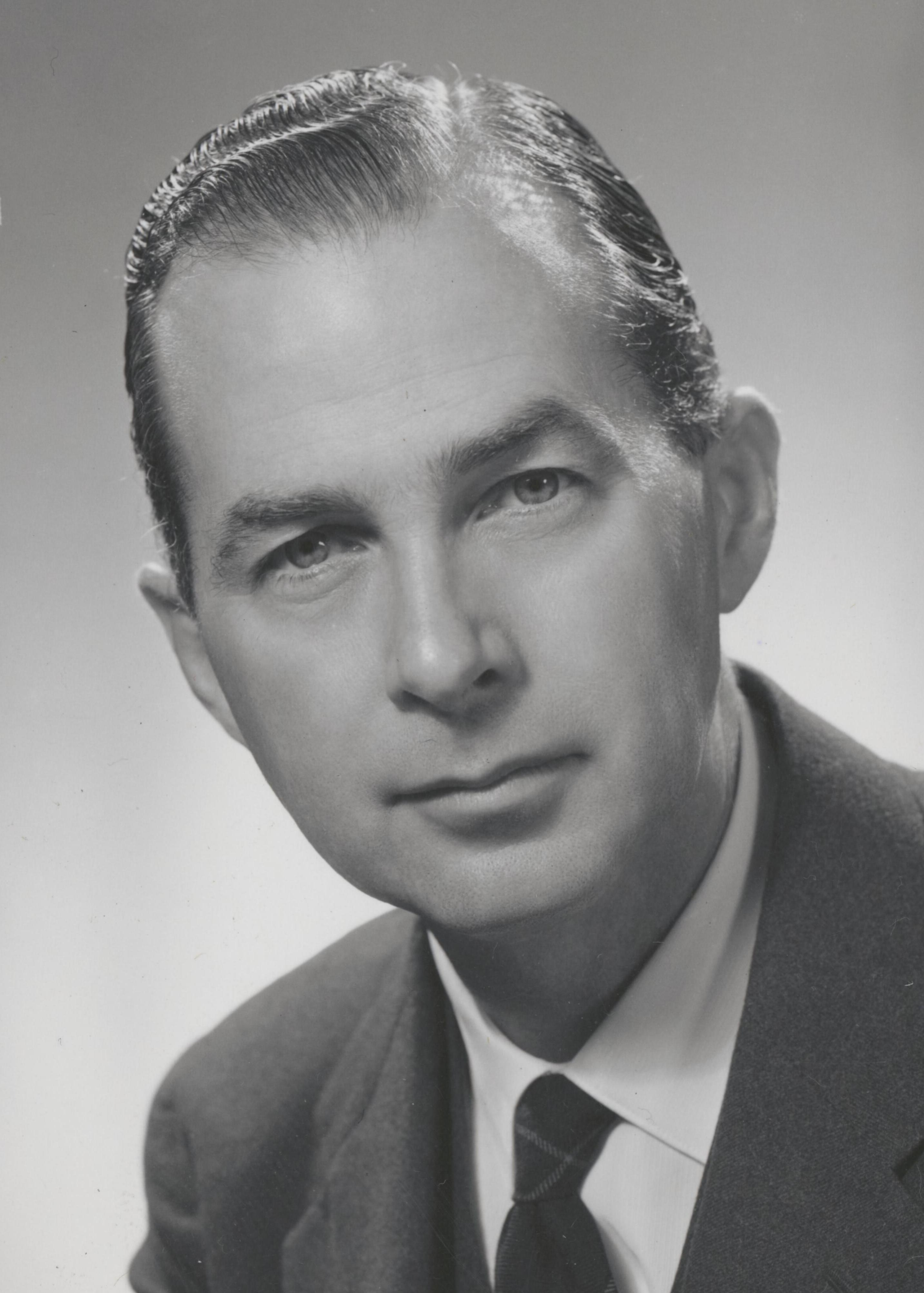

Senator for South Australia
- In office 1 July 1965 – 30 June 1981
- In office 8 February 1962 – 30 June 1962
- Preceded by: Nancy Buttfield
- In office 28 September 1961 – 8 December 1961
- Preceded by: Rex Pearson
- Succeeded by: Nancy Buttfield

Personal details
- Born: Gordon Sinclair Davidson; 17 January 1915 Adelaide
- Died: 25 November 2002 (aged 87)
- Party: Liberal
- Spouse: Patricia

Gordon Sinclair Davidson CBE (17 January 1915 – 25 November 2002) was an Australian politician. He was a member of the Liberal Party and served as a Senator for South Australia. He was twice appointed to casual vacancies (1961 and 1962) and later won election in his own right, serving 16 years (1965–1981). He was a grazier and church administrator before entering politics.

== Early life ==
Davidson's family were farmers at Angas Plains in the Strathalbyn area of South Australia. He was educated in the small Angas Plains School, then as a boarder at Scotch College in Adelaide. He worked on the family farm and was elected to the District Council of Strathalbyn, serving there from 1942 to 1950. He was also an elder and lay preacher at the Strathalbyn Presbyterian Church and joined the Liberal and Country League around 1940. He was initiated into the Freemasons in March 1941.

Davidson travelled overseas to the UK, USA and Canada for almost two years from 1950. He returned in 1952 and married Patricia Emma (Pat) Newman at the Glenelg Methodist Church. They lived in Glenelg for almost 50 years. He hosted a radio program called Presbyterian Corner from 1955 to 1969.

== Senate ==
In 1961, Davidson was appointed to the Australian Senate as a Liberal Senator for South Australia, filling the casual vacancy caused by the death of Rex Pearson. He did not contest the casual vacancy in the 1961 election, and his term ended later in 1961. Senator Nancy Buttfield resigned her own seat on 8 December 1961 and won the casual vacancy previously held by Davidson, for the remainder of Pearson's term, which was due to expire in June 1965. In February 1962, he was re-appointed to the Senate to take on Buttfield's vacancy until the term expired in 1962. He was elected in his own right in 1964, and served from 1965 until his retirement on 30 June 1981.

In the Senate, Davidson had an interest in water management and served on several committees and delegations in this area, including chair of the Senate Select Committee on Water Pollution. He also served as chairman of the Education, Science and the Arts Committee and examined the need for a multicultural and multilingual broadcasting service.

Davidson served as president of the South Australian Royal Flying Doctor Service from 1965 to 1967.

== Later life ==
Davidson was appointed a Commander of the Order of the British Empire (CBE) in January 1981 for service to the Parliament.
