= Clem Ridley =

Australian politician

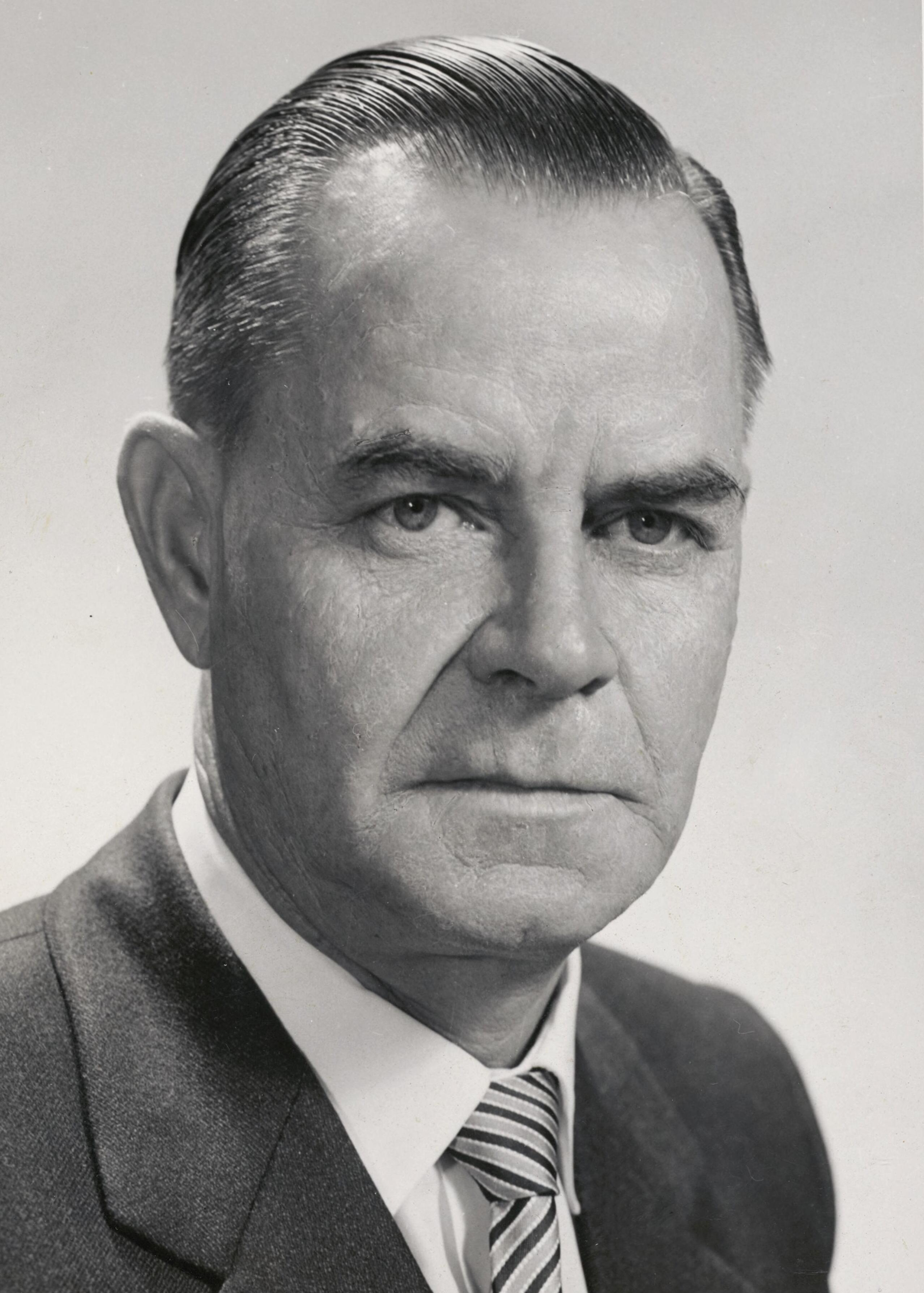
- Ridley in 1959

Senator for South Australia
- In office 1 July 1959 – 30 June 1971

Personal details
- Born: Frank Clement Rhys Williams; 13 March 1909 Kalgoorlie, Western Australia
- Died: 19 May 1988 (aged 79) Adelaide, South Australia
- Party: Labor
- Spouse: Myrtle Jury

Clement Frank Ridley (13 March 1909 – 19 May 1988) was an Australian politician. He was born to Evan Williams and Beatrice Ridley in Kalgoorlie, Western Australia. He was educated at various state schools before becoming a toolmaker in the car industry. He was Secretary of the Vehicle Builders' Union and President of the United Trades and Labour Council of South Australia. From 1957 to 1958 he was President of the South Australian Labor Party. In 1958, he was elected to the Australian Senate as a Labor Senator for South Australia. He held the seat until his retirement in 1971.

Ridley died in Adelaide on 19 May 1988, aged 79.
