= Di Gayler =

Australian politician

Dianne Louise Gayler (born 9 June 1948) is a former Australian politician who represented the South Australian House of Assembly seat of Newland for the Labor Party from 1985 to 1989.

South Australian House of Assembly
Preceded by John Klunder	Member for Newland; 1985–1989	Succeeded by Dorothy Kotz
