= Brian Billard =

Australian scientist

Brian Billard was an Australian scientist who represented the South Australian House of Assembly electoral district of Newland for the Liberal Party from 1979 to 1982. Whilst a Member of Parliament he was a member of the Parliamentary Committee on Land Settlement.

Prior to his retirement in the early 2000s, Billard headed the Military Computing Systems branch at Defence Science and Technology Organisation's Salisbury site (now named Edinburgh), with a focus on "trusted systems". In 1997 he was appointed an adjunct professor at the University of Queensland.

On retirement, Billard and his wife Liz worked on an education project in China.

South Australian House of Assembly
Preceded by John Klunder	Member for Newland; 1979–1982	Succeeded by John Klunder
