= Olivia Savvas =

Australian politician

Olivia Savvas MP
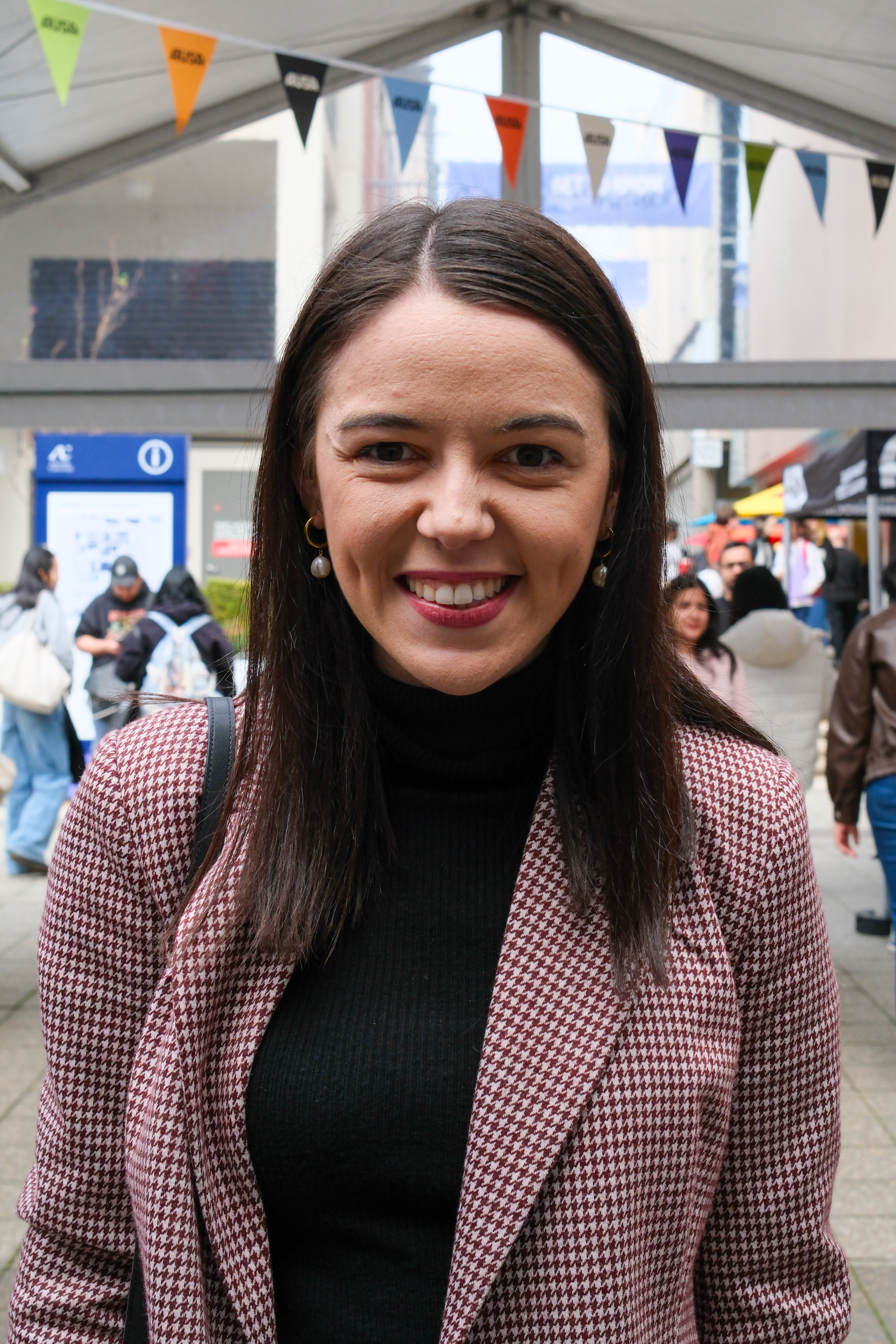
- Savvas in 2026

Member of the South Australian House of Assembly for Newland
- Incumbent
- Assumed office 19 March 2022
- Preceded by: Richard Harvey

Personal details
- Born: 22 May 1996 (age 30) North Adelaide, South Australia
- Party: Labor
- Education: Bachelor of Laws; Bachelor of International Studies; Diploma of Languages (French)
- Alma mater: University of Adelaide
- Committees: Occupational Safety, Rehabilitation and Compensation
- Website: ALP website

Olivia Madison Savvas (born 22 May 1996) is an Australian politician. She has been a Labor member of the South Australian House of Assembly since the 2022 state election, representing Newland. With a swing of 5.4 per cent, she defeated the incumbent Liberal Party member, Richard Harvey, who had held the seat since 2018. Prior to the election, the ABC election analyst Antony Green stated that since its establishment in 1976, Newland has had a history of following the state electoral trend, and was previously held by Labor between 2006 and 2018.

Savvas grew up in the northeastern suburbs of Adelaide and has a Bachelor of Laws, Bachelor of International Studies and a Diploma of Languages in French. Prior to her election to Parliament she was a councillor on the City of Tea Tree Gully Council and was employed as an analyst by a major bank.

== Personal life and career ==
Olivia Madison Savvas grew up and went to school in the northeastern suburbs of Adelaide, attending high school at Kildare College and Saint Ignatius' College. She studied law, international studies and French at the University of Adelaide, and when she was elected to Parliament she was working as an analyst in a major bank focusing on counter-terrorism finance. She had also been a union official. Her family originates from the Greek island of Samos. She has publicly stated she is of Greek, Austrian, and Serbian heritage.

== Political career ==
Savvas was involved with the Labor Party before she served three years as a councillor representing the Balmoral Ward on the City of Tea Tree Gully Council, taking leave of absence to campaign for Newland in the 2022 state election. The Balmoral Ward includes parts of Newland. At the time of the 2022 election, Newland was held by Richard Harvey for the Liberal Party on a margin of just 0.1 per cent. Prior to the election, ABC election analyst Antony Green stated that since its establishment in 1976, Newland has a history of following the state electoral trend, and was previously held by Labor between 2006 and 2018. At the election, Savvas received 55.4 per cent of the two-party-preferred vote from 36.8 per cent of the first-preference votes, achieving a 5.4 per cent swing to the Labor Party. Elected at age 25, she is the youngest member of the South Australian Parliament and is the youngest woman ever elected to the House of Assembly. From 3 May 2022 until 30 June 2023 she was a member of the Aboriginal Lands Parliamentary Standing Committee, a member of the Joint Committee on the Mental Health and Wellbeing of Veterinarians from 14 Nov 2024 to 28 Nov 2024, and was chair of the Stillbirth in South Australia Committee from 31 Oct 2024 to 11 Nov 2025. She has been a member of the Parliamentary Committee on Occupational Safety, Rehabilitation and Compensation since 3 May 2022, a member of the Joint Committee on Harmful Algal Blooms in South Australia since 4 September 2025, and the presiding member of the Public Works Committee since 14 October 2025.

== Footnotes ==
South Australian House of Assembly
Preceded by Richard Harvey	Member for Newland; 2022–present	Incumbent
