= Dana Wortley =

Australian politician

Member of the South Australian House of Assembly for Torrens
- In office 15 March 2014 – 20 March 2026
- Preceded by: Robyn Geraghty
- Succeeded by: Meagan Spencer

Senator for South Australia
- In office 1 July 2005 – 30 June 2011
- Preceded by: Nick Bolkus
- Succeeded by: Penny Wright

Personal details
- Born: Dana Johanna Wortley; 1959 (age 66–67)
- Party: Labor
- Spouse: Russell Wortley
- Children: 1
- Education: University of South Australia

Dana Johanna Wortley (born 1959) is a former Australian politician who represented South Australia as a Labor Senator in the Federal Parliament from 2005 to 2011, and then sat in the South Australian House of Assembly as the Labor member for Torrens from 2014 until her retirement in 2026.

== Early life and education ==
Wortley was born in 1959. She has a Bachelor of Education (Communication Studies) from the University of South Australia and a Diploma of Teaching from the Salisbury College of Advanced Education.

== Career ==
=== Early career ===
Wortley was employed as a primary school teacher, a journalist, and state secretary for the Media, Entertainment and Arts Alliance before entering politics.

=== Politics ===
Wortley was placed third on South Australian Labor's Senate ticket at the 2004 federal election and was elected, commencing her six-year term on 1 July 2005. She was again placed third on the ticket at the 2010 federal election but her re-election attempt was unsuccessful with only the first two candidates elected. Her term ended on 30 June 2011.

Wortley won the South Australian House of Assembly seat of Torrens at the 2014 state election. She is a member of the Public Works and Social Development committees.

Wortley announced on 8 October 2025 that she would not be recontesting her seat at the 2026 election.

== Personal life ==
Wortley married fellow state Labor politician Russell Wortley. They have one son.

Parliament of Australia
Preceded by Nick Bolkus	Senator for South Australia; 2005–2011	Succeeded by Penny Wright
South Australian House of Assembly
Preceded by Robyn Geraghty	Member for Torrens; 2014–2026	Succeeded by Meagan Spencer
