= Joe Tiernan =

Australian politician

Patrick Joseph Tiernan (8 March 1942 – 31 March 1994) was an Australian politician who represented the South Australian House of Assembly seat of Torrens from 1993 to 1994 for the Liberal Party.

South Australian House of Assembly
New seat	Member for Torrens; 1993–1994	Succeeded by Robyn Geraghty
