= Robyn Geraghty =

Australian politician

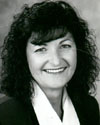

Member of the South Australian Parliament for Torrens
- In office 7 May 1994 – 15 March 2014

Personal details
- Born: 8 August 1959 (age 67)
- Party: Australian Labor Party (SA)

Robyn Kathryn Geraghty (born 8 August 1949) was the Labor member for the electoral district of Torrens in South Australia from 1994 to 2014. She was elected at a by-election held in 1994 to replace Joe Tiernan who had died in office.

Geraghty has been heavily involved in community issues, as well as introducing various acts into parliament. She was also her party's parliamentary whip.

The 2006 election saw Geraghty increase her margin to 19.1%.

Geraghty did not re-contest her seat at the 2014 election.

South Australian House of Assembly
Preceded by Joe Tiernan	Member for Torrens; 1994–2014	Succeeded by Dana Wortley
