= Rex Pearson =

Australian politician

Senator for South Australia
- In office 28 April 1951 – 11 September 1961
- Succeeded by: Gordon Davidson

Member for Flinders
- In office 1941–1951
- Preceded by: Edward Craigie
- Succeeded by: Glen Pearson

Personal details
- Born: 13 January 1905 Kadina, South Australia
- Died: 11 September 1961 (aged 56) Woodville, South Australia
- Party: Liberal and Country League and Liberal
- Spouse: Laurel Hooper (married 1929)
- Relations: Brother Glen Pearson; Cousin Colin Rowe
- Children: one
- Parent(s): Thomas William Pearson and his wife Julia Adams, née Rowe
- Occupation: Farmer and grazier

Rex Whiting Pearson (13 January 1905 – 11 September 1961) was an Australian politician. Born in Kadina, South Australia, he was educated in Adelaide at Prince Alfred College before becoming a farmer and grazier, initially at Sandilands on the Yorke Peninsula in South Australia.

In 1927, Pearson moved with his widowed mother to Jamestown. In 1935, he moved with his family, and that of his brother Glen, to Cockaleechie. In the following year, he moved 20 km north to Yeelanna. He first contested the South Australian House of Assembly electorate of Flinders for the Liberal and Country League at the state election in 1938, but lost to Edward Craigie, the candidate for the Single Tax League, after the distribution of preferences.

In 1941, Pearson was elected for Flinders, defeating Craigie on preferences from the Labor candidate. Even though he moved to Belair, and later Lower Mitcham near Adelaide and his mother's home, he won the 1947 and 1950 elections for Flinders, and retained his interest and support for farming and rural interests in his electorate on the Eyre Peninsula.

In 1951, Pearson transferred to federal politics, winning a seat in the Australian Senate as a Liberal at that year's double dissolution federal election. His brother Glen won the by-election for the consequential vacancy in the seat of Flinders. Pearson held his Senate seat by winning elections in 1953 and 1958, until his death in 1961, after which the South Australian parliament appointed Gordon Davidson to replace him.

Pearson was a Methodist lay preacher on the Eyre Peninsula.

South Australian House of Assembly
Preceded by Edward Craigie	Member for Flinders; 1941–1951	Succeeded by Glen Pearson
