= Electoral district of Torrens =

South Australian state electoral district

Torrens South Australia—House of Assembly
- Interactive map of electoral district boundaries from the 2022 state election (Note: The electorate will have no change in boundaries at the 2026 state election.)
- State: South Australia
- Dates current: 1902–1915, 1938–1985, 1993–present
- MP: Meagan Spencer
- Party: Labor
- Namesake: Robert Torrens
- Electors: 28,133 (2026)
- Area: 17.9 km^{2} (6.9 sq mi)
- Demographic: Metropolitan
- Coordinates: 34°51′50″S 138°39′35″E
Electorates around Torrens:
| Florey | Florey | Newland |
| Enfield | Torrens | Hartley |
| Adelaide | Dunstan | Hartley |

Torrens is a single-member electoral district for the South Australian House of Assembly. Located along the River Torrens, it is named after Sir Robert Richard Torrens, a 19th-century Premier of South Australia noted for being the founder of the "Torrens title" land registration system. Torrens is an 17.9 km^{2} (6.9 sq mi) suburban electorate in Adelaide's inner north-east. It includes the suburbs of Gilles Plains, Greenacres, Hampstead Gardens, Hillcrest, Holden Hill, Klemzig, Manningham, Oakden, Vale Park, Valley View and Windsor Gardens.

== History ==
Torrens has had three incarnations as a South Australian House of Assembly electoral district. It first existed from 1902 until 1915 as a large multi-member district covering most of the southern and eastern suburbs of Adelaide. In its next two incarnations as a single-member electorate, from 1938 until 1985 and from 1993 until present, Torrens has been a much smaller metropolitan seat in Adelaide's inner north-eastern suburbs, located around or adjacent to the Torrens River.

It was first created for the 1902 election as a five-seat multi-member district stretching from the north-eastern suburbs through the eastern and southern suburbs to the south-western suburbs; polling places were Unley Town Hall, Norwood Town Hall, Glen Osmond, Magill, Kent Town, Eastwood, Burnside, Rose Park, Marryatville State school. Goodwood, South-road, Hyde Park, Sturt, St Peters, Payneham, Campbelltown, Parkside, Glenelg, Brighton, Mitcham, Belair and Upper Sturt. Together with the three-member Port Adelaide (covering the north-western and western suburbs) and the four-member Adelaide (covering central Adelaide and the inner-northern suburbs), the three districts with a total of 12-members covered the whole of the metropolitan area in the 42 member house. Torrens was abolished and absorbed into the new seats of East Torrens and Sturt at the 1915 election.

Torrens existed as a marginal to fairly safe Liberal and Country League/Liberal single-member seat under the Playmander system from the 1938 election, lasting until the 1985 election, though it was won once by Labor at the 1944 election. Torrens was one of just three metropolitan seats (with Burnside and Mitcham) won by the Liberal and Country League in 1965 and 1968.

Torrens was recreated in its current state for the 1993 election, based on much of the abolished seats of Gilles and Todd, as a nominally marginal Labor seat, but was won for the Liberal Joe Tiernan. Tiernan died while in office in 1994, and Robyn Geraghty reclaimed the seat for Labor at the Torrens by-election with an 8.6 percent swing. Former Senator Dana Wortley won the seat for Labor at the 2014 election and has retained it through the 2018 election and subsequent 2022 election.

== Members for Torrens ==
First incarnation (1902–1915, 5 members)
| Term | Member | Party | Member | Party | Member | Party | Member | Party | Member | Party | Term |
|---|---|---|---|---|---|---|---|---|---|---|---|
| 1902–1905 | John Darling Jr. | National League | John Jenkins | | George Soward | National League | Thomas Price | Labor | Frederick Coneybeer | Labor | 1902–1905 |
| 1905–1910 | Crawford Vaughan | Labor | George Dankel | Labor | Thomas Smeaton | Labor | Thomas Price | Labor | Frederick Coneybeer | Labor | 1905–1910 |
| 1910–1912 | Crawford Vaughan | Labor | George Dankel | Labor | Thomas Smeaton | Labor | Thomas Ryan | United Labor | Frederick Coneybeer | Labor | 1910–1912 |
| 1912–1915 | Crawford Vaughan | Labor | Herbert Hudd | Liberal Union | Thomas Smeaton | Labor | Angas Parsons | Liberal Union | Frederick Coneybeer | Labor | 1912–1915 |

Second incarnation (1938–1985, single-member)
| Member | Party | Term |
|---|---|---|
| Shirley Jeffries | Liberal and Country | 1938–1944 |
| Herbert Baldock | Labor | 1944–1947 |
| Shirley Jeffries | Liberal and Country | 1947–1953 |
| Leo Travers | Liberal and Country | 1953–1956 |
| John Coumbe | Liberal and Country | 1956–1974 |
| John Coumbe | Liberal | 1974–1977 |
| Michael Wilson | Liberal | 1977–1985 |

Third incarnation (1993–present, single-member)
| Member | Party | Term |
|---|---|---|
| Joe Tiernan | Liberal | 1993–1994 |
| Robyn Geraghty | Labor | 1994–2014 |
| Dana Wortley | Labor | 2014–2026 |
| Meagan Spencer | Labor | 2026–present |

== Election results ==
2026 South Australian state election: Torrens
| Party | Candidate | Votes | % | ±% |
|---|---|---|---|---|
| Labor | Meagan Spencer | 10,294 | 43.4 | −5.2 |
| One Nation | David Medlock | 4,920 | 20.7 | +20.7 |
| Liberal | Haritha Yara | 3,781 | 15.9 | −17.7 |
| Greens | Stella Salvemini | 3,430 | 14.5 | +3.9 |
| Family First | Mervin Joshua | 786 | 3.3 | −3.9 |
| United Voice | Bradley Warren | 292 | 1.2 | +1.2 |
| Australian Family | Malcolm Reynolds | 236 | 1.0 | +1.0 |
| Total formal votes | | 23,739 | 96.2 | −0.7 |
| Informal votes | | 925 | 3.8 | +0.7 |
| Turnout | | 24,664 | 87.7 | −0.7 |
Two-party-preferred result
| Labor | Meagan Spencer | 15,582 | 65.6 | +5.6 |
| One Nation | David Medlock | 8,157 | 34.4 | +34.4 |
| Labor hold | | Swing | +5.6 | |
