= Molly Byrne =

Australian politician

Molly Veronica Byrne OAM (born 30 November 1928) is a former Australian politician who represented the South Australian House of Assembly seats of Barossa from 1965 to 1970, Tea Tree Gully from 1970 to 1977, and Todd from 1977 to 1979 for the Labor Party.

At the 1965 election Byrne was Labor's first woman elected to the Parliament of South Australia, the second woman elected to the House of Assembly, and the third woman elected to the Parliament of South Australia after the Liberal and Country League's Jessie Cooper and Joyce Steele both elected at the 1959 election.

In 1985 Byrne was awarded the Medal of the Order of Australia for "service to the community and parliamentary service".

== See also ==
- Women and government in Australia
- Women in the South Australian House of Assembly

Parliament of South Australia
Preceded by Condor Laucke	Member for Barossa; 1965–1970	Seat abolished
New seat	Member for Tea Tree Gully; 1970–1977	Seat abolished
New seat	Member for Todd; 1977–1979	Succeeded by Scott Ashenden
