= Electoral district of Todd =

Former South Australian electoral district

Coordinates: 34°51′50″S 138°39′35″E

Todd South Australia—House of Assembly
- State: South Australia
- Created: 1977
- Abolished: 1993
- Namesake: Charles Todd
- Demographic: Metropolitan

Todd was an electoral district of the House of Assembly in the Australian state of South Australia from 1977 to 1993. The new seat of Torrens absorbed much of the abolished seat of Todd at the 1991 redistribution.

== Members ==
Member	Party	Term
Molly Byrne	Labor	1977–1979
Scott Ashenden	Liberal	1979–1985
John Klunder	Labor	1985–1993
