= Scott Ashenden =

Australian politician

Edward Scott Ashenden (born 5 October 1939) was an Australian politician who represented the South Australian House of Assembly seats of Todd from 1979 to 1985 and Wright from 1993 to 1997 for the Liberal Party.

Political offices
Preceded by John Oswald	Minister for Housing, Urban Development and Local Government Relations; 1995–1996	Succeeded by Stephen Baker (Housing and Urban Development); Himself (Local Government)
Preceded by Graham Ingerson	Minister for Tourism; 1996–1997	Succeeded by Joan Hall
Preceded by Himself as Minister for Housing, Urban Development; Local Government Relations	Minister for Local Government; 1996–1997	Succeeded by Mark Brindal
Preceded by Graham Ingerson as Minister for Recreation, Sport and Racing	Minister for Recreation and Sport; 1996–1997	Succeeded by Iain Evans
South Australian House of Assembly
Preceded by Molly Byrne	Member for Todd; 1979–1985	Succeeded by John Klunder
New seat	Member for Wright; 1993–1997	Succeeded by Jennifer Rankine
