= Electoral district of Newland =

South Australian state electoral district

Newland South Australia—House of Assembly
- Interactive map of electoral district boundaries from the 2022 state election (Note: The electorate will have no change in boundaries at the 2026 state election.)
- State: South Australia
- Created: 1977
- MP: Olivia Savvas
- Party: Labor
- Namesake: Simpson Newland
- Electors: 27,020 (2026)
- Area: 26.1 km^{2} (10.1 sq mi)
- Demographic: Metropolitan
- Coordinates: 34°47′31″S 138°45′21″E
Electorates around Newland:
King	King	Schubert
Wright; Florey	Newland	Schubert; Morialta
Torrens	Morialta	Morialta

Newland is a single-member electoral district for the South Australian House of Assembly. It is named after pioneer Simpson Newland, a prominent figure in nineteenth-century South Australia. It is a suburban electorate in north-eastern Adelaide, taking in the suburbs of Banksia Park, Fairview Park, Yatala Vale, Hope Valley, Ridgehaven, St Agnes, Tea Tree Gully, and Modbury, as well as part of Modbury North.

== History ==
Replacing the abolished electoral district of Tea Tree Gully, Newland was created at the 1976 redistribution, taking effect at the 1977 election. It followed a bellwether pattern until the 1989 election, where it was won by Liberal candidate Dorothy Kotz. Kotz developed a strong personal following and had little difficulty being re-elected until her retirement at the 2006 election. Her retirement and the landslide Labor victory across the state led to Labor candidate Tom Kenyon winning the electorate. It became the Labor government's most marginal electorate at the 2014 election.

The 2016 redistribution ahead of the 2018 election changed Newland from a 1.4 percent Labor electorate to a notional 0.1 percent Liberal electorate.

== Members for Newland ==
Member	Party	Term
John Klunder	Labor	1977–1979
Brian Billard	Liberal	1979–1982
John Klunder	Labor	1982–1985
Di Gayler	Labor	1985–1989
Dorothy Kotz	Liberal	1989–2006
Tom Kenyon	Labor	2006–2018
Richard Harvey	Liberal	2018–2022
Olivia Savvas	Labor	2022–present

== Election results ==
2026 South Australian state election: Newland
Party	Candidate	Votes	%	±%
Labor	Olivia Savvas	11,348	46.2	+9.3
One Nation	Alison Dew-Fennell	6,088	24.8	+21.0
Liberal	Sarai Birch	3,789	15.4	−19.2
Greens	Helen Wright	2,118	8.6	+2.8
Family First	Rachel Mathew	658	2.7	−0.9
Australian Family	Colin Stanford	211	0.9	−0.1
United Voice	Abe Lazootin	206	0.8	+0.8
Fair Go	Hayley Marley-Duncan	136	0.6	+0.6
Total formal votes		24,554	96.9	+1.3
Informal votes		785	3.1	−1.3
Turnout		25,339	93.8	+2.9
Two-candidate-preferred result
Labor	Olivia Savvas	14,221	60.3	+4.9
One Nation	Alison Dew-Fennell	9,382	39.7	+39.7
Labor hold				
