= John Klunder =

Australian politician

John Heinz Cornelis Klunder (born 22 November 1940) was an Australian politician who represented the South Australian House of Assembly seats of Newland from 1977 to 1979 and 1982 to 1985 and Todd from 1985 to 1993 for the Labor Party.

Todd was abolished before the 1993 election and Klunder contested the new seat of Torrens but was defeated by Liberal candidate Joe Tiernan.

Klunder then retired from politics and did not contest the Torrens by-election when Tiernan died months later.

The by-election was won by ALP candidate Robyn Geraghty.

Political offices
Preceded by Ron Payne	Minister of Mines and Energy; 1988–1992	Succeeded by Frank Blevins as Minister for Mineral Resources
Preceded by Roy Abbott	Minister of Forests; 1988–1992	Ministry abolished
Preceded by Don Hopgood	Minister of Emergency Services; 1989–1992	Succeeded by Kym Mayes
New title	Minister of Public Infrastructure; 1992–1993	Succeeded by John Olsen as Minister for Infrastructure
South Australian House of Assembly
New seat	Member for Newland; 1977–1979	Succeeded by Brian Billard
Preceded by Brian Billard	Member for Newland; 1982–1985	Succeeded by Di Gayler
Preceded by Scott Ashenden	Member for Todd; 1985–1993	Abolished
