= Dorothy Kotz =

Australian politician

Dorothy Christine Kotz (born 3 January 1944) is an Australian former politician who was the sitting Liberal Party member for the electoral district of Newland of the South Australian House of Assembly from 1989 until her retirement in 2006.

== Career ==
Kotz held many portfolios during her political career, including Minister for Employment, Training and Further Education, Minister for Youth Affairs, Minister for Correctional Services, Minister for Environment and Heritage, Minister for Aboriginal Affairs, Minister for Local Government, Minister for Recreation, Sport and Racing, Minister for Administrative and Information Services, and has also been a Member of the Executive Council.

In 1993, Kotz expressed interest in presenting a private members bill intended to reinstate capital punishment. Capital punishment had been abolished in South Australia in 1976.

In 1999, acting as Environment Minister, Kotz authorised orchard and vineyard owners to shoot common native bird species, including rainbow lorikeets, musk lorikeets and Adelaide rosellas. She was also responsible for the management of water inflows into the Coorong, and the maintenance of the mouth of the Murray River.

The 2006 election saw her personal vote evaporate, and with the statewide Labor Party (ALP) swing, saw her successor Liberal Party candidate Mark Osterstock suffer a swing of 12.5 per cent, giving the seat to the ALP on a margin of 6.8 per cent.

== See also ==
- Politics of Australia
- Government of Australia
