= Results of the 1977 South Australian state election (House of Assembly) =

South Australian state election, 17 September 1977 House of Assembly << 1975–1979 >>
Enrolled voters	818,341				
Votes cast	764,077		Turnout	93.37	-0.19
Informal votes	20,743		Informal	2.71	-1.14
Summary of votes by party
Party	Primary votes	%	Swing	Seats	Change
Labor	383,831	51.64	+5.31	27	+ 4
Liberal	306,356	41.21	+9.68	17	– 3
Democrats	25,855	3.48	*	1	– 1
National Country	11,855	1.59	-1.18	1	± 0
Independent Liberal	10,793	1.45	*	1	+ 1
Independent	2,914	0.39	-0.51	0	– 1
Other	1,730	0.23	*	0	± 0
Total	743,334			47	
Two-party-preferred
Labor	396,957	53.40	+4.20		
Liberal	346,372	46.60	–4.20		

This is a list of House of Assembly results for the 1977 South Australian state election.

== Results by electoral district ==
=== Adelaide ===
1977 South Australian state election: Adelaide
Party	Candidate	Votes	%	±%
Labor	Jack Wright	9,996	66.2	+5.9
Liberal	Terry McClean	5,102	33.8	+12.8
Total formal votes		15,098	96.1	
Informal votes		605	3.9	
Turnout		15,703	90.1	
Labor hold		Swing	+4.0	

=== Albert Park ===
1977 South Australian state election: Albert Park
Party	Candidate	Votes	%	±%
Labor	Charles Harrison	10,188	64.1	+2.1
Liberal	Glendon Stotter	5,701	35.9	+13.5
Total formal votes		15,889	96.2	
Informal votes		621	3.8	
Turnout		16,510	94.6	
Labor hold		Swing	0.0	

=== Alexandra ===
1977 South Australian state election: Alexandra
Party	Candidate	Votes	%	±%
Liberal	Ted Chapman	9,822	61.5	+8.6
Labor	Kenneth Jared	4,159	26.1	+6.7
Democrats	Kaye Gibbs	1,976	12.4	+12.4
Total formal votes		15,957	98.2	
Informal votes		298	1.8	
Turnout		16,255	93.8	
Two-party-preferred result
Liberal	Ted Chapman	11,134	69.8	−6.6
Labor	Kenneth Jared	4,823	30.2	+6.6
Liberal hold		Swing	−6.6	

=== Ascot Park ===
1977 South Australian state election: Ascot Park
Party	Candidate	Votes	%	±%
Labor	Geoff Virgo	9,331	59.2	+1.1
Liberal	Dean Le Poidevin	4,594	29.1	+5.3
Democrats	Kenneth Johnson	1,845	11.7	+11.7
Total formal votes		15,770	98.1	
Informal votes		299	1.9	
Turnout		16,069	94.3	
Two-party-preferred result
Labor	Geoff Virgo	9,856	62.5	+1.7
Liberal	Dean Le Poidevin	5,914	37.5	−1.7
Labor hold		Swing	+1.7	

=== Baudin ===
1977 South Australian state election: Baudin
Party	Candidate	Votes	%	±%
Labor	Don Hopgood	11,463	66.7	+9.6
Liberal	Mervyn Sawade	5,722	33.3	+11.9
Total formal votes		17,185	96.0	
Informal votes		713	4.0	
Turnout		17,898	93.7	
Labor hold		Swing	+6.4	

=== Bragg ===
1977 South Australian state election: Bragg
Party	Candidate	Votes	%	±%
Liberal	David Tonkin	10,134	65.3	+12.8
Labor	Kevin Winn	5,390	34.7	+7.3
Total formal votes		15,524	97.6	
Informal votes		380	2.4	
Turnout		15,904	91.6	
Liberal hold		Swing	−4.2	

=== Brighton ===
1977 South Australian state election: Brighton
Party	Candidate	Votes	%	±%
Labor	Hugh Hudson	8,911	52.6	−0.6
Liberal	Natalie Richardson	5,822	34.3	+13.1
Democrats	Ronald Moulds	2,224	13.1	+13.1
Total formal votes		16,957	98.5	
Informal votes		256	1.5	
Turnout		17,213	94.7	
Two-party-preferred result
Labor	Hugh Hudson	9,848	58.1	+1.3
Liberal	Natalie Richardson	7,109	41.9	−1.3
Labor hold		Swing	+1.3	

=== Chaffey ===
1977 South Australian state election: Chaffey
Party	Candidate	Votes	%	±%
Liberal	Peter Arnold	9,522	59.6	+7.5
Labor	John Howe	6,445	40.4	+11.0
Total formal votes		15,967	97.5	
Informal votes		401	2.5	
Turnout		16,368	93.4	
Liberal hold		Swing	−8.2	

=== Coles ===
1977 South Australian state election: Coles
Party	Candidate	Votes	%	±%
Liberal	Jennifer Adamson	8,355	51.4	+12.7
Labor	Greg Crafter	7,903	48.6	+5.1
Total formal votes		16,258	97.2	
Informal votes		468	2.8	
Turnout		16,726	94.4	
Liberal hold		Swing	−2.4	

=== Davenport ===
1977 South Australian state election: Davenport
Party	Candidate	Votes	%	±%
Liberal	Dean Brown	10,311	64.5	+11.8
Labor	Terry Cameron	3,226	20.2	−2.8
Democrats	Michael Lee	2,112	13.2	+13.2
Workers	Ewan Hutchison	345	2.1	+2.1
Total formal votes		15,994	98.8	
Informal votes		200	1.2	
Turnout		16,194	92.9	
Two-party-preferred result
Liberal	Dean Brown	11,865	74.2	+0.9
Labor	Terry Cameron	4,129	25.8	−0.9
Liberal hold		Swing	+0.9	

=== Elizabeth ===
1977 South Australian state election: Elizabeth
Party	Candidate	Votes	%	±%
Labor	Peter Duncan	11,082	72.4	+8.4
Liberal	Anthony Hutton	4,235	27.6	+11.8
Total formal votes		15,317	94.7	
Informal votes		862	5.3	
Turnout		16,179	92.4	
Labor hold		Swing	+4.3	

=== Eyre ===
1977 South Australian state election: Eyre
Party	Candidate	Votes	%	±%
Liberal	Graham Gunn	7,259	53.5	−2.5
Labor	Michael Sachsse	3,179	23.4	−14.4
Labor	Barry Piltz	3,131	23.1	+23.1
Total formal votes		13,569	97.9	
Informal votes		296	2.1	
Turnout		13,865	88.8	
Two-party-preferred result
Liberal	Graham Gunn	7,589	55.9	−5.4
Labor	Michael Sachsse	5,980	44.1	+5.4
Liberal hold		Swing	−5.4	

=== Fisher ===
1977 South Australian state election: Fisher
Party	Candidate	Votes	%	±%
Liberal	Stan Evans	10,429	60.4	+17.9
Labor	Sean Dawes	6,828	39.6	+6.4
Total formal votes		17,257	97.5	
Informal votes		439	2.5	
Turnout		17,696	93.6	
Liberal hold		Swing	−2.3	

=== Flinders ===
1977 South Australian state election: Flinders
Party	Candidate	Votes	%	±%
National	Peter Blacker	7,618	51.5	+11.2
Labor	Terrence Krieg	3,700	25.0	+0.3
Liberal	Victor Gerschwitz	3,477	23.5	−8.4
Total formal votes		14,795	98.7	
Informal votes		188	1.3	
Turnout		14,983	95.2	
Two-party-preferred result
National	Peter Blacker	10,986	74.2	+2.9
Labor	Terrence Krieg	3,809	25.8	+25.8
National hold		Swing	N/A	

=== Florey ===
1977 South Australian state election: Florey
Party	Candidate	Votes	%	±%
Labor	Charles Wells	10,824	67.0	+6.1
Liberal	John Wadey	5,325	33.0	+11.7
Total formal votes		16,149	96.6	
Informal votes		573	3.4	
Turnout		16,722	93.3	
Labor hold		Swing	+3.4	

=== Gilles ===
1977 South Australian state election: Gilles
Party	Candidate	Votes	%	±%
Labor	Jack Slater	9,339	58.1	+2.7
Liberal	Lois Bell	4,905	30.5	+7.5
Democrats	Andrew Graham	1,841	11.4	+11.4
Total formal votes		16,085	97.9	
Informal votes		350	2.1	
Turnout		16,435	93.7	
Two-party-preferred result
Labor	Jack Slater	10,101	62.8	+3.7
Liberal	Lois Bell	5,984	37.2	−3.7
Labor hold		Swing	+3.7	

=== Glenelg ===
1977 South Australian state election: Glenelg
Party	Candidate	Votes	%	±%
Liberal	John Mathwin	9,421	59.5	+23.9
Labor	Barbara Wiese	6,423	40.5	−0.4
Total formal votes		15,844	97.7	
Informal votes		374	2.3	
Turnout		16,218	92.8	
Liberal hold		Swing	+4.2	

=== Goyder ===
1977 South Australian state election: Goyder
Party	Candidate	Votes	%	±%
Liberal	David Boundy	6,088	38.8	+1.3
Independent Liberal	Keith Russack	5,907	37.7	+37.7
Labor	Roger Thomas	3,690	23.5	+4.6
Total formal votes		15,685	98.6	
Informal votes		226	1.4	
Turnout		15,911	94.7	
Two-candidate-preferred result
Independent Liberal	Keith Russack	9,082	57.9	+57.9
Liberal	David Boundy	6,603	42.1	
Independent Liberal gain from Liberal Movement		Swing	N/A	

=== Hanson ===
1977 South Australian state election: Hanson
Party	Candidate	Votes	%	±%
Liberal	Heini Becker	8,885	55.4	+18.1
Labor	Reece Jennings	7,150	44.6	+2.0
Total formal votes		16,035	97.0	
Informal votes		490	3.0	
Turnout		16,525	92.9	
Liberal hold		Swing	+1.1	

=== Hartley ===
1977 South Australian state election: Hartley
Party	Candidate	Votes	%	±%
Labor	Des Corcoran	9,965	58.5	+7.2
Liberal	George Trotta	6,329	37.2	+9.1
Workers	William Forster	734	4.3	+4.3
Total formal votes		17,028	96.8	
Informal votes		556	3.2	
Turnout		17,584	94.1	
Two-party-preferred result
Labor	Des Corcoran	10,292	60.4	+5.7
Liberal	George Trotta	6,736	39.6	−5.7
Labor hold		Swing	+5.7	

=== Henley Beach ===
1977 South Australian state election: Henley Beach
Party	Candidate	Votes	%	±%
Labor	Glen Broomhill	9,780	59.3	+4.4
Liberal	Barry Lawson	6,702	40.7	+11.3
Total formal votes		16,482	96.5	
Informal votes		590	3.5	
Turnout		17,072	94.0	
Labor hold		Swing	+2.0	

=== Kavel ===
1977 South Australian state election: Kavel
Party	Candidate	Votes	%	±%
Liberal	Roger Goldsworthy	10,260	63.8	+12.6
Labor	Sydney Tilmouth	4,589	28.5	+8.1
Democrats	Reginald Goldsworthy	1,244	7.7	+7.7
Total formal votes		16,093	98.2	
Informal votes		288	1.8	
Turnout		16,381	94.4	
Two-party-preferred result
Liberal	Roger Goldsworthy	11,064	68.7	−6.3
Labor	Sydney Tilmouth	5,029	31.3	+6.3
Liberal hold		Swing	−6.3	

=== Light ===
1977 South Australian state election: Light
Party	Candidate	Votes	%	±%
Liberal	Bruce Eastick	8,968	60.7	+12.0
Labor	James Reese	5,815	39.3	+9.3
Total formal votes		14,783	97.6	
Informal votes		362	2.4	
Turnout		15,145	93.7	
Liberal hold		Swing	−6.1	

=== Mallee ===
1977 South Australian state election: Mallee
Party	Candidate	Votes	%	±%
Liberal	Bill Nankivell	8,684	60.5	+6.4
Labor	Gerald Lea	3,353	23.3	+4.4
National	Leslie Ficken	2,329	16.2	+2.4
Total formal votes		14,366	98.1	
Informal votes		283	1.9	
Turnout		14,649	94.4	
Two-party-preferred result
Liberal	Bill Nankivell	10,611	73.8	−2.6
Labor	Gerald Lea	3,755	26.2	+2.6
Liberal hold		Swing	−2.6	

=== Mawson ===
1977 South Australian state election: Mawson
Party	Candidate	Votes	%	±%
Labor	Leslie Drury	9,428	51.8	+1.1
Liberal	Tony Boyle	6,858	37.6	+18.0
Democrats	Charles Ferdinands	1,924	10.6	+10.6
Total formal votes		18,210	98.4	
Informal votes		295	1.6	
Turnout		18,505	95.7	
Two-party-preferred result
Labor	Leslie Drury	10,283	56.5	+1.3
Liberal	Tony Boyle	7,927	43.5	+43.5
Labor hold		Swing	N/A	

=== Mitcham ===
1977 South Australian state election: Mitcham
Party	Candidate	Votes	%	±%
Liberal	Robert Worth	6,663	41.8	+14.1
Democrats	Robin Millhouse	5,146	32.3	+32.3
Labor	Rosemary Crowley	4,130	25.9	−3.2
Total formal votes		15,939	99.0	
Informal votes		166	1.0	
Turnout		16,105	93.0	
Two-candidate-preferred result
Democrats	Robin Millhouse	9,002	56.5	+56.5
Liberal	Robert Worth	6,937	43.5	+43.5
Democrats gain from Liberal Movement		Swing	N/A	

=== Mitchell ===
1977 South Australian state election: Mitchell
Party	Candidate	Votes	%	±%
Labor	Ron Payne	8,952	56.1	+1.9
Liberal	June Schaeffer	5,046	31.6	+7.6
Democrats	Kevin Whitby	1,566	9.8	+9.8
Independent	Peter Amor	250	1.6	+1.6
Workers	John Pocius	137	0.9	+0.9
Total formal votes		15,951	97.8	
Informal votes		351	2.2	
Turnout		16,302	93.5	
Two-party-preferred result
Labor	Ron Payne	9,794	61.4	+1.6
Liberal	June Schaeffer	6,157	38.6	−1.6
Labor hold		Swing	+1.6	

=== Morphett ===
1977 South Australian state election: Morphett
Party	Candidate	Votes	%	±%
Labor	Terry Groom	7,581	47.5	+5.2
Liberal	Mark Hamilton	7,026	44.0	+5.3
Democrats	Margaret Sesr	1,361	8.5	+8.5
Total formal votes		15,968	98.0	
Informal votes		333	2.0	
Turnout		16,301	93.2	
Two-party-preferred result
Labor	Terry Groom	8,040	50.3	+5.2
Liberal	Mark Hamilton	7,928	49.7	−5.2
Labor gain from Liberal		Swing	+5.2	

=== Mount Gambier ===
1977 South Australian state election: Mount Gambier
Party	Candidate	Votes	%	±%
Liberal	Harold Allison	8,181	51.4	+13.7
Labor	James Hennessy	7,726	48.6	+7.3
Total formal votes		15,907	98.1	
Informal votes		308	1.9	
Turnout		16,215	94.9	
Liberal hold		Swing	−1.7	

=== Murray ===
1977 South Australian state election: Murray
Party	Candidate	Votes	%	±%
Labor	Douglas Gerrie	5,734	35.9	+1.8
Liberal	David Wotton	5,121	32.0	−20.2
Independent Liberal	Ivon Wardle	4,886	30.6	+30.6
Independent	Maurice Thiele	243	1.5	+1.5
Total formal votes		15,984	98.1	
Informal votes		305	1.9	
Turnout		16,289	93.9	
Two-party-preferred result
Liberal	David Wotton	9,595	60.0	−3.0
Labor	Douglas Gerrie	6,389	40.0	+3.0
Liberal hold		Swing	−3.0	

=== Napier ===
1977 South Australian state election: Napier
Party	Candidate	Votes	%	±%
Labor	Terry Hemmings	10,350	71.0	+3.3
Liberal	Elizabeth Pooley	4,238	29.0	+10.9
Total formal votes		14,588	95.2	
Informal votes		727	4.8	
Turnout		15,315	91.6	
Labor hold		Swing	+1.2	

=== Newland ===
1977 South Australian state election: Newland
Party	Candidate	Votes	%	±%
Labor	John Klunder	9,437	53.7	+0.1
Liberal	Emily Perry	5,774	32.9	+9.0
Democrats	Betty Knott	2,345	13.4	+13.4
Total formal votes		17,556	97.9	
Informal votes		380	2.1	
Turnout		17,936	94.2	
Two-party-preferred result
Labor	John Klunder	10,350	59.8	+2.3
Liberal	Emily Perry	7,056	40.2	−2.3
Labor hold		Swing	+2.3	

=== Norwood ===
1977 South Australian state election: Norwood
Party	Candidate	Votes	%	±%
Labor	Don Dunstan	9,361	60.2	+4.6
Liberal	William Zacharia	6,181	39.8	+8.2
Total formal votes		15,542	96.8	
Informal votes		505	3.2	
Turnout		16,047	90.5	
Labor hold		Swing	+2.7	

=== Peake ===
1977 South Australian state election: Peake
Party	Candidate	Votes	%	±%
Labor	Don Simmons	10,325	67.4	+6.7
Liberal	Mark Tregoning	4,989	32.6	+11.4
Total formal votes		15,314	96.2	
Informal votes		607	3.8	
Turnout		15,921	92.9	
Labor hold		Swing	+4.0	

=== Playford ===
1977 South Australian state election: Playford
Party	Candidate	Votes	%	±%
Labor	Terry McRae	10,011	60.6	+1.9
Liberal	John McGowan	4,052	24.5	+8.5
Democrats	John Longhurst	2,271	13.7	+13.7
Communist	Donald Sutherland	195	1.2	+1.2
Total formal votes		16,529	97.1	
Informal votes		492	2.9	
Turnout		17,021	93.9	
Two-party-preferred result
Labor	Terry McRae	11,080	65.1	+1.8
Liberal	John McGowan	5,449	34.9	−1.8
Labor hold		Swing	+1.8	

=== Price ===
1977 South Australian state election: Price
Party	Candidate	Votes	%	±%
Labor	George Whitten	10,304	69.4	+8.8
Liberal	Jean Lawrie	4,545	30.6	+8.0
Total formal votes		14,849	95.6	
Informal votes		676	4.4	
Turnout		15,525	93.2	
Labor hold		Swing	+6.3	

=== Rocky River ===
}

1977 South Australian state election: Rocky River
Party	Candidate	Votes	%	±%
Liberal	Howard Venning	6,344	40.2	+2.1
Labor	Ted Connelly	6,121	38.8	+11.0
National	Peter Longmire	1,908	12.0	−8.7
Independent	Nevin Newbold	1,417	9.0	+9.0
Total formal votes		15,790	98.6	
Informal votes		219	1.4	
Turnout		18,009	95.4	
Two-party-preferred result
Liberal	Howard Venning	9,193	58.2	−7.1
Labor	Ted Connelly	6,597	41.8	+7.1
Liberal hold		Swing	−7.1	

=== Ross Smith ===
1977 South Australian state election: Ross Smith
Party	Candidate	Votes	%	±%
Labor	John Bannon	10,773	72.2	+7.2
Liberal	Paul Baloglou	4,156	27.8	+9.2
Total formal votes		14,929	96.2	
Informal votes		594	3.8	
Turnout		15,523	94.2	
Labor hold		Swing	+4.7	

=== Salisbury ===
1977 South Australian state election: Salisbury
Party	Candidate	Votes	%	±%
Labor	Reg Groth	12,150	69.5	+7.1
Liberal	Ann Allen	5,333	30.5	+10.4
Total formal votes		17,483	95.0	
Informal votes		919	5.0	
Turnout		18,402	93.2	
Labor hold		Swing	+4.5	

=== Semaphore ===
1977 South Australian state election: Semaphore
Party	Candidate	Votes	%	±%
Labor	Jack Olson	11,601	70.8	+0.3
Liberal	Terence Hanson	4,447	27.1	+11.1
Socialist	J Mitchell	343	2.1	+2.1
Total formal votes		16,391	97.1	
Informal votes		481	2.9	
Turnout		16,872	93.2	
Two-party-preferred result
Labor	Jack Olson	11,833	72.2	−0.3
Liberal	Terence Hanson	4,558	27.8	+0.3
Labor hold		Swing	−0.3	

=== Spence ===
1977 South Australian state election: Spence
Party	Candidate	Votes	%	±%
Labor	Roy Abbott	11,307	77.3	+6.3
Liberal	George Basivovs	3,316	22.7	+6.4
Total formal votes		14,623	95.7	
Informal votes		658	4.3	
Turnout		15,281	93.1	
Labor hold		Swing	+4.4	

=== Stuart ===
1977 South Australian state election: Stuart
Party	Candidate	Votes	%	±%
Labor	Gavin Keneally	11,295	73.9	+27.0
Liberal	Colin Struck	3,985	26.1	+14.3
Total formal votes		15,280	96.6	
Informal votes		530	3.4	
Turnout		15,810	94.0	
Labor hold		Swing	N/A	

=== Todd ===
1977 South Australian state election: Todd
Party	Candidate	Votes	%	±%
Labor	Molly Byrne	9,273	56.5	+1.9
Liberal	Robert Ritson	7,136	43.5	+21.2
Total formal votes		16,409	97.6	
Informal votes		407	2.4	
Turnout		16,816	95.0	
Labor hold		Swing	−1.9	

=== Torrens ===
1977 South Australian state election: Torrens
Party	Candidate	Votes	%	±%
Liberal	Michael Wilson	7,819	50.5	+10.7
Labor	Ralph Clarke	7,138	46.2	+5.8
Workers	Leslie Huxley	514	3.3	+3.3
Total formal votes		15,471	97.7	
Informal votes		362	2.3	
Turnout		15,833	90.3	
Two-party-preferred result
Liberal	Michael Wilson	8,119	52.5	−4.1
Labor	Ralph Clarke	7,347	47.5	+4.1
Liberal hold		Swing	−4.1	

=== Unley ===
1977 South Australian state election: Unley
Party	Candidate	Votes	%	±%
Labor	Gil Langley	8,848	58.9	+6.8
Liberal	Craig Spiel	5,707	38.0	−6.8
Independent	Victoria Wawryk	466	3.1	+3.1
Total formal votes		15,021	97.5	
Informal votes		389	2.5	
Turnout		15,410	90.2	
Two-party-preferred result
Labor	Gil Langley	9,022	60.1	+4.6
Liberal	Craig Spiel	5,999	39.9	−4.6
Labor hold		Swing	+4.6	

=== Victoria ===
1977 South Australian state election: Victoria
Party	Candidate	Votes	%	±%
Liberal	Allan Rodda	9,285	65.3	+12.9
Labor	Graeme Richardson	4,923	34.7	+8.4
Total formal votes		14,208	97.9	
Informal votes		306	2.1	
Turnout		14,514	93.8	
Liberal hold		Swing	−5.1	

=== Whyalla ===
1977 South Australian state election: Whyalla
Party	Candidate	Votes	%	±%
Labor	Max Brown	11,203	73.2	+5.0
Liberal	Vivienne Cruickshank	4,102	26.8	+8.9
Total formal votes		15,305	96.1	
Informal votes		615	3.9	
Turnout		15,920	93.7	
Labor hold		Swing	+2.9	

== See also ==
- Candidates of the 1977 South Australian state election
- Members of the South Australian House of Assembly, 1977–1979
