= Members of the South Australian House of Assembly, 1977–1979 =

This is a list of members of the South Australian House of Assembly from 1977 to 1979, as elected at the 1977 state election:

Name	Party	Electorate	Term of office
Roy Abbott	Labor	Spence	1975–1989
Jennifer Adamson	Liberal	Coles	1977–1993
Harold Allison	Liberal	Mount Gambier	1975–1997
Peter Arnold	Liberal	Chaffey	1968–1970, 1973–1993
John Bannon	Labor	Ross Smith	1977–1993
Heini Becker	Liberal	Hanson	1970–1997
Peter Blacker	NCP	Flinders	1973–1993
Hon Glen Broomhill	Labor	Henley Beach	1965–1979
Dean Brown	Liberal	Davenport	1973–1985, 1992–2006
Max Brown	Labor	Whyalla	1970–1985
Molly Byrne	Labor	Todd	1965–1979
Ted Chapman	Liberal	Alexandra	1973–1992
Hon Des Corcoran	Labor	Hartley	1962–1968, 1968–1982
Greg Crafter ^{[1]}	Labor	Norwood	1979, 1980–1993
Leslie Drury	Labor	Mawson	1977–1979
Hon Peter Duncan	Labor	Elizabeth	1973–1984
Hon Don Dunstan ^{[1]}	Labor	Norwood	1953–1979
Bruce Eastick	Liberal	Light	1970–1993
Stan Evans	Liberal	Fisher	1968–1993
Roger Goldsworthy	Liberal	Kavel	1970–1992
Terry Groom	Labor	Morphett	1977–1979, 1982–1993
Reg Groth	Labor	Salisbury	1970–1979
Graham Gunn	Liberal	Eyre	1970–2010
Charles Harrison	Labor	Albert Park	1970–1979
Terry Hemmings	Labor	Napier	1977–1993
Hon Dr Don Hopgood	Labor	Baudin	1970–1993
Hon Hugh Hudson	Labor	Brighton	1965–1979
Gavin Keneally	Labor	Stuart	1970–1989
John Klunder	Labor	Newland	1977–1979, 1982–1993
Gil Langley	Labor	Unley	1962–1982
John Mathwin	Liberal	Glenelg	1970–1985
Terry McRae	Labor	Playford	1970–1989
Robin Millhouse	Democrat	Mitcham	1955–1982
Jack Olson	Labor	Semaphore	1973–1979
Hon Ron Payne	Labor	Mitchell	1970–1989
Allan Rodda	Liberal	Victoria	1965–1985
Keith Russack	Liberal	Goyder	1973–1982
Hon Don Simmons	Labor	Peake	1970–1979
Jack Slater	Labor	Gilles	1970–1989
Dr David Tonkin	Liberal	Bragg	1970–1983
Howard Venning	Liberal	Rocky River	1968–1979
Hon Geoff Virgo	Labor	Ascot Park	1968–1979
Charles Wells	Labor	Florey	1970–1979
George Whitten	Labor	Price	1975–1985
Michael Wilson	Liberal	Torrens	1977–1985
David Wotton	Liberal	Murray	1975–2002
Hon Jack Wright	Labor	Adelaide	1971–1985

^{1} The Labor member for Norwood and outgoing Premier of South Australia, Don Dunstan, resigned due to ill health on 15 February 1979. Labor candidate Greg Crafter won the resulting by-election on 10 March 1979.
