= Electoral results for the district of Rocky River =

South Australian district election results

This is a list of election results for the electoral district of Rocky River in South Australian elections.

== Members for Rocky River ==
Member	Party	Term
John Lyons	Liberal and Country	1938–1948
James Heaslip	Liberal and Country	1949–1968
Howard Venning	Liberal and Country	1968–1974
Howard Venning	Liberal	1974–1979
John Olsen	Liberal	1979–1985

== Election results ==
=== Elections in the 1980s ===
1982 South Australian state election: Rocky River
Party	Candidate	Votes	%	±%
Liberal	John Olsen	8,943	56.4	+7.3
Labor	Denis Crisp	6,043	38.1	+4.1
National	John Reilly	522	3.3	−13.6
Democrats	Gordon Weber	354	2.2	+2.2
Total formal votes		15,862	96.2	−0.5
Informal votes		625	3.8	+0.5
Turnout		16,487	94.7	+0.2
Two-party-preferred result
Liberal	John Olsen	9,566	60.3	−2.8
Labor	Denis Crisp	6,296	39.7	+2.8
Liberal hold		Swing	−2.8	

=== Elections in the 1970s ===
1979 South Australian state election: Rocky River
Party	Candidate	Votes	%	±%
Liberal	John Olsen	7,672	49.1	−8.9
Labor	Denis Crisp	5,299	34.0	−4.8
National Country	Helen Tiller	2,639	16.9	+4.9
Total formal votes		15,610	96.7	−1.9
Informal votes		525	3.3	+1.9
Turnout		16,135	94.5	−0.9
Two-party-preferred result
Liberal	John Olsen	9,849	63.1	+4.9
Labor	Denis Crisp	5,761	36.9	−4.9
Liberal hold		Swing	+4.9	

}

1977 South Australian state election: Rocky River
Party	Candidate	Votes	%	±%
Liberal	Howard Venning	6,344	40.2	+2.1
Labor	Ted Connelly	6,121	38.8	+11.0
National	Peter Longmire	1,908	12.0	−8.7
Independent	Nevin Newbold	1,417	9.0	+9.0
Total formal votes		15,790	98.6	
Informal votes		219	1.4	
Turnout		18,009	95.4	
Two-party-preferred result
Liberal	Howard Venning	9,193	58.2	−7.1
Labor	Ted Connelly	6,597	41.8	+7.1
Liberal hold		Swing	−7.1	

1975 South Australian state election: Rocky River
Party	Candidate	Votes	%	±%
Liberal	Howard Venning	4,151	42.2	−5.6
National	Ian Bruce	3,018	30.7	+1.5
Labor	Hank Van Galen	1,785	18.2	−4.8
Liberal Movement	Clement Hampton	878	8.9	+8.9
Total formal votes		9,832	98.0	−0.1
Informal votes		198	2.0	+0.1
Turnout		10,030	96.5	+0.6
Two-candidate-preferred result
Liberal	Howard Venning	5,984	60.9	+10.7
National	Ian Bruce	3,848	39.1	−10.7
Liberal hold		Swing	+10.7	

1973 South Australian state election: Rocky River
Party	Candidate	Votes	%	±%
Liberal and Country	Howard Venning	4,454	47.8	−8.5
Country	Peter Longmire	2,716	29.2	+13.6
Labor	Nathan Smith	2,147	23.0	−5.1
Total formal votes		9,317	97.9	−0.8
Informal votes		201	2.1	+0.8
Turnout		9,518	95.9	−0.2
Two-candidate-preferred result
Liberal and Country	Howard Venning	4,680	50.2	−20.1
Country	Peter Longmire	4,637	49.8	+49.8
Liberal and Country hold		Swing	N/A	

1970 South Australian state election: Rocky River
Party	Candidate	Votes	%	±%
Liberal and Country	Howard Venning	5,205	56.3	
Labor	Nathan Smith	2,602	28.1	
National	Jack Groves	1,446	15.6	
Total formal votes		9,253	98.7	
Informal votes		120	1.3	
Turnout		9,373	96.1	
Two-party-preferred result
Liberal and Country	Howard Venning	6,506	70.3	
Labor	Nathan Smith	2,747	29.7	
Liberal and Country hold		Swing		

=== Elections in the 1960s ===
1968 South Australian state election: Rocky River
Party	Candidate	Votes	%	±%
Liberal and Country	Howard Venning	3,671	70.1	+3.5
Labor	James Dunford	1,565	29.9	−3.5
Total formal votes		5,236	97.9	−0.4
Informal votes		110	2.1	+0.4
Turnout		5,346	96.4	−0.1
Liberal and Country hold		Swing	+3.5	

1965 South Australian state election: Rocky River
Party	Candidate	Votes	%	±%
Liberal and Country	James Heaslip	3,652	66.6	−33.4
Labor	George Smart	1,832	33.4	+33.4
Total formal votes		5,484	98.3	
Informal votes		96	1.7	
Turnout		5,580	96.5	
Liberal and Country hold		Swing	N/A	

1962 South Australian state election: Rocky River
Party	Candidate	Votes	%	±%
Liberal and Country	James Heaslip	unopposed		
Liberal and Country hold		Swing		

=== Elections in the 1950s ===
1959 South Australian state election: Rocky River
Party	Candidate	Votes	%	±%
Liberal and Country	James Heaslip	unopposed		
Liberal and Country hold		Swing		

1956 South Australian state election: Rocky River
Party	Candidate	Votes	%	±%
Liberal and Country	James Heaslip	unopposed		
Liberal and Country hold		Swing		

1953 South Australian state election: Rocky River
Party	Candidate	Votes	%	±%
Liberal and Country	James Heaslip	unopposed		
Liberal and Country hold		Swing		

1950 South Australian state election: Rocky River
Party	Candidate	Votes	%	±%
Liberal and Country	James Heaslip	unopposed		
Liberal and Country hold		Swing		

=== Elections in the 1940s ===
1947 South Australian state election: Rocky River
Party	Candidate	Votes	%	±%
Liberal and Country	John Lyons	unopposed		
Liberal and Country hold		Swing		

1944 South Australian state election: Rocky River
Party	Candidate	Votes	%	±%
Liberal and Country	John Lyons	3,091	71.4	−1.0
Labor	Leonard Wilcott	1,237	28.6	+1.0
Total formal votes		4,328	96.9	−1.1
Informal votes		136	3.1	+1.1
Turnout		4,464	89.8	+28.2
Liberal and Country hold		Swing	−1.0	

1941 South Australian state election: Rocky River
Party	Candidate	Votes	%	±%
Liberal and Country	John Lyons	2,256	72.4	+22.2
Labor	John Henry Jenner	860	27.6	+10.2
Total formal votes		3,116	98.0	−0.4
Informal votes		65	2.0	+0.4
Turnout		3,181	61.6	−16.9
Liberal and Country hold		Swing	N/A	

=== Elections in the 1930s ===
1938 South Australian state election: Rocky River
Party	Candidate	Votes	%	±%
Liberal and Country	John Lyons	2,041	50.2	
Independent	Michael Noonan	712	17.5	
Labor	Edgar Russell	707	17.4	
Independent	William Nicholls	603	14.8	
Total formal votes		4,063	98.4	
Informal votes		66	1.6	
Turnout		4,129	78.5	
Liberal and Country hold		Swing		

- Preferences were not distributed.
