= Candidates of the 1977 South Australian state election =

The 1977 South Australian state election was held on 17 September 1977.

The Liberal Movement had dissolved since the previous election, with some of its members rejoining the Liberal Party and others forming part of the new Australian Democrats. For the two sitting LM members, their seats are listed as held by the LM.

== Retiring Members ==
=== Labor ===
- Jack Jennings MHA (Ross Smith)

=== Liberal ===
- Ernest Allen MHA (Frome)
- John Coumbe MHA (Torrens)
- Murray Vandepeer MHA (Millicent)

== House of Assembly ==
Sitting members are shown in bold text. Successful candidates are highlighted in the relevant colour. Where there is possible confusion, an asterisk (*) is also used.

Electorate	Held by	Labor candidate	Liberal candidate	Democrats candidate	Other candidates
Adelaide	Labor	**Jack Wright**	Terry McClean		
Albert Park	Labor	**Charles Harrison**	Glendon Stotter		
Alexandra	Liberal	Kenneth Jared	**Ted Chapman**	Kaye Gibbs	
Ascot Park	Labor	**Geoff Virgo**	Dean Le Poidevin	Kenneth Johnson	
Baudin	Labor	**Don Hopgood**	Mervyn Sawade		
Bragg	Liberal	Kevin Winn	**David Tonkin**		
Brighton	Labor	**Hugh Hudson**	Natalie Richardson	Ronald Moulds	
Chaffey	Liberal	John Howe	**Peter Arnold**		
Coles	Liberal	Greg Crafter	Jennifer Adamson		
Davenport	Liberal	Terry Cameron	**Dean Brown**	Michael Lee	Ewan Hutchison (WP)
Elizabeth	Labor	**Peter Duncan**	Anthony Hutton		
Eyre	Liberal	Barry Piltz; Michael Sachsse	**Graham Gunn**		
Fisher	Liberal	Sean Dawes	**Stan Evans**		
Flinders	NCP	Terrence Krieg	Victor Gerschwitz		**Peter Blacker** (NCP)
Florey	Labor	**Charles Wells**	John Wadey		
Gilles	Labor	**Jack Slater**	Lois Bell	Andrew Graham	
Glenelg	Liberal	Barbara Wiese	**John Mathwin**		
Goyder	LM	Roger Thomas	**David Boundy**		**Keith Russack** (Ind Lib)
Hanson	Liberal	Reece Jennings	**Heini Becker**		
Hartley	Labor	**Des Corcoran**	George Trotta		William Forster (WP)
Henley Beach	Labor	**Glen Broomhill**	Barry Lawson		
Kavel	Liberal	Sydney Tilmouth	**Roger Goldsworthy**	Reginald Goldsworthy	
Light	Liberal	James Reese	**Bruce Eastick**		
Mallee	Liberal	Gerald Lea	**Bill Nankivell**		Leslie Ficken (NCP)
Mawson	Labor	Leslie Drury	Tony Boyle	Charles Ferdinands	
Mitcham	LM	Rosemary Crowley	Robert Worth	**Robin Millhouse**	
Mitchell	Labor	**Ron Payne**	June Schaeffer	Kevin Whitby	Peter Amor (Ind); John Pocius (WP)
Morphett	Liberal	Terry Groom	Mark Hamilton	Margaret Sesr	
Mount Gambier	Liberal	James Hennessy	**Harold Allison**		
Murray	Liberal	Douglas Gerrie	**David Wotton**		Maurice Thiele (Ind); **Ivon Wardle** (Ind Lib)
Napier	Labor	Terry Hemmings	Elizabeth Pooley		
Newland	Labor	John Klunder	Emily Perry	Betty Knott	
Norwood	Labor	**Don Dunstan**	William Zacharia		
Peake	Labor	**Don Simmons**	Mark Tregoning		
Playford	Labor	**Terry McRae**	John McGowan	John Longhurst	Donald Sutherland (CPA)
Price	Labor	**George Whitten**	Jean Lawrie		
Rocky River	Liberal	**Ted Connelly**	**Howard Venning**		Peter Longmire (NCP); Nevin Newbold (Ind)
Ross Smith	Labor	John Bannon	Paul Baloglou		
Salisbury	Labor	**Reg Groth**	Ann Allen		
Semaphore	Labor	**Jack Olson**	Terence Hanson		J Mitchell (SPA)
Spence	Labor	**Roy Abbott**	George Basisovs		
Stuart	Labor	**Gavin Keneally**	Colin Struck		
Todd	Labor	**Molly Byrne**	Robert Ritson		
Torrens	Liberal	Ralph Clarke	Michael Wilson		Leslie Huxley (WP)
Unley	Labor	**Gil Langley**	Craig Spiel		Victoria Wawryk (Ind)
Victoria	Liberal	Graeme Richardson	**Allan Rodda**		
Whyalla	Labor	**Max Brown**	Vivienne Cruickshank		
