= Electoral results for the district of Ascot Park =

Election results in South Australia

This is a list of election results for the Electoral district of Ascot Park in South Australian elections.

== Members for Ascot Park ==
Member	Party	Term
Geoff Virgo	Labor	1970–1979
John Trainer	Labor	1979–1985

== Election results ==
=== Elections in the 1980s ===
1982 South Australian state election: Ascot Park
Party	Candidate	Votes	%	±%
Labor	John Trainer	8,409	56.2	+8.2
Liberal	Chris Gellie	5,613	37.5	−4.0
Democrats	Michael Rogers	938	6.3	−4.2
Total formal votes		14,960	94.7	−1.0
Informal votes		835	5.3	+1.0
Turnout		15,795	94.3	+0.7
Two-party-preferred result
Labor	John Trainer	8,878	59.3	+7.6
Liberal	Chris Gellie	6,082	40.7	−7.6
Labor hold		Swing	+7.6	

=== Elections in the 1970s ===
1979 South Australian state election: Ascot Park
Party	Candidate	Votes	%	±%
Labor	John Trainer	7,066	48.0	−11.2
Liberal	Frank Chapman	6,116	41.5	+12.4
Democrats	Kenneth Johnson	1,549	10.5	−1.2
Total formal votes		14,731	95.7	−2.4
Informal votes		656	4.3	+2.4
Turnout		15,387	93.6	−0.7
Two-party-preferred result
Labor	John Trainer	7,609	51.7	−12.1
Liberal	Frank Chapman	7,122	48.3	+12.1
Labor hold		Swing	−12.1	

1977 South Australian state election: Ascot Park
Party	Candidate	Votes	%	±%
Labor	Geoff Virgo	9,331	59.2	+1.1
Liberal	Dean Le Poidevin	4,594	29.1	+5.3
Democrats	Kenneth Johnson	1,845	11.7	+11.7
Total formal votes		15,770	98.1	
Informal votes		299	1.9	
Turnout		16,069	94.3	
Two-party-preferred result
Labor	Geoff Virgo	9,856	62.5	+1.7
Liberal	Dean Le Poidevin	5,914	37.5	−1.7
Labor hold		Swing	+1.7	

1975 South Australian state election: Ascot Park
Party	Candidate	Votes	%	±%
Labor	Geoff Virgo	8,925	58.1	−6.6
Liberal	George Basisovs	3,649	23.8	−11.5
Liberal Movement	Dorothy Heide	2,787	18.1	+18.1
Total formal votes		15,361	96.5	−0.2
Informal votes		558	3.5	+0.2
Turnout		15,919	94.2	−0.6
Two-party-preferred result
Labor	Geoff Virgo	9,201	59.9	−4.8
Liberal	George Basisovs	6,160	40.1	+4.8
Labor hold		Swing	−4.8	

1973 South Australian state election: Ascot Park
Party	Candidate	Votes	%	±%
Labor	Geoff Virgo	9,685	64.7	+1.5
Liberal and Country	John Forgan	5,289	35.3	−1.5
Total formal votes		14,974	96.7	−1.7
Informal votes		506	3.3	+1.7
Turnout		15,480	94.8	−1.2
Labor hold		Swing	+1.5	

1970 South Australian state election: Ascot Park
Party	Candidate	Votes	%	±%
Labor	Geoff Virgo	9,455	63.2	
Liberal and Country	Maurice Senior	5,514	36.8	
Total formal votes		14,969	98.4	
Informal votes		244	1.6	
Turnout		15,213	96.0	
Labor hold		Swing		
