= Electoral results for the district of Walsh =

South Australian district election results

This is a list of election results for the electoral district of Walsh in South Australian elections.

== Members for Walsh ==
Member	Party	Term
John Trainer	Labor	1985–1993

== Election results ==
=== Elections in the 1980s ===
1989 South Australian state election: Walsh
Party	Candidate	Votes	%	±%
Labor	John Trainer	8,520	50.4	−6.3
Liberal	Douglas Rowe	6,623	39.1	+4.8
Democrats	Richard Bennett	1,776	10.5	+6.7
Total formal votes		16,919	96.9	+2.5
Informal votes		542	3.1	−2.5
Turnout		17,461	94.5	+0.1
Two-party-preferred result
Labor	John Trainer	9,532	56.3	−4.4
Liberal	Douglas Rowe	7,387	43.7	+4.4
Labor hold		Swing	−4.4	

1985 South Australian state election: Walsh
Party	Candidate	Votes	%	±%
Labor	John Trainer	9,422	56.7	+2.7
Liberal	Lenore Triplow	5,709	34.3	−4.7
Independent	Reece Jennings	868	5.2	+5.2
Democrats	Helen Brasted	629	3.8	−3.2
Total formal votes		16,628	94.4	
Informal votes		980	5.6	
Turnout		17,608	92.7	
Two-party-preferred result
Labor	John Trainer	10,091	60.7	+2.7
Liberal	Lenore Triplow	6,537	39.3	−2.7
Labor hold		Swing	+2.7	
