= 1977 South Australian state election =

- 17 September 1977

All 47 seats in the South Australian House of Assembly 24 seats were needed for a majority
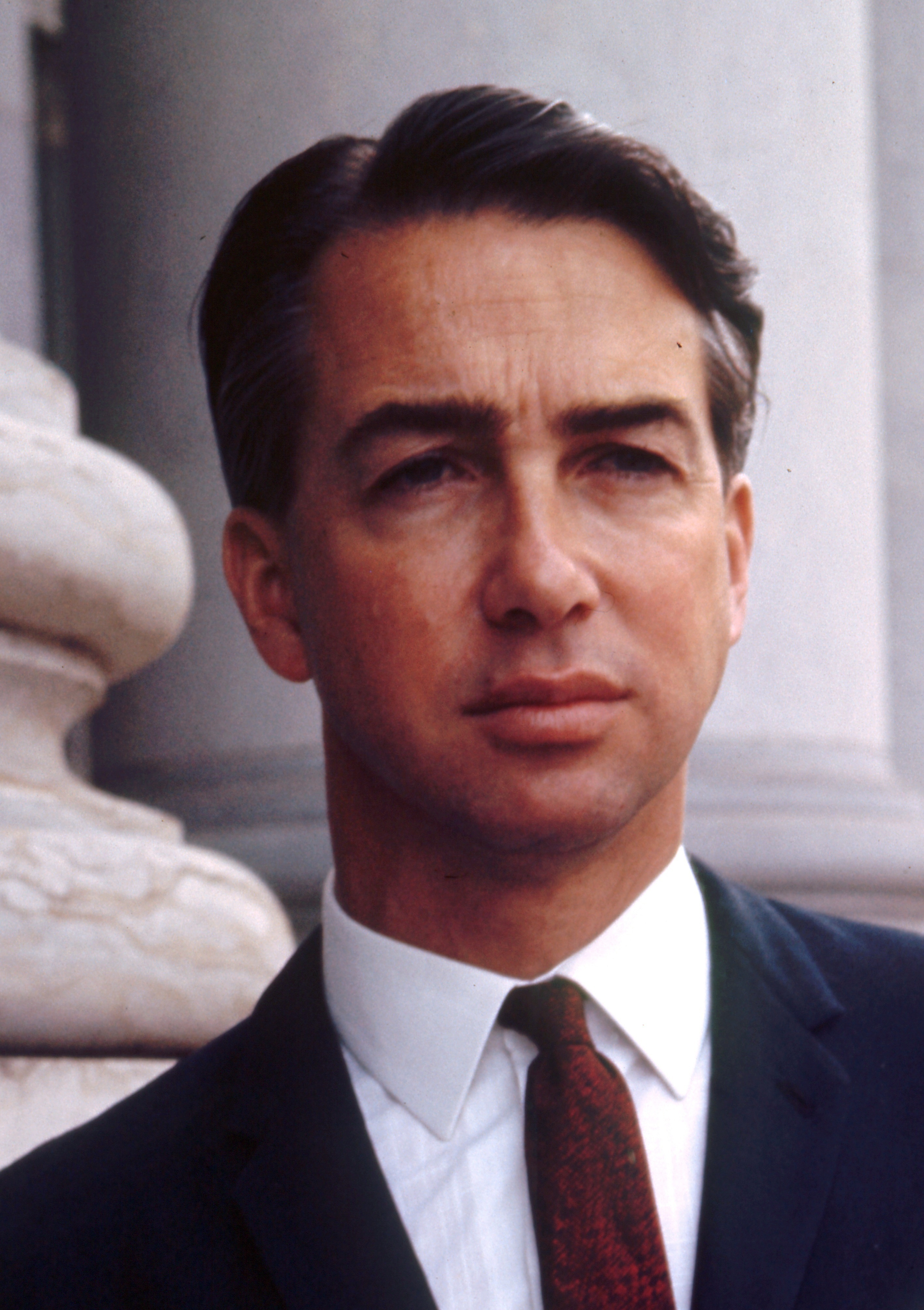

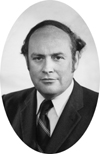
	First party	Second party	Third party
			DEM
Leader	Don Dunstan	David Tonkin	Robin Millhouse
Party	Labor	Liberal	Democrats
Leader since	1 June 1967	24 July 1975
Leader's seat	Norwood	Bragg	Mitcham
Seats before	23	21	0
Seats won	27	17	1
Seat change	▲4	▼4	▲1
Popular vote	383,831	306,356	25,855
Percentage	51.64%	41.21%	3.48%
Swing	▲5.31	▲9.68	New
TPP	53.40%	46.60%
TPP swing	▲4.20	▼4.20
	Fourth party
	NAT
Leader	Peter Blacker
Party	National
Leader's seat	Flinders
Seats before	1
Seats won	1
Seat change	Steady
Popular vote	11,825
Percentage	1.59%
Swing	▼1.18
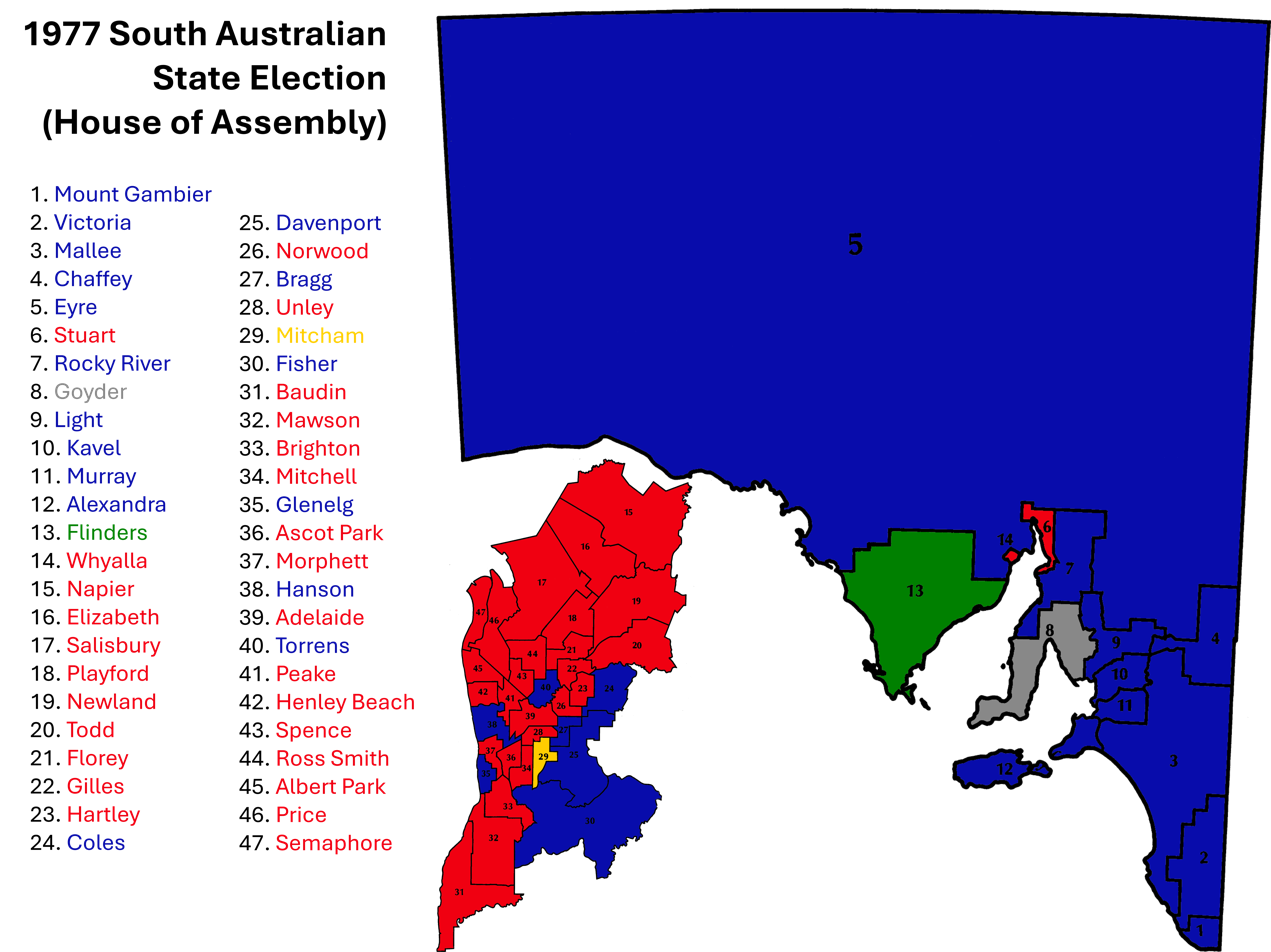
- Results by electoral division.
Premier before election
Don Dunstan
Labor
Elected Premier
Don Dunstan
Labor

State elections were held in South Australia on 17 September 1977. All 47 seats in the South Australian House of Assembly were up for election. The incumbent Australian Labor Party led by Premier of South Australia Don Dunstan won a fourth term in government, defeating the Liberal Party of Australia led by Leader of the Opposition David Tonkin.

== Background ==
Parliamentary elections for the lower house of the Parliament of South Australia were held in South Australia in 1977. There was no election for Legislative Council; and as of 2026, this is the most recent South Australian election which has not been for both houses.

The Labor Party led by Don Dunstan, which had won the previous three elections in 1970, 1973 and 1975, defeated the Liberal Party of Australia opposition led by David Tonkin. It was the first time that a Labor government in South Australia had been re-elected for a fourth term, and would be the first nine-year-incumbent Labor government. This would be Dunstan's last election before resigning due to ill health in 1979.

This was the first election after the end of Playmander seat weighting where one vote one value was introduced. At the previous election some metropolitan seats still saw more than three times the number of voters than in some rural seats, despite most of the Playmander being abolished nearly a decade ago. The redistribution was the reason Dunstan called an early election.

The Australian Democrats ran for the first time under a joint New LM-Australian Democrats ticket, winning an average 12.3 percent of the primary vote in the 12 electorates they contested, with former LCL MP Robin Millhouse retaining his seat of Mitcham, which he would hold until 1982.

== Key dates ==
- Issue of writ: 25 August 1977
- Close of nominations: 2 September 1977
- Polling day: 19 September 1977
- Return of writ: On or before 3 October 1977

== Results ==
Arrangement of the House of Assembly after the 1977 state election.

Keith Russack stood as an Independent Liberal, but later joined the Liberal Party; giving the numbers: 27 Labor, 18 Liberal, 1 Country Party, 1 Australian Democrat.

A 1979 Norwood by-election was triggered as a result of Dunstan's resignation. Labor retained the seat on a considerably reduced majority.

South Australian state election, 17 September 1977 House of Assembly << 1975–1979 >>
Enrolled voters	818,341				
Votes cast	764,077		Turnout	93.37	-0.19
Informal votes	20,743		Informal	2.71	-1.14
Summary of votes by party
Party	Primary votes	%	Swing	Seats	Change
Labor	383,831	51.64	+5.31	27	+ 4
Liberal	306,356	41.21	+9.68	17	– 3
Democrats	25,855	3.48	*	1	– 1
National Country	11,855	1.59	-1.18	1	± 0
Independent Liberal	10,793	1.45	*	1	+ 1
Independent	2,914	0.39	-0.51	0	– 1
Other	1,730	0.23	*	0	± 0
Total	743,334			47	
Two-party-preferred
Labor	396,957	53.40	+4.20		
Liberal	346,372	46.60	–4.20		

== Seats changing party representation ==
This table lists changes in party representation at the 1977 election.

Seat	Incumbent member	Party	New member	Party
Baudin	New seat		Don Hopgood	Labor
Frome	Ernest Allen	Liberal	Seat abolished	
Gouger	Keith Russack*	Liberal	Seat abolished	
Goyder	David Boundy*	Liberal	Keith Russack	Independent
Hartley	New seat		Des Corcoran	Labor
Heysen	David Wotton*	Liberal	Seat abolished	
Millicent	Murray Vandepeer	Liberal	Seat abolished	
Mitcham	Robin Millhouse*	Liberal Movement	Robin Millhouse	Democrats
Morphett	New seat		Terry Groom	Labor
Napier	New seat		Terry Hemmings	Labor
Newland	New seat		John Klunder	Labor
Pirie	Ted Connelly*	Labor	Seat abolished	
Tea Tree Gully	Molly Byrne*	Labor	Seat abolished	
Todd	New seat		Molly Byrne	Labor

- Members listed in italics did not recontest this election.
- Keith Russack was the sitting Liberal member for the abolished district of Gouger. He was not pre-selected for any seat in the redistribution, so he quit the party and ran as an Independent candidate for the seat of Goyder.
- David Boundy was elected as a Liberal Movement member for Goyder, but joined the Liberal party in 1976. He was defeated by Keith Russack, who re-joined the Liberal party after being elected.
- Sitting Liberal MP for the abolished district of Heysen, David Wotton was preselected for the district of Murray over incumbent MP Ivon Wardle. Wardle contested the election as an Independent, but was defeated by Wotton.
- Robin Millhouse was elected in 1975 as Liberal Movement member for Mitcham. He joined the Democrats in 1977 and won a second term to his seat.
- Ted Connelly was elected as an Independent MP for the abolished district of Pirie in 1975, but later joined the Labor party. He contested the seat of Rocky River and lost.
- Sitting Labor MP for the abolished seat of Tea Tree Gully, Molly Byrne instead contested the new seat of Todd and won.

== Post-election pendulum ==
Labor seats (27)
Marginal
Morphett	Terry Groom	ALP	0.3%
Fairly safe
Mawson	Leslie Drury	ALP	6.5%
Todd	Molly Byrne	ALP	6.5%
Brighton	Hugh Hudson	ALP	8.1%
Henley Beach	Glen Broomhill	ALP	9.3%
Newland	John Klunder	ALP	9.8%
Safe
Unley	Gil Langley	ALP	10.1%
Norwood	Don Dunstan	ALP	10.2%
Hartley	Des Corcoran	ALP	10.4%
Mitchell	Ron Payne	ALP	11.4%
Ascot Park	Geoff Virgo	ALP	12.5%
Gilles	Jack Slater	ALP	12.8%
Albert Park	Charles Harrison	ALP	14.1%
Playford	Terry McRae	ALP	15.1%
Adelaide	Jack Wright	ALP	16.2%
Baudin	Don Hopgood	ALP	16.7%
Florey	Charles Wells	ALP	17.0%
Peake	Don Simmons	ALP	17.4%
Price	George Whitten	ALP	19.4%
Salisbury	Reg Groth	ALP	19.5%
Napier	Terry Hemmings	ALP	21.0%
Ross Smith	John Bannon	ALP	22.2%
Semaphore	Jack Olson	ALP	22.2%
Elizabeth	Peter Duncan	ALP	22.4%
Whyalla	Max Brown	ALP	23.2%
Stuart	Gavin Keneally	ALP	23.9%
Spence	Roy Abbott	ALP	27.3%

Liberal seats (17)
Marginal
Coles	Jennifer Adamson	LIB	1.4%
Mount Gambier	Harold Allison	LIB	1.4%
Torrens	Michael Wilson	LIB	2.5%
Hanson	Heini Becker	LIB	5.4%
Eyre	Graham Gunn	LIB	5.9%
Fairly safe
Rocky River	Howard Venning	LIB	8.2%
Glenelg	John Mathwin	LIB	9.5%
Chaffey	Peter Arnold	LIB	9.6%
Murray	David Wotton	LIB	10.0%
Safe
Fisher	Stan Evans	LIB	10.4%
Light	Bruce Eastick	LIB	10.7%
Bragg	David Tonkin	LIB	15.3%
Victoria	Allan Rodda	LIB	15.3%
Kavel	Roger Goldsworthy	LIB	18.7%
Alexandra	Ted Chapman	LIB	19.8%
Mallee	Bill Nankivell	LIB	23.8%
Davenport	Dean Brown	LIB	24.2%
Crossbench seats (3)
Mitcham	Robin Millhouse	DEM	6.5% v LIB
Goyder	Keith Russack	IND	7.9% v LIB
Flinders	Peter Blacker	NCP	24.2% v LIB

== See also ==
- Results of the South Australian state election, 1977 (House of Assembly)
- Candidates of the 1977 South Australian state election
- Members of the South Australian House of Assembly, 1977-1979
- Members of the South Australian Legislative Council, 1975-1979
