= Australian Fabian Society =

Australian political society founded in 1947

Australian Fabians
- Other name: Australian Fabian Society
- Established: In its current form: 1947; 79 years ago
- National Chair: Mark Bonanno
- Budget: A$75,334.40 (2022)
- Members: ▲1,704 (2022)
- Location: Australia
- Website: www.fabians.org.au

The Australian Fabians (also known as the Australian Fabian Society) is an Australian independent left-leaning think tank that was established in 1947. The organisation's said aims are to “contribute to progressive political thinking” as well as “progressive political culture.”

The Australian Fabians has close ties with the Australian Labor Party (ALP) and the Australian labour movement. Many past ALP prime ministers, federal ministers and state premiers were active members of the Australian Fabians while in office. The role of patron of the Australian Fabians is currently vacant and has been held by media and social commentator and feminist Eva Cox and former Australian prime minister, the late Gough Whitlam.

The Australian Fabians have had a significant influence on public policy development in Australia since the Second World War, with many of its members having held influential political offices in Australian governments.

== History ==
An earlier experiment with Fabianism in Australia was initiated in Adelaide in 1891 by the Rev Charles Marson, who had joined the Fabians in London in 1885 and drew in trade unionists like David Charleston, Robert Guthrie and John McPherson as well as social reformers like James and Lucy Morice into the first overseas branch of the UK Fabian Society. The Australian members retained their membership for ten years until the Adelaide branch was wound up in 1902. Another South Australian branch had an inaugural dinner 1938, but the society in its current form wasn't founded until 1947.

During the 1960s, the Victorian branch was closely aligned with the Participants grouping within the Victorian Labor Party, "who became the centre of organised support for Whitlam and opposition to the hard-left dominated Victorian Central Executive". The Victorian Labor Party at the time was run by the historic left grouping, while Whitlam and other states were involved with the historic right grouping.

Penny Wong frequently speaks to and writes for the Australian Fabians.

In 2020 the Fabians began publishing the Australian Fabian Review a magazine featuring "...original essays, interviews, letters, book reviews and fiction from a wide range of important progressive voices, from politicians, union officials, and community leaders to academics, activists and Australian icons." The review is published bi-annually.

== Purpose ==
The Australian Fabians' Statement of Purpose states:

Australian Fabians promote the common good and foster the advance of social democracy in Australia through reasoned debate by:

a) Contributing to progressive political thinking by generating ideas that reflect a level of thinking that meets the challenges of the times.
b) Contributing to a progressive political culture by disseminating these ideas and getting them into the public domain.
c) Creating an active movement of people who identify with, are engaged in and who encourage progressive political debate and reform, and
d) Influencing the ideas and policies of political parties, especially the Australian Labor Party.

== Logo ==
Logo of the Australian Fabians in 2006

Australian Fabians historically used a turtle and associated itself with the colour green, however due to confusion and associations with green groups and the greens; In addition to wanting to appeal to younger members, the group underwent a redesign in 2013, where it adopted a more red colour scheme as well as its new "F" logo.

== Notable members ==
- John Curtin - 14th Prime Minister of Australia (1941-1945) (Note: Curtin was the Patron of the Fabian South Australian Branch in 1938, died before the society in its current form was founded.)
- Heinz Arndt - German-born Australian economist
- Gough Whitlam - 21st Prime Minister of Australia (1972–1975)
- Frank Crean - 5th Deputy Prime Minister of Australia, Minister under Whitlam government
- Paul Keating - 24th Prime Minister of Australia (1991–1996)
- Don Dunstan - 35th Premier of South Australia (1970–1979)
- Janet McCalman - Australian social historian, population researcher and author
