= James Heaslip =

Australian politician

James Alexander Heaslip

Member of the South Australian Parliament for Rocky River
- In office 1949 – 1968
- Preceded by: John Lyons
- Succeeded by: Howard Venning

Personal details
- Born: 11 October 1900 Carrieton, South Australia
- Died: 13 August 1988 (aged 87)
- Spouse: Nellie Burston McMurray (m. 1930)
- Children: one son, three daughters
- Education: Prince Alfred College
- Occupation: Farmer and grazier

James Alexander Heaslip (11 October 1900 – 13 August 1988) was an Australian politician who represented the South Australian House of Assembly seat of Rocky River from 1949 to 1968 for the Liberal and Country League.

Heaslip was born in Carrieton and educated at the Appila State School and Prince Alfred College. He was a farmer and grazier, as well as a director of Grosvenor Hotel Ltd and a number of other companies. He was vice-president of the South Australian Wheat and Woolgrowers' Association, a member of the University of Adelaide council from 1959 to 1961 and a member of the Primary Producers Assistance Committee from 1968 to 1971.

He married Nellie Burston McMurray in 1930. They had one son and three daughters.

Parliament of South Australia
Preceded by John Lyons	Member for Rocky River; 1949–1968	Succeeded by Howard Venning
