= John Lyons (Australian politician) =

Australian politician

John Alexander Lyons

Member of the South Australian Parliament for Stanley
- In office 16 March 1926 – 18 March 1938 Serving with Robert Nicholls
- Preceded by: Henry Barwell
- Succeeded by: Alexander Melrose

Member of Parliament for Rocky River
- In office 19 March 1938 – 19 December 1948
- Preceded by: New seat
- Succeeded by: James Heaslip

Personal details
- Born: 12 January 1885
- Died: 19 December 1948 (aged 63)
- Occupation: Wheat farmer and grazier

John Alexander Lyons (12 January 1885 – 19 December 1948) was an Australian politician.

Before entering politics he was a wheat farmer and grazier, and chairman of the District Council of Georgetown from 1924 to 1946. In 1926 he was elected to the South Australian House of Assembly as the Liberal member for Stanley, moving to Rocky River following a redistribution in 1938. He held the seat until his death in 1948.

Parliament of South Australia
Preceded by Henry Barwell	Member for Stanley; 1926–1938; With: Robert Nicholls	Succeeded by Alexander Melrose
New title	Member for Rocky River; 1938–1948	Succeeded by James Heaslip
