= Electoral district of Walsh =

Former South Australian state electoral district

Coordinates: 34°59′40″S 138°33′40″E

Walsh South Australia—House of Assembly
- State: South Australia
- Created: 1985
- Abolished: 1993
- Namesake: Frank Walsh
- Demographic: Metropolitan

Walsh was an electoral district of the House of Assembly in the Australian state of South Australia from 1985 to 1993. It succeeded the seat of Ascot Park. It was mainly succeeded by the seat of Elder.

== Member ==
Member	Party	Term
John Trainer	Labor	1985–1993
