= John Trainer =

Australian politician

John Patrick Trainer (born 24 March 1943) is a former Australian politician.

Trainer was educated at Rostrevor College 1956–1960 on a scholarship, then Adelaide University and Adelaide Teacher's College. He taught at Brighton High School and Underdale High school before being appointed in the Educational Technology Centre of the SA Education Department as a Senior Adviser. He unsuccessfully contested the 1974 federal election as the Australian Labor Party candidate in the safe Liberal seat of Boothby.

Trainer represented Labor in the seats of Ascot Park from 1979 to 1985 and Walsh from 1985 to 1993 in the South Australian House of Assembly. He served as Speaker of the South Australian House of Assembly from 1986 to 1990 for the John Bannon Labor government. He also served as government whip from 1982 to 1985 and from 1989 to 1993.

Trainer lost his seat in the Liberals' landslide win at the 1993 state election; he was the Labor candidate for Hanson after his seat of Walsh was abolished in a redistribution. He resigned from the Australian Labor Party in 1996 and unsuccessfully contested the 1997 election in Hanson as an independent.

Trainer was mayor of the City of West Torrens from 2000 to 2018. He was re-elected unopposed in the 2003, 2006, 2010 and 2014 council elections. He was awarded the OAM in 2015.

Parliament of South Australia
Preceded by Geoff Virgo	Member for Ascot Park; 1979–1985	District abolished
New district	Member for Walsh; 1985–1993	District abolished
Preceded by Terry McRae	Speaker of the South Australian House of Assembly; 1986–1990	Succeeded by Norm Peterson
