= Don Dunstan =

Australian politician (1926–1999)

The Honourable Don Dunstan AC QC
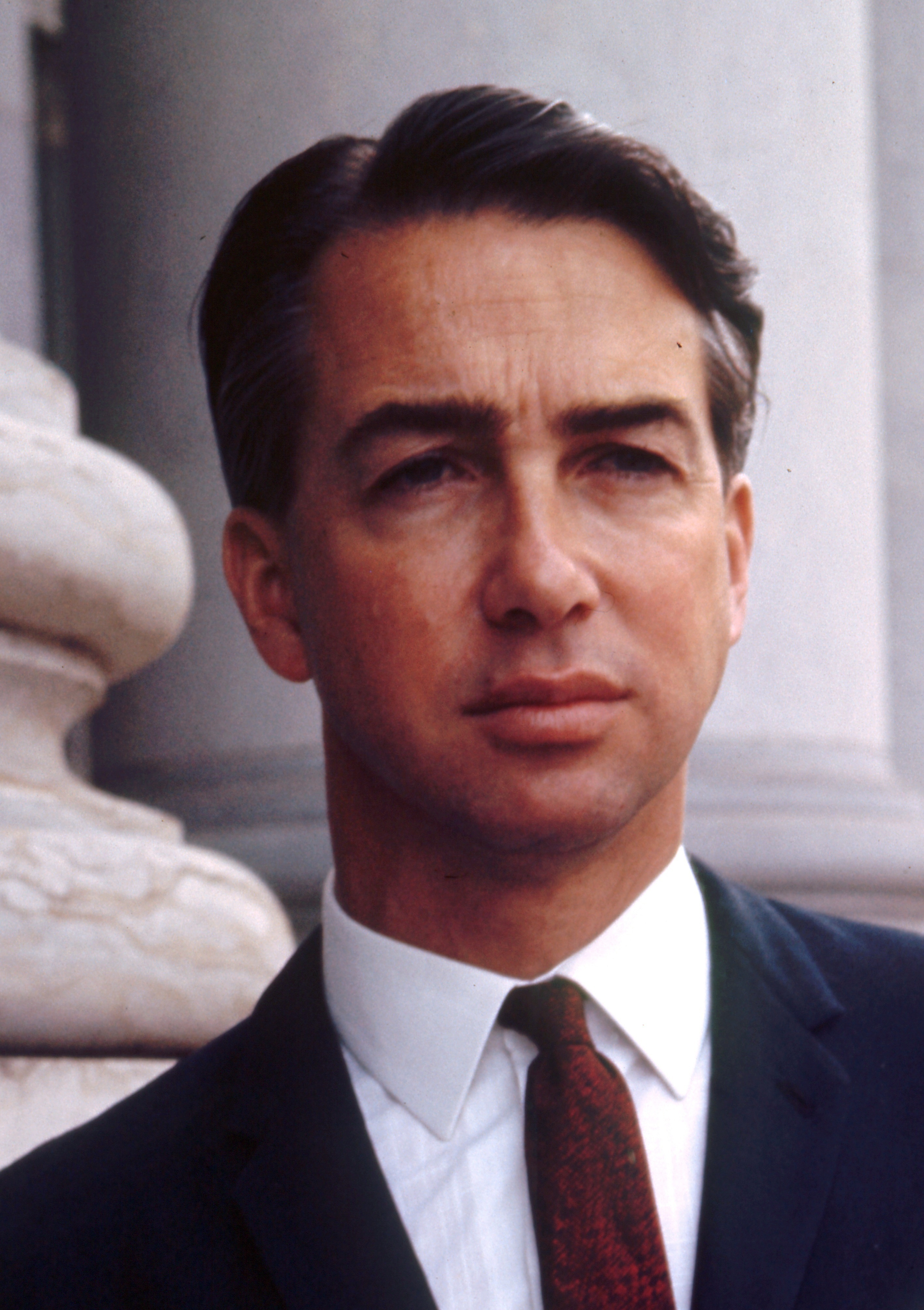
- Dunstan in 1968

35th Premier of South Australia
- In office 2 June 1970 – 15 February 1979
- Monarch: Elizabeth II
- Governor: Sir James Harrison; Sir Mark Oliphant; Sir Douglas Nicholls; Sir Keith Seaman
- Deputy: Des Corcoran
- Preceded by: Steele Hall
- Succeeded by: Des Corcoran
- In office 1 June 1967 – 17 April 1968
- Monarch: Elizabeth II
- Governor: Sir Edric Bastyan
- Deputy: Des Corcoran
- Preceded by: Frank Walsh
- Succeeded by: Steele Hall

Leader of the Opposition in South Australia
- In office 17 April 1968 – 2 June 1970
- Deputy: Des Corcoran
- Preceded by: Steele Hall
- Succeeded by: Steele Hall

Leader of the South Australian Labor Party
- In office 1 June 1967 – 15 February 1979
- Deputy: Des Corcoran
- Preceded by: Frank Walsh
- Succeeded by: Des Corcoran

Treasurer of South Australia
- In office 2 June 1970 – 15 February 1975
- Premier: Himself
- Preceded by: Steele Hall
- Succeeded by: Des Corcoran
- In office 1 June 1967 – 16 April 1968
- Premier: Himself
- Preceded by: Frank Walsh
- Succeeded by: Steele Hall

38th Attorney-General of South Australia
- In office 20 June 1975 – 9 October 1975
- Premier: Himself
- Preceded by: Len King
- Succeeded by: Peter Duncan
- In office 10 March 1965 – 16 April 1968
- Premier: Frank Walsh; Himself
- Preceded by: Colin Rowe
- Succeeded by: Robin Millhouse

Member of the South Australian Parliament for Norwood
- In office 7 March 1953 – 10 March 1979
- Preceded by: Roy Moir
- Succeeded by: Greg Crafter

Personal details
- Born: 21 September 1926 Suva, Colony of Fiji
- Died: 6 February 1999 (aged 72) Norwood, South Australia
- Party: Labor
- Spouses: Gretel Elsasser (m. 1949; div. 1974) Adele Koh (m. 1976; died 1978)
- Domestic partner(s): Steven Cheng (1986–1999)
- Children: 3

Donald Allan Dunstan AC QC (21 September 1926 – 6 February 1999) was an Australian politician who served as the 35th premier of South Australia from 1967 to 1968, and again from 1970 to 1979. He was a member of the House of Assembly (MHA) for the division of Norwood from 1953 to 1979, and leader of the South Australian Branch of the Australian Labor Party from 1967 to 1979. Before becoming premier, Dunstan served as the 38th attorney-general of South Australia and the treasurer of South Australia. He is the fourth longest serving premier in South Australian history.

In the late 1950s, Dunstan became well known for his campaign against the death penalty being imposed on Max Stuart, who was convicted of rape and murder of a small girl, opposing then-Premier Thomas Playford over the matter. During Labor's time in opposition, Dunstan was prominent in securing some reforms in Aboriginal rights and in Labor abandoning the White Australia policy. Dunstan became Attorney-General after the 1965 election, and replaced the older Frank Walsh as premier in 1967. Despite maintaining a much larger vote over the Liberal and Country League (LCL), Labor lost two seats at the 1968 election, with the LCL forming government with support of an independent. Dunstan responded by increasing his attacks on the Playmander, convincing the LCL into watering down the malapportionment. With little change in Labor's vote but with the Playmander removed, Labor won 27 of 47 seats at the 1970 election, and again in 1973, 1975, and 1977.

Dunstan's socially progressive administration saw Aboriginal land rights recognised, homosexuality decriminalised, the first female judge (Dame Roma Mitchell) appointed, the first non-British governor, Sir Mark Oliphant, and later the first Indigenous governor, Sir Douglas Nicholls. He enacted consumer protection laws, reformed and expanded the public education and health systems, abolished the death penalty, relaxed censorship and drinking laws, created a ministry for the environment, enacted anti-discrimination law, and implemented electoral reforms such as the overhaul of the Legislative Council, the upper house of Parliament, lowered the voting age to 18, enacted universal suffrage, and completely abolished malapportionment. He also established Rundle Mall, enacted measures to protect buildings of historical heritage, and encouraged arts, with support for the Adelaide Festival Centre, the State Theatre Company, and the establishment of the South Australian Film Corporation.

At the same time, there were also problems; the economy began to stagnate, and the large increases to burgeoning public service generated claims of waste. One of Dunstan's pet projects, a plan to build a new city at Monarto to alleviate urban pressures in Adelaide, was abandoned when economic and population growth stalled, with much money and planning already invested. After four consecutive election wins, Dunstan's administration began to falter in 1978 following his dismissal of Police Commissioner Harold Salisbury, as controversy broke out over whether he had improperly interfered with a judicial investigation. In addition, policy problems and unemployment began to mount, as well as unsubstantiated rumours of corruption and personal impropriety. The strain on Dunstan was increased by the death of his wife. His resignation from the premiership and politics in 1979 was abrupt after collapsing due to ill health, but he lived for another 20 years, remaining a vocal and outspoken campaigner for progressive social policy.

== Early life and education ==
Donald Allan Dunstan was born on 21 September 1926 in Suva, Colony of Fiji, the son of Francis Vivian Dunstan and Ida May Dunstan (née Hill), Australians of Cornish descent. His parents had moved to Fiji in 1916 after his father took up a position as manager of the Adelaide Steamship Company. He spent the first seven years of his life in Fiji, starting his schooling there. Dunstan was beset by illness, and his parents sent him to South Australia hoping the drier climate would assist his recovery. He lived in Murray Bridge for three years with his mother's parents before returning to Suva for a short period during his secondary education. During his time in Fiji, Dunstan mixed easily with the Indian settlers and indigenous people, something that was frowned upon by many of the white people on the islands.

Dunstan won a scholarship in classical studies and attended St Peter's College, a traditional private school for the sons of the Adelaide establishment. He developed public speaking and acting skills, winning the college's public speaking prize for two consecutive years. In 1943, he portrayed the title role in a production of John Drinkwater's play Abraham Lincoln, and according to the school magazine, he "was the chief contributor to the success of the occasion". His academic strengths were in classical history and languages, and he disliked mathematics. He gained a reputation as a maverick. During this time, Dunstan did not board and lived in the seaside suburb of Glenelg with relatives. Dunstan completed his secondary schooling in 1943, ranking in the top 30 overall in the statewide matriculation examinations.

In his youth, influenced by his uncle, former Liberal Lord Mayor of Adelaide Sir Jonathan Cain, Dunstan was a supporter of the conservative Liberal and Country League (LCL) and handed out how-to-vote cards for the party at state elections. Dunstan later said of his involvement with the Liberals: "I do not call it snobbery to deride the Establishment in South Australia, I admit that I was brought up into it, and I admit that it gave me a pain." When asked of his roots, he said, "I'm a refugee from it and thank God for somewhere honest to flee to!"

His political awakening happened during his university years. Studying law and arts at the University of Adelaide, he became very active, joining the University Socialist Club, the Fabian Society, the Student Representative Council, as well as the Theatre Group. A two-week stint in the Communist Party was followed by membership in the Australian Labor Party.

Dunstan was markedly different from the general membership of the Labor Party of the time; upon applying for membership at Trades Hall, a Labor veteran supposedly muttered "how could that long-haired prick be a Labor man?" His peculiarities, such as his upper-class accent, were a target of derision by the working-class Labor old guard throughout his early political involvement. Dunstan funded his education by working in theatre and radio during his university years. He eventually graduated with a double degree, with arts majors in Latin, comparative philology, history and politics, and he came first in political science.

After Dunstan graduated, he moved with his wife to Fiji where he was admitted to the bar and began his career as a lawyer. They returned to Adelaide in 1951 and settled in George Street, Norwood, taking in boarders as a source of extra income.

== Political beginnings ==
Dunstan was nominated as the Labor candidate for the electoral district of Norwood at the 1953 election. His campaign was noted for his colourful methods to sway voters: posters of his face were placed on every pole in the district, and Labor supporters walked the streets advocating Dunstan. He targeted in particular the large Italian migrant population of the district, distributing translated copies of a statement the sitting LCL member Roy Moir had made about immigrants. Moir had commented that "these immigrants are of no use to us – a few of them are tradesmen but most of them have no skills at all. And when they intermarry we'll have all the colours of the rainbow." Dunstan won the seat and was elected to the South Australian House of Assembly. His son Andrew was born nine months after the win.

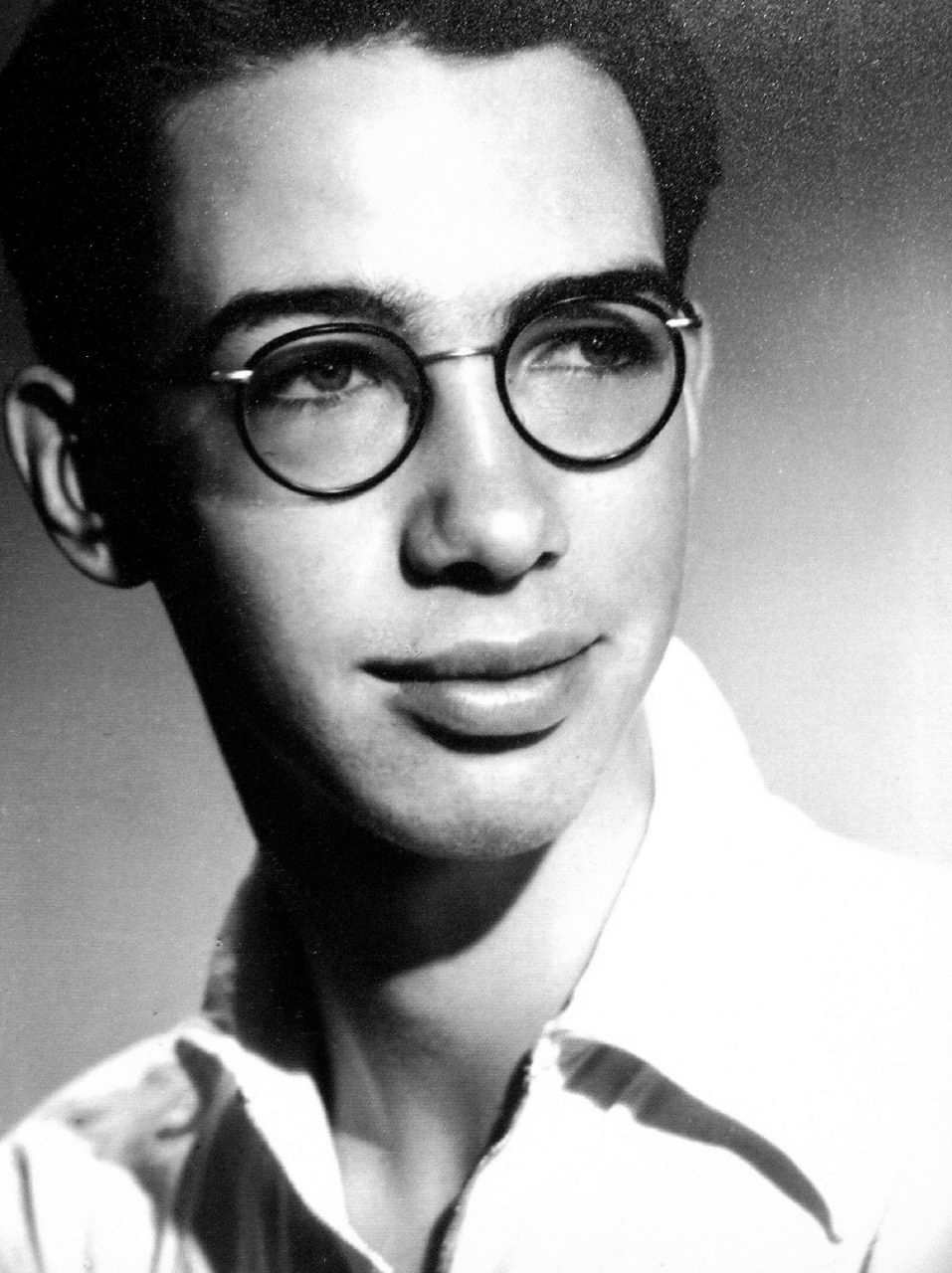
Dunstan at a young age

Dunstan was to become the most vocal opponent of the LCL Government of Sir Thomas Playford, strongly criticising its practice of electoral malapportionment, known as the Playmander, a pun on the term gerrymander. This system gave a disproportionate electoral weight to the LCL's rural base, with votes worth as much as ten times others − at the 1968 election the rural seat of Frome had 4,500 formal votes, while the metropolitan seat of Enfield had 42,000 formal votes. He added colour and flair to debate in South Australian politics, changing the existing "gentlemanly" method of conducting parliamentary proceedings. He did not fear direct confrontation with the incumbent government and attacked it with vigour. Up to this point most of his Labor colleagues had become dispirited by the Playmander and were resigned to the ongoing dominance of Playford and LCL, so they sought to influence policy through collaborative legislating.

In 1954, the LCL introduced the Government Electoral Bill, which was designed to further accentuate the undue weight favouring rural voters. During the debate, Dunstan decried this "immoral Bill ... I cannot separate it from the motives of those who put it forward. Since it is immoral, so are they." Such language, unusually aggressive by the prevailing standards, resulted in Dunstan's removal from the parliamentary chambers after he refused a request from the Speaker to retract his remark. The first parliamentarian to be expelled in years, Dunstan found himself on the front pages of newspapers for the first time. Nevertheless, he was not able to build up much of a profile in his first few years as The Advertiser, the dominant newspaper in the city, had a policy of ignoring the young politician's activities—its editor Lloyd Dumas was the father of one of Dunstan's first girlfriends.

== Max Stuart trial ==
In December 1958 there occurred an event that initially had nothing to do with Playford, but eventually intensified into a debacle regarded as a turning point in his premiership and marked the end of his rule. Dunstan was prominent in pressuring Playford during this time.

A young girl was found raped and murdered, and Max Stuart, an Aboriginal man, was convicted and sentenced to be executed. Stuart's lawyer claimed that the confession was forced, and appeals to the Supreme and High Courts were dismissed. Amid objections against the fairness of the trial among an increasing number of legal academics and judges, The News brought much attention to Stuart's plight with an aggressive, tabloid-style campaign.

When Playford and the Executive Council decided not to reprieve Stuart, an appeal to the Privy Council was made to stall the execution. Spearheaded by Dunstan, Labor then tried to introduce legislation to stall the hanging. Amid hue and cry, Playford started a Royal Commission to review the case. However, two of the commissioners had already been involved in the trial and one of the appeals. This provoked worldwide controversy with claims of bias from Dunstan and Labor, who also attacked Playford for what they regarded as a too-restrictive scope of inquiry.

The Royal Commission began its work and the proceedings were followed closely and eagerly debated by the public. As Playford did not commute Stuart's sentence, Dunstan introduced a bill to abolish capital punishment. The vote was split along party lines and was thus defeated, but Dunstan used the opportunity to attack the Playmander with much effect in the media, portraying the failed legislation as an unjust triumph of a malapportioned minority who had a vengeance mentality over an electorally repressed majority who wanted a humane outcome.

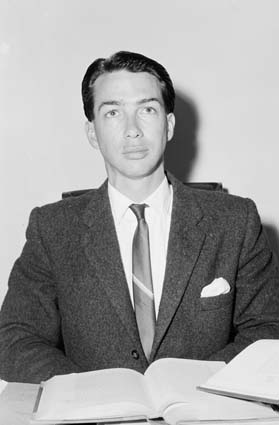
Dunstan in 1963

Amid the continuing uproar, Playford decided to grant clemency. The Royal Commission concluded that the guilty verdict was sound. Although a majority of those who spoke out against the handling of the matter (including Dunstan) thought Stuart was probably guilty, the events provoked heated and bitter debate in South Australian society and destabilised Playford's administration, while bringing much publicity to Dunstan.

From 1959 onwards, the LCL government clung to power with the support of two independents, as Labor gained momentum. Always at the forefront, Dunstan lambasted the government for perceived underspending on social welfare, education, health and the arts. Dunstan heavily promoted himself as a reformer.

In 1960, Dunstan became president of the State Labor Party. The year also saw the death of Opposition Leader Mick O'Halloran and his replacement by Frank Walsh. Dunstan attempted to win the position of Opposition Leader and, failing that, Deputy Leader. However, the Labor caucus was sceptical of his age and inexperience, and he failed to gain either position, albeit narrowly.

== Ascent to power ==
Federally, Dunstan, together with fellow Australian Fabian Society member Gough Whitlam, set about removing the White Australia policy from the Labor platform. The older trade-unionist-based members of the Labor Party vehemently opposed changing the status quo. However, the "New Guard" of the party, of which Dunstan was a part, were determined to bring about its end. Attempts in 1959 and 1961 failed, with Labor leader Arthur Calwell stating, "It would ruin the Party if we altered the immigration policy ... it was only cranks, long hairs, academics and do-gooders who wanted the change." However, Dunstan persisted in his efforts, and in 1965 it was removed from the Labor platform at their national conference; Dunstan personally took credit for the change. Whitlam later brought about the comprehensive end of the White Australia policy in 1973 as Prime Minister of Australia.

Dunstan pursued similar reforms with respect to Indigenous Australians. In 1962, the Aboriginal Affairs Bill was introduced to liberalise constraints that had been placed on Indigenous Australians in the past and had effectively resulted in segregation. The initial proposal still retained some restrictions, placing more controls over full-blooded Aboriginal people. Dunstan was prominent in Labor's opposition to the double standards, and called for abolition of race-based restrictions, saying that social objectives could be achieved without explicit colour-based schemes. He was successful in forcing amendments to liberalise controls on property and the confinement of Indigenous Australians to Aboriginal reserves. However, his attempt to remove the different standards required of part and full-blooded Aboriginal people failed, as did his proposal to ensure that at least half of the members of the Aboriginal Affairs Board be Indigenous Australians. Despite the passage of the bill, restrictions remained in place and Dunstan questioned the policy of assimilation of Aboriginal people, which he saw as the diluting of their distinctive cultures.

Labor won the seats of Glenelg and Barossa at the 1965 election, after winning the seats of Chaffey and Unley at the 1962 election. Labor thus finally overcame the Playmander and formed government for the first time in 32 years, with Frank Walsh as Premier of South Australia. Despite winning 55 percent of the primary vote, the Playmander was still strong enough that Labor won only 21 of 39 seats, a two-seat majority. Dunstan became Attorney-General and Minister of Community Welfare and Aboriginal Affairs. He was far and away the youngest member of the cabinet; he was the only minister under 50, and one of only three under 60. Dunstan had a major impact on Government policy as Attorney-General. Having only narrowly lost out on the leadership in 1960, Dunstan became the obvious successor to the 67-year-old Walsh, who was due to retire in 1967 under Labor rules of the time.

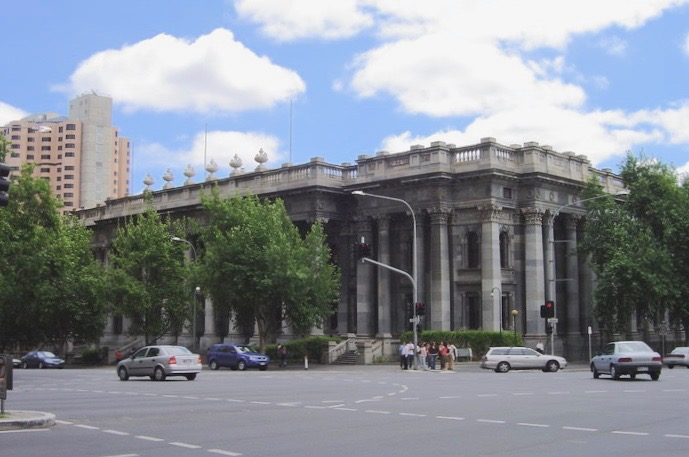
The South Australian Parliament House, situated on the cultural boulevard of North Terrace

The Walsh Government implemented significant reform in its term of office. Liquor, gambling and entertainment laws were overhauled and liberalised, social welfare was gradually expanded and Aboriginal reserves were created. Strong restrictions on Aboriginal access to liquor were lifted. Women's working rights were granted under the mantra of "equal pay for work of equal value", and racial discrimination legislation was enacted. Town planning was codified in law, and the State Planning Authority was created to oversee development. Workers were given more rights and the bureaucracy of the education department was liberalised. Much of the reform was not necessarily radical and was primarily to "fill the gaps" that the previous LCL government had left. Despite a consistently higher statewide vote, Labor were consistently outnumbered 16–4 in the Legislative Council, so some desired legislation did not make it through. In 1965, the legislature convened for 65 days, the most for 34 years, but many bills were still yet to be debated.

Many bills were watered down, but due to lack of public interest, outcry was minimal. In particular, the council blocked electoral reform legislation, paving the way for a probable LCL win at the next election. Such was Dunstan's pre-eminence during his term as Attorney-General that the cabinet was often called the "Dunstan Ministry".

An economic depression had begun in South Australia after the Labor government gained office in 1965; unemployment went from the lowest in the country to the second highest, while immigration levels dropped. Labor was not responsible for the depression, although it initially did little to alleviate it. The Liberals seized on this opportunity, blaming it on "twelve months of Socialist administration in South Australia" and branding it the "Dunstan Depression".

In the 1966 Australian federal election, Labor suffered a swing against it of 11.8% in South Australia, double the national average. If this was replicated at a state election, it was projected that Labor would hold only ten of the 39 seats. The Liberals dropped Playford as the state leader, and the younger and more progressive Steele Hall took his place. In a dire situation with the next state election looming, Labor changed leaders with Walsh, a "neanderthal figure in the television age", standing down in May 1967. Much of the Labor Right faction, as well as Walsh, was opposed to Dunstan taking the leadership, but no other MPs had the same charisma or eloquence. Eventually, Dunstan won the leadership over Des Corcoran, winning fourteen votes to eleven on the strength of rural and marginal Laborites, having trailed by one vote on the first count before less popular candidates were eliminated.

Dunstan's first Premiership was eventful, with a steady stream of reform and attempts to end the depression. The latter half of 1967 saw the beginnings of a slight recovery, with unemployment dipping and industrial capacity steadying. The 1967–68 budget ran into deficit, allocating funds to energise the economic engine whilst Dunstan lambasted the Federal Government for neglecting the South Australian economy, demanding it take a degree of responsibility for its ills.

== Elections (1968–1970) ==
In preparation for the 1968 election, Labor campaigned heavily around its leader, and this resonated with voters; in surveys conducted in parts of the metropolitan area, 84% of respondents declared their approval of Dunstan. In a presidential-style election campaign, Hall and Dunstan journeyed across the state advocating their platforms, and the major issues were the leaders, the Playmander and the economy. Television saw its first major use in the election, and Dunstan, an astute public speaker, successfully mastered it. With his upbeat style, Dunstan also made an impact in the print media, which had long been a bastion of the LCL. Despite winning a 52% majority of the primary vote, and 54% of the two-party preferred count, Labor lost two seats, resulting in a hung parliament: the LCL and Labor each had 19 seats. Had 21 votes in the rural seat of Murray gone the other way, Labor would have retained power. The balance of power rested with the chamber's lone independent, Tom Stott, who was offered the speakership by the LCL in return for his support on the Assembly floor. Stott, a conservative, agreed to support the LCL.

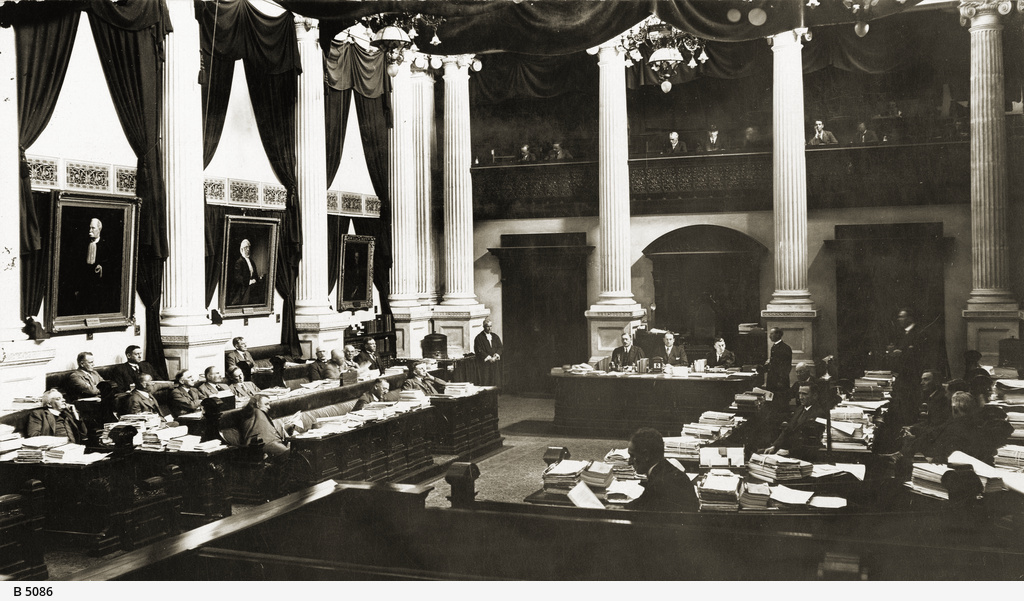
The South Australian House of Assembly. The Assembly's composition was radically altered after changes were made to electoral legislation, abolishing the electoral malapportionment of the "Playmander".

There was a degree of speculation in the press that Dunstan would call for a new election because of the adverse outcome. However, Dunstan realised the futility of such a move and instead sought to humiliate the LCL into bringing an end to malapportionment. Although Stott's decision to support the LCL ended any realistic chance of Dunstan remaining premier, Dunstan did not immediately resign his commission, intending to force Hall and the LCL to demonstrate that they had support on the floor of the Assembly when it reconvened. He used the six weeks before the start of the new legislature to draw attention to malapportionment. Protests were held on 15 March in Light Square. There, Dunstan spoke to a crowd of more than ten thousand: "We need to show that the people of SA feel that at last the watershed has been reached in this, and that they will not continue to put up with a system which is as undemocratic as the present one in SA."

On 16 April, the first day of the new House's sitting, Dunstan lost a confidence vote. With it now clear that the LCL had control of the House, Dunstan tendered his resignation to Governor Edric Bastyan. Hall was then sworn in as premier. However, the six weeks of protesting had brought nationwide criticism of the unfairness of the electoral system and put more pressure on the LCL to relent to reforms; it has been seen as one of the most important political events of its time.

With the end of Playford's tenure, the LCL had brought younger, more progressive members into its ranks. The Hall Government continued many of the social reforms the Walsh/Dunstan governments had initiated; most of these at the instigation of Hall or his Attorney-General, Robin Millhouse. Abortion was partially legalised, and planning for the Festival Centre began. The conservative and rural factions of the League, notably in the Legislative Council dominated by the landed gentry, were bitterly opposed to some reforms, and more than once Hall was forced to rely on Labor support to see bills passed. The LCL began to break apart; what had once been a united party was now factionalised into four distinct groups across the political spectrum. The economy of South Australia began to pick up under Hall, returning to full employment. During the term in opposition, Des Corcoran became Dunstan's deputy, and the pair worked together well despite any rift that may have been caused by the struggle to succeed Walsh.

Hall was embarrassed that the LCL was in a position to win government despite having clearly lost the first-preference vote, and was committed to a fairer electoral system. Soon after taking office, he enacted a complete overhaul of the electoral system. While they fell short of "one vote one value" as Labor and Dunstan had demanded, they were still significant. Under the Playmander the lower house had 39 seats, 13 in Adelaide and 26 in the country. Hall's reforms expanded the lower house to 47 seats–28 in Adelaide and 19 in the country. While there was still a slight rural weighting (since Adelaide accounted for two-thirds of the state's population), with Adelaide now electing a majority of the legislature, historical results made a Labor win at the next election likely.

Stott withdrew support in 1970 over the Chowilla Dam, a dispute over the location of a dam on the Murray River, and South Australia went to the polls. The dam controversy was not much of an election issue, and attempts by the Democratic Labor Party to portray Dunstan as a communist over his opposition to ongoing Australian support for South Vietnam had little effect. The LCL campaigned heavily on Hall, while Dunstan promised sweeping social reform, artistic transformation and more community services. He said "We'll set a new standard of social advancement that the whole of Australia will envy. We believe South Australia can set the pace. It can happen here. We can do it." Dunstan won the 1970 South Australian state election easily, taking 27 seats compared with the LCL's 20. Although the share of the votes had been similar to 1968, the dilution of the Playmander had changed the share of the seats. As Labor had attained a majority of the popular vote for a long period, and because malapportionment had been largely ended, the political scientists Neal Blewett and Dean Jaensch said: "A Dunstan decade seems assured."

== Dunstan decade ==
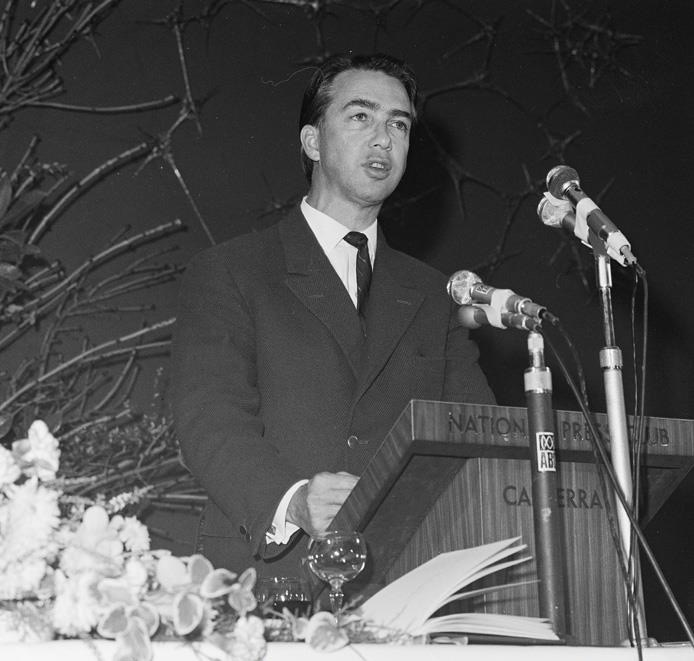
Dunstan addressing the National Press Club in 1970

Dunstan wasted no time in organising his new ministry. He served as his own Treasurer, and took several other portfolios for himself. Deputy Premier Des Corcoran took on most infrastructure portfolios: Marine and Harbours, and Public Works. Corcoran became the face of the Dunstan ministry in its relationship with the Labor caucus, with his ability to use his strong manner to settle disputes. Bert Shard became Health Minister, overseeing the construction and planning of new, major public hospitals: the Flinders Medical Centre and Modbury Hospital. Hugh Hudson took on the Education portfolio, an important role in a government that was determined to bring about profound change to the South Australian education system. Geoff Virgo, the new Transport Minister, was to deal with the Metropolitan Adelaide Transport Study (MATS) plans. Len King was made Attorney-General and Aboriginal Affairs Minister despite being a new member of parliament. Dunstan formed a strong circle of loyal ministers around him, in a style radically different from his predecessors.

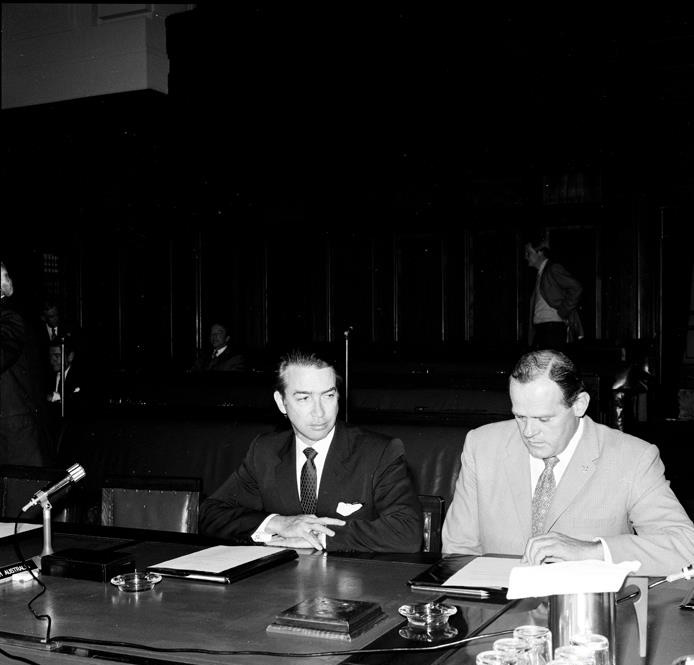
Dunstan with Des Corcoran in April 1971

Soon after the election, Dunstan travelled to Canberra for the annual Premiers' Conference as the sole Labor premier. His Government, on a mandate to dramatically increase funding in key areas, sought to appropriate further finances from the Federal Government. This brought Dunstan into conflict with Prime Minister John Gorton, and federal funding to SA was not increased. An appeal was made to the Federal Grants Commission, and Dunstan was awarded more than he had hoped for. In addition to the money received from the Grants Commission, funds were diverted from water-storage schemes in the Adelaide Hills over the advice of engineers, and cash reserves were withdrawn from the two government-owned banks. The monies were subsequently used to finance health, education and arts schemes.

On the death in office of Governor Sir James Harrison in 1971, Dunstan finally had the opportunity to put forward a nominee for governor of his own choosing to HM Queen Elizabeth II (and by extension the British Foreign Office which still technically oversaw the appointment process of Australian state governors until the Australia Act 1986): Sir Mark Oliphant, a physicist who had worked on the Manhattan Project. Dunstan had never been happy that governors were usually British ex-servicemen and it was a personal goal of his to see an active and notable South Australian take on the role; Sir Mark Oliphant was uneventfully sworn in. Although the post is mostly ceremonial (with the exception of constitutional responsibilities), Oliphant brought energy to the role and he used his stature to decry damage to the environment caused by deforestation, excessive open-cut mining and pollution. Oliphant's tenure was successful and held in high regard, although he did come into conflict with the premier at times as both men were outspoken and strong-willed.

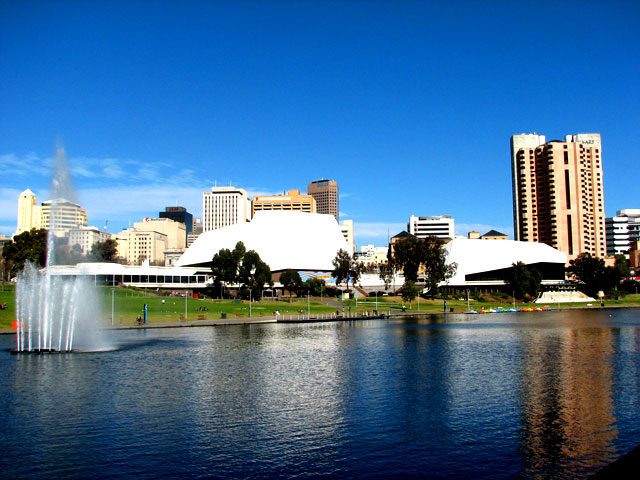
The Adelaide Festival Centre. A 620-seat theatre in the complex is named the "Dunstan Playhouse" in his honour.

In 1972, the first major developments in regard to the state's population growth occurred. Adelaide's population was set to increase to 1.3 million and the MATS plan and water-storage schemes were in planning to accommodate this. These were summarily rejected by the Dunstan Government, which planned to build a new city 83 kilometres from Adelaide, near Murray Bridge. The city, to be known as Monarto, was to be built on farmland to the west of the existing town. Dunstan was very much against allowing Adelaide's suburbs to further sprawl, and thus Monarto was a major focus of his government. He argued that the new South Eastern Freeway would allow a drive of only 45 minutes from Adelaide, that the city was not far from current industry, and that water could be readily supplied from the River Murray. The government hoped Adelaide would not sprawl into the Mount Lofty Ranges to the east and that the bureaucracy would be dispersed from the capital. In contrast, public servants feared being forced into the rural settlement. Critics (of whom there were many) derided the project as "Dunstan's Versailles in the bush". Environmental activists aired fears of the effects of Monarto on the River Murray, which was already suffering from pollution and salinity problems. Later on, it was noticed that there was hard bedrock underneath the ground, raising drainage problems.

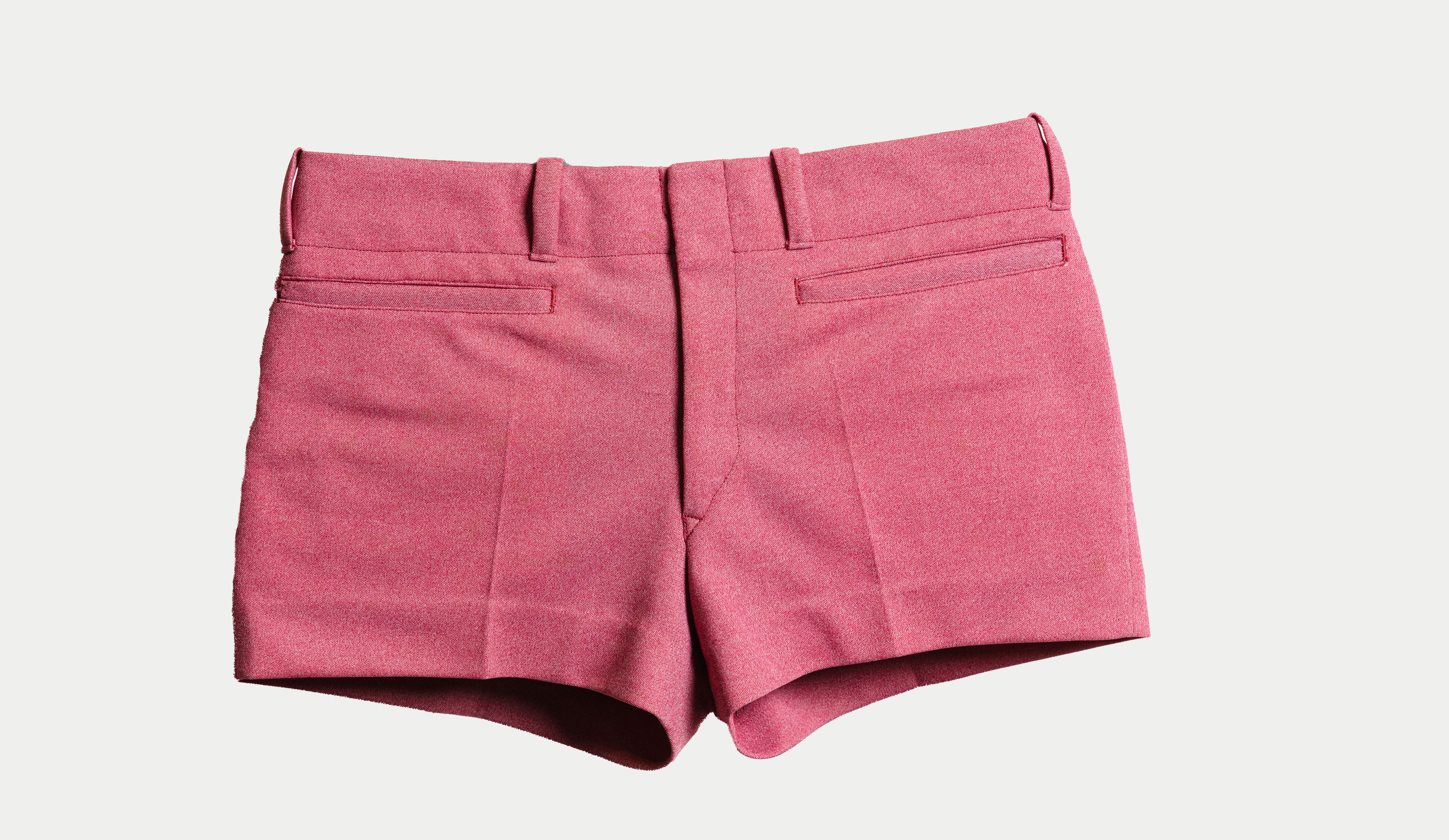
Pink shorts (sometimes referred to as hot pants) worn by South Australian Premier Don Dunstan.

From 1970 to 1973, much legislation passed through the South Australian Parliament. Workers saw increases in welfare, drinking laws were further liberalised, an Ombudsman was created, censorship was liberalised, seat belts were made mandatory, the education system was overhauled, and the public service was gradually increased (doubling in size during the Dunstan era). Adelaide's water supply was fluoridated in 1971 and the age of majority was lowered from 21 to 18. A Commissioner of Consumer Affairs was created, a demerit point system was introduced to penalise poor driving practices in an attempt to cut the road toll, and compensation for workers was improved. Police autonomy and powers were restricted following a rally in opposition to the Vietnam War, which was broken up by police, although Dunstan had wanted the demonstrators to be able to close off the street. A royal commission was called into the police commissioner's disregard for Dunstan's orders, and resulted in legislation giving the government more control over the police; the commissioner then retired. The dress code for the Parliament was relaxed during this period, the suit and tie was no longer seen as obligatory, and Dunstan himself caused media frenzy when he was seen on the steps of Parliament House in 1972 wearing pink shorts that ended well above his knees. After his departure from public life he admitted that his sartorial statement may have gone beyond the limits. Nevertheless, his fashion sense resulted in his being voted "the sexiest political leader in Australia" by Woman's Day in 1975, and the image of Dunstan in the shorts remains widely recognised.

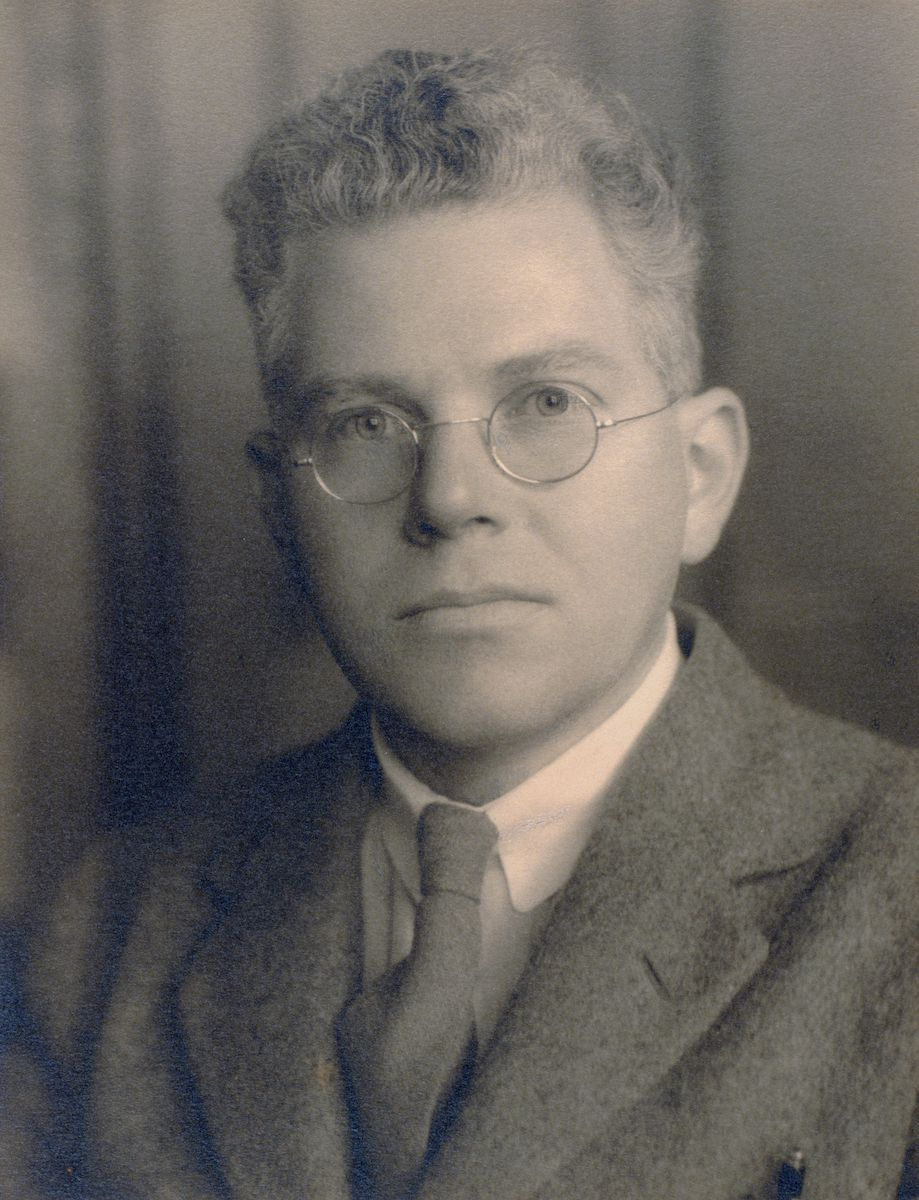
Mark Oliphant, the first Governor of South Australia to be appointed on Dunstan's recommendation

Having played a part in Labor's abandonment of the White Australia Policy at national level, Dunstan was also prominent in promoting multiculturalism. He was well known for his attendance at and patronage of Cornish, Italian and Greek Australian cultural festivals and his appreciation of Asian art, and sought to build on cultural respect to create trade links with Asia. Dunstan's involvement in such cultural exchanges was also credited with generating strong support for Labor from ethnic and non-Anglo-Saxon immigrant communities, although it was viewed with suspicion by some in the Anglo-Saxon establishment. Dunstan himself later recalled: "When I proposed the establishment of a Cornish Festival, in Australia's 'Little Cornwall', people of Cornish descent came flocking."

Having been vocal in criticising Playford for sacrificing heritage to the march of development, Dunstan was prominent in protecting historic buildings from being bulldozed for high-rise office blocks. In 1972, the government intervened to purchase and thereby save Edmund Wright House on King William Street from being replaced with a skyscraper. In 1975, the Customs House at Semaphore was purchased to save it from demolition. His support of heritage preservation overlapped with his promotion of gourmet dining when his personal efforts helped to save the historic Ayers House on North Terrace, having it converted into a restaurant to avoid demolition. In contrast, there were also some controversial developments. Part of the rocky Hallett Cove on Gulf St Vincent in Adelaide's southern suburbs was developed for housing, as were vineyards in Morphettville, Tea Tree Gully, Modbury, and Reynella. This attracted criticism, as Dunstan was prominent in promoting South Australian viticulture and enotourism.

In pursuit of economic links with the nations of South-East Asia, Dunstan came into contact with the leaders of the Malaysian state of Penang in 1973. Striking a note with Chong Eu Lim, the Chief Minister, Dunstan set about organising cultural and economic engagement between the two states. "Penang Week" was held in Adelaide in July, and in return, "South Australia Week" was held in Penang's capital, George Town. In the same year, the Adelaide Festival Centre was opened – Australia's first multifunction performing arts complex.

Over a six-year period, government funding for the arts was increased by a factor of seven and in 1978, the South Australian Film Corporation commenced work. During Dunstan's time in charge, acclaimed films such as Breaker Morant, Picnic at Hanging Rock and Storm Boy were made in the state. Dunstan's support of the arts and fine dining was credited by commentators with attracting artists, craftspeople and writers into the state, helping to change its atmosphere.

The Legislative Council, the upper house of Parliament, was, due to its limited electoral roll, overwhelmingly non-Labor. Unlike the Lower House, its members were elected only by voters who met certain property and wealth requirements. Combined with the remains of the "Playmander" malapportionment, it was difficult for the Labor Party to achieve the representation it wished. The Legislative Council either watered down or outright rejected a considerable amount of Labor legislation; bills to legalise homosexuality, abolish corporal and capital punishment and allow gambling and casinos were rejected. A referendum had indicated support for Friday night shopping, but Labor legislation was blocked in the upper house by the LCL.

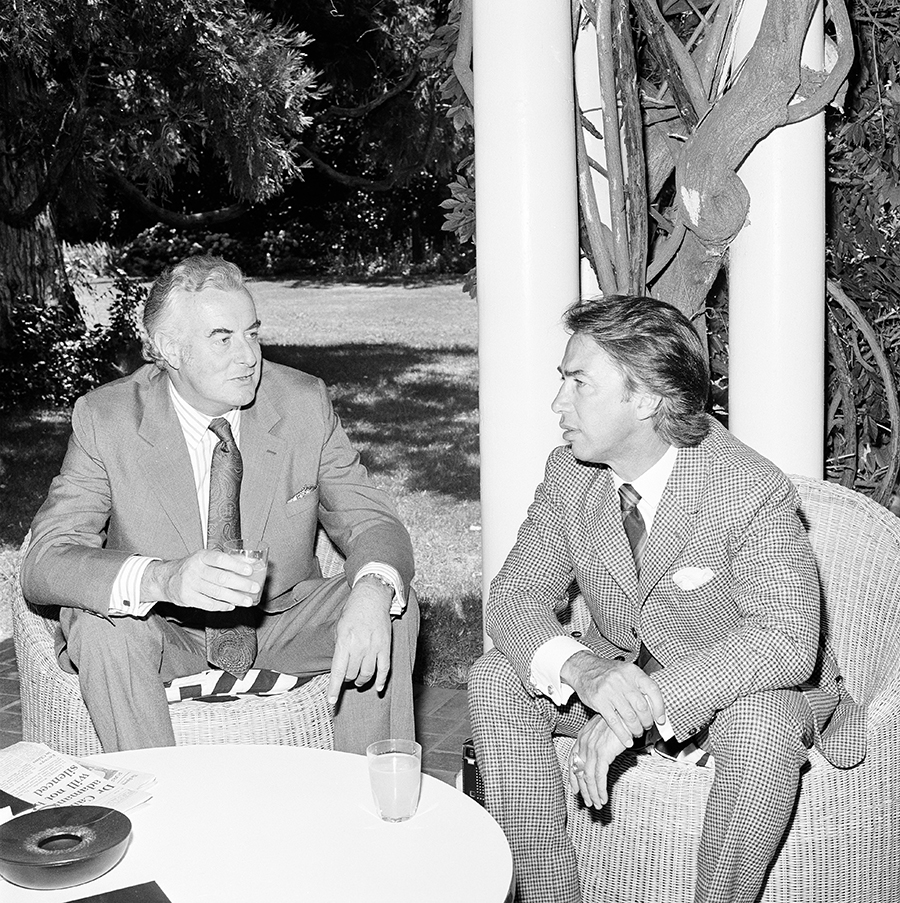
Dunstan meeting with Prime Minister Gough Whitlam in Canberra in 1973

Dunstan called an election for March 1973, hoping to gain a mandate to seek changes to the council. The LCL were badly disunited; the more liberal wing of the party under Hall joined Dunstan in wanting to introduce universal suffrage for the upper house, while the more conservative members of the LCL did not. The conservatives then decided to limit Hall's powers, resulting in his resignation and creation of the breakaway Liberal Movement (LM), which overtly branded itself as a semi-autonomous component within the LCL. Labor capitalised on the opposition divisions to secure an easy victory. They campaigned under the slogan "South Australia's Doing Well with Labor", while the LCL was hampered by infighting; many LCL candidates were claiming different leaders in their electoral material depending on their factional allegiance. The Labor Party won with 51.5% of the primary vote and secured a second consecutive majority government with 26 seats. It was only the second time a Labor government in South Australia had been re-elected for a second term, the first being the early Thomas Price Labor government. It would be the first five-year-incumbent Labor government however. They also gained two more seats in the Legislative Council to have six of the twenty members. Labor entered the new term with momentum when a fortnight after the election, the LCL purged LM members from its ranks, forcing them to either quit the LM or leave the LCL and join the LM as a distinct party.

Dunstan saw reform of the Legislative Council as an important goal, and later a prime achievement, of his Government. Labor, as a matter of party policy, wanted to see the Legislative Council abolished. Dunstan, seeing this as unfeasible in his term, set about to reform it instead. Two bills were prepared for Legislative Council reform; one to lower the voting age to 18 and introduce universal suffrage, and another to make councillors elected from a single statewide electorate under a system of proportional representation. The LCL initially blocked both bills, stating that it would accept them only if modifications were made to the second one. Changes were conceded; unlike the House of Assembly, voting would not be compulsory and the preference system was to be slightly altered. Once the amendments were made, the legislation was passed.

During his second term, Dunstan started efforts to build a petrochemical complex at Redcliff, near Port Augusta. Negotiations were held with several multinational companies, but nothing eventuated. Legislation was passed to create a Land Commission and introduce urban land price controls. However, a bill to create "a right to privacy" was defeated in the upper house after protests from journalists, as was legislation to mandate refunds to consumers for returning beverage containers and therefore promote recycling. In 1975, Dunstan declared Australia's first legal nude bathing reserve.

Dunstan (far left) distances his government from the Commonwealth. Dunstan to dump Whitlam, a cartoon by Stewart McCrae.

Prior to the 1975 federal and state elections, Australia, and South Australia in particular, had been hit by a series of economic problems. The 1973 oil crisis had massively increased the cost of living, domestic industry began to erode due to a lack of cost-competitiveness, and government funds were waning. In response, the Dunstan Government sold loss-making railways to the Commonwealth and brought in new taxes to allow wage rises. The changes had unexpected consequences: inflation, already high, increased markedly, and workers were still displeased with wages. The LCL, now known as the Liberal Party, had rebuilt after internal schism and had modernised to make themselves more appealing to the public. Having called an early election, Dunstan appealed to the electorate and pushed blame onto the Whitlam Government for South Australia's problems. In a television address just days before the election, he said: "My Government is being smeared and it hurts. They want you to think we are to blame for Canberra's mistakes. The vote on Saturday is not for Canberra, not for Australia, but for South Australia."

Labor remained the largest party in Parliament, but lost the two-party preferred vote at 49.2% and saw its numbers decrease from 26 to 23. The LCL held 20 seats, the Liberal Movement two, the Country Party one, and the last remaining with an independent, the nominally Labor Mayor of Port Pirie, Ted Connelly. Dunstan appealed to Connelly and offered him the role of Speaker. However, the reforms to the Legislative Council's election bore fruit. Of the 11 seats up for election, Labor won six with 47.3% of the vote, and the LM two, allowing Labor a total of 10 seats. This meant they could now, with the help of the LM, push through reforms opposed by the Liberals.

Dunstan continued to try to push through further legislation; he sought to expand on the Hall Government's electoral-boundaries reform, to bring it closer to one vote one value. The legislation sought to establish 47 electoral districts containing roughly equal numbers of voters (with a 10% tolerance). Redistributions were to be presided over by an independent boundaries commission. The bill passed with the support of the breakaway LM in the upper house – former Premier Steele Hall and his former Attorney-General Robin Millhouse.

One famous demonstration of Dunstan's charismatic style and media savvy came in January 1976. A psychic predicted that, due to Dunstan and the state's social liberalisation – which he saw as sinful – God would destroy Adelaide with a tsunami caused by an earthquake. This was publicised by the media, prompting a not insignificant number of residents to sell their property and leave; some businesses had clearance sales while many who decided to stay indulged in doomsday parties. Dunstan promised to stand on the seashore at Glenelg and wait for the imminent destruction. He did so on 20 January, the day of the predicted storm, and nothing happened, although he made newspaper headlines in the United Kingdom for his defiance.

In 1976, the Dunstan Government stepped up its legislative efforts. Some bills, such as the one to remove the sodomy law and decriminalise male homosexuality, had been initially blocked by the Legislative Council. However, the bill to abolish capital punishment passed with ease, and the homosexuality law reforms eventually passed in September. Rape law was properly codified and defined as a crime within marriage for the first time in Australia. Shopping hours, previously the most restrictive in the nation, became the most open. Following a royal commission, Friday night shopping was introduced for the city and Thursday night shopping for the suburbs. The deposits on beverage containers was finally passed. The first signs of Monarto's eventual failure began to appear: birth rates started dropping significantly, immigration slowed and the economy was stagnant. South Australia's robust population growth, previously the highest per capita among the states, came to an abrupt halt. However, state money continued to be poured into the Monarto project, despite the fact that the Whitlam government cut funding to $600,000 in 1975, while his Liberal successor Malcolm Fraser gave nothing at all the following year. However, by the time Monarto was eventually scrapped after Dunstan's departure, no less than $20 million had been used to buy land, plant trees and formulate development plans, and the failed project is often seen as Dunstan's greatest failure. In addition, the federal government removed subsidies for shipbuilding at Whyalla, forcing the operations to be scaled down.

After Oliphant's term had expired, Dunstan appointed the first Indigenous Australian Governor, Sir Douglas Nicholls, a former football player and clergyman. Following Nicholls' resignation due to ill health in 1977, a second consecutive clergyman took the post, Methodist Keith Seaman. However, this appointment was not successful; Seaman became involved in an unspecified scandal and made a statement admitting to a "grave impropriety", without elaborating further. He did not resign and kept a low profile from then on. Dunstan also appointed Dame Roma Mitchell to become the nation's first female Supreme Court judge.

Dunstan broke new ground in Australian politics with his policies on native title for Aboriginal people. The North West Aboriginal Reserve (NWAR) covered more than 7% of the state's land, and was inhabited by the Pitjantjatjara people. In 1977, when the NWAR was about to be transferred to the Aboriginal Lands Trust, a tribal delegation asked for the lands to be given to the traditional owners. Dunstan agreed to an investigation, and subsequently introduced the Pitjantjatjara Land Rights Bill. This bill proposed for a tribal body, the Anangu Pitjantjatjaraku, to take control of the NWAR and further lands after the claims were cleared by an independent tribunal. It also proposed to allow the body to decide mining proposals on the land and receive royalties. This aroused discontent among mining interests, but a bipartisan parliamentary committee endorsed the bill and it was tabled. However, Labor lost power before the bill was passed and although the new Liberal government said they would remove the mining restrictions, mass public rallies forced them to relent, and a bill similar to Dunstan's was passed. The legislation, the bedrock of which was laid by Dunstan, was the most reformist in Australia, and in the 1980s, more than 20% of the land was returned to its traditional owners.

Dunstan called another snap election in September at the 1977 election; he hoped to recover from the previous election, the outcome of which had been affected by the dismissal of the Federal Labor Government. As the remnants of the Playmander had been abolished, conditions were more favourable for Labor and they wanted to end their reliance on the casting vote of the speaker. The campaign proceeded smoothly and exploited the unpopularity of the federal Liberal government, using the jingle "Thank the Lord for South Australia". Labor won an absolute majority with 51.6% of the primary vote and 27 seats.

=== Salisbury affair and departure from office ===
Since 1949, there had been a "Special Branch" within the South Australian Police, for the purposes of surveillance and espionage. Conceived in 1939 an "intelligence branch", to maintain surveillance of the large German Australian community during World War II, it had amassed information on tens of thousands of individuals and organisations. While such an operation troubled Dunstan and his government because of civil liberties concerns, the branch's apparent party-political bias was even more worrying. In particular, it held information files on Labor parliamentarians, communists, church leaders and trade unionists, and so-called "pink files" on gay community activists which dated from the time before homosexuality was decriminalised. Although only two Labor MPs, from both federal and state parliaments, did not have files, the branch held significantly fewer files relating to Liberal Party figures. Dunstan had known of the existence of the branch since 1970, but said that he had been assured by the police commissioner that its files were not systematically focused on left-wing political figures.

However, Peter Ward, a journalist and former Dunstan staffer, published a story about the files. An inquiry was conducted into the Special Branch by Justice White of the Supreme Court of South Australia, and the report was placed in Dunstan's hands on 21 December 1977. It said the dossiers did exist and that they were "scandalously inaccurate, irrelevant to security purposes and outrageously unfair to hundreds, perhaps thousands, of loyal and worthy citizens". The report also noted that the files overwhelmingly focused on left-wing politicians and activists, and that Dunstan had been misled by the Police Commissioner, Harold Salisbury. After reviewing the findings, Dunstan sacked Salisbury in January and threatened to make the report public.

However, controversy erupted regarding the inquiry and Dunstan's subsequent actions because Salisbury had a reputation as a man of integrity. Ward claimed that Dunstan had known about the true contents of the files for several years. A Royal Commission under Justice Mitchell, set up at the instigation of the Liberals, investigated the matter. It cleared the Dunstan Government of any error, and did not find that it had known about the Special Branch's activities earlier. Dunstan had sacked Salisbury for misleading Parliament about the existence of the "pink files" and many of the Special Branch files were burnt. Salisbury retired to the United Kingdom with a $160,000 payout. Stewart Cockburn wrote a book, The Salisbury Affair, about the debacle.

There were initially no other major controversies for Dunstan, although the economy remained poor and the Redcliff complex was still in limbo, because an agreement with Dow was still to be finalised. The financial difficulties forced a freeze on public sector expansion and hospital developments, and there were claims of theft and mismanagement in the health system. However, the Liberal opposition was in a disorganised state and unpopular, so they were not able to pressure Dunstan effectively.

Towards the end of the year, political and media scrutiny of Dunstan began to grow, and he became uneasy in his dealings with the press. Soon after the Salisbury dismissal, he walked out of a stormy media conference after refusing to be drawn on the rumoured sacking of Seaman from the gubernatorial role. Increasing innuendo about Dunstan's private life, and allegations of corruption and economic mismanagement were worsened by Dunstan's self-righteous tendencies. The premier angrily denied claims that he was using government funds to build an opulent residence in Malaysia, as well as claims about his sexual lifestyle. He pre-emptively called a press conference on one occasion to denounce what he called "idiot rumours" and he further claimed that "reactionary forces" and "right-wing journalists" were engaged in a witchhunt against his "decent and responsible government".

Dunstan in 1979 announcing his sudden resignation in his pyjamas after collapsing and sleeping for forty hours. It was broadcast live on television, which was unheard of at the time in South Australia.

Dunstan also faced difficulties on policy issues. Factional cracks began to appear in the Labor Party, and the discovery of uranium deposits near the northern outback town of Roxby Downs put the premier in a bind. Mining the uranium promised to provide a valuable economic boost in difficult times, but a government ban on its mining, on safety grounds, was still in force. Dunstan was opposed to uranium mining but was seen as lacking conviction by environmentalists, and he was also being criticised by industrialists. By May, his approval rating had fallen to 57%, down from 80% just two years earlier, and unemployment was increasing. It was also widely anticipated that a book titled It's Grossly Improper would soon be released, containing embarrassing allegations about Dunstan's private life.

Together with Mike Rann, his press secretary and speechwriter (and later Premier), who had worked with him in 1978 on a series of speeches on Aboriginal Land Rights, industrial democracy and women's rights, Dunstan made a uranium fact-finding trip to Europe to study safe methods of generating nuclear power and of nuclear waste disposal. By the summer that followed Dunstan became extremely ill. When Parliament resumed, he collapsed on the floor of the House and was forced to use a walking stick; his doctor advised him that he required six months of rest to recover. The Liberal Opposition seized on the state of affairs and charged that the Labor Party was "as ailing as the man who led it". In a stage-managed press conference on 15 February 1979, Dunstan announced his retirement as premier from his room in Calvary Hospital, clearly shaking and wearing a dressing gown. The book, It's Grossly Improper, by two Adelaide journalists, Des Ryan and Mike McEwen, was published later that year.

Political scientist Andrew Parkin said one of Dunstan's main achievements was to debunk the notion that state governments and parliaments lacked the ability to make significant changes with profound impacts. As evidence, he cited Dunstan's sweeping social reforms and the fact that many other state governments followed South Australia's lead.

== Life after politics ==
After Dunstan's resignation from Parliament, deputy Des Corcoran took his place as party leader and Premier. At the subsequent Norwood by-election, Dunstan's seat was retained by Labor. Corcoran soon called the 1979 election, which left the party with only 19 seats against the Liberals on 25 seats on an 8.4 percent two-party swing against Labor. The Tonkin Liberal Government came to power and officially abandoned the Monarto project. Dunstan took a trip to Europe after being released from hospital, staying in Perugia for five months and pursuing Italian studies. He subsequently returned home and lived quietly in Adelaide for three years without finding work that appealed to him, such as that related to the shaping of public policy.

During this time, he became increasingly disillusioned with South Australian political affairs. A book by two Adelaide journalists, It's Grossly Improper, was released in November and sold out within a week. It alleged inappropriate use of government funds and a homosexual affair with a restaurateur, John Ceruto, in return for political favours. There was initial fanfare and speculation as to the authenticity of its claims; Dunstan dismissed the book as a "farrago of lies" in his 1981 memoirs, entitled Felicia.

From May 1980 to early 1981 he acted as editor for the magazine POL. In 1982, he moved to the neighbouring state of Victoria, and was appointed the Director of Tourism. This sparked an outcry in South Australia due to the two states' traditional rivalry. For his part, Dunstan said he had yearned to be given a role in shaping and building the future of his native state, but that he had been snubbed for three years. He said that public figures in South Australia had told him his high profile and ability to overshadow others could have caused a loss of face to them, and thus his departure would be seen favourably by them, while Victoria's offer gave him an opportunity to be constructive. Dunstan was appointed to the Victorian Economic Development Corporation on 12 July 1983, resigning on 23 June 1986. Dunstan stayed in the Director of Tourism role until 1986, when he returned to Adelaide after falling out with the government of John Cain. His retirement from these positions followed the provocative publication of a photograph of him with Monsignor Porcamadonna, member of the gay community Order of Perpetual Indulgence, taken after he had launched a collection of coming out stories by gay historian Gary Wotherspoon.

He was the national president of the Freedom from Hunger Campaign (1982–87), president of the Movement for Democracy in Fiji (from 1987), and national chairman of Community Aid Abroad (1992–93). Dunstan was an adjunct professor at the University of Adelaide from 1997 to 1999 and portrayed himself in the 1989 Australian independent film Against the Innocent.

In his retirement, Dunstan continued to be a passionate critic of economic rationalism (neoliberalism) and privatisation, particularly of South Australia's water, gas and electricity supplies. During the 1990s he wrote essays for the Adelaide Review magazine strongly criticising the Federal Labor Governments of Bob Hawke and Paul Keating, the Federal Liberal Government of John Howard and the State Liberal Governments of Dean Brown and John Olsen. He remained an advocate for multiculturalism and cultural diversity, often writing about the dangers of racism. A year before his death, the ailing Dunstan decried Labor's economic rationalism in front of 5,000 at the Gough Whitlam Lecture. Regardless of the acclaim in which he was held during his decade in power, Dunstan was largely overlooked for honours after leaving office and largely ignored by the state's elite. He was appointed a Companion of the Order of Australia in June 1979, and his former seat of Norwood was renamed Dunstan after him. The Dunstan Playhouse was later named to honour his contribution to the performing arts.

== Personal life ==
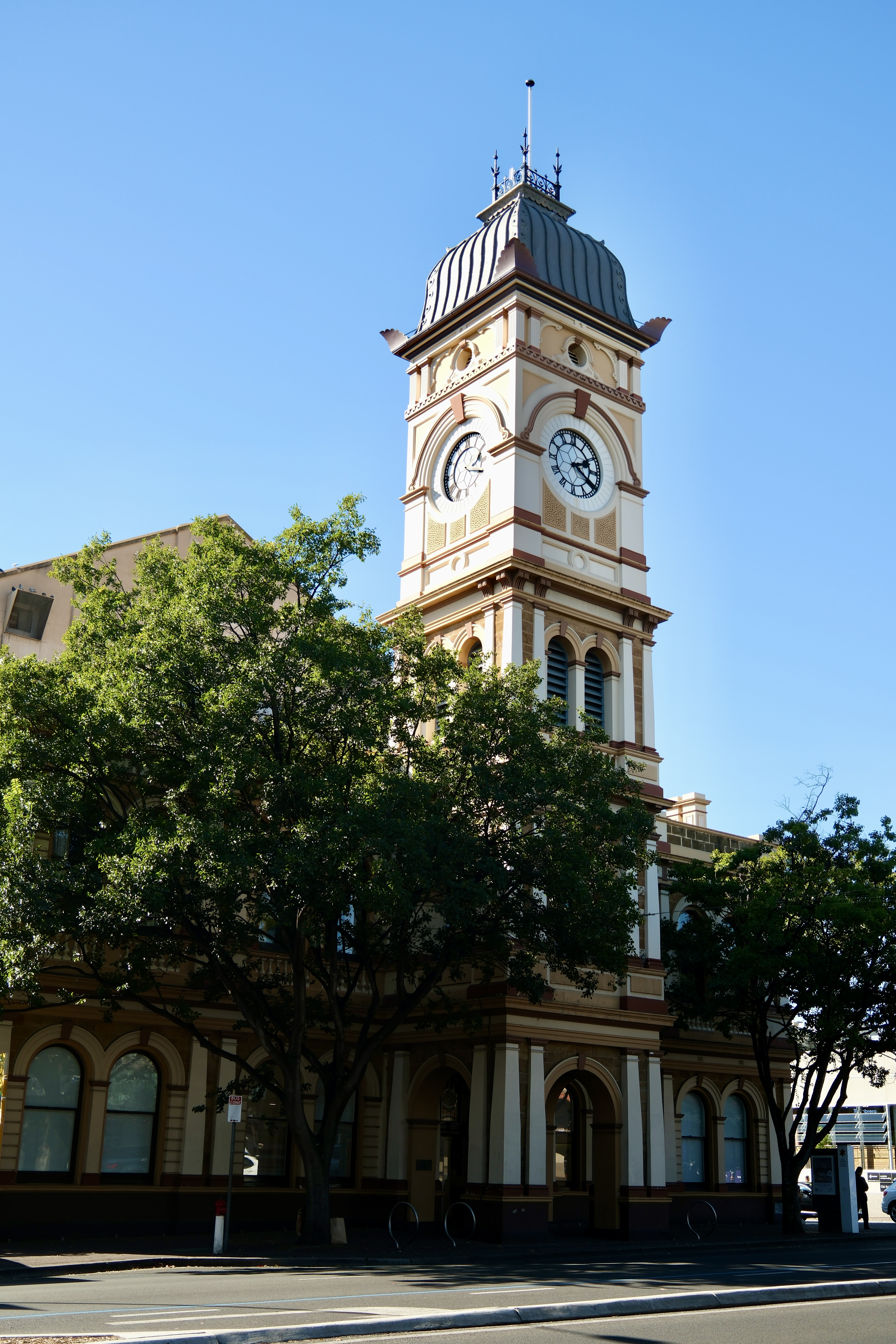
Dunstan is strongly associated with the suburb of Norwood. A memorial in his honour is embedded in the footpath outside the Norwood Town Hall (pictured).

Whilst living in Norwood and studying at university, Dunstan met his first wife, Gretel Elsasser, whose Jewish family had fled Nazi Germany to Australia. They married in 1949, and moved to Fiji. They returned to Adelaide in 1951 and settled in George Street, Norwood, with their young daughter, Bronwen. The family was forced to live in squalor for a number of years while Dunstan established his legal practice; during this time, they took in boarders as a source of extra income. Gretel later gave birth to two sons, Andrew and Paul.

Dunstan was married twice. In 1972, Dunstan separated from his wife and moved into a small flat in Kent Town, adjacent to Norwood. The family home was sold as two of the children were already studying in university. In 1974, the couple were finally divorced. Dunstan notes this period as being initially a "very bleak and lonely" time for him. In absence of his family, he made new friends and acquaintances. Friends living nearby would come to his apartment for conversation and good food – cooking was Dunstan's hobby. Dunstan bought another house in 1974, partially financed from a then-unpublished cookbook. In 1976, Don Dunstan's Cookbook was published – the first cookbook released by a serving Australian leader. More generally, Dunstan promoted a revolution in fine dining in the state. Encouraged by Dunstan's enthusiasm for multiculturalism, many new restaurants were opened by proprietors and the diversity of cuisine increased. He also promoted the viticulture industry through his patronage of wine festivals.

In 1973, Adele Koh, a Malaysian Chinese journalist who had previously lived in Singapore, was appointed to work for Dunstan. She had been employed at the Singapore Herald, which was closed by the Singaporean government under Lee Kuan Yew on allegations of being "funded by questionable foreign sources". Following this, she relocated to Australia. The two began a relationship in 1974, and married in 1976 in a small ceremony at Dunstan's residence. Dunstan, who was in his 50s by this point, much older than Adele, who was in her 30s. She was diagnosed with advanced lung cancer in May 1978, and died in October after Dunstan had cared for her at her bedside for months. Her death seriously affected him and his own health began to suffer.

Although Dunstan never publicly commented on his sexuality, it has been said that he "lived as a sexually liberated bisexual man". In 1986, he met his future partner, Steven Cheng, a post-graduate science student then in his twenties. Together, they opened a restaurant called "Don's Table" in 1994. He lived with Cheng in their Norwood home for the rest of his life. Cheng nursed Dunstan through lung cancer until his death, and Dunstan bequeathed their home to Cheng for life.

== Death ==
In 1993, Dunstan was diagnosed with an aggressive throat cancer and then an inoperable lung cancer, which led to his death on 6 February 1999. Dunstan was not a smoker but was long exposed to passive smoking. A public memorial service was held on 9 February at the Adelaide Festival Centre as a tribute to Dunstan's love of the arts. In attendance were former Labor Prime Ministers Gough Whitlam and Bob Hawke, Federal Opposition Leader Kim Beazley, Premier John Olsen, and State Opposition Leader Mike Rann. Thousands more gathered outside the centre in Elder Park along the banks of the River Torrens. State flags were flown at half-mast and the memorial service was televised live.

== Legacy ==
A theatre in the Festival Centre was renamed the Dunstan Playhouse.

The Electoral Commission of South Australia's 2012 redistribution included renaming the seat of Norwood to Dunstan which came into existence as of the 2014 election. In 2014 a biography Don Dunstan Intimacy & Liberty by Dino Hodge, written with the co-operation of Dunstan's family and former lovers, was published.

In 1988, Dunstan gave the Flinders University Library a collection of files about his personal, professional, and political life as well as pictures, press clippings, speeches, press releases, audiovisual materials, books from his library, some clothing, and other memorabilia. These materials can be viewed and accessed for research purposes.

=== Don Dunstan Foundation ===
The Don Dunstan Foundation was established by Dunstan at the University of Adelaide in 1999, shortly before his death, to push for progressive change and to honour Dunstan's memory. Dunstan had spent his last months helping to lay the platform for its establishment. At the inauguration of the body Dunstan had said, "What we need is a concentration on the kind of agenda which I followed and I hope that my death will be useful in this."

The Foundation aims to represent and advocate for the values of its founder, such as cultural diversity, fair distribution of wealth, human rights advocacy, and Indigenous rights in Australia. Among other initiatives, it runs a series of annual events, such as a conference on homelessness, the IPAA Don Dunstan Oration, the Hugo Lecture, AdMental, Southgate Oration, and Human Rights Oration. The Lowitja O'Donoghue Oration has been held annually since 2007, with a series of speakers illuminating aspects of Indigenous Australians' past and future in Australian society. It is held each year in Reconciliation Week. Orators have been chosen by O'Donoghue, until her death in February 2024.

On 3 June 2020, Jane Lomax-Smith was announced as new chair of the organisation, taking over from Lynn Arnold, who had held the position for 10 years and remains on the Board as Director and Patron as of June 2022.

=== Don Dunstan Award ===
Since its commencement in 2003, the Adelaide Film Festival has presented The Don Dunstan Award in recognition of outstanding contribution by an individual to the Australian film industry. Deemed by the Adelaide Film Festival's Board to have "enriched Australian screen culture through their work", its recipients include David Gulpilil, Rolf de Heer, and Scott Hicks. After receiving the award in 2013, Hicks acknowledged Dunstan's vision for the creation of a film industry in South Australia as being instrumental to his professional development.

Parliament of South Australia
Preceded by Roy Moir	Member for Norwood; 1953–1979	Succeeded by Greg Crafter
Political offices
Preceded by Colin Rowe	Attorney-General of South Australia; 1965–1968	Succeeded by Robin Millhouse
Preceded by Frank Walsh	Treasurer of South Australia; 1967–1968	Succeeded by Glen Pearson
Preceded by Frank Walsh	Premier of South Australia; 1967–1968	Succeeded by Steele Hall
Preceded by Steele Hall	Leader of the Opposition of South Australia; 1968–1970	Succeeded by Steele Hall
Preceded by Steele Hall	Premier of South Australia; 1970–1979	Succeeded by Des Corcoran
Preceded by Steele Hall	Treasurer of South Australia; 1970–1979	Succeeded by Des Corcoran
Preceded by Lyell McEwin	Father of the Parliament of South Australia; 1975–1979	Succeeded by Ren DeGaris
Preceded by Len King	Attorney-General of South Australia; 1975	Succeeded by Peter Duncan
Party political offices
Preceded by Frank Walsh	Leader of the Australian Labor Party (South Australian Branch); 1967–1979	Succeeded by Des Corcoran
