= Electoral district of Ascot Park =

Former South Australian state electoral district

Coordinates: 34°59′S 138°34′E

Ascot Park South Australia—House of Assembly
- State: South Australia
- Created: 1970
- Abolished: 1985
- Namesake: Ascot Park, South Australia
- Demographic: Metropolitan

Ascot Park was an electoral district of the House of Assembly in the Australian state of South Australia from 1970 to 1985. It was preceded by the seat of Edwardstown and replaced by the seat of Walsh.

At the 2018 state election, the suburb of Ascot Park was located in the Labor seat of Badcoe.

== Members ==
Member	Party	Term
Geoff Virgo	Labor	1970–1979
John Trainer	Labor	1979–1985
