= Howard Venning =

Australian politician

Howard Maxwell Venning
- Born: 5 April 1915; Crystal Brook, South Australia
- Died: 6 January 1995 (aged 79)
- Spouse: Shirley Olive Fuller
- Children: Ivan Venning
- Parent(s): Howard Venning and Annie Olive nee Sargent
- Relatives: Tom Venning (grandson)

Member of the South Australian House of Assembly for Rocky River
- In office 1968–1979
- Preceded by: James Heaslip
- Succeeded by: John Olsen

Howard Maxwell Venning (5 April 1915 – 1 June 1995) was an Australian politician who represented the South Australian House of Assembly seat of Electoral district of Rocky River for the Liberal and Country League and Liberal Party from 1968 to 1979.

Parliament of South Australia
Preceded by James Heaslip	Member for Rocky River; 1968–1979	Succeeded by John Olsen
