= Michael Wilson (Australian politician) =

Australian politician

Michael Minell Wilson AM (born 9 January 1934) is a former South Australian politician and MP in the House of Assembly from 1977 to 1985 for the Liberal Party, representing the Electoral district of Torrens. He oversaw the construction of the Adelaide O-Bahn Busway whilst in office as Transport Minister.

He was the second candidate on the Liberal Movement Senate ticket in South Australia at the 1975 federal election.

In the 2005 Queen's Birthday Honours Wilson was appointed a Member of the Order of Australia (AM) for "service to the community, particularly through the United Nations International Children's Emergency Fund, and to the South Australian Parliament".
