= Geoff Virgo =

Australian politician

Geoff Virgo AM
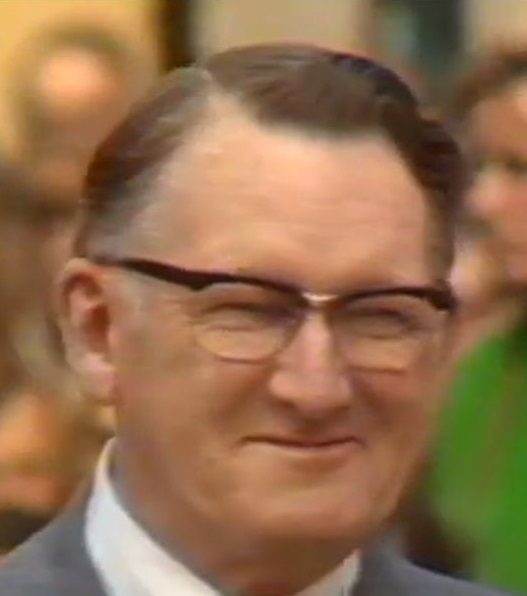

Minister of Transport
- In office 2 June 1970 – 18 September 1979
- Premier: Don Dunstan; Des Corcoran
- Preceded by: Murray Hill
- Succeeded by: Michael Wilson

Minister of Marine
- In office 15 March 1979 – 18 September 1979
- Premier: Des Corcoran
- Preceded by: Des Corcoran
- Succeeded by: Allan Rodda

Minister of Local Government
- In office 2 June 1970 – 15 March 1979
- Premier: Don Dunstan
- Preceded by: Murray Hill

Member of Parliament
- In office 2 March 1968 – 14 September 1979
- Constituency: Edwardstown (1968-1970); Ascot Park (1970-1979)

Personal details
- Born: Geoffrey Thomas Virgo; 9 November 1918 North Adelaide, South Australia
- Died: 5 January 2001 (aged 82) Glengowrie, South Australia
- Citizenship: Australia
- Party: Labor

Geoffrey Thomas Virgo (9 November 1918 – 5 January 2001) was an Australian politician.

== Political career ==
From 2 March 1968 to 29 May 1970 he represented the electoral district of Edwardstown in the South Australian House of Assembly as a member of the Labor Party. The district of Edwardstown was abolished in May 1970 after a Boundary Redistribution. From 30 May 1970 to 14 September 1979 he represented the electoral district of Ascot Park in the South Australian House of Assembly as a member of the Australian Labor Party.

Virgo was the Minister of Roads and Transport from 2 June 1970 until 19 April 1973. Virgo was also the Minister of Local Government from 2 June 1970 through 15 March 1979. On 19 April 1973 the Ministry of Roads and Transport was abolished and Virgo became the Minister of Transport through 18 September 1979. From 15 March 1979 until 18 September 1979 Virgo was also the Minister of Marine.

He was responsible for the founding of Rundle Mall, and opened it with Premier Dunstan on 1 September 1976.

He did not stand for re-election at the 1979 election. His Labor Party colleague, John Trainer, succeed in replacing him as the elected member for Ascot Park – although the Liberal Party managed to form a majority government.
