= Electoral results for the district of Gumeracha =

South Australian district election results

This is a list of election results for the electoral district of Gumeracha in South Australian elections.

== Members for Gumeracha ==
First incarnation (1857–1902)
Member	Party	Term	Member	Party	Term
Arthur Blyth		1857–1868	Alexander Hay		1857–1861
Arthur Blyth		1857–1868	Alexander Murray		1862–1867
Arthur Blyth		1857–1868	Alexander Hay		1867–1870
William Sandover		1868–1870	Alexander Hay		1867–1870
Arthur Blyth		1870–1875	Ebenezer Ward		1870–1880
Frederick Hannaford		1875–1878	Ebenezer Ward		1870–1880
William Haines		1878–1884	Ebenezer Ward		1870–1880
William Haines		1878–1884	John Rounsevell		1880–1881
William Haines		1878–1884	Samuel Tomkinson		1881–1884
Robert Homburg		1884–1891	Robert Ross		1884–1887
Robert Homburg		1884–1891	Lancelot Stirling		1888–1890
Robert Homburg		1884–1891	Theodore Hack		1890–1893
Robert Homburg	Defence League	1891–1896	William Randell	Defence League	1893–1896
Robert Homburg	Defence League	1891–1896	Charles Willcox	Defence League	1896–1896
Robert Homburg		1896–1902	William Randell		1896–1899
Robert Homburg		1896–1902	Thomas Playford II		1899–1901
Robert Homburg		1896–1902	William Jamieson	National League	1901–1902

Second incarnation (1938–1970)
Member	Party	Term
Thomas Playford IV	Liberal and Country	1938–1968
Bryant Giles	Liberal and Country	1968–1970

== Election results ==
=== Elections in the 1960s ===
1968 South Australian state election: Gumeracha
Party	Candidate	Votes	%	±%
Liberal and Country	Bryant Giles	4,740	67.9	+3.1
Labor	Cyril Swaine	2,245	32.1	+10.6
Total formal votes		6,985	98.4	+0.5
Informal votes		115	1.6	−0.5
Turnout		7,100	91.7	−4.5
Liberal and Country hold		Swing	−5.2	

1965 South Australian state election: Gumeracha
Party	Candidate	Votes	%	±%
Liberal and Country	Thomas Playford	4,365	64.8	−16.3
Labor	Ernie Crimes	1,449	21.5	+21.5
Democratic Labor	Patrick Coffey	420	6.2	−12.7
Social Credit	Marcus Dodd	375	5.6	+5.6
Communist	Brian Rooney	130	1.9	+1.9
Total formal votes		6,739	97.9	+2.5
Informal votes		143	2.1	−2.5
Turnout		6,882	96.2	+0.4
Two-party-preferred result
Liberal and Country	Thomas Playford	4,923	73.1	−8.0
Labor	Ernie Crimes	1,816	26.9	+26.9
Liberal and Country hold		Swing	N/A	

1962 South Australian state election: Gumeracha
Party	Candidate	Votes	%	±%
Liberal and Country	Thomas Playford	5,202	81.1	+7.7
Democratic Labor	Patrick Coffey	1,211	18.9	+18.9
Total formal votes		6,413	95.4	−3.0
Informal votes		309	4.6	+3.0
Turnout		6,722	95.8	+0.2
Liberal and Country hold		Swing	N/A	

=== Elections in the 1950s ===
1959 South Australian state election: Gumeracha
Party	Candidate	Votes	%	±%
Liberal and Country	Thomas Playford	4,781	73.4	−15.2
Labor	Ernie Crimes	1,333	20.5	+20.5
Independent	Charles Coffey	404	6.2	+6.2
Total formal votes		6,518	98.4	+2.3
Informal votes		107	1.6	−2.3
Turnout		6,625	95.6	+0.8
Two-party-preferred result
Liberal and Country	Thomas Playford		76.4	−12.2
Labor	Ernie Crimes		23.6	+23.6
Liberal and Country hold		Swing	N/A	

- Two party preferred vote was estimated.

1956 South Australian state election: Gumeracha
Party	Candidate	Votes	%	±%
Liberal and Country	Thomas Playford	5,457	88.6	
Communist	Fred Slater	705	11.4	
Total formal votes		6,162	96.1	
Informal votes		251	3.9	
Turnout		6,413	94.8	
Liberal and Country hold		Swing		

1953 South Australian state election: Gumeracha
Party	Candidate	Votes	%	±%
Liberal and Country	Thomas Playford	5,315	90.4	−9.6
Communist	Alan Finger	566	9.6	+9.6
Total formal votes		5,881	95.1	
Informal votes		302	4.9	
Turnout		6,183	96.2	
Liberal and Country hold		Swing	N/A	

1950 South Australian state election: Gumeracha
Party	Candidate	Votes	%	±%
Liberal and Country	Thomas Playford	unopposed		
Liberal and Country hold		Swing		

=== Elections in the 1940s ===
1947 South Australian state election: Gumeracha
Party	Candidate	Votes	%	±%
Liberal and Country	Thomas Playford	unopposed		
Liberal and Country hold		Swing		

1944 South Australian state election: Gumeracha
Party	Candidate	Votes	%	±%
Liberal and Country	Thomas Playford	3,752	72.1	−27.9
Labor	Wilfred Holmes	1,451	27.9	+27.9
Total formal votes		5,203	98.2	
Informal votes		95	1.8	
Turnout		5,298	89.5	
Liberal and Country hold		Swing	N/A	

1941 South Australian state election: Gumeracha
Party	Candidate	Votes	%	±%
Liberal and Country	Thomas Playford	unopposed		
Liberal and Country hold		Swing		

=== Elections in the 1930s ===
1938 South Australian state election: Gumeracha
Party	Candidate	Votes	%	±%
Liberal and Country	Thomas Playford	2,081	65.3	
Independent	Robert Hunter	556	17.5	
Labor	Arthur Edwards	549	17.2	
Total formal votes		3,186	98.3	
Informal votes		55	1.7	
Turnout		3,241	56.4	
Liberal and Country hold		Swing		

- Preferences were not distributed.
