= Results of the 1965 South Australian state election (House of Assembly) =

South Australian state election, 6 March 1965 House of Assembly << 1962–1968 >>
Enrolled voters	562,824				
Votes cast	513,064		Turnout	94.59%	+0.61%
Informal votes	14,424		Informal	2.81%	+0.35%
Summary of votes by party
Party	Primary votes	%	Swing	Seats	Change
Labor	274,432	55.04%	+1.06%	21	+ 2
Liberal and Country	179,183	35.93%	+1.43%	17	– 1
Democratic Labor	21,679	4.35%	–3.40%	0	± 0
Social Credit	9,553	1.92%	+1.92%	0	± 0
National	2,227	0.45%	+0.45%	0	± 0
Communist	2,214	0.44%	–0.18%	0	± 0
Independent	9,352	1.88%	–1.27%	1	– 1
Total	498,640			39	
Two-party-preferred
Labor		54.30%	0.00%		
Liberal and Country		45.70%	0.00%		

This is a list of House of Assembly results for the 1965 South Australian state election.

== Results by electoral district ==
=== Adelaide ===
1965 South Australian state election: Adelaide
Party	Candidate	Votes	%	±%
Labor	Sam Lawn	10,444	72.9	−4.0
Democratic Labor	George Basivovs	2,372	16.6	−1.9
Social Credit	Thomas Ellis	774	5.4	+5.4
Communist	Elliott Johnston	746	5.2	+0.6
Total formal votes		14,336	92.9	−2.1
Informal votes		1,100	7.1	+2.1
Turnout		15,436	91.9	+0.8
Two-candidate-preferred result
Labor	Sam Lawn	11,204	78.2	−2.1
Democratic Labor	George Basivovs	3,132	21.8	+2.1
Labor hold		Swing	−2.1	

=== Albert ===
1965 South Australian state election: Albert
Party	Candidate	Votes	%	±%
Liberal and Country	Bill Nankivell	unopposed		
Liberal and Country hold		Swing		

=== Alexandra ===
1965 South Australian state election: Alexandra
Party	Candidate	Votes	%	±%
Liberal and Country	David Brookman	5,557	57.7	−1.1
Labor	Desmond Merton	4,068	42.3	+10.5
Total formal votes		9,625	98.1	−0.5
Informal votes		185	1.9	+0.5
Turnout		9,810	95.8	+0.1
Liberal and Country hold		Swing	−5.8	

=== Angas ===
1965 South Australian state election: Angas
Party	Candidate	Votes	%	±%
Liberal and Country	Berthold Teusner	unopposed		
Liberal and Country hold		Swing		

=== Barossa ===
1965 South Australian state election: Barossa
Party	Candidate	Votes	%	±%
Labor	Molly Byrne	6,015	51.5	+51.5
Liberal and Country	Condor Laucke	5,405	46.2	−39.7
Social Credit	David Wood	165	1.4	+1.4
Democratic Labor	Andrew Shore	104	0.9	+0.9
Total formal votes		11,689	98.6	+5.7
Informal votes		170	1.4	−5.7
Turnout		11,859	95.6	+1.2
Two-party-preferred result
Labor	Molly Byrne	6,113	52.3	+52.3
Liberal and Country	Condor Laucke	5,576	47.7	−38.2
Labor gain from Liberal and Country		Swing	N/A	

=== Burnside ===
1965 South Australian state election: Burnside
Party	Candidate	Votes	%	±%
Liberal and Country	Joyce Steele	18,394	59.6	+1.1
Labor	Joyce Henriott	10,864	35.2	+0.8
Social Credit	William Carruthers	1,624	5.3	+5.3
Total formal votes		30,882	97.4	−0.3
Informal votes		821	2.6	+0.3
Turnout		31,703	94.2	0.0
Two-party-preferred result
Liberal and Country	Joyce Steele	19,206	62.2	−2.0
Labor	Joyce Henriott	11,676	37.8	+2.0
Liberal and Country hold		Swing	−2.0	

=== Burra ===
1965 South Australian state election: Burra
Party	Candidate	Votes	%	±%
Liberal and Country	Percy Quirke	3,467	62.3	+18.8
Labor	John Phelan	2,101	37.7	+37.7
Total formal votes		5,568	98.6	−0.2
Informal votes		78	1.4	+0.2
Turnout		5,646	95.9	+0.2
Liberal and Country gain from Independent		Swing	N/A	

=== Chaffey ===
1965 South Australian state election: Chaffey
Party	Candidate	Votes	%	±%
Labor	Reg Curren	3,449	48.6	−1.5
Liberal and Country	Harold King	3,356	47.3	−2.6
Independent	Herbert Wilson	169	2.4	+2.4
Democratic Labor	William Ahern	124	1.8	+1.8
Total formal votes		7,098	97.4	−0.4
Informal votes		189	2.6	+0.4
Turnout		7,287	95.9	0.0
Two-party-preferred result
Labor	Reg Curren	3,599	50.7	+0.6
Liberal and Country	Harold King	3,499	49.3	−0.6
Labor hold		Swing	+0.6	

=== Edwardstown ===
1965 South Australian state election: Edwardstown
Party	Candidate	Votes	%	±%
Labor	Frank Walsh	17,917	60.4	−11.2
Liberal and Country	Laurence Daly	9,578	32.3	+32.3
Democratic Labor	Allan Anderson	1,894	6.4	−22.0
Independent	Brian Waters	297	1.0	+1.0
Total formal votes		29,686	98.0	+1.9
Informal votes		599	2.0	−1.9
Turnout		30,285	94.9	+0.2
Two-party-preferred result
Labor	Frank Walsh	18,350	61.8	−9.8
Liberal and Country	Laurence Daly	11,336	38.2	+38.2
Labor hold		Swing	N/A	

=== Enfield ===
1965 South Australian state election: Enfield
Party	Candidate	Votes	%	±%
Labor	Jack Jennings	21,951	61.2	−16.5
Liberal and Country	Allan Stock	9,125	25.4	+25.4
Social Credit	David Beavan	2,947	8.2	+8.2
Democratic Labor	Desmond Timlin	1,409	3.9	−18.4
Communist	Alan Miller	434	1.2	+1.2
Total formal votes		35,866	96.5	+0.7
Informal votes		1,301	3.5	−0.7
Turnout		37,167	95.1	+1.2
Two-party-preferred result
Labor	Jack Jennings	24,025	67.0	−10.7
Liberal and Country	Allan Stock	11,841	33.0	+33.0
Labor hold		Swing	N/A	

=== Eyre ===
1965 South Australian state election: Eyre
Party	Candidate	Votes	%	±%
Liberal and Country	George Bockelberg	3,206	46.8	−53.2
Labor	Isaac Rayson	1,843	26.9	+26.9
National	Harold Schiller	1,806	26.4	+26.4
Total formal votes		6,855	98.4	
Informal votes		110	1.6	
Turnout		6,965	95.6	
Two-party-preferred result
Liberal and Country	George Bockelberg	4,130	60.2	−39.8
Labor	Isaac Rayson	2,725	39.8	+39.8
Liberal and Country hold		Swing	N/A	

=== Flinders ===
1965 South Australian state election: Flinders
Party	Candidate	Votes	%	±%
Liberal and Country	Glen Pearson	3,678	53.6	+0.1
Labor	James Hudson	2,680	39.0	−7.5
Democratic Labor	Douglas Barnes	508	7.4	+7.4
Total formal votes		6,866	98.6	+0.4
Informal votes		97	1.4	−0.4
Turnout		6,963	96.3	+0.8
Two-party-preferred result
Liberal and Country	Glen Pearson	4,110	59.9	+6.4
Labor	James Hudson	2,756	40.1	−6.4
Liberal and Country hold		Swing	+6.4	

=== Frome ===
1965 South Australian state election: Frome
Party	Candidate	Votes	%	±%
Labor	Tom Casey	2,666	57.9	+2.3
Liberal and Country	Maxwell Hams	1,799	39.0	−1.3
Democratic Labor	John McMahon	142	3.1	−1.0
Total formal votes		4,607	98.5	+0.5
Informal votes		68	1.5	−0.5
Turnout		4,675	92.4	+0.9
Two-party-preferred result
Labor	Tom Casey	2,687	58.3	+2.1
Liberal and Country	Maxwell Hams	1,920	41.7	−2.1
Labor hold		Swing	+2.1	

=== Gawler ===
1965 South Australian state election: Gawler
Party	Candidate	Votes	%	±%
Labor	John Clark	16,413	64.8	−1.5
Liberal and Country	Phillip Hockey	6,441	25.4	−4.1
Independent	Desmond Clark	1,893	7.5	+7.5
Independent	John Fielder	569	2.3	+2.3
Total formal votes		25,316	97.5	−0.4
Informal votes		651	2.5	+0.4
Turnout		25,967	94.0	+1.6
Two-party-preferred result
Labor	John Clark	17,644	69.7	+2.8
Liberal and Country	Phillip Hockey	7,672	30.3	−2.8
Labor hold		Swing	+2.8	

=== Glenelg ===
1965 South Australian state election: Glenelg
Party	Candidate	Votes	%	±%
Labor	Hugh Hudson	16,869	51.5	+7.4
Liberal and Country	Baden Pattinson	14,613	44.6	−5.3
Democratic Labor	Mark Posa	1,267	3.9	−2.1
Total formal votes		32,749	98.6	+0.1
Informal votes		457	1.4	−0.1
Turnout		33,206	95.0	+0.8
Two-party-preferred result
Labor	Hugh Hudson	17,059	52.1	+5.4
Liberal and Country	Baden Pattinson	15,690	47.9	−5.4
Labor gain from Liberal and Country		Swing	+5.4	

=== Gouger ===
1965 South Australian state election: Gouger
Party	Candidate	Votes	%	±%
Liberal and Country	Steele Hall	5,384	63.5	−36.5
Labor	Robert Thredgold	3,094	36.5	+36.5
Total formal votes		8,478	97.4	
Informal votes		223	2.6	
Turnout		8,701	95.4	
Liberal and Country hold		Swing	N/A	

=== Gumeracha ===
1965 South Australian state election: Gumeracha
Party	Candidate	Votes	%	±%
Liberal and Country	Thomas Playford	4,365	64.8	−16.3
Labor	Ernie Crimes	1,449	21.5	+21.5
Democratic Labor	Patrick Coffey	420	6.2	−12.7
Social Credit	Marcus Dodd	375	5.6	+5.6
Communist	Brian Rooney	130	1.9	+1.9
Total formal votes		6,739	97.9	+2.5
Informal votes		143	2.1	−2.5
Turnout		6,882	96.2	+0.4
Two-party-preferred result
Liberal and Country	Thomas Playford	4,923	73.1	−8.0
Labor	Ernie Crimes	1,816	26.9	+26.9
Liberal and Country hold		Swing	N/A	

=== Hindmarsh ===
1965 South Australian state election: Hindmarsh
Party	Candidate	Votes	%	±%
Labor	Cyril Hutchens	16,241	80.1	−19.9
Democratic Labor	Cyril Holasek	4,024	19.9	+19.9
Total formal votes		20,265	94.7	
Informal votes		1,136	5.3	
Turnout		21,401	94.2	
Labor hold		Swing	N/A	

=== Light ===
1965 South Australian state election: Light
Party	Candidate	Votes	%	±%
Liberal and Country	John Freebairn	unopposed		
Liberal and Country hold		Swing		

=== Millicent ===
1965 South Australian state election: Millicent
Party	Candidate	Votes	%	±%
Labor	Des Corcoran	4,160	61.8	+8.7
Liberal and Country	John Osborne	2,569	38.2	−7.1
Total formal votes		6,729	98.8	−0.5
Informal votes		78	1.2	+0.5
Turnout		6,807	95.0	−1.5
Labor hold		Swing	+8.5	

=== Mitcham ===
1965 South Australian state election: Mitcham
Party	Candidate	Votes	%	±%
Liberal and Country	Robin Millhouse	15,015	65.6	+1.8
Labor	Murty Conlon	7,427	32.4	+2.0
Social Credit	Ernst Hergstrom	454	2.0	+2.0
Total formal votes		22,896	98.2	−0.6
Informal votes		441	1.8	+0.6
Turnout		23,337	93.8	+1.3
Two-party-preferred result
Liberal and Country	Robin Millhouse	15,242	66.6	−2.2
Labor	Murty Conlon	7,654	33.4	+2.2
Liberal and Country hold		Swing	−2.2	

=== Mount Gambier ===
1965 South Australian state election: Mount Gambier
Party	Candidate	Votes	%	±%
Labor	Allan Burdon	5,399	60.6	−8.1
Liberal and Country	Mary Hill	3,507	39.4	+8.1
Total formal votes		8,906	98.2	−0.4
Informal votes		166	1.8	+0.4
Turnout		9,072	94.5	−0.5
Labor hold		Swing	−8.1	

=== Murray ===
1965 South Australian state election: Murray
Party	Candidate	Votes	%	±%
Labor	Gabe Bywaters	5,144	67.1	−3.5
Liberal and Country	Eric Doecke	2,522	32.9	+3.5
Total formal votes		7,666	98.1	−0.3
Informal votes		152	1.9	+0.3
Turnout		7,818	96.3	0.0
Labor hold		Swing	−3.5	

=== Norwood ===
1965 South Australian state election: Norwood
Party	Candidate	Votes	%	±%
Labor	Don Dunstan	10,452	57.6	−0.5
Liberal and Country	Sidney Daws	7,679	42.4	+5.2
Total formal votes		18,131	96.7	−1.4
Informal votes		610	3.3	+1.4
Turnout		18,741	93.4	−0.4
Labor hold		Swing	−1.2	

=== Onkaparinga ===
1965 South Australian state election: Onkaparinga
Party	Candidate	Votes	%	±%
Liberal and Country	Howard Shannon	3,836	57.1	+0.7
Labor	Frank Staniford	2,608	38.8	−4.8
Social Credit	Harvey Burns	278	4.1	+4.1
Total formal votes		6,722	98.2	+2.4
Informal votes		122	1.8	−2.4
Turnout		6,844	95.8	0.0
Two-party-preferred result
Liberal and Country	Howard Shannon	3,975	59.1	+2.7
Labor	Frank Staniford	2,747	40.9	−2.7
Liberal and Country hold		Swing	+2.7	

=== Port Adelaide ===
1965 South Australian state election: Port Adelaide
Party	Candidate	Votes	%	±%
Labor	John Ryan	15,460	76.8	−6.5
Democratic Labor	Donald Boys	3,768	18.7	+5.6
Communist	Peter Symon	904	4.5	+0.9
Total formal votes		20,132	94.3	−1.7
Informal votes		1,216	5.7	+1.7
Turnout		21,348	94.7	+1.1
Two-candidate-preferred result
Labor	John Ryan	16,228	80.6	−5.7
Democratic Labor	Donald Boys	3,904	19.4	+5.7
Labor hold		Swing	−5.7	

=== Port Pirie ===
1965 South Australian state election: Port Pirie
Party	Candidate	Votes	%	±%
Labor	Dave McKee	5,468	89.4	−1.4
Independent	Allan Mossop	649	10.6	+10.6
Total formal votes		6,117	96.8	−0.1
Informal votes		204	3.2	+0.1
Turnout		6,321	96.2	+1.4
Labor hold		Swing	−1.4	

=== Ridley ===
1965 South Australian state election: Ridley
Party	Candidate	Votes	%	±%
Independent	Tom Stott	4,483	66.9	+28.2
Labor	Arnold Busbridge	2,215	33.1	+8.1
Total formal votes		6,698	98.4	−0.6
Informal votes		106	1.6	+0.6
Turnout		6,804	98.0	+1.8
Independent hold		Swing	N/A	

=== Rocky River ===
1965 South Australian state election: Rocky River
Party	Candidate	Votes	%	±%
Liberal and Country	James Heaslip	3,652	66.6	−33.4
Labor	George Smart	1,832	33.4	+33.4
Total formal votes		5,484	98.3	
Informal votes		96	1.7	
Turnout		5,580	96.5	
Liberal and Country hold		Swing	N/A	

=== Semaphore ===
1965 South Australian state election: Semaphore
Party	Candidate	Votes	%	±%
Labor	Reg Hurst	16,430	78.1	−21.9
Democratic Labor	Charles Coffey	2,747	13.1	+13.1
Social Credit	George Heritage	1,821	8.7	+8.7
Total formal votes		21,028	94.9	
Informal votes		1,116	5.1	
Turnout		22,144	95.5	
Two-candidate-preferred result
Labor	Reg Hurst	17,341	82.5	−17.5
Democratic Labor	Charles Coffey	3,687	17.5	+17.5
Labor hold		Swing	N/A	

=== Stirling ===
1965 South Australian state election: Stirling
Party	Candidate	Votes	%	±%
Liberal and Country	William McAnaney	4,906	70.9	+4.7
Labor	Allan Stevens	2,011	29.1	+29.1
Total formal votes		6,917	99.0	+0.5
Informal votes		102	1.5	−0.5
Turnout		6,989	96.5	+0.4
Liberal and Country hold		Swing	N/A	

=== Stuart ===
1965 South Australian state election: Stuart
Party	Candidate	Votes	%	±%
Labor	Lindsay Riches	6,618	87.7	−0.3
Independent	William Young	926	12.3	+12.3
Total formal votes		7,544	95.7	−0.7
Informal votes		336	4.3	+0.7
Turnout		7,880	93.1	−0.2
Labor hold		Swing	−0.3	

=== Torrens ===
1965 South Australian state election: Torrens
Party	Candidate	Votes	%	±%
Liberal and Country	John Coumbe	8,937	48.5	−1.3
Labor	Chris Hurford	8,063	43.7	−1.6
Democratic Labor	Charles Bradley	1,136	6.2	+1.4
Social Credit	Russell Sellars	310	1.7	+1.7
Total formal votes		18,446	97.9	−0.5
Informal votes		397	2.1	+0.5
Turnout		18,843	94.2	+0.2
Two-party-preferred result
Liberal and Country	John Coumbe	9,982	54.1	+0.2
Labor	Chris Hurford	8,464	45.9	−0.2
Liberal and Country hold		Swing	+0.2	

=== Unley ===
1965 South Australian state election: Unley
Party	Candidate	Votes	%	±%
Labor	Gil Langley	9,062	50.7	+0.2
Liberal and Country	John McLeay	8,024	44.9	+1.7
Democratic Labor	Mary Dempsey	660	3.7	+3.7
Independent	John Hennessey	79	0.4	+0.4
Independent	William Wallace	56	0.3	+0.3
Total formal votes		17,881	97.6	+4.9
Informal votes		455	2.4	−4.9
Turnout		18,336	94.0	+1.3
Two-party-preferred result
Labor	Gil Langley	9,229	51.6	−2.0
Liberal and Country	John McLeay	8,652	48.4	+2.0
Labor hold		Swing	−2.0	

=== Victoria ===
1965 South Australian state election: Victoria
Party	Candidate	Votes	%	±%
Liberal and Country	Allan Rodda	3,511	51.1	−2.6
Labor	David Walker	2,713	39.5	−6.8
National	James McLachlan	421	6.1	+6.1
Independent	John Gartner	221	3.2	+3.2
Total formal votes		6,866	99.1	+0.1
Informal votes		59	0.9	−0.1
Turnout		6,925	95.2	+0.1
Two-party-preferred result
Liberal and Country	Allan Rodda	4,001	58.3	+4.6
Labor	David Walker	2,865	41.7	−4.6
Liberal and Country hold		Swing	+4.6	

=== Wallaroo ===
1965 South Australian state election: Wallaroo
Party	Candidate	Votes	%	±%
Labor	Lloyd Hughes	3,346	59.1	−3.8
Liberal and Country	Clarence Green	2,313	40.9	+3.8
Total formal votes		5,659	98.1	−0.7
Informal votes		112	1.9	+0.7
Turnout		5,771	96.5	−0.1
Labor hold		Swing	−3.8	

=== West Torrens ===
1965 South Australian state election: West Torrens
Party	Candidate	Votes	%	±%
Labor	Glen Broomhill	18,496	56.8	−0.7
Liberal and Country	Parker Morton	14,068	43.2	+4.8
Total formal votes		32,564	97.3	−1.3
Informal votes		899	2.7	+1.3
Turnout		33,463	94.1	+0.3
Labor hold		Swing	−1.3	

=== Whyalla ===
1965 South Australian state election: Whyalla
Party	Candidate	Votes	%	±%
Labor	Ron Loveday	7,589	79.8	−7.5
Democratic Labor	Gordon Kimpton	1,043	11.0	+11.0
Independent	Clarence Young	544	5.7	+5.7
Independent	James Yates	332	3.5	+3.5
Total formal votes		9,508	96.4	−0.5
Informal votes		348	3.6	+0.5
Turnout		9,856	87.6	−1.0
Two-candidate-preferred result
Labor	Ron Loveday	8,027	84.4	−2.9
Democratic Labor	Gordon Kimpton	1,481	15.6	+15.6
Labor hold		Swing	N/A	

=== Yorke Peninsula ===
1965 South Australian state election: Yorke Peninsula
Party	Candidate	Votes	%	±%
Liberal and Country	James Ferguson	4,276	69.5	−30.5
Labor	Michael Kennedy	1,875	30.5	+30.5
Total formal votes		6,151	98.2	
Informal votes		111	1.8	
Turnout		6,262	97.5	
Liberal and Country hold		Swing	N/A	

== See also ==
- Members of the South Australian House of Assembly, 1965–1968
- Candidates of the 1965 South Australian state election
