= Electoral results for the district of Stirling (South Australia) =

South Australian district election results

This is a list of election results for the electoral district of Stirling in South Australian elections.

== Members for Stirling ==
Member	Party	Term
Herbert Dunn	Independent	1938–1940
Herbert Dunn	Liberal and Country	1940–1952
William Jenkins	Liberal and Country	1952–1963
William McAnaney	Liberal and Country	1963–1970

== Election results ==
=== Elections in the 1960s ===
1968 South Australian state election: Stirling
Party	Candidate	Votes	%	±%
Liberal and Country	William McAnaney	5,124	72.0	+1.1
Labor	Glenton Gregory	1,989	28.0	−1.1
Total formal votes		7,113	98.3	−0.7
Informal votes		122	1.7	+0.7
Turnout		7,235	96.3	−0.2
Liberal and Country hold		Swing	+1.1	

1965 South Australian state election: Stirling
Party	Candidate	Votes	%	±%
Liberal and Country	William McAnaney	4,906	70.9	+4.7
Labor	Allan Stevens	2,011	29.1	+29.1
Total formal votes		6,917	99.0	+0.5
Informal votes		102	1.5	−0.5
Turnout		6,989	96.5	+0.4
Liberal and Country hold		Swing	N/A	

1962 South Australian state election: Stirling
Party	Candidate	Votes	%	±%
Liberal and Country	William Jenkins	4,497	66.2	−33.8
Independent	Clifford Thorpe	2,293	33.8	+33.8
Total formal votes		6,790	98.5	
Informal votes		102	1.5	
Turnout		6,892	96.1	
Liberal and Country hold		Swing	N/A	

=== Elections in the 1950s ===
1959 South Australian state election: Stirling
Party	Candidate	Votes	%	±%
Liberal and Country	William Jenkins	unopposed		
Liberal and Country hold		Swing		

1956 South Australian state election: Stirling
Party	Candidate	Votes	%	±%
Liberal and Country	William Jenkins	unopposed		
Liberal and Country hold		Swing		

1953 South Australian state election: Stirling
Party	Candidate	Votes	%	±%
Liberal and Country	William Jenkins	3,507	52.9	−3.7
Independent	William McAnaney	2,141	32.3	32.3
Independent	Orlando Hutchinson	985	14.8	+14.8
Total formal votes		6,633	97.6	−0.7
Informal votes		161	2.4	+0.7
Turnout		6,794	97.0	+1.8
Liberal and Country hold		Swing	N/A	

- Preferences were not distributed.

1950 South Australian state election: Stirling
Party	Candidate	Votes	%	±%
Liberal and Country	Herbert Dunn	3,711	56.6	−43.4
Independent	William Jenkins	2,844	43.4	+43.4
Total formal votes		6,555	98.3	
Informal votes		115	1.7	
Turnout		6,670	95.2	
Liberal and Country hold		Swing	N/A	

=== Elections in the 1940s ===
1947 South Australian state election: Stirling
Party	Candidate	Votes	%	±%
Liberal and Country	Herbert Dunn	unopposed		
Liberal and Country hold		Swing		

1944 South Australian state election: Stirling
Party	Candidate	Votes	%	±%
Liberal and Country	Herbert Dunn	2,996	54.2	+25.2
Labor	J McTier	1,284	23.2	+23.2
Independent	S D Bruce	1,248	22.6	+22.6
Total formal votes		5,528	97.4	−1.3
Informal votes		148	2.6	+1.3
Turnout		5,676	91.1	+33.5
Liberal and Country gain from Independent		Swing	N/A	

- Sitting MP for Stirling, Herbert Dunn had been elected as an independent in the previous election, but joined the LCL before this election.

1941 South Australian state election: Stirling
Party	Candidate	Votes	%	±%
Independent	Herbert Dunn	1,306	35.9	−1.1
Liberal and Country	Alick Fuller	1,057	29.0	+0.9
Independent	Frederick Keen	1,040	28.6	+28.6
Independent	Lindsay Yelland	240	6.6	+6.6
Total formal votes		3,643	98.7	0.0
Informal votes		47	1.3	0.0
Turnout		3,690	57.6	−10.6
Two-candidate-preferred result
Independent	Herbert Dunn	2,113	58.0	+2.3
Independent	Frederick Keen	1,530	42.0	+42.0
Independent hold		Swing	N/A	

=== Elections in the 1930s ===
1938 South Australian state election: Stirling
Party	Candidate	Votes	%	±%
Independent	Samuel Pearce	1,597	37.0	
Independent	Herbert Dunn	1,503	34.8	
Liberal and Country	Percy Heggaton	1,214	28.1	
Total formal votes		4,314	98.7	
Informal votes		58	1.3	
Turnout		4,372	68.2	
Two-candidate-preferred result
Independent	Herbert Dunn	2,401	55.7	
Independent	Samuel Pearce	1,913	44.3	
Independent gain from Liberal and Country		Swing		
