= Ernie Crimes =

Australian politician (1907–2008)

Ernest Henry Crimes (27 May 1907 – 17 January 2008) was an Australian politician who represented the South Australian House of Assembly seat of Spence from 1970 to 1975 for the Labor Party.

Crimes was an unsuccessful Labor candidate for the safe LCL seat of Gumeracha, Sir Thomas Playford's seat, at the 1959 and 1965 elections.

Parliament of South Australia
New seat	Member for Spence; 1970–1975	Succeeded by Roy Abbott
