= 1965 South Australian state election =

- 6 March 1965

All 39 seats in the South Australian House of Assembly 20 seats were needed for a majority
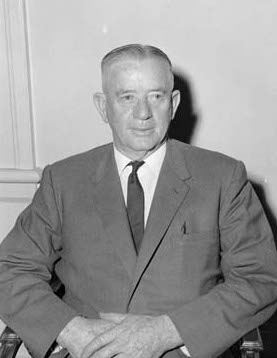

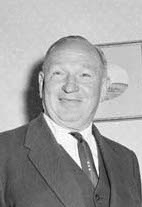
	First party	Second party
Leader	Frank Walsh	Thomas Playford
Party	Labor	Liberal and Country
Leader since	22 September 1960	5 November 1938
Leader's seat	Edwardstown	Gumeracha
Last election	19 seats	18 seats
Seats won	21 seats	17 seats
Seat change	▲2	▼1
Percentage	54.3%	45.7%
Swing	0.0	0.0
- A map of South Australian electorates from 1955 to 1969, during the height of the Playmander.
Premier before election
Thomas Playford
Liberal and Country
Elected Premier
Frank Walsh
Labor

State elections were held in South Australia on 6 March 1965. All 39 seats in the South Australian House of Assembly were up for election. The incumbent Liberal and Country League led by Premier of South Australia Thomas Playford IV, in power since 1938, was defeated by the Australian Labor Party led by Leader of the Opposition Frank Walsh.

== Background ==
Even though Labor won the 1944, 1953 and 1962 elections on the two-party vote against Thomas Playford IV and the Liberal and Country League (LCL), the electoral rural overweighting known as the Playmander since 1936 locked them out of power due to 26 rural districts enjoying a 2-to-1 advantage over the 13 Adelaide-based districts. Labor's statewide two-party at the 1965 election remained unchanged at 54.3 percent, which would have been enough for a strong majority government in most of the rest of Australia. However, due to the rural overweighting, Labor scraped into office by just two seats, the only time it won government during the Playmander. Labor won the seats of metropolitan Glenelg and rural Barossa at the 1965 election, after winning the seats of rural Chaffey and metropolitan Unley at the 1962 election.

At the 1968 election, Labor still won a 53.2 percent two-party vote, however the LCL won the seats of rural Murray and rural Chaffee, forming a one-seat minority government with independent Tom Stott. If just 21 LCL votes were Labor votes in Murray in 1968, Labor would have retained a one-seat majority. The LCL won only three metropolitan seats in 1965 and 1968 – Burnside, Mitcham and marginally Torrens. The most populous metropolitan seats (13) had as much as 5-10 times the number of voters than the least populous rural seats (26), despite two thirds of the population located in the metropolitan area − in 1968, the rural seat of Frome had 4,500 formal votes, while the metropolitan seat of Enfield had 42,000 formal votes.

The 1965 election saw the Australian Labor Party in government for the first time since 1933. Frank Walsh, who had been Leader of the Opposition since 1960, became Premier. Despite the fact that Labor won a still-record 55 percent primary vote (on seats contested) and a landslide 54.3 percent two-party vote (state wide estimate), the Labor government only held a thin two-seat majority. The two-party vote was unchanged from the previous election where the LCL retained government, but a change of government occurred at this election due to the efficacy of Labor choosing to campaign near solely in marginal LCL seats.

Walsh’s term as Premier was marked by increased spending on public education and the implementation of far-reaching social welfare and Aboriginal Affairs legislation, although many of these changes were spearheaded by the socially liberal Don Dunstan, and the socially conservative Walsh may well have personally opposed some of these moves.

Walsh was never comfortable dealing with the media, particularly television, and his ascension to the job of Premier only exacerbated these problems. A master of malapropisms, Walsh regularly had journalists, Hansard reporters, and political ally and foe alike bewildered by his statements. To give but one example, Walsh once said in parliament "In this manner, Mr Speaker, the government has acted as if this were a diseased estate. It's not sufficiently elasticated... The government is suffering from a complete lack of apathy in the case." His unease with the media was seen in stark contrast to Dunstan, his Attorney-General, who would prove to be a media relations master throughout his later terms as Premier.

Walsh's awkwardness with the media was further highlighted after 1966, when Playford retired as Opposition Leader and was succeeded by 37-year-old Steele Hall. Hall was not only younger, but considerably more socially liberal than Playford. A sagging economy and poor polling figures combined with Hall's advent to convince local Labor heavyweights that Labor could not win the next election with Walsh as Premier. Things came to a head in early 1967, when South Australian Labor power-broker Clyde Cameron publicly thanked Walsh for making the noble decision to retire to make way for a younger person. This was news to Walsh, who had made no such decision. After initially digging in his heels, Walsh eventually announced his retirement two weeks later, but not before attempting (without success) to manoeuvre his protégé Des Corcoran into the Premiership ahead of Dunstan.

For the first time, since 1910 to 1912, there were no by-elections necessary during the term of the parliament.

Dunstan led Labor into the 1968 election. Although Labor won 53.2 percent of the two-party vote, it lost two seats, resulting in a hung parliament with 19 seats for both parties. Lone crossbench independent MP Tom Stott held the balance of power, and announced confidence and supply support for an LCL minority government, installing Hall as premier even though the LCL had only won 46.8 percent of the two-party vote. Stott became Speaker of the South Australian House of Assembly. Dunstan spearheaded a public outcry which led Hall to finally scrap the Playmander soon after taking office.

== Results ==
Arrangement of the House of Assembly after the 1965 state election.

South Australian state election, 6 March 1965 House of Assembly << 1962–1968 >>
Enrolled voters	562,824				
Votes cast	513,064		Turnout	94.59%	+0.61%
Informal votes	14,424		Informal	2.81%	+0.35%
Summary of votes by party
Party	Primary votes	%	Swing	Seats	Change
Labor	274,432	55.04%	+1.06%	21	+ 2
Liberal and Country	179,183	35.93%	+1.43%	17	– 1
Democratic Labor	21,679	4.35%	–3.40%	0	± 0
Social Credit	9,553	1.92%	+1.92%	0	± 0
National	2,227	0.45%	+0.45%	0	± 0
Communist	2,214	0.44%	–0.18%	0	± 0
Independent	9,352	1.88%	–1.27%	1	– 1
Total	498,640			39	
Two-party-preferred
Labor		54.30%	0.00%		
Liberal and Country		45.70%	0.00%		

- The primary vote figures were from contested seats, while the state-wide two-party-preferred vote figures were estimated from all seats.

== Post-election pendulum ==
Labor seats (21)
Marginal
Chaffey	Reg Curren	ALP	0.7%
Unley	Gil Langley	ALP	1.6%
Glenelg	Hugh Hudson	ALP	2.1%
Barossa	Molly Byrne	ALP	2.3%
Fairly safe
West Torrens	Glen Broomhill	ALP	6.8%
Norwood	Don Dunstan	ALP	7.6%
Frome	Tom Casey	ALP	8.3%
Wallaroo	Lloyd Hughes	ALP	9.1%
Safe
Mount Gambier	Allan Burdon	ALP	10.6%
Edwardstown	Frank Walsh	ALP	11.8%
Millicent	Des Corcoran	ALP	11.8%
Enfield	Jack Jennings	ALP	17.0%
Murray	Gabe Bywaters	ALP	17.1%
Gawler	John Clark	ALP	19.7%
Adelaide	Sam Lawn	ALP	28.2% v DLP
Hindmarsh	Cyril Hutchens	ALP	30.1% v DLP
Port Adelaide	John Ryan	ALP	30.6% v DLP
Semaphore	Reg Hurst	ALP	32.5% v DLP
Whyalla	Ron Loveday	ALP	34.4% v DLP
Stuart	Lindsay Riches	ALP	37.7% v IND
Port Pirie	Dave McKee	ALP	39.4% v IND

LCL seats (17)
Marginal
Torrens	John Coumbe	LCL	4.1%
Fairly safe
Alexandra	David Brookman	LCL	7.7%
Victoria	Allan Rodda	LCL	8.3%
Onkaparinga	Howard Shannon	LCL	9.1%
Flinders	Glen Pearson	LCL	9.9%
Safe
Eyre	George Bockelberg	LCL	10.2%
Burnside	Joyce Steele	LCL	12.2%
Burra	Percy Quirke	LCL	12.3%
Gouger	Steele Hall	LCL	13.5%
Mitcham	Robin Millhouse	LCL	16.6%
Rocky River	James Heaslip	LCL	16.6%
Yorke Peninsula	James Ferguson	LCL	19.5%
Stirling	William McAnaney	LCL	20.9%
Gumeracha	Thomas Playford	LCL	23.1%
Albert	Bill Nankivell	LCL	unopposed
Angas	Berthold Teusner	LCL	unopposed
Light	John Freebairn	LCL	unopposed
Crossbench seats (1)
Ridley	Tom Stott	IND	16.9% v ALP

== Results prior to 1965 ==
Lower house percentage and seat results
% (seats)	ALP	LCL	IND	OTH	ALP 2PP	LCL 2PP
1965	55.04% (21)	35.93% (17)	1.88% (1)	7.16%	54.3%	45.7%
1962	53.98% (19)	34.51% (18)	3.15% (2)	8.37%	54.3%	45.7%
1959	49.35% (17)	36.95% (20)	5.93% (2)	7.77%	49.7%	50.3%
1956	47.37% (15)	36.69% (21)	7.34% (3)	8.60%	48.7%	51.3%
1953	50.84% (14)	36.45% (21)	11.10% (4)	1.60%	53.0%	47.0%
1950	48.09% (12)	40.51% (23)	10.07% (4)	1.34%	48.7%	51.3%
1947	48.64% (13)	40.38% (23)	6.20% (3)	4.77%	48.0%	52.0%
1944	42.52% (16)	45.84% (20)	6.64% (3)	5.00%	53.3%	46.7%
1941	33.25% (11)	37.55% (20)	29.20% (8)	0.00%
1938	26.16% (9)	33.44% (15)	39.73% (14)	0.66% (1)
1933	27.78% (6)	34.62% (29)	13.41% (3)	24.20% (8)
Primary source: WA Uni – TPP sources: ABC and Professional Historians

Rural overweighting known as the Playmander resulted in LCL lower house minority and majority governments for decades. Upper house elections since 1941 have held 16 LCL and 4 ALP; voting rights were limited to the wealthier classes; suffrage was dependent on certain property and wage requirements. The electoral districts were drawn to favour regional areas with a 2:1 bias in place.

In the 2006 election, metro Adelaide held 35 metro districts representing 1.1 million people, with 12 rural districts representing 0.4 million people. In the 1965 election, 13 metro districts represented 0.7 million people and 26 rural districts represented 0.4 million people.

== Legislative Council results ==
1965 Legislative Council result
Party		Seats
Australian Labor Party	50.6%	2
Liberal and Country League	42.2%	8
Independents/Other	7.2%	
1965-1968 Legislative Council
Party		Seats
Liberal and Country League		16
Australian Labor Party		4

== See also ==
- Results of the South Australian state election, 1965 (House of Assembly)
- Candidates of the 1965 South Australian state election
- Members of the South Australian House of Assembly, 1965-1968
- Members of the South Australian Legislative Council, 1965-1968
- Playmander
