= 1956 Barker by-election =

A by-election was held for the Australian House of Representatives seat of Barker on 13 October 1956. This was triggered by the death of Liberal MP and Speaker Archie Cameron.

The by-election was won by Liberal candidate Jim Forbes. William McAnaney, a future state Liberal MP, who had been chairman of the District Council of Strathalbyn, unsuccessfully contested the by-election as an independent.

== Results ==
Barker by-election, 1956
Party	Candidate	Votes	%	±%
Liberal	Jim Forbes	18,471	48.7	−19.0
Labor	Ralph Dettman	14,454	38.1	+5.8
Independent Liberal	William McAnaney	2,819	7.4	+7.4
Labor (A-C)	Brian Crowe	2,207	5.8	+5.8
Total formal votes		37,951	98.0	
Informal votes		771	2.0	
Turnout		38,722	92.6	
Two-party-preferred result
Liberal	Jim Forbes	21,935	57.8	−9.9
Labor	Ralph Dettman	16,016	42.2	+9.9
Liberal hold		Swing	−9.9	
