= 1962 South Australian state election =

- 3 March 1962

All 39 seats in the South Australian House of Assembly 20 seats needed for a majority
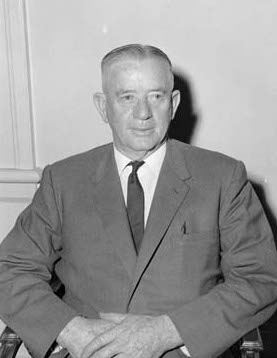

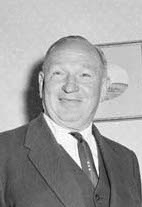
| | First party | Second party |
|---|---|---|
| Leader | Frank Walsh | Thomas Playford |
| Party | Labor | Liberal and Country |
| Leader since | 22 September 1960 | 5 November 1938 |
| Leader's seat | Edwardstown | Gumeracha |
| Last election | 17 seats | 20 seats |
| Seats won | 19 | 18 |
| Seat change | ▲2 | ▼2 |
| Primary vote | 219,790 | 140,507 |
| Percentage | 53.98% | 34.51% |
| Swing | ▲4.63 | ▼2.44 |
| TPP | 54.30% | 45.70% |
| TPP swing | ▲4.60 | ▼4.60 |
- A map of South Australian electorates from 1955 to 1969, during the height of the Playmander
Premier before election
Thomas Playford
Liberal and Country
Subsequent Premier
Thomas Playford
Liberal and Country

State elections were held in South Australia on 3 March 1962. All 39 seats in the South Australian House of Assembly were up for election. The incumbent Liberal and Country League led by Premier of South Australia Thomas Playford IV defeated the Australian Labor Party led by Leader of the Opposition Frank Walsh.

This was the first and only time that a South Australian Government won a tenth consecutive term in office.

== Background ==
The Playford government, which had been in power since 1938, went into the 1962 elections in a precarious position. At the time the writs were issued, South Australia was dogged by a massive recession. This led observers to think that Labor would finally have a chance at power; longtime opposition leader Mick O'Halloran had died suddenly in 1960, and Labor was led into the election by former deputy leader Frank Walsh.

The Labor opposition won in excess of 54 percent of the statewide two-party-preferred vote, however the LCL retained government with the assistance of the Playmander − an electoral malapportionment in which there were two country seats for every one seat in Adelaide. This system resulted in Labor being denied government in 1944, 1953 and 1968, despite winning clear statewide two-party majorities.

While O'Halloran had despaired of ever becoming Premier, Walsh made a concerted effort to end the LCL's three-decade grip on government. Knowing that the Playmander made a statewide campaign pointless, Walsh instead decided to target marginal LCL seats.

In the election, Labor won the two-party vote with 54.3% to 45.7%, for a 4.6% swing to Labor, a result that in all other states would have seen Labor oust Playford's LCL in a landslide. However, due to the Playmander, the election resulted in a hung parliament: Labor won 19 seats, one seat short of a majority, while the LCL won 18 seats, two seats short of a majority, with crossbench independent MPs, Tom Stott and Percy Quirke, holding the balance of power.

Even with this to consider, speculation was rampant on election night that Playford's 23-year tenure was finally over: Labor flipped the seats of Chaffey and Unley (and later did so with Glenelg and Barossa at the 1965 election). The LCL won only four metropolitan seats: Burnside, Glenelg, Mitcham and Torrens.

However, despite not winning a plurality, Playford declined to concede defeat, saying he would wait to see how the chamber lined up once the Parliament reassembled.

Both Stott and Quirke later announced confidence and supply support for an LCL minority government with a bare one-seat parliamentary majority. Stott became Speaker of the South Australian House of Assembly following the election, while Quirke joined the LCL and entered the ministry in 1963.

During these negotiations, Walsh spoke directly with Governor Edric Bastyan and lobbied him not to reappoint Playford, pointing to the overwhelming result in Labor's favour, but to no avail.

The furore over the 1962 election result illustrated how distorted the Playmander had become; by this time, some two-thirds of the state's population resided in Adelaide and its suburbs, but they only elected one-third of the members of the Parliament. On paper, this meant a rural vote was worth at least double a vote in Adelaide; in one of the more extreme cases, the rural seat of Frome had 4,500 formal votes in 1968, while at the same election the metropolitan seat of Enfield had 42,000 formal votes, for a ratio of 9.3:1.

== Results ==
Arrangement of the House of Assembly after the 1962 state election.

South Australian state election, 3 March 1962 House of Assembly << 1959–1965 >>
| Enrolled voters | 531,228 | | | | |
| Votes cast | 417,461 | | Turnout | 93.98% | +0.03% |
| Informal votes | 10,267 | | Informal | 2.46% | -0.43% |
Summary of votes by party
| Party | Primary votes | % | Swing | Seats | Change |
| Labor | 219,790 | 53.98% | +4.63% | 19 | + 2 |
| Liberal and Country | 140,507 | 34.51% | –2.44% | 18 | – 2 |
| Democratic Labor | 31,543 | 7.75% | +2.09% | 0 | ± 0 |
| Communist | 2,528 | 0.62% | –0.80% | 0 | ± 0 |
| Independent | 12,827 | 3.15% | –2.78% | 2 | ± 0 |
| Total | 407,195 | | | 39 | |
Two-party-preferred
| Liberal and Country | | 45.70% | –4.60% | | |
| Labor | | 54.30% | +4.60% | | |

- The primary vote figures were from contested seats, while the state-wide two-party-preferred vote figures were estimated from all seats.

== Post-election pendulum ==
Government seats (20)
Marginal
| Glenelg | Baden Pattinson | LCL | 3.3% |
| Flinders | Glen Pearson | LCL | 3.5% |
| Victoria | Leslie Harding | LCL | 3.7% |
| Torrens | John Coumbe | LCL | 3.9% |
Fairly safe
| Onkaparinga | Howard Shannon | LCL | 6.4% |
| Burra | Percy Quirke | IND | 6.5% v LCL |
| Ridley | Tom Stott | IND | 7.3% v LCL |
Safe
| Light | John Freebairn | LCL | 10.9% |
| Alexandra | David Brookman | LCL | 13.5% |
| Burnside | Joyce Steele | LCL | 14.2% |
| Stirling | William Jenkins | LCL | 16.2% v IND |
| Mitcham | Robin Millhouse | LCL | 18.8% |
| Gumeracha | Thomas Playford | LCL | 31.1% v DLP |
| Barossa | Condor Laucke | LCL | 35.9% v COM |
| Albert | Bill Nankivell | LCL | unopposed |
| Angas | Berthold Teusner | LCL | unopposed |
| Eyre | George Bockelberg | LCL | unopposed |
| Gouger | Steele Hall | LCL | unopposed |
| Rocky River | James Heaslip | LCL | unopposed |
| Yorke Peninsula | Cecil Hincks | LCL | unopposed |

Opposition seats (19)
Marginal
| Chaffey | Reg Curren | ALP | 0.1% |
| Millicent | Des Corcoran | ALP | 3.3% |
| Unley | Gil Langley | ALP | 3.6% |
Fairly safe
| Frome | Tom Casey | ALP | 6.2% |
| West Torrens | Fred Walsh | ALP | 8.1% |
| Norwood | Don Dunstan | ALP | 8.8% |
Safe
| Wallaroo | Lloyd Hughes | ALP | 12.9% |
| Gawler | John Clark | ALP | 16.9% |
| Mount Gambier | Ron Ralston | ALP | 18.7% |
| Murray | Gabe Bywaters | ALP | 20.6% |
| Edwardstown | Frank Walsh | ALP | 21.6% v DLP |
| Enfield | Joe Jennings | ALP | 27.7% v DLP |
| Adelaide | Sam Lawn | ALP | 30.3% v DLP |
| Port Adelaide | John Ryan | ALP | 36.0% v DLP |
| Whyalla | Ron Loveday | ALP | 37.3% v IND |
| Stuart | Lindsay Riches | ALP | 38.0% v IND |
| Port Pirie | Dave McKee | ALP | 40.8% v IND |
| Hindmarsh | Cyril Hutchens | ALP | unopposed |
| Semaphore | Harold Tapping | ALP | unopposed |

== See also ==
- Results of the South Australian state election, 1962 (House of Assembly)
- Candidates of the 1962 South Australian state election
- Members of the South Australian House of Assembly, 1962-1965
- Members of the South Australian Legislative Council, 1962-1965
- Playmander
