= Herbert Dunn (politician) =

Australian politician

Herbert Charles Dunn

Personal details
- Born: 6 March 1883; Woodchester, South Australia
- Died: 11 September 1952 (aged 69)
- Parent(s): Charles Henry Dunn and Hannah Jane Dunn (nee Maidment)

Herbert Charles Dunn (6 March 1883 – 11 September 1952) was an Australian politician who represented the South Australian House of Assembly seat of Stirling from 1938 to 1952. He was an independent until 1940 when he joined the Liberal and Country League.

Dunn was born at Woodchester and attended the Woodchester and Strathalbyn public schools. He was a farmer in the Finniss district before entering politics, later retiring to Strathalbyn. He was a District Council of Strathalbyn councillor and its chairman for over a decade prior to his election to parliament, was a Justice of the Peace, and served on the committee of the Strathalbyn Agricultural Society.

He was elected to the House of Assembly as an independent at the 1938 election, defeating long serving Liberal and Country League MP Percy Heggaton. He was one of 14 out of 39 lower house independent MPs at that election, which as a grouping won 40 percent of the primary vote, more than either of the major parties. Dunn supported the conservative Liberal and Country League government of Richard Layton Butler and Tom Playford as an independent, and in 1940 he joined the party. He was defeated for LCL preselection for the 1941 election, but won easily as an unendorsed candidate, and remained with the party; subsequently being re-elected under that banner three more times.

In August 1952, Dunn was defeated for Liberal and Country League preselection by William Jenkins for the 1953 election and announced his intention to run as an unendorsed candidate. However, after being ill for some time, he died in office on 11 September that year, and was buried at Strathalbyn.

Parliament of South Australia
| Preceded by New electorate | Member for Stirling; 1938–1952 | Succeeded by William Jenkins |
