= William Randell =

Australian politician (1824–1911)

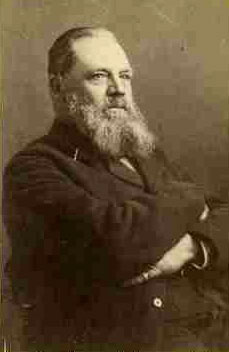
- Born: 2 May 1824; Sidbury
- Died: 4 March 1911; North Adelaide
- Occupations: Politician, ship-owner, miller

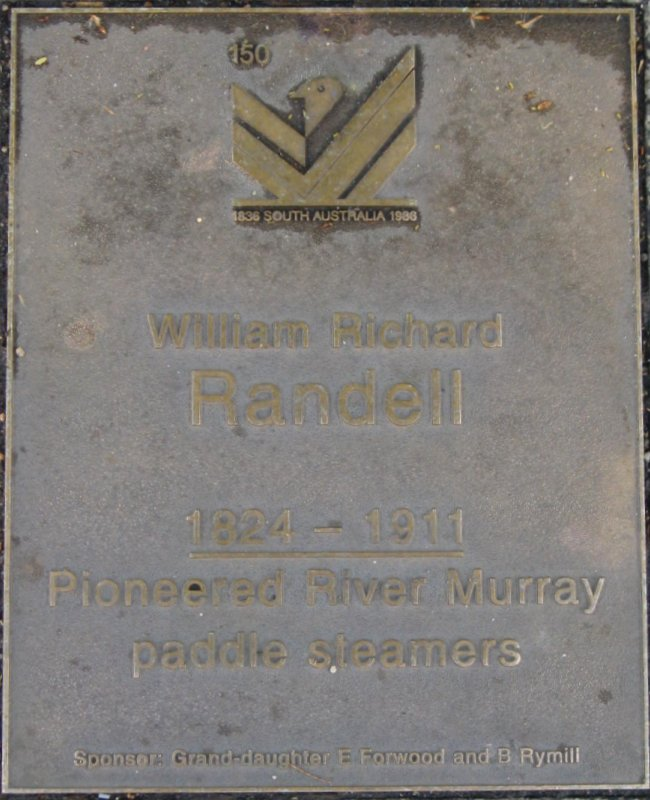
Jubilee 150 Walkway plaque commemorating William Richard Randell

William Richard Randell "Captain Randell" (2 May 1824 – 4 March 1911), was an Australian politician and pioneer born in Devon, England, who emigrated to the newly founded colony of South Australia in 1837 with his family. He was a pioneer of the riverboat industry on the River Murray and represented the Electoral district of Gumeracha in the South Australian House of Assembly from 1893 to 1899.

Captain Randell can also refer to his son (Richard) Murray Randell (2 February 1863 – 6 March 1952), who took over management of his father's small fleet of River Murray paddle steamers.

== Early years ==
Born the eldest son of William Beavis Randell (1799–1876), a miller of Sidbury, Devon, and Mary Ann Elliott Randell (née Beare) (1799 – 22 December 1874), William was educated in Exeter. The family emigrated to Adelaide in 1837 on the "Hartley", probably on the recommendation of family friend George Fife Angas, arriving at Holdfast Bay on 20 October 1837. His father was appointed as Stock Manager for the South Australian Company, and was to have overseen erection and operation of its steam-driven flour mill, but though the mill machinery and building materials arrived shortly after the "Hartley", it was stranded on Kangaroo Island and did not arrive on the mainland for some time. The family first lived in a large tent rented from Robert Gouger then in 1839 moved into "Park Cottage" of 11 rooms on the banks of the Torrens, (demolished c. 1970) on section 256, the site of the present Adelaide Caravan Park. The mill (1842–1872) was built where Hackney Hotel is now. In 1840 W. B. Randell purchased 566 acres as a Special Survey, then another tranche, totalling 966 acres which he called "Kenton Park" (probably named for Kenton, Devon). He completed a home in 1844, and "Kenton Mill" which commenced operation in 1848, with William Richard Randell its first manager. In 1852 he laid out the town of Gumeracha above the flood level of Kenton Creek.

=== Family of W. B. Randell ===
William Beavis Randell (originally "Randle") married Mary Ann Elliott Beare (or Bear) (1799–1874) on 17 April 1823. They had 9 children:

- William Richard Randell (1824–1911) was a trader on the Murray (subject of this article).
- Thomas George Randell (c. 1826 – 14 May 1880) married Mary Smith (c. 1828 – 16 April 1870) on ??

- Eldest daughter Mary Evelyn Randell (c. 1852 – 29 October 1927) married Charles Claus "Charlie" Bock (c. 1843 – 4 December 1919) on 10 February 1875. He was captain of several Murray River steamers.

- Hannah Elliott Randell (1827–1930) married Alfred Swaine
- John Beavis Randell J.P. (1829 – 24 March 1876), flour miller, married Anne "Annie" Cave ( – 5 August 1900).
- Elliott Charles Randell (c. 1832 – 18 April 1908) of Echuca was owner and captain of various Murray steamers.

- Alfred Elliot Randell (c. 1856 – 21 January 1892) skippered various Murray steamers. He married Katherine W. Swaine on 25 January 1890. Their daughter was born three weeks after he died.

- Samuel Randell (c. 1833 – 30 November 1901) married Elizabeth Porter (c. 1830 – 23 January 1892), employed by Waterworks Office. His stepson William Robert Porter (c. 1850 – 19 November 1921) was River Murray steamboat captain.
- Francis Henry Randell (c. 1835 – 25 December 1899) was a squatter of Tarcoon, near the river Darling. He married Sarah Ann Nickels on 7 March 1861.
- Ebenezer Hartly Randell (March 1838 – 6 September 1890) owner and captain of various Murray steamers. He married Ada Caroline Farmer on 25 December 1867
- Elizabeth Beavis Randell (1840–1855) died of smallpox

== The "Mary Ann" ==
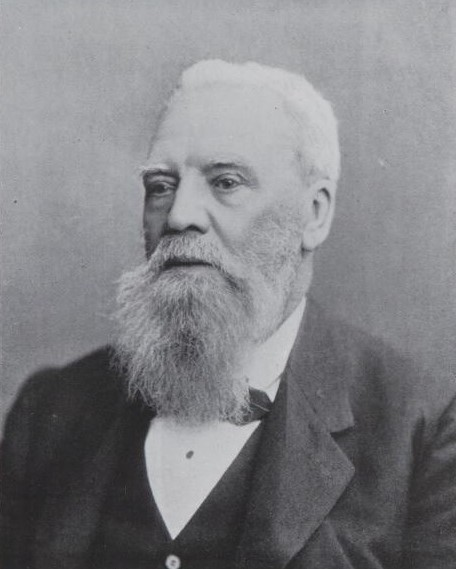

As well as his mill management duties, William Randell assisted his father and brothers with their vast property which stretched from present-day Gumeracha to the river Murray. His duties often involved droving cattle to the banks of the lower Murray, and dreamt of steam-boats being able to transport produce between South Australia and the neighbouring colony of Victoria. At the time South Australia was struggling to retain its population due to emigration to the Victorian goldfields.

In 1852, with no experience in the steamboat construction, Randell commissioned local carpenters to build the frame of a 55-foot-long (17 m), 9-foot beam (2.7 m) paddlewheel boat of shallow draught, capacity 20 ton in Gumeracha. It was dismantled, taken by bullock cart across the plains to Reedy Creek Station and the Noa No landing about 2 miles north of the present Mannum. There it was rebuilt, clad in local redgum. Named the Mary Ann, after his mother, the steamer featured a 10-inch bore (250 mm) cylinder beam-engine delivering 8 horsepower, made by a German engineer from Adelaide, Carl Gehlkin. The boiler was an unsatisfactory rectangular affair built by the Randells' blacksmith. Its first trip, of 24 miles, was made on 19 February 1853. On 4 March she arrived at Goolwa for her first official voyage and received in grand style by the lieutenant-governor Sir Henry Young and hundreds of others. He set off on the return trip that afternoon. On 25 March 1853 he had navigated to Penn's Reach, a few miles north of Morgan, when low water levels forced him to return. The following year he reached Swan Hill, 1,000 miles (1,600 km) from the sea at Goolwa. Later that year Captain Cadell won the government's £2000 prize for the first practicable cargo boat Lady Augusta (The £2,000 was soon raised to £4,000 on Cadell's agreement to build another boat. By the terms of the contest, the "Mary Ann" was never a contender for the prize.)

The Mary Ann was later rebuilt as one half of a two-hulled vessel named Gemini.

== Expansion ==
Randell abandoned Noa No as too subject to flooding and built a small "pug and pine" cottage, the start of the town of Mannum, and a dry-dock.

His second boat, the twin-hulled single paddle-wheel "Gemini", despite its small size and ungainly appearance, managed some feats of navigation into New South Wales. She reached Lang's Crossing (where Hay stands now), then Brewarrina in 1859, and on another occasion as far as Walgett.

Randell built (or commissioned) many more steamers: "Bogan", "Bunyip" (destroyed by fire in 1863, along with its barges), "Ariel", "Nil Desperandum", "Corowa", "Waragery", "Tyro", and "Ruby". Wentworth, New South Wales was Randell's base for two decades until the 1870s, as he supervised the expansion of his fleet and the burgeoning of trade on the Murray-Darling.

Randell built a residence "Bleak House", a floating dock, wharf and warehouse at Mannum. At its peak around 1860, there would be 20,000 bales of wool unloaded at Mannum and driven by horse teams to Port Adelaide.

Randell served as a Justice of the Peace from 1861 in New South Wales, and from 1873 in South Australia. With the death of his father in 1876, Randell returned to Gumeracha and had little more to do with the river trade. His son (Richard) Murray Randell took over the fleet and the title "Captain Randell".

== Politics and last days ==
Randell represented Gumeracha in the South Australian House of Assembly from 1893 to 1899; while the oldest member of the house he regularly made the trip between his constituency and Parliament House in Adelaide.

Randell moved to North Adelaide in 1910 and died on 4 March 1911. He was survived by five sons and four daughters.

== Place in history ==
A. T. Saunders, more perhaps than any other historian, was scathing in his denunciation of Cadell, comparing his achievements unfavourably with those of Randell in scathing terms. Sir Richard Graves MacDonnell, previously Governor of South Australia, in a lecture entitled "Australia: What it is and what it may be", delivered at the Metropolitan Hall, Dublin, on 7 May 1863, was more temperate:

"The most remarkable voyage, however, which has hitherto been made in Australia most certainly was one undertaken by Mr. William Randell. That gentleman has scarcely had justice done here, for he appears to me, from indubitable evidence, to have been the first navigator of the Murray in a steamer. Yet, as he started in the year 1853, just before a trip made by the then Lieut. Governor, accompanied by Captain Cadell – one of the most enterprising, useful, and, I may say, ubiquitous of Australian pioneers – the official éclat and general importance of the latter somewhat obscured the more modest pretensions of Captain Randell. Not merely, however, was he the first to start, despite slender means and a frail steamer – which I believe he had himself built – but he actually persevered till he got to Echuca, which is farther by several hundred miles than Swan Hill, the point reached by Captain Cadell. Again, in 1859, Mr. Randell made another ascent of the Murray, and from it went up the Darling. I was myself at the time engaged in a pioneering voyage up that river, with Captain Cadell, and we had succeeded in reaching a point at Menindie, 1,200 miles from the sea, when, as we were descending, Mr. Randell appeared with, apparently, a rather crazy and broken-winded steamer, which vastly amused the natives by its melancholy wheezing and puffing. Yet in that boat Mr. Randell not merely succeeded in getting higher than our highest point, but, owing to a fortunate flood, was enabled to reach Fort Bourke. He then passed on to one of the Darling's upper branches, called the Barwon and Namoi, and finally proceeded to a distance which, after comparing notes with him on his return, and examining the maps, I could not make out to be less, if we included the extremely tortuous windings of the rivers, than 1,800 miles from the junction of the Darling with the Murray, and therefore 2,400 miles from the sea mouth of the latter. I remembered at the time transmitting a report to that effect to the Secretary of State. Thus in a country where drought and suffering from want of water are so common, Mr. Randell made a voyage of nearly double the length, possibly, of any European river."

== Family ==
William Randell married Elizabeth Ann "Annie" Nickels (1835 – 17 October 1924) on 24 December 1853. Their children included:

- Capt. William Beavis Randell (1 June 1856 – 19 September 1917) married Hannah Finlayson (1854–1928) He was a famous motor-cyclist who held a world record in 1914.

- Jessie Louise Randell (1887–1932) married Harold Sidney Metters ( – 1957) married in 1916. Harold was a grandson of Frederick Metters.

- David Finlayson Metters (1919–)
- John Raymond Metters (1920–)
- Bruce Dudley Metters (1922–)

- Elizabeth Hannah Randell (14 June 1858 – 1 December 1940) married George Frank Bradley.

- Frank Randell Bradley became deputy director of Posts and Telegraphs in Sydney.

- Mary Ann Randell (28 January 1860 – 17 February 1931) married Edward Kelly (1858 – 30 March 1931) on 20 July 1882, and farmed at "Sulby Glen", Cudlee Creek.
- Sarah Hamlin Randell (1862 – 14 August 1902) married Rev. Robert Taylor on 15 January 1891
- (Richard) Murray Randell (2 February 1863 – 6 March 1952) married Anne Florence "Florrie" McKirdy of Mannum on 3 July 1889; they lived at Myrtle Cottage, Mannum. Known as "Captain Randell", he managed the fleet of paddle steamers on the Murray for 56 years, and skippered most of them.
- Wentworth Neilpo Randell (1865 – 26 January 1866)
- James Percy Randell (22 April 1867 – 4 January 1914) married (Violet Sarah) Rose Bock
- Rosemund Randell (13 October 1868 – 16 May 1896) married Roland Thomas Mahnke
- Albert Wentworth Randell (18 September 1870 – 3 October 1923), also known as "Captain Randell", married Margaret McLean on 29 January 1891; she divorced him in 1910. He subsequently married Gertrude Hedwig Preiss (c. 1889 – 18 June 1912). He married once more, to Emma Agnes Stoeckel.
- Mabel Daisy Darling Randell (15 August 1872 – 7 September 1937) married Edward Kinmont of Mannum 15 November 1894
- Millicent Beatrice Swaine Randell (1875 – 3 August 1926) married William Bolitho White on 9 August 1900
- Alfred Swaine Randell (c. 1879 – 7 April 1953) married Olive Marion Wicksteed on 7 October 1908

== See also ==
- PS William Randell

Contemporary flour millers of South Australia included:

- John Dunn
- John Darling and Son
- John Hart and Henry Kent Hughes at Port Adelaide
- Benjamin Archer Kent, for whom Kent Town, the site of his mill, was named.
- John Ridley
- Thomas Magarey, James Magarey and his son William James Magarey
- Kossuth William Duncan

== Sources ==
- . Retrieved 10 October 2008.
- http://www.psmarion.com/html/william_randell.html
- Mennell, Philip (1892). "Randell, William Richard" . The Dictionary of Australasian Biography. London: Hutchinson & Co – via Wikisource.
