= Bryant Giles =

Australian politician

Bryant Lionel Giles (20 May 1928 – 12 August 2018) was an Australian politician who represented the South Australian House of Assembly seat of Gumeracha from 1968 to 1970 for the Liberal and Country League.

Parliament of South Australia
Preceded by Thomas Playford IV	Member for Gumeracha; 1968–1970	Seat abolished
