= Peter Howell (historian) =

British academic and historian (1941–2026)

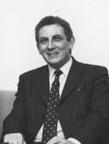
Peter Howell

Peter Adrian Howell (29 July 1941 – 15 August 2026) was a British academic and historian.

== Life and career ==
Howell was born in Malta on 29 July 1941. He began his career in 1964 as an assistant lecturer at the University of London; he later was promoted to lecturer in the Latin Department at Bedford College, where he remained until 1985. Howell moved to the Classics Department of the Royal Holloway and Bedford New College as lecturer from 1985 until 1994, and as senior lecturer from 1994 to 99.

Howell died on 15 August 2026, aged 85.

== Affiliations ==
- Westminster Cathedral Art Committee (1974–91)
- Dept. of Art and Architecture Liturgy Commission, Roman Catholic Bishops' Conference for England and Wales (1977–84)
- Churches Committee, English Heritage (1984–88)
- Westminster Cathedral Art and Architecture Committee (1993–?)
- Archdiocese of Westminster Historic Churches Committee (1995–99)
- Roman Catholic Historic Churches Committee for Wales and Herefordshire (1995–?)

== Writings ==
- Victorian Churches (1968)
- Companion Guide to North Wales (with Elisabeth Beazley, 1975)
- Companion Guide to South Wales (with Elisabeth Beazley, 1977)
- A Commentary on Book I of the Epigrams of Martial (1980)
- The Faber Guide to Victorian Churches (ed with Ian Sutton, 1989)
- Martial: The Epigrams, Book V (1996)
