= William Haines (South Australian politician) =

Australian politician

William Haines MHA
- Born: 6 April 1831; Trowbridge, Wiltshire, England
- Died: 11 June 1902 (aged 71); Tea Tree Gully, South Australia
- Occupations: gardener, publican, politician
- Spouse(s): Mary Tozer (c. 1823 – 27 April 1876), Margaret Roger McKinley née Cleland (c. 1807 – 9 January 1888), Ellen Atterton (c. 1847 – 9 May 1928)

Gumeracha
- In office 6 April 1878 – 7 April 1884

William Haines (6 April 1831 – 11 June 1902) was a South Australian politician who represented Gumeracha from 1878–1884.

== History ==
William Haines was born in Trowbridge, Wiltshire, England, and migrated to South Australia with his parents William Haines snr. (c. 1811 – 6 November 1863) and Jane Haines (née Cook) (1804 – 11 January 1862) and five younger siblings on the William Mitchell, arriving on 27 August 1840.

Their first accommodation was in "Emigration Square" (later to become the Hindmarsh police barracks) then in a settlement on North Terrace near Holy Trinity Church. His father found employment at the Government House vegetable garden, then became head gardener at the Botanic Gardens.

Around 1853 the family moved to Tea Tree Gully, where they set up a market garden. William was granted the license for the Highercombe Hotel adjacent to the family cottage. He was a popular host and successful publican, but shortly after the death of his wife Mary, transferred the license to his brother Ephraim. Two cottages and the orchard were disposed of. The hotel closed in 1878 and was bought by the Government the following year.

On 6 April 1878 Haines stood successfully for the seat of Gumeracha in the House of Assembly, and held it until 7 April 1884 when he was defeated, perhaps on account of a road ("Haines's Folly") from Tea Tree Gully to Anstey's Hill which he advocated.

Haines was clerk of the Teatree Gully District Council for 37 years, an active member of the Royal Agricultural and Horticultural Society for 40 years, and was a member of the school board and the Central Board of Health.

== See also ==
- Hundred of Haines
