= PS William Randell =

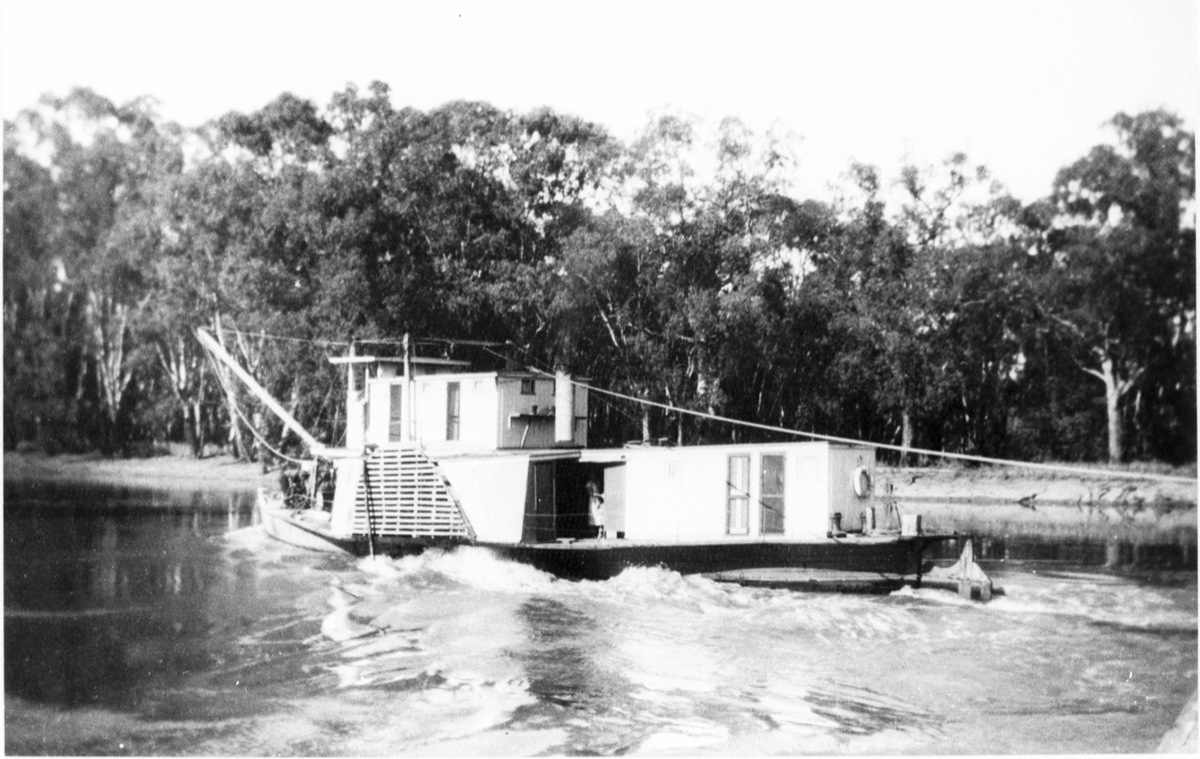

History

Australia
- Name: William Randell
- Route: River Murray, Australia
- Builder: Ruston Hornsby
- Commissioned: 1923
- Homeport: Hindmarsh Island, South Australia
- Nickname(s): Randell
- Status: Private vessel

General characteristics
- Class & type: Composite Paddle Steamer
- Length: 19 Meters
- Beam: 7 Meters
- Propulsion: Steam

The PS William Randell is a restored paddle steamer located at Hindmarsh Island.
