= William Jenkins (Australian politician) =

Australian politician

William Wilfred Jenkins (3 August 1895 – 30 August 1963) was an Australian politician who represented the South Australian House of Assembly seat of Stirling from 1952 to 1963 for the Liberal and Country League.

Parliament of South Australia
Preceded by Herbert Dunn	Member for Stirling; 1952–1963	Succeeded by William McAnaney
