= William McAnaney =

Australian politician

William McAnaney (13 June 1910 – 27 October 1987) was an Australian politician. He was a member of the South Australian House of Assembly between 1963 and 1975, representing the electorates of Stirling from 1963 to 1970 and Heysen from 1970 to 1975, for the Liberal and Country League and its successor the Liberal Party.

McAnaney was educated at a state school and at Scotch College. He worked for the National Bank after graduating from high school, and studied accountancy and commerce at night. In 1934, he began farming at Langhorne Creek. He attempted to enlist for service in World War II, but was rejected and served in the Volunteer Defence Corps. He also served as chairman of the District Council of Strathalbyn and had been state and federal president of the Australian Primary Producers Union. He unsuccessfully contested a 1956 federal by-election as an independent prior to his entrance into state politics; although the Liberal and Country League easily retained the seat, McAnaney received 7.4 percent of the vote.

Parliament of South Australia
Preceded by William Jenkins	Member for Stirling; 1963–1970	Succeeded by Electorate abolished
Preceded by New electorate	Member for Heysen; 1970–1975	Succeeded by David Wotton
