= Thomas Playford IV =

20th-century Australian politician and fruit grower (1896–1981)

The Honourable Sir Thomas Playford IV GCMG
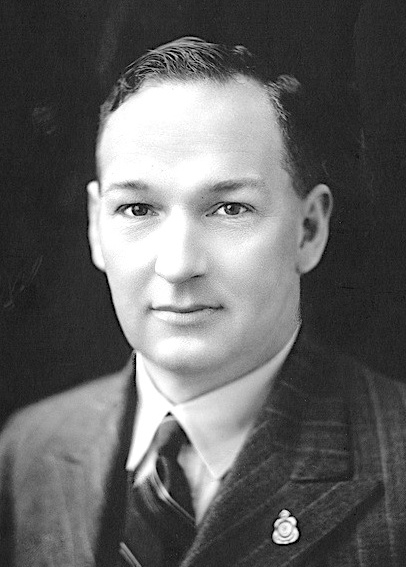
- Playford c. 1938

33rd Premier of South Australia
- In office 5 November 1938 – 10 March 1965
- Monarchs: George VI; Elizabeth II
- Governor: Lord Dugan; Sir Malcolm Barclay-Harvey; Lord Norrie; Sir Robert George; Sir Edric Bastyan
- Preceded by: Richard Layton Butler
- Succeeded by: Frank Walsh

Leader of the Opposition in South Australia
- In office 10 March 1965 – 13 July 1966
- Preceded by: Frank Walsh
- Succeeded by: Steele Hall

Treasurer of South Australia
- In office 5 November 1938 – 10 March 1965
- Premier: Himself
- Preceded by: Richard Layton Butler
- Succeeded by: Frank Walsh

Leader of the Liberal and Country League
- In office 3 November 1938 – 13 July 1966
- Preceded by: Richard L. Butler
- Succeeded by: Steele Hall

Member for Gumeracha
- In office 19 March 1938 – 2 March 1968
- Preceded by: Constituency Created
- Succeeded by: Bryant Giles

Member for Murray
- In office 8 April 1933 – 19 March 1938
- Preceded by: Robert Hunter
- Succeeded by: Constituency Abolished

Personal details
- Born: 5 July 1896 Norton Summit, South Australia, Australia
- Died: 16 June 1981 (aged 84) Adelaide, Australia
- Party: Liberal and Country League
- Spouse: Lorna Playford (née Clark)
- Children: 3
- Relatives: Thomas Playford II (grandfather)
- Occupation: Orchardist
- Profession: Politician

Military service
- Allegiance: Australia
- Years of service: 1915–1919
- Rank: Lieutenant
- Unit: 27th Battalion
- Battles/wars: World War I; Gallipoli campaign

Sir Thomas Playford GCMG (5 July 1896 – 16 June 1981) was an Australian politician from the state of South Australia. He served as Premier of South Australia and leader of the Liberal and Country League (LCL) from 5 November 1938 to 10 March 1965. Though controversial, it was the longest term of any elected government leader in Australian history. His tenure as premier was marked by a period of population and economic growth unmatched by any other Australian state. He was known for his parochial style in pushing South Australia's interests, and was known for his ability to secure a disproportionate share of federal funding for the state as well as his shameless haranguing of federal leaders. His string of election wins was supported by a system of malapportionment later dubbed the "Playmander".

Born into the Playford family, an old political family, he was the fifth Thomas Playford and the fourth to have lived in South Australia; his grandfather Thomas Playford II (Note: Delineating the various Thomas Playfords with a generation number is solely for ease of reference in this and related articles; in Australia there is no tradition of referring to "Thomas Playford II" in speech or in writing.) served as premier in the 19th century. He grew up on the family farm in Norton Summit before enlisting in the Australian Imperial Force in World War I, fighting in Gallipoli and Western Europe. After serving, he continued farming until his election as a representative for Murray at the 1933 state election. In his early years in politics, Playford was an outspoken backbencher who often lambasted LCL ministers and their policies, and had a maverick strategy, often defying party norms and advocating unadulterated laissez faire economics and opposing protectionism and government investment, in stark contrast to his later actions as premier. With the resignation of the LCL's leader, Richard Layton Butler, Playford became premier in 1938, having been made a minister just months earlier in an attempt to dampen his insubordination. Playford inherited a minority government and many independents to deal with, and instability was expected; he was seen as a transitional leader. However, Playford dealt with the independents adroitly and went on to secure a one-seat majority at the next election.

In office, Playford turned his back on laissez faire economics and encouraged industry to relocate to South Australia during World War II. He built upon this in the post-war boom years, particular in automotive manufacturing; although a liberal conservative, his approach to economics was expedient, and he was derided by his colleagues for his socialism as he nationalised electricity companies and used state enterprises to drive economic growth. Generally, Playford had more dissent from within his own party than the opposition centre-left Labor Party; the main obstructions to his initiatives came from the upper house, where the restriction of suffrage to landowners resulted in a chamber dominated by the conservative landed gentry. SA Labor's leader for most of the 1950s, Mick O'Halloran, worked cooperatively with Playford and was known to be happy being out of power, quipping that Playford could better serve his left-wing constituents. Playford's policies allowed for the supply of cheap electricity to factories, minimal business taxes, and low wages to make the state more attractive to industrial investment. He kept salaries low by using the South Australian Housing Trust to build public housing and government price controls to attract workers and migrants, angering the landlord class. Implemented in the 1940s, these policies were seen as dangerous to Playford's control of his party, but they proved successful and he cemented his position within the LCL.

During the 1950s, Playford and the LCL's share of the vote declined continually despite economic growth, and they clung to power mainly due to the Playmander, a malapportionment that severely underrepresented Adelaide. The malapportionment was strong enough to keep Playford in power even in years when the LCL just scraped into office, and sometimes when it lost by margins that would have seen him decisively beaten in the rest of Australia. Playford became less assured in parliament as Labor became more aggressive, with their leading debater Don Dunstan combatively disrupting the previously collaborative style of politics, targeting the injustice of the Playmander in particular. Playford's successful economic policies had fuelled a rapid expansion of the middle class, which wanted more government attention to education, public healthcare, the arts, the environment, and heritage protection; however, Playford was an unrelenting utilitarian, and was unmoved by calls to broaden policy focus beyond economic development. This was exacerbated by Playford and his party's failure to adapt to changing social mores, remaining adamantly committed to restrictive laws on alcohol, gambling and police powers. A turning point in Playford's tenure was the Max Stuart case in the 1950s, when Playford came under heavy scrutiny for his hesitation to grant clemency to a murderer on death row amid claims of judicial wrongdoing. Although Playford eventually commuted the sentence, the controversy was seen as the beginning of the end for the LCL, and he eventually lost office in the 1965 election. He relinquished the party leadership to Steele Hall and retired at the next election, serving on various South Australian company boards until his death in 1981.

== Early life ==
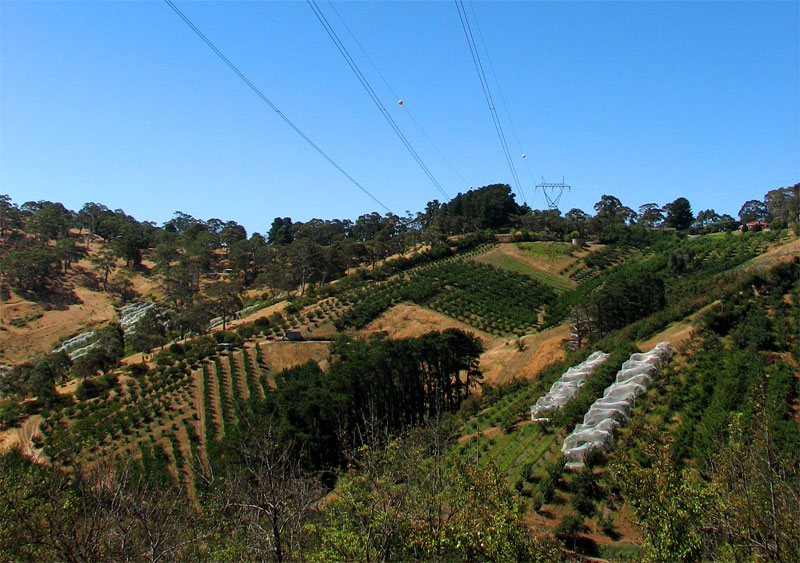
Playford's forebears had lived in the town of Norton Summit for generations. Pictured here are market gardens on the hills near the town.

Thomas Playford was the third child born to the Playford family, with two sisters before him and one following. He started school at the age of six, going to the local Norton Summit School. The school had one room, one teacher, two assistants and 60 students, and taught children aged six to twelve. Playford, while an adept learner, frequently argued with his teacher, and was the first child to have been caned there. While learning, he accompanied his father down to the East End Markets with their farming produce.

It was the influence of Playford's mother, Elizabeth, that contributed to his relative Puritanism and social habits. She was a devout Baptist Christian, and it was primarily because of her that he publicly abstained from alcohol, smoking, and gambling throughout his lifetime. However, despite her influence on his social habits, he did not regularly attend church like his family. His father suffered a fall and a broken leg when Playford was thirteen. He requested permission to leave school and take over the family farm; this was granted, and the boy, even after his father had recovered, dominated the management of the farm. While out of school, Playford continued to learn; he joined the local Norton Summit Society, and took part in classes and debates in Adelaide. He won a public speaking award for a speech he made to an Adelaide literary society.

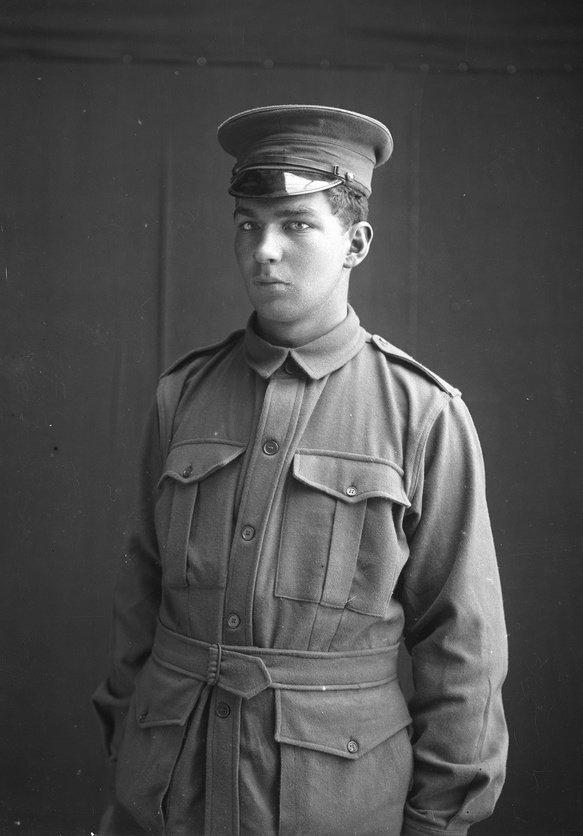
Playford in 1915, as a lieutenant in the 27th Battalion of the Australian Imperial Force.

World War I broke out in 1914, and Playford wished to join the Australian Imperial Force. His parents persuaded him to assist them on the farm until close to his 19th birthday. He entered Keswick Barracks on 17 May 1915, was enlisted as a private and placed in the 27th Battalion, 2nd Division. Playford was one of those who left Adelaide on HMAT Geelong on 31 May. The Geelong picked up more soldiers at Perth, and then sailed to Suez, Egypt. The Australian soldiers received training in Egypt, but during the evenings left their camps to indulge themselves in the Egyptian towns and cities. Frequent fights broke out between the Australian troops and the locals, with responsible soldiers left to take the rest back to camp. Playford assisted in this and dragged Australian soldiers from the beds of Egyptian prostitutes. Training was completed after two months and Playford landed at Anzac Cove on 12 September 1915.

After taking part in the Gallipoli Campaign, Playford and his battalion left for France on 15 March 1916. He fought on the Western Front and was shot and wounded on 20 October, evacuated to London, and kept out of action for a year. Playford endured many operations during this time to remove the shrapnel that had penetrated his body, although some of it remained within him, and his hearing was permanently damaged. Turning down an offer for a staff job in India, Playford returned to his battalion in October 1917 and continued fighting in Belgium and France.

With the end of the Great War, Playford returned to South Australia with his battalion, disembarking at Outer Harbor, Adelaide on 2 July 1919. He had received no decorations, but had been commissioned from the ranks as an officer and was honourably discharged in October with the rank of lieutenant. Despite Playford's intellectual capability, he shunned the Government's offer of free university education for soldiers and returned to his orchard. He continued growing cherries on the property, and engaged in his hobby of horticulture. His involvement in various organisations and clubs was renewed.

Through relatives Playford met his future wife Lorna Clark (1906–1986), who lived with her family in Nailsworth. Although both families were religiously devout, the Clarks were even more so than the Playfords, and a long courtship ensued. Taking her out on his Harley Davidson motorcycle at night, the two were forced to leave the theatre halfway through performances so as to not raise the ire of the Clarks. Before their wedding on 1 January 1928, they were engaged for three years. During their engagement, Playford built their new house on his property, mostly by his own hands and indented in the hills themselves; it remained their home throughout their lives.

Two years later, on Christmas Day, 1930, the family's first daughter was born, Margaret. Two more children were born to the family; Patricia in 1936, and Thomas Playford V in 1945. All three of them attended private schools: Patricia attended the Presbyterian Girls' College, becoming a teacher; and Margaret attended Methodist Ladies' College, later training as a child psychiatrist. The sixth Thomas wanted to attend university, but, like his forebears, was rebuked and worked on the orchard. Like a Playford before him, he became a minister of religion in his later life.

== Political career ==
Among the organisations that Playford belonged to was the local branch of the Liberal Federation, yet until the months preceding his eventual election, he never talked of holding political office. The Liberal Federation was considering a merger with the Country Party to avoid Labor retaining office during the Great Depression. Archie Cameron, an old wartime friend of Playford's and a federal Coalition MP, influenced Playford to run for office when he heard of the merger. In 1932 the Liberal and Country League (LCL) was created, and Playford ran for the multi-member constituency of Murray at the 1933 election.

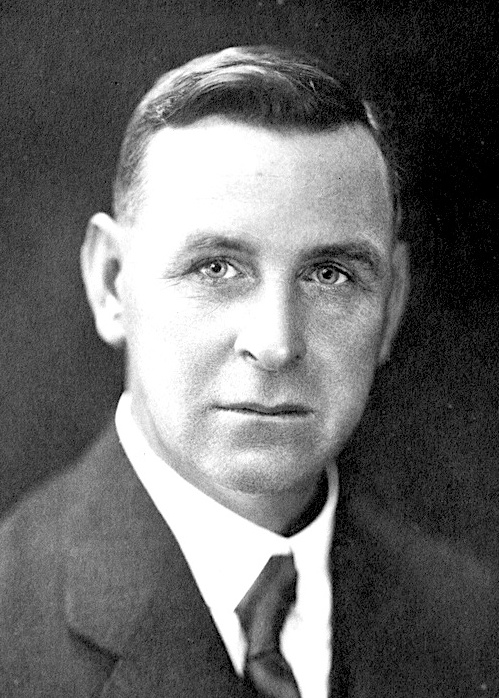
Richard Layton Butler, first LCL Premier of South Australia and Playford's predecessor

Along with the other LCL hopefuls, Playford journeyed around the electorate advocating his platform. The constituency had a considerable German element, descendants of refugees who had escaped persecution in the German Empire. Grateful for the past help of Playford's grandfather, they swung their strong support behind him and he was comfortably elected to the South Australian House of Assembly. With a split in the Labor vote, the first LCL government was formed with Richard Layton Butler as Premier.

For the next five years Playford was to remain a backbencher, and to involve himself relatively little in government matters. His speeches were short, but to the point, and, running against the norm, he often attacked the government itself when he saw fit. The historian Peter Howell said that Playford was "an unusually insolent and disloyal backbencher, always concerned to cut a figure and ridicule his party's leader". A new member's maiden speech is traditionally heard politely without the interruption and heckling prevalent in Australian politics, but Playford's aggressive debut in parliament was not accorded this privilege as "a casual visitor could have mistaken him" for an opposition member.

At one point, a visibly angry Premier Butler interjected after Playford attacked the members of the Employment Promotion Council. In his opening address, Playford individually mocked the bureaucrats who comprised various government bodies, and then condemned public transport monopolies, as well as declaring "It is not our business to worry whether people go broke or not". This comment provoked interjections from both government and opposition members—in the midst of the Great Depression, Playford's unashamed and aggressive promotion of his unbridled laissez faire philosophy stood out amidst the increasing prevalence of government intervention.

During his first term in parliament, Playford also gained attention for his unconvincing command of the English language; he developed a reputation for mispronouncing common words, using bad syntax, and speaking in a monotone. He continued to attack his ministers, and complaints from the likes of Public Works Minister Herbert Hudd only encouraged Playford to further mock him. He consistently opposed the liberalisation of liquor trading, having been unimpressed by the drunken behaviour he had witnessed while in the military. He continued to stridently support economic rationalism, something he would later renege on as premier. He opposed government investment in capital works as a means of generating employment and stimulating the economy during the Depression, and called for a decrease in dairy production within the state on the basis that it was more efficient to import from interstate, where rainfall was higher and grazing was more effective. Playford further criticised government subsidies to work farms designed to alleviate unemployment among Indigenous Australians, claiming that the cost exceeded that of the standard jobless payment. He also endorsed the privatisation of unprofitable state railways and denounced tariff protection as rewarding inefficiency and non-innovation. In 1936, Playford defied his party by voting against the formation of the South Australian Housing Trust. Nevertheless, despite his refusal to toe the party line, Playford was well regarded for his studious attitude to research and his preparation of his speeches.

A great deal of activity was occurring around Playford. Legislation provided for the tools that he was to inherit later as Premier: aggressive economic initiatives, a malapportioned electoral system and a staid internal party organisation. The state had been persistently in deficit in recent times, and as an agriculture-dominant state, had been at the mercy of commodity prices, so a strategy of industrialisation was initiated under the guidance of senior politicians, public servants and industrialists. The creation of the LCL was dependent on the implementation of various policies to ensure the strength of the party's country faction. There had been an electoral bias in favour of rural areas since the Constitution Act of 1857, but it was now to dramatically increase. In 1936, legislation was brought in that stipulated that electoral districts were to be malapportioned to a ratio of at least 2:1 in favour of country areas. In addition, the 46 multimember districts were replaced with 39 single-member districts—13 in Adelaide and 26 in the country. Over the next three decades, Adelaide's population grew until it had triple the population of the country, but the distribution of seats in the legislature gave rural voters a disproportionate influence by a factor of six. The desired long-term effect was to lock the opposition Labor Party out of power; the unexpected short-term effect was a large number of dissatisfied rural independents in the 1938 election. Although he played no part in its development or implementation, the electoral system gerrymander was later christened the 'Playmander', as a result of its benefit to Playford, and his failure to take action towards reforming it.

After the Liberals won the 1938 election, with Playford having transferred to Gumeracha, Butler sought to tame Playford's aggressive oratory approach towards the LCL cabinet by offering him a ministry. Playford entered the cabinet in March 1938 as the Commissioner of Crown Lands, and held portfolios in Irrigation and Repatriation. The new frontbencher subsequently adopted a more moderate style of parliamentary conduct. Butler abandoned the Premiership in November to seek election for the federal seat of Wakefield, a Liberal stronghold that had been vacated by the death of sitting member Charles Hawker in an aviation accident. Despite having been in cabinet for only a few months, Playford was unanimously elected as the new leader of the LCL by his peers, and thus became the 33rd Premier of South Australia. Like Butler, he also served as his own state Treasurer. While he was regarded as a compromise candidate who was able to appeal to both urban and rural voters, it was thought that Playford would only be a transitional leader before someone else took over the LCL leadership. No one foresaw that they were witnessing the start of the longest tenure in office for a state or territory leader in Australian history; he would remain in power for almost 27 years. Playford's tenure was the first in which the title "premier" was officially applied; until that point, the Treasurer was the head of the government, although Premier had been in de facto use for several years.

Upon his ascension, Playford headed a minority government; the LCL only held 15 of the 39 seats in the lower house. The balance of power was held by 13 mostly conservative independents. Many had gained from discontent over Butler's relatively liberal social stances, so Playford sought to assuage them by having his LCL colleagues refrain from upsetting social conservatives. He also used the threat of an early election to deter the independents from stalling his initiatives—with their lack of party infrastructure and funding, they would be the most vulnerable to election campaigns.

== World War II ==
Playford became a wartime Premier in 1939 when Australia, as part of the British Empire, entered World War II. Later in the war, cut off from traditional suppliers of manufactures, the country was forced to create its own. Armaments and munitions factories needed to be created to supply the war effort, and Playford was vociferous in advocating South Australia as the perfect location for these. It was far from the battlegrounds and had the most efficient labour force in the nation. British Tube Mills opened a mill in the inner-northern suburbs. Ammunition factories were built in the northern and western suburbs of Adelaide, as well as in some smaller installations in regional centres, and construction on a shipyard began in Whyalla. Having strenuously opposed a construction of a pipeline to pump water from Morgan in the Murray River to Whyalla for the Whyalla Steelworks and blast furnace there before his ascension to the premiership, Playford oversaw approval of the Morgan-Whyalla pipeline in 1940 and its completion in 1944. He also reversed his previous opposition to Butler's pine plantation and sawmill program, authorising an expansion of the program in the state's southeast.

Salisbury, then a dormitory town to the north of Adelaide, became a defence centre; the shipyards at Whyalla began launching corvettes in 1941 just as Japan entered the war. All of these developments were done under Playford's watch, with most of the factories being built by the Department of Manpower and the South Australian Housing Trust. In Woodville in western Adelaide, a large plant for Actil cotton was built. The explosives factory at Salisbury was converted into an aerospace research facility after the war, as various companies worked on matters related to rocket testing at Woomera in the state's far north; the Salisbury complex became the second largest employer of South Australians for a period after the war. The munitions factory in the western suburb of Hendon was later converted into a plant for the electrical appliance firm Philips and at its peak employed more than three thousand people.

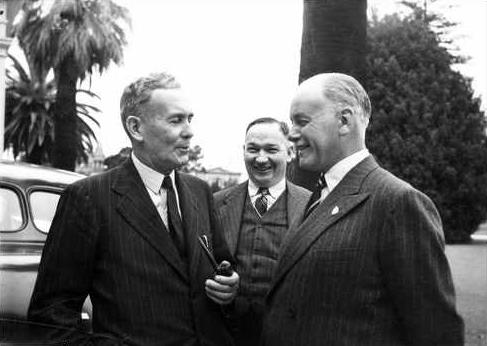
Ben Chifley (left), Labor Prime Minister, enjoyed a strong relationship with Playford (centre), despite their differing political allegiances.

For these developments to occur, Playford personally had to attend to the bureaucracy that stood in the way. He confronted public service workers, and successfully negotiated with the heads of private companies. But it was negotiations with the federal government that were to prove the hardest. In his time as Premier, Playford was to confront seven different Prime Ministers: Lyons, Page, Menzies, Fadden, Curtin, Forde and Chifley. Strangely, he enjoyed best relations with the Laborite Chifley, and had a poor rapport with his fellow conservative, Menzies. During the wartime years, Menzies's reluctance to meet with Playford initially hampered industrial efforts, but Playford's other federal colleagues made sure that deals could be made.

To Playford's advantage there was usually a disproportionate number of South Australians in federal cabinets, both Liberal and Labor. This clout, combined with his own intensive and unconventional negotiating tactics, made sure that South Australia regularly received more federal funds than it would have been allocated otherwise. This was to Robert Menzies's chagrin, who said: "Tom [Playford] wouldn't know intellectual honesty if he met it on the end of a pitch fork but he does it all for South Australia, not for himself, so I forgive him." By the time of his departure from power, Playford gained the reputation of being "a good South Australian but a very bad Australian", and for using "threats to bully recalcitrant Prime Ministers". For his part, Playford remained unrepentant, claiming that federal authorities had infringed the constitution of Australia and had consistent exercised powers over the states that were not rightfully theirs. Playford accused the High Court of Australia of helping the federal parliament under Curtin to legislate to give itself a monopoly on the acquisition of income tax, which he claimed was contrary to the intention of the constitution to prevent excessive centralisation of power in the federal government. In 1958, he threatened to take the federal government to the High Court, which led to South Australia being given more compensation under the River Murray Waters Agreement for the loss of water from the Snowy River. Three years later he went to the High Court in an attempt to have Canberra pay for the standardisation of the gauge on the Broken Hill-Port Pirie railway.

During the war, two state elections were held, in 1941 and 1944. In the 1941 election, there was a significant decrease in the independent vote, and both the Labor Party and the LCL picked up a five-seat swing for a total of 20 seats, just enough for Playford to govern in majority. This was in large part due to the LCL's shift to the right on social issues to usurp the independents' appeal. In 1942, compulsory voting (but not enrolment) was introduced, and first took effect at the 1944 election, with an increase in voter turnout from 51% to 89%. Again Playford won with a one-seat LCL majority, hanging on with the help of the malapportioned electoral system.

Power and water schemes were expanded to be able to cope with the industrial development occurring. The state was at a disadvantage in that it was completely reliant on imports for its fuel supply. South Australia's near-monopoly electricity supplier, the Adelaide Electricity Supply Company (AESC), was reluctant to build up coal reserves in case of a transportation problem. They ran on coal that was shipped over from New South Wales (NSW), where the mines were inefficient and plagued by communist-agitated industrial strife. Playford demanded that supplies be built up so the factories could keep producing; he managed to secure eight months worth of coal reserves from NSW, but even that began to dwindle due to the continued industrial action. Coal supplies were ordered from South Africa in desperation, at Playford's behest. The frustration he experienced while dealing with the AESC would later prove disastrous to the company as the Premier took action against them.

== Industrialisation ==
The AESC continued to snub the government. Playford advocated the use of brown coal from the South Australian Leigh Creek mine to avoid supply complications, and even made into law a bill encouraging its use. He also championed the development of the town and the expansion of the mine, which had been dormant for several decades, to ease the state's dependency on imported coal. Much state and federal government money was invested in the scheme, the town infrastructure was built, and the production started in February 1944. Shortly afterwards, the AESC responded by buying new boilers which could only use the more productive black coal. With more conflicts ensuing, and even with the company slowly relenting, Playford did not stop his struggle. A Royal Commission in March 1945 was appointed to ascertain a solution between the two parties, and presented its report in August with a recommendation that the AESC be nationalised. A few months later, Playford's stance received a boost when heavy strikes in New South Wales forced shutdowns in South Australia that saw thousands of labourers out of work. By then heading the only conservative government in the nation, when Playford requested commonwealth funds to assist in the nationalisation of the AESC, Prime Minister Chifley responded with glee and enthusiasm. On 11 October, he presented a bill to Parliament to nationalise the AESC and create the Electricity Trust of South Australia.

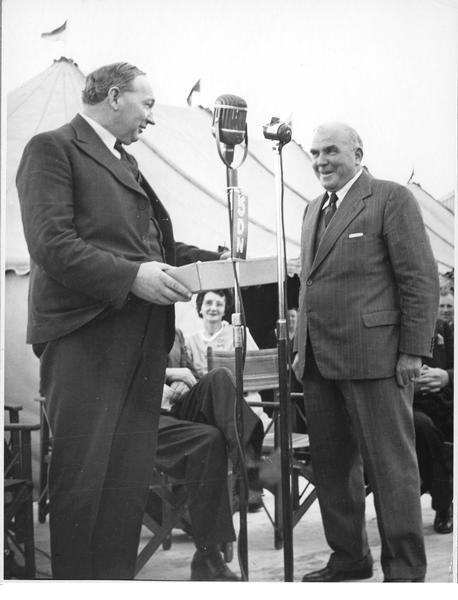
Sir Thomas Playford (left) receiving a barometer as a gift at the opening of the Birkenhead Terminal, Port Adelaide, 1950

Labor, astonished that such an action was to come from a Liberal Premier, resolutely supported the bill, guaranteeing it passage through the House of Assembly 29–6, the only dissenters being LCL members. However, the Legislative Council was dominated by economic conservatives, fierce adherents of free enterprise and opponents of what they considered to be undue government intervention in the economy. The LCL councillors tried to have the bill watered down to allow merely for government control of AESC for a brief period. In the Council, where suffrage was reliant upon wage and property requirements, the ALP only held four seats out of twenty, and only five LCL members supported the nationalisation. Thus, on 7 November, the bill failed to pass and it was not put to the Parliament again until 1946. On 6 April, after months of campaigning on Playford's part, he managed to change the mind of MLC Jack Bice, and the bill passed. The Electricity Trust of South Australia was formed, and was to become a major aid to post-war industrialisation.

The decision to nationalise AESC and develop Leigh Creek proved to be prescient. In early 1947, mines in New South Wales were again crippled by strikes. The worst strike came in 1949, forcing Chifley to send in the armed forces to extract coal. While the other states had to suffer industrial power rationing and thus reduced manufacturing output and more unemployment, South Australia managed to escape as the miners at Leigh Creek worked around the clock. Within four years the mine was operating at a surplus and the town was further rewarded with federal funding. From 1947 until the end of Playford's leadership in 1965, the output of the mine increased tenfold to almost two million tons a year. Transport infrastructure was improved, European immigrant workers were recruited, and twin power plants at Port Augusta were completed in 1960 and named after the premier. The new plants exclusively used Leigh Creek coal and by 1970, the whole state was self-sufficient for electricity. ETSA and the mine were generating enough revenue to maintain the town—sometimes dubbed Uncle Tom's Baby—and mine of Leigh Creek and making a profit as well. From 1946 to 1965, the proportion of South Australians connected to electricity increased from 70 to 96%.

The nationalisation of the AESC was the most prominent manifestation of Playford's economic pragmatism; although ideologically a supporter of free enterprise like his colleagues, he saw ideology as secondary if in the way of his objectives. He had little time for those who objected to plans that were for the betterment of South Australia, despite these plans being contrary to particular interpretations of party ideology. The struggle for Leigh Creek was seen as a critical point in Playford's premiership; a second legislative failure was seen as being potentially fatal for Playford's leadership of his party, but the successful passage of the bill enhanced his image and gave himi enduring control over his party for the rest of his career, although it angered some of the staunch LCL conservatives in the upper house for some time; a significant number of them refused to talk to Playford for a substantial period of time thereafter.

During the post-war boom, the methods used to set up business in South Australia were unique. Playford's government would charge little to no business tax, supply cheap electricity, land and water, and have the Housing Trust build the factories and workers' homes. Consumer goods and automotive factories were created in the northern and western suburbs of Adelaide; mining, steel and shipbuilding industries appeared in the 'Iron Triangle' towns of Whyalla, Port Pirie and Port Augusta. Prices and wages were kept relatively low to enable continued investment, and South Australia was slower than the other states to abolish these wartime measures to increase its industrial competitiveness. The government initiatives managed to overcome the large logistic burden, as Adelaide and South Australia were far from the markets where the goods would be sold.

The Housing Trust was a key plank in Playford's campaign to keep costs low and promote investment. By providing cheap housing, workers could also be persuaded to accept lower salaries, therefore keeping production costs down. In 1940, Playford introduced the Housing Improvement Act to parliament, having seen the benefits of the Housing Trust's activities. The main aims of the legislation were "to improve the adverse housing conditions" by replacing "insanitary, old, crowded, or obsolete dwelling houses" with better-quality buildings—at the time many older residences in the city centre were made of corrugated iron and many areas were slum-like. The law forced landlords to provide a minimum standard of housing and enacted rent controls, setting a maximum rent for various houses; at the time many landlords bought large numbers of low-quality dwellings and charged tenants exorbitant prices. It also expanded the role of the Housing Trust, potentially undercutting the rentier class. Labor were taken aback by Playford's move, as this was the start of a trend whereby the nominally conservative government pursued policies that were more left-wing than other Labor governments across the country. After expressing shock at Playford's "loving kindness to the poor and distressed", Labor helped to get the legislation—which threatened the interests of the landlord class that traditionally supported the LCL—passed into law. During one 15-year period, Housing Trust rents were not increased once despite steady inflation.

Many of the methods that Playford used were described by economic conservatives as 'socialism', drawing opposition from within his own party, especially in the Legislative Council. It is even said that the Liberal leader in that chamber—Sir Collier Cudmore—once referred to Playford as a 'Bolshevik'. The unique economic intervention earned Playford scorn from his own colleagues, but the Labor movement was much more receptive. Indeed, Labor leader Mick O'Halloran would dine with Playford on a weekly basis to discuss the development of the state, and the pair were on close personal terms. At a dinner party, O'Halloran remarked that "I wouldn't want to be Premier even if I could be. Tom Playford can often do more for my own voters than I could if I were in his shoes." O'Halloran's lack of ambition was mocked in a political cartoon, but the Labor leader took the piece as a compliment and had it framed and put on display. As Playford had more opposition from his LCL colleagues in the upper house than Labor, O'Halloran was often described as the premier's 'junior partner". Playford called Labor "our Opposition", in comparison to opponents in his party, which he decried as being "critical without being helpful". This cooperative nature of party politics would not change until Don Dunstan's prominence in the late 1950s, when Playford would be assailed not for his economics, but for his government's comparatively low expenditure on public services such as education and healthcare.

Large projects were commenced. The city of Elizabeth was built by the Housing Trust in Adelaide's north, for the production of Holden motor vehicles. Populated mainly by working-class English migrants, it was, before its eventual economic and social decline, a showcase of successful city planning.

Playford also successfully coaxed Chrysler to stay in Adelaide and expand its operations. The Housing Trust sold the Tonsley Park where the car manufacturing plant was set up, and helped to install railyards, electricity and water infrastructure there, as it had done at Elizabeth. By the time Playford left office, Holden and Chrysler employed around 11,000 workers, 11% of the state's manufacturing employees. After earlier failed attempts to bring a tyre factory to Adelaide, the plans to build the Port Stanvac Refinery which would produce hydrocarbons used in synthetic rubber—in the early 1960s were enough to convince both a Dunlop Rubber-Olympic joint venture and SA Rubber Mills (later Bridgestone Australia) to start manufacturing operations.

Playford also sought to involve South Australia in uranium mining, which he saw as both a means of providing electricity for powering industrial development, and as a means of ensconcing the state in the anti-communist alliance in the midst of the Cold War. He was supported his venture by federal subsidies and concessions. After the deposits at Mount Painter were deemed to be unsuitable, the focus turned to Radium Hill and significant state government money was invested into research. State and federal laws were changed to allow for mining at Radium Hill and exportation of uranium; Playford also publicly advocated for nuclear power. Rewards were offered for the discovery of uranium deposits, but no suitable reserves were found, so Radium Hill was the only project to proceed. The Korean War had just erupted, and the American government was anxious to secure uranium for nuclear weapons. Playford was able to exploit this to secure "the easiest and most generous [deal] in the history of uranium negotiations". It was the highest purchase of uranium the Americans made during the Cold War and they contributed £4m for infrastructure development. Mining started in November 1954, and lasted for the seven-year-period of the contract with the Americans. Almost a million tonnes of ore had been mined, amounting to nearly £16m in contracts. Radium Hill had made a profit but was closed as higher-grade alternatives were discovered elsewhere and a new buyer could not be found. Playford also attempted to have the Australian Atomic Energy Commission based in the state, but failed; the nation's only nuclear reactor was built at Lucas Heights on the outskirts of Sydney.

When Playford left office in 1965, South Australia's population had doubled from 600,000 in the late 1930s to 1.1 million, the highest proportionate rate among the states. The economy had done likewise, and personal wealth had increased at the same rate, second only to Victoria. During Playford's 27 years in power, employment in manufacturing in South Australia had increased by 173%; Western Australia was in second place with 155% growth, while the national average was during the period was 129%. The state's share of Australia's manufacturing sector increased from 7.7 to 9.2%. However, there was criticism that Playford had diversified secondary industries enough, that industrial growth was beginning to lag the other states in the last decade of his leadership, and that the reliance on automotive production—Holden and Chrysler were 15% of the economy—made the economy more vulnerable to shocks in the future. Playford was also criticised for his informal style and tendency to rely on a small circle of public servants, sidelining much of his cabinet and not leaving a legacy of industrial infrastructure. Blewett and Jaensch said that Playford's "ad hoc methods and personalised administration" had worked well but said he needed a "more sophisticated" approach in later years, and was unable to adapt.

== Don Dunstan ==
At the 1953 election, the young lawyer Don Dunstan was elected to the House of Assembly as the Labor member for Norwood, ousting the LCL incumbent. Playford had landed unexpectedly in his role as the undisputed leader of his party, while Dunstan was, from the start of his parliamentary career, a stand-out among his own ranks and an excellent orator in parliament. Dunstan and Playford were each other's principal antagonists.

Playford, used to cooperating with Labor leaders more than attacking them, sensed Dunstan's promise and, predicting that one day Dunstan would be at the helm, attempted to establish bonds. So, after a late session of parliament at night, Playford would give Dunstan a lift home in his car. As Dunstan's home was situated on George Street, Norwood, it was only a small deviance from Playford's normal route to his home in Norton Summit. The topics that the two discussed were not ever completely revealed, yet Playford, according to Dunstan, would talk to him in a paternalistic manner. The two built up somewhat of a relationship and developed a respect for each other, but due to the strength of their respective views (Playford was a liberal conservative, Dunstan a libertarian socialist), did not establish the same type of bond that Playford had with earlier Laborites.

To face an opposition that was becoming uncooperative was not what Playford has expected, or could satisfactorily handle. Before the effect Dunstan had on Parliament, Playford would meet with Labor leaders to discuss bills, and ensure bipartisan support in the House of Assembly for them; there was little discordance on matters. The belligerents were previously only rural independent members.

Even while the economic boom continued, the LCL vote gradually declined after 1941. Even at the height of Playford's dominance, the LCL was almost nonexistent in Adelaide. With few exceptions, its support in the capital was limited to the eastern crescent and the Holdfast Bay area even at the height of Playford's power. It relied on favourable preferences from minor parties and independents and the malapportioned electoral system to stay in office. Even then, however, even at the peak of its power, the LCL usually scraped into office; it never held more than 23 seats (two more than needed to govern) at any point in Playford's tenure. It did, however, win a majority of actual votes, barring 1944 and 1953, on a two-party-preferred basis until 1962. At the two elections where Labor won a majority, it did so with a margin that would have yielded a decisive Labor majority in the rest of Australia. However, due to the Playmander, those majorities were largely wasted on landslides in Adelaide.

Knowing that the Playmander made a statewide campaign fruitless, Labor had begun to combat the Playmander by directing its efforts at individual seats. Slowly, LCL seats were whittled away—Dunstan's victory in Norwood in 1953 was followed by the losses of Murray, Millicent and Frome in 1956, and Mt Gambier and Wallaroo in 1957–8 by-elections. Playford's dominance over the party and his ignorance of the wishes of its broad membership base brought about a degree of disillusionment, and the party machine began to decay. The dominance stopped the emergence of a new generation of political talent, and had a "stultifying" effect. Although the Playmander ensured his ongoing electoral success, and Playford was credited with South Australia's economic success, the LCL polled a lower percentage than the corresponding Liberal government at federal level. Even though O'Halloran had despaired of ever winning power, by the time of his death in 1960, Labor was only four seats behind the LCL; it had faced a 10-seat deficit when he succeeded Robert Richards as Opposition Leader in 1949.

During this period, Prime Minister Menzies recommended that Playford be bestowed with a form of honours. Playford's wish was to be made a privy councillor, yet, while entirely possible, if granted it would lead to demands from other state Premiers. Playford's grandfather had declined a KCMG, and Playford himself did initially, but under the influence of Menzies he eventually accepted the honour and was knighted in 1957, but this time a class above the KCMG; the GCMG.

== Max Stuart trial ==
In December 1958, an event that initially had nothing to do with Playford, occurred, and eventually intensified into a debacle that was regarded as a turning point in his premiership and marked the beginning of the end of his rule.

A young girl was found raped and murdered, and Max Stuart, an Aboriginal man, was convicted and sentenced to be executed only a month later, on the basis of a confession gained during interrogation, although he had protested his innocence in pidgin English. Stuart's lawyer claimed that the confession was forced, and appeals to the Supreme and High Courts were dismissed. A linguist who investigated the case thought that the style of English in the confession was inconsistent with Stuart's background and speech. This aroused disquiet and objections against the fairness of the trial among an increasing number of legal academics and judges, and The News brought much attention to Stuart's plight with an aggressive, tabloid-style campaign. Soon, the case attracted international attention, some on the assumption that the legal system was racist. The former High Court Justice Sir John Latham also spoke out.

During this time, Stuart's execution had been delayed on multiple occasions. On 6 July, Playford and the Executive Council decided not to reprieve Stuart, and he was due to be executed the next day, but an appeal to the Privy Council in London stalled proceedings again. However, this also failed. Labor then tried to introduce legislation to stall the hanging.

Amid loud outcry, Playford started a Royal Commission to review the case. However, two of the Commissioners appointed, Chief Justice Mellis Napier and Justice Geoffrey Reed, had already been involved, Napier as presiding judge in the Full Court appeal and Reed as the trial judge. This provoked worldwide controversy with claims of bias from the likes of the President of the Indian Bar Council, the British judge Norman Birkett, the leader of the United Kingdom Liberal Party Jo Grimond and former British Prime Minister Clement Attlee. Years later, Playford admitted that he erred in his appointments of Reed and Napier and that it could have shaken public confidence on the fairness of the hearing.

The Royal Commission began its work and the proceedings were followed closely and eagerly debated by the public. As Playford had not shown an inclination to commute Stuart's sentence, Dunstan introduced a bill to abolish capital punishment. The vote was split along party lines and was thus defeated, but Dunstan used the opportunity to attack the Playmander with much effect in the media, portraying the failed legislation as an unjust triumph of a malapportioned minority who had a vengeance mentality over an electorally repressed majority who wanted a humane outcome.

Amid the continuing uproar, Playford decided to grant clemency. He gave no reason for his decision. The Royal Commission continued its work and concluded that the guilty verdict was sound. Although a majority of those who spoke out against the handling of the matter thought that Stuart was probably guilty, the events provoked heated and bitter debate in South Australian society and destabilised Playford's administration. According to Ken Inglis, "most of the responsibility for letting the ... general controversy ... [lies with] Sir Thomas Playford and his ministers ... [Theirs] was the response of men who were convinced that the affairs of the society were in good hands, and that only the naive and the mischievous would either doubt this general truth or challenge any particular application of it." Blewett and Jaensch said that the "clumsy handling" of the case was a manifestation of "the inevitable hubris of men too long in power".

== Political decline ==
House of Assembly results during Playford's Premiership
% (seats)	ALP	LCL	IND	OTH	ALP 2PP	LCL 2PP
1965	55.04 (21)	35.93 (17)	1.88 (1)	7.16	54.3	45.7
1962	53.98 (19)	34.51 (18)	3.15 (2)	8.37	54.3	45.7
1959	49.35 (17)	36.95 (20)	5.93 (2)	7.77	49.7	50.3
1956	47.37 (15)	36.69 (21)	7.34 (3)	8.60	48.7	51.3
1953	50.84 (14)	36.45 (21)	11.10 (4)	1.60	53.0	47.0
1950	48.09 (12)	40.51 (23)	10.07 (4)	1.34	48.7	51.3
1947	48.64 (13)	40.38 (23)	6.20 (3)	4.77	48.0	52.0
1944	42.52 (16)	45.84 (20)	6.64 (3)	5.00	53.3	46.7
1941	33.25 (11)	37.55 (20)	29.20 (8)	0.00
Primary source: UWA – TPP sources: ABC and Professional Historians

Playford was confronted with an economic recession when he went into the election of 1962. Earlier, in late 1961, the federal Liberal-Country coalition suffered a 13-seat swing and barely held onto government. Menzies's majority was slashed from 32 to 2. In the 1962 election, the Labor Party gained 54.3% of the two-party-preferred vote to the LCL's 45.7 percent. However, due to the Playmander, this was only enough to net Labor 19 seats to the LCL's 18. The balance of power rested with two independents, Tom Stott and Percy Quirke. On election night, it was thought that Playford's long tenure was over, but he did not concede. There was speculation that Playford would let an inexperienced Labor form a minority government as the economic difficulties might make it a poisoned chalice. After a week of silence he said he would not resign, and would see how the independents lined up when parliament reconvened. Labor needed the support of only one of the independents to make O'Halloran's successor, Frank Walsh, premier, while the LCL needed them both for a 10th term in government. They swung their support behind Playford and allowed his government to continue for another term; in return Quirke joined the LCL and was appointed to cabinet, while Stott was appointed speaker. Nonetheless, much media fanfare was made of the result, and of the detrimental effects of the 'Playmander'. Walsh declared the result "a travesty of electoral injustice" and lobbied the governor to not invite Playford to form government, to no avail. The election showed just how distorted the Playmander had become. Adelaide now accounted for two-thirds of the state's population, but a country vote was effectively worth two to 10 times a vote in Adelaide. Walsh had been denied victory despite winning a 2PP margin that would have been more than enough to make him premier with a clear majority in the rest of Australia.

Electoral legislation remained unchanged. Labor introduced bills for reform, but these were defeated in both houses of Parliament. Playford countered with electoral legislation that would have entrenched his government further than under the Playmander. As electoral legislation was written into the South Australian constitution, it required an absolute parliamentary majority (20 seats, under the current system) to be changed. With Stott keeping the LCL in office, Labor could obstruct changes by keeping members away and forcing a pair.

While his political position was becoming increasingly untenable, Playford himself continued with his work in building the state. Plans for Adelaide's future development, including a road transport plan, were commissioned. Playford saw a modern road transport system as crucial to continuing the industrialisation of the state, and motor vehicle registrations, which had increased by a factor of 50 since the end of the war, required road expansion. The Metropolitan Plan, a 1962 publication of the Town Planning Committee called for the construction of 56 km of freeways and speculated that three times as much would be needed in future. However, most of this never materialised; only the South Eastern Freeway was approved during Playford's term, and construction just after he left office. A more ambitious plan for a freeway system was commissioned, but the study was not completed until after Playford's departure and was scrapped by later governments due to widespread public objections to the proposed demolition of entire suburbs for interchanges. Playford was criticised for seeing roads only from an engineering and utilitarian standpoint and neglecting the social and community effects of such building. The state's population hit in the one million mark in 1963 and the Port Stanvac oil refinery was completed. Adelaide's water supply was increased and the pipeline from Morgan to Whyalla was duplicated.

=== Changing policy expectations ===
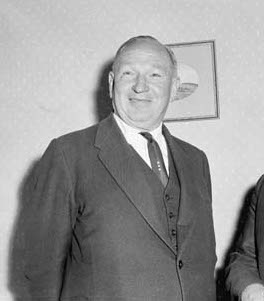
Playford in 1963, towards the end of his run in office.

The economic success of Playford's administration also fuelled the rapid growth of an immigrant, working and middle-class whose social expectations differed markedly from his traditionalist stance, loosening his grip on power. The demographic changes brought on by Playford's successful economic policies increased the number of people who had rather different views to his on matters such as education, health, arts, the environment, gambling and alcohol. Blewett and Jaensch said "it can be argued that the development he fostered ultimately brought about his own political demise." The state's social fabric became more complex, but Playford was unable or unwilling to adapt to their more complicated political desires.

Playford was known for his lack of funding for education, regarding it as a distraction from the industrialisation of the state. During this period, only the financial elite could afford a university education, and less than one percent of the population had a degree by the time Playford left office. Despite this, university attendance more than tripled, and secondary and technical school enrolments more than quintupled, far outstripping the 77% population growth during his time in office, as incomes—and hence access to education—rose steadily as the need for teenagers to find a job to help support the family declined. Although the government expenditure on education increased from 10 to 17% from 1945 to 1959, the number of teachers had only doubled by the time he left office, so class sizes increased. The premier's education policy was criticised for being too conservative and lacking in innovation. Playford also did not allow the teaching of languages other than English in schools on the grounds that "English is good enough". Howell said that Playford's "prejudices...served to limit the capacity of many able South Australians to participate in trade negotiations or diplomatic work." University academics and Public Examinations Board called for the inclusion of biology and the broadening of senior high school curriculum to better prepare students for tertiary education, but were rebuffed. In 1963 the minimum school leaving age was raised to 15, but this was still lower than most states in Australia.

The premier was also known for his suspicious attitude towards the University of Adelaide and tertiary education in general; many of their graduates moved interstate and he thought that scientific research done within the state was not sufficiently focussed on practical applications. The antipathy was mutual and originated from Playford's days as a backbencher, when he formally complained to the university about a lecture given by a political science professor about Marxism. Playford saw the discussion of such a topic as misuse of public funds for promotion of socialism, and his continued outspokenness about political curricula angered academics, who saw it as an attempt to curtail intellectual freedom. One vice-chancellor was angered to the point of telling a senior public servant that Playford "an uneducated country colonial". Playford also opposed the establishment of a second university in the state as the population increased. While academics thought that another institution would bring more academic diversity, Playford thought this would increase competition for resources, so he allowed only a new campus of the University of Adelaide, which became Flinders University after his departure from power. In his defence, Playford pointed that he had never rejected a funding request since the state took responsibility for universities in 1951, and that his proportional expenditure on tertiary education matched that of other states.

During Playford's rule, hospitals were overcrowded and the Royal Adelaide Hospital's beds were crammed together with a density twice higher than developed world standards. After a media exposé and criticism from health sector professionals, two more hospitals were built in the western and northern suburbs of Adelaide respectively. Playford's attitude to social welfare was also criticised. He said that it was up to charity, not the government, to support orphans and disadvantaged sectors of the community so that they could enjoy a better standard of living. Spending on social welfare lagged behind that in other states, and legislative reforms on this front were non-existent.

Arts, which Playford showed no personal interest in, and regarded as "frills not fundamentals" and "non-productive", became a more prominent issue among the emerging middle-class. For his attitude, Playford was often mocked by his opponents and critics for his "philistinism". The Nation derisorily quipped that "It is axiomatic that the Premier draws his orchard spray gun at the mention of the word 'culture'". Sir Arthur Rymill, an LCL member of the upper house, criticised the demolition of the Theatre Royal, lobbied Playford for increased funding without success, pointing out that world-class performing arts venues were generally subsidised by the government. Hurtle Morphett, a former State President of the LCL, quipped that if Playford "had wanted to convert the Art Gallery on North Terrace into a power house he would have done it without hesitation". In the 1960s, the Adelaide Festival started, while the Australian Dance Theatre and the State Theatre Company of South Australia was founded in the capital, with minimal assistance from Playford's government. The festival was well-received despite the effect of censorship in a state well known for social conservatism. With the success of the festival, public interest in arts increased, and with increasing calls for government funding, particularly from Dunstan, Playford finally agreed to fund the "non-productive area" in 1963 by allocating funding for the eventual building of the Festival Centre.

Playford's focus on development above all also led to controversy over heritage preservation. In 1955, the City of Adelaide legislated to rezone much of the city centre from residential to commercial land for office blocks. Many older houses, as well as the Exhibition Building were demolished, sparking calls by many parliamentarians, Dunstan prominent among them, for Playford to intercede to preserve the historic character of the city. The premier was unmoved, backing the redevelopment and claiming that many of the demolished structures were "substandard".

While Playford was known for his use of price controls to restrain the price of living and therefore attract blue-collar workers to settle in the state and fuel industrialisation, South Australia was slow to introduce consumer protection laws in regards to quality control. It was believed that he was opposed to compulsory pasteurisation and other quality standards on milk to avoid offending his rural support base. Playford's reluctance to introduce regulations for tradesmen such as builders, electricians and plumbers were often seen to have resulted from his being a keen do-it-yourself handyman.

The conservatism of the Liberal and Country League did not keep up with the expectations of a modern-day society. There was dissatisfaction with the restrictive drinking laws; environmentalists campaigned for more natural parks and more 'green' practices; police powers stood strong, 'no loitering' legislation remained in place; gambling was almost completely restricted. The constituents who loudly demanded changes were mostly immigrants and their offspring, used to more libertine conditions in their countries of origin. Their homes, usually built by the Housing Trust, sprawled into 'rural' electoral districts that were controlled by the League. Labor pledged to introduce social legislation to meet their demands; Playford, who did not drink, smoke or gamble, had no interest in doing so. His own candidates knew that the 1965 election would be unwinnable if Playford did not budge. The economy was still going strong and incomes were still increasing, so the Premier did not change his position on social reform.

== Fall from power ==
Playford went into the 1965 election confident that he would build upon his previous result. Labor was continuing its practice of concentrating on individual seats: this time the effort was invested in the electorates of Barossa and Glenelg. In Barossa, northern Adelaide urban sprawl was overflowing into an otherwise rural and conservative electorate; in Glenelg, a younger generation of professionals and their families were settling. On election day, 6 March, both seats fell to Labor with substantial swings. The LCL lost power for the first time in 35 years. In seats that were contested by both parties, Labor led on the primary vote with 52.7 to 43.3%. Playford stayed up on the night to see the result, and conceded defeat at midnight. He appeared calm when announcing the loss to the public, but wept when he told his family of it. Playford had been premier for 26 years and 126 days.

After the loss, there were calls for Playford to be offered the post of Governor of South Australia or Governor-General of Australia, but nothing came of that. Playford continued to lead the LCL opposition for a further one and a half years until he relinquished the leadership. In the subsequent ballot, Steele Hall, a small farmer like Playford, won and led the LCL to victory at the following election with the Playmander still in place. Contrary to perceptions, Playford was loath to favour or groom a successor, and he did not publicly hint at whom he voted for in the leadership ballot; there was speculation that the former premier may have been one of those who abstained from the vote. Playford retired from politics at the same time, presumably for reasons of age, but stated that "I couldn't cope with the change in the attitudes of some MPs, even some in the highest places... I found I could no longer cope with the change... I can't handle a liar who doesn't turn a hair while he's lying... I decided I couldn't take it any longer".

== Retirement and death ==
Playford retired from Parliament with a pension of $72 a week; he had resisted giving higher pensions to Ministers or longer-serving MPs throughout his tenure. Regardless of what people thought of the Playmander, Playford was held in high regard for his integrity; during his premiership, there were no complaints of corruption or government largesse. Playford also prohibited his ministers from sitting on the board of directors of public companies or owning shares, lest they became conflicted in their decision-making. He returned to his orchard at Norton Summit, and took a continued interest in South Australian politics, but did not typically raise his opinions publicly; he was still consulted in private by Liberals up until his death, however. His closeness to Labor figures did not end either, offering advice to their new South Australian ministers, and assisting in a memorial to the former Labor Prime Minister John Curtin. In line with his reputation for promoting his state, Playford also privately lobbied the Liberal government in Canberra on behalf of the state Labor administration for more infrastructure funding. In 1977, when Don Dunstan celebrated his 50th birthday party, Playford was the only Liberal invited. There he socialised with former and future Labor Prime Ministers Gough Whitlam and Bob Hawke, Dunstan, and other Laborites.

He served on the boards of the Electricity Trust and the Housing Trust, among others. Here, unused to not being in absolute control, and having little specific scientific knowledge, he occasionally stumbled in his decisions. This also created difficulties with the other board members, who were reluctant to disagree with their former boss, regardless of their expertise. But his thrift, a theme throughout his Premiership, did not abate; he was constantly forcing the trusts to use cost-saving methods and old vehicles for their work. This extended to his family property; he vigorously opposed his son's desire to install a new irrigation system in the orchard.

Playford had begun experiencing serious health problems since his first heart attack in June 1971, and underwent treatment and procedures for ten years. On 16 June 1981, he experienced a massive heart attack and died. Two days later his memorial service was held at the Flinders Street Baptist Church. The funeral procession carried his coffin from the city, along Magill and Old Norton Summit Roads where thousands turned out to pay their respects, to the Norton Summit cemetery where his forebears had been buried. There his gravestone was emblazoned with the phrase: 'a good man who did good things'.

== Recognition ==
Playford is memorialized in:

- The Sir Thomas Playford ETSA Museum, on former Electricity Trust grounds in Kurralta Park, is maintained by volunteers who are ex-employees of the government-controlled trust, and is open on most Tuesdays. Exhibits include technical equipment and vehicles from the era, and consumer products.

== See also ==
- Political families of Australia

== Select bibliography ==
- Abjorensen, Norman (2004). Leadership in the Liberal Party: Bolte, Askin and the Post-War Ascendency (Unpublished PhD thesis). The Australian National University.
- Blewett, Neal; Jaensch, Dean (1971). Playford to Dunstan: The Politics of Transition. Griffin Press Limited. ISBN 0-7015-1299-7.
- Cockburn, Stewart (1991). Playford: Benevolent Despot. Axiom Publishing. ISBN 0-9594164-4-7.
- Crocker, Walter (1983). Sir Thomas Playford: A Portrait. Melbourne University Press. ISBN 0-522-84250-X.
- Davis, Kevin; Maclean, Ian (1981). "Economic Policy". In Parkin, Andrew; Patience, Allan (eds.). The Dunstan decade: social democracy at the state level. Melbourne: Longman Cheshire. pp. 22–50. ISBN 0-582-71466-4.
- Donovan, Peter (1996). "Motor cars and freeways: measures of a South Australian love affair". In O'Neil, Bernard; Raftery, Judith; Round, Kerrie (eds.). Playford's South Australia: Essays on the History of South Australia, 1933–1968. Association of Professional Historians. pp. 201–214. ISBN 0-646-29092-4.
- Howell, P. A. (1996). "Playford, Politics, and Parliament". In O'Neil, Bernard; Raftery, Judith; Round, Kerrie (eds.). Playford's South Australia: Essays on the History of South Australia, 1933–1968. Association of Professional Historians. pp. 47–72. ISBN 0-646-29092-4.
- Hugo, Graeme (1996). "Playford's people: Population change in South Australia". In O'Neil, Bernard; Raftery, Judith; Round, Kerrie (eds.). Playford's South Australia: Essays on the History of South Australia, 1933–1968. Association of Professional Historians. pp. 29–46. ISBN 0-646-29092-4.
- Ioannou, Noris (1996). "Decline to revival: Decorative and applied arts". In O'Neil, Bernard; Raftery, Judith; Round, Kerrie (eds.). Playford's South Australia: Essays on the History of South Australia, 1933–1968. Association of Professional Historians. pp. 233–252. ISBN 0-646-29092-4.
- Jaensch, Dean (1986). The Flinders History of South Australia: Political History. Wakefield Press. ISBN 978-0-949268-52-5.
- Klaassen, Nic (1996). "The battle for Leigh Creek". In O'Neil, Bernard; Raftery, Judith; Round, Kerrie (eds.). Playford's South Australia: Essays on the History of South Australia, 1933–1968. Association of Professional Historians. pp. 135–154. ISBN 0-646-29092-4.
- Linn, Rob (2006). Those Turbulent Years: a history of the City of Adelaide. Adelaide City Council. ISBN 0-9750612-0-8.
- Marsden, Susan (1996). "Playford's metropolis". In O'Neil, Bernard; Raftery, Judith; Round, Kerrie (eds.). Playford's South Australia: Essays on the History of South Australia, 1933–1968. Association of Professional Historians. pp. 117–134. ISBN 0-646-29092-4.
- O'Neil, Bernard (1996). "'National heroes, not national villains': South Australia and the atomic age". In O'Neil, Bernard; Raftery, Judith; Round, Kerrie (eds.). Playford's South Australia: Essays on the History of South Australia, 1933–1968. Association of Professional Historians. pp. 155–176. ISBN 0-646-29092-4.
- Oxenberry, Rod (1981). "Economic Policy". In Parkin, Andrew; Patience, Allan (eds.). The Dunstan decade: social democracy at the state level. Melbourne: Longman Cheshire. pp. 51–69. ISBN 0-582-71466-4.
- Painter, Alison (1996). "Entertainment: the changing scene". In O'Neil, Bernard; Raftery, Judith; Round, Kerrie (eds.). Playford's South Australia: Essays on the History of South Australia, 1933–1968. Association of Professional Historians. pp. 295–318. ISBN 0-646-29092-4.
- Parkin, Andrew; Pugh, Cedric (1981). "Urban Policy and Metropolitan Adelaide". In Parkin, Andrew; Patience, Allan (eds.). The Dunstan decade: social democracy at the state level. Melbourne: Longman Cheshire. pp. 91–114. ISBN 0-582-71466-4.
- Rich, David C. (1996). "Tom's vision? Playford and industrialisation". In O'Neil, Bernard; Raftery, Judith; Round, Kerrie (eds.). Playford's South Australia: Essays on the History of South Australia, 1933–1968. Association of Professional Historians. pp. 91–116. ISBN 0-646-29092-4.
- Round, Kerrie (1996). "Preserving and celebrating South Australia's past". In O'Neil, Bernard; Raftery, Judith; Round, Kerrie (eds.). Playford's South Australia: Essays on the History of South Australia, 1933–1968. Association of Professional Historians. pp. 319–337. ISBN 0-646-29092-4.
- Summers, John (1986). "Aborigines and Government in the Twentieth Century". In Richards, Eric (ed.). The Flinders History of South Australia: Political History. Wakefield Press. ISBN 0-949268-54-2.
- Tilby Stock, Jenny (1996). "The 'Playmander': its origins, operations and effect on South Australia". In O'Neil, Bernard; Raftery, Judith; Round, Kerrie (eds.). Playford's South Australia: Essays on the History of South Australia, 1933–1968. Association of Professional Historians. pp. 73–90. ISBN 0-646-29092-4.

Political offices
Preceded by Richard Layton Butler	Premier of South Australia; 1938–1965	Succeeded by Frank Walsh
Preceded by Richard Layton Butler	Treasurer of South Australia; 1938–1965	Succeeded by Frank Walsh
Preceded by Reginald Rudall	Attorney-General of South Australia; 1955	Succeeded by Colin Rowe
Preceded by Frank Walsh	Leader of the Opposition of South Australia; 1965–1966	Succeeded by Steele Hall
Parliament of South Australia
Preceded by Frank Staniford	Member for Murray; 1933–1938; Served alongside: George Morphett, Howard Shannon	Succeeded by Richard McKenzie
New creation	Member for Gumeracha; 1938–1968	Succeeded by Bryant Giles
Party political offices
Preceded by Richard Layton Butler	Leader of the Liberal and Country League (SA); 1938–1966	Succeeded by Steele Hall
