= Electoral district of Stirling (South Australia) =

Former state electoral district in South Australia

Coordinates: 35°11′12″S 138°48′38″E

Stirling South Australia—House of Assembly
- State: South Australia
- Created: 1938
- Abolished: 1970
- Namesake: Stirling, South Australia
- Demographic: Rural

Stirling was an electoral district of the House of Assembly in the Australian state of South Australia from 1938 to 1970.

Stirling was superseded by the Electoral district of Heysen in a boundary redistribution for the 1970 election. William McAnaney was the first member of the new district.

== Members ==
Member	Party	Term
Herbert Dunn	Independent	1938–1940
Herbert Dunn	Liberal and Country	1940–1952
William Jenkins	Liberal and Country	1952–1963
William McAnaney	Liberal and Country	1963–1970
