= Electoral district of Gumeracha =

Former South Australian state electoral district (1857–1902, 1938–1970)

Gumeracha South Australia—House of Assembly
- State: South Australia
- Dates current: 1857–1902, 1938–1970
- Namesake: Gumeracha, South Australia
- Demographic: Rural
- Coordinates: 34°50′S 138°53′E

Gumeracha (spelt as Gumeracka from 1857 until 1860) was an electoral district of the House of Assembly in the Australian state of South Australia from 1857 to 1902 and again from 1938 to 1970.

Gumeracha's representative from March 1938 to March 1968, Thomas Playford IV, served continuously as Premier of South Australia from November 1938 to March 1965, the longest term of any elected government leader in the history of Australia. His record is controversial due to the Playmander helping his electoral successes.

== Members ==
First incarnation (1857–1902)
Member	Party	Term	Member	Party	Term
Arthur Blyth		1857–1868	Alexander Hay		1857–1861
Arthur Blyth		1857–1868	Alexander Murray		1862–1867
Arthur Blyth		1857–1868	Alexander Hay		1867–1870
William Sandover		1868–1870	Alexander Hay		1867–1870
Arthur Blyth		1870–1875	Ebenezer Ward		1870–1880
Frederick Hannaford		1875–1878	Ebenezer Ward		1870–1880
William Haines		1878–1884	Ebenezer Ward		1870–1880
William Haines		1878–1884	John Rounsevell		1880–1881
William Haines		1878–1884	Samuel Tomkinson		1881–1884
Robert Homburg		1884–1891	Robert Ross		1884–1887
Robert Homburg		1884–1891	Lancelot Stirling		1888–1890
Robert Homburg		1884–1891	Theodore Hack		1890–1893
Robert Homburg	Defence League	1891–1896	William Randell	Defence League	1893–1896
Robert Homburg	Defence League	1891–1896	Charles Willcox	Defence League	1896–1896
Robert Homburg		1896–1902	William Randell		1896–1899
Robert Homburg		1896–1902	Thomas Playford II		1899–1901
Robert Homburg		1896–1902	William Jamieson	National League	1901–1902

Second incarnation (1938–1970)
Member	Party	Term
Thomas Playford IV	Liberal and Country	1938–1968
Bryant Giles	Liberal and Country	1968–1970
