= Members of the South Australian Legislative Council, 1965–1968 =

This is a list of members of the South Australian Legislative Council from 1965 to 1968.

| Name | District | Party | Term expiry | Time in office |
|---|---|---|---|---|
| Don Banfield | Central No. 1 | Labor | 1973 | 1965–1979 |
| Stan Bevan | Central No. 1 | Labor | 1973 | 1951–1970 |
| Jessie Cooper | Central No. 2 | LCL | 1973 | 1959–1975 |
| Boyd Dawkins | Midland | LCL | 1968 | 1962–1982 |
| Ren DeGaris | Southern | LCL | 1973 | 1962–1985 |
| Leslie Harold Densley ^{[3]} | Southern | LCL | 1968 | 1944–1967 |
| Richard Geddes | Northern | LCL | 1973 | 1965–1979 |
| Gordon Gilfillan | Northern | LCL | 1968 | 1962–1975 |
| Les Hart | Midland | LCL | 1973 | 1962–1973 |
| Murray Hill ^{[1]} | Central No. 2 | LCL | 1968 | 1965–1988 |
| Sir Norman Jude | Southern | LCL | 1968 | 1944–1971 |
| Henry Kemp | Southern | LCL | 1973 | 1964–1973 |
| Alfred Kneebone | Central No. 1 | Labor | 1968 | 1961–1975 |
| Sir Lyell McEwin | Northern | LCL | 1968 | 1934–1975 |
| Dudley Octoman ^{[2]} | Northern | LCL | 1973 | 1965–1966 |
| Sir Frank Perry ^{[1]} | Central No. 2 | LCL | 1968 | 1947–1965 |
| Frank Potter | Central No. 2 | LCL | 1973 | 1959–1978 |
| Colin Rowe | Midland | LCL | 1973 | 1948–1970 |
| Sir Arthur Rymill | Central No. 2 | LCL | 1968 | 1956–1975 |
| Bert Shard | Central No. 1 | Labor | 1968 | 1956–1975 |
| Victor George Springett ^{[3]} | Southern | LCL | 1968 | 1967–1975 |
| Ross Story | Midland | LCL | 1968 | 1955–1975 |
| Arthur Whyte ^{[2]} | Northern | LCL | 1973 | 1966–1985 |

^{1} LCL MLC Sir Frank Perry died on 20 October 1965. Murray Hill was elected to fill the vacancy on 4 December.
^{2} LCL MLC Dudley Octoman died on 11 September 1966. Arthur Whyte was elected to fill the vacancy on 29 October.
^{3} LCL MLC Leslie Harold Densley resigned on 24 April 1967. Victor George Springett was elected to fill the vacancy on 2 June.
