= Members of the South Australian Legislative Council, 1968–1970 =

This is a list of members of the South Australian Legislative Council from 1968 to 1970.

| Name | District | Party | Term expiry | Time in office |
|---|---|---|---|---|
| Don Banfield | Central No. 1 | Labor | 1973 | 1965–1979 |
| Stan Bevan ^{[1]} | Central No. 1 | Labor | 1973 | 1951–1970 |
| Tom Casey ^{[1]} | Central No. 1 | Labor | 1973 | 1970–1979 |
| Jessie Cooper | Central No. 2 | LCL | 1973 | 1959–1975 |
| Boyd Dawkins | Midland | LCL | 1975 | 1962–1982 |
| Ren DeGaris | Southern | LCL | 1973 | 1962–1985 |
| Richard Geddes | Northern | LCL | 1973 | 1965–1979 |
| Gordon Gilfillan | Northern | LCL | 1975 | 1962–1975 |
| Les Hart | Midland | LCL | 1973 | 1962–1973 |
| Murray Hill | Central No. 2 | LCL | 1975 | 1965–1988 |
| Norman Jude | Southern | LCL | 1975 | 1944–1971 |
| Henry Kemp | Southern | LCL | 1973 | 1964–1973 |
| Alfred Kneebone | Central No. 1 | Labor | 1975 | 1961–1975 |
| Sir Lyell McEwin | Northern | LCL | 1975 | 1934–1975 |
| Frank Potter | Central No. 2 | LCL | 1973 | 1959–1978 |
| Colin Rowe | Midland | LCL | 1973 | 1948–1970 |
| Sir Arthur Rymill | Central No. 2 | LCL | 1975 | 1956–1975 |
| Bert Shard | Central No. 1 | Labor | 1975 | 1956–1975 |
| Victor George Springett | Southern | LCL | 1975 | 1967–1975 |
| Ross Story | Midland | LCL | 1975 | 1955–1975 |
| Arthur Whyte | Northern | LCL | 1973 | 1966–1985 |

^{1} Labor MLC Stan Bevan resigned on 4 May 1970. Tom Casey was elected to fill the vacancy on 15 May.
