= Members of the South Australian Legislative Council, 1970–1973 =

This is a list of members of the South Australian Legislative Council from 1970 to 1973.

Name	District	Party	Term expiry	Time in office
Don Banfield	Central No. 1	Labor	1973	1965–1979
Martin Cameron ^{[2]}	Southern	LCL	1975	1971–1990
Tom Casey	Central No. 1	Labor	1973	1970–1979
Jessie Cooper	Central No. 2	LCL	1973	1959–1975
Boyd Dawkins	Midland	LCL	1975	1962–1982
Ren DeGaris	Southern	LCL	1973	1962–1985
Richard Geddes	Northern	LCL	1973	1965–1979
Gordon Gilfillan	Northern	LCL	1975	1962–1975
Les Hart	Midland	LCL	1973	1962–1973
Murray Hill	Central No. 2	LCL	1975	1965–1988
Sir Norman Jude ^{[2]}	Southern	LCL	1975	1944–1971
Henry Kemp	Southern	LCL	1973	1964–1973
Alfred Kneebone	Central No. 1	Labor	1975	1961–1975
Sir Lyell McEwin	Northern	LCL	1975	1934–1975
Frank Potter	Central No. 2	LCL	1973	1959–1978
Colin Rowe ^{[1]}	Midland	LCL	1973	1948–1970
Keith Russack ^{[1]}	Midland	LCL	1973	1970–1973
Sir Arthur Rymill	Central No. 2	LCL	1975	1956–1975
Bert Shard	Central No. 1	Labor	1975	1956–1975
Victor George Springett	Southern	LCL	1975	1967–1975
Ross Story	Midland	LCL	1975	1955–1975
Arthur Whyte	Northern	LCL	1973	1966–1985

^{1} LCL MLC Colin Rowe died on 2 August 1970. Keith Russack was elected to fill the vacancy on 12 September.
^{2} LCL MLC Sir Norman Jude resigned on 17 June 1971. Martin Cameron was elected to fill the vacancy on 3 July.
