= Results of the 1975 South Australian state election (Legislative Council) =

South Australian state election, 12 July, 1975 Legislative Council << 1973–1979 >>
| Enrolled voters | 771,414 | | | | |
| Votes cast | 719,753 | | Turnout | 93.3 | –0.6 |
| Informal votes | 32,690 | | Informal | 4.5 | –4.8 |
Summary of votes by party
| Party | Primary votes | % | Swing | Seats won | Seats held |
| Labor | 324,744 | 47.3 | –5.3 | 6 | 10 |
| Liberal | 191,341 | 27.8 | –18.4 | 3 | 9 |
| Liberal Movement | 129,110 | 18.8 | +18.8 | 2 | 2 |
| National | 14,640 | 2.1 | +2.1 | 0 | 0 |
| Family Movement | 9,966 | 1.5 | +1.5 | 0 | 0 |
| Free Enterprise Group | 8,141 | 1.2 | +1.2 | 0 | 0 |
| Socialist | 4,273 | 0.6 | +0.6 | 0 | 0 |
| Australia | 3,822 | 0.6 | –0.2 | 0 | 0 |
| Other | 1,026 | 0.1 | * | 0 | 0 |
| Total | 687,063 | | | 11 | 21 |

This is a list of results for the Legislative Council at the 1975 South Australian state election.

== Continuing members ==
The following MLCs were not up for re-election this year.

| Member | Party | Term |
|---|---|---|
| John Burdett | Liberal | 1973–1979 |
| Jessie Cooper | Liberal | 1973–1979 |
| Ren DeGaris | Liberal | 1973–1979 |
| Richard Geddes | Liberal | 1973–1979 |
| Frank Potter | Liberal | 1973–1979 |
| Arthur Whyte | Liberal | 1973–1979 |
| Don Banfield | Labor | 1973–1979 |
| Tom Casey | Labor | 1973–1979 |
| Brian Chatterton | Labor | 1973–1979 |
| Cec Creedon | Labor | 1973–1979 |

== Election results ==
1975 South Australian state election: Legislative Council
| Party | Candidate | Votes | % | ±% |
|---|---|---|---|---|
| Quota | | 57,058 | | |
| Labor | 1. Norm Foster (elected); 2. Jim Dunford (elected); 3. Anne Levy (elected); 4. Frank Blevins (elected); 5. John Cornwall (elected); 6. Chris Sumner (elected); 7. Terry Hemmings | 324,744 | 47.3 | −5.3 |
| Liberal | 1. Murray Hill (elected); 2. Don Laidlaw (elected); 3. Boyd Dawkins (elected); 4. Gordon Gilfillan; 5. Graham Hancock; 6. Judith Roberts; 7. Ross Story | 191,341 | 27.8 | −18.4 |
| Liberal Movement | 1. Martin Cameron (elected); 2. John Carnie (elected); 3. Richard Clampett; 4. Charles Groves; 5. Janine Haines; 6. Peter Adamson | 129,110 | 18.8 | +18.8 |
| National | 1. Lester James; 2. Richard Morris; 3. George Olesnicky | 14,640 | 2.1 | +2.1 |
| Family Movement | 1. John Court; 2. Raymond Kidney | 9,966 | 1.5 | +1.5 |
| Free Enterprise Group | 1. Marcus Dodd; 2. William Forster; 3. Robert Hill; 4. Frederick Koop | 8,141 | 1.2 | +1.2 |
| Socialist | Alan Miller | 4,273 | 0.6 | +0.6 |
| Australia | 1. Mark Lainio; 2. David Middleton; 3. Colyn Van Reenen | 3,822 | 0.6 | −0.2 |
| Independent | Mark Higgs | 1,026 | 0.1 | +0.1 |
| Total formal votes | | 687,063 | 95.5 | +4.8 |
| Informal votes | | 32,690 | 4.5 | −4.8 |
| Turnout | | 719,753 | 93.3 | −0.6 |

== See also ==
- 1975 South Australian state election
- Candidates of the 1975 South Australian state election
- Members of the South Australian Legislative Council, 1975–1979
