= Members of the South Australian Legislative Council, 1962–1965 =

This is a list of members of the South Australian Legislative Council from 1962 to 1965.

Name	District	Party	Term expires	Time in office
Ken Bardolph ^{[4]}	Central No. 1	Labor	1965	1941–1964
Stan Bevan	Central No. 1	Labor	1965	1951–1970
Jessie Cooper	Central No. 2	LCL	1965	1959–1975
Boyd Dawkins	Midland	LCL	1968	1962–1982
Ren DeGaris ^{[2]}	Southern	LCL	1965	1962–1985
Leslie Harold Densley	Southern	LCL	1968	1944–1967
Geoffrey Giles ^{[3]}	Southern	LCL	1965	1959–1964
Gordon Gilfillan	Northern	LCL	1968	1962–1975
Les Hart ^{[1]}	Midland	LCL	1965	1962–1973
Allan Hookings ^{[2]}	Southern	LCL	1965	1959–1962
Norman Jude	Southern	LCL	1968	1944–1971
Henry Kemp ^{[3]}	Southern	LCL	1965	1964–1973
Alfred Kneebone	Central No. 1	Labor	1968	1961–1975
Sir Lyell McEwin	Northern	LCL	1968	1934–1975
Alexander Melrose ^{[1]}	Midland	LCL	1965	1941–1962
Sir Frank Perry	Central No. 2	LCL	1968	1947–1965
Frank Potter	Central No. 2	LCL	1965	1959–1978
William Walsh Robinson	Northern	LCL	1965	1953–1965
Colin Rowe	Midland	LCL	1965	1948–1970
Sir Arthur Rymill	Central No. 2	LCL	1968	1956–1975
Bert Shard	Central No. 1	Labor	1968	1956–1975
Ross Story	Midland	LCL	1968	1955–1975
Robert Richard Wilson	Northern	LCL	1965	1949–1965

^{1} LCL MLC Alexander Melrose died on 6 September 1962. Les Hart was elected to fill the vacancy on 20 October.
^{2} LCL MLC Allan Hookings died on 31 October 1962. Ren DeGaris was elected to fill the vacancy on 15 December.
^{3} LCL MLC Geoffrey Giles resigned on 13 May 1964. Henry Kemp was elected to fill the vacancy on 19 June.
^{4} Labor MLC Ken Bardolph died on 9 November 1964. The vacancy was not filled before the March 1965 election.
