= Members of the South Australian Legislative Council, 1973–1975 =

This is a list of members of the South Australian Legislative Council from 1973 to 1975.

Name	District	Party	Term expires	Time in office
Don Banfield	Central No. 1	Labor	1979	1965–1979
John Burdett ^{[1]}	Southern	Liberal	1979	1973–1993
Martin Cameron	Southern	Liberal Movement	1975	1971–1990
Tom Casey	Central No. 1	Labor	1979	1970–1979
Brian Chatterton	Midland	Labor	1979	1973–1987
Jessie Cooper	Central No. 2	Liberal	1979	1959–1975
Cec Creedon	Midland	Labor	1979	1973–1985
Boyd Dawkins	Midland	Liberal	1975	1962–1982
Ren DeGaris	Southern	Liberal	1979	1962–1985
Richard Geddes	Northern	Liberal	1979	1965–1979
Gordon Gilfillan	Northern	Liberal	1975	1962–1975
Murray Hill	Central No. 2	Liberal	1975	1965–1988
Henry Kemp ^{[1]}	Southern	Liberal	1979	1964–1973
Frank Kneebone	Central No. 1	Labor	1975	1961–1975
Sir Lyell McEwin	Northern	Liberal	1975	1934–1975
Frank Potter	Central No. 2	Liberal	1979	1959–1978
Sir Arthur Rymill	Central No. 2	Liberal	1975	1956–1975
Bert Shard	Central No. 1	Labor	1975	1956–1975
Victor George Springett	Southern	Liberal	1975	1967–1975
Ross Story	Midland	Liberal	1975	1955–1975
Arthur Whyte	Northern	Liberal	1979	1966–1985

^{1} LCL MLC Henry Kemp died on 29 June 1973. John Burdett was elected to fill the vacancy on 11 August.
