= Members of the South Australian Legislative Council, 1975–1979 =

This is a list of members of the South Australian Legislative Council from 1975 to 1979.

Party	Seats held	1975–1979 Council
Australian Labor Party	10	
Liberal Party of Australia	9	
Liberal Movement	2	

This period operated under transitional arrangements following the rearrangement of the Council from a restricted-franchise house with ten provinces each electing two members, to a 22-member house elected to staggered terms on an open franchise, proportional representation model. Due in part to a constitutional requirement that those elected at the 1973 election serve six-year terms, the next Council election was in 1979 even though the next Assembly election was held in 1977.

Name	Party	Term expiry	Term of office
Don Banfield	Labor	1979	1965–1979
Frank Blevins	Labor	1982	1975–1985
John Burdett	Liberal	1979	1973–1993
Martin Cameron	LM/Liberal	1982	1971–1990
John Carnie	LM/Liberal	1982	1975–1982
Tom Casey	Labor	1979	1970–1979
Brian Chatterton	Labor	1979	1973–1987
Jessie Cooper	Liberal	1979	1959–1979
Dr John Cornwall	Labor	1982	1975–1989
Cecil Creedon	Labor	1979	1973–1985
Boyd Dawkins	Liberal	1982	1962–1982
Ren DeGaris	Liberal	1979	1962–1985
Jim Dunford	Labor	1982	1975–1982
Norm Foster	Labor	1982	1975–1982
Richard Geddes	Liberal	1979	1965–1979
Trevor Griffin ^{[1]}	Liberal	1979	1978–2002
Murray Hill	Liberal	1982	1965–1988
Don Laidlaw	Liberal	1982	1975–1982
Anne Levy	Labor	1982	1975–1997
Frank Potter ^{[1]}	Liberal	1979	1959–1978
Chris Sumner	Labor	1982	1975–1994
Arthur Whyte	Liberal	1979	1966–1985

^{1} Liberal MLC Frank Potter died on 26 February 1978. Trevor Griffin was appointed to the resulting casual vacancy on 7 March 1978.
