= Results of the 1973 South Australian state election (Legislative Council) =

1973 SA Legislative Council election

South Australian state election, 10 March, 1973 Legislative Council << 1968–1975 >>
Enrolled voters	383,758				
Votes cast	357,971		Turnout	93.3	–1.9
Informal votes	27,140		Informal	7.6	+1.7
Summary of votes by party
Party	Primary votes	%	Swing	Seats won	Seats held
Labor	174,082	52.6	–5.3	4	6
Liberal and Country	152,921	46.2	+4.2	6	14
Australia	2,618	0.8	+0.8	0	0
Independent	1,210	0.4	+0.4	0	0
Total	330,831			10	20

This is a list of results for the Legislative Council at the 1973 South Australian state election.

== Results by District ==
=== Central No. 1 ===
1973 South Australian state election: Central District No. 1
Party	Candidate	Votes	%	±%
Labor	Don Banfield (elected)	57,873	63.9	
Labor	Tom Casey (elected)	3,130	3.5	
Liberal and Country	Iris MacDonald	27,563	30.4	
Liberal and Country	Lois Bell	2,002	2.2	
Total formal votes		90,568	90.7	−0.7
Informal votes		9,228	9.3	+0.7
Turnout		99,976	93.9	+0.1
Party total votes
Labor		61,003	67.4	−16.1
Liberal and Country		29,565	32.6	+32.6

=== Central No. 2 ===
1973 South Australian state election: Central District No. 2
Party	Candidate	Votes	%	±%
Liberal and Country	Frank Potter (elected)	39,749	48.0	
Liberal and Country	Jessie Cooper (elected)	1,856	2.2	
Labor	Mary Brannigan	37,240	45.0	
Labor	Ronald Lock	1,300	1.6	
Australia	Richard Grove	2,112	2.6	
Australia	Colin Miller	506	0.6	
Total formal votes		82,763	92.5	−2.3
Informal votes		6,690	7.5	+2.3
Turnout		89,453	93.7	−1.8
Party total votes
Liberal and Country		41,605	50.3	−6.6
Labor		38,540	46.6	+5.9
Australia		2,618	3.2	+3.2

=== Midland ===
1973 South Australian state election: Midland District
Party	Candidate	Votes	%	±%
Labor	Cec Creedon (elected)	31,786	52.3	
Labor	Brian Chatterton (elected)	2,017	3.3	
Liberal and Country	John Freebairn	23,216	38.2	
Liberal and Country	Les Hart	3,803	6.3	
Total formal votes		60,822	93.3	−1.8
Informal votes		4,357	6.7	+1.8
Turnout		65,179	93.5	−2.1
Party total votes
Labor		33,803	55.6	+8.9
Liberal and Country		27,019	44.4	−8.9

=== Northern ===
1973 South Australian state election: Northern District
Party	Candidate	Votes	%	±%
Liberal and Country	Richard Geddes (elected)	19,667	45.4	
Liberal and Country	Arthur Whyte (elected)	2,988	6.9	
Labor	Frank Blevins	19,159	44.2	
Labor	John Phelan	1,515	3.5	
Total formal votes		43,329	93.4	−2.2
Informal votes		3,038	6.6	+2.2
Turnout		46,367	91.4	−6.4
Party total votes
Liberal and Country		22,655	52.3	−8.4
Labor		20,674	47.7	+8.4

=== Southern ===
1973 South Australian state election: Southern District
Party	Candidate	Votes	%	±%
Liberal and Country	Ren DeGaris (elected)	30,263	56.7	
Liberal and Country	Henry Kemp (elected)	1,814	3.4	
Labor	Dennis Beager	18,355	34.4	
Labor	James Hennessy	1,707	3.2	
Independent	John Gartner	1,210	2.3	
Total formal votes		53,349	93.3	−2.0
Informal votes		3,827	6.7	+2.0
Turnout		57,176	92.9	−1.5
Party total votes
Liberal and Country		32,077	60.1	−4.3
Labor		20,062	37.6	+2.0
Independent	John Gartner	1,210	2.3	+2.3

== See also ==
- 1973 South Australian state election
- Candidates of the 1973 South Australian state election
- Members of the South Australian Legislative Council, 1973–1975
