= Members of the South Australian Legislative Council, 1959–1962 =

This is a list of members of the South Australian Legislative Council from 1959 to 1962.

Name	District	Party	Term expiry	Time in office
Ken Bardolph	Central No. 1	Labor	1965	1941–1964
Stan Bevan	Central No. 1	Labor	1965	1951–1970
Frank Condon ^{[1]}	Central No. 1	Labor	1962	1928–1961
Jessie Cooper	Central No. 2	LCL	1965	1959–1975
Leslie Harold Densley	Southern	LCL	1962	1944–1967
Sir Walter Gordon Duncan	Midland	LCL	1962	1918–1962
Harry Edmonds	Northern	LCL	1962	1944–1962
Geoffrey Giles	Southern	LCL	1965	1959–1964
Allan Hookings	Southern	LCL	1965	1959–1962
Norman Jude	Southern	LCL	1962	1944–1971
Alfred Kneebone ^{[1]}	Central No. 1	Labor	1962	1961–1975
Sir Lyell McEwin	Northern	LCL	1962	1934–1975
Alexander Melrose	Midland	LCL	1965	1941–1962
Sir Frank Perry	Central No. 2	LCL	1962	1947–1965
Frank Potter	Central No. 2	LCL	1965	1959–1978
William Walsh Robinson	Northern	LCL	1965	1953–1965
Colin Rowe	Midland	LCL	1965	1948–1970
Sir Arthur Rymill	Central No. 2	LCL	1962	1956–1975
Bert Shard	Central No. 1	Labor	1962	1956–1975
Ross Story	Midland	LCL	1962	1955–1975
Robert Richard Wilson	Northern	LCL	1965	1949–1965

^{1} Labor MLC Frank Condon died on 15 July 1961. Alfred Kneebone was elected to fill the vacancy on 16 September.
