= Candidates of the 1965 South Australian state election =

The 1965 South Australian state election was held on 6 March 1965.

== Retiring Members ==
=== Labor ===
- Fred Walsh, MHA (West Torrens)

=== Liberal and Country ===
- Leslie Harding, MHA (Victoria)
- Robert Wilson, MLC (Northern District)
- William Robinson, MLC (Northern District)

== House of Assembly ==
Sitting members are shown in bold text. Successful candidates are highlighted in the relevant colour. Where there is possible confusion, an asterisk (*) is also used.

Electorate	Held by	Labor candidate	LCL candidate	DLP candidate	Other candidates
Adelaide	Labor	**Sam Lawn**		George Basivovs	Elliott Johnston (Comm); Thomas Ellis (Soc. Credit)
Albert	LCL		**Bill Nankivell**		
Alexandra	LCL	Desmond Merton	**David Brookman**		
Angas	LCL		**Berthold Teusner**		
Barossa	LCL	Molly Byrne	**Condor Laucke**	Andrew Shore	David Wood (Soc. Credit)
Burnside	LCL	Joyce Henriott	**Joyce Steele**		William Carruthers (Soc. Credit)
Burra	Independent	John Phelan	**Percy Quirke**		
Chaffey	Labor	**Reg Curren**	Harold King	William Ahern	Herbert Wilson (Ind.)
Edwardstown	Labor	**Frank Walsh**	Laurence Daly	Allan Anderson	Brian Waters (Ind.)
Enfield	Labor	**Jack Jennings**	Allan Stock	Desmond Timlin	Alan Miller (Comm); David Beavan (Soc. Credit)
Eyre	LCL	Isaac Rayson	**George Bockelberg**		Harold Schiller (CP)
Flinders	LCL	James Hudson	**Glen Pearson**	Douglas Barnes	
Frome	Labor	**Tom Casey**	Maxwell Hams	John McMahon	
Gawler	Labor	**John Clark**	Phillip Hockey		Desmond Clark (Ind.); John Fielder (Ind.)
Glenelg	LCL	Hugh Hudson	**Baden Pattinson**	Mark Posa	
Gouger	LCL	Robert Thredgold	**Steele Hall**		
Gumeracha	LCL	Ernie Crimes	**Thomas Playford**	Patrick Coffey	Marcus Dodd (Soc. Credit); Brian Rooney (Comm)
Hindmarsh	Labor	**Cyril Hutchens**		Cyril Holasek	
Light	LCL		**John Freebairn**		
Millicent	Labor	**Des Corcoran**	John Osborne		
Mitcham	LCL	Murty Conlon	**Robin Millhouse**		Ernst Hergstrom (Soc. Credit)
Mount Gambier	Labor	**Allan Burdon**	Mary Hill		
Murray	Labor	**Gabe Bywaters**	Eric Doecke		
Norwood	Labor	**Don Dunstan**	Sidney Daws		
Onkaparinga	LCL	Frank Staniford	**Howard Shannon**		Harvey Burns (Soc. Credit)
Port Adelaide	Labor	**John Ryan**		Donald Boys	Peter Symon (Comm)
Port Pirie	Labor	**Dave McKee**			Allan Mossop (Ind.)
Ridley	Independent	Arnold Busbridge			**Tom Stott** (Ind.)
Rocky River	LCL	George Smart	**James Heaslip**		
Semaphore	Labor	**Reg Hurst**		Charles Coffey	George Heritage (Soc. Credit)
Stirling	LCL	Allan Stevens	**William McAnaney**		
Stuart	Labor	**Lindsay Riches**			William Young (Ind.)
Torrens	LCL	Chris Hurford	**John Coumbe**	Charles Bradley	Russell Sellars (Soc. Credit)
Unley	Labor	**Gil Langley**	John McLeay	Mary Dempsey	John Hennessey (Ind.); William Wallace (Ind.)
Victoria	LCL	David Walker	Allan Rodda		James McLachlan (CP); John Gartner (Ind.)
Wallaroo	Labor	**Lloyd Hughes**	Clarence Green		
West Torrens	Labor	Glen Broomhill	Parker Morton		
Whyalla	Labor	**Ron Loveday**		Gordon Kimpton	Clarence Young (Ind.); James Yates (Ind.)
Yorke Peninsula	LCL	Michael Kennedy	**James Ferguson**		

== Legislative Council ==
Sitting members are shown in bold text. Successful candidates are highlighted in the relevant colour and identified by an asterisk (*).

District	Held by	Labor candidates	LCL candidates	Other candidates
Central No. 1	2 Labor	**Stan Bevan***; Don Banfield*		Edward Timlin (DLP); William Gold (Ind.); Edwin Burnett-Read (Ind.)
Central No. 2	2 LCL	Robert Millar; Eric Thorp	**Jessie Cooper***; **Frank Potter***	
Midland	2 LCL	Donald MacLeod; Leonard Krieg	**Les Hart***; **Colin Rowe***	
Northern	2 LCL	Hugh James; Miah O'Callaghan	Richard Geddes*; Dudley Octoman*	
Southern	2 LCL		**Ren DeGaris***; **Henry Kemp***	
