= Samuel Perry (ironmaster) =

Samuel Perry was an industrialist in the State of South Australia.

== History ==
Samuel Perry (c.1864 – 19 March 1930) was the son of John and Harriett Perry (ca.1834 – 24 September 1918) of Shropshire, England, and the brother of Rev. Isaiah Perry (1854–1911). He was apprenticed as an iron worker to the Coalbrookdale Company, where he trained as an engineer. At the age of 22, around 1886, he followed his brother to Gawler, South Australia, where he found employment at James Martin's "Phoenix Foundry", living with the Roediger family at nearby Buchfelde (later named Loos). He next worked at Port Adelaide, then as foreman for John Danks & Son of Melbourne. He returned to Adelaide and started his own business with the purchase of James Wedlock's "Cornwall Foundry", the transfer of that factory to new premises Perry Engineering at Mile End, and the purchase of the James Martin & Co. workshops in Gawler. He took on his nephew Frank Perry, who became managing director and company chairman on his death.

He married Mary Jane Rofe (died 9 August 1924) of Port Adelaide on 7 March 1894; they had a daughter, and lived at "Brier Holme" at Grove Street, Unley Park. He was a member of the Royal SA Yacht Squadron; his motor yacht Isis was the largest in South Australia.

== Family ==
John Perry and Harriett Perry (c. 1834 – 24 September 1918) of Shropshire, England, had two sons who emigrated to South Australia:

- Rev. Isaiah Perry (c. 1854 – 30 November 1911) born at Lawley Bank, Dawley, Shropshire, married Caroline Marie Pauline Roediger (1956) on 8 October 1884

- John Shrewsbury Perry (1885– ) married Agnes Jean Barkley (died 1926) in 1914
- Frank Tennyson Perry (1887–1965) married Hildegard Therese "Hilda" Matschoss (1889–1981) in 1911

- Frank Spencer Perry (9 September 1913 – 7 August 1951) married Margaret Florence "Peg" Collin (1915–2004) on 20 April 1940. They had two sons, Frank Timothy Collin Perry, and Samuel Perry born on 14 April 1942 and 1 May 1950; lived at 2 College Street, College Park. Frank Jr's death was not mentioned in the newspapers. Frank Timothy Collin Perry III married Jillian Kaye Hammond and had two children Andrew Tennyson born 2 November 1969, and Lachlan Hammond Perry born 24 October 1971. Margaret married again, to Gilbert William Ward Griffith (died 1956) on 8 November 1952.
- Margaret Pauline "Peg" Perry (18 July 1917 – ) married John Macke Gebhardt (1908–1966) on 17 October 1936.
- (Audrey) Vivienne Perry LLB (29 July 1925 – ) married Donald Hope Laidlaw on 2 February 1948. Their eldest daughter Diana Laidlaw was a noted state politician.

- Rev. Charles Julius Perry (1888–1961) Methodist minister and Australian Rules footballer
- Albert Perry
- Nellie Perry

- Samuel Perry (1865–1930) married Mary Jane Rofe (1858 – 9 August 1924) on 7 March 1894, lived at "Brier Holme" Grove Street Unley Park

- Vera May Perry (1902–1988)
