= Results of the 1973 South Australian state election (House of Assembly) =

South Australian state election, 10 March 1973 House of Assembly << 1970–1975 >>
Enrolled voters	696,290				
Votes cast	655,937		Turnout	94.20%	-0.83%
Informal votes	26,794		Informal	4.08%	+2.02%
Summary of votes by party
Party	Primary votes	%	Swing	Seats	Change
Labor	324,135	51.52%	–0.12%	26	1
Liberal and Country	250,312	39.79%	–3.97%	20	± 0
Country	24,810	3.94%	+2.05%	1	+ 1
Independent	27,178	4.32%	+2.86%	0	± 0
Other	2,708	0.43%	*	0	± 0
Total	629,143			47	
Two-party-preferred
Labor		54.50%	+1.20%		
Liberal and Country		45.50%	–1.20%		

This is a list of House of Assembly results for the 1973 South Australian state election.

== Results by electoral district ==
=== Adelaide ===
1973 South Australian state election: Adelaide
Party	Candidate	Votes	%	±%
Labor	Jack Wright	9,792	66.7	+3.8
Liberal and Country	Milton Blake	4,892	33.3	+1.1
Total formal votes		14,684	94.6	−2.4
Informal votes		840	5.4	+2.4
Turnout		15,524	92.9	−0.8
Labor hold		Swing	−0.6	

=== Albert Park ===
1973 South Australian state election: Albert Park
Party	Candidate	Votes	%	±%
Labor	Charles Harrison	10,716	71.7	+3.7
Liberal and Country	Valentine Dignum	4,236	28.3	−3.7
Total formal votes		14,952	94.5	−2.6
Informal votes		870	5.5	+2.6
Turnout		15,822	94.9	−0.5
Labor hold		Swing	+3.7	

=== Alexandra ===
1973 South Australian state election: Alexandra
Party	Candidate	Votes	%	±%
Liberal and Country	Ted Chapman	5,229	50.3	−9.7
Country	Lester James	3,523	33.9	+33.9
Independent	David Baines	1,642	15.8	+15.8
Total formal votes		10,394	95.1	−3.7
Informal votes		536	4.9	+3.7
Turnout		10,930	95.5	+1.5
Two-candidate-preferred result
Liberal and Country	Ted Chapman	6,050	58.2	−9.8
Country	Lester James	4,344	41.8	+41.8
Liberal and Country hold		Swing	N/A	

=== Ascot Park ===
1973 South Australian state election: Ascot Park
Party	Candidate	Votes	%	±%
Labor	Geoff Virgo	9,685	64.7	+1.5
Liberal and Country	John Forgan	5,289	35.3	−1.5
Total formal votes		14,974	96.7	−1.7
Informal votes		506	3.3	+1.7
Turnout		15,480	94.8	−1.2
Labor hold		Swing	+1.5	

=== Bragg ===
1973 South Australian state election: Bragg
Party	Candidate	Votes	%	±%
Liberal and Country	David Tonkin	9,619	66.4	−0.5
Labor	Florence Pens	4,863	33.6	+0.5
Total formal votes		14,482	97.3	−1.0
Informal votes		398	2.7	+1.0
Turnout		14,880	93.5	−0.1
Liberal and Country hold		Swing	−0.5	

=== Brighton ===
1973 South Australian state election: Brighton
Party	Candidate	Votes	%	±%
Labor	Hugh Hudson	10,099	60.1	+6.2
Liberal and Country	Ronald Moulds	6,045	36.0	−6.5
Independent	Betty Preston	656	3.9	+3.9
Total formal votes		16,800	98.1	−0.7
Informal votes		333	1.9	+0.7
Turnout		17,133	94.9	−1.2
Two-party-preferred result
Labor	Hugh Hudson	10,416	62.0	+7.5
Liberal and Country	Ronald Moulds	6,384	38.0	−7.5
Labor hold		Swing	+7.5	

=== Chaffey ===
1973 South Australian state election: Chaffey
Party	Candidate	Votes	%	±%
Liberal and Country	Peter Arnold	5,561	53.5	+13.4
Labor	Reg Curren	4,830	46.5	+2.2
Total formal votes		10,391	97.8	−0.5
Informal votes		233	2.2	+0.5
Turnout		10,624	95.2	−1.1
Liberal and Country gain from Labor		Swing	+3.7	

=== Coles ===
1973 South Australian state election: Coles
Party	Candidate	Votes	%	±%
Labor	Len King	10,341	59.2	+4.7
Liberal and Country	Graeme Sargent	7,116	40.8	−1.9
Total formal votes		17,457	96.7	−1.4
Informal votes		589	3.3	+1.4
Turnout		18,046	95.4	−1.6
Labor hold		Swing	+4.3	

=== Davenport ===
1973 South Australian state election: Davenport
Party	Candidate	Votes	%	±%
Liberal and Country	Dean Brown	11,082	68.2	+0.2
Labor	Graham Jamieson	5,176	31.8	−0.2
Total formal votes		16,258	97.5	−0.7
Informal votes		419	2.5	+0.7
Turnout		16,677	94.0	−1.0
Liberal and Country hold		Swing	+0.2	

=== Elizabeth ===
1973 South Australian state election: Elizabeth
Party	Candidate	Votes	%	±%
Labor	Peter Duncan	9,904	65.0	+1.3
Liberal and Country	Brian Marsden	3,247	21.3	−9.6
Independent	Fred Smith	1,617	10.6	+10.6
Independent	Nick Bolkus	476	3.1	+3.1
Total formal votes		15,244	96.1	−1.7
Informal votes		622	3.9	+1.7
Turnout		15,866	91.5	−0.2
Two-party-preferred result
Labor	Peter Duncan	10,610	69.6	+3.2
Liberal and Country	Brian Marsden	4,634	30.4	−3.2
Labor hold		Swing	+3.2	

=== Eyre ===
1973 South Australian state election: Eyre
Party	Candidate	Votes	%	±%
Liberal and Country	Graham Gunn	5,848	72.6	+16.5
Labor	Peter Kennedy	2,202	27.4	−5.8
Total formal votes		8,050	96.1	−1.5
Informal votes		327	3.9	+1.5
Turnout		8,377	88.7	−3.8
Liberal and Country hold		Swing	+6.9	

=== Fisher ===
1973 South Australian state election: Fisher
Party	Candidate	Votes	%	±%
Liberal and Country	Stan Evans	9,876	59.4	+0.8
Labor	Ronald Caldicott	6,742	40.6	+5.6
Total formal votes		16,618	97.0	−1.8
Informal votes		511	3.0	+1.8
Turnout		17,129	94.1	+0.7
Liberal and Country hold		Swing	−2.4	

=== Flinders ===
1973 South Australian state election: Flinders
Party	Candidate	Votes	%	±%
Country	Peter Blacker	5,221	54.9	+54.9
Liberal and Country	John Carnie	4,297	45.1	−14.8
Total formal votes		9,518	93.4	−5.0
Informal votes		672	6.6	+5.0
Turnout		10,190	95.0	−1.0
Country gain from Liberal and Country		Swing	+54.9	

=== Florey ===
1973 South Australian state election: Florey
Party	Candidate	Votes	%	±%
Labor	Charles Wells	12,517	70.4	+2.2
Liberal and Country	Anthony Deane-Shaw	5,262	29.6	−2.2
Total formal votes		17,779	95.0	−2.6
Informal votes		925	5.0	+2.6
Turnout		18,704	94.6	−1.1
Labor hold		Swing	+2.2	

=== Frome ===
1973 South Australian state election: Frome
Party	Candidate	Votes	%	±%
Liberal and Country	Ernest Allen	4,584	60.9	+10.1
Labor	Gerard Casanova	2,939	39.1	−6.1
Total formal votes		7,523	97.1	−1.1
Informal votes		224	2.9	+1.1
Turnout		7,747	93.5	−0.2
Liberal and Country hold		Swing	+6.7	

=== Gilles ===
1973 South Australian state election: Gilles
Party	Candidate	Votes	%	±%
Labor	Jack Slater	8,846	55.8	+0.4
Liberal and Country	Donald Glazbrook	6,995	44.2	−0.4
Total formal votes		15,841	96.5	−1.7
Informal votes		574	3.5	+1.7
Turnout		16,415	94.8	−0.8
Labor hold		Swing	+0.4	

=== Glenelg ===
1973 South Australian state election: Glenelg
Party	Candidate	Votes	%	±%
Liberal and Country	John Mathwin	8,465	52.7	−1.0
Labor	Brian Crawford	7,604	47.3	+4.3
Total formal votes		16,069	97.8	−0.9
Informal votes		359	2.2	+0.9
Turnout		16,428	94.3	−1.3
Liberal and Country hold		Swing	−3.8	

=== Gouger ===
1973 South Australian state election: Gouger
Party	Candidate	Votes	%	±%
Liberal and Country	Keith Russack	4,502	48.3	−3.3
Labor	Peter Dewhurst	2,892	31.0	−9.5
Country	Ronald Crosby	1,439	15.4	+7.5
Independent	Patrick Carlin	489	5.3	+5.3
Total formal votes		9,322	97.9	−1.0
Informal votes		204	2.1	+1.0
Turnout		9,526	95.3	−0.8
Two-party-preferred result
Liberal and Country	Keith Russack	5,957	63.9	+5.2
Labor	Peter Dewhurst	3,365	36.1	−5.2
Liberal and Country hold		Swing	+5.2	

=== Goyder ===
1973 South Australian state election: Goyder
Party	Candidate	Votes	%	±%
Liberal and Country	Steele Hall	4,678	51.5	−9.9
Country	Francis McIntyre	2,811	30.9	+21.6
Independent	Donald Gardner	1,597	17.6	+17.6
Total formal votes		9,086	95.0	−3.8
Informal votes		476	5.0	+3.8
Turnout		9,562	96.2	−0.6
Two-candidate-preferred result
Liberal and Country	Steele Hall	5,477	60.3	−9.4
Country	Francis McIntyre	3,609	39.7	+39.7
Liberal and Country hold		Swing	N/A	

=== Hanson ===
1973 South Australian state election: Hanson
Party	Candidate	Votes	%	±%
Liberal and Country	Heini Becker	9,022	52.4	+2.0
Labor	Brian Smith	8,184	47.6	−2.0
Total formal votes		17,206	97.3	−1.0
Informal votes		470	2.7	+1.0
Turnout		17,676	93.7	−1.1
Liberal and Country hold		Swing	+2.0	

=== Henley Beach ===
1973 South Australian state election: Henley Beach
Party	Candidate	Votes	%	±%
Labor	Glen Broomhill	9,661	57.0	−0.9
Liberal and Country	Reginald Appelkamp	5,668	33.4	−8.7
Independent	Daniel Overduin	1,633	9.6	+9.6
Total formal votes		16,962	96.8	−1.3
Informal votes		564	3.2	+1.3
Turnout		17,526	94.1	−1.3
Two-party-preferred result
Labor	Glen Broomhill	10,211	60.2	+2.3
Liberal and Country	Reginald Appelkamp	6,751	39.8	−2.3
Labor hold		Swing	+2.3	

=== Heysen ===
1973 South Australian state election: Heysen
Party	Candidate	Votes	%	±%
Liberal and Country	William McAnaney	7,327	73.0	+5.4
Labor	Howard Houck	2,708	27.0	−5.4
Total formal votes		10,035	93.5	−4.2
Informal votes		694	6.5	+4.2
Turnout		10,729	94.3	−1.2
Liberal and Country hold		Swing	+5.4	

=== Kavel ===
1973 South Australian state election: Kavel
Party	Candidate	Votes	%	±%
Liberal and Country	Roger Goldsworthy	5,267	55.8	−9.6
Labor	Mark Eckermann	2,619	27.8	+27.8
Country	Elmore Schulz	1,550	16.4	−18.2
Total formal votes		9,436	97.7	+6.5
Informal votes		221	2.3	−6.5
Turnout		9,657	96.0	−0.2
Two-party-preferred result
Liberal and Country	Roger Goldsworthy	6,605	70.0	+4.6
Labor	Mark Eckermann	2,831	30.0	+30.0
Liberal and Country hold		Swing	N/A	

=== Light ===
1973 South Australian state election: Light
Party	Candidate	Votes	%	±%
Liberal and Country	Bruce Eastick	6,031	62.1	+8.7
Labor	William Sneesby	3,390	34.9	−9.2
Independent	Eric Gerlach	294	3.0	+0.6
Total formal votes		9,715	97.0	−1.5
Informal votes		305	3.0	+1.5
Turnout		10,020	95.6	−0.3
Two-party-preferred result
Liberal and Country	Bruce Eastick	6,179	63.6	+9.0
Labor	William Sneesby	3,536	36.4	−9.0
Liberal and Country hold		Swing	+9.0	

=== Mallee ===
1973 South Australian state election: Mallee
Party	Candidate	Votes	%	±%
Liberal and Country	Bill Nankivell	4,901	53.2	−4.9
Country	Joseph Philbey	4,318	46.8	+28.9
Total formal votes		9,219	94.6	−4.1
Informal votes		525	5.4	+4.1
Turnout		9,744	95.7	+1.9
Liberal and Country hold		Swing	N/A	

=== Mawson ===
1973 South Australian state election: Mawson
Party	Candidate	Votes	%	±%
Labor	Don Hopgood	13,812	61.6	+5.3
Liberal and Country	Leslie Scott	7,786	34.7	−9.0
Social Credit	George Gater	841	3.7	+3.7
Total formal votes		22,439	96.8	−1.0
Informal votes		730	3.2	+1.0
Turnout		23,169	94.0	−0.9
Two-party-preferred result
Labor	Don Hopgood	14,373	64.1	+7.8
Liberal and Country	Leslie Scott	8,056	35.9	−7.8
Labor hold		Swing	+7.8	

=== Millicent ===
1973 South Australian state election: Millicent
Party	Candidate	Votes	%	±%
Labor	Des Corcoran	5,724	56.5	+2.5
Liberal and Country	Murray Vandepeer	4,404	43.5	−2.5
Total formal votes		10,128	98.5	0.0
Informal votes		151	1.5	0.0
Turnout		10,279	96.2	−1.6
Labor hold		Swing	+2.5	

=== Mitcham ===
1973 South Australian state election: Mitcham
Party	Candidate	Votes	%	±%
Liberal and Country	Robin Millhouse	9,528	62.0	−3.0
Labor	Sean Dawes	4,977	32.4	−2.6
Independent	Arthur Cockington	856	5.6	+5.6
Total formal votes		15,361	98.0	−0.4
Informal votes		309	2.0	+0.4
Turnout		15,670	94.1	−0.2
Two-party-preferred result
Liberal and Country	Robin Millhouse	9,324	65.7	+0.7
Labor	Sean Dawes	6,037	34.3	−0.7
Liberal and Country hold		Swing	+0.7	

=== Mitchell ===
1973 South Australian state election: Mitchell
Party	Candidate	Votes	%	±%
Labor	Ron Payne	9,472	61.0	+1.7
Liberal and Country	Peter Daniels	6,059	39.0	−1.7
Total formal votes		15,531	96.8	−1.5
Informal votes		508	3.2	+1.5
Turnout		16,039	94.5	−1.0
Labor hold		Swing	+1.7	

=== Mount Gambier ===
1973 South Australian state election: Mount Gambier
Party	Candidate	Votes	%	±%
Labor	Allan Burdon	5,253	58.6	+3.8
Liberal and Country	David Rogers	2,566	25.1	+2.0
Independent	Brian O'Connor	1,671	16.3	−5.8
Total formal votes		10,228	97.6	−0.8
Informal votes		247	2.4	+0.8
Turnout		10,475	95.0	+0.8
Two-party-preferred result
Labor	Allan Burdon	6,546	64.0	+3.6
Liberal and Country	David Rogers	3,682	36.0	−3.6
Labor hold		Swing	+3.6	

=== Murray ===
1973 South Australian state election: Murray
Party	Candidate	Votes	%	±%
Liberal and Country	Ivon Wardle	5,929	57.3	+7.2
Labor	Harold McLaren	4,421	42.7	−4.2
Total formal votes		10,350	97.6	−1.0
Informal votes		253	2.4	+1.0
Turnout		10,603	95.9	−0.7
Liberal and Country hold		Swing	+5.1	

=== Norwood ===
1973 South Australian state election: Norwood
Party	Candidate	Votes	%	±%
Labor	Don Dunstan	9,033	59.7	+4.1
Liberal and Country	Peter Adamson	6,095	40.3	+1.7
Total formal votes		15,128	96.3	−1.6
Informal votes		583	3.7	+1.6
Turnout		15,711	92.9	−1.2
Labor hold		Swing	+2.5	

=== Peake ===
1973 South Australian state election: Peake
Party	Candidate	Votes	%	±%
Labor	Don Simmons	8,855	59.6	+0.3
Liberal and Country	Barbara Ashwin	6,003	40.4	−0.3
Total formal votes		14,858	95.6	−2.0
Informal votes		676	4.4	+2.0
Turnout		15,534	94.6	−1.0
Labor hold		Swing	+0.3	

=== Pirie ===
1973 South Australian state election: Pirie
Party	Candidate	Votes	%	±%
Labor	Dave McKee	6,749	73.9	−0.7
Independent	Myles McCallum	2,385	26.1	+26.1
Total formal votes		9,134	93.8	−4.1
Informal votes		602	6.2	+4.1
Turnout		9,736	95.4	−0.9
Labor hold		Swing	N/A	

=== Playford ===
1973 South Australian state election: Playford
Party	Candidate	Votes	%	±%
Labor	Terry McRae	11,545	64.8	+7.7
Liberal and Country	Lloyd Duffield	6,276	35.2	−0.4
Total formal votes		17,821	94.2	−3.9
Informal votes		1,104	5.8	+3.9
Turnout		18,925	93.6	−1.6
Labor hold		Swing	+4.0	

=== Price ===
1973 South Australian state election: Price
Party	Candidate	Votes	%	±%
Labor	John Ryan	9,396	64.6	−4.2
Liberal and Country	Jean Lawrie	3,718	25.5	−5.7
Independent	Julie Dearing	1,442	9.9	+9.9
Total formal votes		14,556	94.5	−2.2
Informal votes		852	5.5	+2.2
Turnout		15,408	94.3	−0.8
Two-party-preferred result
Labor	John Ryan	10,553	72.5	+3.7
Liberal and Country	Jean Lawrie	4,003	27.5	−3.7
Labor hold		Swing	+3.7	

=== Rocky River ===
1973 South Australian state election: Rocky River
Party	Candidate	Votes	%	±%
Liberal and Country	Howard Venning	4,454	47.8	−8.5
Country	Peter Longmire	2,716	29.2	+13.6
Labor	Nathan Smith	2,147	23.0	−5.1
Total formal votes		9,317	97.9	−0.8
Informal votes		201	2.1	+0.8
Turnout		9,518	95.9	−0.2
Two-candidate-preferred result
Liberal and Country	Howard Venning	4,680	50.2	−20.1
Country	Peter Longmire	4,637	49.8	+49.8
Liberal and Country hold		Swing	N/A	

=== Ross Smith ===
1973 South Australian state election: Ross Smith
Party	Candidate	Votes	%	±%
Labor	Jack Jennings	11,102	80.3	+12.2
Independent	John Lynch	2,720	19.7	+19.7
Total formal votes		13,822	92.9	−4.7
Informal votes		1,057	7.1	4.7
Turnout		14,879	94.6	−0.9
Labor hold		Swing	N/A	

=== Salisbury ===
1973 South Australian state election: Salisbury
Party	Candidate	Votes	%	±%
Labor	Reg Groth	10,943	84.0	+17.0
Independent	Robert Maczkowiack	2,079	16.0	+16.0
Total formal votes		13,022	86.8	−10.8
Informal votes		1,979	13.2	+10.8
Turnout		15,001	93.9	−0.9
Labor hold		Swing	N/A	

=== Semaphore ===
1973 South Australian state election: Semaphore
Party	Candidate	Votes	%	±%
Labor	Reg Hurst	11,472	72.7	−1.9
Liberal and Country	John Howarth	3,729	23.6	−1.8
Socialist	Keith Waye	576	3.7	+3.7
Total formal votes		15,777	95.7	−1.8
Informal votes		701	4.3	+1.8
Turnout		16,478	94.8	+0.2
Two-party-preferred result
Labor	Reg Hurst	11,991	76.0	+1.4
Liberal and Country	John Howarth	3,786	24.0	−1.4
Labor hold		Swing	+1.4	

=== Spence ===
1973 South Australian state election: Spence
Party	Candidate	Votes	%	±%
Labor	Ernie Crimes	11,363	81.9	+6.2
Independent	James Sheridan	2,508	18.1	+18.1
Total formal votes		13,871	92.7	−4.5
Informal votes		1,098	7.3	+4.5
Turnout		14,969	94.8	−0.5
Labor hold		Swing	N/A	

=== Stuart ===
1973 South Australian state election: Stuart
Party	Candidate	Votes	%	±%
Labor	Gavin Keneally	8,702	81.2	+5.2
Independent	George Rogers	2,012	18.8	+18.8
Total formal votes		10,714	92.9	−4.2
Informal votes		822	7.1	+4.2
Turnout		11,536	90.4	−2.3
Labor hold		Swing	N/A	

=== Tea Tree Gully ===
1973 South Australian state election: Tea Tree Gully
Party	Candidate	Votes	%	±%
Labor	Molly Byrne	13,525	62.2	+2.8
Liberal and Country	William Brassington	7,382	34.0	−6.0
Independent	Leo Davis	829	3.8	+3.8
Total formal votes		21,736	97.5	+0.6
Informal votes		566	2.5	−0.6
Turnout		22,302	94.6	−0.9
Two-party-preferred result
Labor	Molly Byrne	13,940	64.1	+4.7
Liberal and Country	William Brassington	7,796	35.9	−4.7
Labor hold		Swing	+4.7	

=== Torrens ===
1973 South Australian state election: Torrens
Party	Candidate	Votes	%	±%
Liberal and Country	John Coumbe	8,202	55.2	+1.3
Labor	Chris Sumner	6,669	44.8	+1.9
Total formal votes		14,871	96.8	−1.2
Informal votes		498	3.2	+1.2
Turnout		15,369	92.8	0.0
Liberal and Country hold		Swing	−1.4	

=== Unley ===
1973 South Australian state election: Unley
Party	Candidate	Votes	%	±%
Labor	Gil Langley	8,357	58.6	+3.7
Liberal and Country	Johnny Mac	5,040	35.4	−6.4
Happy Birthday	Susie Creamcheese	855	6.0	+6.0
Total formal votes		14,252	96.3	−1.5
Informal votes		546	3.7	+1.5
Turnout		14,798	93.0	−0.9
Two-party-preferred result
Labor	Gil Langley	8,785	61.6	+6.2
Liberal and Country	Johnny Mac	5,467	38.4	−6.2
Labor hold		Swing	+6.2	

=== Victoria ===
1973 South Australian state election: Victoria
Party	Candidate	Votes	%	±%
Liberal and Country	Allan Rodda	5,768	64.1	+5.7
Country	Graham Carrick	3,232	35.9	+20.7
Total formal votes		9,000	93.8	−4.9
Informal votes		598	6.2	+4.9
Turnout		9,598	94.7	−0.9
Liberal and Country hold		Swing	N/A	

=== Whyalla ===
1973 South Australian state election: Whyalla
Party	Candidate	Votes	%	±%
Labor	Max Brown	6,878	74.7	+17.8
Liberal and Country	Jason Reid	2,334	25.3	+13.1
Total formal votes		9,212	96.7	−0.7
Informal votes		316	3.3	+0.7
Turnout		9,528	91.4	−1.9
Labor hold		Swing	N/A	

== See also ==
- Members of the South Australian House of Assembly, 1973–1975
