= 1977 Australia Day Honours =

The 1977 Australia Day Honours were announced on 26 January 1977 by the Governor General of Australia, Sir John Kerr.

The Australia Day Honours are the first of the two major annual honours lists, announced on Australia Day (26 January), with the other being the Queen's Birthday Honours which are announced on the second Monday in June.

== Order of Australia ==
=== Companion (AC) ===
Recipient	Citation	Notes
Sir Marcus Laurence Elwin Oliphant	For public service and service to the Crown.	
John Ignatius Armstrong	For public service.	

=== Officer (AO) ===
==== General Division ====
Recipient	Citation	Notes
Dr Robert James Bartholomew	For service to medical research, particularly clinical biochemistry.	
Phyllis Jean Benjamin MBE	For service to government and community.	
Maxwell Harold Bone	For service to further education.	
John Francis Seccombe Brown MC	For service to primary industry.	
Professor Samuel Warren Carey	For academic service in the field of geology.	
Eleanor Dark	For service to literature.	
Mervyn Gadd	For service to the beef cattle industry.	
Major-General Allan Charles Murchison MC ED	For military and public service.	
Ernest William Schroder	For service to manufacturing industry.	
Albert James Shard	For service to government.	

==== Military Division ====
Recipient	Citation	Notes
Brigadier Donald Sidney Baldwin	For distinguished service in responsible positions	
Major-General Mark Bradbury	For distinguished service in responsible positions	
Air Vice-Marshal John Gladstone Cornish	For distinguished service in responsible positions	
Major-General Peter Falkland	For distinguished service in responsible positions	
Rear-Admiral Maxwell Peter Reed	For distinguished service in responsible positions	

=== Member (AM) ===
==== General Division ====
Recipient	Citation	Notes
Henry Robert Beardsmore	For services to the community.	
Alderman Andrew Briger	For services to local government.	
Dr Winifred Mary Curtis	For academic service in the field of botany.	
Henry Reeves Day	For services to agricultural research.	
John Moore Dobbie	For services to the sport of bowls.	
Dr Alexander Osborne Donald	For services to medicine.	
Arthur Stanley Dunstan	For services to primary industry.	
David Llewellyn Elix	For services to manufacturing industry.	
Dr Joan Elizabeth Farrar	For services to medicine, particularly in the field of handicapped children.	
John Frederick Thornton Grimwade	For services to the community.	
Cr Arthur Duncan Hillgrove	For services to local government and the community.	
Ronald Ross Johnson	For services to industry.	
Hector John Lee	For services to science, particularly animal research.	
Vincent Reginald Long	For public service particularly in education.	
Dr Alice Marshall Moyle	For academic service, particularly in the study of aboriginal music.	
Dr Frederick Thomas Rose	For community service, particularly to retarded children.	
Allen Axel Strom	For services to conservation.	
Darrel Maxwell Taylor	For services to the arts.	
Friedrich Von Einem-Joosten	For service to international relations.	
Thomas Denys Bernard Webb	For community service.	

==== Military Division ====
Recipient	Citation	Notes
Wing Commander Roland Arthur Brazier	For exceptional service or performance of duty	
Colonel Raymond Lewis Burnard	For exceptional service or performance of duty	
Commander Adrian Ronald Cummins	For exceptional service or performance of duty	
Lieutenant-Colonel James Farry	For exceptional service or performance of duty	
Wing Commander Alexander Christy Freeleagus	For exceptional service or performance of duty	
Lieutenant-Colonel Hugh Bracken Gaffney	For exceptional service or performance of duty	
Wing Commander Gregory Leonard Hartig	For exceptional service or performance of duty	
Lieutenant-Colonel Thomas Richmond Harwood	For exceptional service or performance of duty	
Lieutenant-Colonel Busby Hill	For exceptional service or performance of duty	
Commander Christopher John Nisbet	For exceptional service or performance of duty	
Captain Ronald Trevor Richardson	For exceptional service or performance of duty	
Lieutenant-Colonel Richard Lawrance Carrington Twiss	For exceptional service or performance of duty	
Wing Commander Ian Michael Westmore	For exceptional service or performance of duty	

=== Medal (OAM) ===
==== General Division ====
Recipient	Citation	Notes
Rae Alexander Anderson	For community service.	
Correa Minnie Atkinson	For community service.	
Zena Rose Jane	For services to nursing.	
Lois Amalie Bellingham	For community service.	
Bruce Hebbert Boykett	For services to road safety.	
Patricia Mary Brown	For services to nursing.	
Sister Alexia Jean Burns	For services to nursing.	
Barbara Clarke	For services to Aboriginal children.	
George R. Clarke	For services to the disabled.	
Charles Malcolm Clift	For community service.	
Reverend Arthur Thomas Cottrell	For services with the Australian Inland Mission.	
James William Courtney	For services to the welfare of ex-servicemen.	
Horace William Davies	For community service.	
Maurice Donnelly	For services to the disabled.	
Leonard Kevin Duffy	For services to local government.	
Alfred Henry East	For community service.	
Edwin Eric Fuller	For services to local government.	
Alice May Graham	For services to sub-normal children.	
Gladys Ann Grainger	For services to aged and invalid pensioners.	
Dr Jean Grant	For services to community medical care.	
Robert Maxwell Grant	For services to first aid.	
Gordon Charles Gyles	For services to the community and to Scouting.	
John Kenneth Hall	For services to lawn tennis.	
Ruby Jean Harris	For community service.	
James William Hennahane	For community service.	
Glenda Mae James	For community service.	
Phyllis Mary Jenkins	For community service.	
William Donald Keating	For community service.	
Errol Hamilton Lane	For services to Scouting.	
Ross Richard Gay Lawson	For community services.	
William Stuart Claude Lee	For community service.	
Norman C. Lewis	For community service.	
Adelaide Lewthwaite	For community service.	
Harry Leslie Madigan	For community service.	
Myrtle Barbara McRae	For services to nursing.	
Robert James Moran	For services to the welfare of members of the Defence Force.	
William Leslie Morgan	For services to trade unionism.	
William Thomas Nicholls	For community service.	
Cr Panagiotis Emanuel Petrochilos	For community service.	
Mary Janet Ransom	For services to nursing.	
Cr Walter Mayo Rice	For services to local government.	
Stanley Edward Shrivell	For services to the Inventors Association of Australia.	
Albert Thompson	For services to local government.	
Wilma Joyce Wilson	For community service.	
George Matthew Wylie	For services to agriculture.	

==== Military Division ====
Recipient	Citation	Notes
Warrant Officer Stanley Allan Breasley	For meritorious service or performance of duty	
Warrant Officer Mervyn Hartley Clark	For meritorious service or performance of duty	
Warrant Officer Class I Brian Foster	For meritorious service or performance of duty	
Chief Petty Officer Trevor Henry George	For meritorious service or performance of duty	
Warrant Officer Class I Raymond Gordon Hooker	For meritorious service or performance of duty	
Warrant Officer Quartermaster Gunner Gordon Douglas Michael Hope	For meritorious service or performance of duty	
Warrant Officer Class I Geoffrey Alwyn Jebb	For meritorious service or performance of duty	
Warrant Officer Class I Theodore Rikus	For meritorious service or performance of duty	
