= Anne Levy (politician) =

Australian politician

The Honourable Anne Levy AO
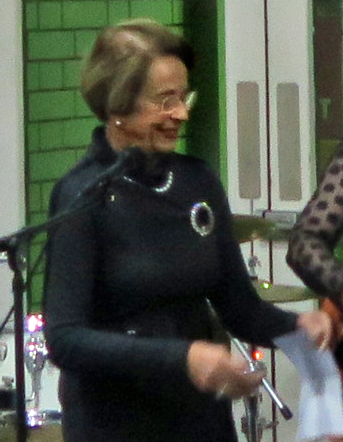
- Levy in April 2018

President of the South Australian Legislative Council
- In office 11 February 1986 – 13 April 1989
- Preceded by: Arthur Whyte
- Succeeded by: Gordon Bruce

Member of the South Australian Legislative Council
- In office 12 July 1975 – 10 October 1997

Personal details
- Born: Judith Anne Winstanley Levy; 29 September 1934 (age 92) Perth, Western Australia
- Party: Labor Party
- Spouse: Keith Barley (m. 1957; died 1975)
- Education: University of Adelaide

Judith Anne Winstanley Levy AO (born 29 September 1934) is a former Australian politician. She was a Labor member of the South Australian Legislative Council from 1975 to 1997.

Levy was born in Perth, Western Australia, and moved to Adelaide at the age of six. She graduated with bachelor's and master's degrees in Science from the University of Adelaide, and worked at the university as a senior tutor in genetics until she decided to enter politics.

Levy served as the first Labor President of the South Australian Legislative Council, from 1986 to 1989. Labor had not previously ever held the Legislative Council presidency. Additionally, Levy was the first and so far only woman to hold the Legislative Council presidency. In fact, she was the first woman to chair any House of any Parliament in Australia. Levy was also Labor's first female elected to the Legislative Council, and only the second female elected to the Legislative Council after the Liberal and Country League's Jessie Cooper. In April 1989, Levy was appointed Minister for Local Government and the Arts, with State Services added in December. In early 1991, her portfolios were re-organised as Local Government Relations and Arts and Cultural Heritage with the additional portfolio of Status of Women. She ceased to be a minister following Labor's election loss in 1993 and she retired from the Council in 1997.

From 2000 to 2005, Levy served as honorary consul for France in South Australia. At the end of her term, she was conferred a Chevalier de la Legion d'Honneur by the French government. In 1986 she was given the award of Australian Humanist of the Year for her work towards abortion law reform, voluntary euthanasia, family planning, decriminalisation of prostitution, and other reforms. Anne was a founding member and a Patron of the Humanist Society of South Australia. In 2011, she was made an Officer of the Order of Australia.

== See also ==
- Women and government in Australia
- Women in the South Australian Legislative Council
