= 1973 South Australian state election =

← 1970	10 March 1973	1975 →

All 47 seats in the South Australian House of Assembly 24 seats were needed for a majority 10 (of the 20) seats of the South Australian Legislative Council
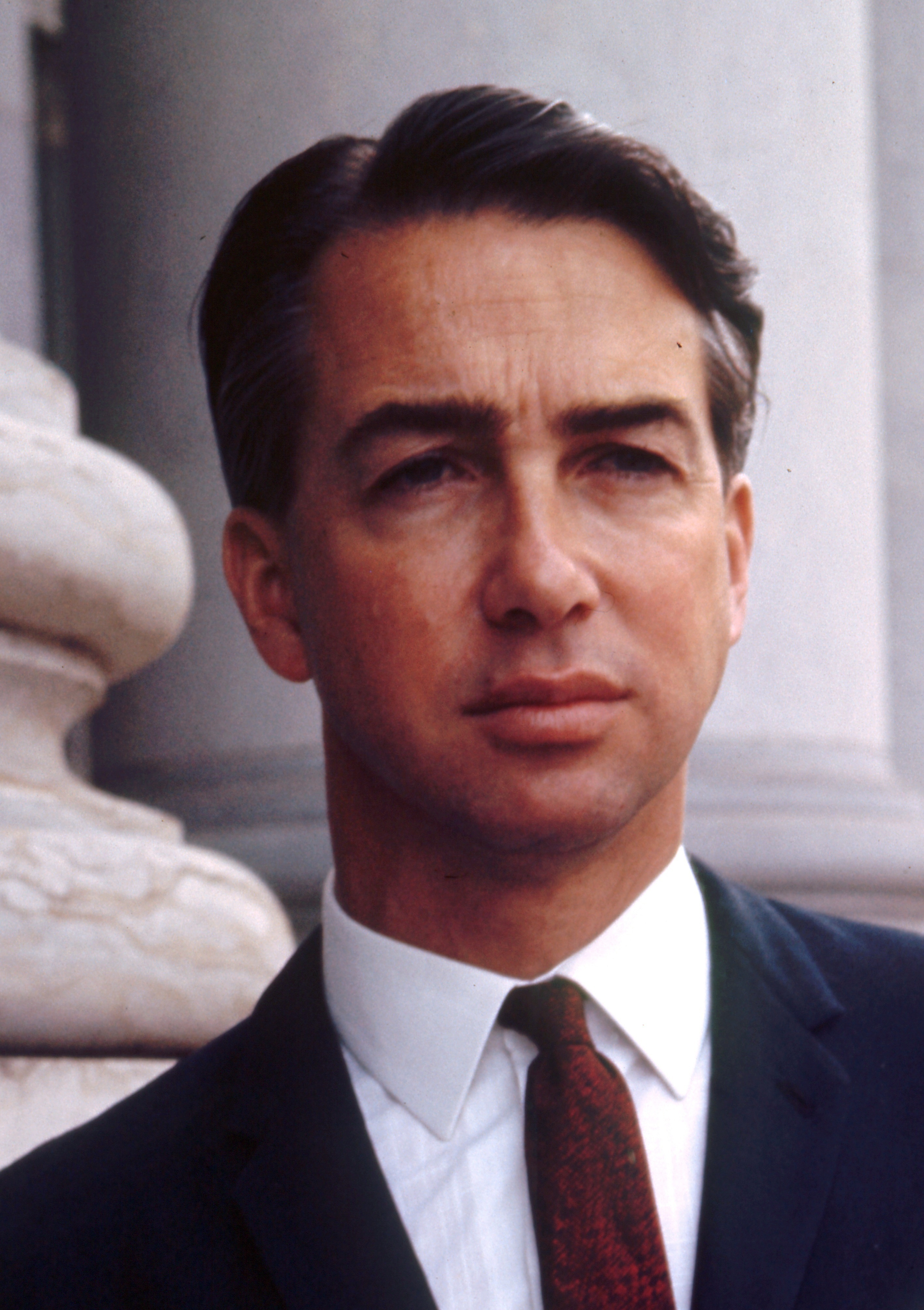

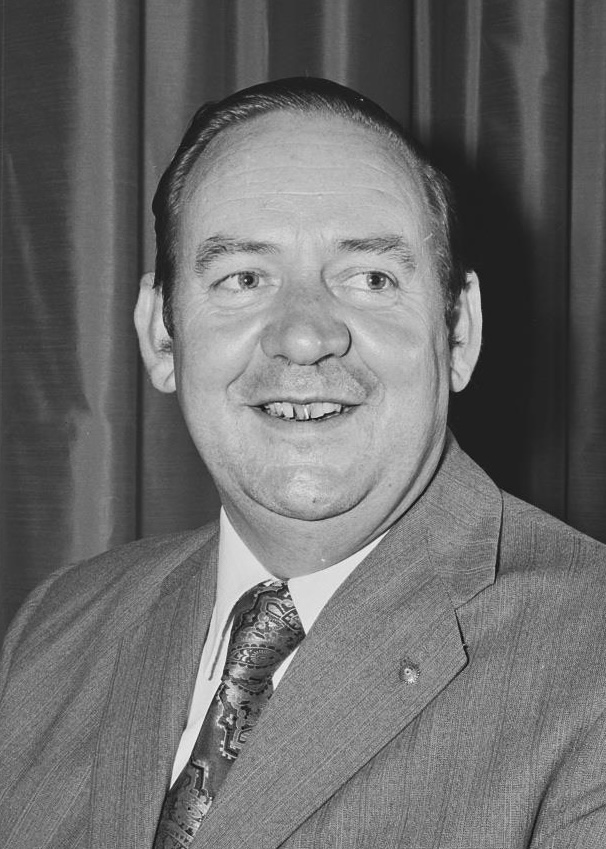
	First party	Second party
Leader	Don Dunstan	Bruce Eastick
Party	Labor	Liberal and Country League
Leader since	1 June 1967	15 March 1972
Leader's seat	Norwood	Light
Last election	27 seats	20 seats
Seats won	26 seats	20 seats
Seat change	▼1	0
Percentage	54.5%	45.5%
Swing	▲1.2	▼1.2
Premier before election
Don Dunstan
Labor
Elected Premier
Don Dunstan
Labor

State elections were held in South Australia on 10 March 1973. All 47 seats in the South Australian House of Assembly were up for election. The incumbent Australian Labor Party led by Premier of South Australia Don Dunstan won a second term in government, defeating the Liberal and Country League led by Leader of the Opposition Bruce Eastick.

== Background ==
Parliamentary elections for both houses of the Parliament of South Australia were held in South Australia in 1973, which saw Don Dunstan and the Australian Labor Party win a second successive term, against the Liberal and Country League (LCL) led by Bruce Eastick.

It was only the second time that a Labor government in South Australia had been re-elected for a second term, the first being the early Thomas Price Labor government. It would be the first five-year-incumbent Labor government however.

Moderate Liberal Movement forces within the LCL broke away to form its own party led by Steele Hall after the election in 1973. The LCL became the South Australian Division of the Liberal Party of Australia a year after the election.

The Country Party also won a seat for the first time in Flinders, and finished second after preferences with no Labor candidate in five LCL seats − Rocky River, Mallee, Alexandra, Goyder and Victoria.

A 1973 Semaphore by-election and a 1974 Goyder by-election were triggered. Labor and the Liberal Movement easily retained their respective seats.

The Democratic Labor Party, which won 0.71% of the vote and no seats in 1970, chose not to contest the election.

== Key dates ==
- Issue of writ: 20 February 1973
- Close of nominations: 27 February 1973
- Polling day: 10 March 1973
- Return of writ: On or before 10 April 1973

== Results ==
=== House of Assembly ===
Arrangement of the House of Assembly after the 1973 state election.

South Australian state election, 10 March 1973 House of Assembly << 1970–1975 >>
Enrolled voters	696,290				
Votes cast	655,937		Turnout	94.20%	-0.83%
Informal votes	26,794		Informal	4.08%	+2.02%
Summary of votes by party
Party	Primary votes	%	Swing	Seats	Change
Labor	324,135	51.52%	–0.12%	26	1
Liberal and Country	250,312	39.79%	–3.97%	20	± 0
Country	24,810	3.94%	+2.05%	1	+ 1
Independent	27,178	4.32%	+2.86%	0	± 0
Other	2,708	0.43%	*	0	± 0
Total	629,143			47	
Two-party-preferred
Labor		54.50%	+1.20%		
Liberal and Country		45.50%	–1.20%		

=== Legislative Council ===
Arrangement of the Legislative Council after the 1973 state election.

South Australian state election, 10 March, 1973 Legislative Council << 1968–1975 >>
Enrolled voters	383,758				
Votes cast	357,971		Turnout	93.3	–1.9
Informal votes	27,140		Informal	7.6	+1.7
Summary of votes by party
Party	Primary votes	%	Swing	Seats won	Seats held
Labor	174,082	52.6	–5.3	4	6
Liberal and Country	152,921	46.2	+4.2	6	14
Australia	2,618	0.8	+0.8	0	0
Independent	1,210	0.4	+0.4	0	0
Total	330,831			10	20

== Post-election pendulum ==
Labor seats (26)
Marginal
Gilles	Jack Slater	ALP	5.8%
Fairly safe
Millicent	Des Corcoran	ALP	6.5%
Coles	Len King	ALP	9.2%
Peake	Don Simmons	ALP	9.6%
Norwood	Don Dunstan	ALP	9.6%
Safe
Henley Beach	Glen Broomhill	ALP	10.2%
Mitchell	Ron Payne	ALP	11.0%
Unley	Gil Langley	ALP	11.6%
Brighton	Hugh Hudson	ALP	12.0%
Mount Gambier	Allan Burdon	ALP	14.0%
Mawson	Don Hopgood	ALP	14.1%
Tea Tree Gully	Molly Byrne	ALP	14.1%
Ascot Park	Geoff Virgo	ALP	14.7%
Playford	Terry McRae	ALP	14.8%
Adelaide	Jack Wright	ALP	16.7%
Elizabeth	Peter Duncan	ALP	19.6%
Florey	Charles Wells	ALP	20.4%
Albert Park	Charles Harrison	ALP	21.7%
Price	John Ryan	ALP	22.5%
Pirie	Dave McKee	ALP	23.9% v IND
Whyalla	Max Brown	ALP	24.7%
Semaphore	Reg Hurst	ALP	26.0%
Ross Smith	Jack Jennings	ALP	30.3% v IND
Stuart	Gavin Keneally	ALP	31.2% v IND
Spence	Ernie Crimes	ALP	31.9% v IND
Salisbury	Reg Groth	ALP	34.0% v IND

LCL seats (20)
Marginal
Rocky River	Howard Venning	LCL	0.2% v NAT
Hanson	Heini Becker	LCL	2.4%
Glenelg	John Mathwin	LCL	2.7%
Mallee	Bill Nankivell	LCL	3.2% v NAT
Chaffey	Peter Arnold	LCL	3.5%
Torrens	John Coumbe	LCL	5.2%
Fairly safe
Murray	Ivon Wardle	LCL	7.3%
Alexandra	Ted Chapman	LCL	8.2% v NAT
Fisher	Stan Evans	LCL	9.4%
Safe
Goyder	David Boundy	LCL	10.3% v NAT
Frome	Ernest Allen	LCL	10.9%
Light	Bruce Eastick	LCL	13.6%
Gouger	Keith Russack	LCL	13.6%
Victoria	Allan Rodda	LCL	14.1% v NAT
Mitcham	Robin Millhouse	LCL	15.7%
Bragg	David Tonkin	LCL	16.4%
Davenport	Dean Brown	LCL	18.2%
Kavel	Roger Goldsworthy	LCL	20.0%
Eyre	Graham Gunn	LCL	22.6%
Heysen	William McAnaney	LCL	23.0%
Crossbench seats (1)
Flinders	Peter Blacker	CP	4.9% v LCL

== See also ==
- Results of the South Australian state election, 1973 (House of Assembly)
- Results of the 1973 South Australian state election (Legislative Council)
- Members of the South Australian House of Assembly, 1973–1975
- Members of the South Australian Legislative Council, 1973–1975
