= Alice Marshall Moyle =

Australian ethnomusicologist

Alice Marshall Moyle AM FAHA
- Born: Alice Marshall Brown; 25 December 1908; Bloemfontein, South Africa
- Died: 9 April 2005 (aged 96); Sydney, New South Wales, Australia
- Awards: Doctor of Music (honoris causa), University of Sydney (1989) and University of Melbourne (1995)

Academic background
- Education: University of Melbourne; University of Sydney
- Alma mater: Monash University
- Influences: A. P. Elkin

Alice Marshall Moyle AM FAHA (25 December 1908 – 9 April 2005) was an Australian ethnomusicologist.

== Early life and education ==
Alice Marshall Brown was born in Bloemfontein, South Africa on 25 December 1908. At four years old she came to Australia with her parents Margaretta and Ellison Brown. She was educated at Fintona Girls' Grammar School. Moyle's love of music grew from hearing African women singing as they worked. She graduated from the University of Melbourne with a Bachelor of Music in 1930. She completed a Bachelor of Arts in 1954 and then Master of Arts in 1957 at the University of Sydney. Returning to Melbourne, she completed a PhD in 1975 at Monash University, the first PhD granted by that university.

== Career ==
Moyle began work as both a music teacher and journalist. She married electronics and sound engineer John Murray Moyle in 1933. While he served in the RAAF during World War II, she worked for Wireless Weekly in Sydney as music critic.

While studying for her BA she attended a talk by anthropologist A. P. Elkin, which piqued her interest in Aboriginal music and she studied his recordings when working on her MA.

Encouraged by her husband, she went the first of many field trips in the late 1950s, recording Aboriginal songs and music.

She was a foundation member of the Australian Institute of Aboriginal Studies (now Australian Institute of Aboriginal and Torres Strait Islander Studies or AIATSIS) and worked there until her "retirement" at age 70, when she was appointed an honorary fellow and continued her research and field trips until she turned 88.

Moyle was one of the founders of the Musicological Society of Australia and was National President in 1982–83. She was also involved with the International Council for Traditional Music in Australia.

Aware of the lack of teaching materials for schools, in 1992 Moyle produced Music and Dance in Traditional Aboriginal Culture, a training package including a video, two audio cassettes, a book for students and a teacher's guide to the resources.

== Honours and recognition ==
Moyle was appointed a Member of the Order of Australia in the 1977 Australia Day Honours for "academic service, particularly in the study of aboriginal music". She was elected an Honorary Fellow of the Australian Academy of the Humanities in 1994.

A festschrift, Problems and Solutions: Occasional Essays in Musicology Presented to Alice M Moyle, celebrating her life's work was published in 1984. Both the University of Sydney (1989) and University of Melbourne (1995) awarded her a Doctor of Music (honoris causa).

== Death and legacy ==
Moyle died in Sydney on 9 April 2005. Her husband predeceased her in 1960. She was survived by her daughters Carolyn and Josephine and her sister Dorothy.

Her sound recordings, transcripts, research papers and correspondence are held by AIATSIS in Canberra. A portrait by Chris Gentle is held by the National Portrait Gallery.
