= Women in the South Australian Legislative Council =

There have been 24 women in the South Australian Legislative Council since its establishment in 1840. Women have had the right to vote and stand as candidates since 1894.

In 1895, South Australian women became the first state in Australia, and some of the first in the world, to be given the right to vote and stand for election to Parliament. The following year at the 1896 election, the first women in Australia voted. Ironically, South Australia was the last state to elect a female representative, at the 1959 election, when Jessie Cooper and Joyce Steele were elected to the Parliament of South Australia for the Liberal and Country League (LCL).

The first woman candidate for Legislative Council honours was Patience Howard, née Hawker (28 March 1900 – 9 August 1994), who stood for the Labor Party for Central No. 2 at the 1953 election. She was unsuccessful in this Liberal stronghold.

The first successful female candidate for the Legislative Council was Cooper. In 1975 she was joined by Labor's first female MLC, Anne Levy, who would later become the first and only female President of the South Australian Legislative Council. Sandra Kanck was the first female Democrat in 1993, and Ann Bressington was the first female independent in 2006.

== List of women in the South Australian Legislative Council ==
Names in bold indicate women who have been appointed as Ministers and Parliamentary Secretaries during their time in Parliament. Names in italics indicate entry into Parliament through a by-election or by appointment and * symbolises members that have sat as members in both the Legislative Council and the Legislative Assembly.

#	Name	Party	Period of service
1	Jessie Cooper	LCL/Liberal	7 March 1959 – 10 July 1979 (retired)
2	**Anne Levy**	Labor	12 July 1975 – 10 October 1997 (retired)
3	**Barbara Wiese**	Labor	15 September 1979 – 15 September 1995 (resigned)
4	**Diana Laidlaw**	Liberal	6 November 1982 – 6 June 2003 (resigned)
5	Carolyn Pickles	Labor	7 December 1985 – 8 February 2002 (retired)
6	Bernice Pfitzner	Liberal	23 October 1990 – 10 October 1997 (defeated)
7	**Caroline Schaefer**	Liberal	1 August 1993 – 20 March 2010 (retired)
8	Sandra Kanck	Democrats	11 December 1993 – 30 January 2009 (resigned)
8	**Carmel Zollo**	Labor	11 October 1997 – 15 March 2014 (retired)
10	**Gail Gago**	Labor	9 February 2002 – 17 March 2018 (retired)
11	Kate Reynolds	Democrats	17 February 2003 – 17 March 2006 (defeated)
12	**Michelle Lensink**	Liberal	26 June 2003 –
13	Ann Bressington	Independent	18 March 2006 – 15 March 2014 (retired)
14	Tammy Franks	Greens	20 March 2010 –
14	**Jing Lee**	Liberal	20 March 2010 –
14	Kelly Vincent	Dignity for Disability	20 March 2010 – 17 March 2018 (defeated)
17	Connie Bonaros	SA Best	17 March 2018 –
17	**Emily Bourke**	Labor	17 March 2018 –
17	Irene Pnevmatikos	Labor	17 March 2018 –
17	**Clare Scriven**	Labor	17 March 2018 –
21	Nicola Centofanti	Liberal	7 April 2020 –
22	Heidi Girolamo	Liberal	24 August 2021 –
23	Laura Curran	Liberal	19 March 2022 –
23	Sarah Game	One Nation	19 March 2022 –
