= Isaiah Perry =

English-Australian Methodist minister

The Rev. Isaiah Perry (c.1854 – 30 November 1911) was a Methodist minister, born and trained in England, who had a career in South Australia. He was the father of engineer Frank Perry and footballer Charlie Perry.

== History ==
Isaiah Perry was born in "Lawley Bank", Dawley, Shropshire, a son of John Perry. He trained for the ministry at the Richmond Theological College (now Richmond University), then one of four Methodist theological training colleges in England. In 1880, while still in his probationary period, he emigrated to South Australia, where he was hospitably received by John Colton, and conducted services at the Walkerville Methodist church. He subsequently served at Kingston and Archer Street North Adelaide as junior minister, then three years each at Koolunga, Terowie, Maitland, Kadina, Willunga, Quorn, Mount Lofty, Woodville and after an 1897 sojourn in England, served at Payneham for four years, then Mount Gambier. Suffering from ill-health, he retired to "Devona", Port Elliot in the hopes of a rest cure, but after a few months' illness and a surgical operation, died, surrounded by his family, and after visits by friends Rev. Vivian Roberts (President of the Methodist Conference) and the Rev. W. A. Potts of Prospect.

== Family ==
Isaiah Perry married Caroline Marie Paulina Roediger, eldest daughter of the Rev. Julius Roediger, on 8 October 1884. They had four sons and one daughter:

- John Perry (West Coast)
- Frank Tennyson Perry (4 February 1887 – 20 October 1965), industrialist and parliamentarian
- Rev. Charles Julius "Charlie" Perry (20 October 1888 – 4 January 1961) Methodist minister and Australian Rules footballer
- Albert Perry
- Nellie Perry

His brother Samuel Perry arrived in South Australia around 1886 and established a major iron works in Gawler which became the Perry Engineering factory.
