= Charlie Perry (Australian rules footballer) =

Australian rules footballer

Personal information
- Full name: Charles Julius Perry
- Born: 20 October 1888; Terowie, South Australia
- Died: 4 January 1961 (aged 72); North Adelaide, South Australia

Playing career^{1}
Years	Club	Games (Goals)
1909–1915, 1920	Norwood	57 (15)
- ^{1} Playing statistics correct to the end of 1920.

Career highlights
- AIF Pioneer Exhibition Game, London, 28 October 1916

Charles Julius Perry (20 October 1888 – 4 January 1961) was an Australian rules footballer who played with Norwood in the SAFL, and a Methodist Chaplain who served in the First AIF.

== Family ==
The son of Isaiah Perry (1854-1911), and Caroline Marie Paulina Perry (1869-1956), née Roediger, Charles Julius Perry was born in Terowie, South Australia on 20 October 1888. His brother, Sir Frank Tennyson Perry (1887-1965) was a South Australian industrialist and member of parliament.

He married Florence Muriel Day (1985-1973) on 16 September 1920.

== Football ==
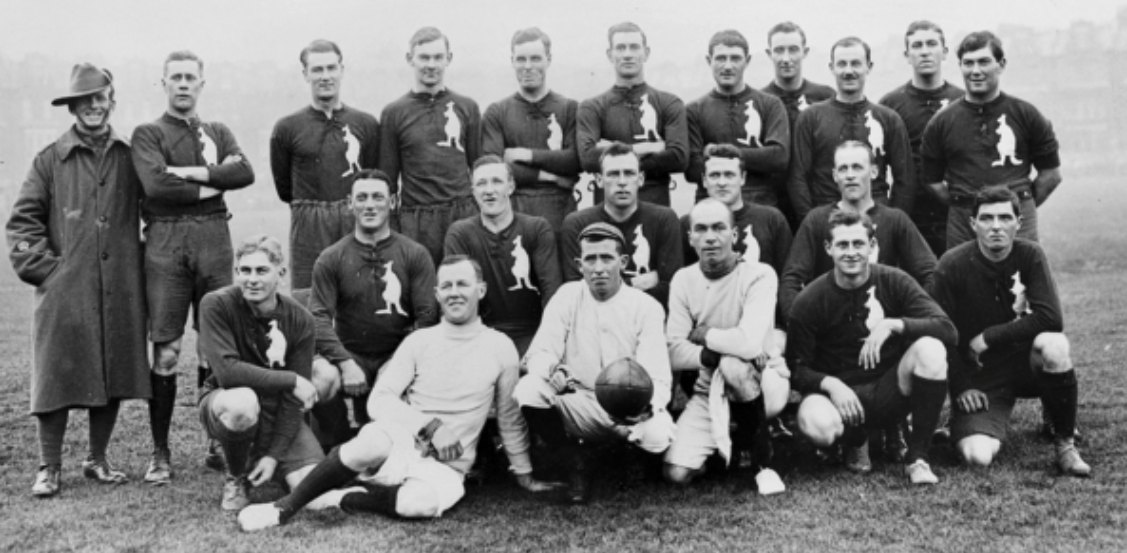
The Australian Training Units Team: 28 October 1916. Charlie Perry is the third of the five seated players.

=== Norwood (SAFL) ===
Perry, commonly known as "Redwing" due to his red hair, appeared in 58 games for Norwood and would have played more had World War I not interrupted his career. A Methodist minister, Perry finished equal first in a three way tie for the 1915 Magarey Medal count before having to settle for second after the umpires conferred to split the leaders as per the rules at the time. He was however posthumously awarded a retrospective Medal in 1998.

=== Training Units team (AIF) ===
He was captain of the Combined Training Units team in the AIF exhibition match which was played in London in 1916.

== Military service ==
Enlisting on 1 March 1916, he served in Europe as a chaplain during World War I, and was involved in the AIF exhibition match which was played in London in 1916, captaining the Combined Training Units team. A news film was taken at the match.

On 24 January 1919, Lieutenant-Colonel H. D. K. Macartney, the Officer Commanding of the 3rd Australian Divisional Artillery recommended that Perry be appointed as an Officer of the Order of the British Empire:

"During the period Sept.17th to Decr.31st 1918, Chaplain-Major PERRY has been Chaplain to the 8th Aust.F.A.Brigade [viz., Australian Field Artillery Brigade]. His duties have always been carried out in a thoroughly cheerful and tactful manner, and throughout the rapid advance, leading up to the cessation of hostilities, his gallant bearing and unselfish devotion to duty, generally under adverse conditions, have materially assisted the administration of this Unit. He has been a splendid example to both Officers and men. [Signed] H.D.K. Macartney, Lieut-Colonel. Commander, 3rd. Aust. Div. Artillery.".

There is no indication within the records at the Australian War Memorial as to whether the Officerhood of the Order of the British Empire was ever awarded to Perry as Macartney had recommended.

After the war he returned to Norwood but only played briefly before retiring in 1920.

He continued to serve in the Methodist clergy and, also, served as vice-chairman of the Norwood Football Club.

== See also ==
- 1916 Pioneer Exhibition Game
