= Peter Duncan (Australian politician) =

Australian politician

The Honourable Peter Duncan

Minister for Employment and Education Services
- In office 19 January 1988 – 4 April 1990
- Prime Minister: Bob Hawke
- Preceded by: Clyde Holding
- Succeeded by: Peter Baldwin

Minister for Land Transport and Infrastructure Support
- In office 24 July 1987 – 19 January 1988
- Prime Minister: Bob Hawke
- Preceded by: office established
- Succeeded by: Clyde Holding

Member of the Australian Parliament for Makin
- In office 1 December 1984 – 2 March 1996
- Preceded by: New seat
- Succeeded by: Trish Draper

Minister for Health
- In office 15 March 1979 – 18 September 1979
- Premier: Des Corcoran
- Preceded by: Jennifer Cashmore
- Succeeded by: Don Banfield

Attorney-General of South Australia
- In office 9 October 1975 – 15 March 1979
- Premier: Don Dunstan
- Preceded by: Don Dunstan
- Succeeded by: Don Banfield

Member of the South Australian House of Assembly for Elizabeth
- In office 10 March 1973 – 25 October 1984
- Preceded by: John Clark
- Succeeded by: Martyn Evans

Personal details
- Born: 1944 or 1945 (age 81–82) Melbourne, Victoria, Australia
- Party: Australian Labor Party
- Education: University of Adelaide

Peter Duncan (born 1944 or 1945) is an Australian politician and businessman who has represented the Australian Labor Party in both state and federal politics. He served as a member of the South Australian parliament from 1973 to 1984, and as a member of the federal parliament from 1984 to 1996. He is one of relatively few members of parliament to have served not only in both a state and national parliament, but also as a minister in both cases.

== Early life and education ==
Peter Duncan was born in 1944 or 1945 Melbourne and attended the University of Adelaide, where he studied law and was co-editor of the student newspaper On Dit in 1968.

== Career ==
=== Politics ===
Duncan was elected to the South Australian House of Assembly for the electorate of Elizabeth in the 1973 South Australian election, when he was 28.

In state parliament, Duncan served as 41st Attorney-General of South Australia from 1975 until 1979, and then as Minister for Health until the defeat of the Corcoran Labor government at the 1979 state election. He resigned from state politics in 1984, sparking an Elizabeth by-election.

He contested the seat of Makin in the 1984 Australian federal election, which he retained at every election until Labor's federal defeat in 1996.

Duncan was Minister for Land Transport and Infrastructure Support (1987–88) and Minister for Employment and Education Services for over three years from 1988 to 1990. After leaving the ministry in 1990, he became Parliamentary Secretary to the Attorney-General in December 1991, a post he held until Labor lost office in 1996.

During his time in federal parliament, he was assisted by Jim Hyde in various roles, including electorate officer, campaign manager, and senior private secretary when he was a minister. After Hyde's death in 2018, Duncan sent a tribute to be read out in the South Australian House of Assembly by Frances Bedford.

=== Business ===
Duncan had a business career after politics, which became a source of controversy when he was charged in September 2007 with "making an untrue statement in application for a Commonwealth grant and with dishonestly causing loss to a Commonwealth entity". It was reported that this had occurred in the wake of the failure of his plastic recycling business Omnipol. He was subsequently ordered to stand trial on three counts in the South Australian District Court. Duncan went on trial on 3 November 2008, pleading not guilty. On 11 November, he was acquitted on all charges.

Parliament of South Australia
Preceded by John Clark	Member for Elizabeth; 1973–1984	Martyn Evans
Preceded by Gil Langley	Government Whip; 1975	Succeeded by Glen Broomhill
Preceded by Don Dunstan	Attorney-General of South Australia; 1975–1979	Succeeded by Don Banfield
Preceded by Ron Payne	Minister for Prices and Consumer Affairs; 1975–1979	Succeeded by Don Banfield
Preceded by Don Banfield	Minister for Health; 1979	Succeeded by Jennifer Cashmore
Parliament of Australia
New division	Member for Makin; 1984–1996	Succeeded by Trish Draper
Preceded by New ministry	Minister for Land Transport and Infrastructure Support; 1987–1988	Succeeded by Clyde Holding
Preceded by Clyde Holding	Minister for Employment and Education Services; 1988–1990	Succeeded by Peter Baldwin
