= Dudley Octoman =

Australian politician

Charles Caleb Dudley Octoman (31 May 1904 – 11 September 1966), commonly known as Dudley Octoman or C. D. Octoman, was a politician in the State of South Australia.

He was born the oldest of four sons of Charles Machon Octoman (ca.1871 – 28 March 1949), perhaps in Tumby Bay, where his father, a coachbuilder, was a pioneer, or in Lipson, where he later had a farm. The family lived in Payneham from 1919 to 1926 for the sons' education. Dudley was employed as a teller with the National Bank of Australasia at Mount Gambier then Port Elliot

He enlisted with the RAAF during World War II and remained with the service for several years after cessation of hostilities.

He was elected to a Northern districts seat on the Legislative Council 6 March 1965 and died in office. Arthur Whyte won the resulting by-election.

== Family ==
Dudley Octoman married Laurel Bond Riggs (1905–1990) on 1 March 1928. They had a son Neil Riggs Octoman on 7 May 1932.

He had three brothers: Frederick Joseph Reginald (15 December 1906 – 1992), born at Lipson SA, married Betty Hazel McDougall in 1933; a younger brother Vivian Machon Octoman (c. 1908–1967) who married Mavis Jessie Lorna Wishart in 1934, and the youngest Mervyn Provis Octoman (8 June 1911 – 1979) born at Port Lincoln, married (Doris) Violet Jean Wishart in 1936.
