= Frank Perry (politician) =

Australian industrialist and politician

Sir Frank Tennyson Perry (4 February 1887 – 20 October 1965) was an industrialist and politician in the State of South Australia.

== History ==
Frank was born in Gawler, South Australia a son of Isaiah Perry and nephew of Samuel Perry, founder of Perry Engineering. He started working for his uncle in 1903, and was made manager of the newly acquired Gawler workshops of Martin & Co., in 1915; he became works manager of the Mile End factory around 1918, and on his uncle's death inherited, and greatly expanded the business, both at Mile End and Whyalla.

He was a founder of the Australian Metal Industries Association, and a member of the South Australian Chamber of Manufactures, and president of the Metal Trades Association. He was chairman of the Ammunition Industry Advisory Committee of the Department of Defence from 1952 to 1955, following on from his involvement with various Defence procurement boards during the War.

He married in 1911. By 1915 they were living at "Dawley" College Street, College Park. In 1924 he was elected Councillor, and in 1928 Alderman with the Corporate Town of St Peters, and served as mayor 1932–1933. He was elected to the seat of East Torrens in the South Australian House of Assembly in 1933, and held the seat until 1938. By 1940 they were living at "Dawley", Burnside Road, Leabrook. He was elected to a Central District No.2 seat in the Legislative Council in 1947 and held it until his death in 1965.

He was made a Member of the Order of the British Empire (MBE) in 1951, and knighted in 1954.

== Family ==
John Perry and Harriett Perry (ca.1834 – 24 September 1918) of Shropshire, England, had two sons who emigrated to South Australia:

- Rev. Isaiah Perry (ca.1854 – 30 November 1911) born at Lawley Bank, Dawley, Shropshire married Caroline Roediger on 8 October 1884

- John Perry
- Frank Tennyson Perry (1887–1965) married Hildegard Therese "Hilda" Matschoss on 27 December 1911. They had a son and two daughters:

- Frank Spencer Perry (9 September 1913 – 7 August 1951) married Margaret Florence Collin on 20 April 1940. They had two sons, born on 14 April 1942 and 1 May 1950; lived at 2 College Street, College Park. His death was not mentioned in the newspapers. Margaret married again, to G. W. W. Griffith on 8 November 1952.
- Margaret Pauline "Peg" Perry (18 July 1917–16 October 2011) married John Mackie Gebhardt on 17 October 1936.
- (Audrey) Vivienne Perry LLB (29 July 1925–14 March 1964) married Donald Hope Laidlaw on 2 February 1948. Their eldest daughter Diana Laidlaw was a noted State politician.

- Rev. Charles Julius Perry (1888–1961) Methodist minister and Australian Rules footballer
- Albert Perry
- Nellie Perry

- Samuel Perry (1865–1930) married Mary Jane Rofe ( – 9 August 1924) on 7 March 1894, lived at "Brier Holme" Grove Street Unley Park

- daughter V. M. Perry
