= Murray Hill (politician) =

Australian politician

The Honourable Murray Hill AM
- Hill on ABC's 'This Day Tonight', 1972.

Minister for Local Government
- In office 17 April 1968 – 1 June 1970
- Premier: Steele Hall
- Preceded by: Stan Bevan
- Succeeded by: Geoff Virgo
- In office 18 September 1979 – 10 November 1982
- Premier: David Tonkin
- Preceded by: John Bannon
- Succeeded by: Terry Hemmings

Member of the South Australian Legislative Council
- In office 4 December 1965 – 4 July 1988

Personal details
- Born: 2 July 1923 Glenelg, South Australia, Australia
- Died: 24 March 2003 (aged 79), Australia
- Party: Liberal and Country League; Liberal Party
- Spouse: Eunice Greenslade
- Children: The Hon. Robert Hill

Charles Murray Hill AM (2 July 1923 – 24 March 2003), generally known as Murray Hill, was a real estate agent and politician in the State of South Australia.

== Biography ==
Hill was born in Glenelg, South Australia, a son of Theodore Charles Hill and his wife Heloise Margery Hill (née Winterbottom); later at Millswood Estate. He enlisted in the Royal Australian Navy in 1941 and served as a seaman during World War II. In 1946 he established Murray Hill & Co., real estate agents, with offices in Grenfell Street.

In 1972 after the alleged murder of University of Adelaide law lecturer Dr George Duncan at a known gay beat at the hands of police officers, and the significant public outrage that followed, Hill proceeded to introduce a private member's bill, with implicit support from the Labor Party, on 26 July 1972 to amend the Criminal Law Consolidation Act that criminalised homosexuality, thus being the first serious attempt to decriminalise homosexuality in Australia. While Hill's amendment was assented to on 9 November 1972, a further amendment weakened it to only allow a legal defense for homosexual acts committed in private. Labor member Peter Duncan went further however when, following an unsuccessful attempt to strengthen Hill's bill in 1973, introduced on 27 August 1975 an unaltered bill to the parliament, which was defeated twice and then reintroduced a third time before passing, making South Australia the first Australian State to fully decriminalise homosexuality.

He served as Minister for Transport, Local Government and Roads from April 1968 to June 1970, then as Minister for Arts, Local Government and Housing from September 1979 to November 1982. He retired in July 1988. In the 1990 Australia Day honours list, Hill was made a Member of the Order of Australia (AM) for "service to the South Australian Parliament and to the community."

== Family ==
He married Eunice Greenslade of Colonel Light Gardens on 21 June 1944.

His son, Robert Hill, was a federal MP and Minister for Defence.

Political offices
Preceded by Stan Bevan	Minister for Local Government; 1968 – 1970	Succeeded by Geoff Virgo
Preceded by Alfred Kneebone	Minister for Transport; 1968 – 1970	Succeeded by Geoff Virgo as Minister of Roads and Transport
Preceded by Stan Bevan	Minister for Roads; 1968 – 1970	Succeeded by Geoff Virgo as Minister of Roads and Transport
Preceded by John Bannon	Minister for Local Government; 1979 – 1982	Succeeded by Terry Hemmings
New title	Minister for the Arts; 1979 – 1982	Succeeded by John Bannon as Minister for the Arts
Preceded by Ronald Payne	Minister for Housing; 1979 – 1982	Succeeded by Terry Hemmings
Preceded by Des Corcoran as Minister of Ethnic Affairs	Minister Assisting the Premier in Ethnic Affairs; 1979 – 1982	Succeeded by Christopher Sumner as Minister of Ethnic Affairs
Preceded by Ren DeGaris	Father of the Parliament of South Australia; 1985–1988	Succeeded by Stan Evans
