= Don Laidlaw =

Australian lawyer, businessman, and politician

Donald Hope Laidlaw AO LL.B., B.Litt.(Oxon) (6 August 1923 – 14 April 2009) was a lawyer, businessman, and politician in South Australia.

== Biography ==
Laidlaw was educated at St. Peter's College, then studied Law and Literature at the University of Adelaide and Magdalen College, Oxford. He was called to the bar in 1948.

During World War II he served in the AIF Intelligence Corps as a Japanese interpreter including a brief stint in 1942–1943 at the Loveday Camp in rural South Australia.

Laidlaw was elected as a Liberal candidate to the Legislative Council in July 1975 and served until November 1982.

He was appointed an Officer of the Order of Australia (AO) in the 1989 Australia Day Honours for "service to secondary industry, the South Australian Parliament and to the community".

He was a member of the Royal Adelaide Golf Club, The Royal and Ancient Golf Club of St Andrews and served on the boards of numerous boards, including Adbri, Quarry Industries, Adelaide Wallaroo Fertilizers, Bennett & Fisher and Perry Engineering.

== Personal life ==
His father was Lyndley Hope Laidlaw of Victoria Avenue, Unley Park.

He married (Audrey) Vivienne Perry LLB (29 July 1925 – 14 March 1964), a daughter of Frank Tennyson Perry, on 2 February 1948. Their eldest daughter, Diana Laidlaw, was a noted South Australian politician.

He married again, to Vivienne's sister Margaret Pauline (18 July 1917 – 16 October 2011).
