= Lyell McEwin =

Australian politician

The Honourable Sir Lyell McEwin KBE
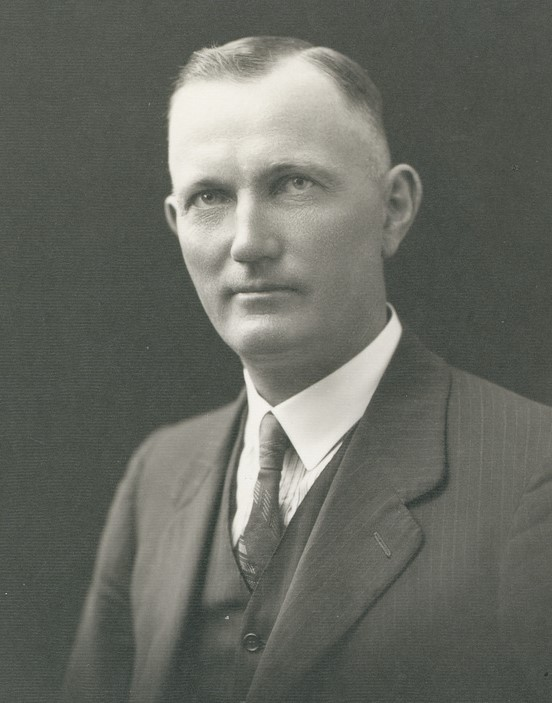

Minister for Health
- In office 8 August 1939 – 10 March 1965
- Premier: Thomas Playford IV
- Preceded by: Sir George Ritchie
- Succeeded by: Bert Shard

President of the South Australian Legislative Council
- In office 8 March 1967 – 11 July 1975
- Preceded by: Les Densley
- Succeeded by: Frank Potter

Member of the Legislative Council of South Australia
- In office 20 October 1934 – 11 July 1975
- Preceded by: William Morrow

Personal details
- Born: Alexander Lyell McEwin; 29 May 1897 Blyth, South Australia
- Died: 23 September 1988 (aged 91) Felixstow, South Australia
- Party: Liberal and Country League
- Spouse: Dora Winifred Williams (m. 1921; died 1981)
- Occupation: Farmer and politician

Sir Alexander Lyell McEwin KBE (29 May 1897 – 23 September 1988), always known as "Lyell McEwin" was a politician in South Australia.

He served as the member of organizations including Agricultural Settlement Committee, Board of Management Blyth District Hospital, District Council of Hutt and Hill Rivers; and a committee member of the Blyth Agricultural and Horticultural Society. In addition, he was president of the Blyth Agricultural Bureau and the Blyth Veterinary Lodge, and vice-president of the Blyth Bowling Club.

== History ==
Lyell McEwin was born in the Hundred of Hart, the youngest son of Alexander Lyell McEwin (1862 – 29 December 1927) and Jessie Smilie McEwin née Ferguson, who married 30 May 1888. He was educated locally and won a scholarship to Prince Alfred College. He attended the college for a period, but returned to the family farm at age 14.

In the 1930s, he was a member of the Agricultural Settlement Committee, president of the Blyth Agricultural Bureau and the Blyth Veterinary Lodge, Captain of the Blyth Rifle Club, vice-president of the Blyth Bowling Club, and a member of the Board of Management Blyth District Hospital, member of the District Council of Hutt and Hill Rivers; and a committee member of the Blyth Agricultural and Horticultural Society, and deeply involved in several organizations associated with the Liberal and Country League.

In October 1934, campaigning as a "practical farmer", McEwin won the Northern district seat in the Legislative Council made vacant by the death of William Morrow. He retained the seat until June 1975, when he retired.

McEwin filled the Cabinet positions of Chief Secretary from 1939, coupled with Minister of Mines and Minister of Health. It was perhaps as Minister of Health that he left the greatest mark. He oversaw the provision of many country hospitals funded on a subsidy basis: for every pound a local auxiliary raised, the Government contributed two. The major teaching hospital constructed on his watch was that at Elizabeth, later named the Lyell McEwin Hospital in his honour. While perfectly adequate, the building was designed with economy in mind. McEwin's "practical farmer" frugality appealed to Premier Playford.

He was elected President of the South Australian Legislative Council on 8 March 1967.

== Family ==
He married Dora Winifred Williams (born 9 May 1898) of "Fairview", Blyth, South Australia on 16 February 1921. They had four sons and a daughter. They lived at "Wyndora" homestead, 8 kilometres (5.0 mi) north of Blyth.

== Other interests ==
He was a member of the Caledonian Society of South Australia and its chief from 1959 to 1968.

He was a longtime worshipper at St. Andrew's Presbyterian Church, North Adelaide.

== Recognition ==
On 10 June 1954, he was appointed Sir Alexander Lyell McEwin, KBE for his service as Minister of Health & Mines in South Australia.

His portrait, painted by Sir Ivor Hele hangs in Parliament House.

His name is commemorated in the Lyell McEwin Hospital.

Political offices
Preceded by Tom Stott	Father of the Parliament of South Australia; 1970–1975	Succeeded by Don Dunstan
