= Cec Creedon =

Australian politician (1922–2014)

Cecil William (Cec) Creedon (9 March 1922 – 3 August 2014) was a politician in the State of South Australia.

== History ==
Cecil Creedon was born in Westbury, Tasmania the eldest of four children of Cecil and Adele Creedon. He was educated at a Catholic school in Westbury.

He joined the Royal Australian Air Force in 1941 and worked as a Leading Aircraftman in Laverton, Victoria throughout the Second World War.

He joined the Labor Party in 1948 and remained a member for most of his life. He married in 1946, to Jessie Green from South Australia. They settled in Gawler, South Australia, where he served as a councillor for many years and was Mayor 1972–1978.

He was elected to a Midlands district seat in the Legislative Council for the Labor Party in March 1973 (Labor's first MLC outside the metropolitan area), and remained a member through the change to a single electorate in 1975, retiring in December 1985.

== Family ==
Cecil W. Creedon married Jessie (died 2010) on 23 February 1946; they had one daughter and four sons.
