= Victor George Springett =

Australian politician (1916 – 1990)

Dr. Victor George Springett (28 September 1916 – 8 September 1990) was a politician in the State of South Australia.

He was a medical practitioner in Stawell, Victoria in the 1950s.

He was elected for the Liberal Party to a Southern District seat in the Legislative Council in June 1967 at a by-election called to replace L. H. Densley, and retired in July 1975.

In 1974, while a member of the Legislative Council, he acted as coordinator for a Red Cross team working in Ethiopia.
