= Norman Jude =

Australian politician

Sir Norman Lane Jude (7 April 1905 – 18 February 1975) was a politician in South Australia.

== History ==
Norman Jude was born in Handsworth, Staffordshire to Archibald Alexander Jude and his wife Edith Susan, née Lane (died 1905). He was educated at Stamford School, Lincolnshire, then immigrated to South Australia in 1924, where he was a successful student at Roseworthy College 1924 to 1926, when he graduated with honours in Chemistry and Building. He found employment at Pondyong Station, Meningie, where he was involved in a fatal motorcycle accident.

He was a member of the Legislative Council for the Liberal Party from 29 April 1944 to 17 June 1971, when he resigned. He served as Minister for Railways and Local Government from 1953. He was knighted in 1965.

Jude served on the district committee of the Stockowners' Association, the governing council of the Chamber of Rural Industries and the Naracoorte hospital board, and was also president of the local branch of the National Fitness Council and a physical training instructor at the boys' club. He helped to form and was later president of the south-eastern fire fighting association, belonged to the Volunteer Defence Corps and supported the Australian Red Cross Society. He was a member of the South Australian Jockey Club. Jude was a keen sportsman: at Roseworthy he was involved in cricket and athletics. He later joined a hockey team and played for South Australia in 1930. For many years, he was a regular player at the Naracoorte Golf Club. He was a member of the Naracoorte Stockowners Association, Naracoorte Fire Fighting Association, Naracoorte Roseworthy Old Collegians Association (President in 1939), Narracoorte Tennis Club, and the Naracoorte Cricket Club. He was made a Knight Bachelor in the 1965 Birthday Honours List.

== Family ==
He married Nancy Margaret Bowman on 6 August 1935. Nancy was a wealthy daughter of Keith Dudley Bowman (1881–1932) and granddaughter of John Bowman; they lived at "Carolside", near Naracoorte. They had a son and three daughters, two being twins.
