= Les Hart (politician) =

Australian politician

Leslie Rupert Hart
- Born: 28 December 1909
- Died: 7 January 2002 (aged 92)
- Occupations: Politician; sheep‑breeder
- Known for: Member of the South Australian Legislative Council (1962–1973)

Leslie Rupert Hart (28 December 1909 – 7 January 2002) was a politician in South Australia.

He was the elder son of Edith R. Hart (née Lashmar) and Rupert Rufus Hart, sheep breeder of "Glen Devon", Two Wells. He studied woolclassing at the School of Mines. and with a brother went into partnership with their father as R. R. Hart and Sons, who like fellow parliamentarian Maynard Boyd Dawkins, were successful breeders of Dorset Horn sheep.

He was elected a Liberal candidate to a Midland district seat in the Legislative Council in October 1962 and resigned in March 1973.

== Personal ==
Hart married Lily Edith Poole of Torrensville on 11 October 1941. They had a son, Malcolm, in 1942. This was followed by a daughter Rosemary, and finally another son, Robert.
