= Don Banfield =

Australian trade unionist and politician

Donald Hubert Louis Banfield AO (16 September 1916 – 4 June 2014) was a trade unionist and politician in the State of South Australia.

He was born in Plympton, South Australia and served with the RAAF during World War II.

In 1951 he was secretary of the Boot Trade Employes' Federation.

He was elected for the Labor Party to a Central district No. 1 in March 1965, held the seat through the 1975 elections, when the Legislative Council reverted to election by the State acting as a single electorate, and retired in 1979.

He served as Minister for Health March 1973 to March 1979 and Chief Secretary June 1975 to October 1977; he briefly served as 42nd Attorney-General of South Australia from 15 March 1979 to 30 April 1979.

He was involved with several charitable bodies, notably Orana Incorporated and the Blind Welfare Association of South Australia.

== Personal ==
He married Doreen Biggs; they had sons Robert William on 17 June 1943 and Donald Keith on 31 October 1947; they lived at Aver Avenue, Daw Park, South Australia.

== Recognition ==
He was awarded the Order of Australia for parliamentary service and services to the community in June 1983.

Political offices
| Preceded by Peter Duncan | Attorney-General of South Australia; 1979 | Succeeded by Chris Sumner |
South Australian Legislative Council
| Preceded by Stan Bevan | Member for Central District No. 1; 1965–1975 | District abolished State became single electorate |
