= Henry Kemp (politician) =

Australian politician (1912–1973)

Henry Kenneth Kemp B.Ag.Sc. (25 September 1912 – 29 June 1973), was a politician in South Australia.

== History ==
Henry Kemp was born at Unley Park a son of Herbert Kemp, founder of Kemp's Nurseries at the corner of Unley Road and Cross Road, Kingswood. His three surviving sons were all nurserymen.

Kemp was the first to graduate BSc. with honours from the Agricultural Science Faculty at Roseworthy Agricultural College and was appointed Horticultural Research Officer with South Australian Department of Agriculture. following a commonwealth grant for a study into the apple and pear industry. He enlisted with the RAAF in 1941 By 1946 he had resumed his work and was promoted to Senior Research Officer in 1949. In March 1954 he resigned from the service to concentrate on his orchard and dairy property at Balhannah. He conducted a weekly horticultural column in The Chronicle from June 1954.

He was in June 1964 elected as a Liberal candidate to a Southern district seat in the Legislative Council, and died in office.

== Family ==
Herbert Kemp ( – after 1935) and his wife Susannah Jane Kemp, née Spackman ( – 10 December 1935) married 1901, lived at Kingswood. Established Unley Park Nursery in 1890 and later the Kingswood Nursery. Purchased land at 7 Kemp Road, Aldgate from the estate of Henry Sewell (died 1926) in 1927. He transferred the land to son Robert in 1929.

- Herbert John "Jack" Kemp (1905 – ) married Kathleen Carlton of Dundee on 1 March 1928; divorced 1938. He married again to Muriel Rosina Turnbull of Cowell in 1938. He stood as LCL candidate against F. H. Walsh for the large safe Labor seat of Goodwood in 1947 and was narrowly defeated. He was commodore of the Royal SA Yacht Squadron in 1949, and as "Grevillea" wrote a gardening column for the Adelaide Advertiser and Sunday Mail.
- Robert Frewer Kemp (1908 – April 1972) married Bettie Delores Stevens in 1929. His father passed Aldgate property to him in 1929. He was mayor of Stirling Council 1940. Passed the Aldgate property to son Peter c. 1970.

- Peter Kemp ( – )

- Henry "Harry" Kemp (25 September 1912 – 29 June 1973) subject of this article
- Howard Richard Kemp (1915 – 22 June 1935) was a student at Roseworthy Agricultural College, where he died after choking on a portion of orange.
