= Stan Bevan =

Australian trade unionist and politician

Stanley Charles Bevan (14 October 1901 – 19 September 1987) was a politician in the State of South Australia.

== History ==
Bevan joined the Liquor Trades Union aged 16, later joined the Timber Workers' Union, and was its president for four years. In 1941 he was elected secretary of the South Australian branch of the Miscellaneous Workers' Union, and in 1947 the Federal Secretary.

He was elected president of the Trades and Labor Council in 1951. In the same year, he was elected unopposed as a Labor member of the South Australian Legislative Council for Central District No. 1, following the September death of Oscar Oates. He retained the seat until May 1970.

== Family ==
He was married and had three children.
