= Frank Kneebone =

Australian politician

The Honourable Frank Kneebone

Member of the Legislative Council of South Australia
- In office 16 September 1961 – 12 July 1975
- Preceded by: Frank Condon

Personal details
- Born: Alfred Francis Kneebone; 16 November 1905 Coolgardie, Western Australia
- Died: 18 February 2004 (aged 98) Semaphore Park, South Australia
- Party: Labor Party
- Parent: Harry Kneebone (father)

Alfred Francis Kneebone (16 November 1905 – 18 February 2004), known as Frank Kneebone, was a politician in the state of South Australia. He represented the Labor Party in Central District No. 1 of the Legislative Council of South Australia from 1961 to 1975.

== History ==
Kneebone was born in Coolgardie, Western Australia, the second son of journalist Harry Kneebone who later became a member of the House of Assembly and then a Senator for South Australia. Alfred (known as Frank) was elected to the South Australian Legislative Council for Labor at a by-election held on 16 September 1961, filling the seat made vacant by the death of Frank Condon. He briefly held the post of Minister of Railways in 1965; Labour and Industry and Minister of Transport 1965–1968; Minister of Irrigation, Lands and Repatriation 1970–1975. He served as Chief Secretary 1973–1975. He held the seat until July 1975, when by the Act of 1973 the Council reverted to being elected by the State as a single electorate.

He died on 18 February 2004 (aged 98).
