= Boyd Dawkins =

Australian politician (1917–1996)

Hon. M.B. Dawkins MBE
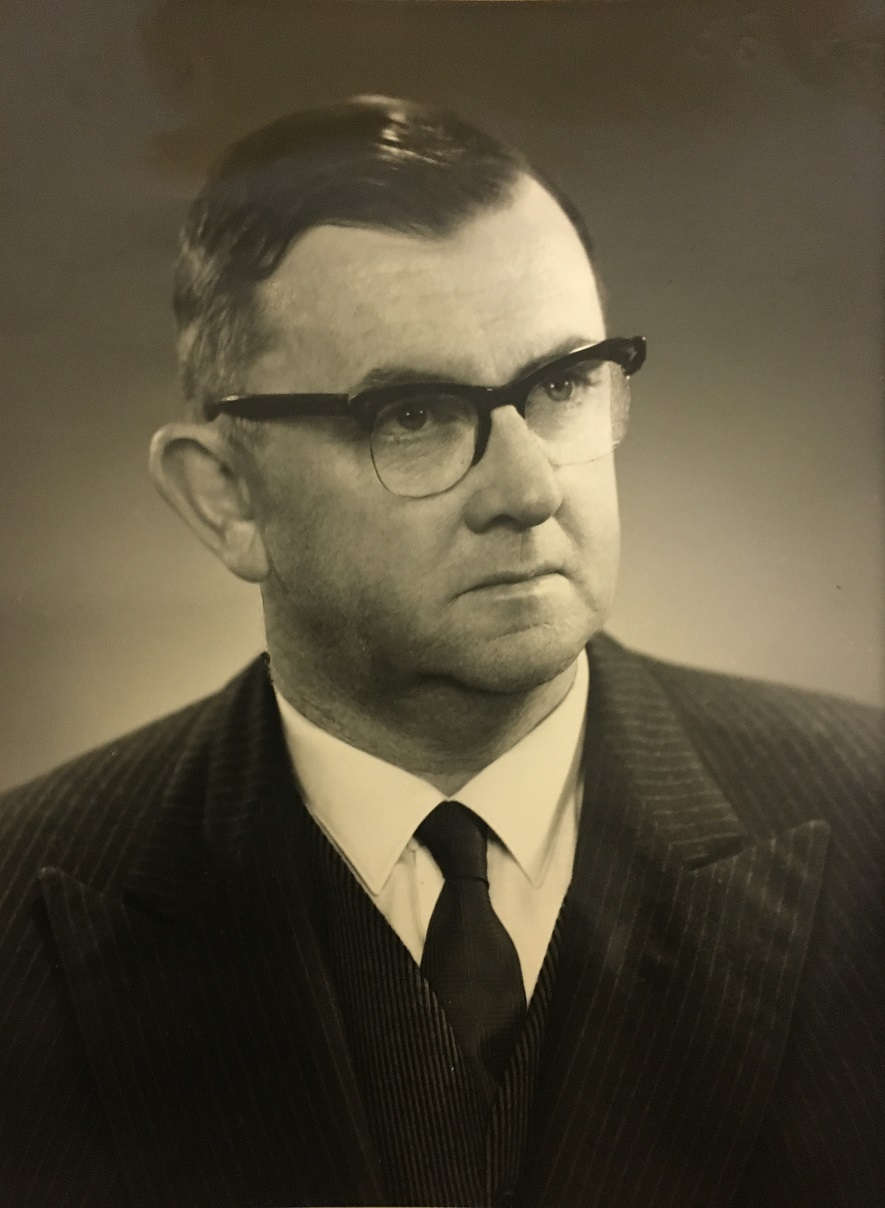

Member of the South Australian Legislative Council
- In office March 1962 – November 1982

Personal details
- Born: Maynard Boyd Dawkins; 2 January 1917 Stirling, South Australia
- Died: 21 October 1996 (aged 79) Adelaide, South Australia
- Resting place: Gawler River, South Australia
- Party: Liberal and Country League
- Spouse: Constance Lilian Wilkinson (m. 1943)
- Relations: John Sydney Dawkins (cousin)
- Children: John Samuel Letts Dawkins
- Occupation: Farmer and politician

Maynard Boyd Dawkins MBE (2 January 1917 – 21 October 1996) was a classically trained musician, sheep breeder and Liberal politician in the State of South Australia.

== History ==
Dawkins was the only son of Gawler River farmer Albert Maynard Dawkins and his wife Mary (née Yeoman). He was born at the small Mount Lofty private hospital which was operated by his uncle, Dr Sydney Letts Dawkins. The Dawkins family were early settlers of Gawler and were well known in the area.

He studied at Roseworthy Agricultural College, following in the footsteps of his father who was part of the first intake of students at Roseworthy in 1885 and also later chairman of the college's Governing Council. Dawkins was, like fellow parliamentarian Leslie Rupert Hart, a breeder of Dorset Horns and was also a respected judge of British Breed sheep.

Following the outbreak of WWII, Dawkins joined the Army and undertook initial training at Warradale, before having to return to the farm due to his father's poor health. In 1943, Dawkins married Constance Wilkinson in her local Berri Methodist Church. In the same year, he took over management of the farm and later changed the name of both the property and its sheep stud from 'Euro Gardens' to 'Leamington', named for Leamington Spa in Warwickshire from which the Dawkins family migrated to South Australia in 1839.

Dawkins was elected as the councillor for Gawler River Ward in the District Council of Mudla Wirra in 1954 and held that position until 1968, serving as chairman in 1965-67.

He was president of the Gawler Men's Branch of the Liberal and Country League, and was a successful Liberal candidate for a Midland seat on the Legislative Council in March 1962. He made the transition to the new Legislative Council in July 1975 when, by the Act of 1973, the State reverted to voting as one electorate, with proportional representation. He retired in November 1982.

A significant legacy of Dawkins' time in Parliament was as one of the earliest advocates for treated wastewater from Bolivar being utilised for irrigation and, subsequently, the substantial growth of horticultural industries on the Adelaide Plains.

Late in his political career, Dawkins was also proud to serve as the inaugural president of the SA Parliamentary Christian Fellowship, a bipartisan and non-denominational association he established in 1982 with Labor MP Lynn Arnold.

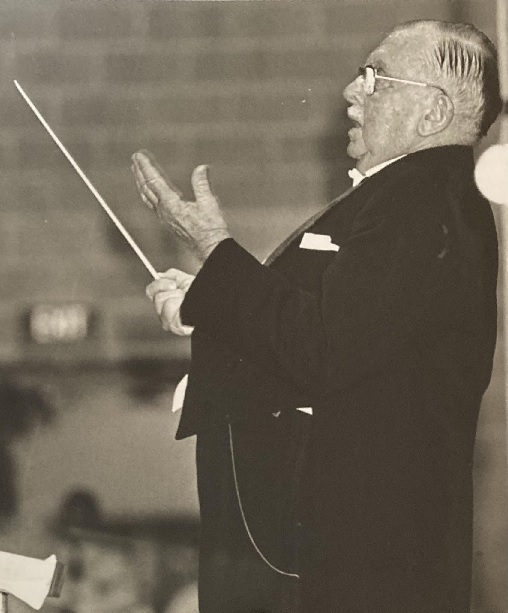
Boyd Dawkins was a renowned choirmaster and vocalist.

== Other interests ==
Following family traditions, Dawkins was a teetotaller, an active member of the Band of Hope and a Methodist lay preacher. Dawkins' father was also a long-time lay preacher, while his maternal grandfather, Rev Richard Carylon Yeoman, was an ordained Minister from Cornwall who served Bible Christian and Methodist Church circuits across SA's northern areas. Dawkins was also an avowed constitutional monarchist.

Dawkins was a fine bass-baritone and was a member of the Adelaide Philharmonic Choir, having studied under Clifford Lathlean. He ultimately earned a Licentiate of the Royal Schools of Music (L.R.S.M.), an advanced professional diploma, from the Elder Conservatorium of Music in Adelaide. He was also a great promoter of choral music, serving as the long-term leader and conductor of the highly regarded Gawler-Barossa Oratorio Choir and, from 1964, as the founding President of the South Australian Country Choral Association for 27 years. He was a regular bass soloist with the ABC for 15 vears, and appeared with both the Adelaide and West Australia symphony orchestras.

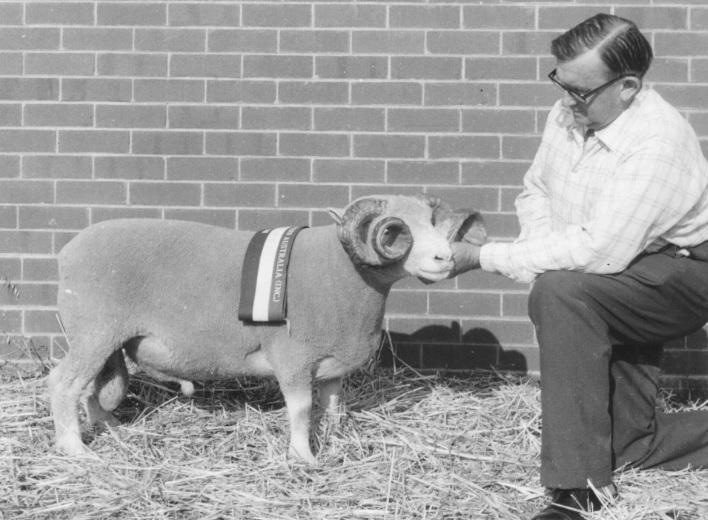
Boyd Dawkins with a 'Leamington' Dorset Horn ram.

In 1983, Dawkins was made a Member of the Order of the British Empire (MBE) in recognition of his services to music and the community. In his later years, Dawkins continued his active interest in his family's farming and stud breeding pursuits. He also maintained his commitment to the Liberal Party, particularly the local Gawler branches and the party's Rural Council. In addition, he continued his life-long interest in cricket and support for the Norwood Football Club.

== Personal ==
Dawkins married Constance Lilian Wilkinson on 24 August 1943. They subsequently had two sons, Ross (born in 1946) and John (1954). John followed his father as a member of the Legislative Council from 1997 until 2022. On 8 September 2020, John was elected President of the Legislative Council, serving until 19 March 2022.

A Dawkins family relative, John Sydney Dawkins, was a politician representing the Australian Labor Party and served as Federal Treasurer from 1991 to 1993. John Sydney Dawkins' father, Alec Letts Dawkins, was the first cousin of Maynard Boyd Dawkins.
