= Bert Shard =

Australian politician

Albert James Shard AO (13 August 1902 – 29 November 1991) was a politician in the State of South Australia.

== History ==
Bert Shard was born in Maldon, Victoria to Henry Shard (died 12 June 1928) and Charlotte Warren "Lot" Shard, née Peake, (ca.1870 – 20 February 1953) and left school at age 14, by which time he was living in Broken Hill. He worked in many jobs: as a barber's boy, shop assistant, cordial factory employee, bitumen spreader, and in a fruit packing shed at Merbein in 1919. The big strike of that year forced his parents to leave Broken Hill, and they moved to 3 Vine Street Prospect. In 1922, he was a shop assistant, and in 1924 he started driving a bread cart for Nicholls Bros. of Nailsworth. In 1927 he was fined £11/10/ for his part in an illegal gambling operation at the Northern Hotel, Enfield.

He was a delegate to ALP Council meetings from 1928 as the representative of the Breadcarters' Union, and in 1936 became their full-time secretary, and greatly increased the influence of that organisation. He became a member of the Australian Labor Party executive in 1940, and held that position for many years.

In 1944 he was elected to the Prospect seat in the House of Assembly. At the declaration of the poll in 1944 he made a forceful attack on the Communist Party and its leader Dr. Alan Finger, who was one of his opponents. He served for a year as a Government representative on the board of the University of Adelaide, then lost his seat in Parliament at the following election in 1947.

In 1949 he was elected secretary of the Trades and Labor Council, and in 1940 elected secretary of the Trades Hall management committee and secretary of the Labor Day celebration committee. In 1949, as a moderate, he deposed Tom Garland (a former Communist) as secretary of the Trades and Labor Council, winning the election by 17 votes. The same year, he was made treasurer of the Breadcarters' Union, and held that position for many years. In 1951 he represented Australian workers at the International Labour Organization conference at Geneva, and during that trip attended a garden party at Buckingham Palace, which infuriated some of members of Trades Hall. In 1953 he represented the ACTU at the New Zealand Federation of Labor conference.

In February 1956 he was elected to the Legislative Council as a member for Central No. 1 district, and held the seat until July 1975.

Shard was made an Officer of the Order of Australia (AO) in the 1977 Australia Day Honours for service to government.

== Other interests ==
He played lawn bowls and was for a time president of the Broadview Bowling Club.

He was a longtime supporter of junior football clubs in the North Adelaide district and a follower of the North Adelaide Football Club, and a committee member from 1940 to 1947, then was reelected in 1950.

== Family ==
He married Muriel Mavis Whiting in 1927; they had two sons:

- Bruce Walter Shard (1928–1999)
- Ross David Shard (10 September 1929 – )

They lived at Goldfinch Avenue, Cowandilla in 1925 and at 6 Le Cornu Street Broadview in 1950.

He had an older brother Walter Henry Shard (c. 1893 – 4 December 1951), born in Bendigo, worked and died in Broken Hill. Other siblings were Evelyn, Bessie and Leonard.
