= Ross Story =

Australian politician

Clarence Ross Story (16 January 1920 – 9 May 1991), was a farmer and politician in the State of South Australia.

== History ==
Story was born to Frank W. Story (January 1890 – ) and Mrs. Story (née Ross) of Renmark, at St. Peters, South Australia. He served in World War II, and was a fruitgrower and nurseryman in Renmark. He was a member of the Renmark North and Chaffey Agricultural Bureau and was president of the Upper Murray Ex-servicemen's Land Settlement Association and a member of the Loxton Soldiers' Settlement Advisory Committee and an active member of the Renmark sub-branch of the Returned Services League.

He was a Liberal and Country League candidate at both the 1950 and 1953 elections for the seat of Chaffey, but was unable to shift the sitting member, Independent William MacGillivray.

He was elected to a Midland seat on the Legislative Council in February 1955 to fill a seat made vacant by the death of Reginald Rudall, and held it until July 1975.

In 1981 he was made a Companion of the Order of St Michael and St George (CMG).
