= Richard Geddes =

Australian politician

Richard Alexander Geddes (5 November 1921 – 12 August 1992) was a politician in the State of South Australia.

== Early life ==
He was born a son of James Sim Geddes (1877–1931), a timber merchant and three times mayor of Port Pirie, and his wife, (Mary) Mildred Geddes, née Giles (died 22 October 1951).

He had four brothers - Charles Owen Geddes, grazier of Melrose; Peter Henry Giles Geddes of Port Lincoln, (James) Owen Geddes MBE, of Port Pirie; and Robert Grant Geddes, who was killed in action in 1941. Richard and these last three were conspicuous in the 2nd AIF during World War II.

== Later years ==
He served in the 2nd AIF during World War II, and as Lieutenant Geddes. He was the Governor of Sarawak for a short time and was awarded an MBE in 1947.

He was elected for the Liberal Party to a Northern districts seat in the Legislative Council in March 1965, survived the transition to single-electorate voting in 1975, and retired in September 1979.

== Family ==
He married Corporal Pamela Hartley Williams on 28 November 1944 at St. Peter's College Chapel and they later lived at Eden Valley. They had four children, all of whom are believed living today.
