= Arthur Whyte =

Arthur Mornington Whyte AM (12 March 1921 – 15 December 2014) was a politician in the State of South Australia.

== History ==
He was born in Adelaide, a son of William F. Whyte of "Yeltana" station, Kimba.

He served with the 2/48th Battalion of the Australian Army during World War II, and was one of the "Rats of Tobruk".

He was elected for the Liberal Party to a Northern districts seat in the Legislative Council in October 1966 at a by-election brought about by the death of C. D. Octoman, and retired in November 1985. He served as President of the South Australian Legislative Council from February 1978 until his retirement.

He was in 1974 a charter member of Kimba Lions Club.

He was awarded the AM in 1987.

He lived at "Yeltana", Kimba and was a Justice of the Peace. He died at the age of 93 on 15 December 2014.

== Family ==
He married Mary ca. June 1944; their children were Caroline, Annette Patricia (6 September 1951 – ), Martin and Nola.
