= Ren DeGaris =

Australian politician

Renfrey Curgenven De Garis AM (12 October 1921 – 5 February 2007), generally known as "Ren DeGaris", was a businessman, pastoralist and politician in the State of South Australia.

== History ==
He was born at "Tremorvah", Millicent, a son of Ralph Edwin DeGaris and Mrs DeGaris née Curgenven.

On leaving college, he worked for the Millicent branch of the family firm of DeGaris, Sons & Co., (in 1947 merged into Elder, Smith and Co.) stock and station agents of Naracoorte.

He enlisted with the RAAF in 1941. His younger brother William Sowden DeGaris, also with the RAAF, was killed over Germany in 1945.

He served as councillor with the Millicent District Council from 1948 to 1954.

He was elected in December 1962 for the Liberal and Country League (Liberal Party) to a Southern district seat in the Legislative Council, and remained a member, through the reversion in 1975 of that House to a single constituency, until November 1985. He served as Chief Secretary, Minister for Health and Minister for Mines from April 1968 to June 1970. As Leader of the Legislative Council, he clashed with Premier Steele Hall, a fellow Liberal, over the latter's plan to reform the franchise of the Upper House, a move that severely disadvantaged his own party's gerrymander.

== Recognition ==
He was appointed a Member of the Order of Australia (AM) in June 1981 "In recognition of service to the community and to parliament and government".

== Family ==
He married Norma Florence Willson, of Penneshaw, Kangaroo Island, around 1950.

Political offices
Preceded by Don Dunstan	Father of the Parliament of South Australia; 1979–1985	Succeeded by Murray Hill
