= Frank Potter (politician) =

Australian politician

Frank Jacques Potter (12 June 1919 – 26 February 1978) was a politician in the State of South Australia.

Frank was born in Rose Park, the eldest son of Frank H. Potter, and was educated at Adelaide Technical High School. He studied law at the University of Adelaide and served his articles with A. J. Hannan KC, and was called to the Bar in 1948.

His legal studies were interrupted during World War II, when he served as a clerk with the Army Legal Corps, and as a staff sergeant married Nancy Searle of Highgate on 3 June 1944.

He was elected to a Central district seat in the South Australian Legislative Council for the Liberal and Country League in 1959. In 1975, with the amendments to the Electoral Act, he was elected to the unified Council, and was made its President of the South Australian Legislative Council, holding that position until his death in 1978.
