= Jessie Cooper =

Australian politician

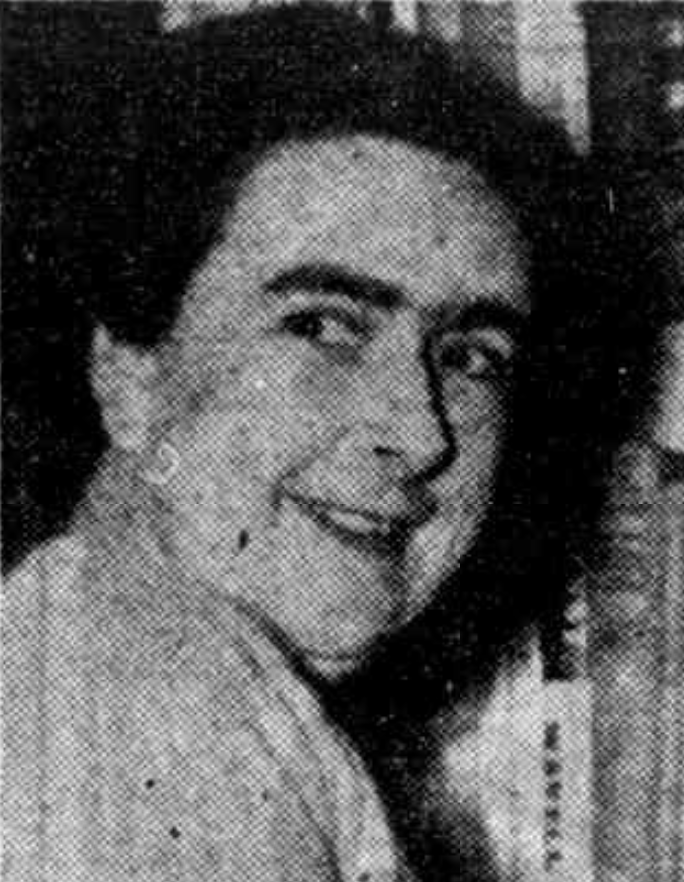

Member of the South Australian Legislative Council
- In office 1959–1979

Personal details
- Born: 29 June 1914 Sydney, Australia
- Died: 28 December 1993 (aged 79)
- Party: Liberal and Country League

Jessie Mary Cooper (née McAndrew; 29 June 1914 – 28 December 1993) was elected as a Liberal and Country League representative to the South Australian Legislative Council at the 1959 election. She was one of the first two women elected to the Parliament of South Australia, along with Joyce Steele who was elected to the House of Assembly on the same day. She served until her retirement in 1979.

== Pre-parliament ==
Jessie McAndrew was born and grew up in Sydney. She married Geoffrey D T Cooper, who was the youngest appointed Australian Lieutenant Colonel in World War II, commanding officer of the 2/27th, and a fourth generation member of the Adelaide Cooper family (Coopers Brewery). They had one son who qualified M.B.B.S. and PhD and worked in immunology research before taking his father's seat on the Cooper's board of directors in 1989 and working as a general medical practitioner.

== Entering parliament ==
Ironically, South Australia was the last state to elect a female representative; at the 1896 election, South Australian women became the first in Australia to be given the right to vote and the first in the world to be given the right to stand for election to Parliament. Cooper and Joyce Steele were elected to the Parliament of South Australia at the 1959 election.

In 1959, attempts were still being made to prevent women entering Parliament. In an action brought by Frank Chapman and Arthur Cockington, Jessie Cooper and Margaret Scott (the Liberal party and Labor party candidates respectively, running for the Legislative Council in the South Australian election), had to show that they were "persons" in the sense intended by the State Constitution to be eligible to stand. The South Australian Supreme Court found in their favour and Jessie Cooper went on to win a seat in the Legislative Council.

Reporters asked Joyce Steele and Jessie Cooper how they would combine their domestic duties with politics: Steele said that she would have to get a housekeeper to help with the housework, while Cooper replied that "she would fit in her housework in the same way as a male member fitted in the running of an orchard or an accountant's office." (Sydney Morning Herald, 9 March 1959. p. 1)

Molly Byrne was Labor's first female elected to the Parliament of South Australia, at the 1965 election, and the third behind Steele and Cooper.

== See also ==
- Women and government in Australia
- Women in the South Australian Legislative Council
