= North Terrace Cultural Boulevard =

Cultural region in Adelaide, South Australia

Coordinates: 34°55′17″S 138°35′59″E

North Terrace and its northern environs is a culturally significant area of Adelaide, South Australia.

== Jubilee 150 Walkway ==
The Walkway now comprises 154 plaques containing the names and deeds of 174 people, plus the first and last plaques.

The plaques are arranged in mostly alphabetic order, and stretch from King William Road to Pulteney Street along the north side of North Terrace. The walkway starts at the South African War Memorial, and passes in front of Government House, the National War Memorial, the State Library, the Museum, the Art Gallery and the University of Adelaide. This portion of North Terrace also contains more than a dozen statues, busts and other memorial plaques, plus numerous public seating benches, some drinking fountains and some water features in front of the Museum and Art Gallery.

In 2011 the Adelaide City Council reorganised the area in front of Government House (between King William Road and the National War Memorial). The plaques and the major statues were not moved, but the avenue of gas lamps was removed, the various busts were moved from King William Road to an area between the statues of Venere Di Canova and Matthew Flinders, and a bust of Sir Lawrence Bragg was added to the group.

== King William Street ==
The very corner is occupied by the South African War Memorial. Also on that corner, starting from the gatehouse and walking SE, were (prior to 2011) the busts of Sir Thomas John Mellis Napier, Mary Lee and Sir Mark Oliphant, all of whom have plaques on the walkway. These busts have been moved further east to the vicinity of the bust of Lord Florey.

=== South African War Memorial ===
South African Boer War Memorial by A. Jones 1904

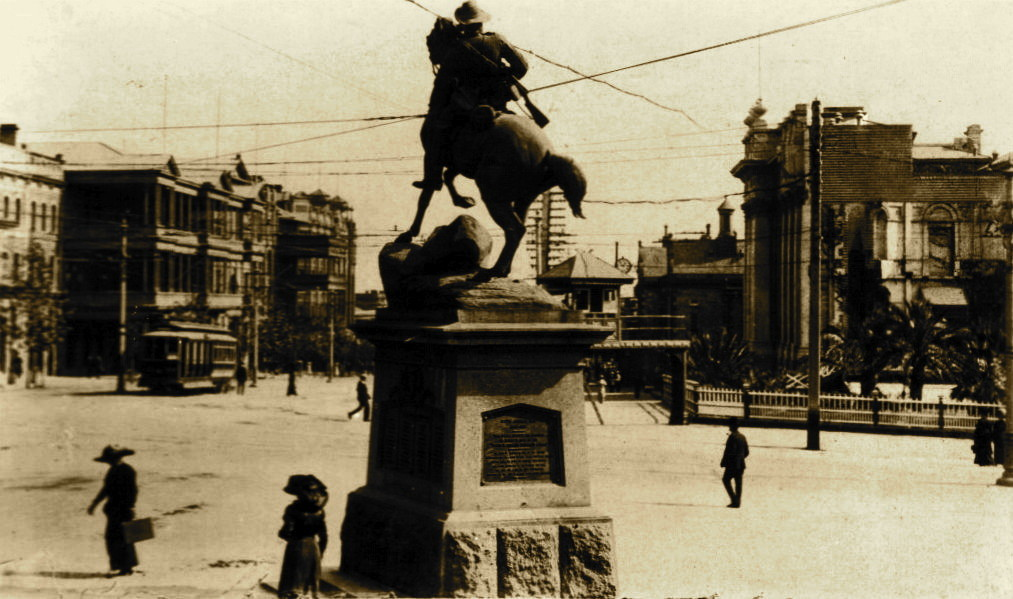
Circa 1926

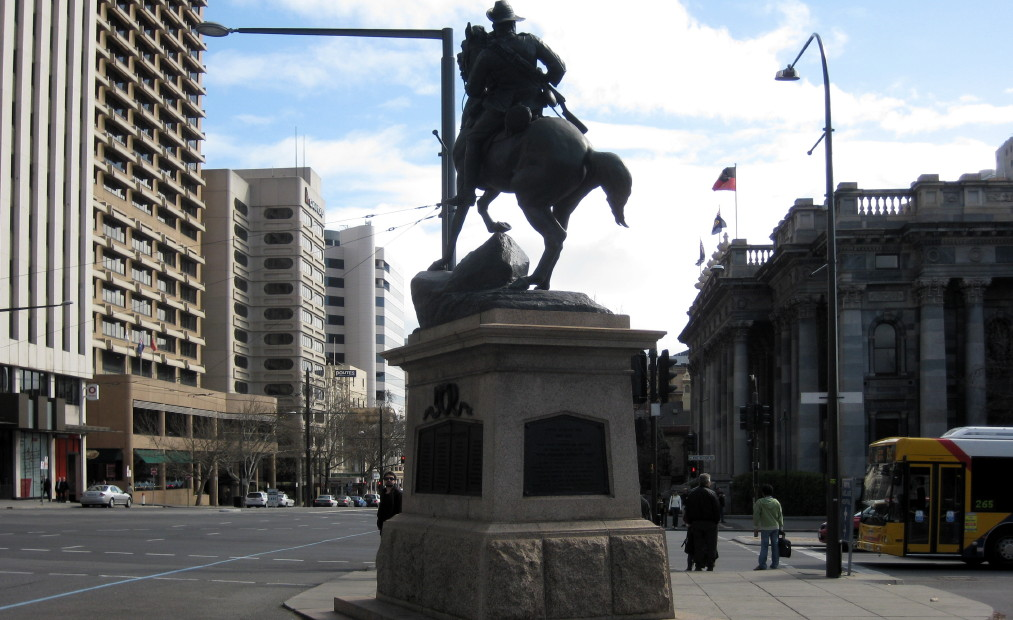
Circa 2008

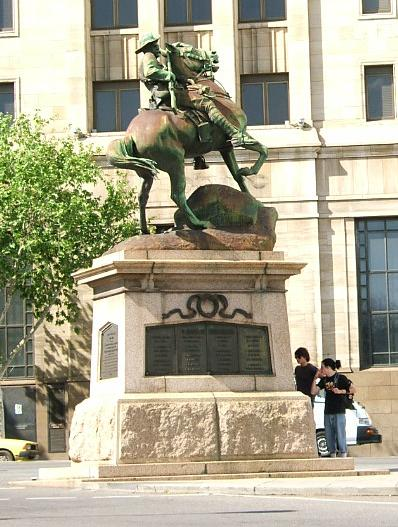

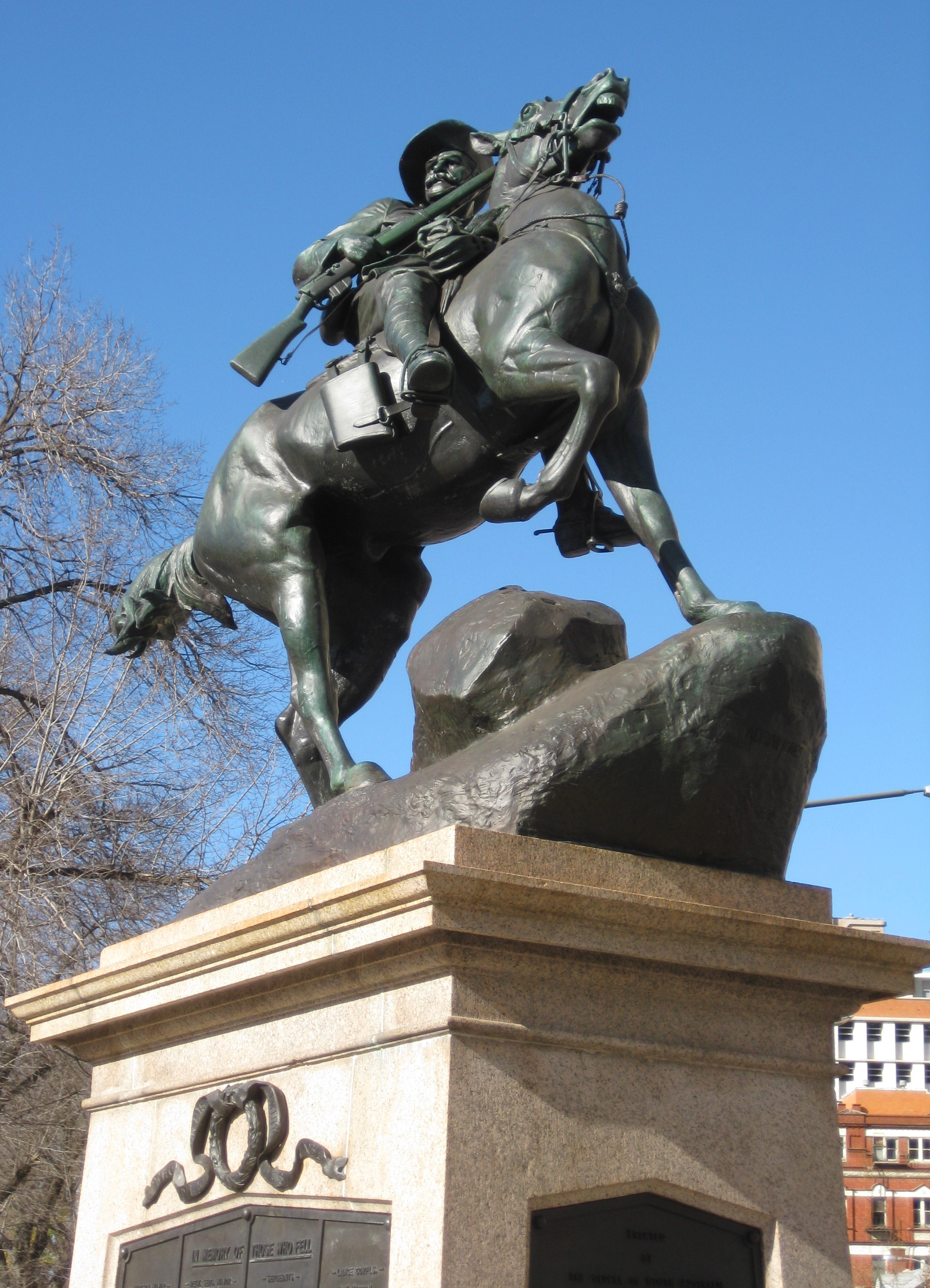

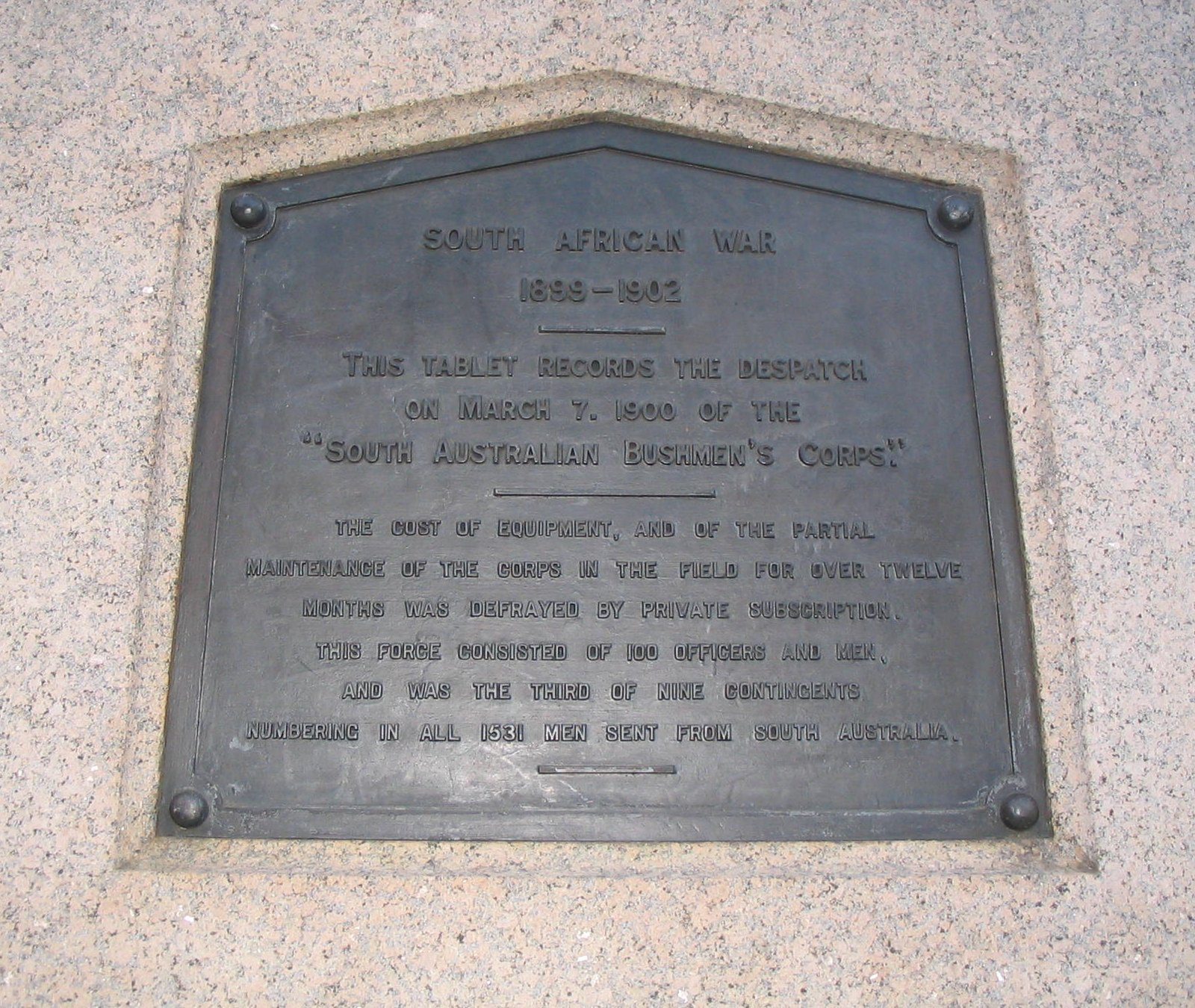

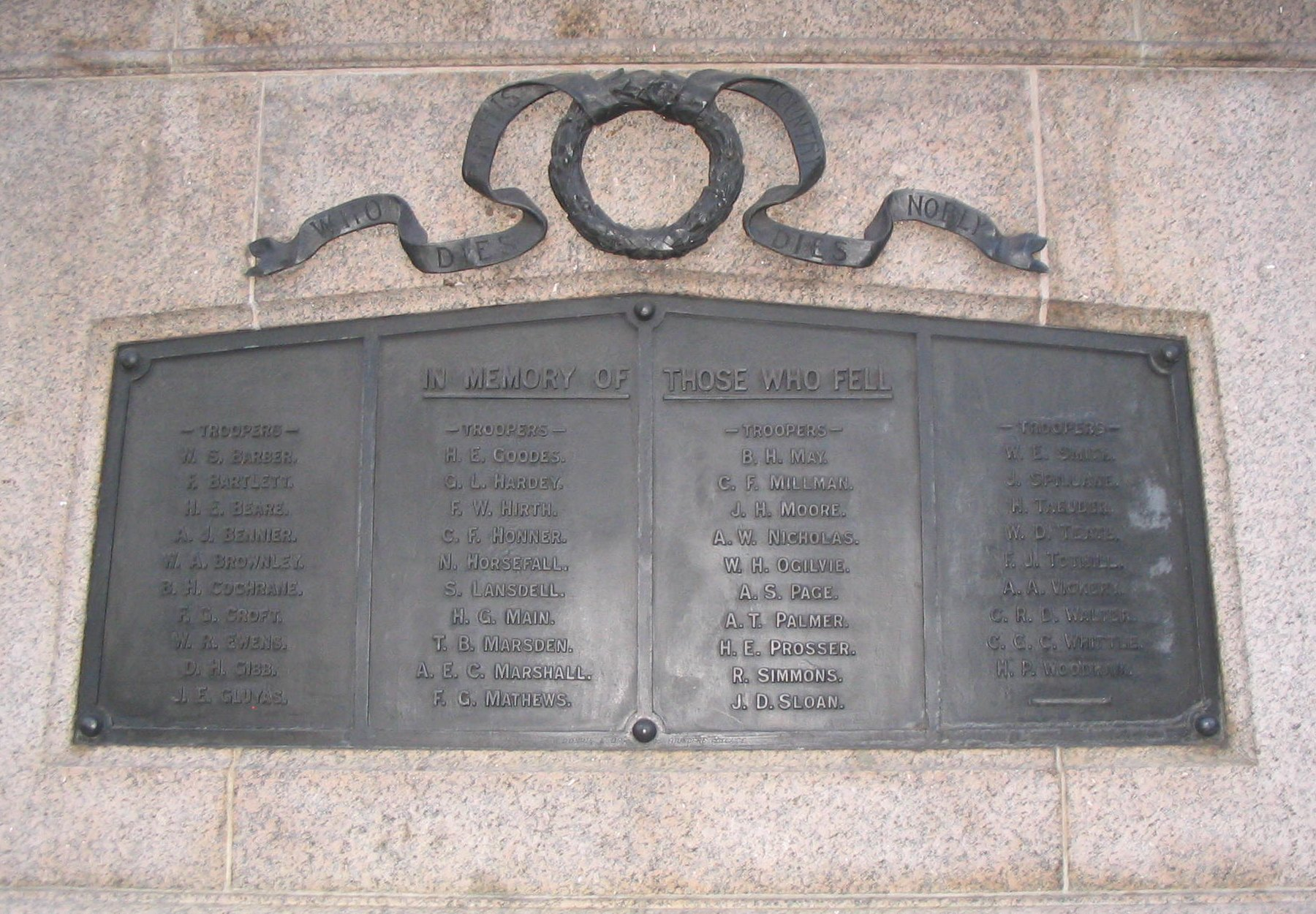

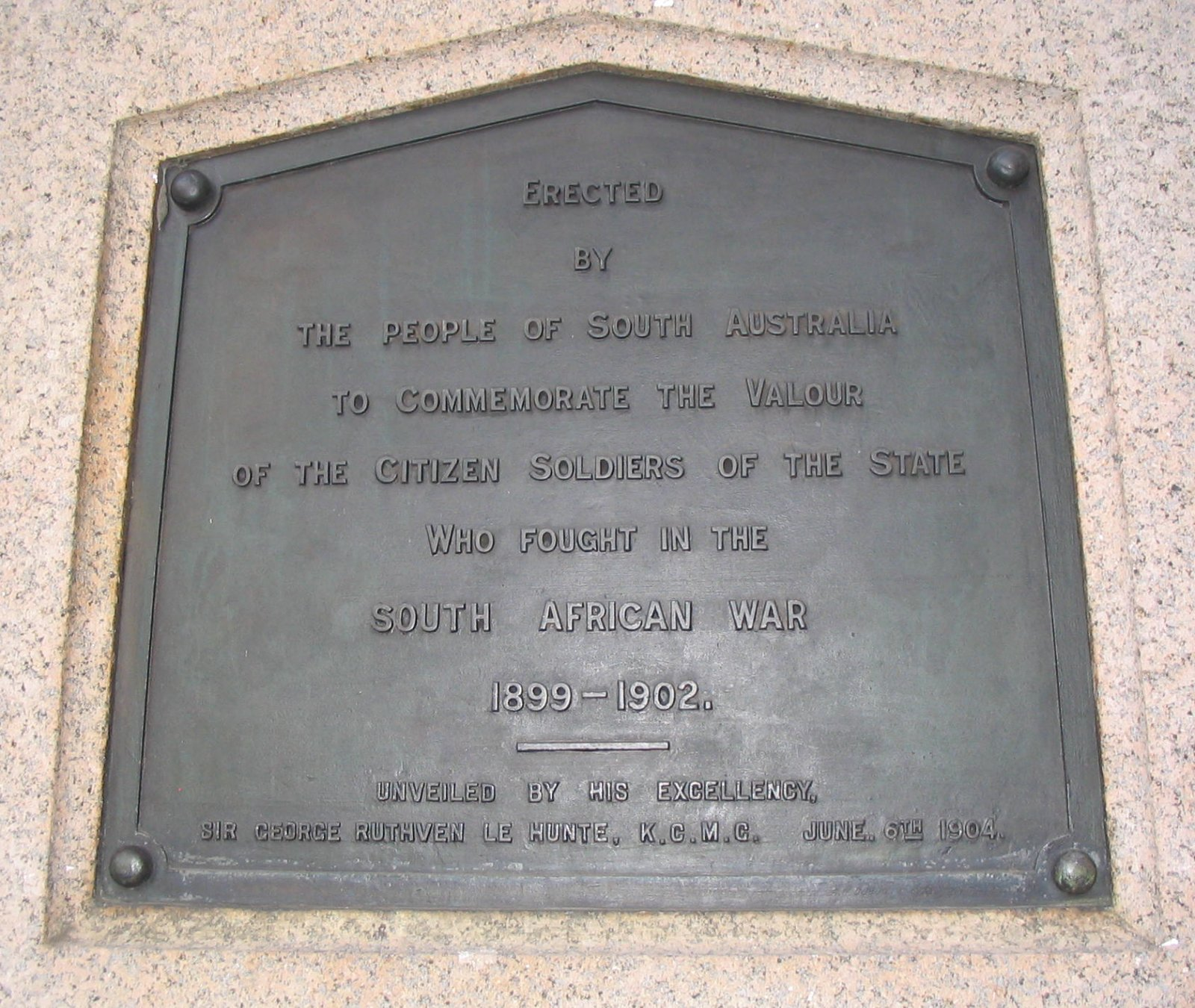

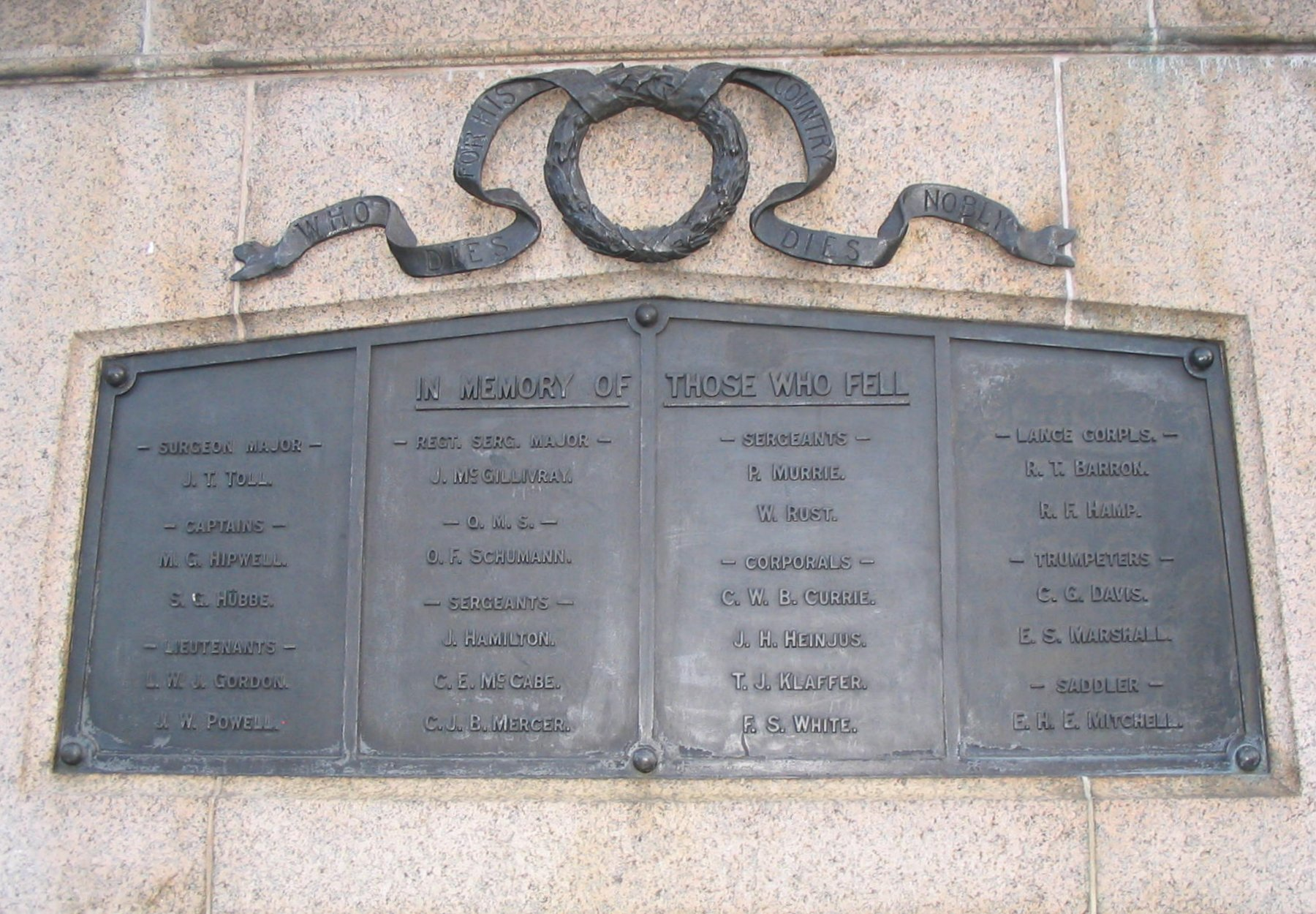

=== Government House ===
This section of North Terrace in front of Government House was named the Prince Henry Gardens in 1934 to honour a visit by Prince Henry, the third son of George V, and later 11th governor-general of Australia.

Prior to 2011, running along the fence of Government House, there was an "Avenue of Gas Lamps". This has been replaced by a broader footpath.

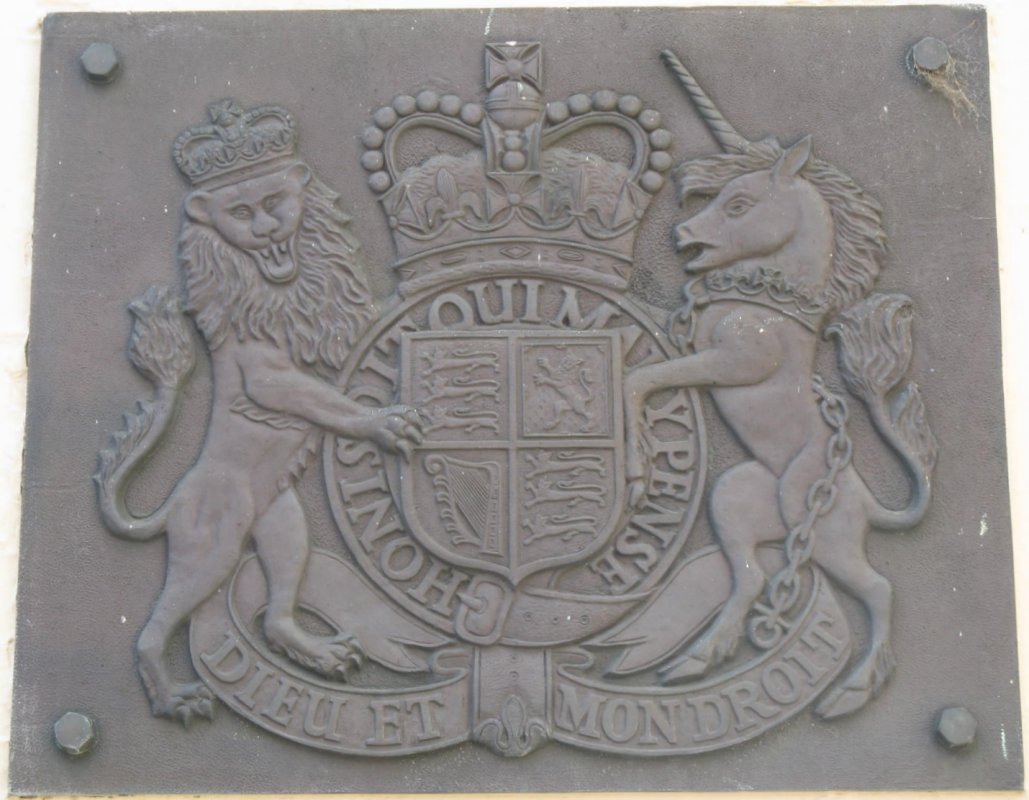

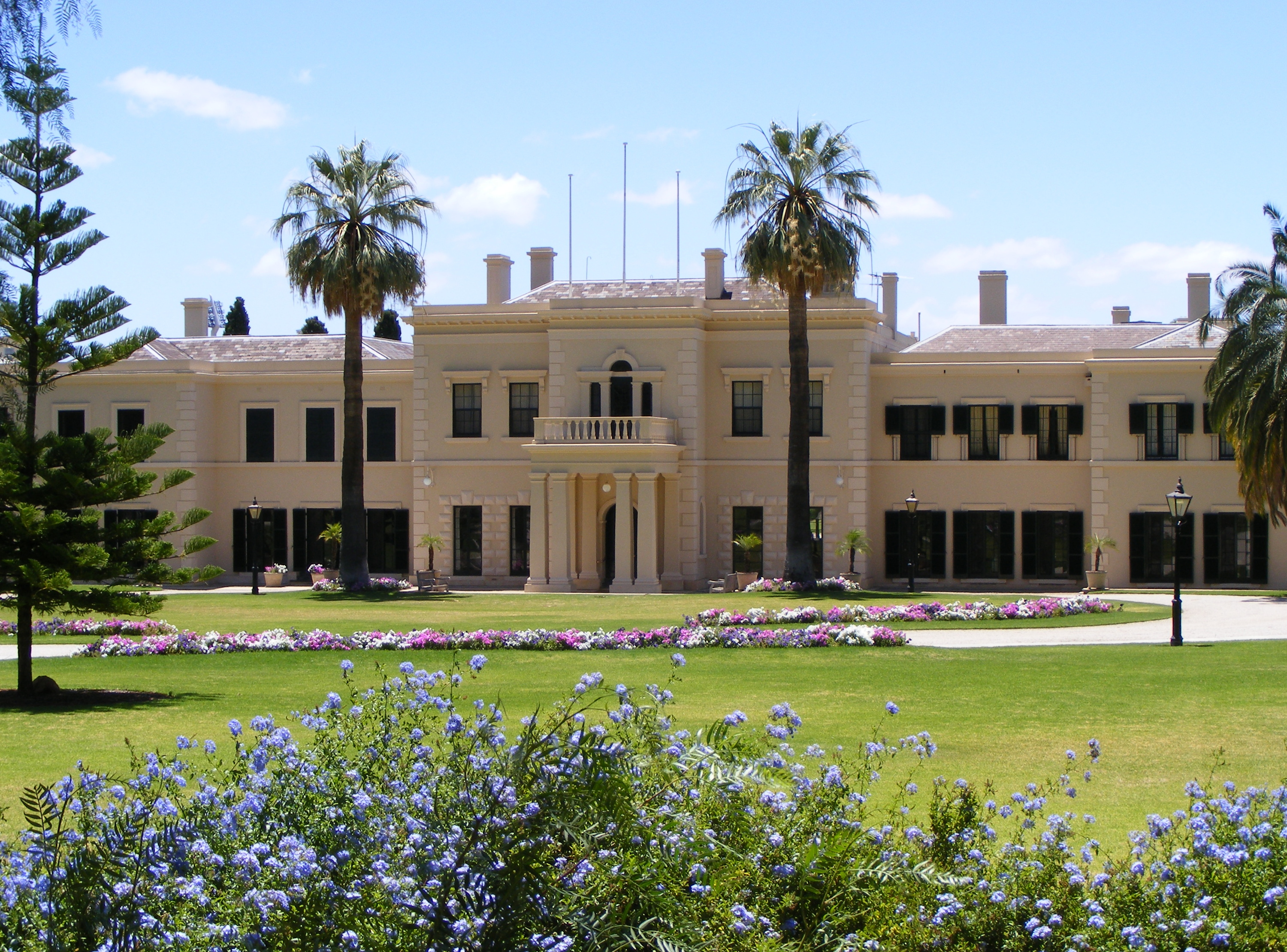

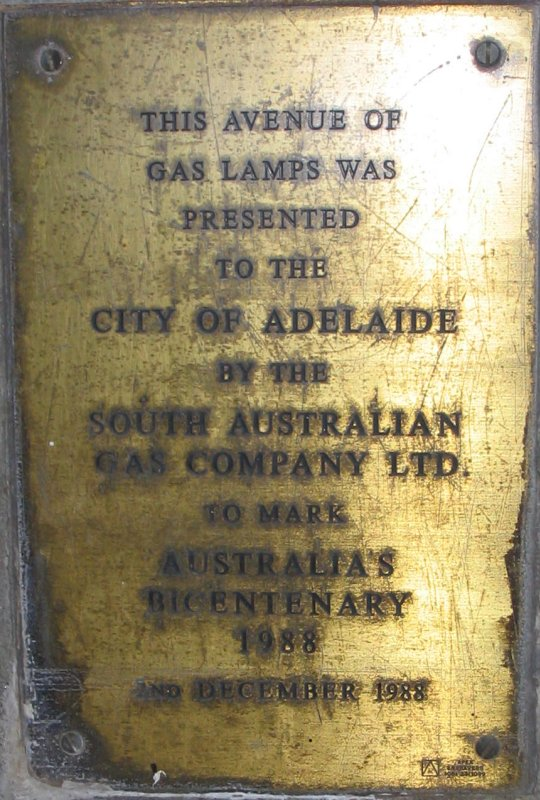
1988 plaque

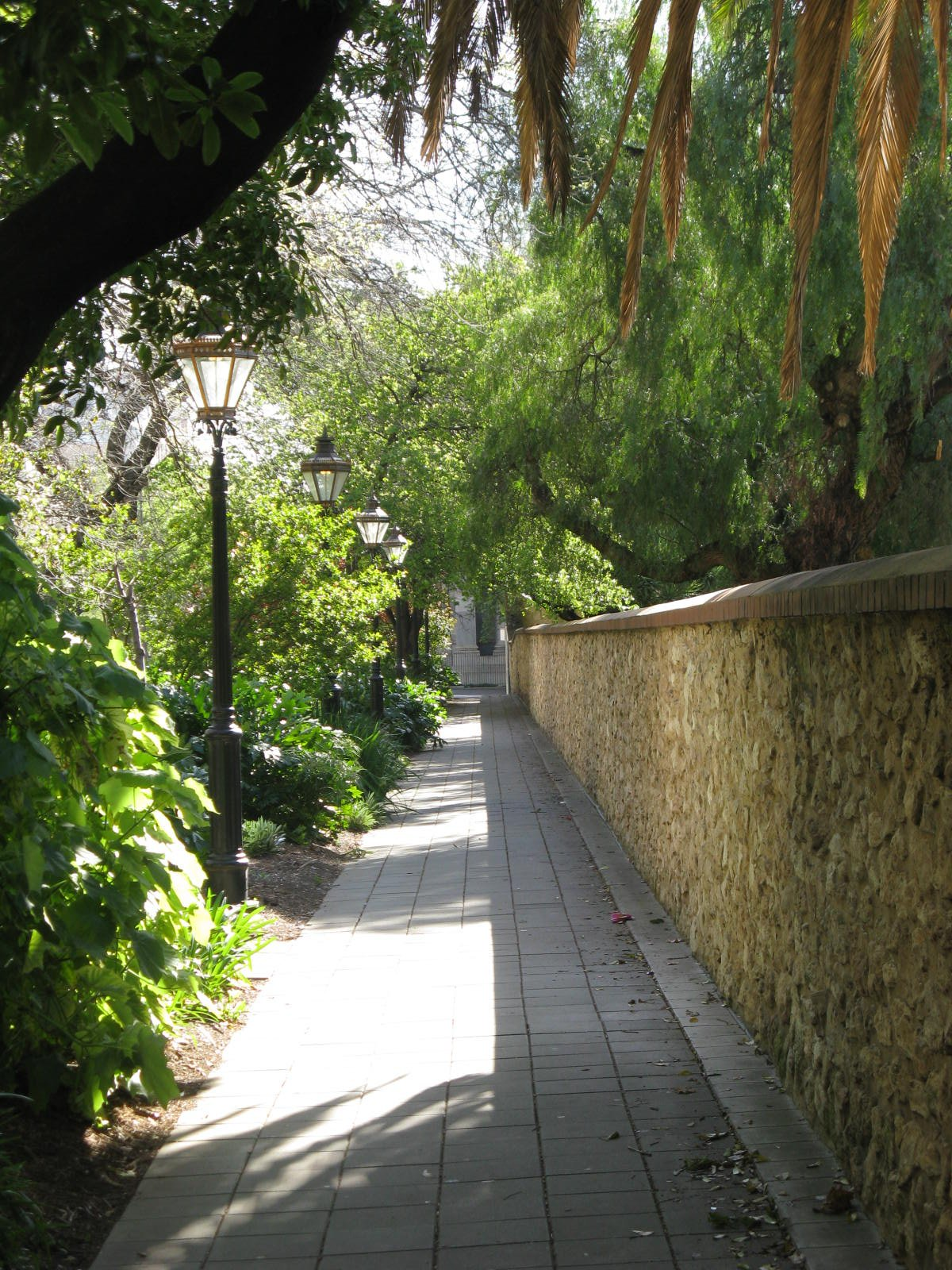
Gas Lamps in 2008

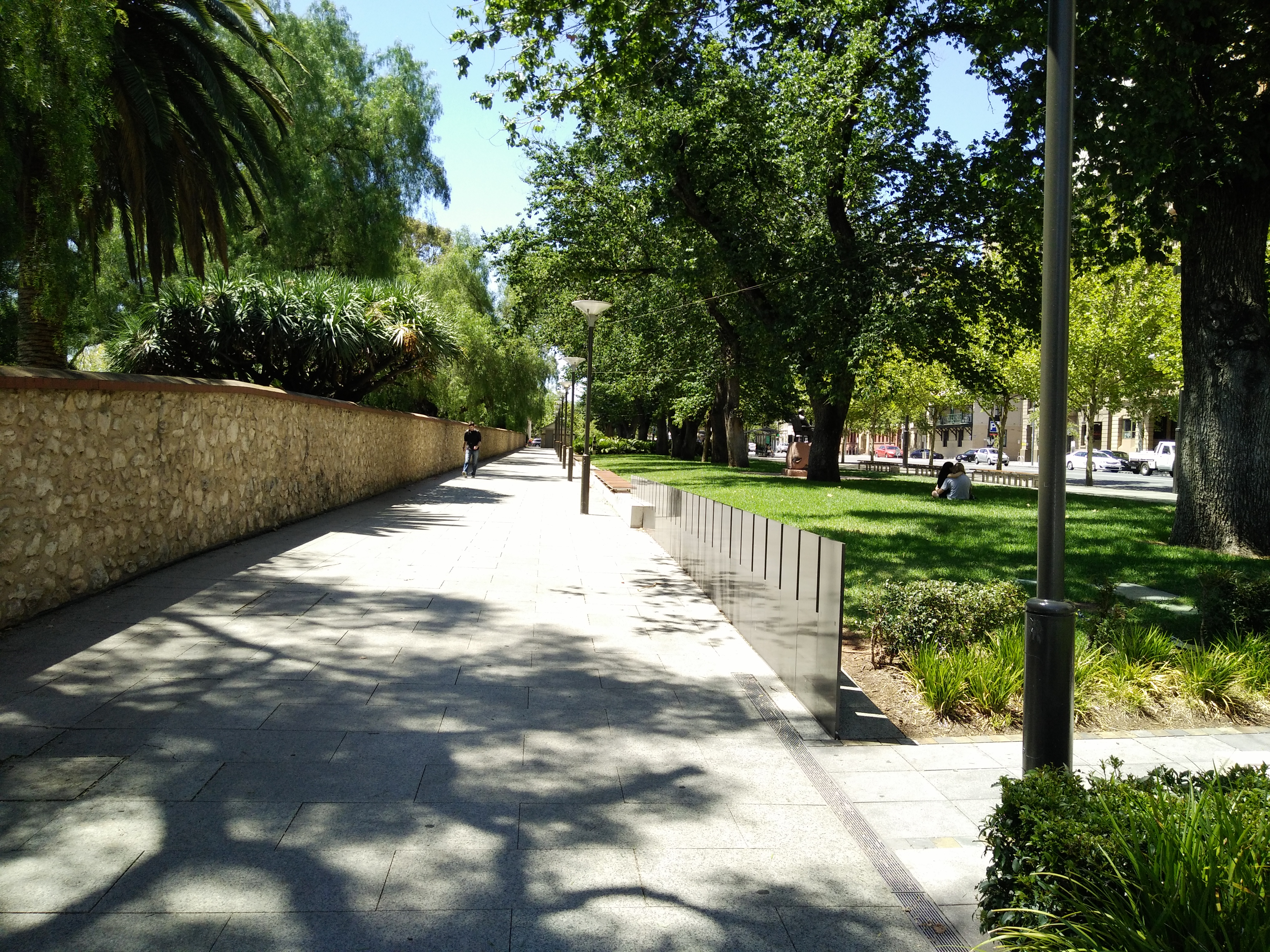
Footpath in 2017

=== Statue of Dame Roma Mitchell ===
The Honourable Dame Roma Mitchell, modelled by Janette Moore, sculpted by John Woffinden and Sally Francis, unveiled 1 July 1999.

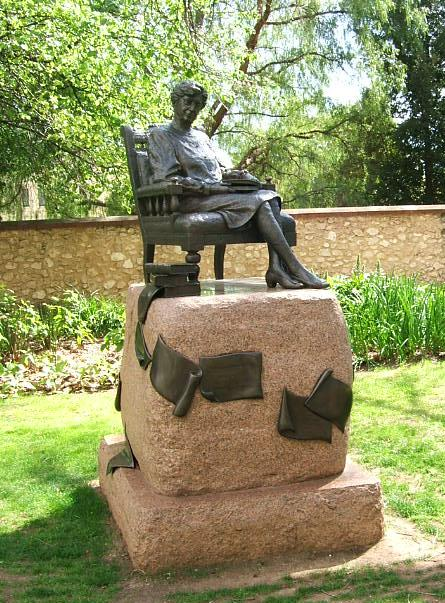

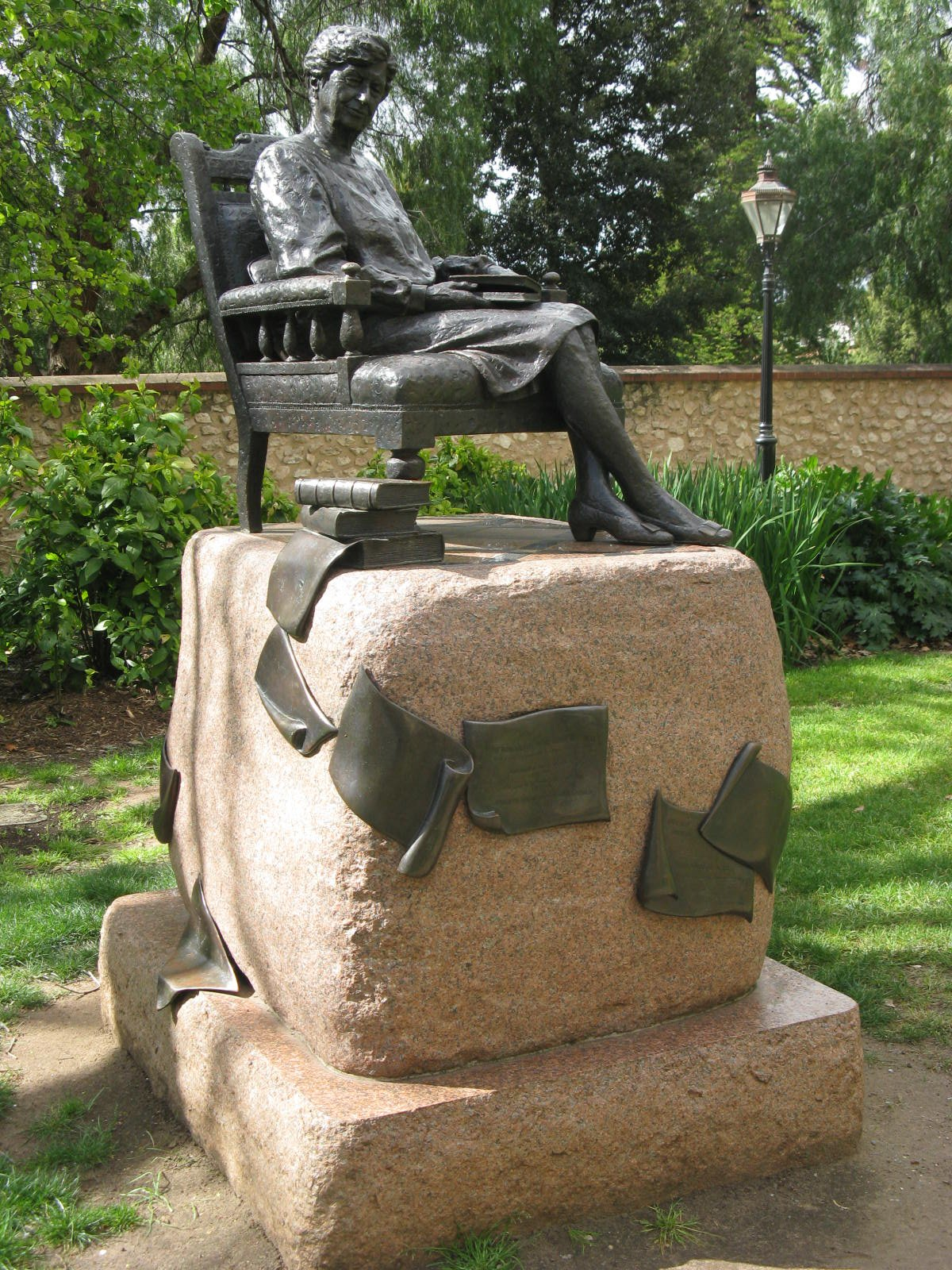

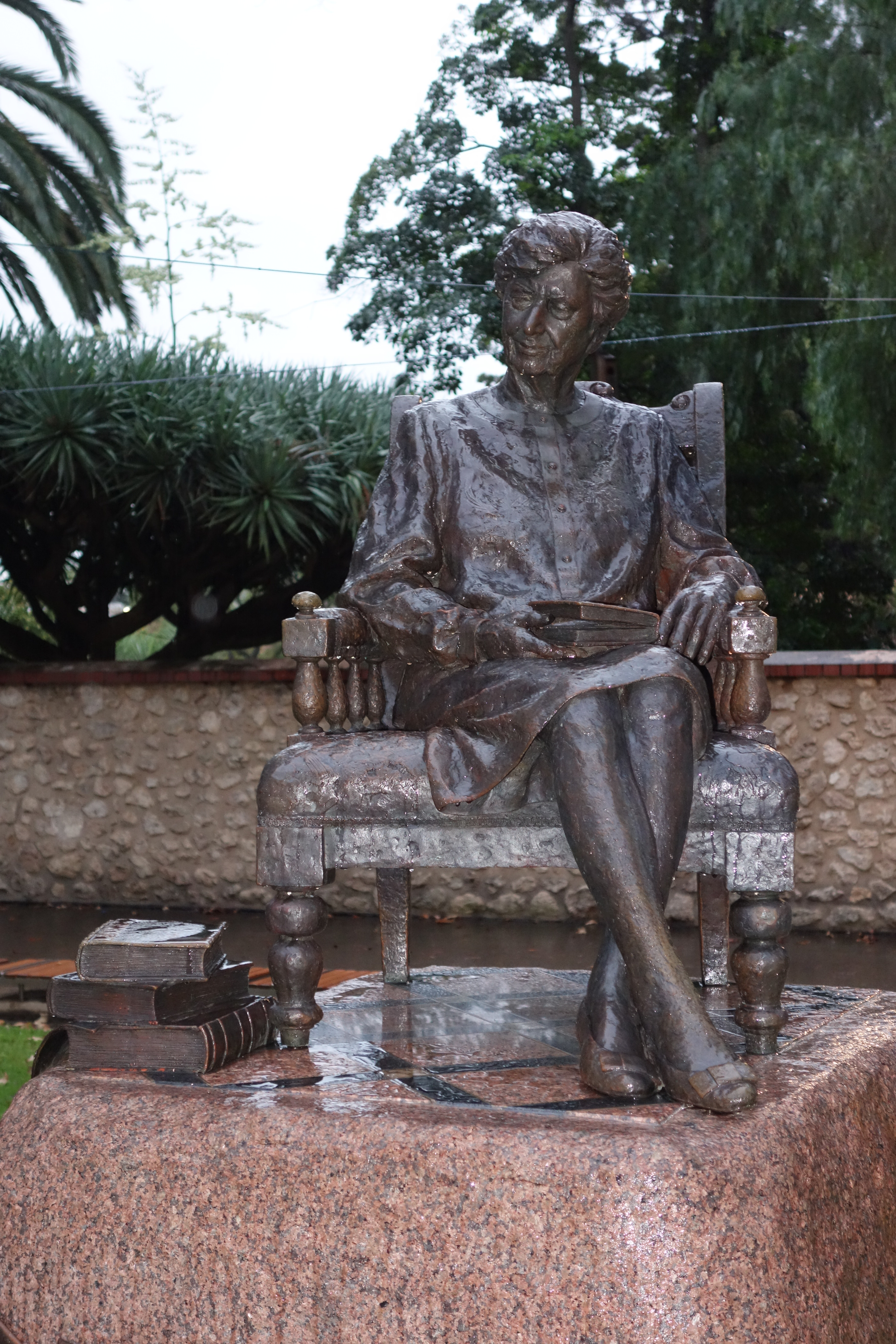

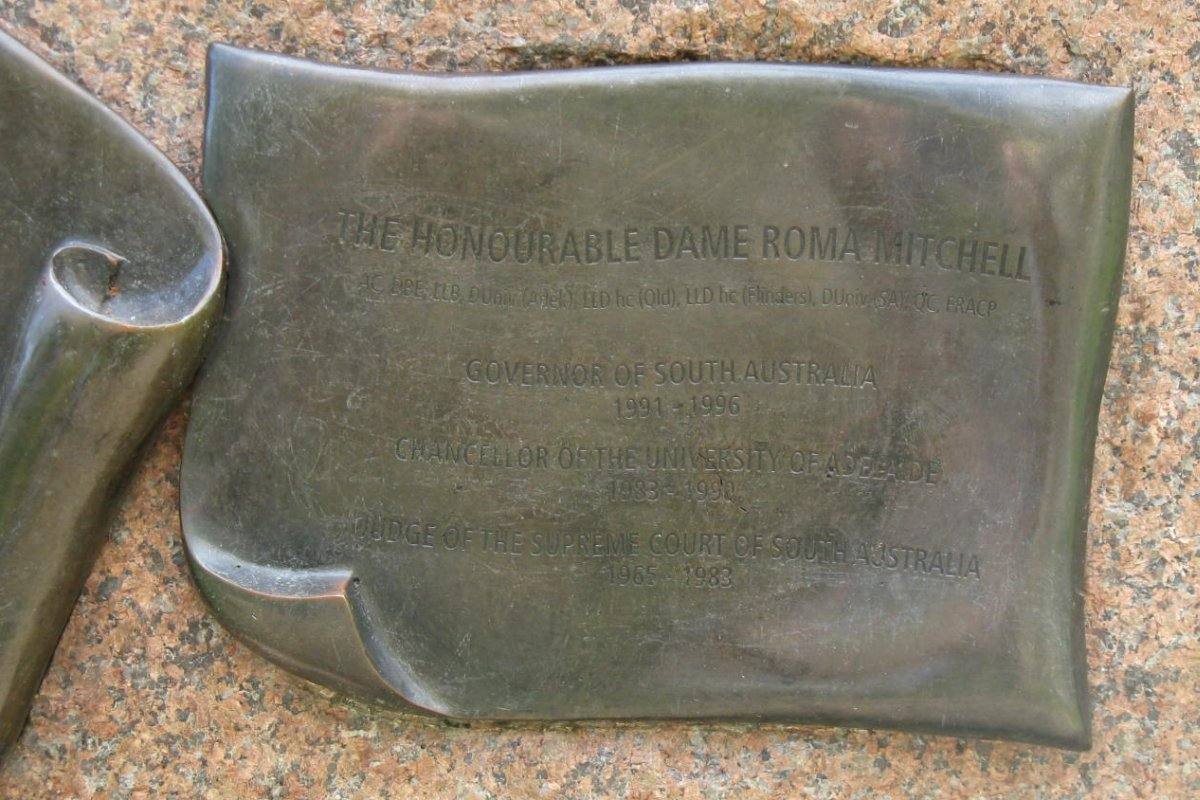

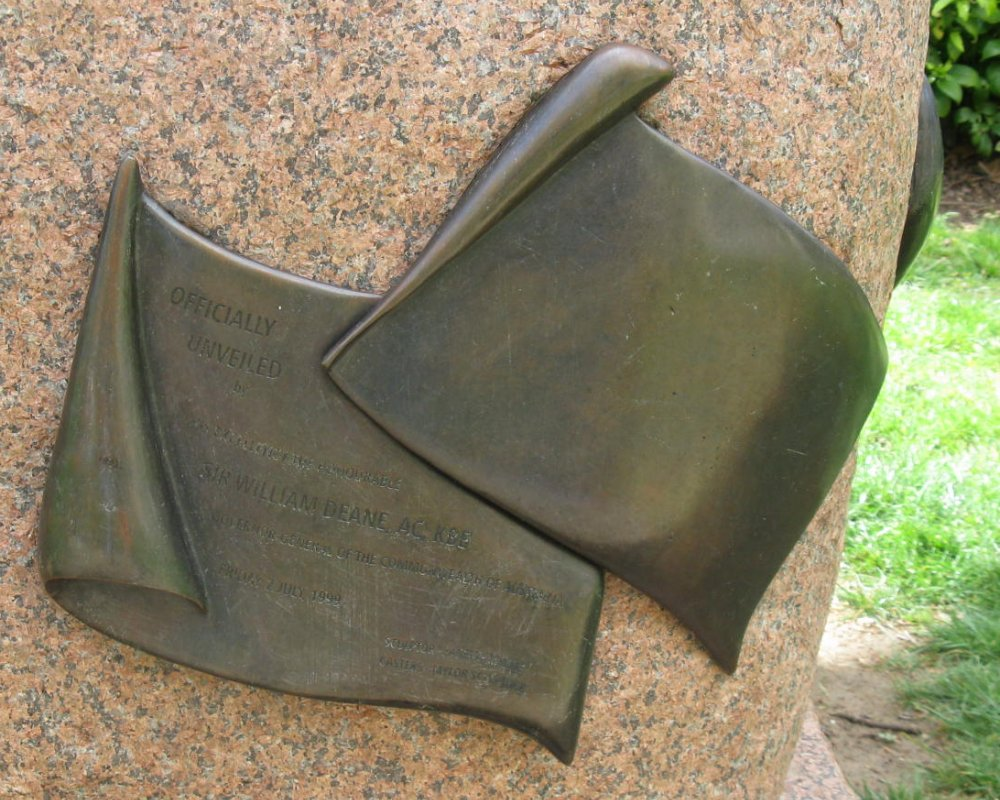

=== Statue: Venere Di Canova ===
Statue of Venus (Venere di Canova) donated by W. A. Horn in 1892. Somewhat controversial at the time of its unveiling in 1892, this piece was the first of Adelaide's street statues. It is a copy in Carrara marble of the statue of Venus by Antonio Canova – the original is at the Pitti Palace in Florence. (Photo of the original.) – Pedestal of Sicilian and Kapunda marble. Executed by Fraser & Draysey. Presented by Mr W. A. Horn. Unveiled 3 September 1892, by His Worship the Mayor (F.W. Bullock, Esq.).

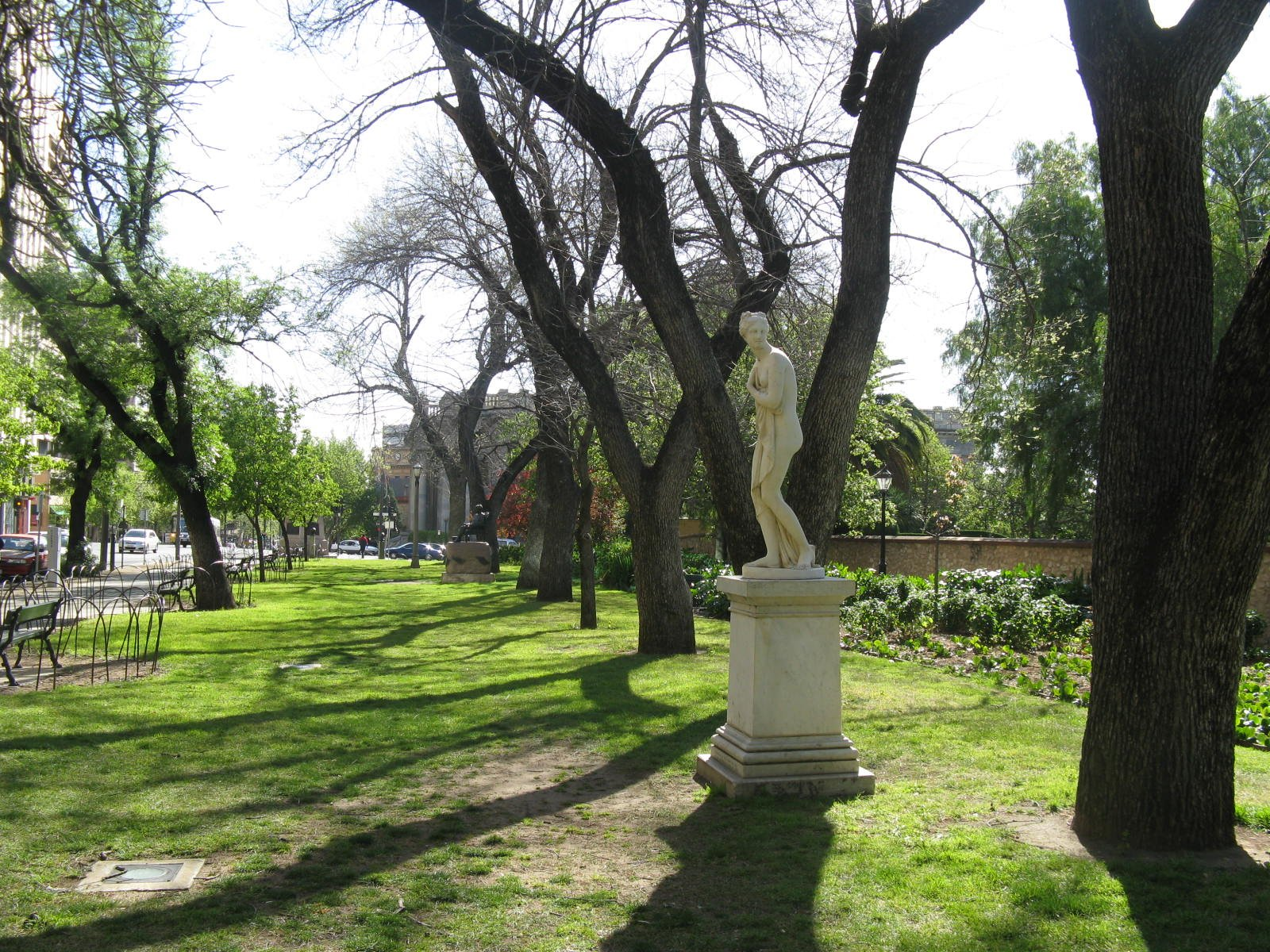
Looking west

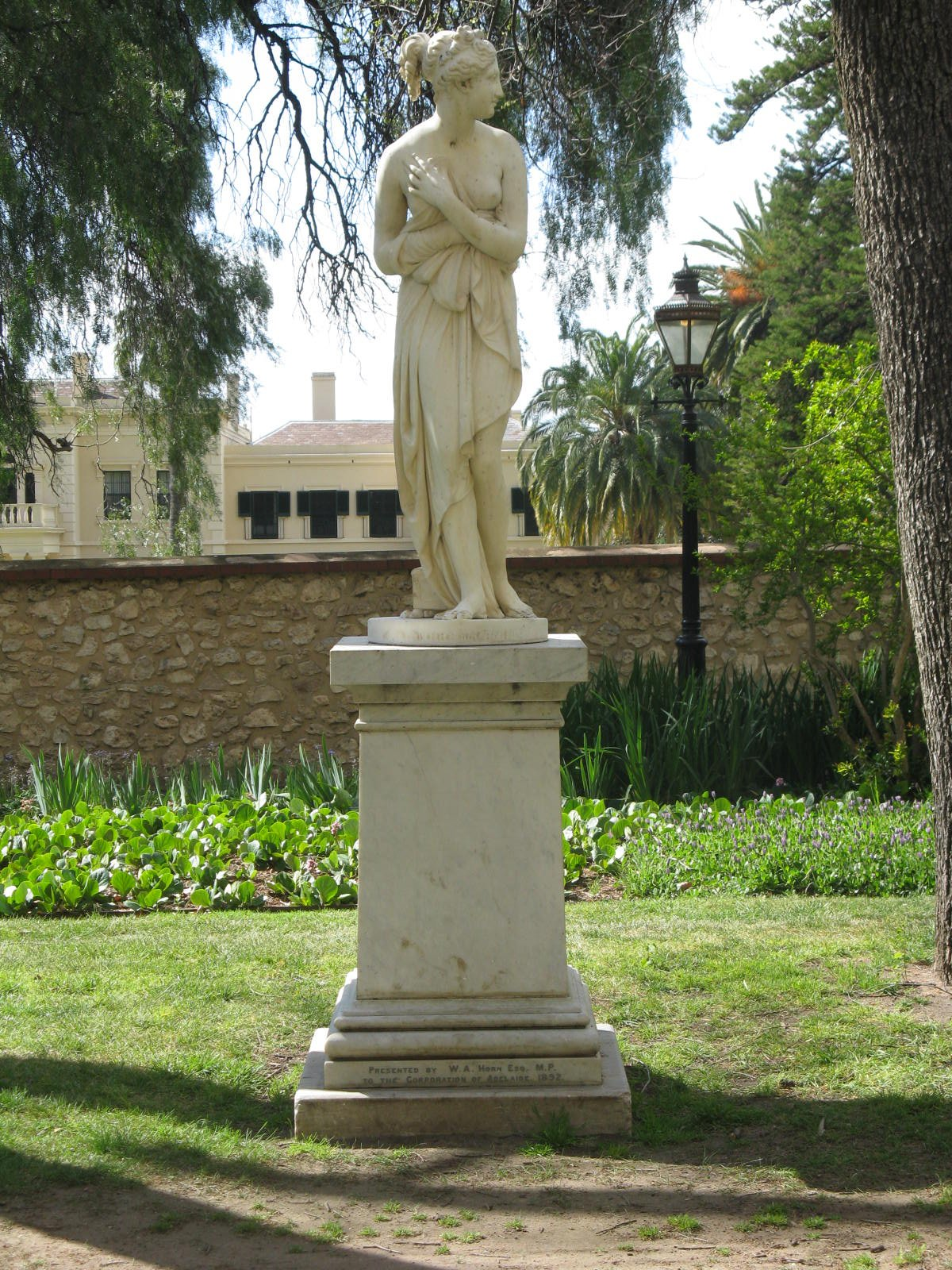
Statue

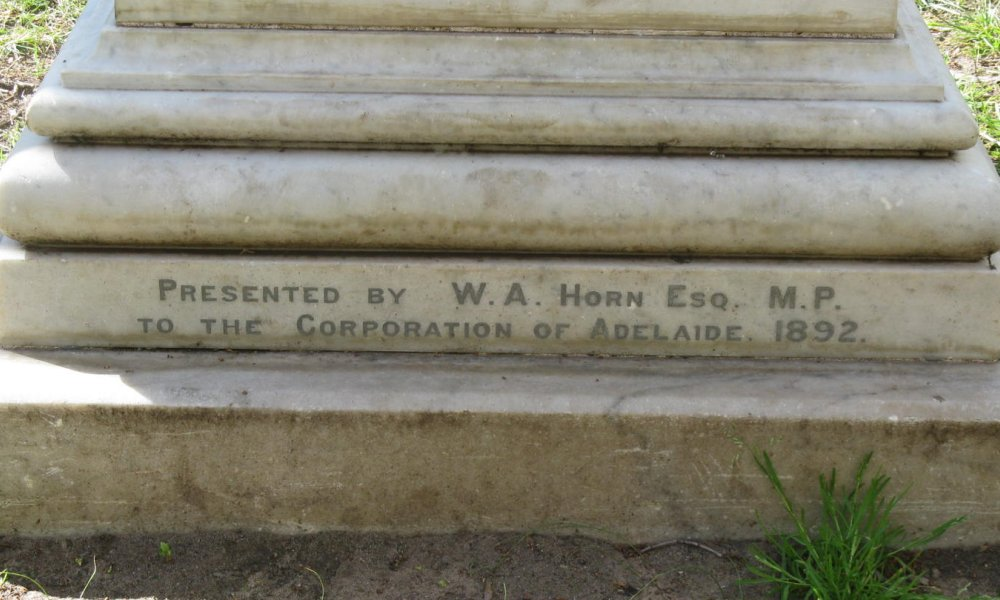
Base

=== Busts ===
Prior to 2011, the bust of Lord Florey stood alone in this portion of the Prince Henry Gardens. The bust was completed by John Dowie in 1969, and unveiled by the Right Honourable the Lord Mayor (Robert E. Porter, Esq.) on 25 June 1969.

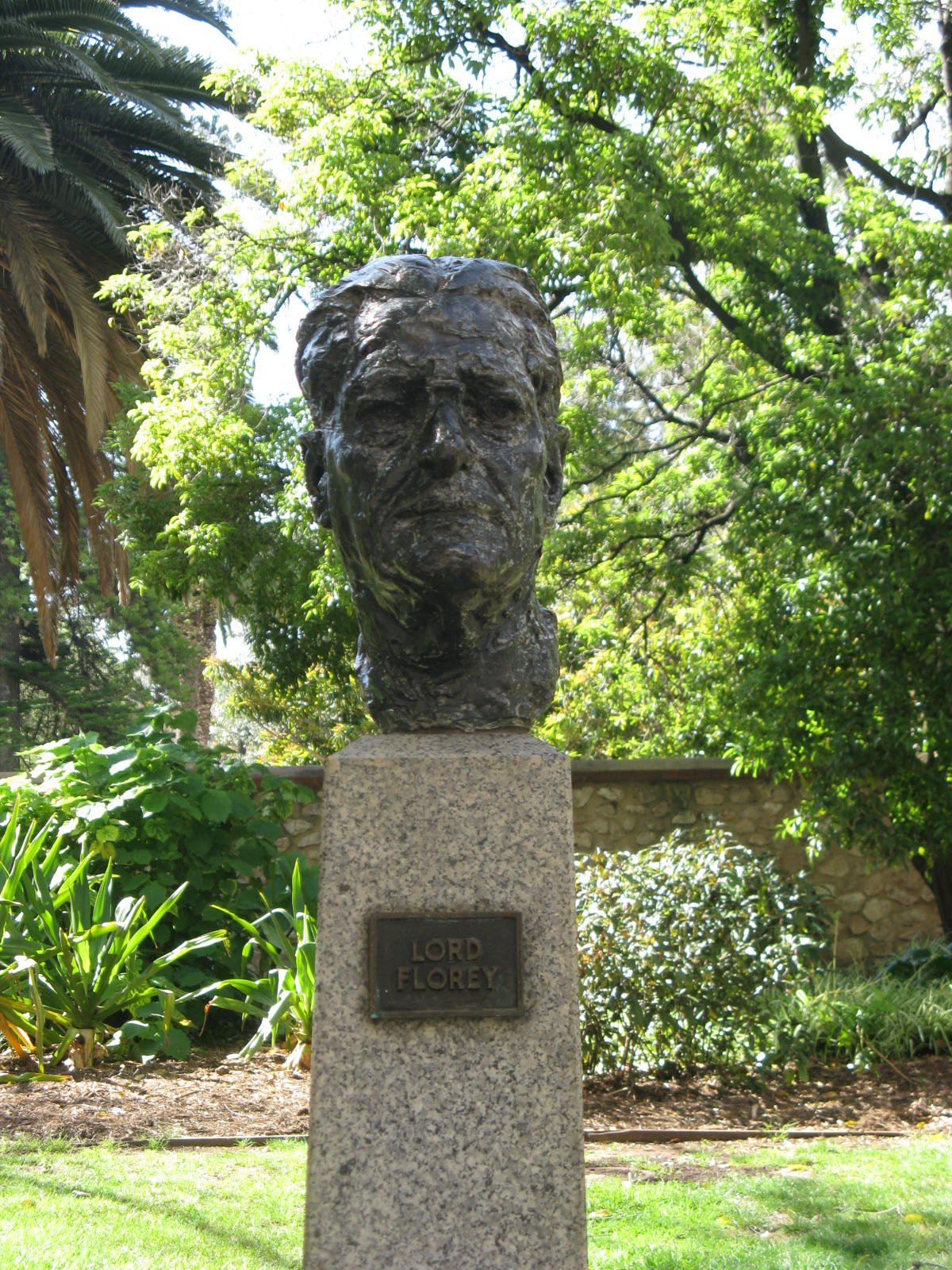

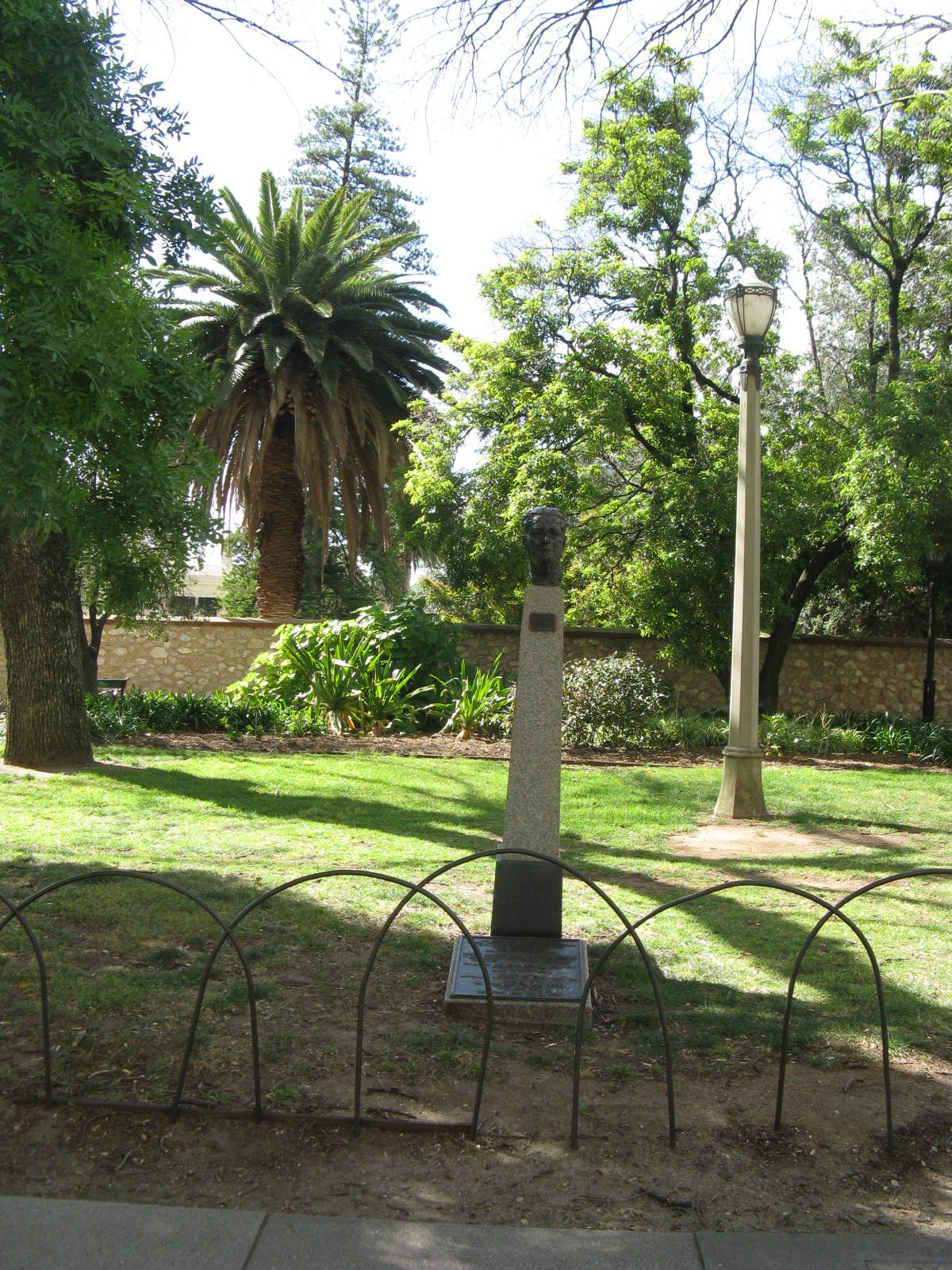

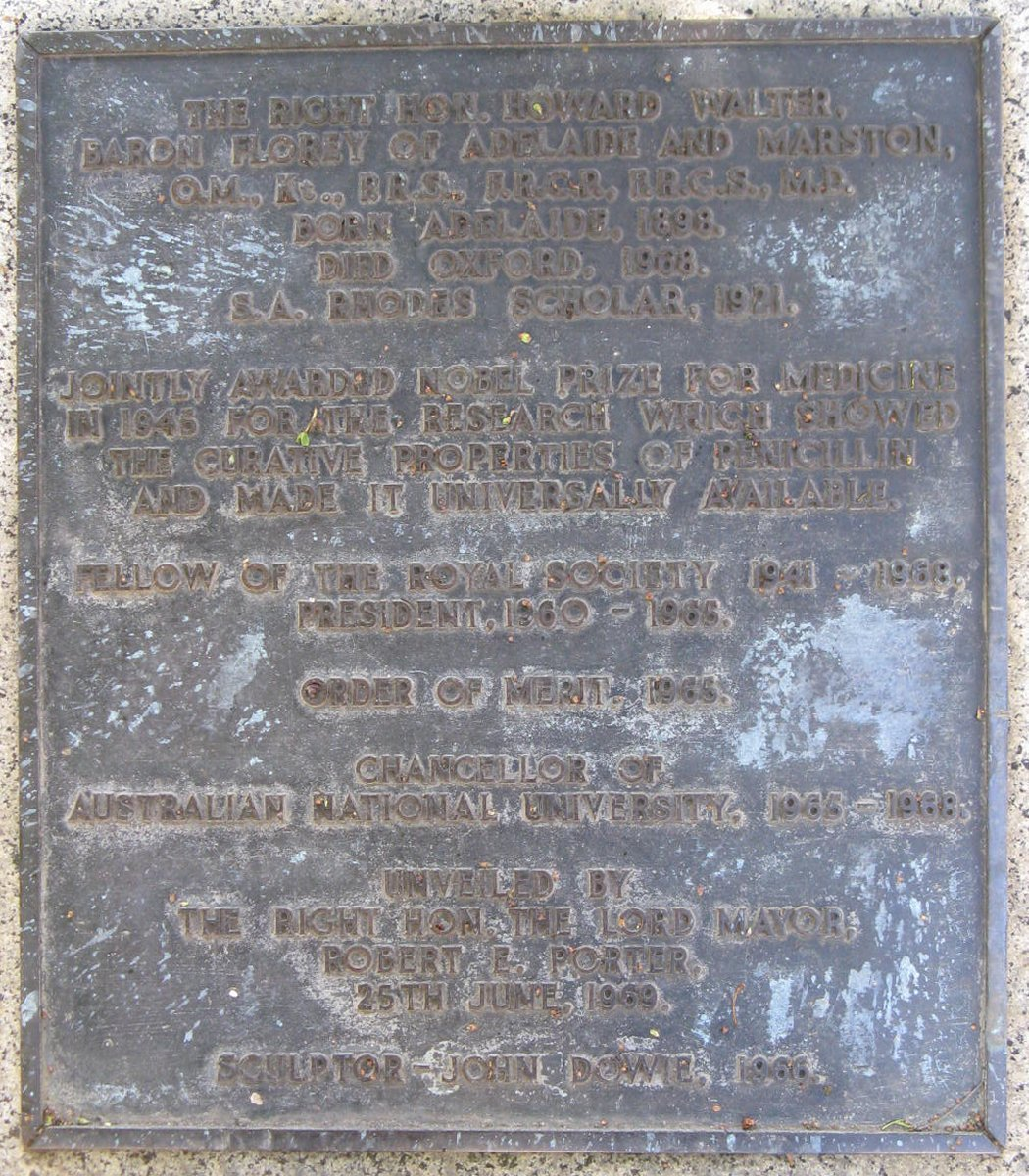

After the 2011 reorganisation of the area, the bust of Florey was joined by the busts of Oliphant, Lee and Napier relocated from King William Street, and new busts (of Sir Lawrence Bragg and later Sir William Henry Bragg) were added to the group.

The three busts in their pre-2011 locations:

Sir Thomas John Mellis Napier by John Dowie, 1970.
Unveiled by His Excellency the Governor-General of Australia, The Right Honourable Sir Paul Hasluck, C.M.G., G.C.V.O., K.St.J, 2 July 1970.

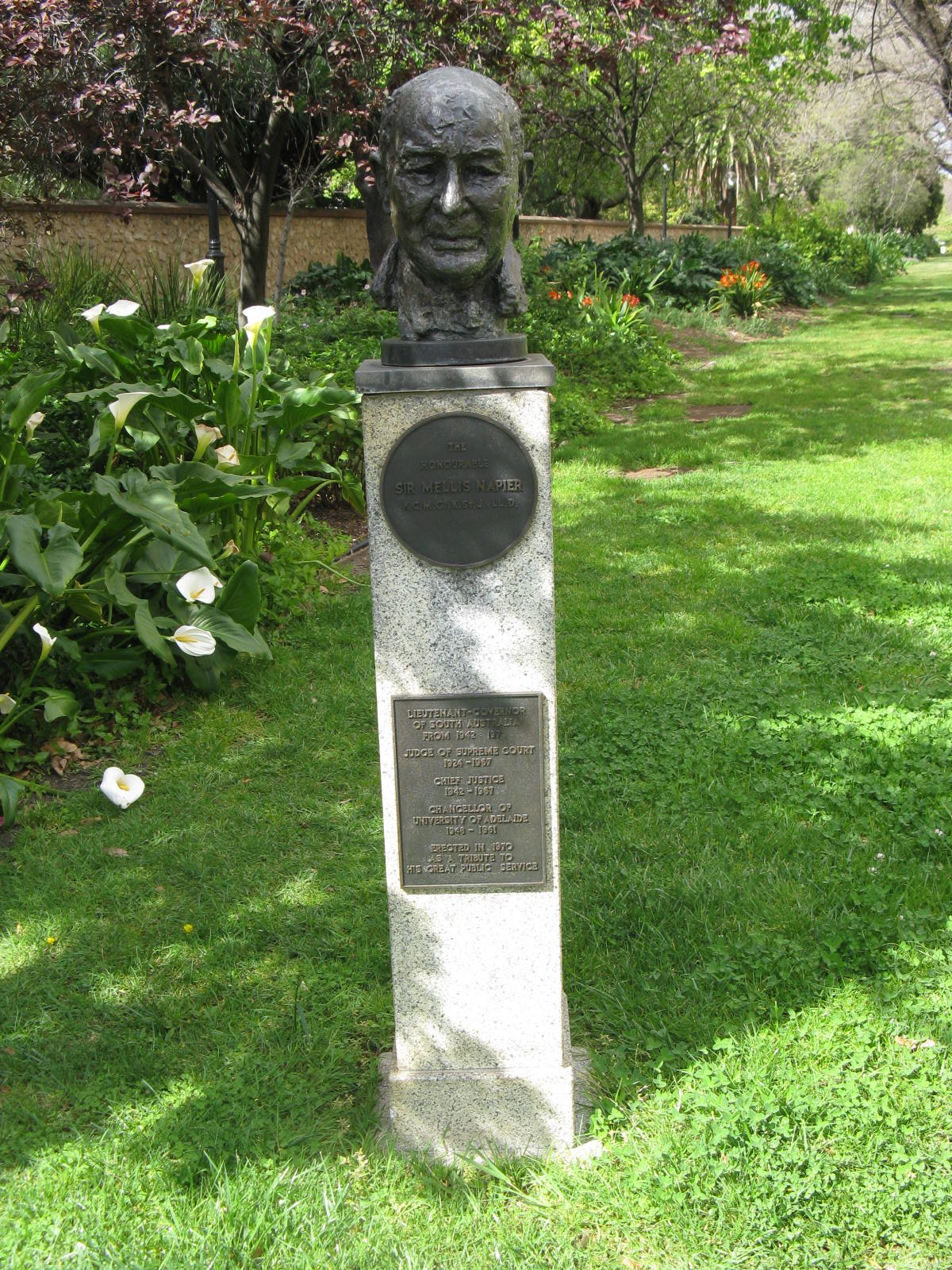

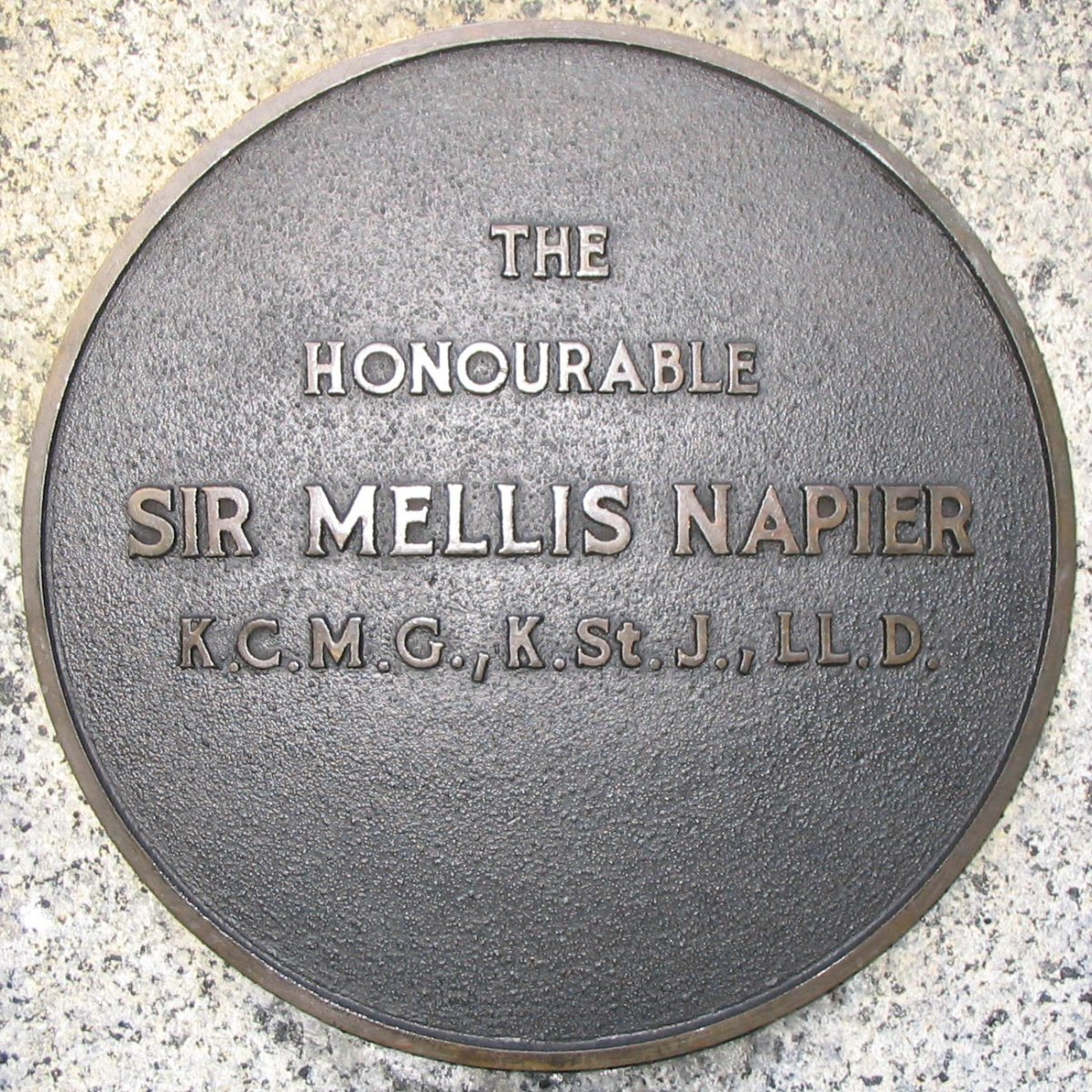

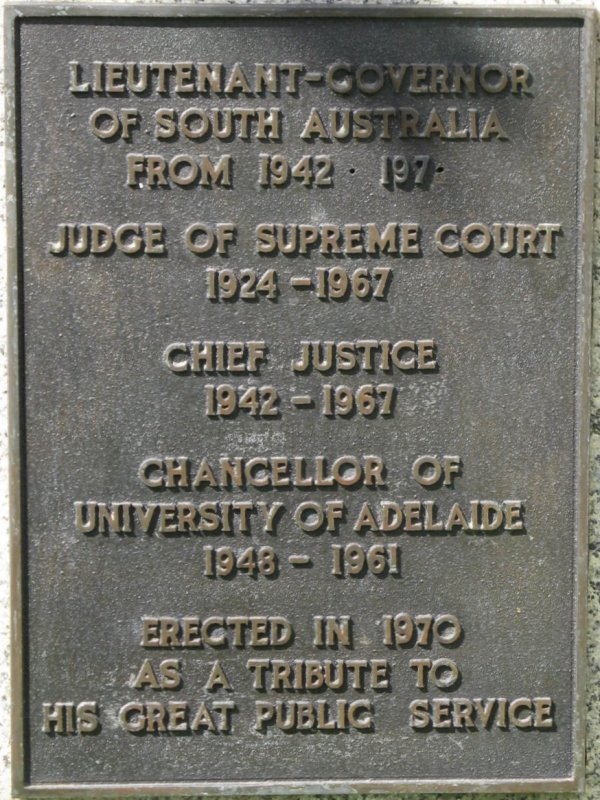

Mary Lee by Pat Moseley.

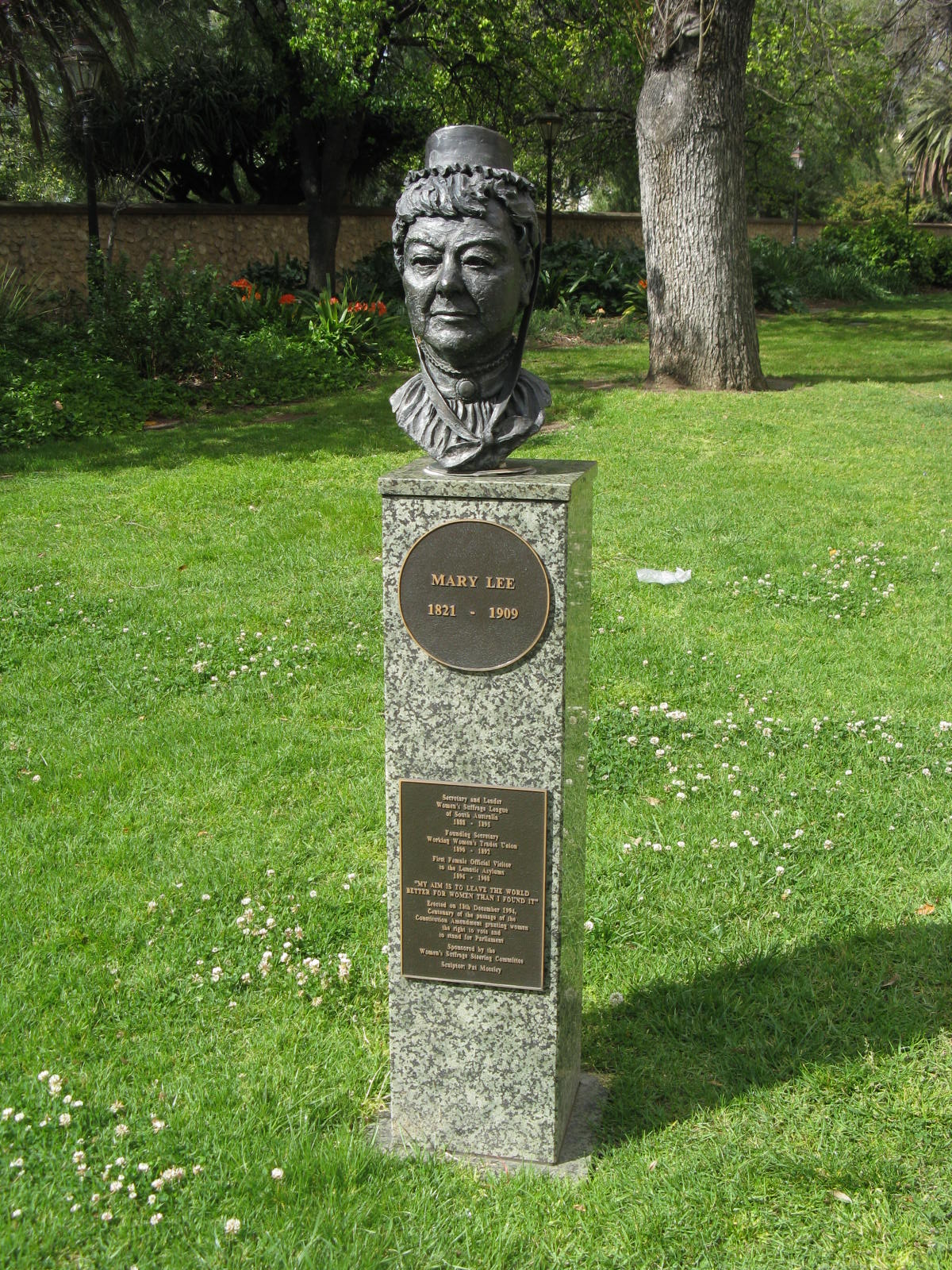

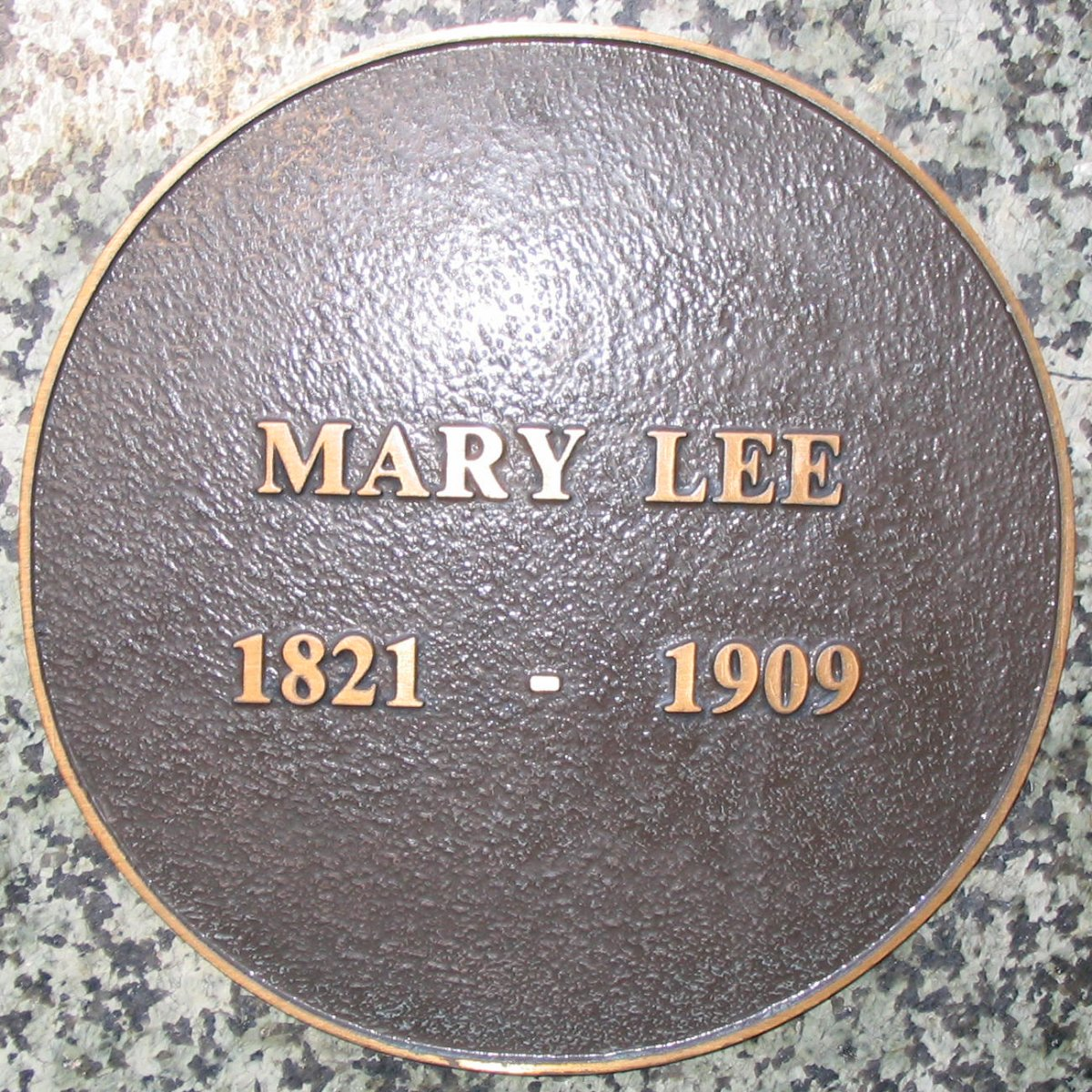

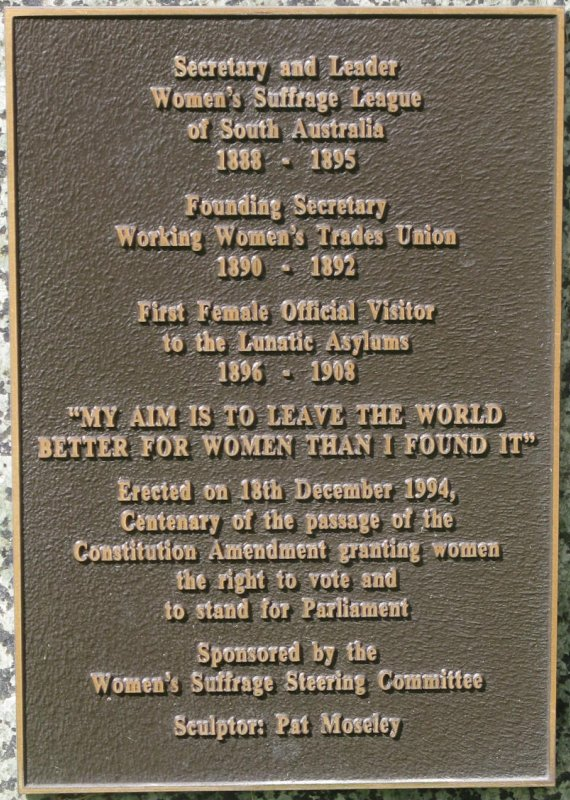

Sir Mark Oliphant by John Dowie, 1978.

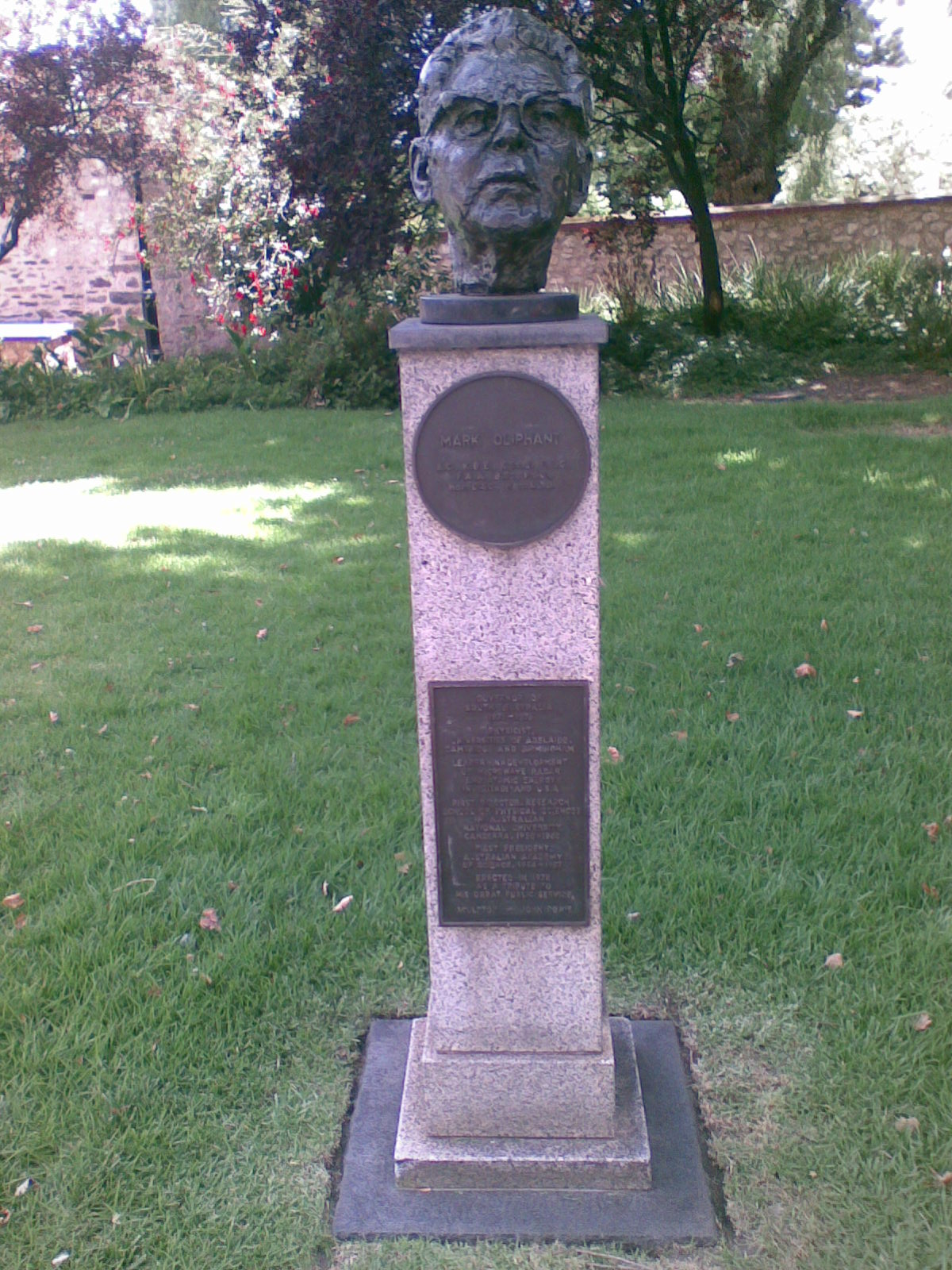

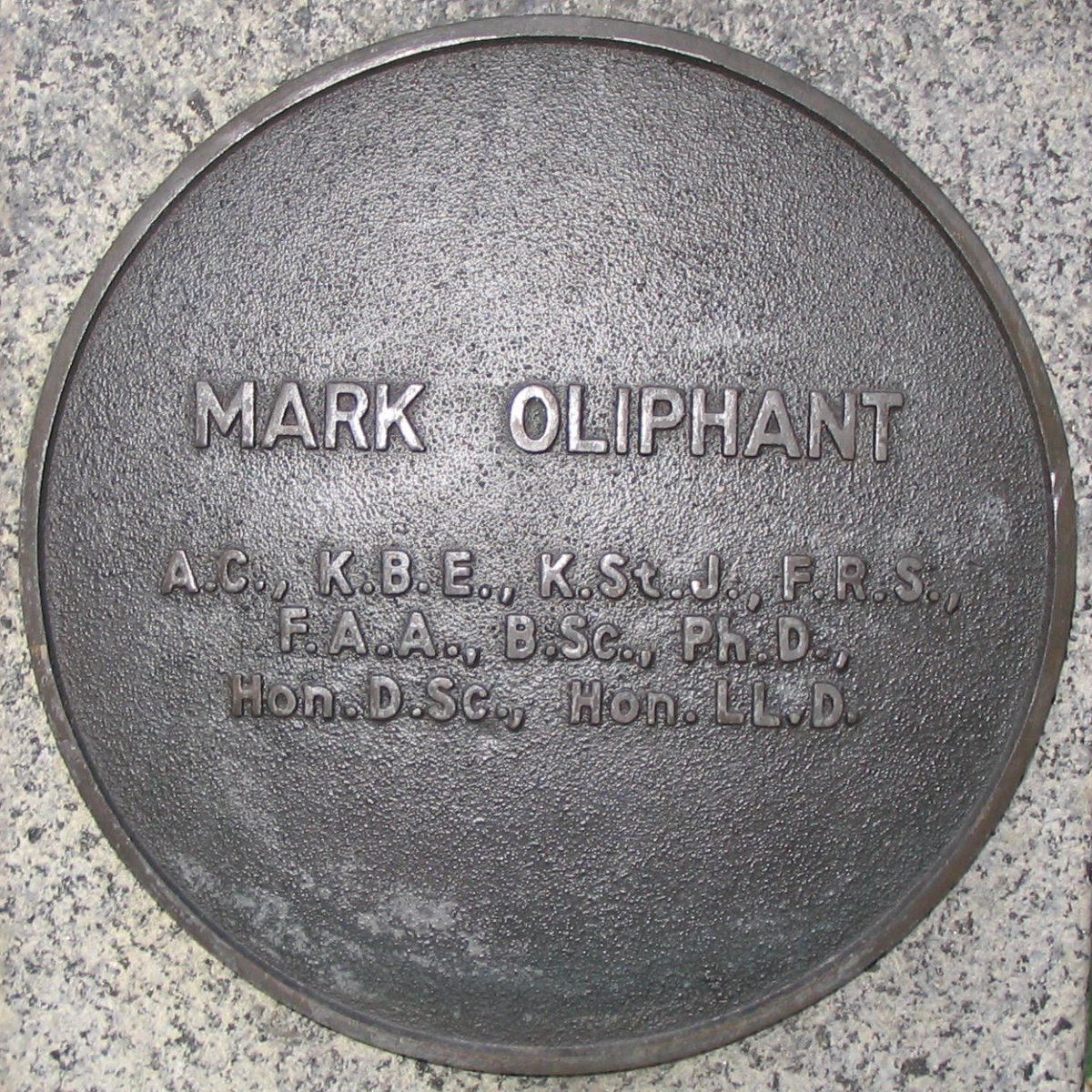

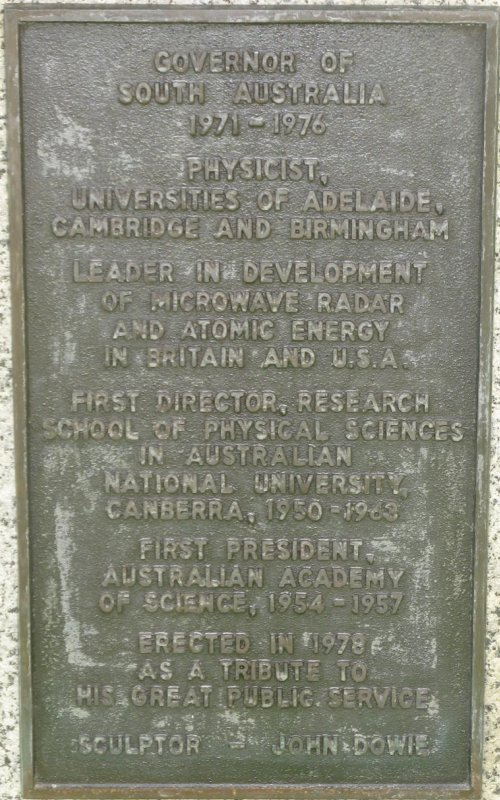

Five busts in 2013. Six busts in 2017

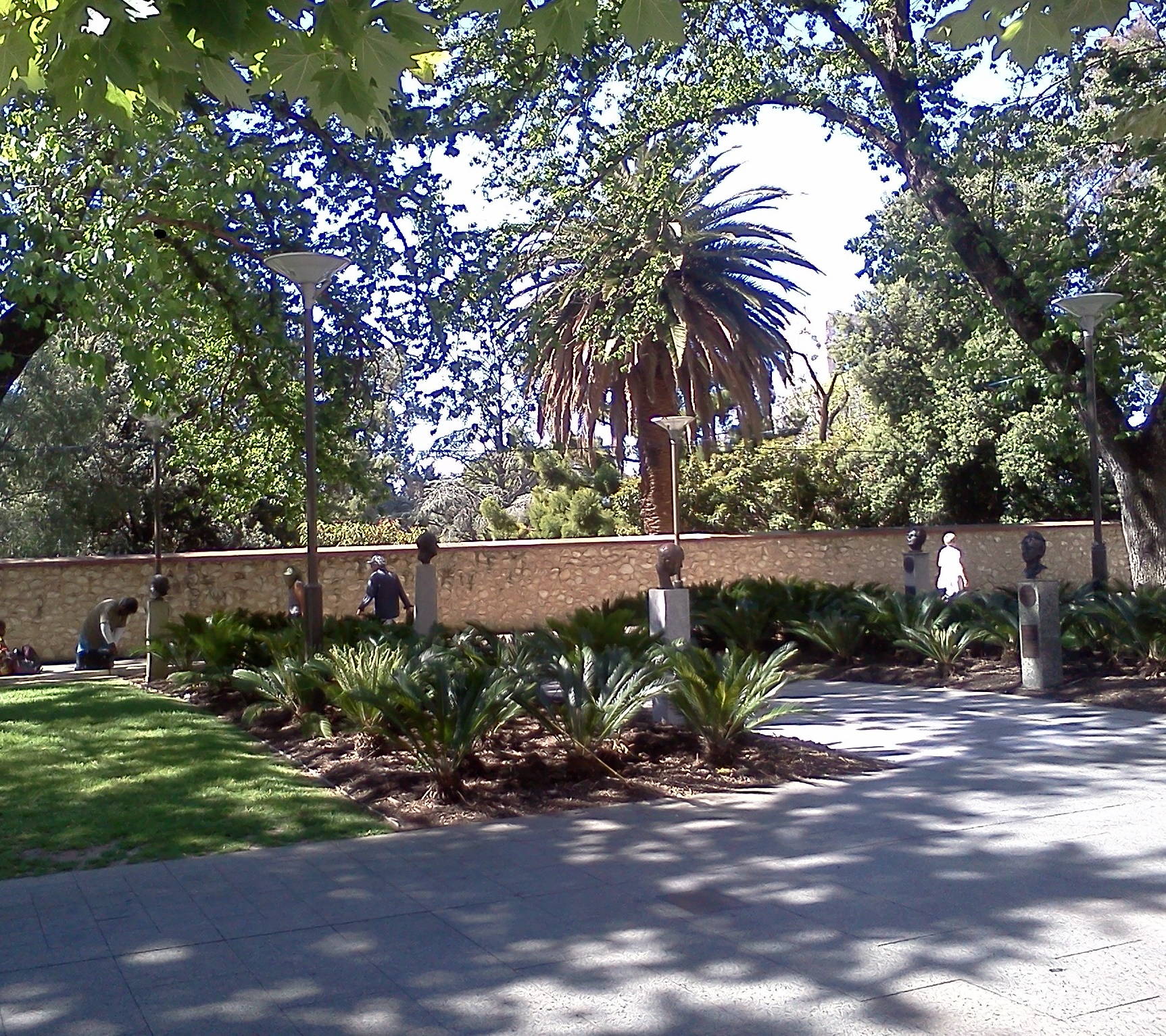
2013 L to R: Napier, Florey, L. Bragg, Oliphant and Lee

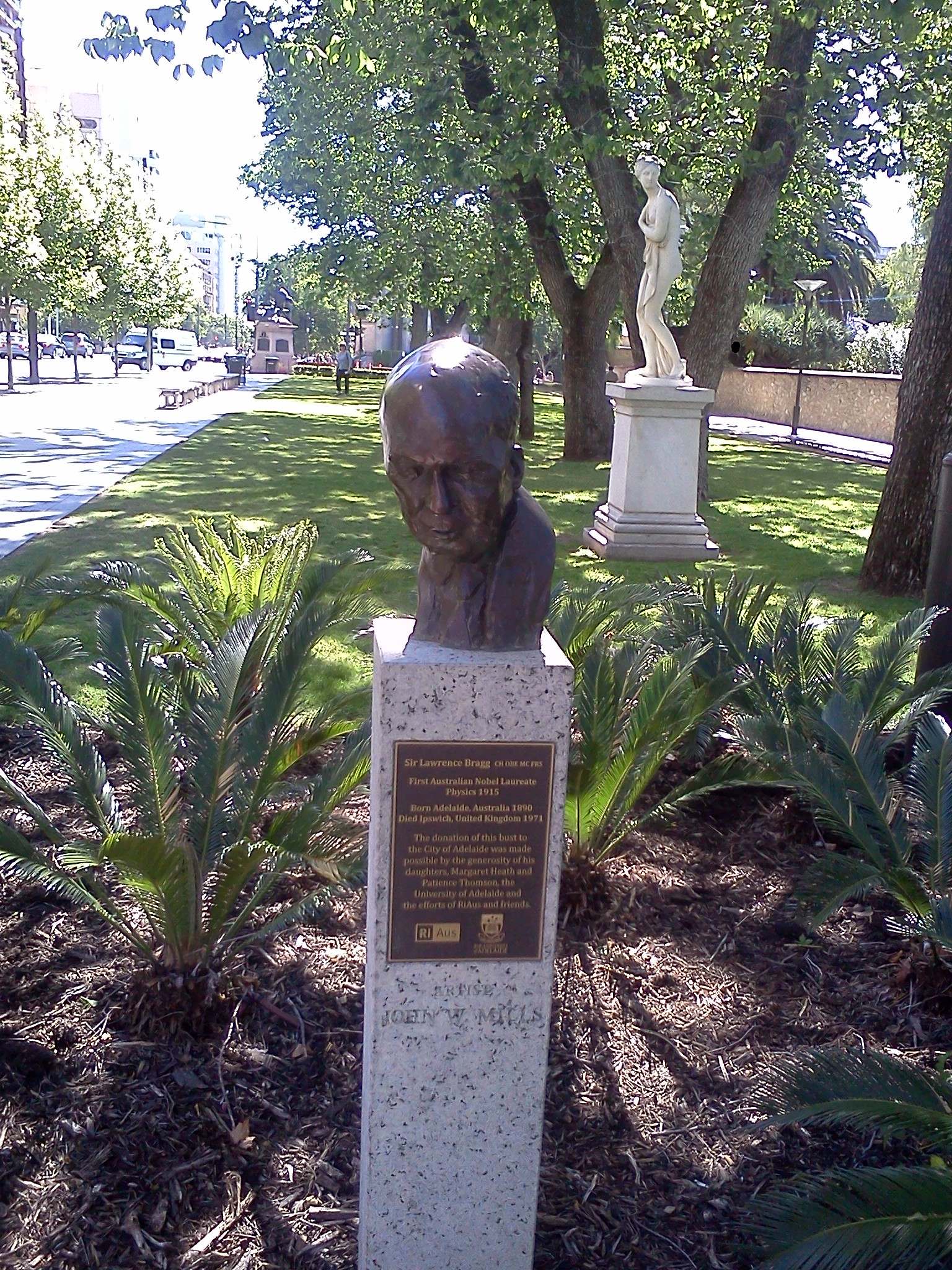
Sir Lawrence Bragg by John W. Mills

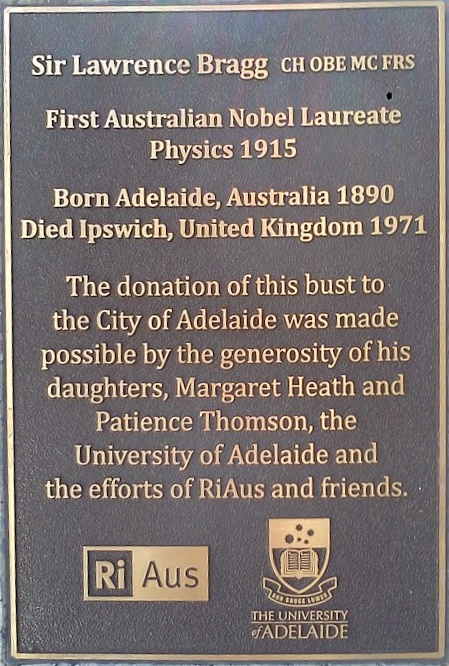

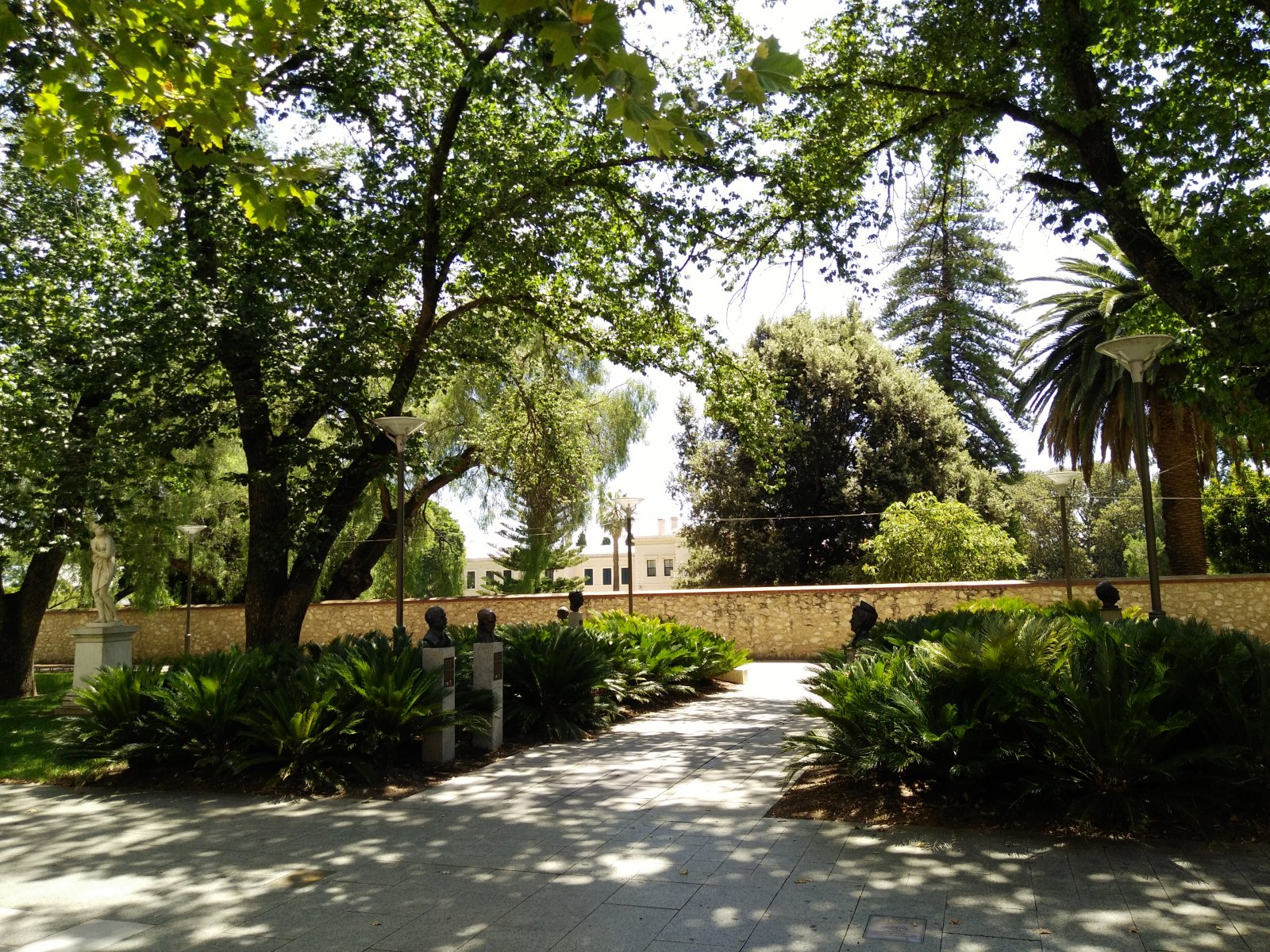
2017 Venus and L to R: W. H. Bragg, L. Bragg, Napier, Florey, Lee and Oliphant

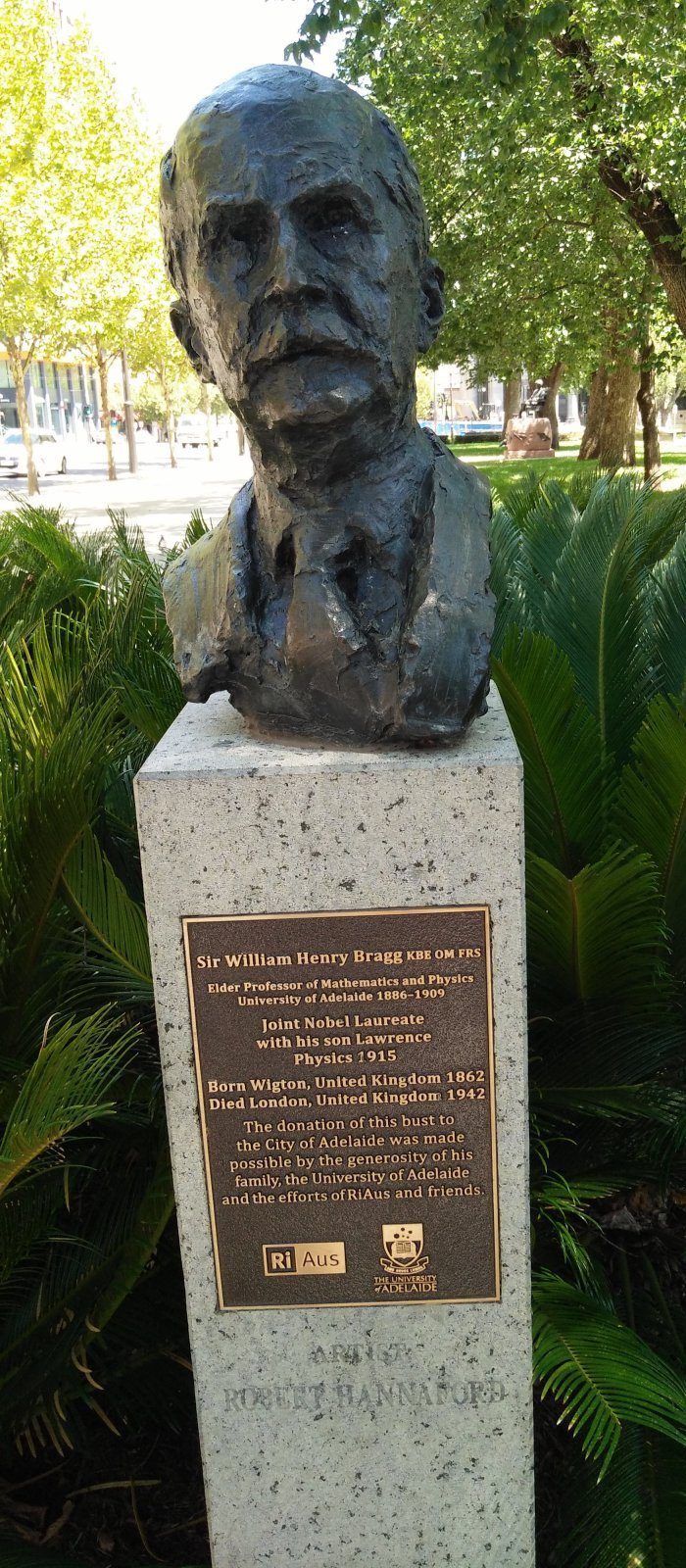
Sir William Henry Bragg by Robert Hannaford

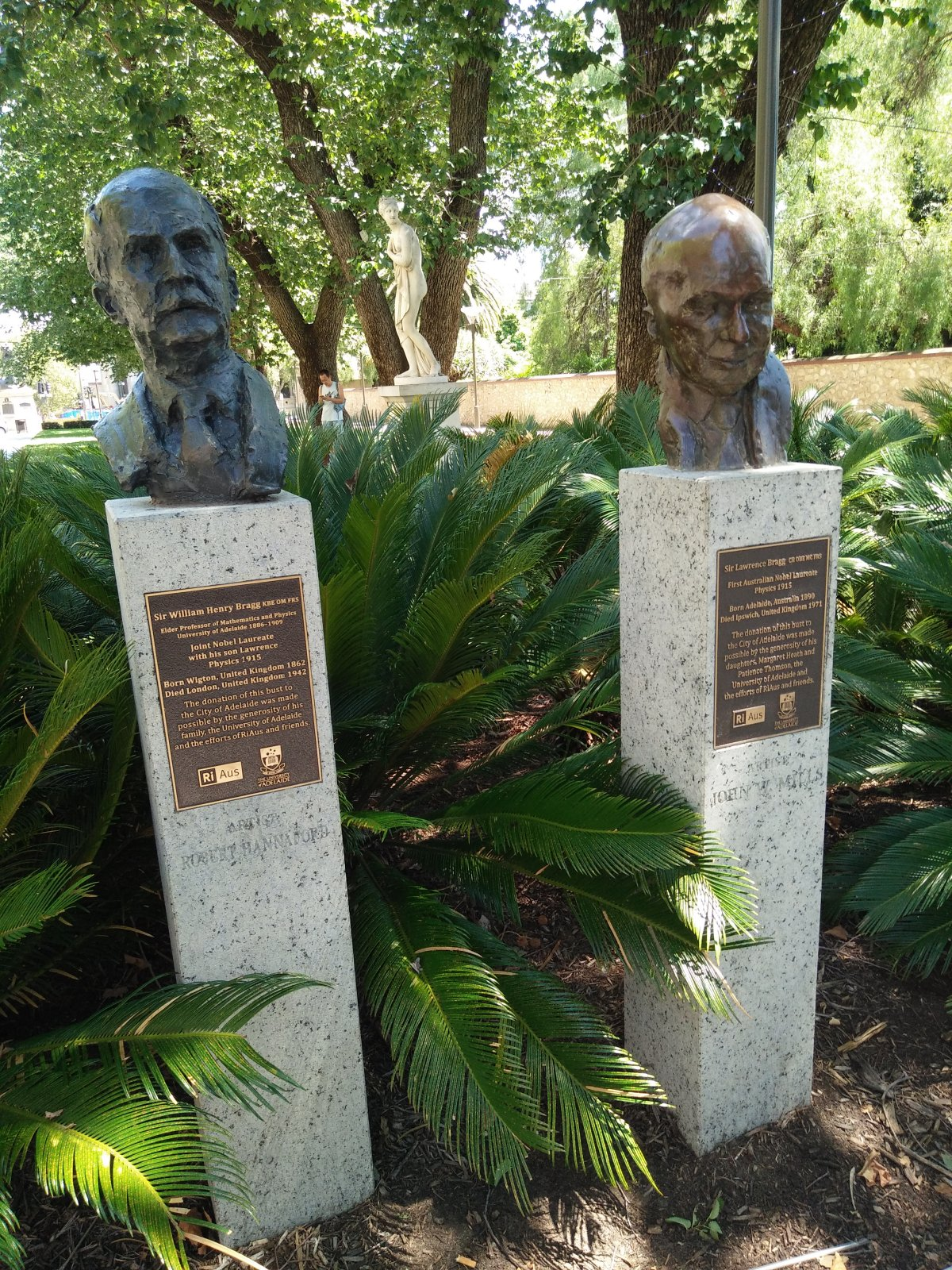
Father and son

=== Statue of Matthew Flinders ===
Captain Matthew Flinders by F. Brook Hitch, A.R.B.S. Pedestal of Murray Bridge red granite from Kirchel's quarry at Swanport. Paving of Tea Tree Gully freestone. Architect, A.E. Simpson, I.S.O., F.R.A.I.A. (Architect-in-Chief of subscription.) Unveiled 12 April 1934.

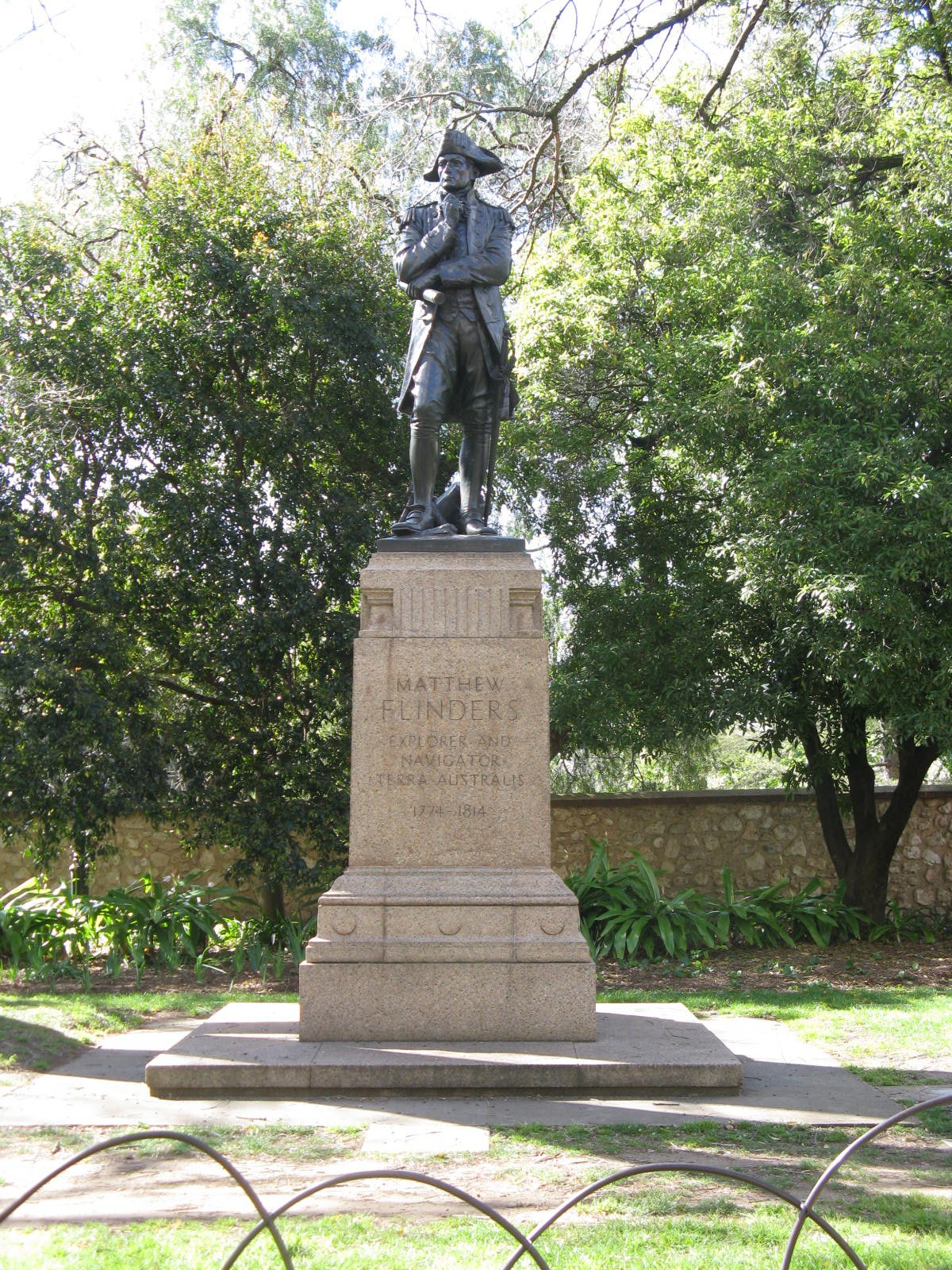

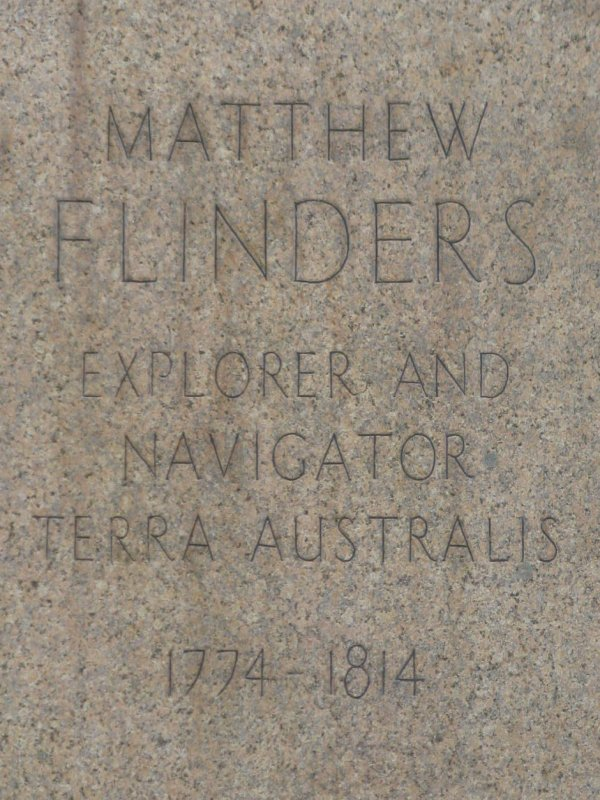

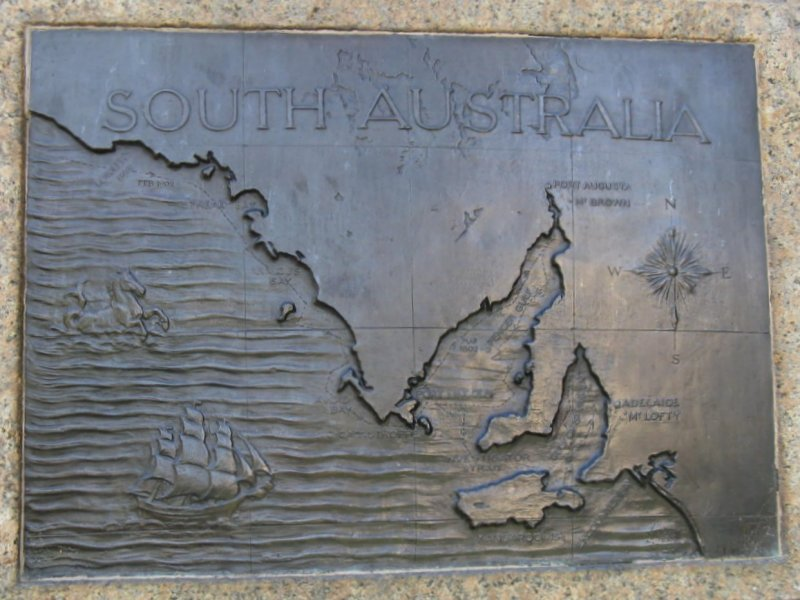

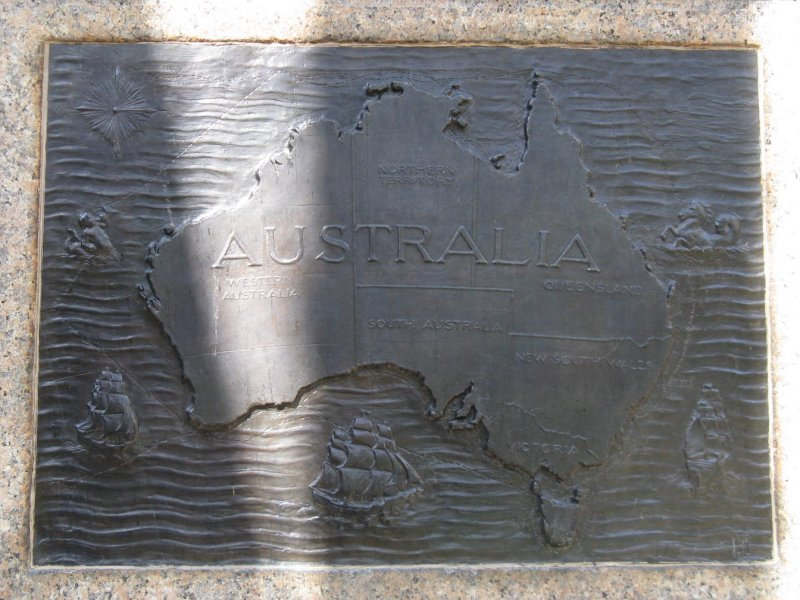

=== National War Memorial ===
National War Memorial – Great War – 1914–1918 by Woods, Bagot, Jory & Laybourne Smith; and Rayner Hoff, 1931.

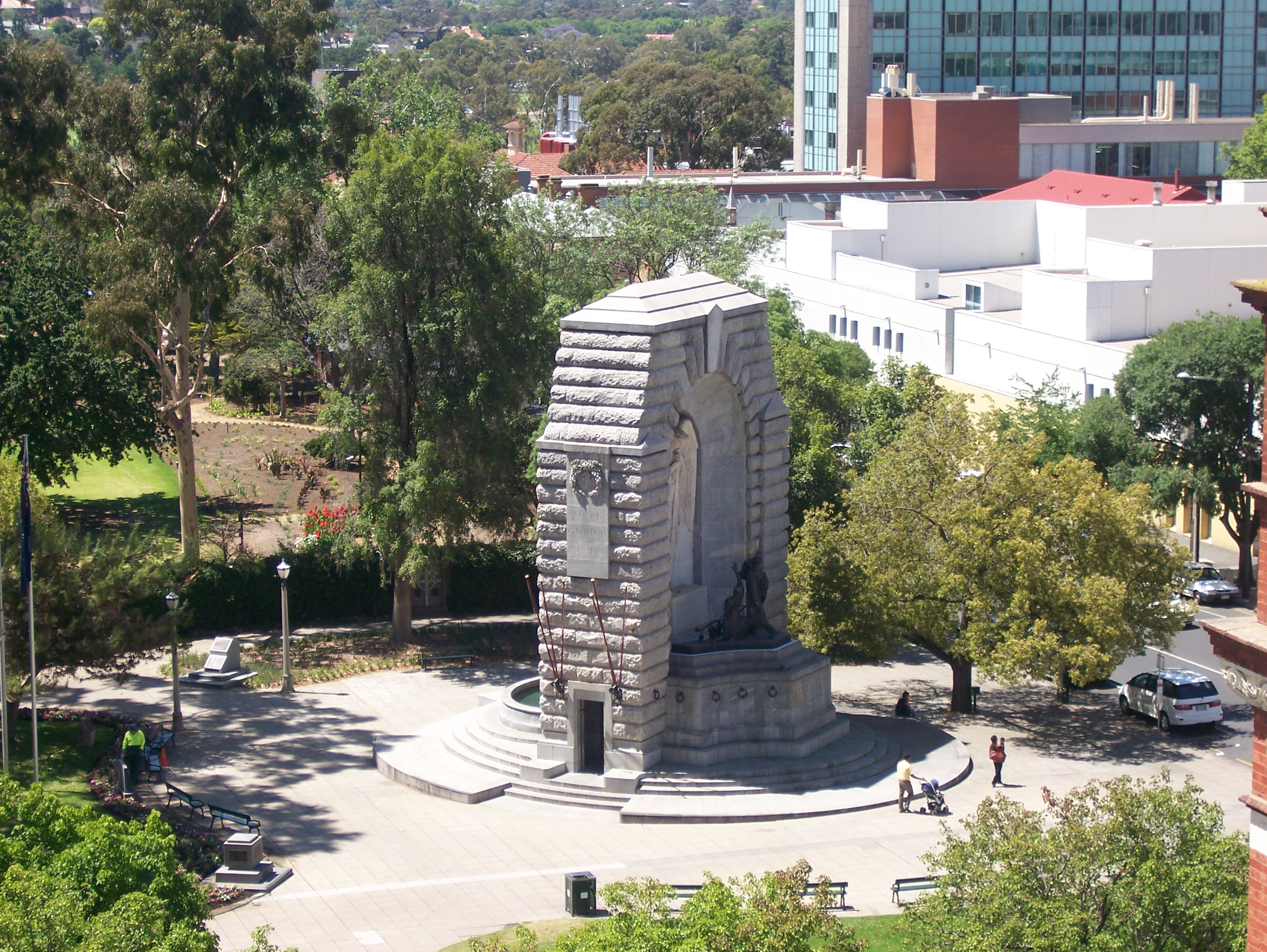

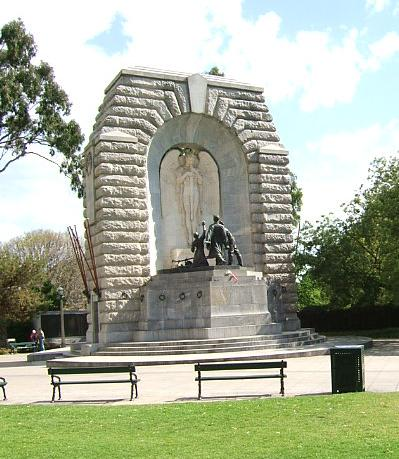

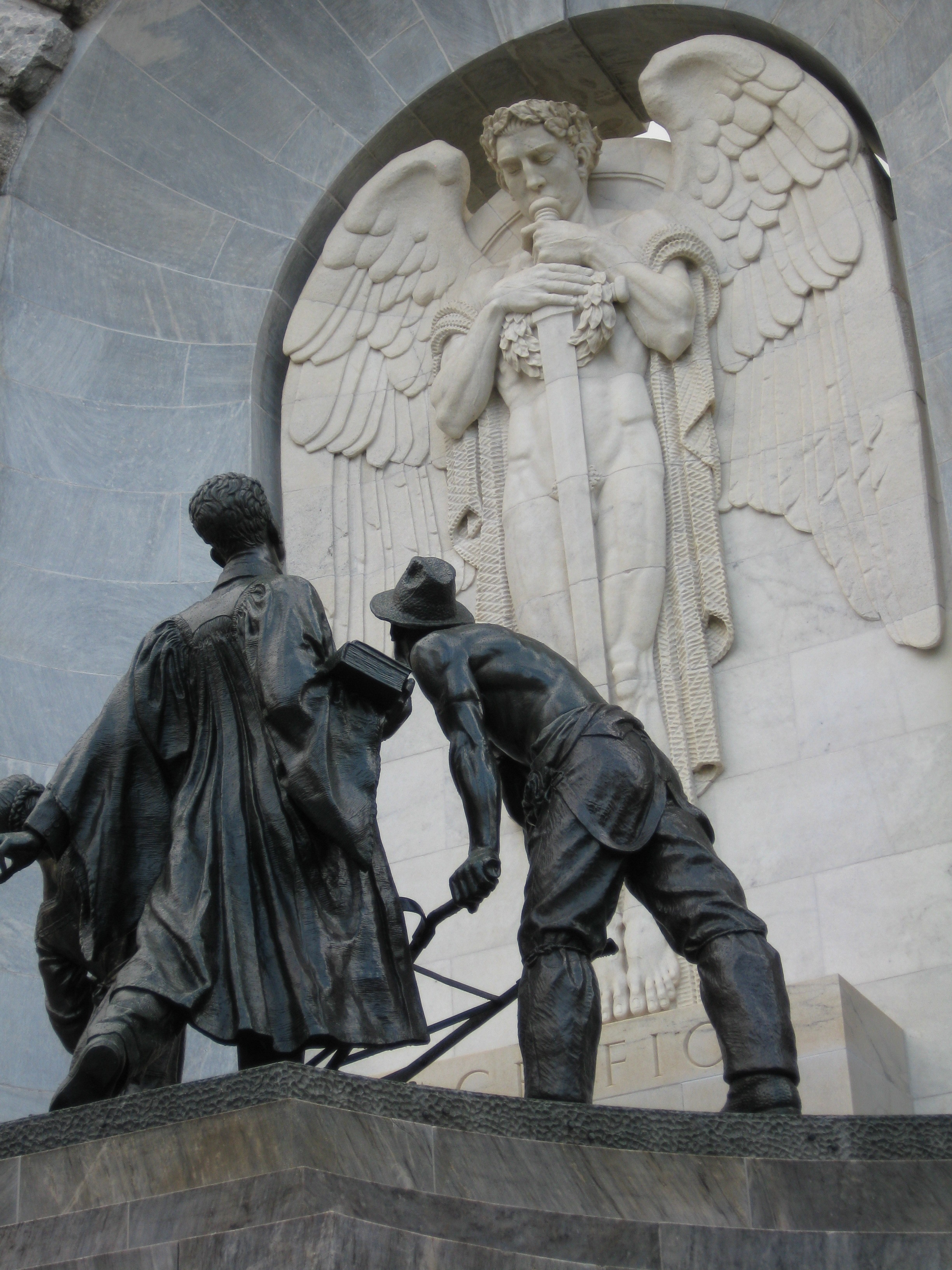
Spirit of Duty

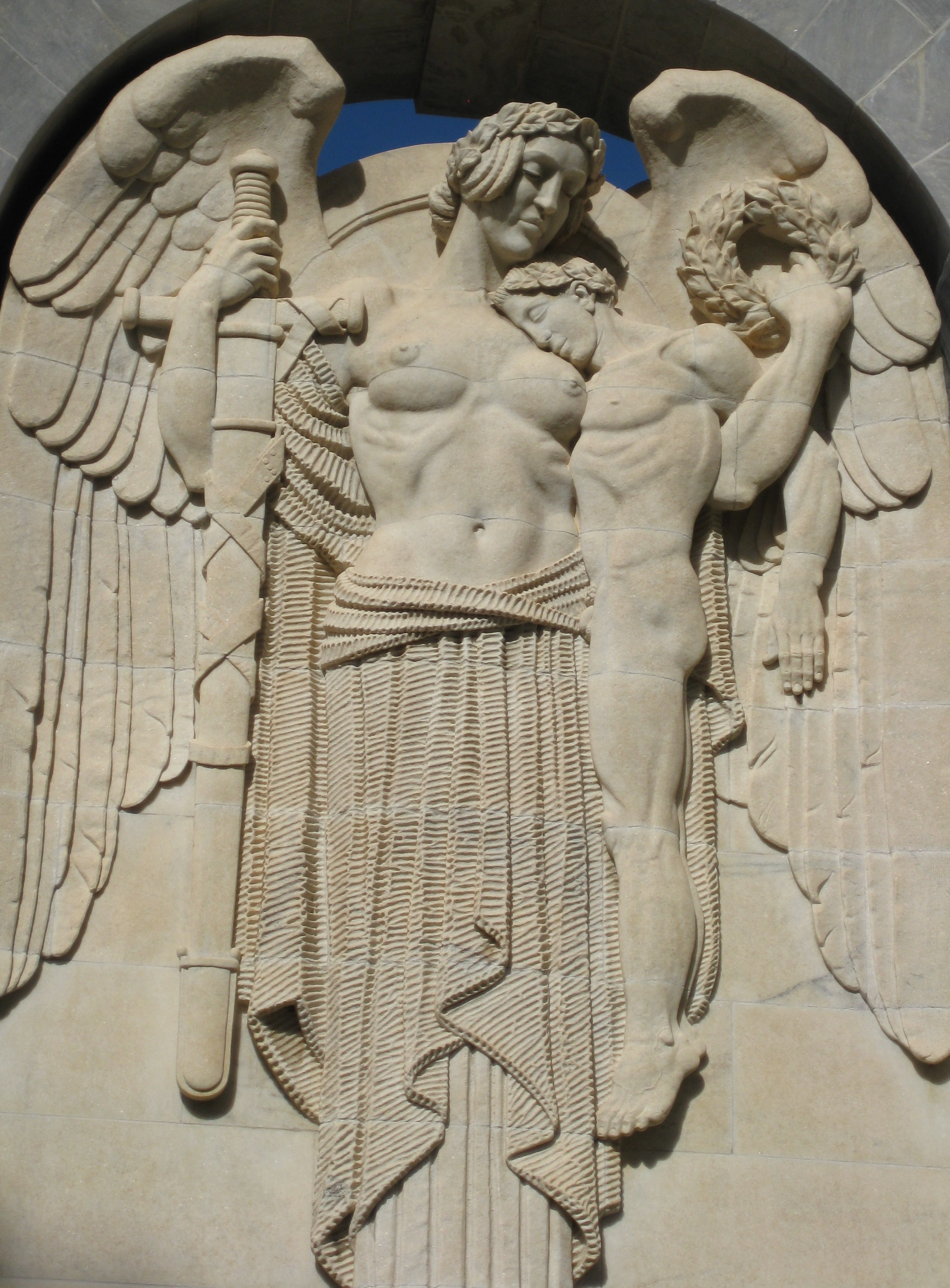
Spirit of Compassion

Although the National War Memorial was initially proposed as a memorial to those who served in "The Great War", the site has since grown to incorporate a number of smaller memorials. These include a memorial to the Battle of Lone Pine; the "French Memorial", which commemorates those who fought and died in France during the first and second World Wars; an honour roll of those who died in World War II; and the "Australian Armed Forces Memorial", encompassing the Malayan Emergency of 1948–1960, the Korean War, the Indonesia–Malaysia confrontation in Borneo, and the Vietnam War. In addition, the wall which surrounds the northern and western sides of the site features the six "Crosses of Memory" – a series of "simple wooden crosses" commemorating the Siege of Tobruk from 1941 and the 10th, 27th, 48th and 50th battalions of 1916.

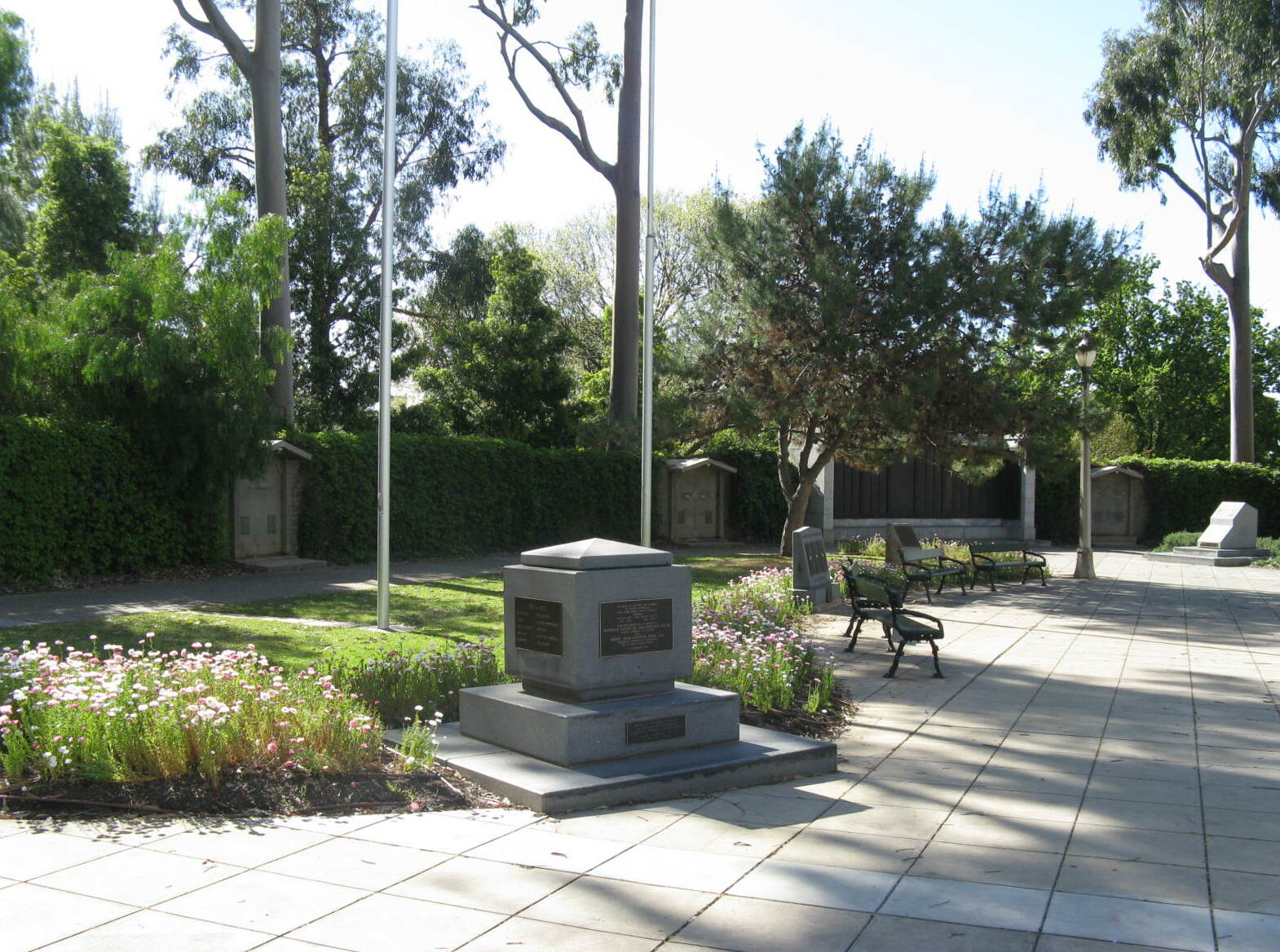

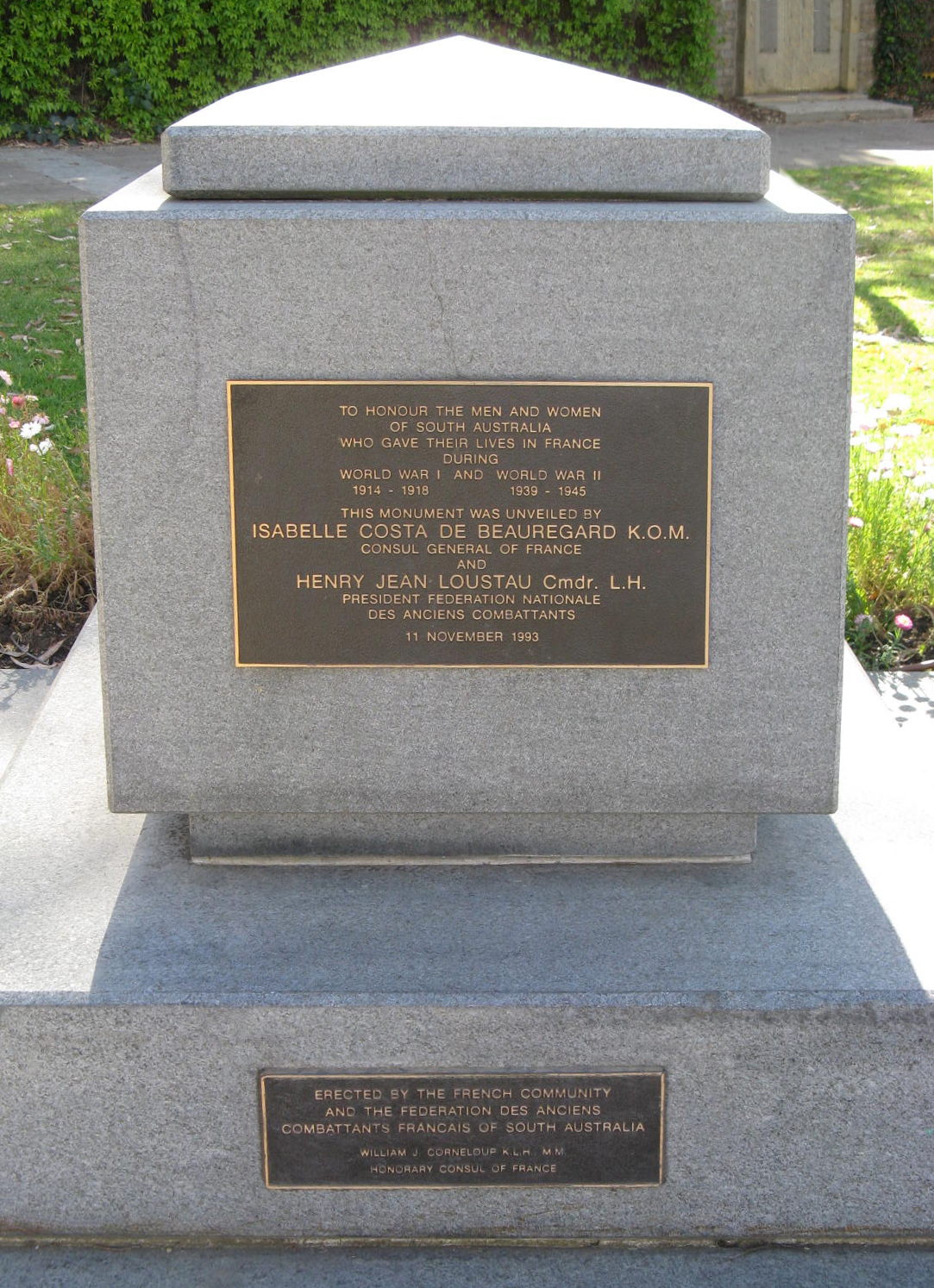
France

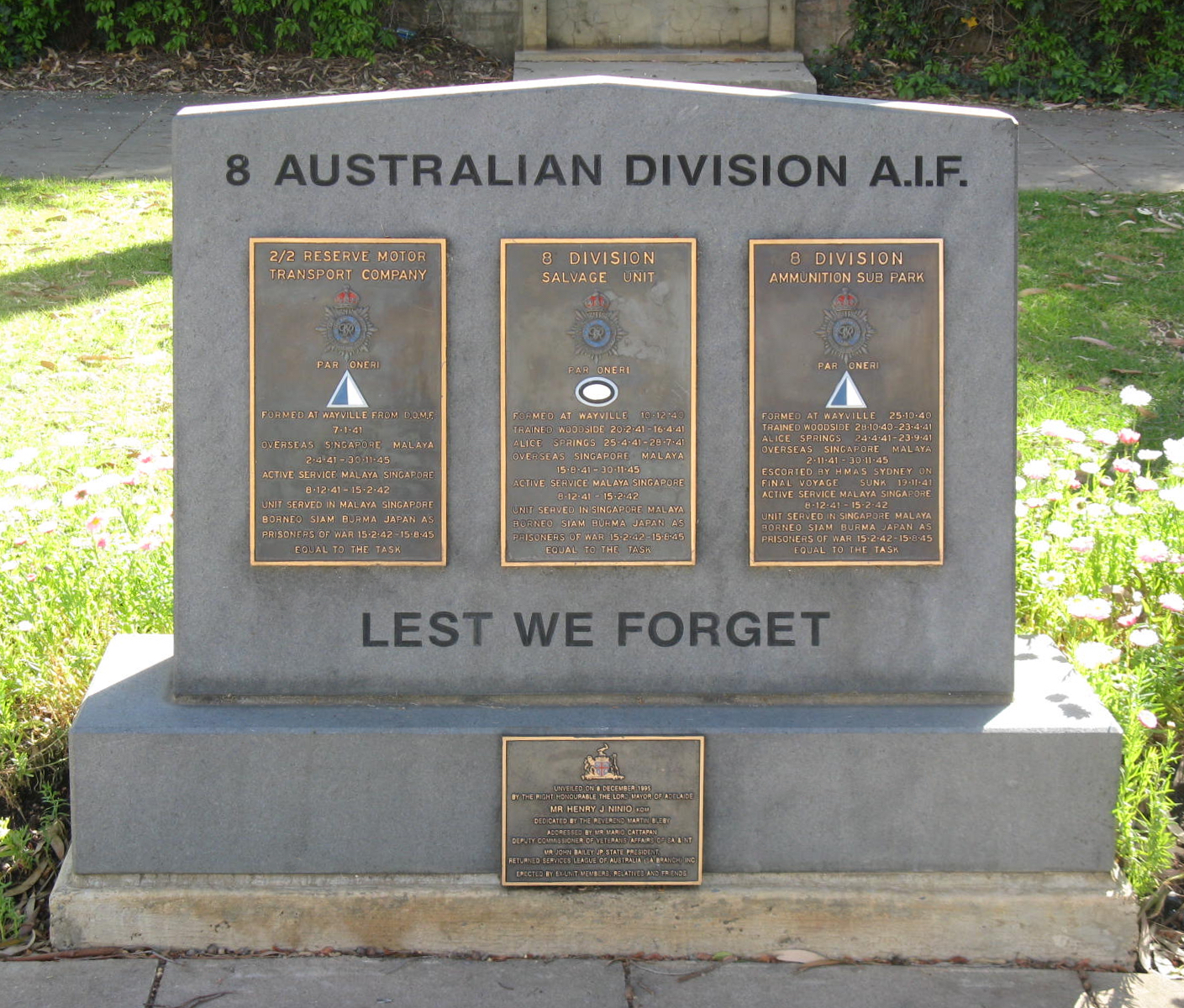
8th Division

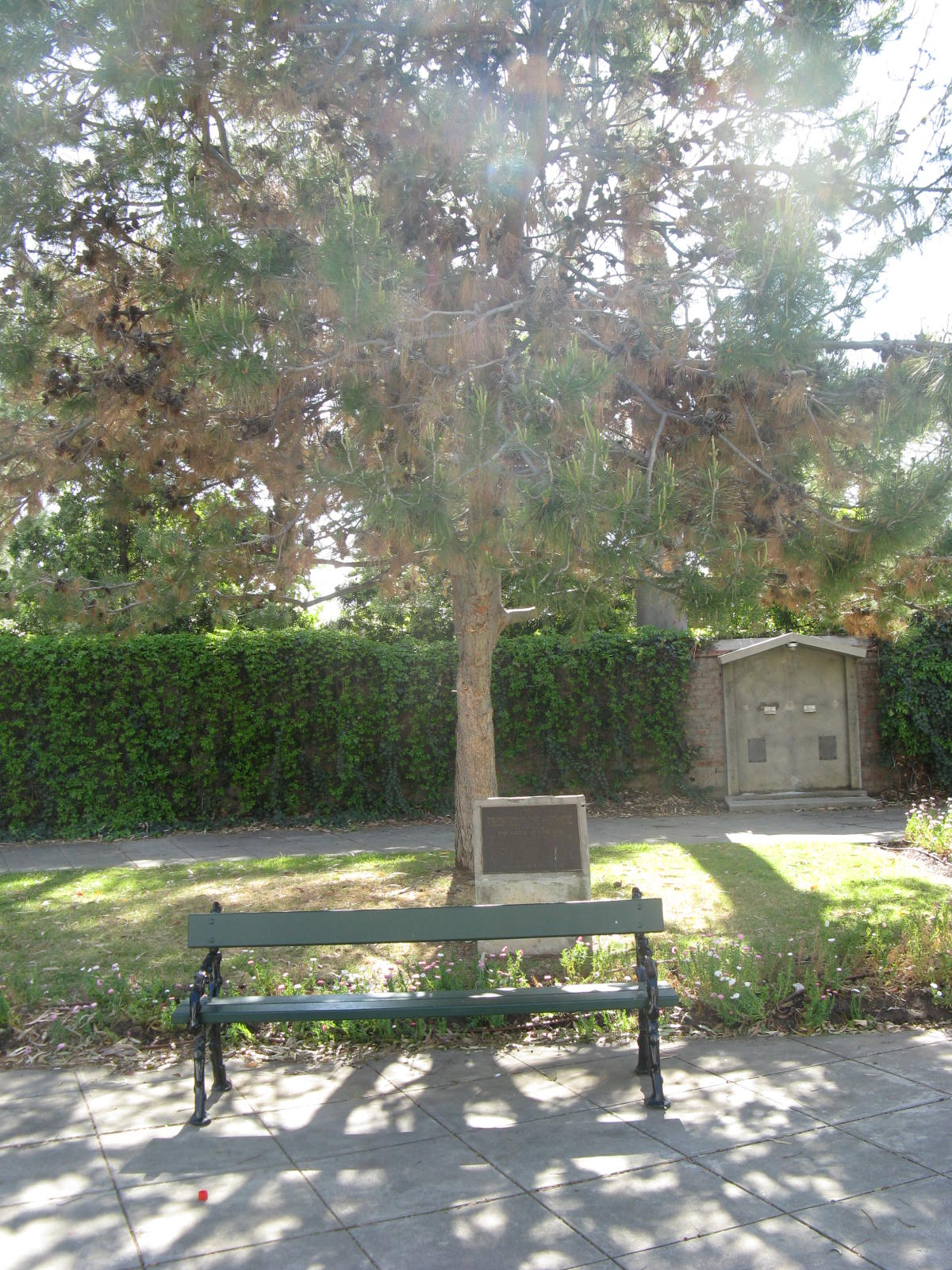
Lone Pine and battle.

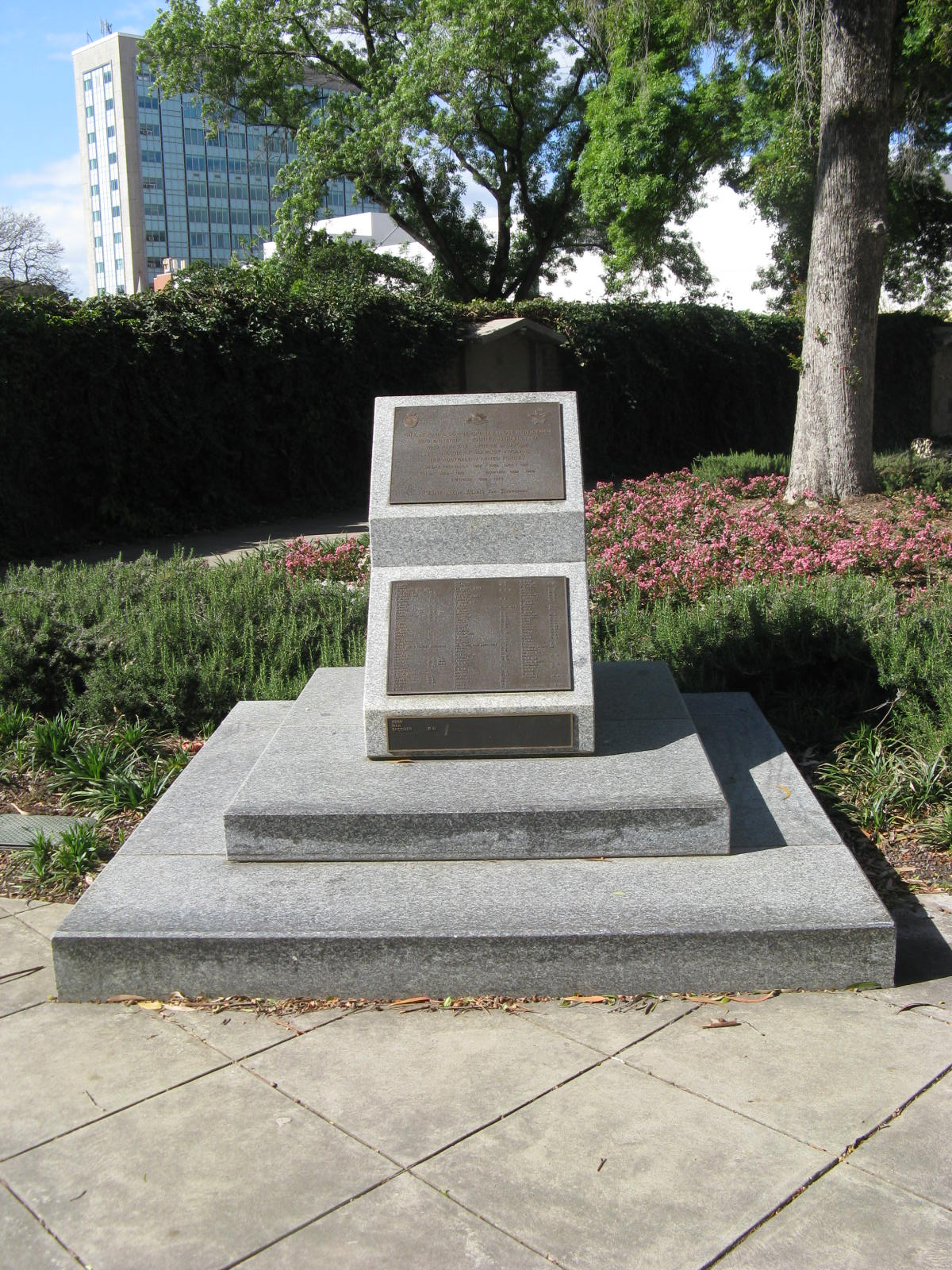
South-East Asia and Korea

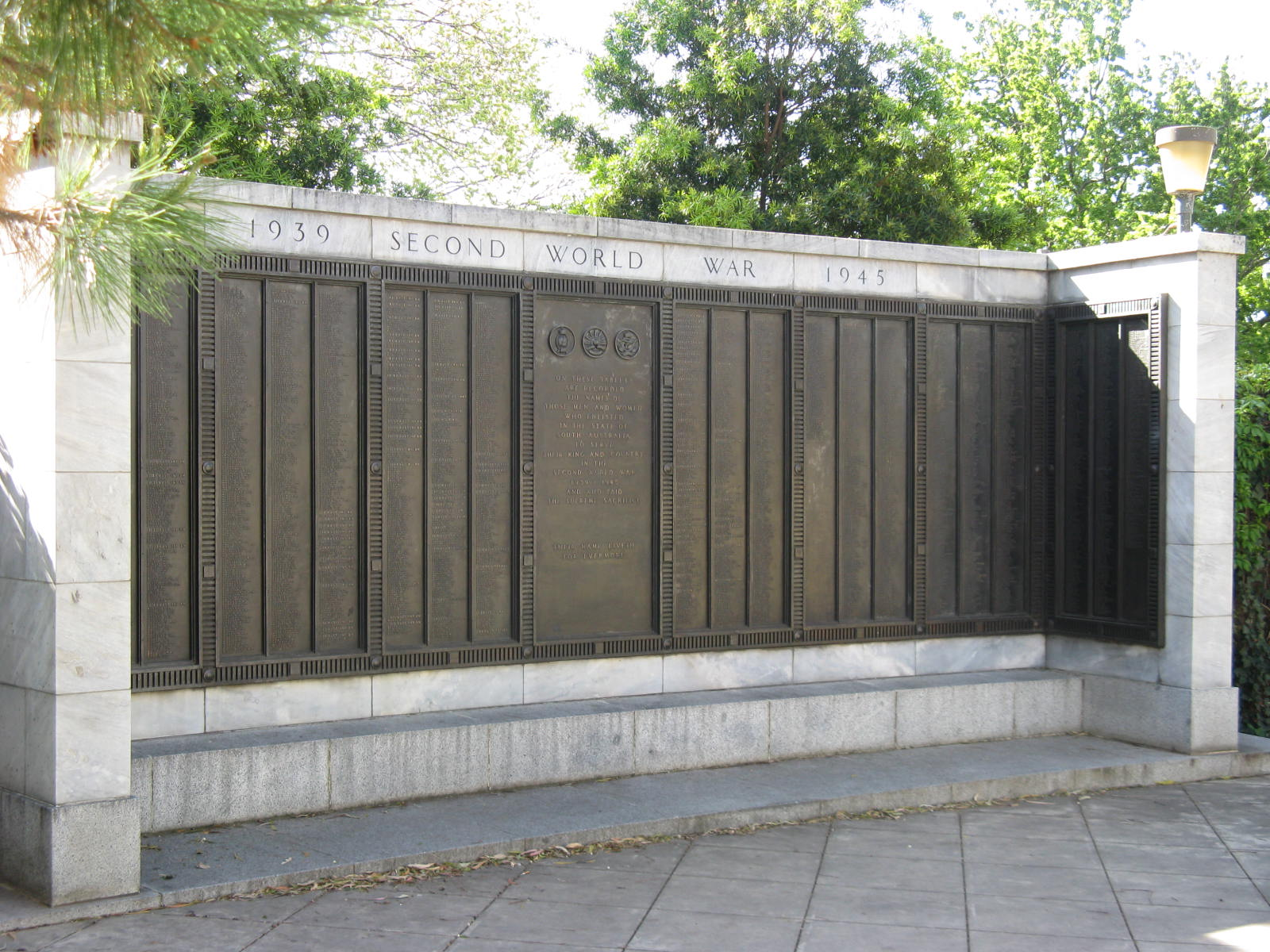
WWII Honour roll

== Kintore Avenue ==
=== The Institute building ===
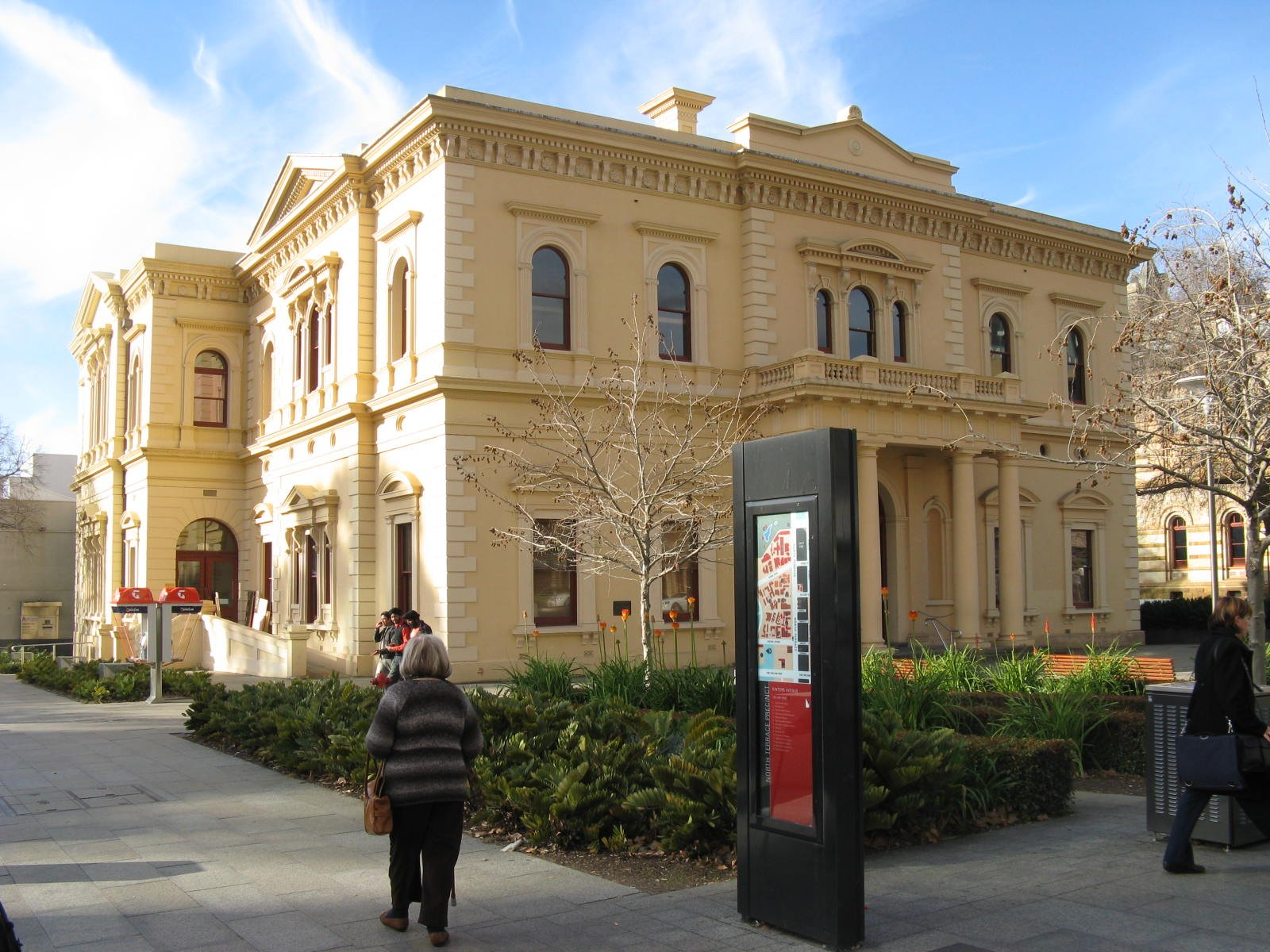

=== Statue of Edward VII ===
Huge bronze statue of Edward VII by Sir Bertram Mackennal, K.C.V.O., R.A.
Pedestal designed by sculptor. Paid for by public subscription. Unveiled 15 July 1920.

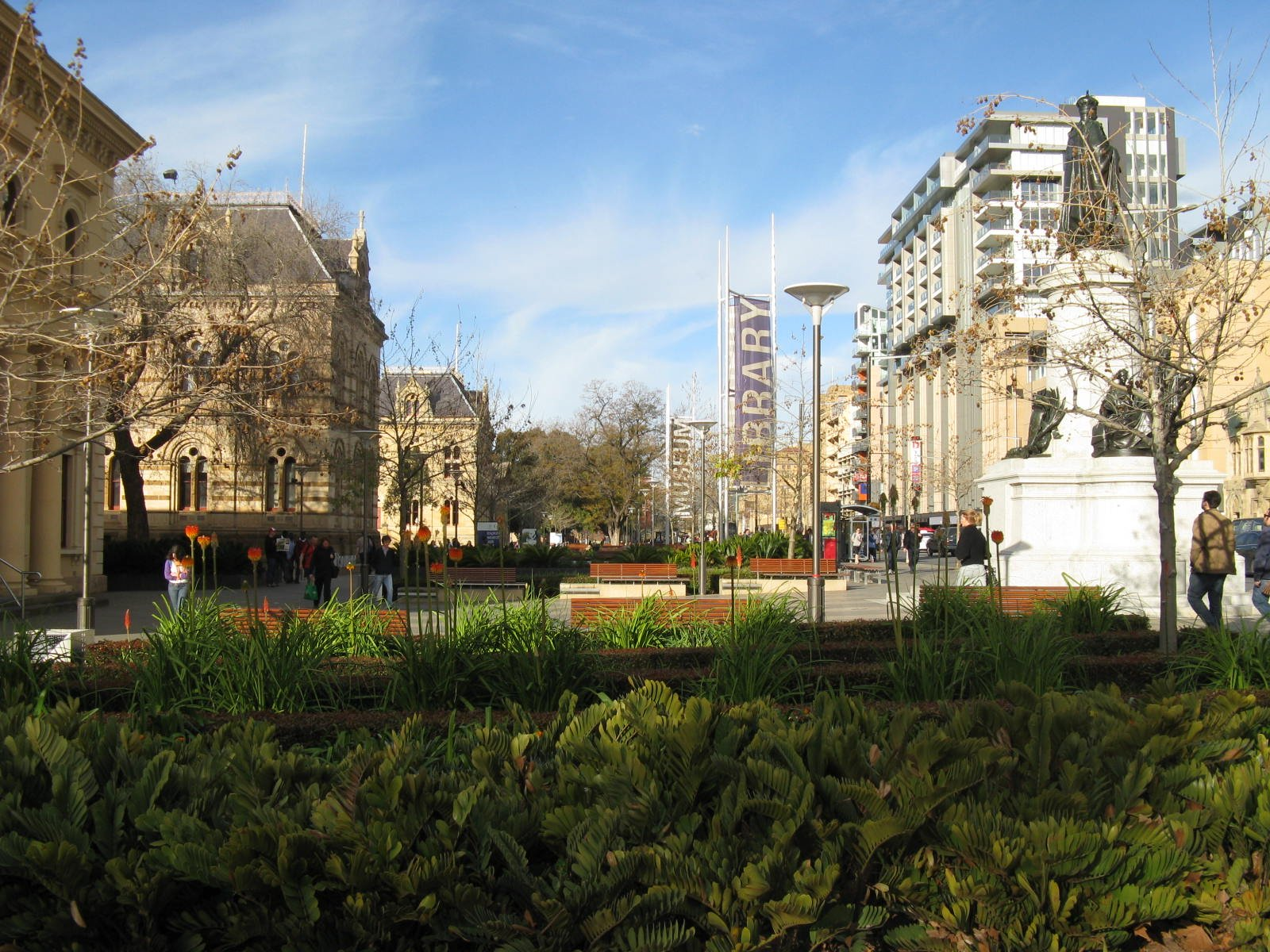
Back of statue to right

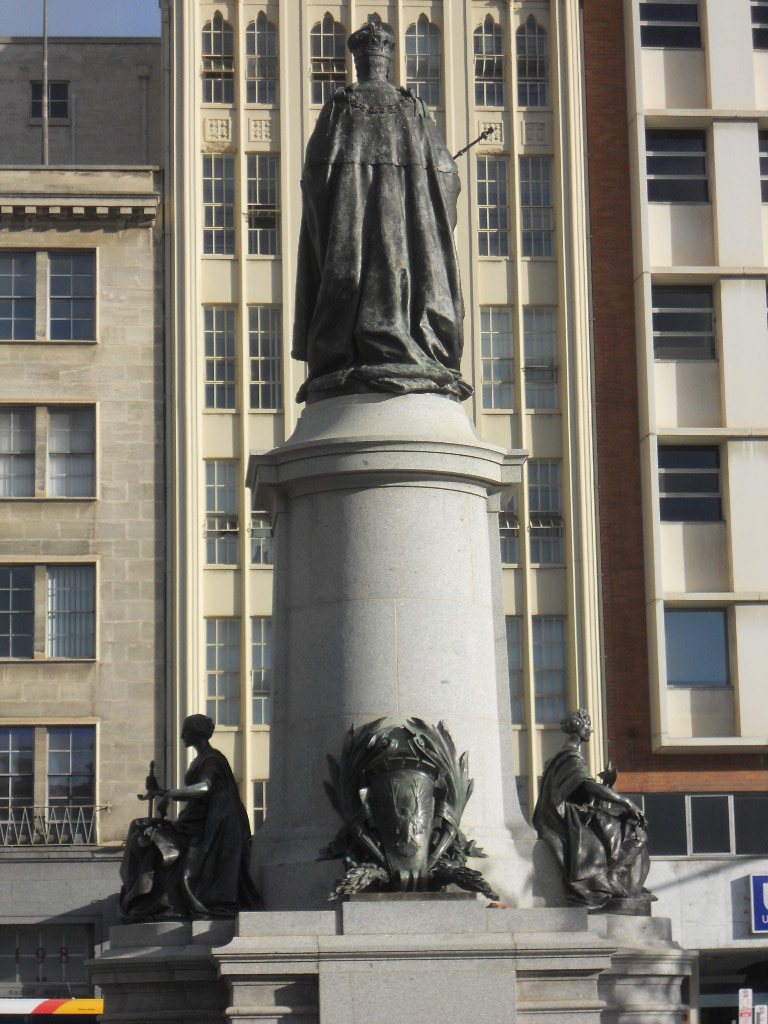
Back of statue

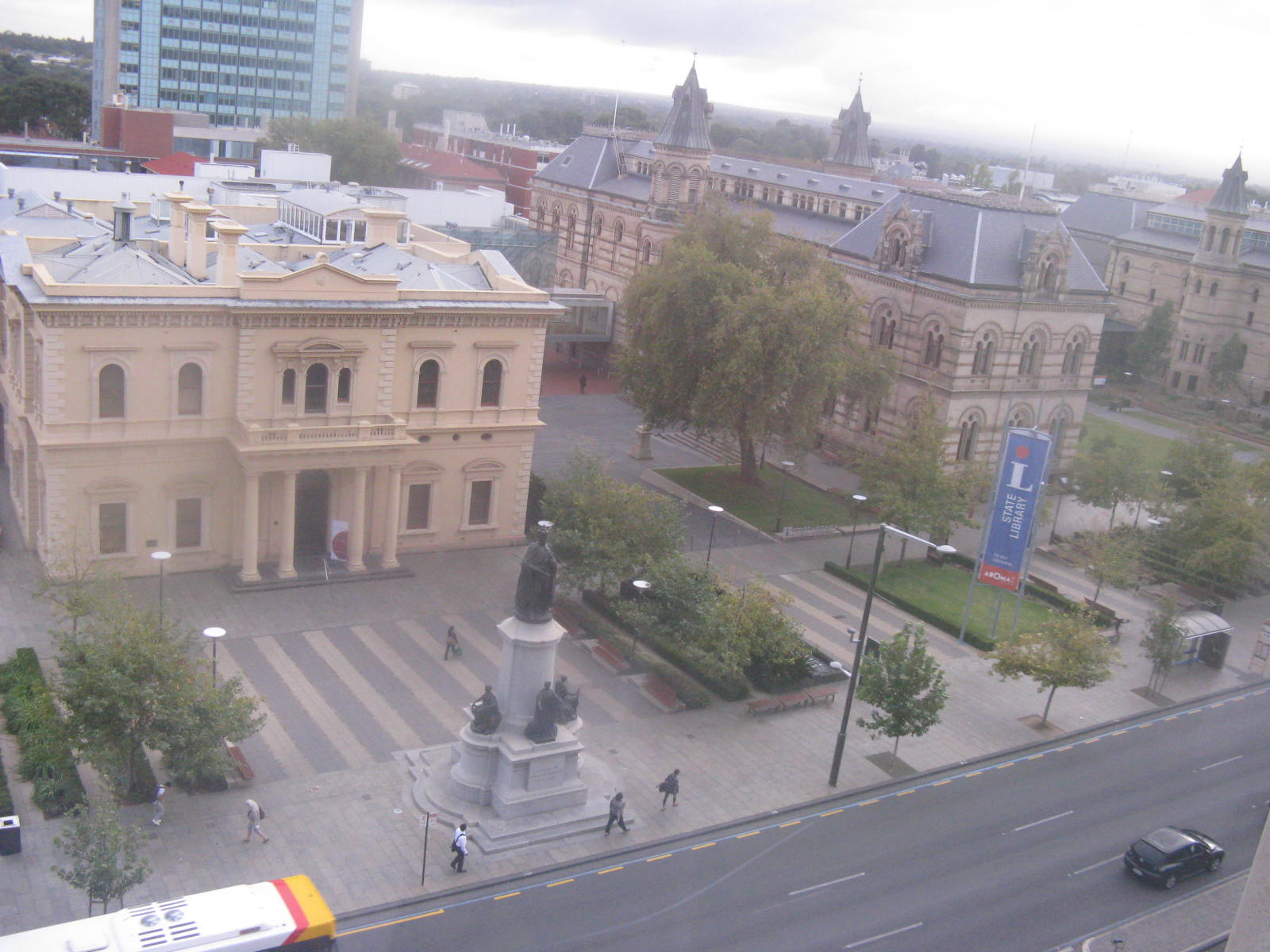

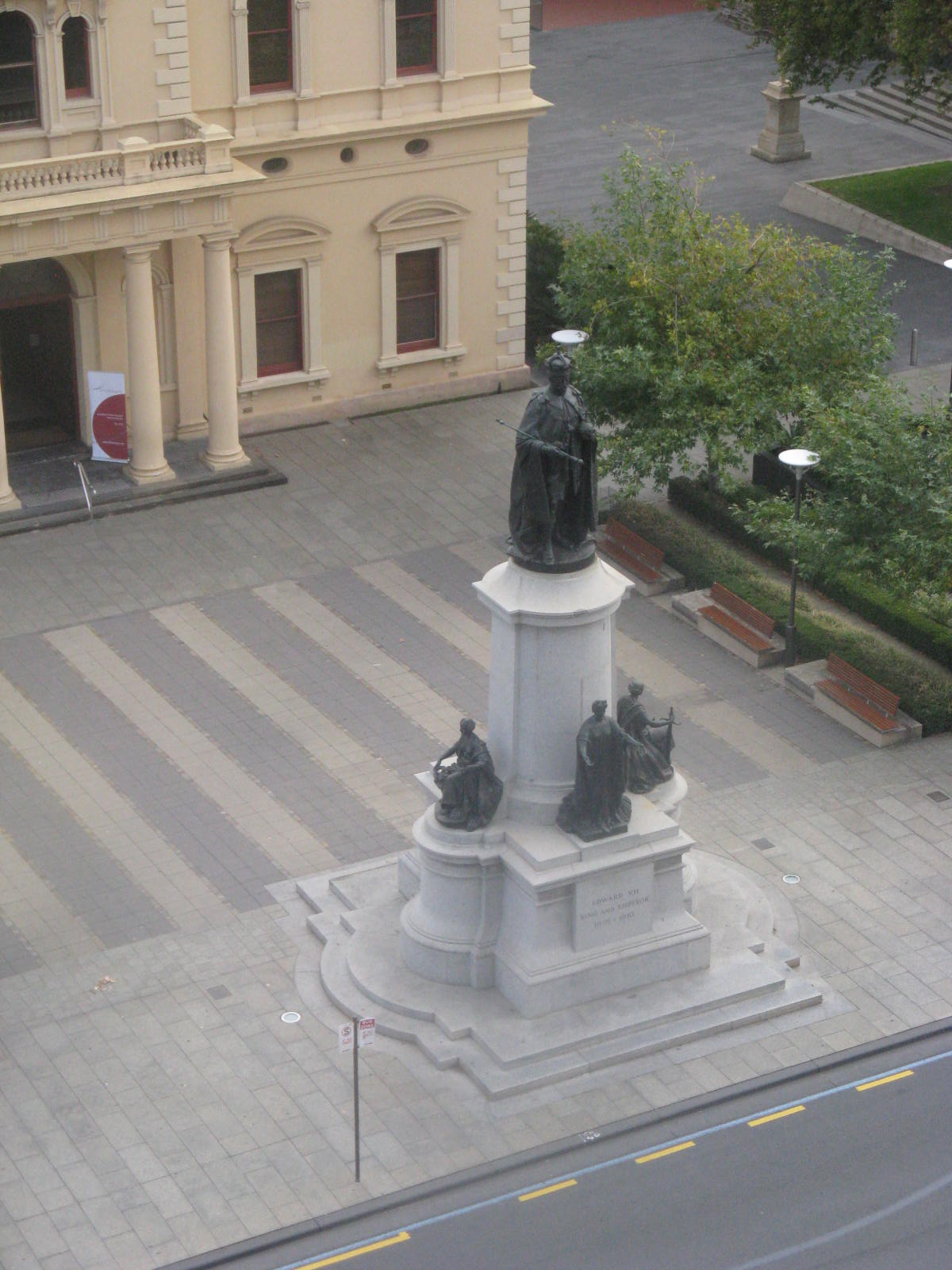

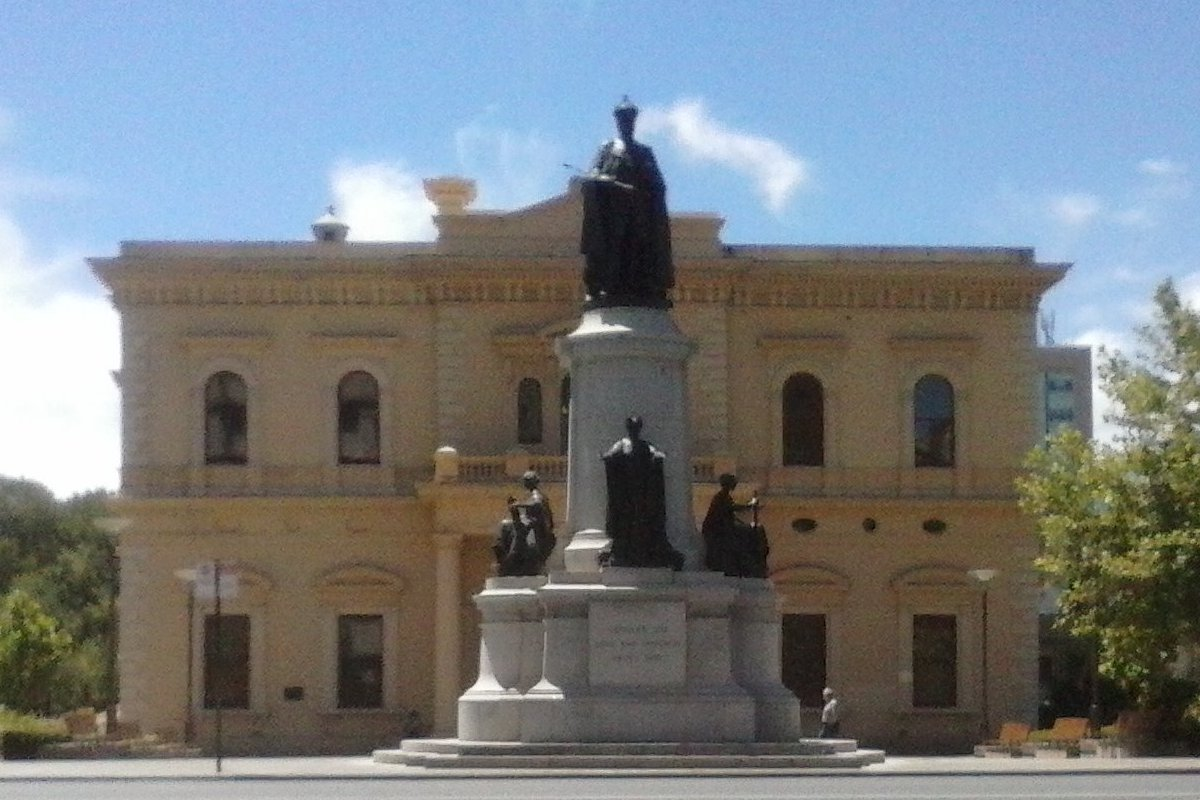

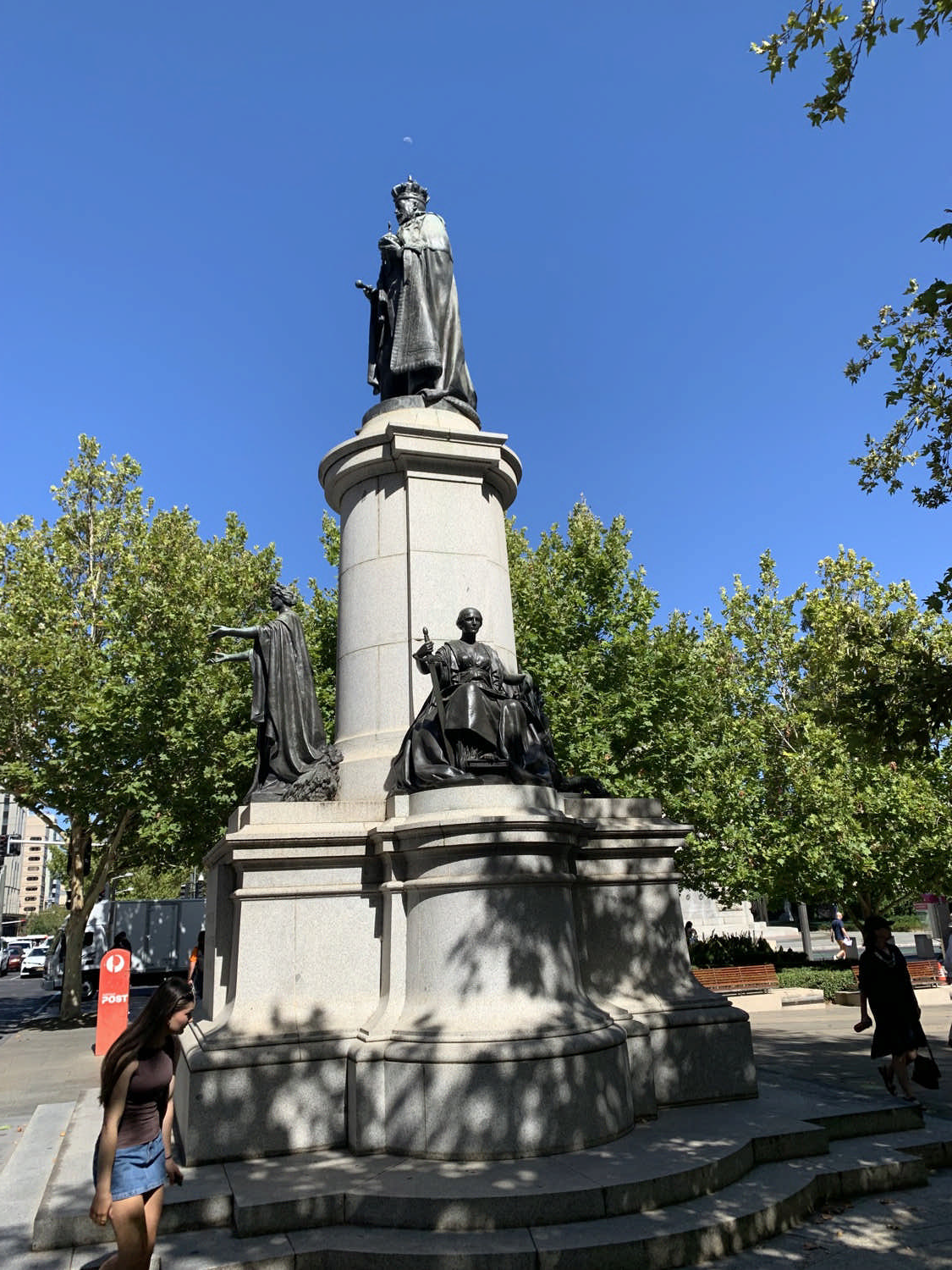
Statue of King Edward VII aligned underneath the daytime moon.

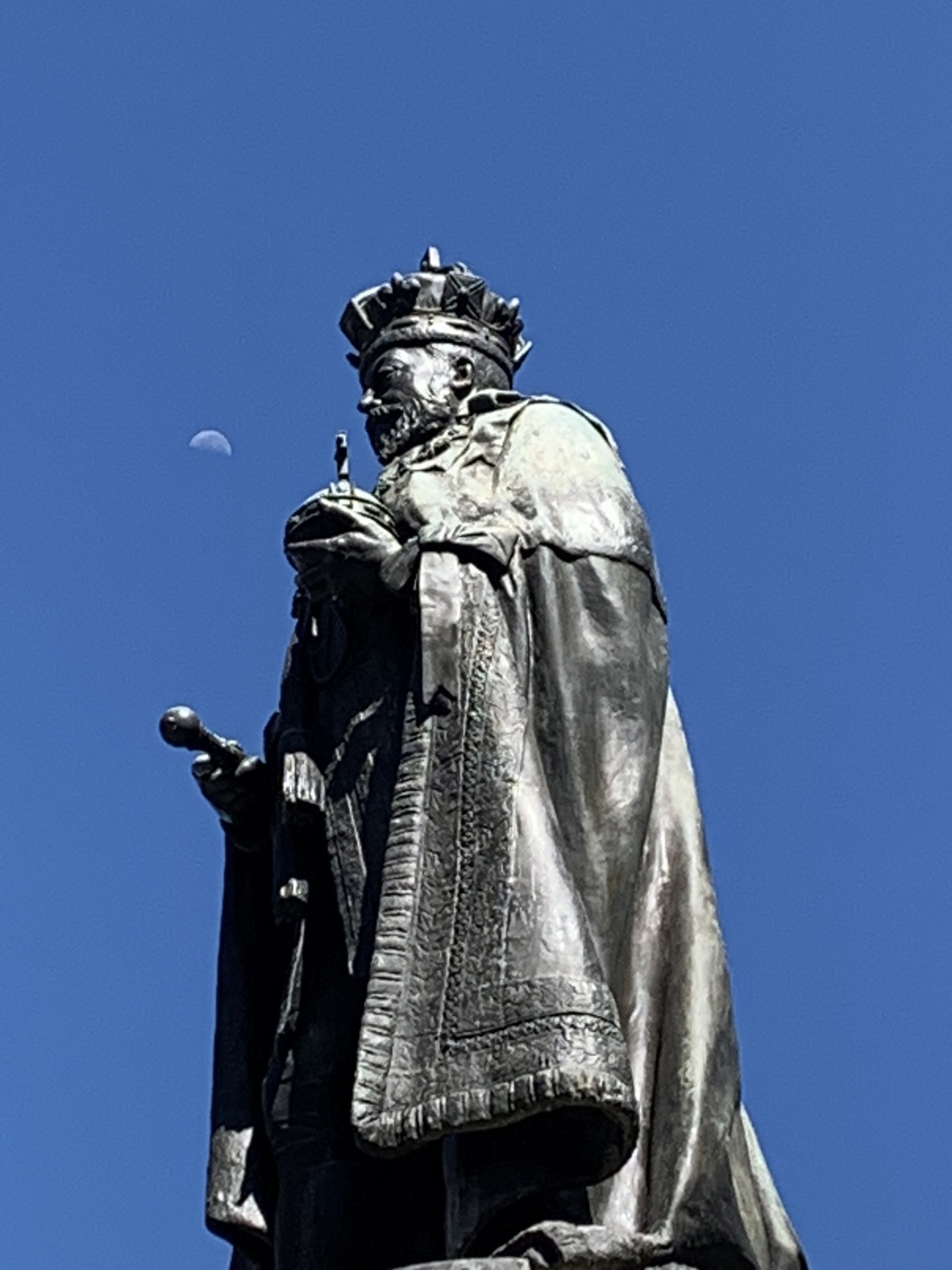
Statue of King Edward VII aligned with the daytime moon, zoomed in.

=== State Library of South Australia ===
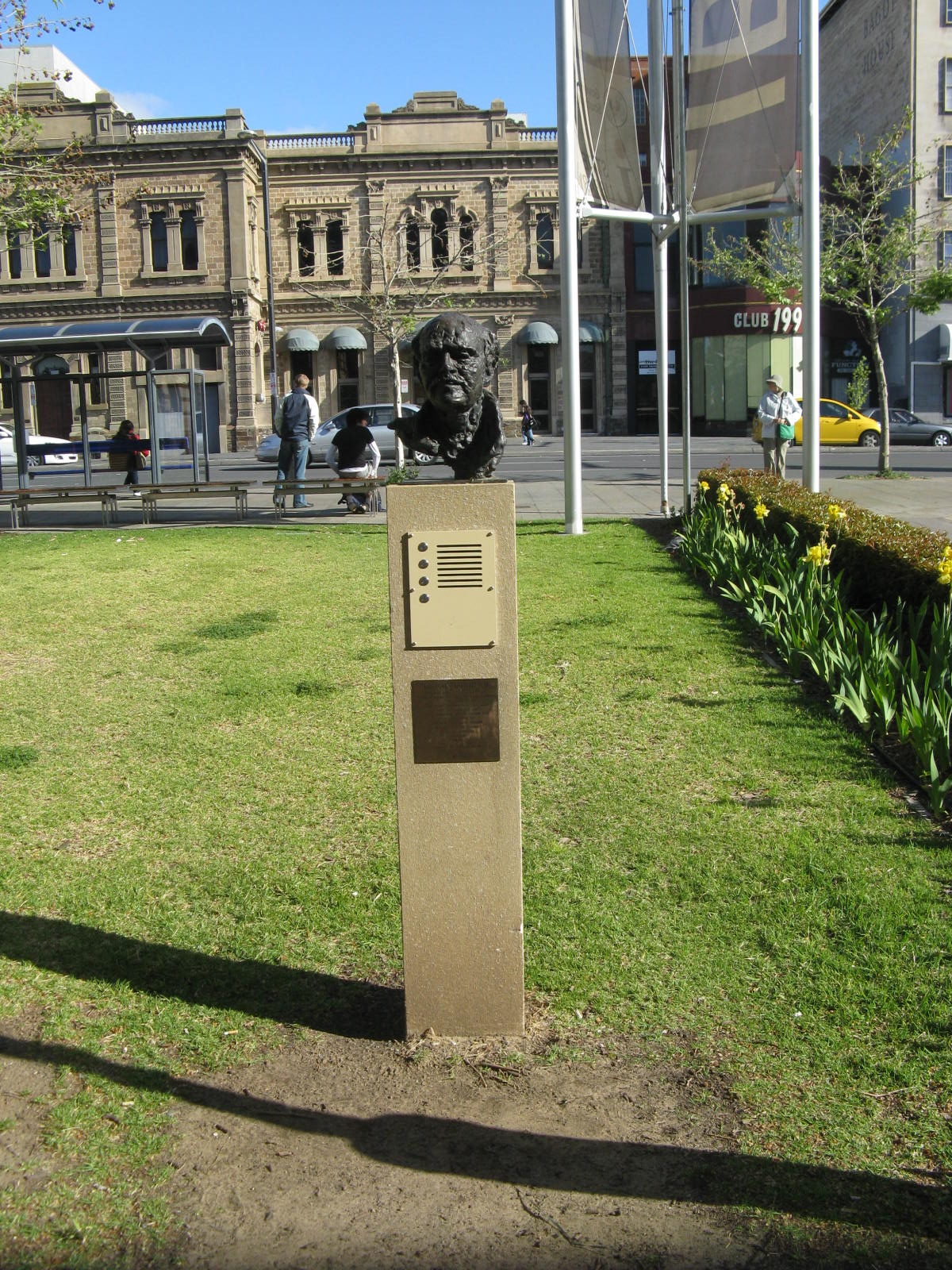
John Dowie by John Woffinden, 2006

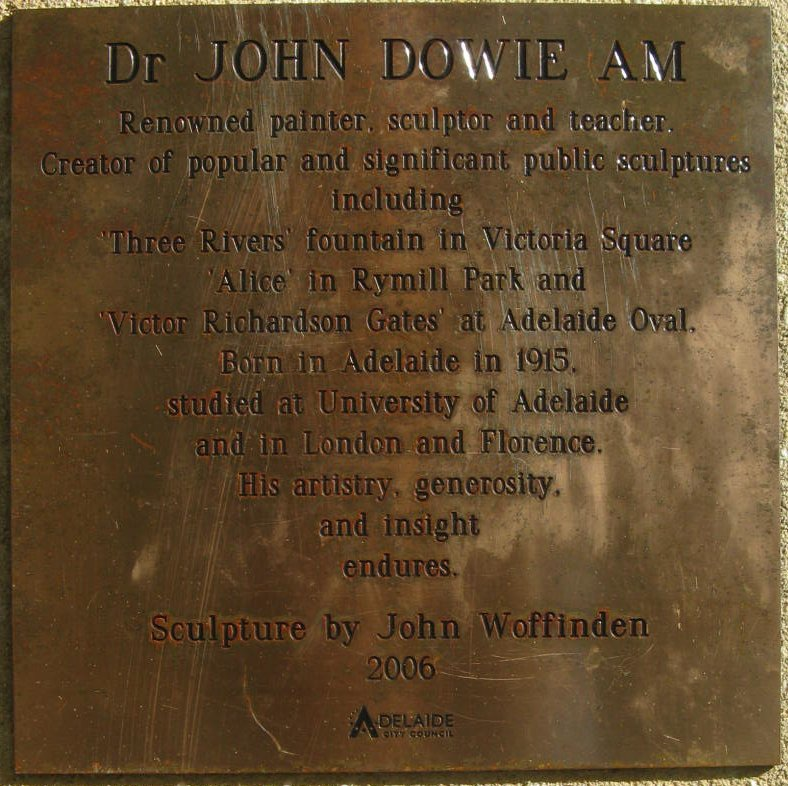
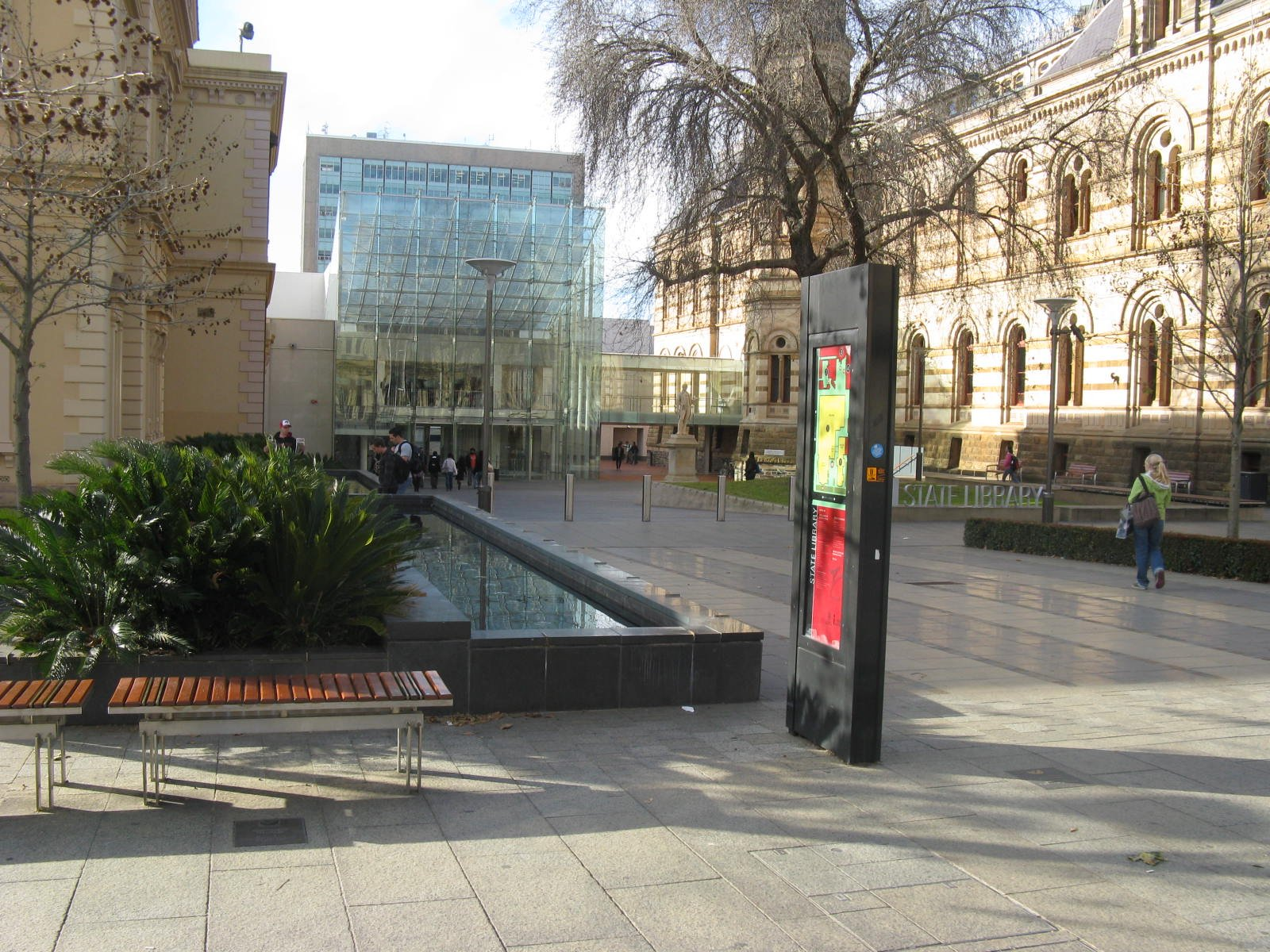

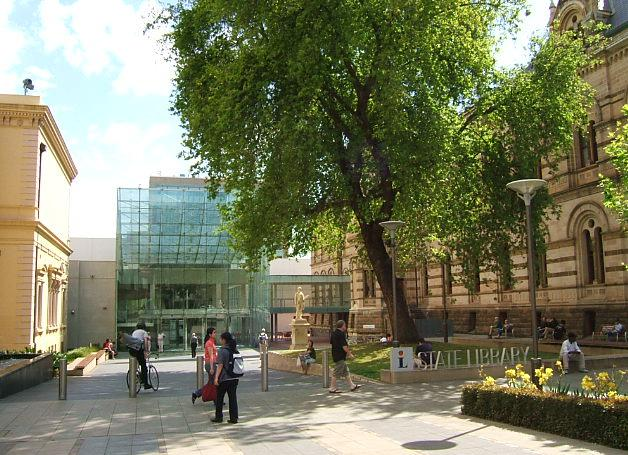

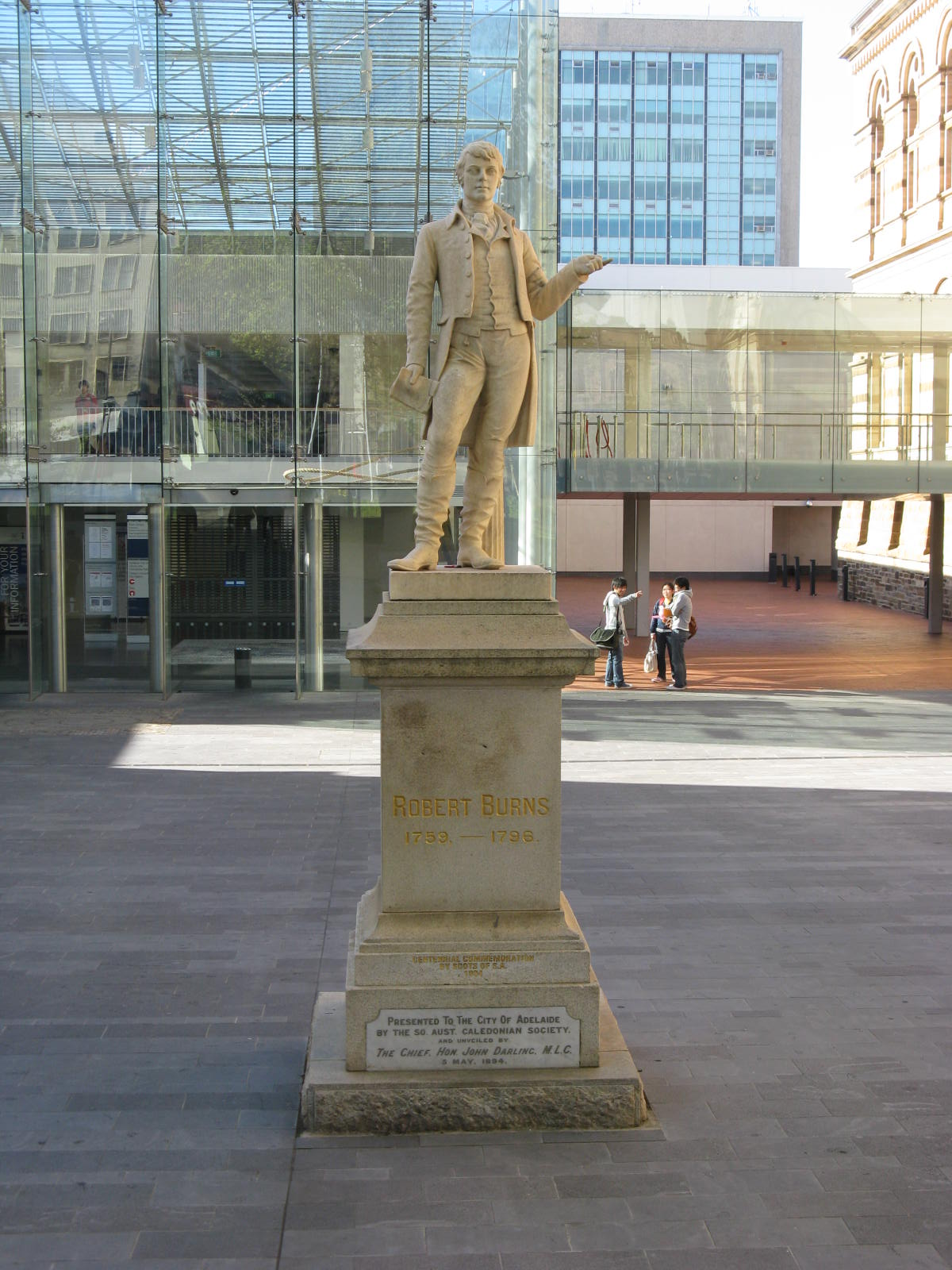
Robert Burns by WJ Maxwell 1894

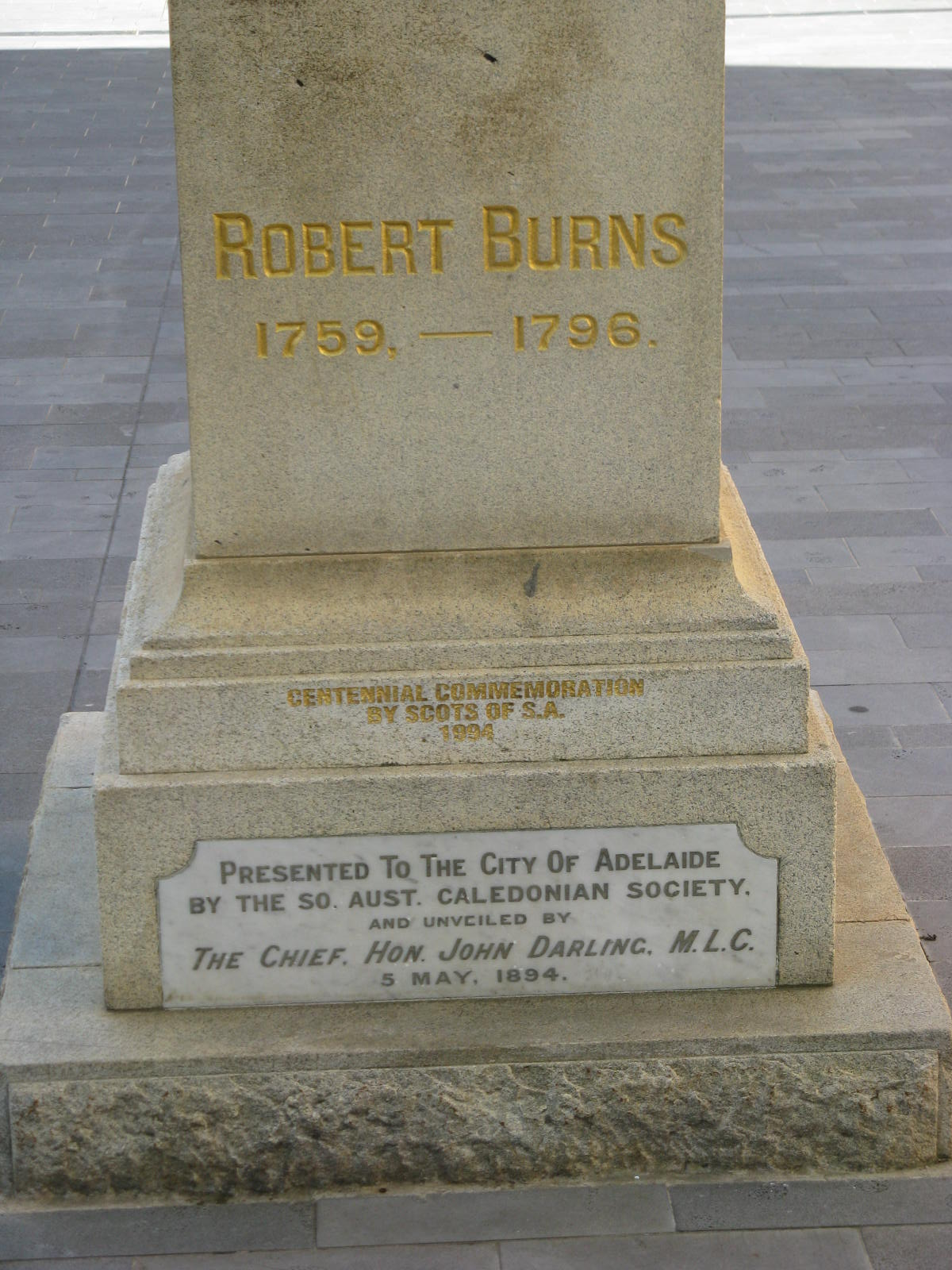

The statue of Robert Burns bears the honour of being the first statue carved in Adelaide. It was presented by the Caledonian Society, and unveiled on 5 May 1894 by the Chief of the Caledonian Society (Hon. J. Darling, M.L.C.).

=== Mortlock Library ===
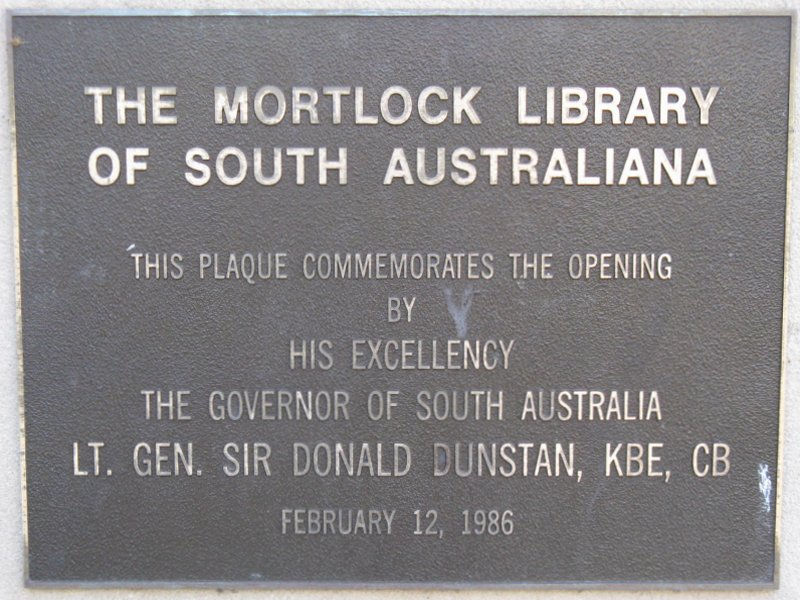

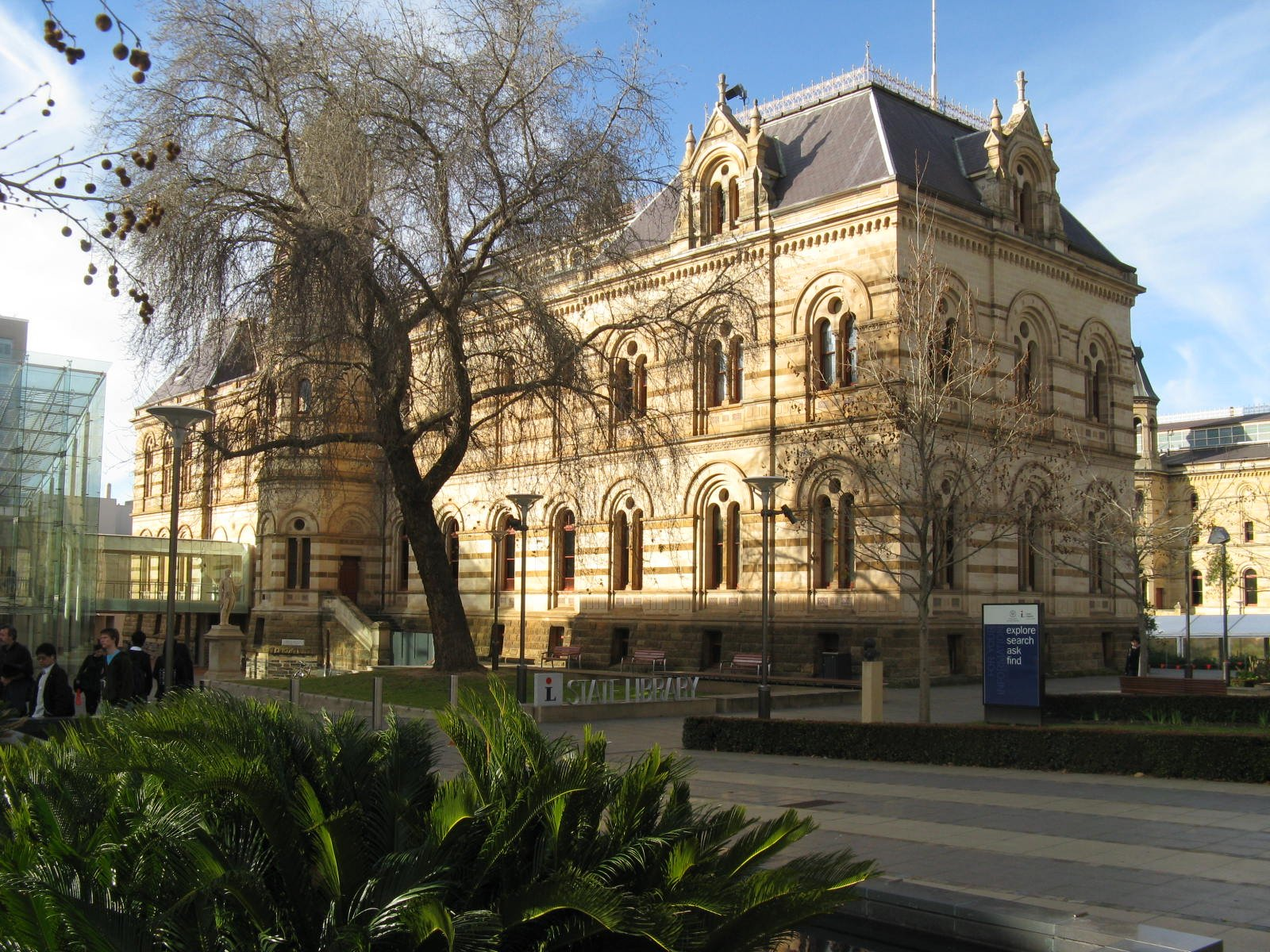

=== Museum of Natural History ===
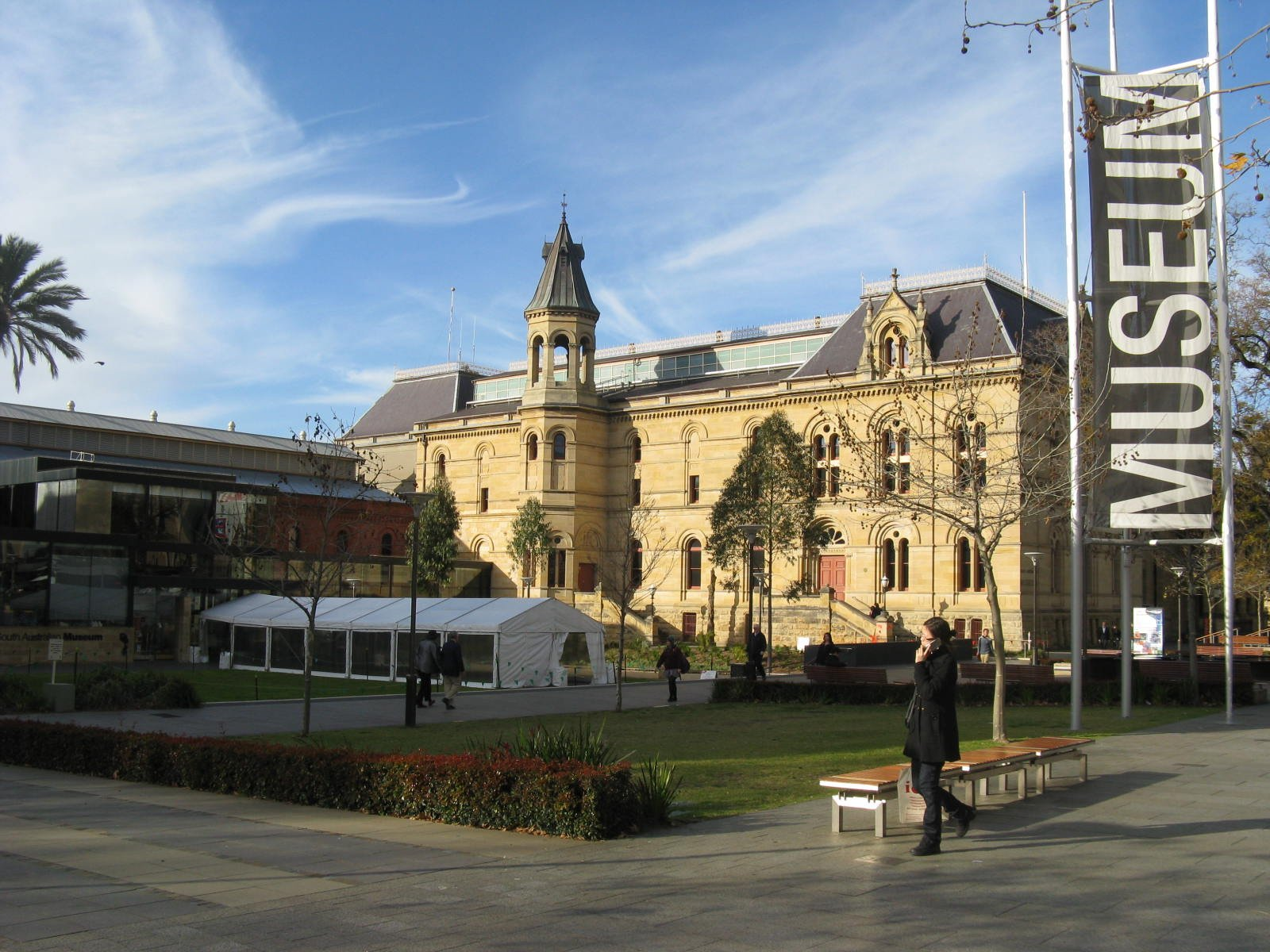

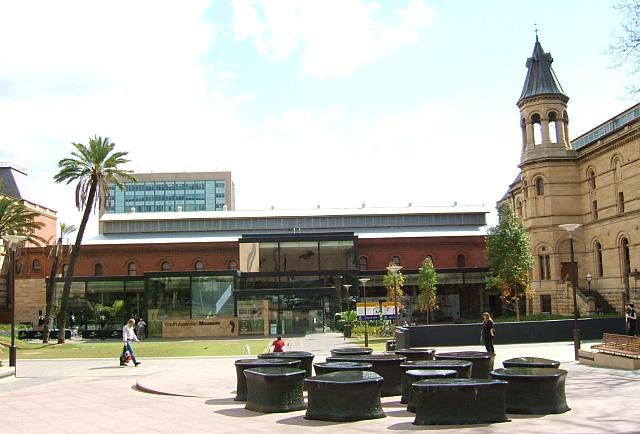

=== Art Gallery of South Australia ===
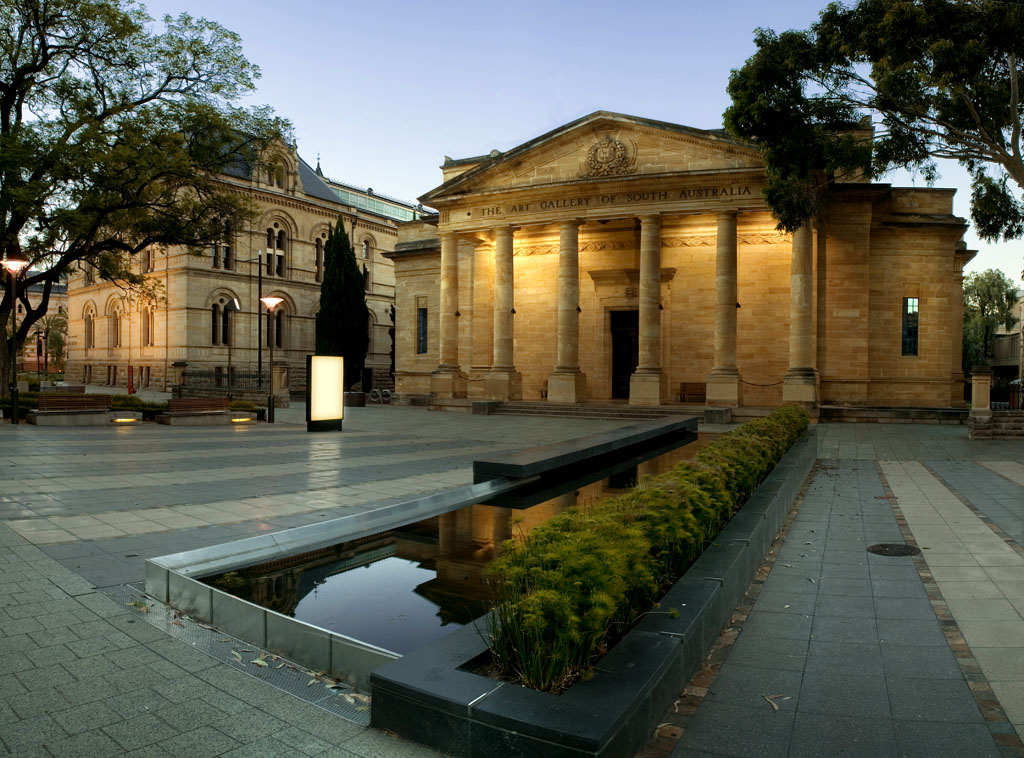

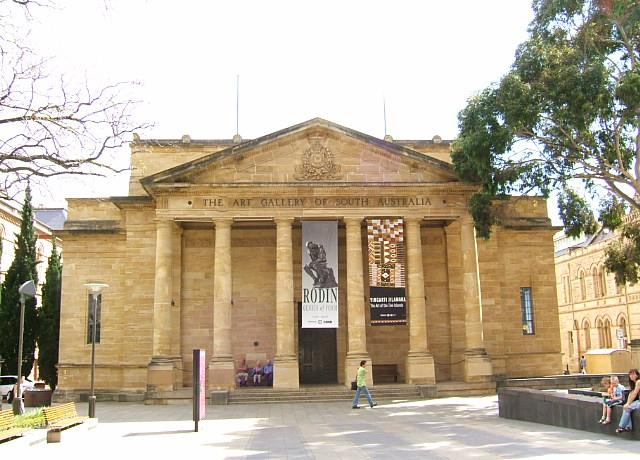

== University of Adelaide ==
=== Mitchell Building ===
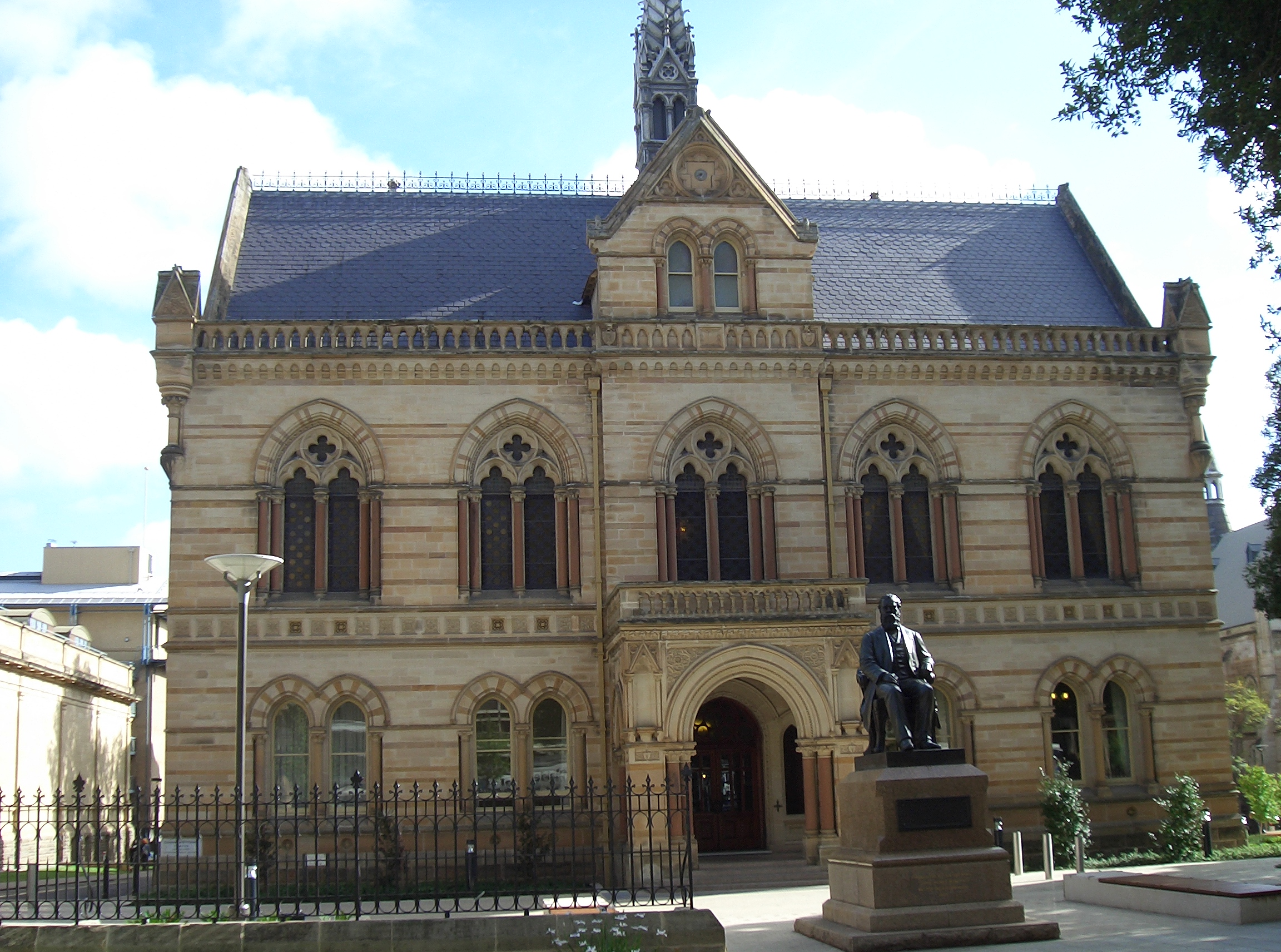

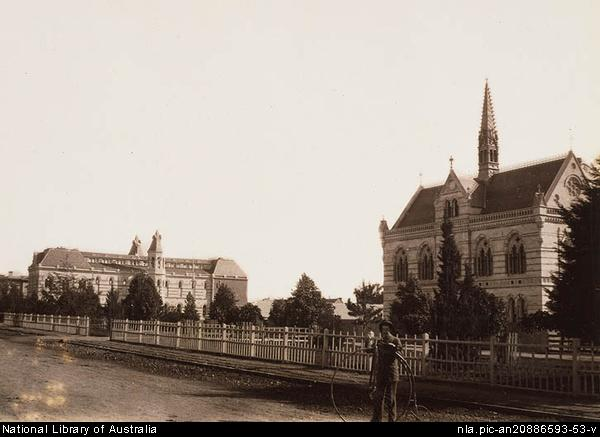
1869

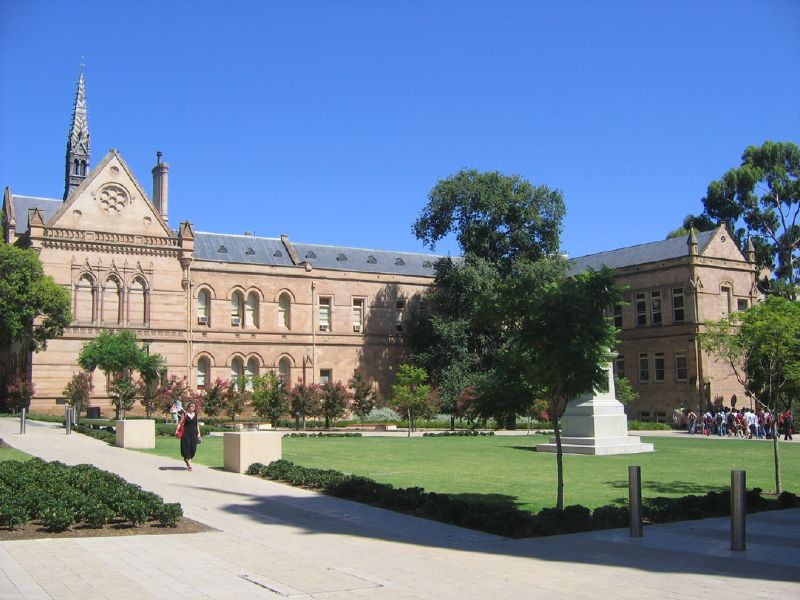
East face

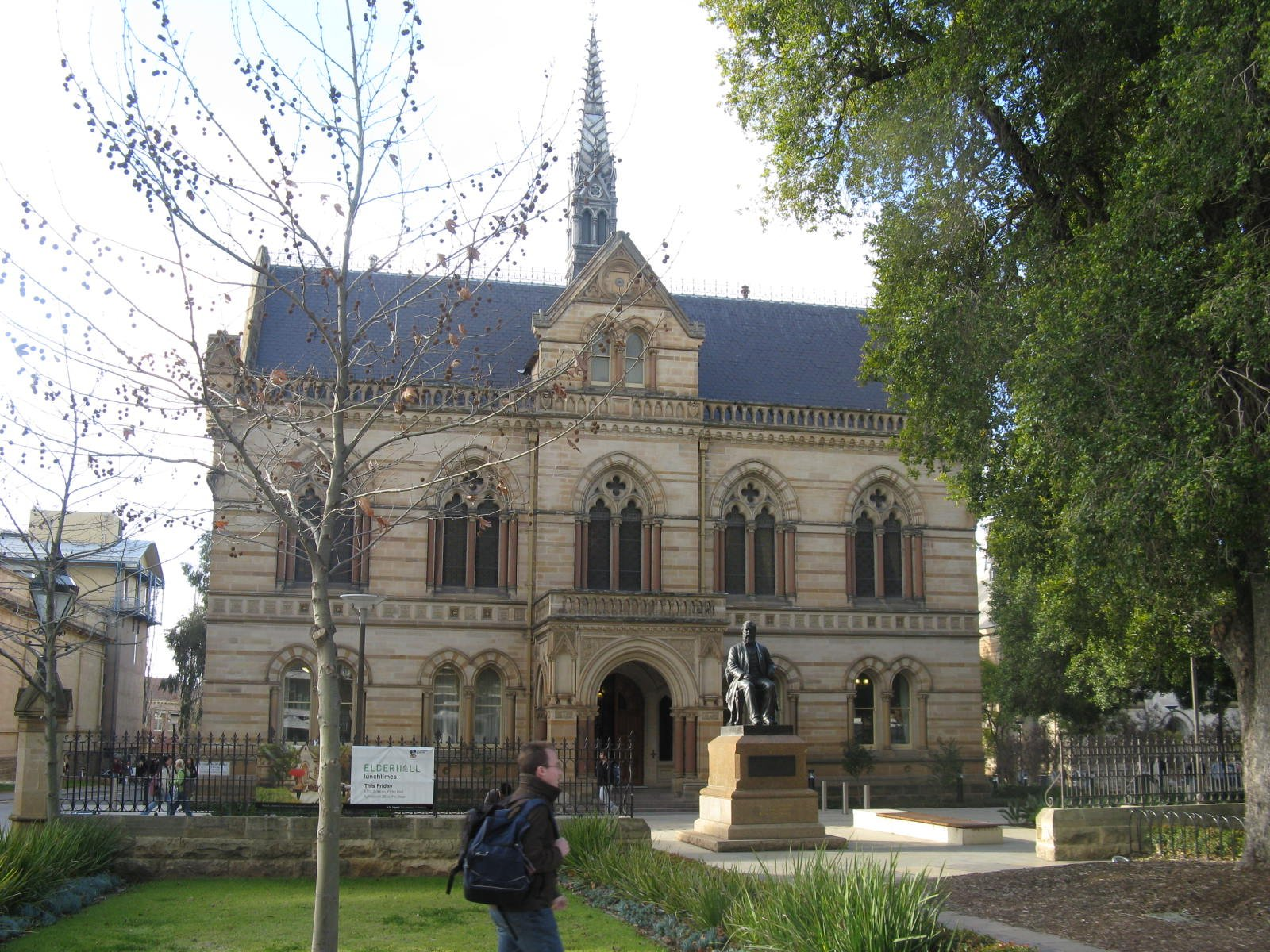
Winter 2008

Statue of Sir Walter Watson Hughes (1803–1887)

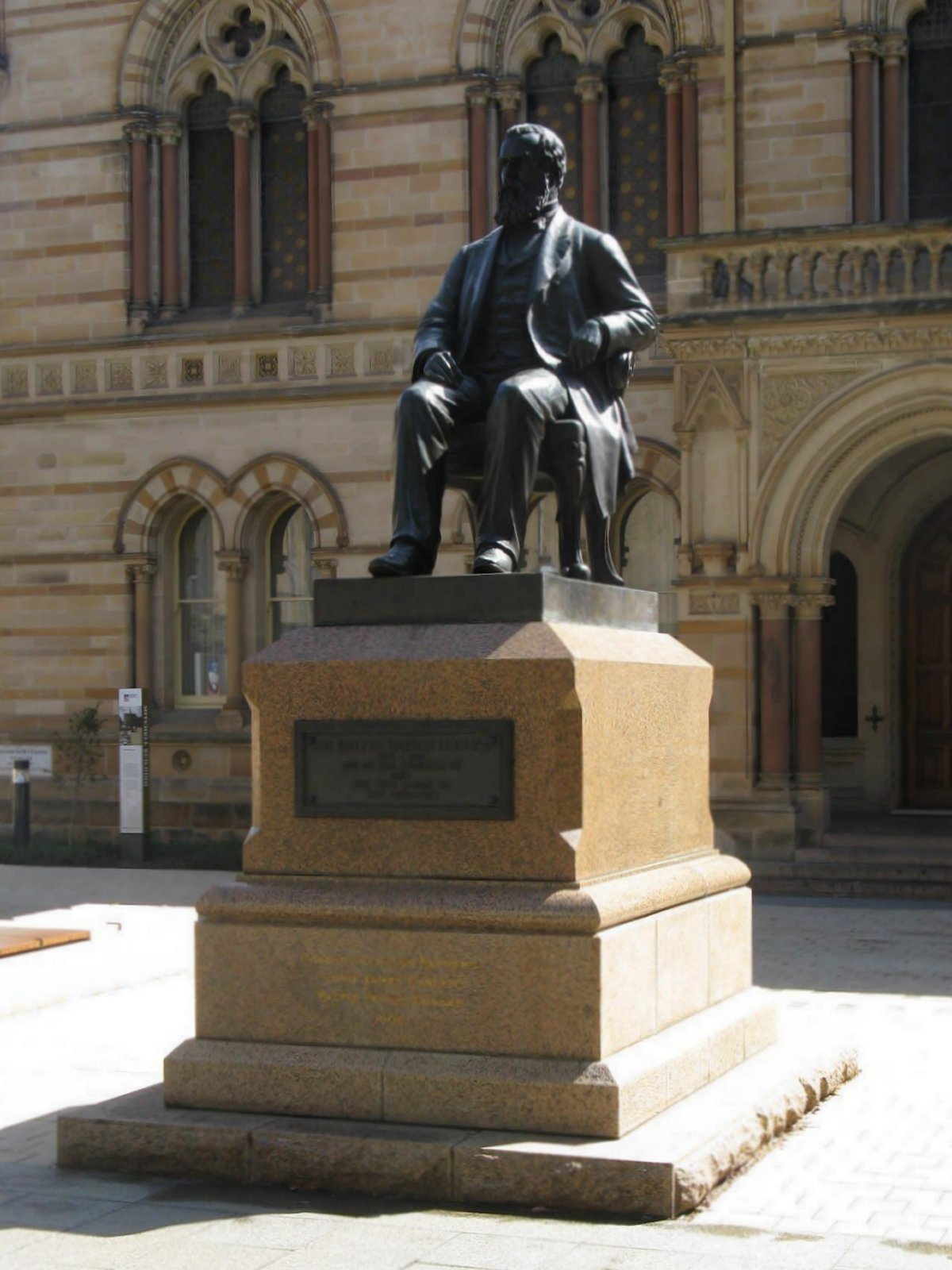

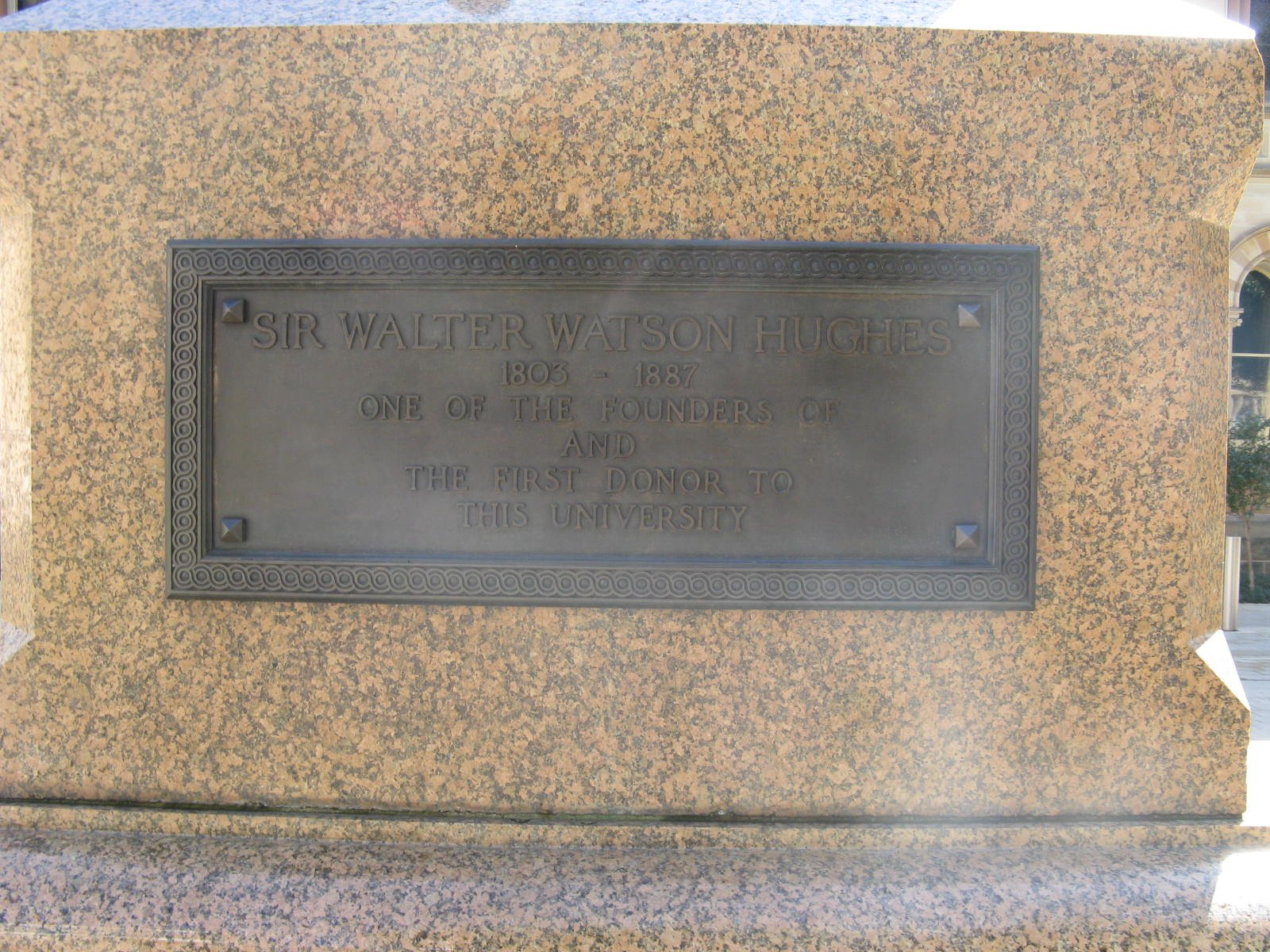

Statue of Sir Samuel Way
The Right Hon. Sir S.J. Way, Bart., P.C, D.C.L., LL.D. by Alfred Drury, R.A., A.R.C.A. 1924
Designed by Walter Bagot, F.R.I.B.A., F.R.A.I.A. Erected by J. Tillett.
Pedestal of granite. Paid for by public subscription. Unveiled 17 November 1924.

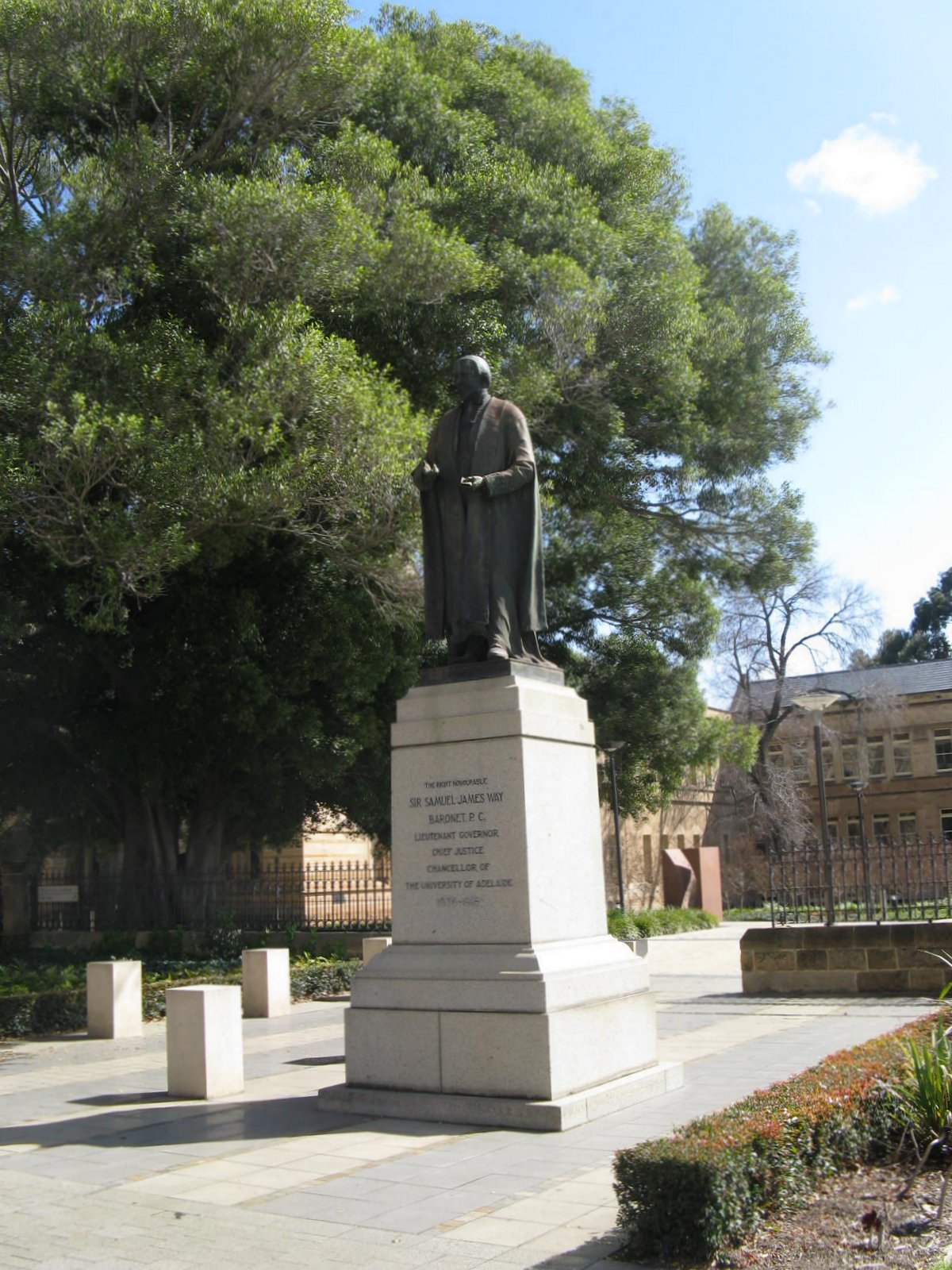

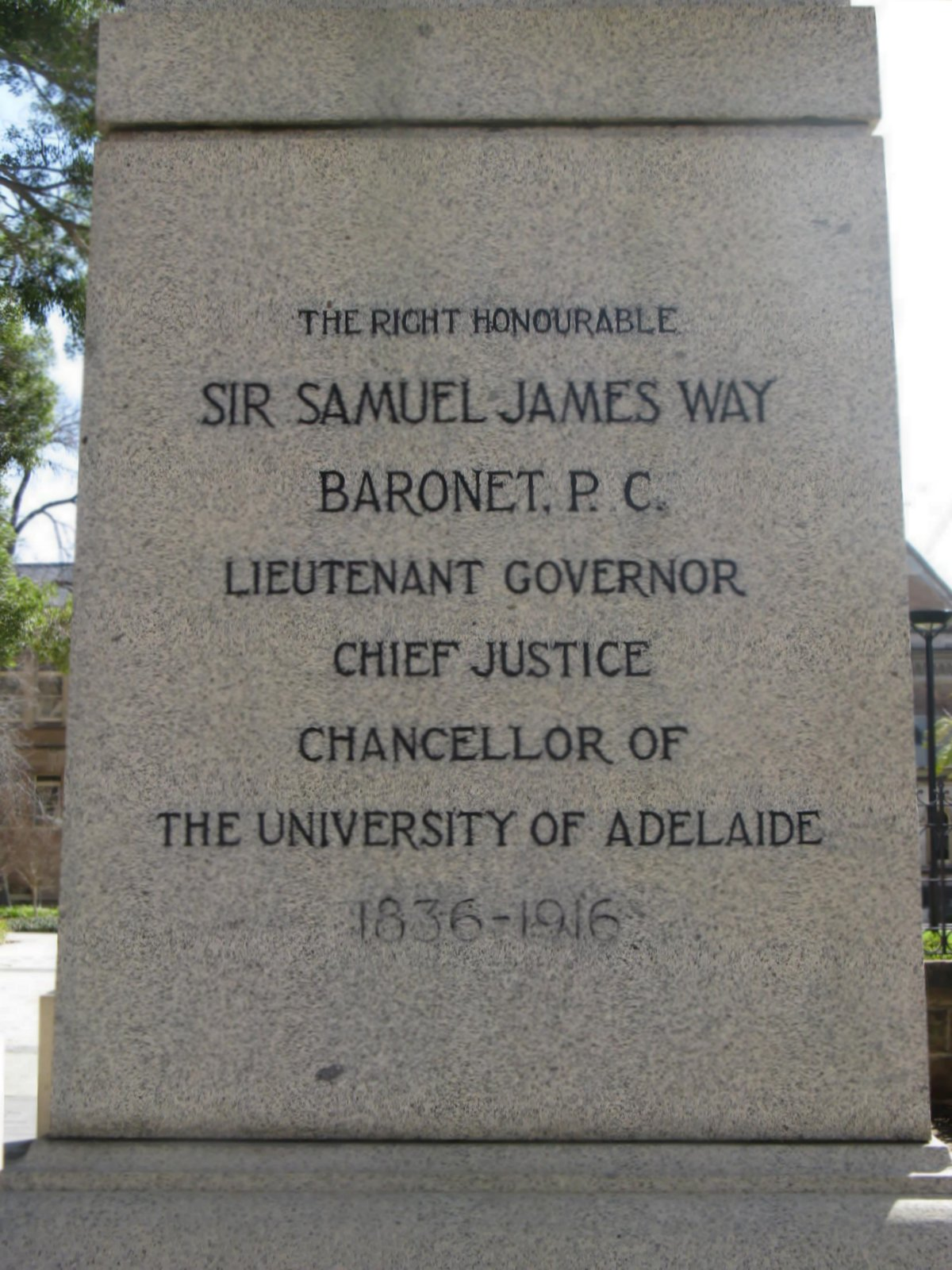

=== Elder Conservatorium of Music ===
Statues of Sir Douglas Mawson and Sir Thomas Elder on Goodman Crescent in front of the Elder Conservatorium

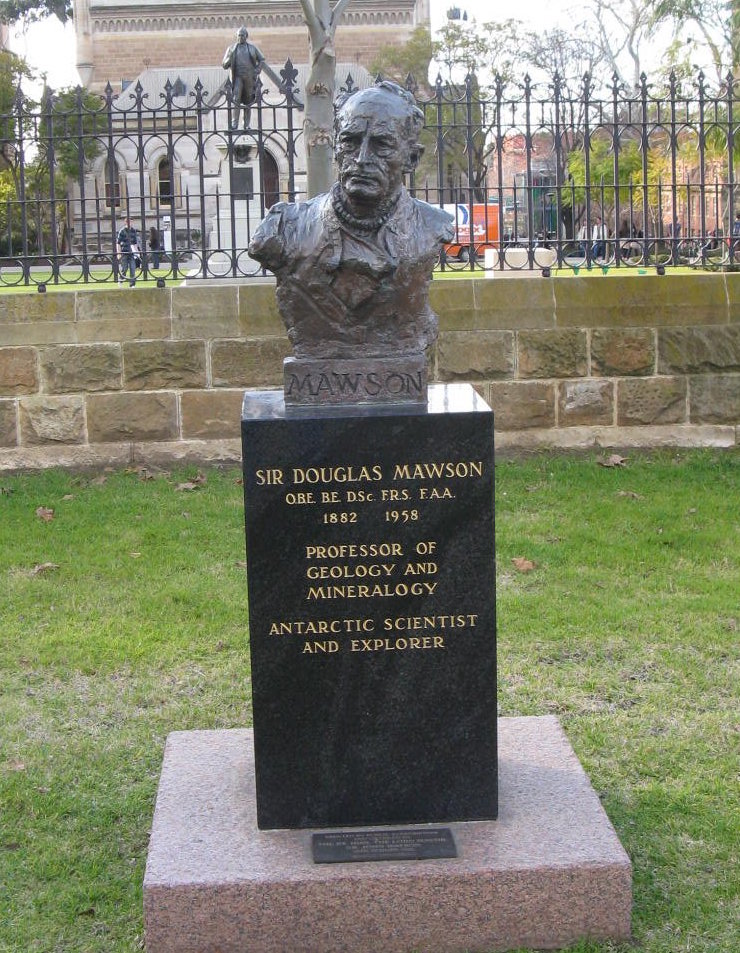
Sir Douglas Mawson
Unveiled by the Lord Mayor, Dr John Watson, on 16 August 1982.

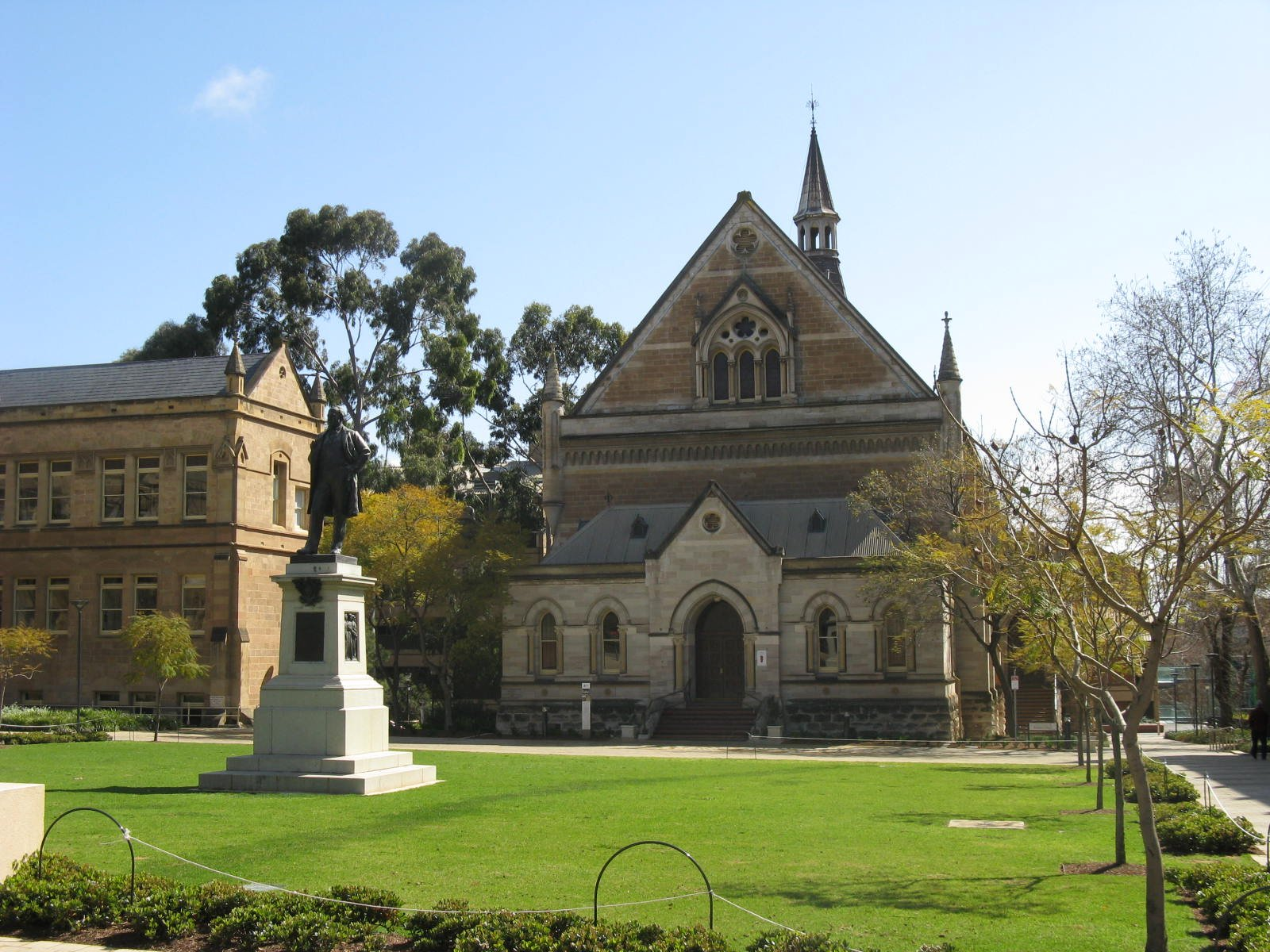
Sir Thomas Elder

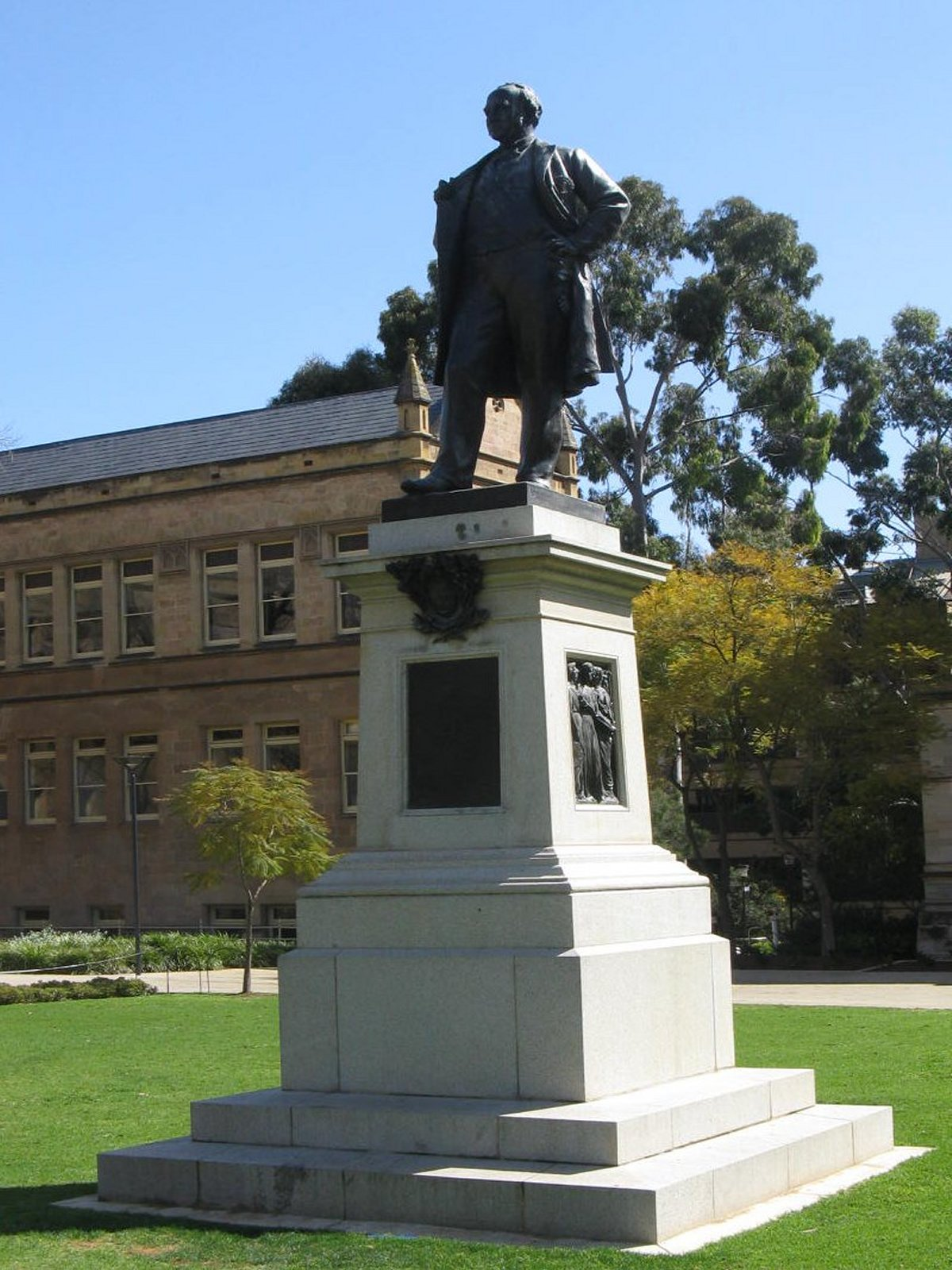

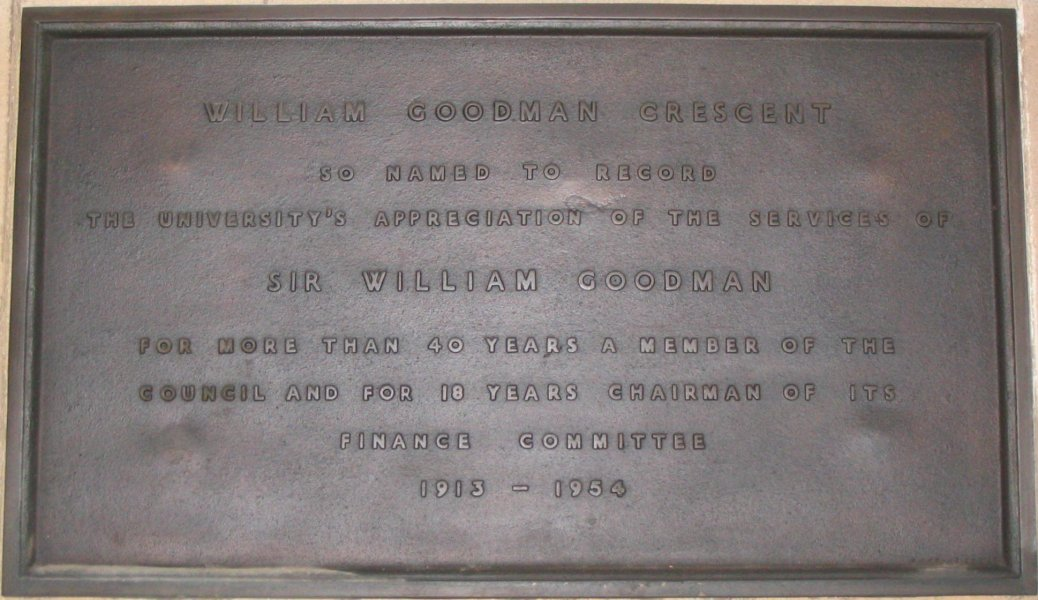
Sir William Goodman Crescent
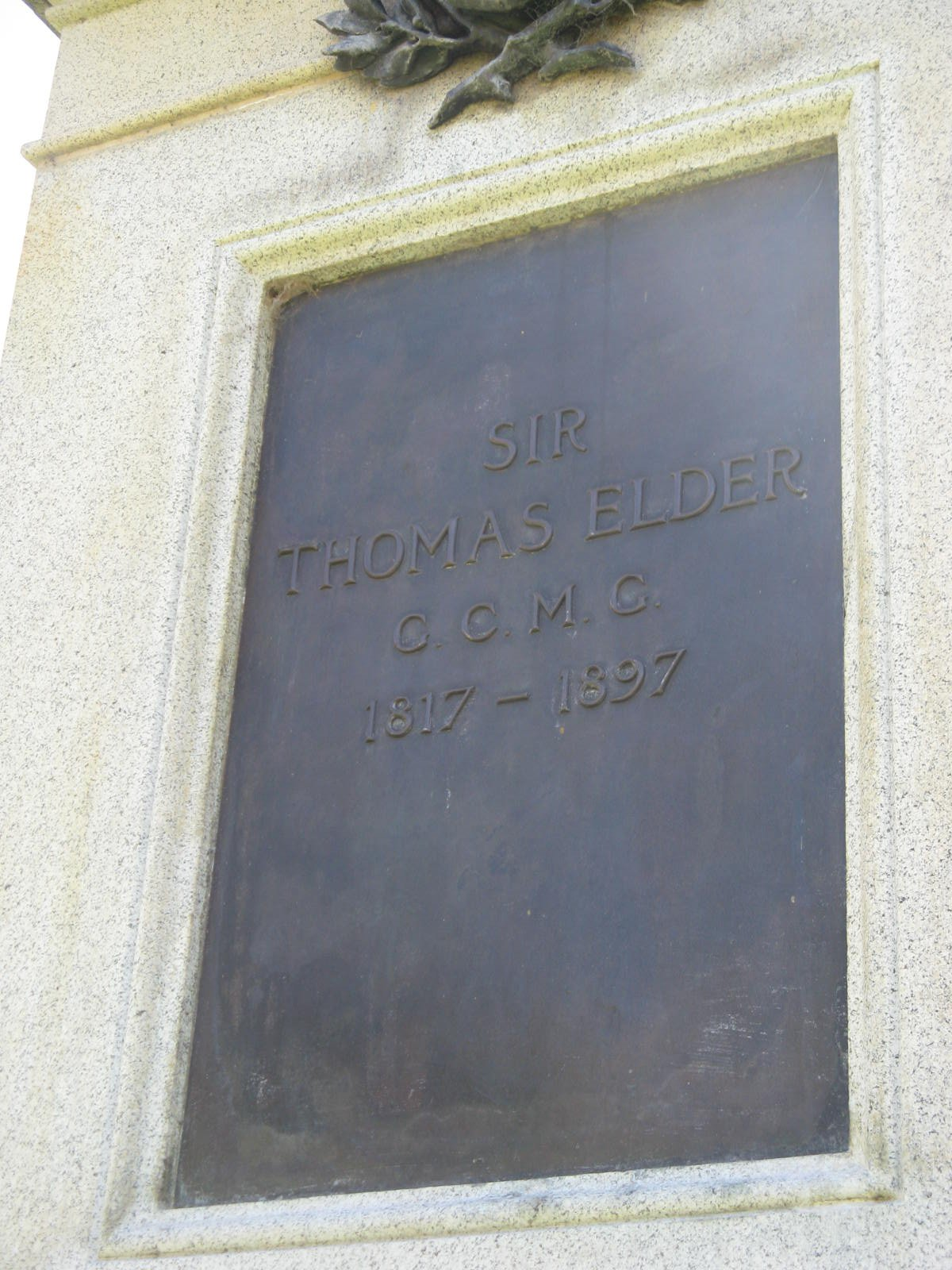
South face of the base of the statue of Sir Thomas Elder

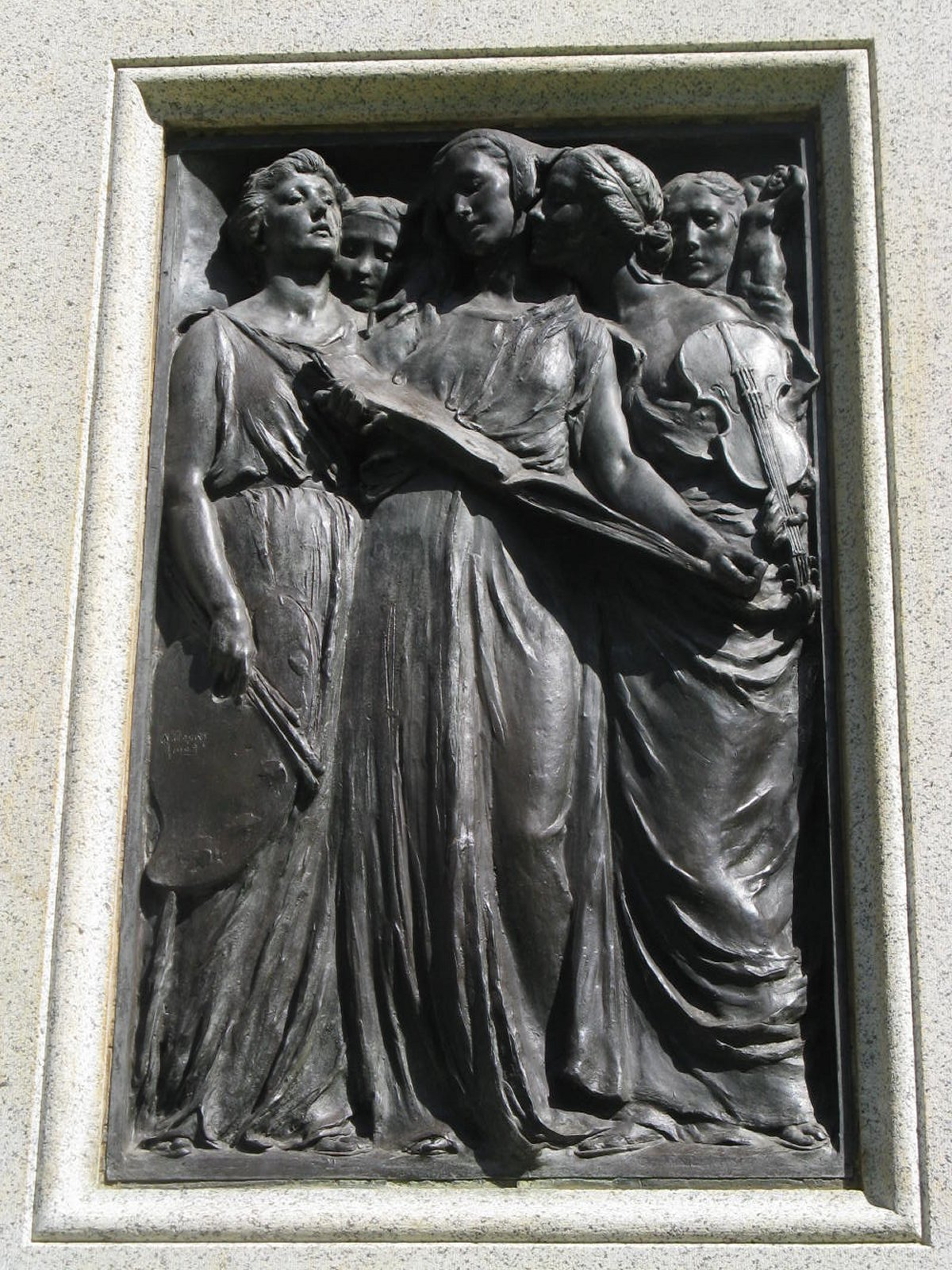
East face

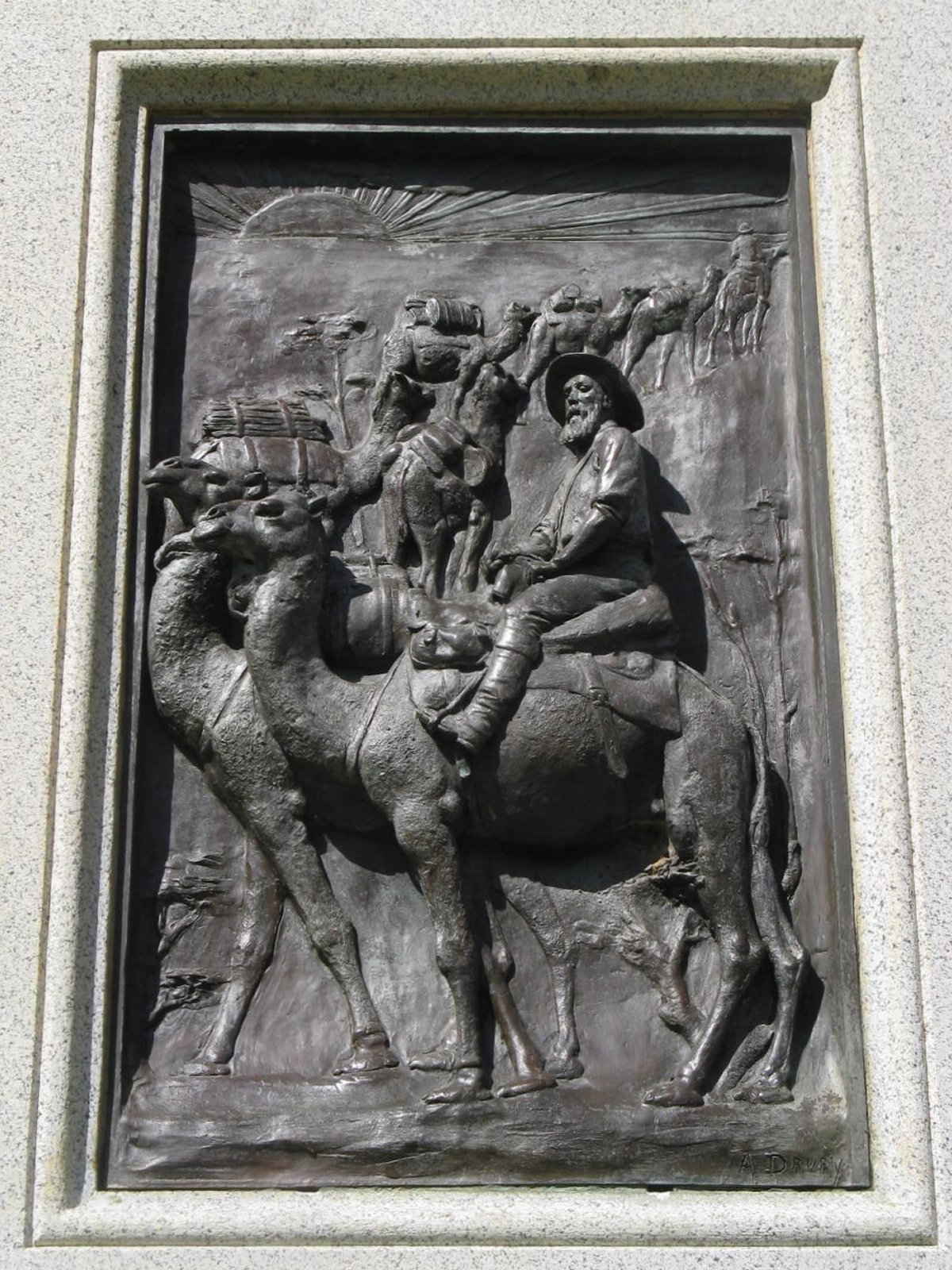
North face

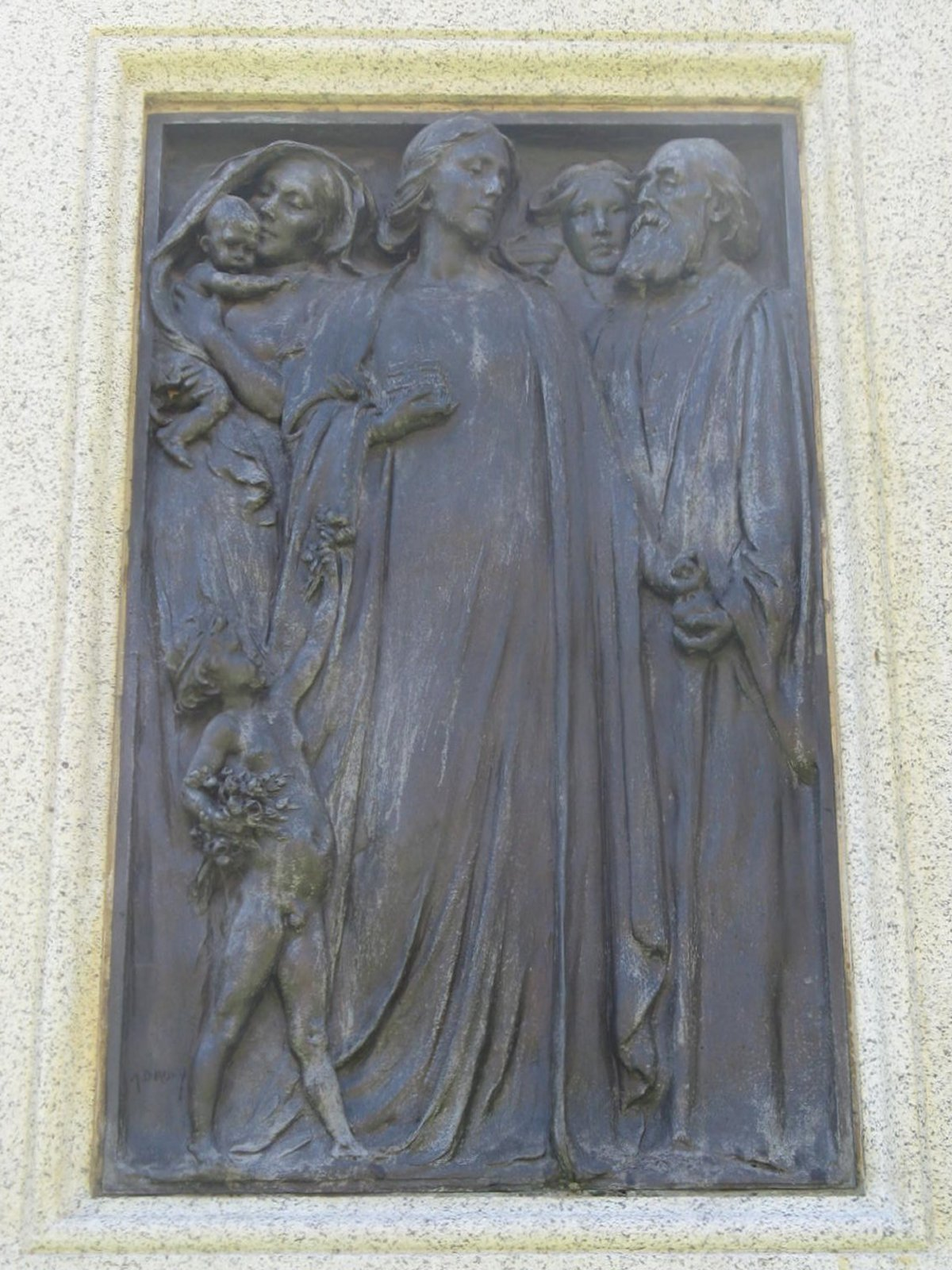
West face
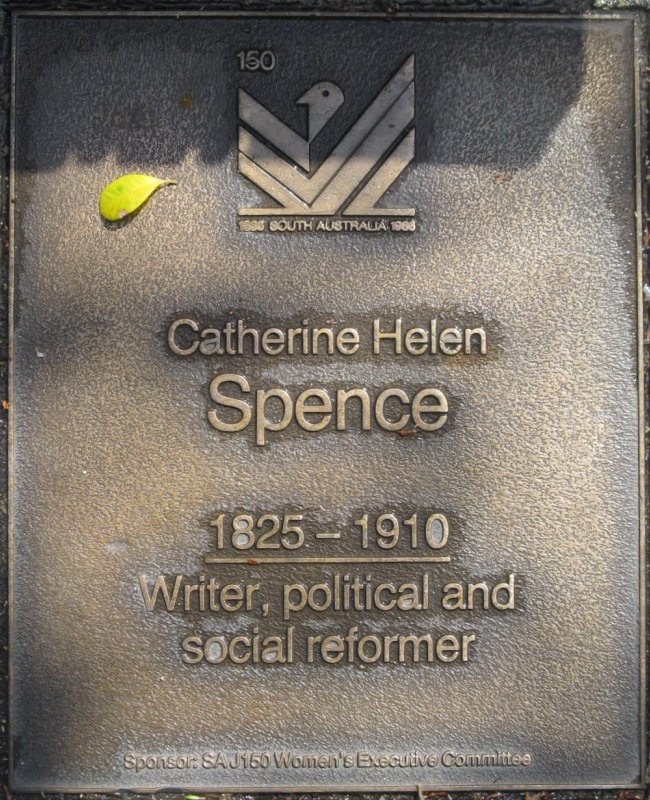
Catherine Helen Spence

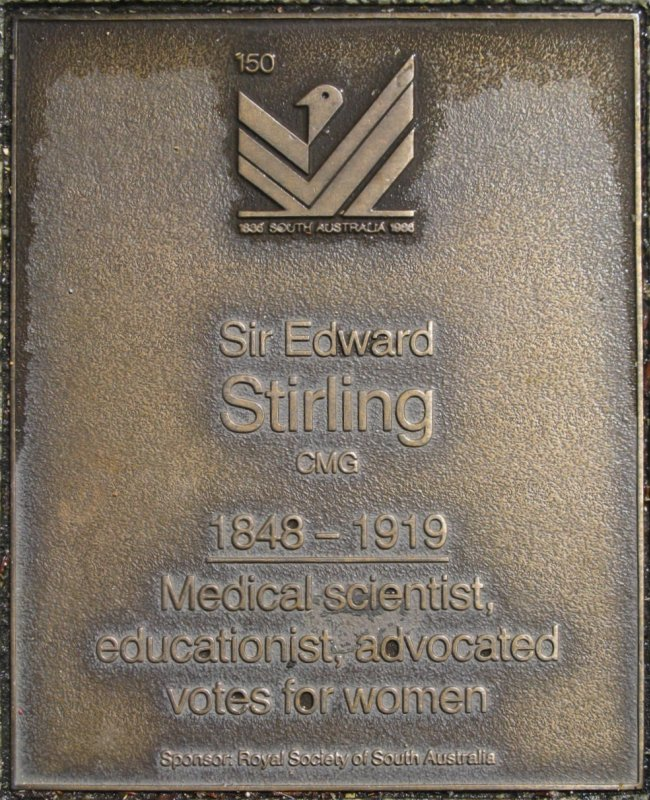
Sir Edward Stirling

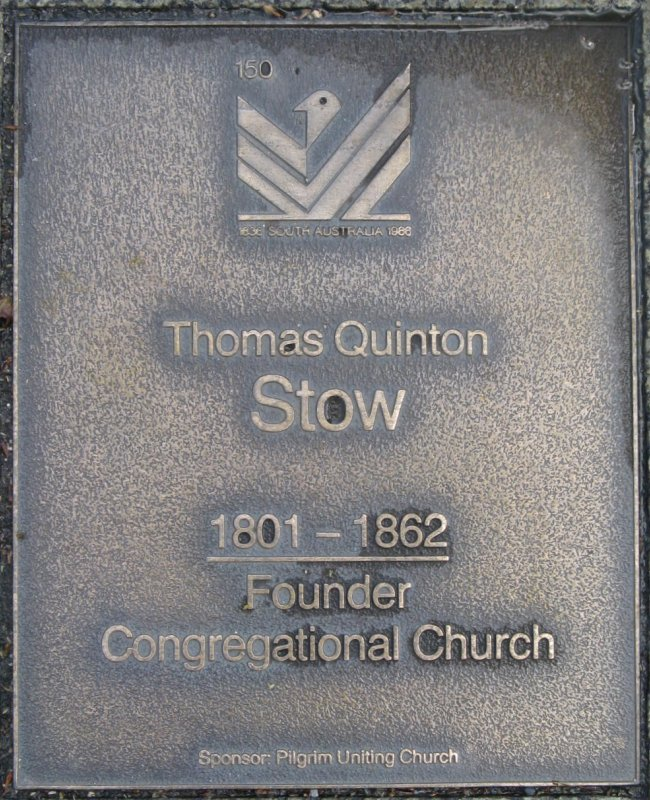
Thomas Quinton Stow

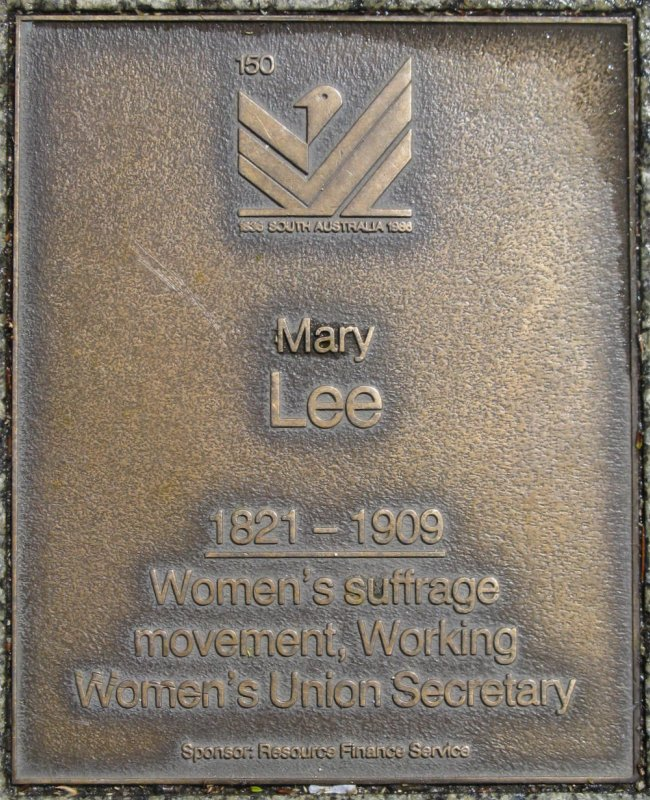
Mary Lee

=== Bonython Hall ===
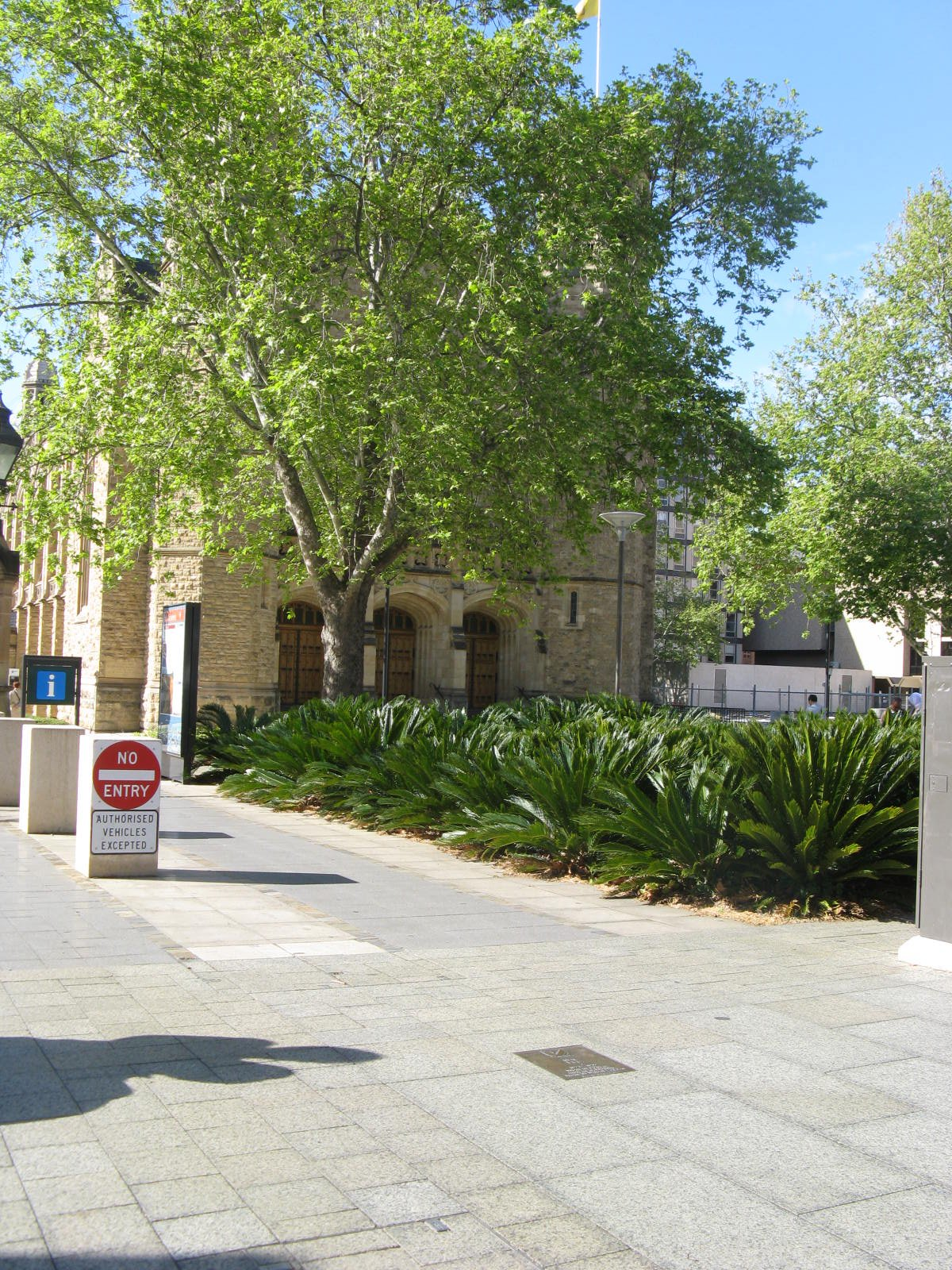

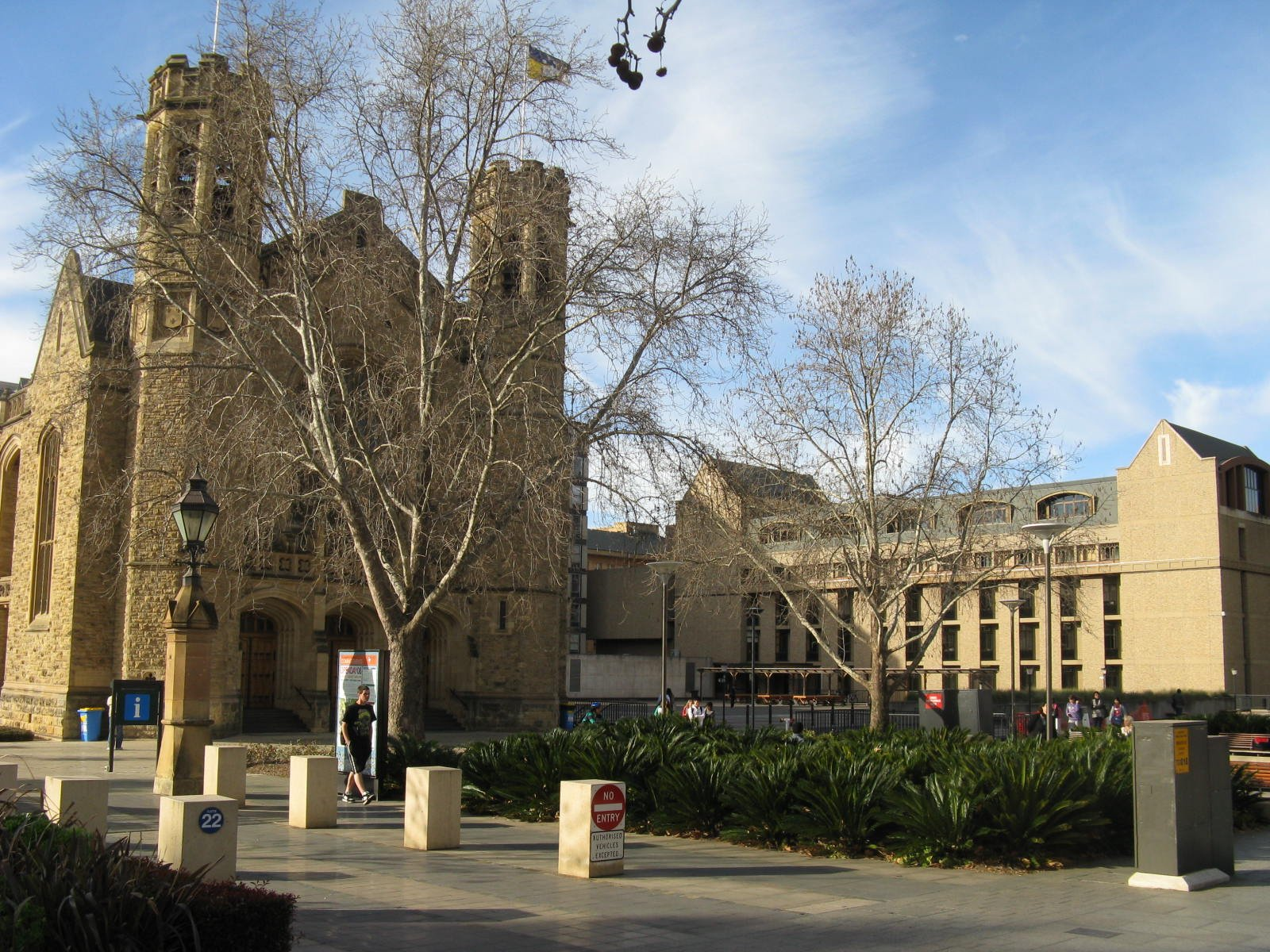

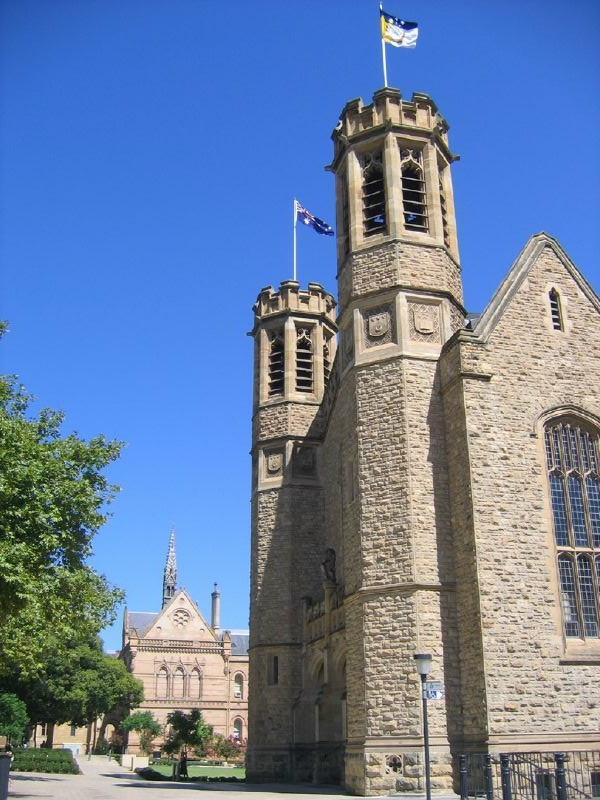

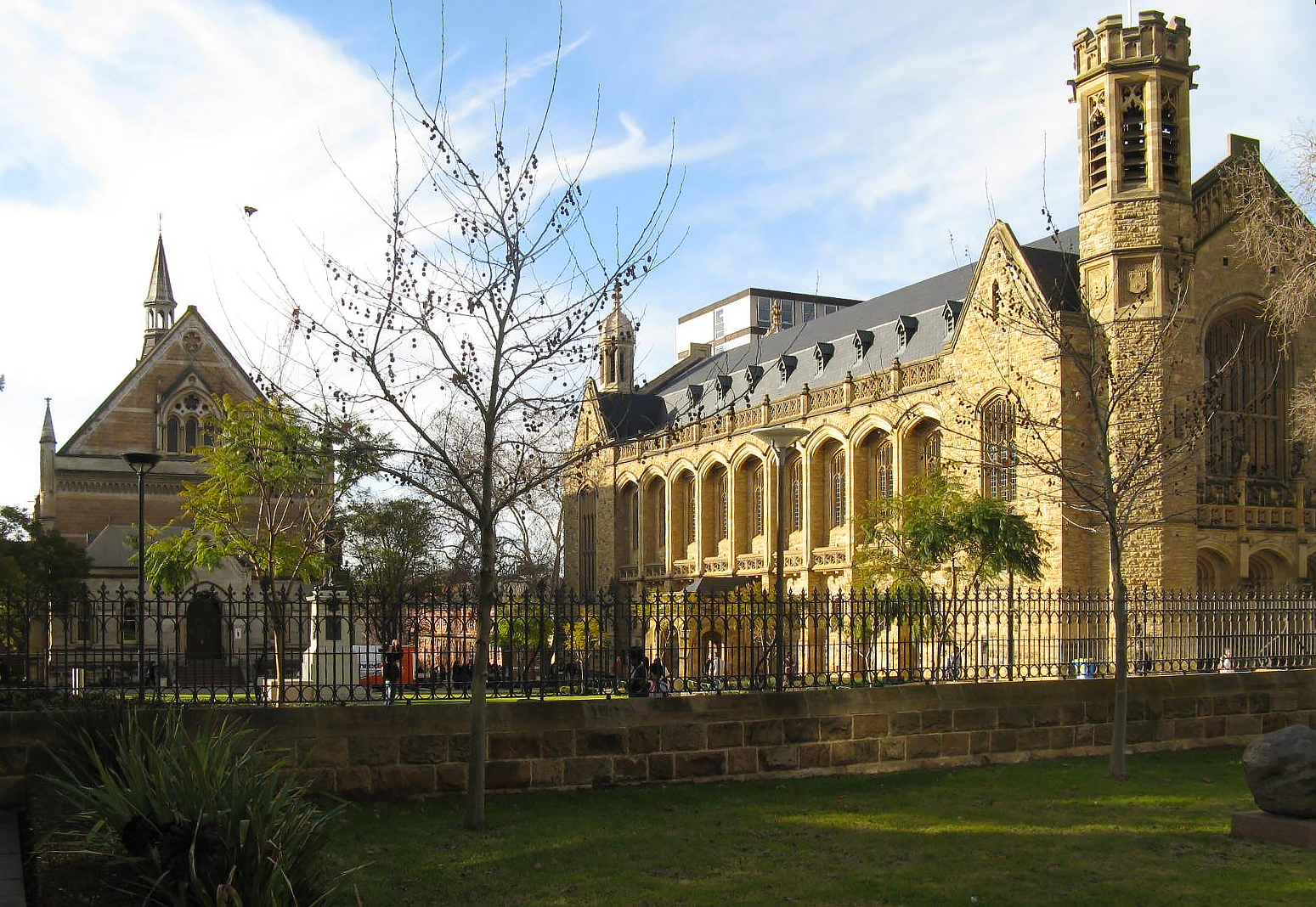

== References and notes ==
- Emily Potter, "How can you live in a city of monuments?": Reading Commemoration and Forgetting in Adelaide's North Terrace Precinct, Altitude vol 2, 2002.
- "S.A.'s greats : the men and women of the North Terrace plaques", edited by John Healey, Historical Society of South Australia, 2001. nla, UofA, UofA catalogue, Historical Society of SA. Reprinted 2002. Reprinted 2003. ISBN 0 9579430 0 8 (Note that James Park Woods VC is missing from this book.)
- "South Australian biographies, 1980", Blue Book of South Australia : Biographies Australia, 1980. nla
- "Biographical index of South Australians 1836–1885", editor: Jill Statton, South Australian Genealogy and Heraldry Society, 1986. nla
- Stewart Cockburn, "Notable lives : profiles of 21 South Australians", Ferguson Publications, 1997. nla
- Stewart Cockburn, "The patriarchs", Ferguson Publications, 1983. nla Back cover sub-title: The lives and philosophies of 30 distinguished South Australians.
- "Late picking : vintage Jubilee 150", edited by Stella Guthrie, South Australian Council on the Ageing, 1986. nla
