= 2018 Special Honours (Australia) =

The Special Honours Lists for Australia are announced by the Sovereign and Governor-General at any time.

Some honours are awarded by other countries where Queen Elizabeth II is the Head of State and Australians receiving those honours are listed here with the prevalent reference.

== Order of Australia ==
Ribbon bar of the Order of Australia (Military)

Ribbon bar of the Order of Australia (General)

=== Officer (AO) ===
Honorary – General

- Christophe Lecourtier – 18 June 2018 – For distinguished service to strengthening the Australia – France bilateral relationship.
- Ashi Tashi Dorji – 11 July 2018 – For distinguished service to Australia – Bhutan bilateral relations, particularly to the education sector.
- Édouard Philippe – 11 November 2018 – For distinguished service in support of Australia’s bilateral relations with France.

Honorary – Military

- Lieutenant General John A. Toolan, USMC – 29 January 2018 – For distinguished service to the military relationship between Australia and the United States of America by establishing the Marine Forces Rotation program, and in recognition of his efforts to enhance the Australian Defence Force amphibious capability.
- Admiral Harry B. Harris Jr., USN – 21 May 2018 – For distinguished service to the military relationship between Australia and the United States through leadership, passion and strategic foresight and in recognition of his efforts to enhance the close and longstanding defence relationship between the United States and Australia.
- Lieutenant General Perry Lim – 21 May 2018 – For distinguished service to the military relationship between Australia and Singapore through leadership, passion and strategic foresight and in recognition of his efforts to enhance the close and longstanding defence relationship between Singapore and Australia.
- General Joseph Dunford, USMC – 26 June 2018 – For distinguished service to the military relationship between Australia and the United States through leadership, passion and strategic foresight, and in recognition of his efforts to enhance the longstanding defence Alliance between Australia and the United States.
- Admiral Michael S. Rogers, USN – 17 September 2018 – For distinguished service in fostering the military relationship between Australia and the United States through exceptional leadership, passion and strategic foresight; and in recognition of his extraordinary contributions to enhancing the Australian Defence Force cyber capability.

=== Member (AM) ===
Honorary – General

- Bernard Jean Bories – 11 November 2018 – For significant service in the promotion and presentation of the Australian film industry and culture in France.
- Stéphane Jacob-Langevin – 11 November 2018 – For significant service to the promotion of Indigenous Australian art and artists.
- Yves Tate – 11 November 2018 – For significant service to Australia-France relations, particularly the commemoration of Australian soldiers who served in World War I.

=== Medal (OAM) ===
General

- Senior Constable Justin John Bateman – 24 July 2018 – For service to the international community through specialist response roles during the Tham Luang cave rescue in Thailand in 2018.
- Leading Senior Constable Kelly Craig Boers – 24 July 2018 – For service to the international community through specialist response roles during the Tham Luang cave rescue in Thailand in 2018.
- Dr Craig Challen – 24 July 2018 – For service to the international community through specialist response roles during the Tham Luang cave rescue in Thailand in 2018.
- Detective Leading Senior Constable – 24 July 2018 – For service to the international community through specialist response roles during the Tham Luang cave rescue in Thailand in 2018.
- Benjamin Walter Cox – 24 July 2018 – For service to the international community through specialist response roles during the Tham Luang cave rescue in Thailand in 2018.
- Chief Petty Officer Troy Matthew Eather – 24 July 2018 – For service to the international community through specialist response roles during the Tham Luang cave rescue in Thailand in 2018.
- First Constable Matthew Peter Fitzgerald – 24 July 2018 – For service to the international community through specialist response roles during the Tham Luang cave rescue in Thailand in 2018.
- Dr Richard Harris – 24 July 2018 – For service to the international community through specialist response roles during the Tham Luang cave rescue in Thailand in 2018.
- Acting Station Sergeant Robert Michael James – 24 July 2018 – For service to the international community through specialist response roles during the Tham Luang cave rescue in Thailand in 2018.
- Detective Leading Senior Constable Christopher John Markcrow – 24 July 2018 – For service to the international community through specialist response roles during the Tham Luang cave rescue in Thailand in 2018.

Honorary – General

- Thérèse Dheygers – 11 November 2018 – For service to Australia-France relations, particularly preserving the memory of Australian soldiers who served in World War I.
- Yves Potard – 11 November 2018 – For service to Australia-France relations, particularly preserving the memory of Australian World War 1 soldiers who fought in the Battle of Pozieres

== Royal Victorian Order ==
Ribbon bar of the Royal Victorian Order

=== Commander (CVO) ===
- Mark Thomas Fraser, LVO, OAM — Formerly Official Secretary to the Governor-General of Australia. - 28 December 2018

=== Lieutenant (LVO) ===
- Carol Buckley, MVO, OAM — Official Secretary to the Governor of Western Australia. - 28 December 2018

== Star of Courage (SC) ==
Ribbon bar of the Star of Courage

- Dr Craig Challen – 24 July 2018 – For acts of conspicuous courage in circumstances of great peril.
- Dr Richard Harris – 24 July 2018 – For acts of conspicuous courage in circumstances of great peril.

== Medal for Gallantry (MG) ==
Ribbon bar of the Medal for Gallantry

- Richard Kenneth Hawkins – 8 August 2018 – For acts of gallantry in action in hazardous circumstances as a machine gunner with 6 Platoon, B company, 2nd Battalion the Royal Australian Regiment on 15 December 1970.
- Ian Aubrey Reid – 8 August 2018 – For acts of gallantry in action in hazardous circumstances as the Platoon Medical Assistant with 7 Platoon, Charlie Company, 7th Battalion the Royal Australian Regiment during a platoon ambush near the village of Phuoc Loi in South Vietnam on 30 April 1970.

== Bravery Medal (BM) ==
Ribbon bar of the Bravery Medal

- Senior Constable Justin John Bateman – 24 July 2018 – For acts of bravery in hazardous circumstances.
- Leading Senior Constable Kelly Craig Boers – 24 July 2018 – For acts of bravery in hazardous circumstances.
- Detective Leading Senior Constable Benjamin Walter Cox – 24 July 2018 – For acts of bravery in hazardous circumstances.
- Chief Petty Officer Troy Matthew Eather – 24 July 2018 – For acts of bravery in hazardous circumstances.
- First Constable Matthew Peter Fitzgerald – 24 July 2018 – For acts of bravery in hazardous circumstances.
- Acting Station Sergeant Robert Michael James – 24 July 2018 – For acts of bravery in hazardous circumstances.
- Detective Leading Senior Constable Christopher John Markcrow – 24 July 2018 – For acts of bravery in hazardous circumstances.

== Distinguished Service Medal (DSM) ==
Ribbon bar of the Distinguished Service Medal

- Lieutenant Colonel Gregory Vivian Gilbert – 6 February 2018 – For distinguished leadership in warlike operations as Forward Observer, 12th Field Regiment attached to Delta Company, 4th Battalion, the Royal Australian Regiment, in Vietnam, on 21 September 1971.

== Australian Antarctic Medal (AAM) ==
Ribbon bar of the Australian Antarctic Medal

- Graham David Cook – 21 June 2018
- Garry Studd – 21 June 2018
- Martin Travers Tucker – 21 June 2018
- The late John Alfred Oakes – 21 June 2018

== Unit Citation for Gallantry ==
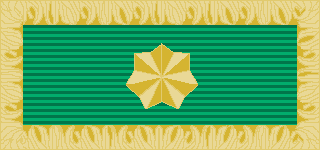
Insignia of the Unit Citation for Gallantry

- 1st Australian Task Force – 15 May 2018 – For extraordinary gallantry in action in the Dinh Duong/Bien Hoa Provinces of South Vietnam from 12 May 1968 to 6 June 1968, during Operation Thoan Thang.

== Order of St John ==
Order of St John ribbon

=== Knight of the Order of St John ===
- Brian Cantlon, MBE – 26 July 2018

=== Commander of the Order of St John ===
- Michael Connelly – 26 July 2018
- Robert Wilson – 26 July 2018

=== Officer of the Order of St John ===
- Alistair Dunn – 26 July 2018

=== Member of the Order of St John ===
- Ashely Bear – 26 July 2018
- Jack Boessler – 26 July 2018
- Anita Christini – 26 July 2018
- Dr Daniel Compton – 26 July 2018
- George Hetrel – 26 July 2018
- Patricia Hetrel – 26 July 2018
- Ryan Jacobsen – 26 July 2018
- Robyn Jones – 26 July 2018
- Claire Moore – 26 July 2018
- Fillip Pritchett – 26 July 2018
- Coling Pumpa – 26 July 2018
- Petra Reynolds – 26 July 2018
