= Richard Harris (anaesthetist) =

Australian anesthesiologist and cave diver (born 1964)

Richard Harris SC OAM
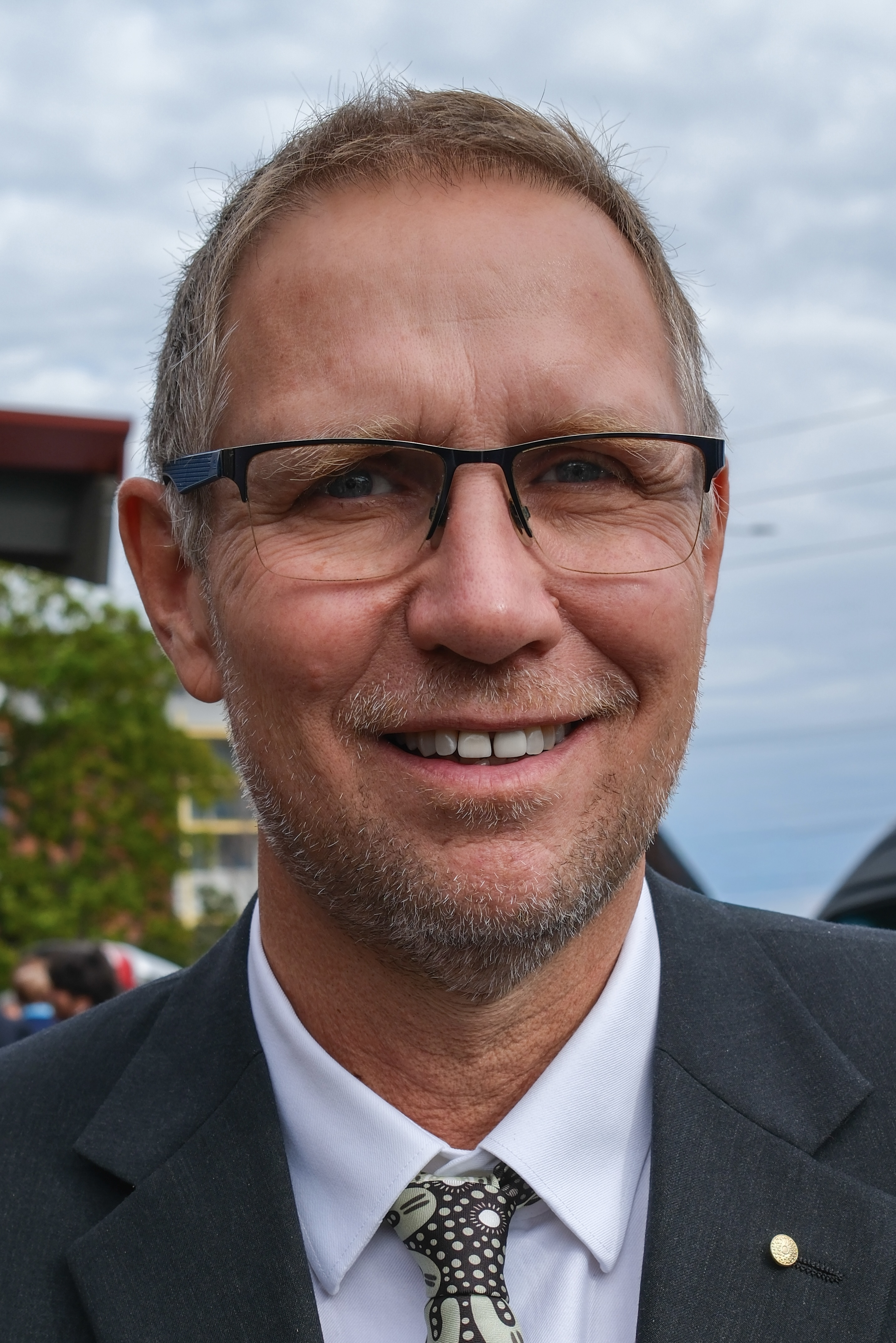
- Harris in 2026

Lieutenant Governor of South Australia
- Incumbent
- Assumed office 9 February 2024
- Monarch: Charles III
- Premier: Peter Malinauskas
- Governor: Frances Adamson; Himself (acting); Grant Stevens (designate)
- Preceded by: James Muecke

Administrator of the State of South Australia
- Incumbent
- Assumed office 21 October 2026
- Monarch: Charles III
- Premier: Peter Malinauskas
- Governor: Himself (as Administrator)
- In office 6 October 2026 – 19 October 2026
- Monarch: Charles III
- Premier: Peter Malinauskas
- Governor: Himself (as Administrator)

Personal details
- Born: Richard James Dunbar Harris; 1964 (age 61–62) Adelaide, South Australia, Australia
- Spouse: Fiona (m. 1990)
- Children: 3
- Education: St Peter's College; Flinders University (BMBS); James Cook University
- Known for: Tham Luang cave rescue

Richard James Dunbar Harris (born 1964) is an Australian cave diver and retired anaesthetist who became Lieutenant-Governor of South Australia in 2024. His participation in the Tham Luang cave rescue in 2018 earned him awards for bravery and service from Australia, and he was named Australian of the Year in 2019, along with his fellow diver, Craig Challen.

Harris was born in Adelaide to parents who were a vascular surgeon and a nurse respectively. Harris has had a passion for diving since his childhood. He went to school at St Peter's College and received his medical degree from Flinders University in 1989. During his time in university, he was a diving instructor and started cave diving in 1985. Afterwards, he undertook his training as an anaesthetist in the United Kingdom, Adelaide, and New Zealand.

While he was still practising medicine, Harris went on caving expeditions like Kija Blue in Western Australia in 2006 and Pearse Resurgence in New Zealand from 2007. He did medical aid in Vanuatu, became part of the MedSTAR retrieval team of the South Australian Ambulance Service in 2012, and contributed to the development of cave rescue training. In July 2018, his skills in medicine and diving allowed him to participate in the Tham Luang cave rescue mission. He sedated and evaluated the condition of the twelve boys and their football coach, making it possible for the divers to evacuate them in the flooded cave.

Harris stopped his practice in anaesthesia in 2022, but he continued exploring caves, writing, making films, and giving speeches. In February 2023, he dived to a depth of 230 metres (750 ft) in the Pearse Resurgence utilising hydrogen in a rebreather; this is reportedly the first of its kind ever recorded. Harris became the Lieutenant-Governor on 9 February 2024, taking over from James Muecke.

== Early life and education ==
Richard James Dunbar Harris was born in 1964 and brought up in Adelaide, South Australia. His father was a vascular surgeon who trained in hospitals in Leamington Spa and Warwick, England, and his mother was a nurse from Lancashire. His parents met when she was training in Leamington Spa and then went on to live in Australia. Harris came from a family with a history of three generations of doctors as both his paternal grandfather and great-uncle were practicing doctors in Renmark, and two of his father's uncles were rural doctors in South Australia and Victoria.

Harris was able to develop his interest in the ocean by means of boating and fishing with his father. Furthermore, he learned to snorkel and spearfish when he was still young. Harris tried scuba diving around the age of twelve and further increased his passion for scuba diving after trying hookah diving. When he was fifteen, he went to take his scuba diving classes with Ron Allum of Adelaide Skin Diving Centre which was run by David Birchall. Harris graduated from St Peter's College, Adelaide, in 1981.

After evaluating marine biology and veterinary medicine as options, Harris decided to pursue medicine. He enrolled at Flinders University at the age of 17, receiving news of admission while working at a station near Broken Hill. Despite failing in his first year, he managed to complete the course and obtained the Bachelor of Medicine, Bachelor of Surgery (BMBS) degree in 1989. His original plan was to be a general practitioner in the remote areas.

At the university, Harris became a diving instructor of the Flinders University Underwater Club and participated in teaching diving programs. He started cave diving in 1985 and his first cave dive took place in a sinkhole in southeast South Australia. Later on, he received postgraduate education in aeromedical retrieval from James Cook University.

== Medical career ==
Between 1991 and 1992, Harris practiced as a senior house officer in anaesthesia and intensive care at the Warwick Hospital in England. He has trained in Britain, Adelaide and New Zealand before becoming part of Specialist Anaesthetic Services in 1998. The clinical fields of interest that Harris has were anaesthesia for breast and endocrine surgery, ear, nose and throat surgery, acoustic neuroma surgery, upper gastrointestinal surgery and endoscopy.

Intensive care, diving and hyperbaric medicine, as well as aeromedical retrieval were also fields that Harris was involved in. In 2004, he started practicing privately as an anaesthetist in Adelaide, as well as a consultant in diving and hyperbaric medicine at the Royal Adelaide Hospital.

Thereafter, Harris did a two-year AusAid placement at Vila Central Hospital, Port Vila, Vanuatu, that ended in January 2006. This included working in anaesthesiology and intensive care. Additionally, he volunteered as a diving medical consultant, seeing five divers in 15 treatments in a hyperbaric chamber run by Promedical paramedics at Port Vila. The two patients who suffered from serious spinal decompression sickness fully recovered.

In addition to his hospital work in Vanuatu, Harris gave advice to the local scuba operators on fitness to dive and treated diving and swimming injuries, bites and stings from marine animals, fish poisonings and drownings. He left Vanuatu for Australia in January 2006 to start working in anaesthesia again. He also served in medical assistance teams in the case of natural disasters in the Pacific.

Harris was appointed as an aeromedical consultant in SA Ambulance Service MedSTAR from 2012 to take care of critically ill patients. In 2016, he took up the position of retrieval coordination from Bill Griggs. He was also a medical lead for the South Australian Urban Search and Rescue Task Force. In 2022, Harris stopped practising as an anaesthetist.

In December 2018, Harris led the MedSTAR medical retrieval coordination team.

== Diving career ==
Harris has dived in waters in countries like Australia, China, Christmas Island and New Zealand. His diving experience has seen him serve as a diver, cameraman and doctor for National Geographic and films. He is also a member of the Explorers Club. While visiting Espiritu Santo, Vanuatu, he carried out two dives to clean and take pictures of the name on the back of the SS President Coolidge wreck at a depth of 65 metres (213 ft).

Harris and Challen diving together

In 2001, David Doolette was the supervisor of Harris's research for a Diploma in Diving Medicine. Harris manufactured his own rebreather in 2002 before buying a commercial one. Craig Challen was his primary dive partner from 2006.

=== Cave exploration and recovery ===
In June 2005, Harris made contact with Paul Hosie about participation in an expedition to Kija Blue, a remote flooded cave in the Kimberley area of Western Australia. He contributed to the planning process and logistics for the next year and became part of the six-man expedition in 2006. The expedition was led by Hosie and also included Challen and three others. Harris took part in dives for deep exploration in KISS Closed Circuit Rebreather configuration.

In 2007, Harris became part of the expedition to the Pearse Resurgence, a flooded cave system located near Nelson, New Zealand. Other expedition members were David Apperley, Craig Howell and British cave diver Rick Stanton, who Harris met at that expedition. In 2008, Harris achieved a depth of 182 metres.

Harris joined an expedition to the Pearse Resurgence that was undertaken by Australians in early 2011, where the research received partial funding by National Geographic. The expedition stayed in the isolated area for nearly three weeks, using a helicopter to transport five tonnes of equipment there. Underwater shelters placed at four depths enabled divers to take breaks and be protected from cold water at decompression stops. Challen dived to 194 metres and the fauna of caves was studied, including some unidentified amphipods. Harris wrote and filmed a report on the expedition for National Geographic. The following expedition explored the waters up to 221 metres in 2012.

In 2011, Harris helped police to recover the body of his friend, Agnes Milowka, a cave diver, who died in Tank Cave near Mount Gambier, South Australia.

Harris created a Sump Rescue Orientation Program, that was held at Mount Gambier first. In April 2015, Harris helped organise a two-day program at Jenolan Caves, the expedition report noted that this was the first training for cave-diver rescues in New South Wales. This was a collaboration between the NSW Cave Rescue Squad, Sydney University Speleological Society, and the Australian Cave Rescue Commission. At that time, Harris was the search and rescue officer for the Cave Divers Association of Australia (CDAA).

=== Tham Luang cave rescue ===
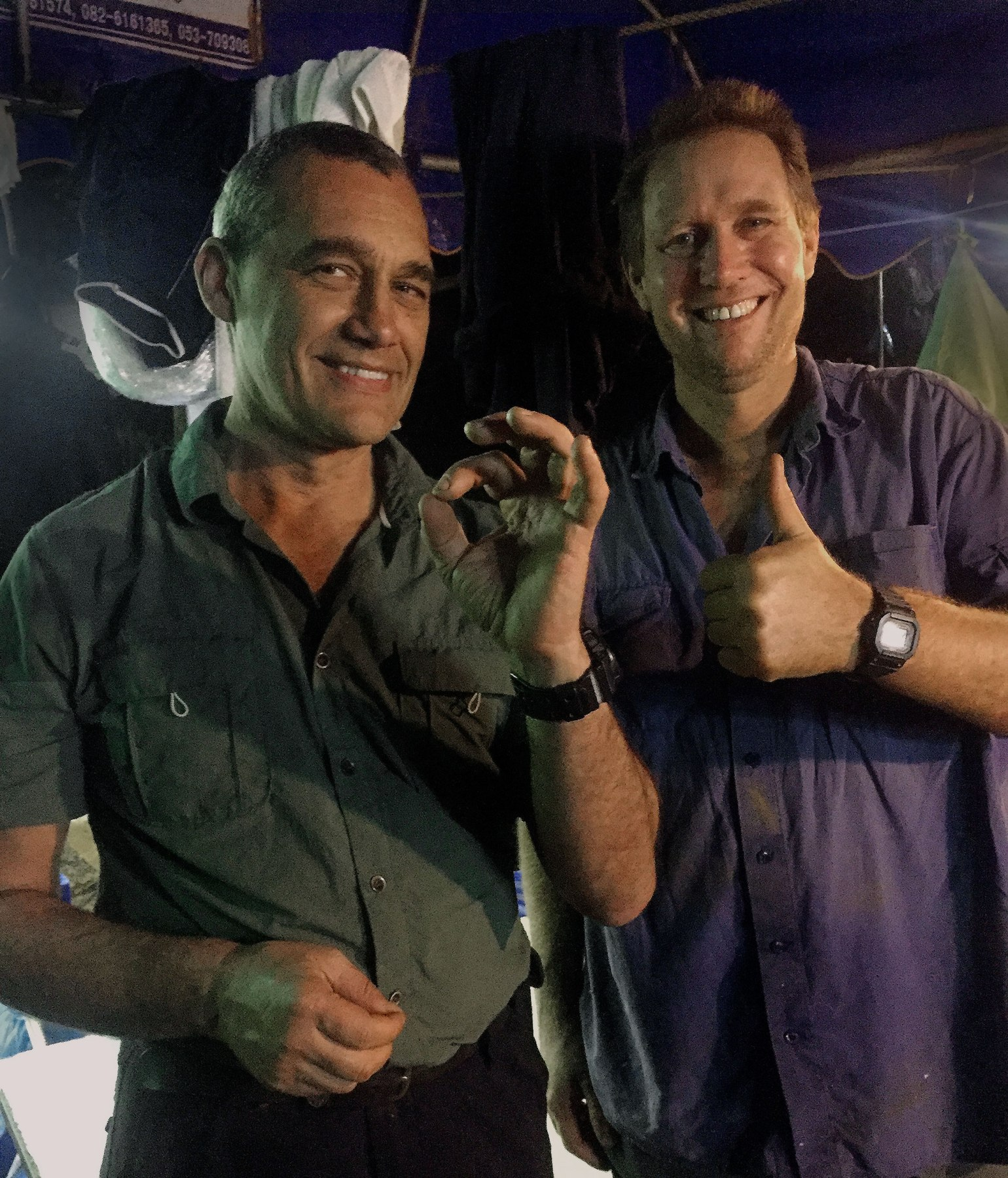
Challen and Harris following the Tham Luang cave rescue, 11 July 2018

In July 2018, Harris became part of the worldwide operation to rescue the trapped 12 boys and their football coach from the flooded Tham Luang cave in Thailand, who had been trapped there since 23 June. His assistance was sought by Stanton on account of his dual knowledge of anaesthesiology and cave diving. Harris decided to forego his scheduled diving vacation on the Nullarbor Plain after receiving a call on 5 July and flew to Thailand.

Initially, Harris was against the plan to anaesthetise the boys before taking them out of the cave. Prior to travelling, he had a discussion regarding ketamine with Challen, the veterinarian who was knowledgeable about this drug, as well as his colleague James Doube regarding its usage in challenging circumstances.

After obtaining permission to practise medicine in Thailand, Harris made his way into the cave and made an assessment of the trapped people. They were healthy, except being hungry and cold, but not having chest infections yet. Upon discussion with the rescue team and an Australian retrieval expert, he decided that anaesthesia would provide the most realistic option for moving them out. He devised a method using ketamine which allowed accompanying divers to inject the patients multiple times through the process of movement. Challen stayed past the first section of flooding water in order to examine the children and help take care of them.

Each evacuee was anaesthetised before leaving and tested for the fit of diving masks and breathing. Four boys were evacuated on the first day, another four on the second day, and the remaining four boys together with the coach on the third day. While reports initially mentioned Harris helped in determining the evacuation order, coach Ekapol Chanthawong later stated that Harris's examination revealed no medical reason to move anyone first. Chanthawong says that boys living the furthest away from the exit were chosen to be evacuated first.

Finally, on the last day, Harris supported a disoriented diver during his dive with a kid and successfully guided him to safety through the last flooded chamber. According to Harris, he worried all along the mission about drowning, airway obstruction, hypothermia, and flooding.

The next day, Harris and Challen paid the rescued people a visit at Chiangrai Prachanukroh Hospital. On 11 July, Harris called the Australian prime minister, Malcolm Turnbull, via Skype to congratulate both the kids and the Thai Navy SEALs who stayed with them.

=== Later diving activities ===
Harris posing with his diving gear

Harris and Challen continued their recreational diving activities with the help of their mates in the Tank Cave in August 2018. In November, Harris assisted in conducting CDAA's Sump Rescue Course in the Pines Cave, located in Millicent, South Australia. It was related to evaluating and extracting an injured person from a cave system.

The members of the Wetmules exploration group, including Harris, reached a depth of 245 metres at Pearse Resurgence in 2020. From May 2021, Harris started collaborating with experts in the field of diving medicine, physiology, decompression and diving equipment engineering, and researching the use of hydrogen as a breathing mixture for diving.

The duo made a thirteen-hour dive to 230 meters deep at Pearse Resurgence on 14 February 2023. While Harris was using a hydrogen-rich mixture of gas for his rebreather, Challen was using trimix. This account referred to Harris' dive as the first recorded dive of a rebreather using hydrogen. Harris said that he did not experience any hand tremors during the dive as he had been experiencing when diving to great depths earlier, but no difference was observed by him with respect to breathing resistance.

In 2024, Harris was identified as Australian regional coordinator for International Underwater Cave Rescue and Recovery. At the end of 2025, Harris was involved in the retrieval of the remains of 65 year old Victorian diver, who had died at Tank Cave, near Tantanoola on 30 November. It was done by specialist divers of CDAA with help from South Australia Police Water Operations Unit.

== Lieutenant-Governor of South Australia ==
Harris at his swearing-in at Government House, along with his wife Fiona (left) and daughter Millie (right) in February 2024

On 25 January 2024, Governor Frances Adamson appointed Harris as Lieutenant-Governor of South Australia with the help of the Executive Council from 9 February 2024. Harris replaced James Muecke, who vacated his commission when Harris was sworn in. Harris was glad to have received such an appointment and vowed to do his best for South Australia.

Harris took up office as Deputy Governor between 16 and 18 April 2026 through an appointment by Adamson made known in a Department of the Premier and Cabinet statement on 9 April.

Harris met with Adamson at Government House on 6 October 2026 to take up his post as the Administrator of South Australia. This position held by Harris before the appointment of Grant Stevens as governor on 9 December 2026.

== Personal life ==
Harris married Fiona, whom he met while studying medicine in the early days, in 1990. They have three kids, two boys and a girl.

The father of Harris died on 11 July 2018, just after the successful conclusion of the Tham Luang cave rescue mission. One of his MedSTAR colleagues, Andrew Pearce, asked for privacy for the family because of both the rescue mission and grief.

In 2024, the activities of Harris include public speaking, factual filmmaking, underwater photography, writing children's books, cave diving, and motorsports using his Mini and Ford Escort.

== Honours and awards ==
Harris speaking at the Bob Hawke Prime Ministerial Centre on 27 July 2023.

Harris was appointed as a Fellow of the Australian and New Zealand College of Anaesthetists (ANZCA) on 25 July 1998. Harris won the OzTek Outstanding Achievement Award in 2009 due to his efforts in exploring caves and was also named the Technical Diver of the Year of Australasia in 2017.

On 24 July 2018, Governor-General Peter Cosgrove awarded the Star of Courage (SC) to Harris and Challen for their exceptional bravery shown in the Tham Luang cave rescue. Harris, along with Challen, also won the Medal of the Order of Australia (OAM) due to their service to the international community in the capacity of specialist response. Harris was later appointed as a Knight Grand Cross (First Class) of the Most Admirable Order of the Direkgunabhorn by King Maha Vajiralongkorn of Thailand. Harris also won the PADI Medal of Valor as a part of the rescue team and the Pask Award of the Association of Anaesthetists in 2018.

In 2019, Harris won the Australian of the Year Award for South Australia and jointly won the Australian of the Year Award with Challen. In that same year, Harris received the ANZCA Medal and an honorary degree from Flinders University in appreciation of his expertise in medicine and rescue.

St Peter's College announced Harris as the Rex J Lipman Fellow on 8 March 2019. He gave a talk with the title "Decision Making in the Dark" on 4 April. On 25 May 2019, Harris was awarded the Gold Medal by the Australian Medical Association at their annual conference in Brisbane.

In 2021, Harris was conferred an honorary Doctor of Medicine from James Cook University. Harris was also bestowed the Explorers Club Presidential Award on 13 July 2022 when its Australia-New Zealand branch convened in Sydney for his involvement in the Thai cave rescue. Moreover, in 2022, Harris was chosen to give the Nisbet Oration at the annual scientific meeting of the Royal Australian and New Zealand College of Radiologists.

== In popular culture ==
Harris has made an appearance as himself in The Rescue (2021), a documentary on the Tham Luang cave rescue, produced by National Geographic, and directed by Elizabeth Chai Vasarhelyi and Jimmy Chin. He has been played by Rodger Corser in Thai Cave Rescue (2022), a limited series on Netflix, and by Joel Edgerton in Thirteen Lives (2022). Harris was featured in the documentary Deeper by Jennifer Peedom in October 2025.

== Selected bibliography ==
=== Books ===
- Challen, Craig; Harris, Richard (2019). Against All Odds: The Inside Account of the Thai Cave Rescue and the Courageous Australians at the Heart of It. With Ellis Henican. Penguin Random House Australia. ISBN 9781760890957.
- Harris, Richard (12 April 2022). Alfie the Brave. Illustrated by Simon Howe. Puffin Books. ISBN 9781761041358.
- Challen, Craig; Harris, Richard (2 August 2022). Against All Odds: Young Readers' Edition. Puffin Books. ISBN 9780143778202.
- Harris, Richard (5 July 2023). The Art of Risk: What We Can Learn from the World's Leading Risk-Takers. Scribner Australia. ISBN 9781761106774.
- Harris, Richard (6 February 2024). Alfie the Kind. Illustrated by Simon Howe. Puffin Books. ISBN 9781761341328.

=== Medical papers ===
- Harris, R. J. D.; Doolette, D. J.; Wilkinson, D. C.; Williams, D. J. (2003). "Measurement of fatigue following 18 msw dry chamber dives breathing air or enriched air nitrox". Undersea & Hyperbaric Medicine. 30 (4): 285–291. PMID 14756231.
- Harris, Richard (March 2006). "Tales from the South Pacific – diving medicine in Vanuatu" (PDF). Diving and Hyperbaric Medicine. 36 (1): 22–23.
- Harris, Richard (December 2009). "Genitourinary infection and barotrauma as complications of 'P-valve' use in drysuit divers". Diving and Hyperbaric Medicine. 39 (4): 210–212. PMID 22752741.
- Lippmann, J.; Walker, D.; Lawrence, C.; Fock, A.; Wodak, T.; Harris, R.; Jamieson, S. (March 2013). "Provisional report on diving-related fatalities in Australian waters 2008". Diving and Hyperbaric Medicine. 43 (1): 16–34. PMID 23508659.
- Fock, A.; Harris, R.; Slade, M. (June 2013). "Oxygen exposure and toxicity in recreational technical divers". Diving and Hyperbaric Medicine. 43 (2): 67–71. PMID 23813459.
- Harris, R. J. D.; Frawley, G.; Devaney, B. C.; Frawley, G.; Fock, A.; Jones, A. B. (September 2015). "A 10-year estimate of the incidence of decompression illness in a discrete group of recreational cave divers in Australia". Diving and Hyperbaric Medicine. 45 (3): 147–153. PMID 26415066.
- Lippmann, J.; Lawrence, C.; Fock, A.; Wodak, T.; Jamieson, S.; Harris, R.; Walker, D. (September 2015). "Provisional report on diving-related fatalities in Australian waters 2010". Diving and Hyperbaric Medicine. 45 (3): 154–175. PMID 26415067.
- Lippmann, J.; Lawrence, C.; Fock, A.; Jamieson, S.; Harris, R. (December 2016). "Provisional report on diving-related fatalities in Australian waters in 2011". Diving and Hyperbaric Medicine. 46 (4): 207–240. PMID 27966202.
- Lawthaweesawat, C.; Harris, R.; Isara, W.; Pongpirul, K. (4 April 2019). "Prehospital Care of the 13 Hypothermic, Anesthetized Patients in the Thailand Cave Rescue". New England Journal of Medicine. 380 (14): 1372–1373. doi:10.1056/NEJMc1900831. PMID 30943344.
- van Waart, H.; Harris, R. J.; Gant, N.; Vrijdag, X. C. E.; Challen, C. J.; Lawthaweesawat, C.; Mitchell, S. J. (June 2020). "Deep anaesthesia: The Thailand cave rescue and its implications for management of the unconscious diver underwater". Diving and Hyperbaric Medicine. 50 (2): 121–129. doi:10.28920/dhm50.2.121-129. PMC 7481118. PMID 32557413.
- Harris, R. J.; Challen, C. J.; Mitchell, S. J. (31 March 2024). "The first deep rebreather dive using hydrogen: case report". Diving and Hyperbaric Medicine. 54 (1): 69–72. doi:10.28920/dhm54.1.65-68. PMC 11065502. PMID 38507913.
- Scott, T. K. M.; Vrijdag, X. C. E.; van Waart, H.; Harris, R. J.; Trubridge, W.; Tillmans, F.; Mitchell, S. J. (1 July 2026). "Arterial blood gas changes in progressively deeper breath-hold dives". Journal of Applied Physiology. 141 (1): 180–189. doi:10.1152/japplphysiol.00324.2026. PMID 42295135.

== See also ==
- Edd Sorenson — American cave diver and technical diving instructor.
- John Volanthen — British cave diver and rescue specialist.
