= S. J. Jacobs =

Australian lawyer and businessman (1853–1937)

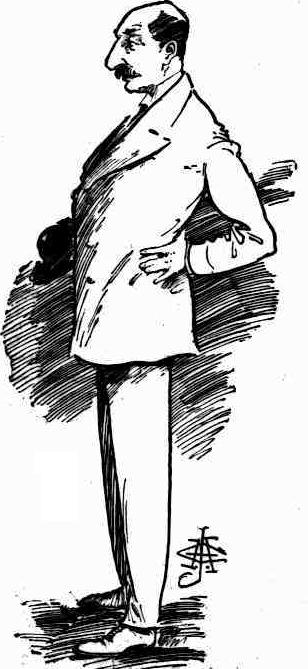
- S. J. Jacobs (1853–1937)
- Born: 28 March 1853
- Died: 4 January 1937 (aged 83)
- Occupations: Lawyer, businessman and sportsman

Samuel Joshua Jacobs (28 March 1853 – 4 January 1937), generally known as S. J. Jacobs, was a South Australian lawyer, businessman and sportsman, remembered as the longtime managing director of the South Australian Brewing Company.

== History ==
S. J. Jacobs was born in Adelaide to Elizabeth and Charles Jacobs, founder of Charles Jacobs & Son, Adelaide merchants.

He was educated at J. L. Young's Adelaide Educational Institution and Geelong College under Dr. George Morrison. He studied law at Melbourne University and in 1876 was admitted as an attorney and solicitor in Victoria and South Australia. He served his articles with the Queen Street, Melbourne law firm of Malleson, England, and Stewart, then from 1878 to 1884 practised in partnership with W. F Stock as Stock & Jacobs of Temple Chambers, Currie Street, Adelaide.

In 1884 he was admitted as a partner in his father's business as Charles Jacobs & Sons, which had lately specialised in importing sugar from Mauritius, and for whom his strong legal background was a decided advantage. He became head of the firm and head of the Adelaide Chamber of Commerce. He was also a welcome addition to other boards, notably the S.A. Brewing Company from 1888 and Timor Development Company, a coffee producer. He was also a local director of the Sun Fire Office, and the Great Boulder Proprietary gold mining company. He was managing director of Castle Salt from its foundation in 1890 until its liquidation in January 1931, and became M.D. of the Australian Salt Company which took over its assets. He was chairman of directors of S.A. Brewing in 1902 and some time before 1912 appointed managing director.

== Other interests ==
- He succeeded James Gartrell as president of the SA Chamber of Commerce in March 1901, and was
- A prominent member of S.A. Tattersalls Club, and chairman from 1899, however he severed all connections in July 1930 when his son R. E. Jacobs was blackballed from the committee.
- President of the Associated Chamber of Commerce for South Australia
- Member of the council of the Adelaide University, and chairman of its finance committee.
- Vice-president the university's Board of Commercial Studies.
- President of the Amateur Billiards Association
- Chairman, S.P.C.A.
- Member of the advisory council of the Travellers' Aid Society, Adelaide
- Chairman of the commercial section of the State Advisory Council
- A member of the committee of the S.A. Jockey Club from around 1900
- Member of the Commercial Travellers' Association, Naval and Military Club, and the Stock Exchange Club.
- President of the S.A. Bowling Association from 1906 to 1927.

== Family ==
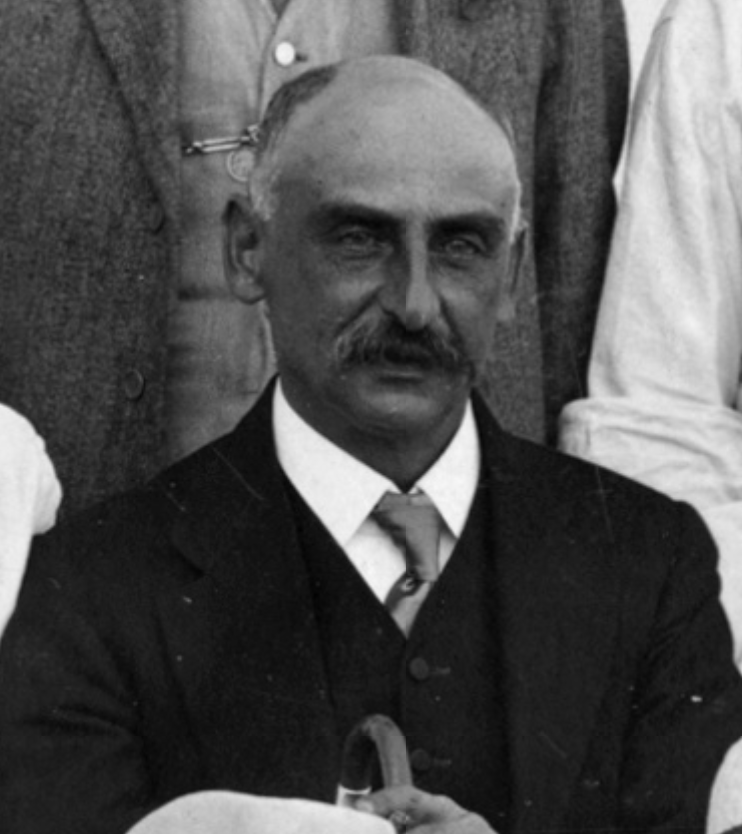
Samuel Joshua Jacobs circa. 1918

Samuel Joshua Jacobs, son of Charles and Elizabeth Jacobs, married Caroline Ellis on 3 December 1878. She was a daughter of Louis Ellis, sheriff of Central Bailiwick, Melbourne and I. Jacobs. Their children included:

Four daughters married four brothers, sons of Isaac Jacobs (1835–1914) and his wife Daisy Jacobs, a sister of Sir Isaac Isaacs.
(S. J. Jacobs and Isaac Jacobs ( – 10 October 1914) were not related.)

- Elizabeth Ellis Jacobs (1881– ) married Louis Philip Jacobs on 18 February 1904, lived in London
- Lydia Emily "Gipsy" Jacobs ( – ) married Elliot Ralph Jacobs on 30 July 1902, lived in London
- Dorothea Jacobs (1883– ) married Emanuel Julien Jacobs on 31 August 1904, lived in London
- Agnes Lilian Jacobs (1885 – ) married Philip Acland Jacobs on 30 June 1908; he was barrister and poultry farmer of Melbourne
- Roland Ellis Jacobs (28 February 1891 – 28 June 1981) married Olga Hertzberg ( – 1969) on 29 August 1917. He married again, to Esther Cook MBE, née Solomon, later Lipman on 30 November 1970. She was a daughter of Vaiben Louis Solomon and Adelaide's first woman councillor. He was businessman of Thornber Street, Unley Park

They lived at "Lyndhurst", South Terrace, Adelaide around 1904, then "Brackendene", 5 Maturin Road, Glenelg.
