= Grant Stevens (police officer) =

Australian police officer (born 1964)

Grant Stevens APM
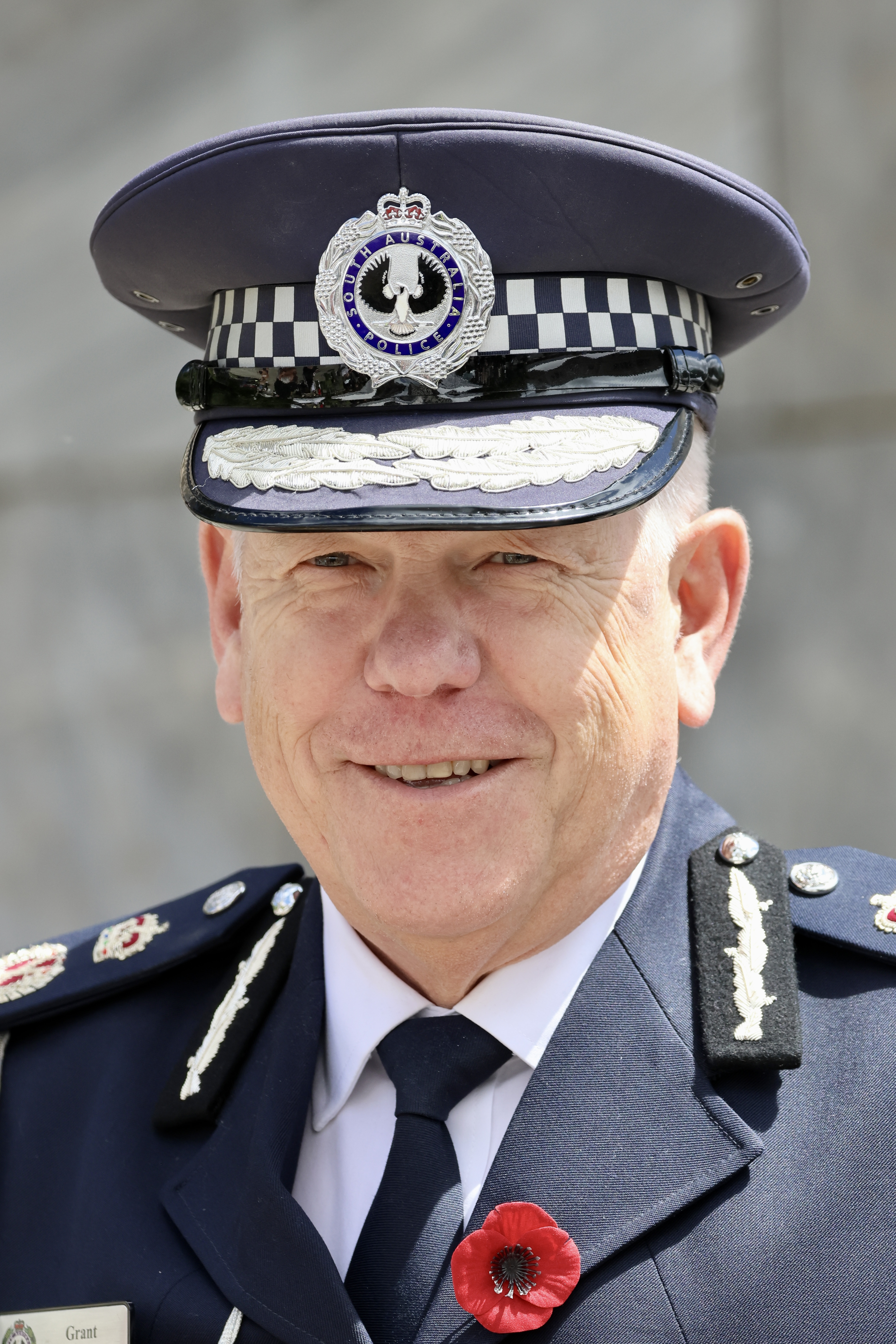
- Stevens in 2025

37th Governor of South Australia
- Designate
- Assuming office 9 December 2026
- Monarch: Charles III
- Premier: Peter Malinauskas
- Lieutenant Governor: Richard Harris
- Succeeding: Frances Adamson; Richard Harris (acting)

22nd Commissioner of South Australia Police
- In office 21 July 2015 – 23 October 2026
- Deputy: Linda Williams
- Preceded by: Gary Burns
- Succeeded by: Linda Williams (acting)

Personal details
- Born: Grantley John Stevens; 1964 (age 61–62) Adelaide, South Australia, Australia
- Spouse: Emma
- Children: 5
- Education: Banksia Park High School; University of South Australia (BBus)
- Occupation: Police officer

Grantley John Stevens (born 1964) is an Australian police officer who is the designated governor of South Australia, with his swearing-in scheduled for 9 December 2026. He previously served as Commissioner of South Australia Police (SAPOL) from 2015 to 2026.

He was born in Adelaide and went to Banksia Park High School. He entered SAPOL as a cadet in 1982. While serving in the police force, Stevens furthered his education through the University of South Australia and graduated with a Bachelor of Business in Human Resource Development in 1999 and a Graduate Certificate in Management in 2004. He founded SAPOL's Paedophile Task Force in 2003 and served as an advisor to Justice Ted Mullighan in the Children in State Care Commission of Inquiry.

Later, he served as assistant commissioner for crime and deputy commissioner, before being appointed as a commissioner and replacing Gary Burns on 21 July 2015. As the State Coordinator, he coordinated the efforts of South Australia in policing during the COVID-19 pandemic and gave directions on quarantine, border closure, and other activities. The major emergency in regard to the pandemic operated from 2020 until 2022. On 28 June 2026, members of the Police Association of South Australia tabled a motion of no confidence in Stevens and Linda Williams, who was the Deputy Commissioner. Stevens' appointment as the next governor of South Australia occurred on 6 October 2026, following Frances Adamson.

== Early life and education ==
Grantley John Stevens was born in Adelaide, South Australia, in 1964. His family had to move many times while growing up, and he was schooled at Port Lincoln for some time and then went to Para Vista Primary School and Marryatville Primary School. Stevens' father owned a business in Kensington. Later on, he went to Banksia Park High School.

== Early police career ==
After his studies, Stevens was employed at the Target departmental store at Tea Tree Plaza. He later commented that having sorted socks while taking an inventory motivated him to look for a job beyond retail, saying his decision to join the police was a "spur-of-the-moment" one. He became a cadet with the South Australia Police (SAPOL) in 1982, when he was 17 years old.

Stevens has been a uniform officer, detective and commissioned officer. His career included operations, investigations, counter-terrorism, emergency management, community programs, drug and alcohol management and human resources. Having received his qualifications of sergeant and senior sergeant, Stevens continued his education by enrolling at the University of South Australia. He graduated with a Bachelor of Business in Human Resource Development in 1999, and a Graduate Certificate in Management in 2004.

The Paedophile Task Force was created by Stevens for SAPOL in 2003. Later, he went on to become an advisor to Justice Ted Mullighan at the Children in State Care Commission of Inquiry, as well as the leader of the group tasked with organising neighbourhood policing teams. He was also involved in domestic violence issues and operations against organised crime and outlaw motorcycle gangs. Later, Stevens was appointed Assistant Commissioner for Crime between 2005 and 2012.

Stevens was named deputy commissioner on 27 September 2012, following the appointment of Gary Burns as commissioner for South Australia. As deputy commissioner, Stevens was responsible for managing operations and emergencies for the state's police force and SAPOL's membership of the national Counter Terrorism Committee. Since 2013, Stevens has managed the SAPOL Reform Program.

== Commissioner ==
=== Appointment (2015–2020) ===
After Burns's retirement announcement, an assessment panel was put in place by the Police Minister Tony Piccolo in February 2015 to consider Stevens for appointment as the commissioner. This panel evaluated Stevens' credentials and conducted interviews. The appointment was approved in the cabinet meeting held on 16 March 2015 and made public on 19 March 2015 for a term of five years.

Stevens was appointed Commissioner of South Australia Police on 21 July 2015. Upon appointment, his priorities were police visibility, community needs, reducing crimes and employing technology so as to create extra time for officers to attend to their tasks.

Prior to the 40th anniversary of the decriminalisation of male homosexuality in South Australia, in August 2015, Stevens made his comments about the 1972 murder of George Duncan. While he recognised that accusations of police misconduct were harmful to the relations between SAPOL and the LGBT community, Stevens defended the police investigation and the further Scotland Yard investigation. The knowledge of such events was one of the means of improving the relations with the LGBT community.

On 1 July 2019, the Media Road Safety Unit of SAPOL was formed under the leadership of Stevens. The establishment took over the responsibility for road safety advertising in the light of the closing down of the Motor Accident Commission. In 2020, SAPOL started using an internal health and wellbeing website and staff reconditioning strategy.

In the period from November 2019 to January 2020, there were bushfires in Lower Yorke Peninsula, Adelaide Hills, and Kangaroo Island. There was activation of the State Emergency Centre in November and December 2019 and also in January 2020. The declaration of a major emergency on 21 November 2022 in connection with flooding in the River Murray enabled Stevens extra power in coordinating the emergency. He said that an assistant state coordinator would be assigned for the task of recovery, and that Australian Defence Force would be considered if other means had been exhausted.

=== COVID-19 pandemic and beyond (2020–2026) ===
Following the announcement of a public health emergency on 15 March 2020, SAPOL set up their Police Operations Centre on the following day and arranged for operational and business continuity plans with the state's health department. On 22 March, Stevens declared a major emergency as a state coordinator under the Emergency Management Act 2004 due to the coronavirus pandemic.

The declaration allowed Stevens to make directions about the conduct of public and private activity, including quarantine, gathering restrictions and border control measures. Initially valid for 14 days, the declaration was later extended throughout the response to the pandemic. The SAPOL managed the border applications, enforced border restrictions, and compliance with quarantine and public activities requirements.

An empty arrivals hall at Adelaide Airport on 25 May 2020

His duties included guidelines pertaining to lockdowns, quarantine in hotels, masks, and restrictions on businesses. He sought help and advice from the Chief Public Health Officer Nicola Spurrier but later stated that he did not always adhere to her advice. In June 2020, he allowed a Black Lives Matter rally in Adelaide despite the prohibition on large gatherings. Reflecting upon the rally in May 2022, he said that it was a peaceful event and no conflicts arose with the police.

The South Australian government on 4 May 2022 made an announcement for making changes to the Public Health Act to retain certain guidelines even after the major emergency ends. He supported the move and added that the major emergency declaration might end before the government expected. On 24 May 2022, the major emergency was ended after 793 days and his power to enforce pandemic guidelines came to an end. Stevens stated that around 290 guidelines were issued during the emergency period.

Stevens stated in May 2023 that police could not "as much as we might like to," cut the rope of an Extinction Rebellion activist hanging on a bridge in Adelaide and "let them drop."

On 14 May 2024, Stevens attended one day with the police to honour Sammy Scully, who was eight years old with incurable brain cancer and appointed honorary sergeant. Later on, he invited him back for another day with SAPOL Water Operations Unit. Later, on 3 January 2025, Stevens along with an inspector went to meet Scully at his home and awarded him the position of senior officer and also SAPOL Service Medal.

Stevens became a member of the Adelaide Football Club board of directors in December 2025 when Mark Ricciuto retired after completing 12 years on the board. He also happened to be the patron of Adelaide Footy League at the time. Stevens was appointed despite objections by Chris Sumner, the former attorney-general, who believed the appointment would go against the public service ethics. But the Police Minister Michael Brown defended the arrangements saying Stevens had fulfilled all disclosures while conflicts of interests were being sorted out. In addition, the minister stated that SAPOL and the football club had told him that Stevens was not involved in the Josh Worrell investigation that occurred in the following year.

Stevens outside Parliament House at the state opening of the parliament in May 2026

The police association members on 23 June 2026 voted for the motion of no-confidence against Stevens and his deputy, Linda Williams, by 92 percent. Their main complaints included staffing issues, retention, working conditions, morale, and the district policing system. The president of the police association, Wade Burns, stated that the aim was to hold the commissioners accountable and not necessarily make them resign. According to Stevens, he was disappointed with the outcome of the vote because it did not align with the feedback he had received from police officers. He pointed out that since his engagement with the state government in 2022, he had managed to get an increase of 750 more posts.

=== Appointment as governor (2026–present) ===
Stevens was invited in September 2026 to become the governor of South Australia. Stevens was nominated by King Charles III as the new governor in place of Frances Adamson on 6 October by Premier Peter Malinauskas. As a result of the appointment, he concluded is tenure as Police Commissioner in October 2026 and Williams will be acting in his place. Furthermore, he announced that he would resign from the board of the Adelaide Football Club and from being chairman of the Operation Flinders Foundation. His appointment as governor will take place on 9 December 2026.

== Personal life ==
Stevens is married to Emma and the couple has five children including Sophie, Dylan, Josh, Tom and Charlie. Their daughter's wedding was rescheduled due to COVID-19 pandemic as his decision as the State Emergency Coordinator. They married in 2020 on 5 December with 104 guests.

On 17 November 2023, Stevens visited the state's south-east following the fatal shooting of Brevet Sergeant Jason Doig who died in the line of duty when answering a callout. During that same day, Stevens' youngest son, Charlie was hit by a car during a hit-and-run accident while participating in Schoolies celebrations at Goolwa Beach. Charlie, 18 years old, died at Flinders Medical Centre on 18 November 2023 due to brain injuries.

After Charlie's death, Stevens and his wife released a letter about their son and described him as the 101st person to die on South Australian roads that year. Prime Minister Anthony Albanese read a tribute to him in parliament on 28 November.

The funeral service for Charlie took place at Adelaide Oval on 30 November 2023 where more than 1,000 people gathered. Stevens, who was a board member of the Operation Flinders Foundation, encouraged attendees to think about organ donation and make contributions towards the foundation in lieu of flowers. Over A$45,200 had been collected in memory of Charlie, while $100,000 had been promised by the government of South Australia.

Stevens has two Dachshunds, named Grace and Zoe. He is a supporter of the Adelaide Football Club and considers himself to be a "long-time Crows fan".

== Honours and awards ==
The National Medal was bestowed upon Stevens on 27 February 2001 in acknowledgment of 15 years of distinguished service as a senior sergeant. Stevens was presented with the Australian Police Medal (APM) in the 2012 Australia Day Honours in acknowledgment of distinguished service.

Stevens received an honorary Doctor of the University from the University of South Australia in 2015 for his contribution to public service and public safety in South Australia. By 2020, Stevens was awarded the SAPOL Leadership and Efficiency Medal.The University of South Australia Alumni Award was conferred upon him in 2021.

In October 2024, Stevens was nominated for the South Australian category of Australian of the Year Award. In December 2025, Flinders University conferred upon Stevens an honorary Doctor of the University in acknowledgment of his services to SAPOL, emergency management and community services in connection with the death of his son.

Police appointments
| Preceded by Gary Burns | Deputy Commissioner of South Australia Police; 2012–2015 | Succeeded by Linda Williams |
| Preceded by Gary Burns | Commissioner of South Australia Police; 2015–present | Succeeded by Incumbent |
