= Vehicle registration plates of South Australia =

South Australian vehicle license plates

The state of South Australia requires its residents to register their motor vehicles and display vehicle registration plates. Current regular issue plates are to the standard Australian dimensions of 372 mm (14.6 in) in length by 134 mm (5.3 in) in height, and use standard Australian serial dies.

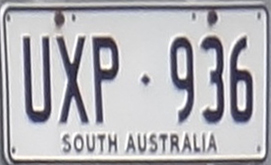
South Australia (pre 1981)

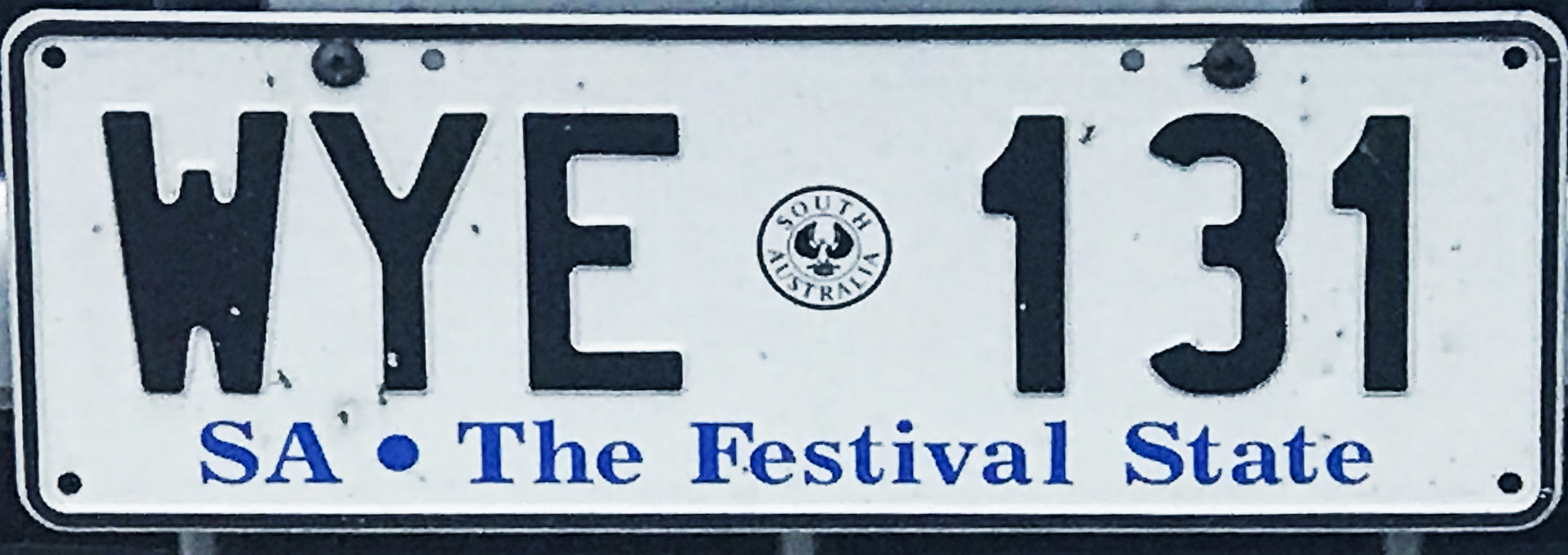
SA – The Festival State

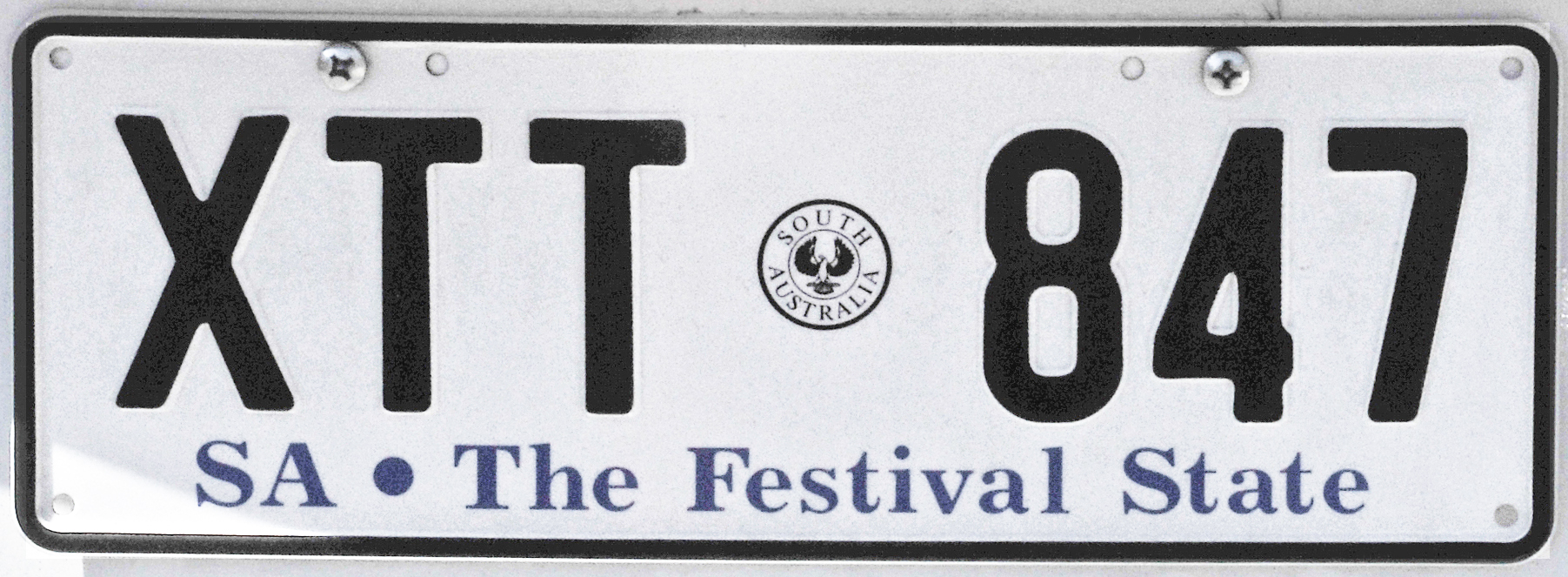
An X-series SA Registration. Note the differences in embossed dies compared to the V-series. It is a change of manufacturer in 1994 to George and again in 2002 to Altona as pictured as the previous manufacturer of V plates in Adelaide has closed down in 1994. Since 2003 the contract went to the current contractor making the current style as Altona folded.

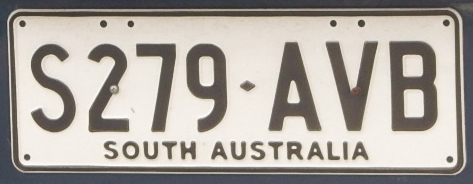
Current South Australia registration plate

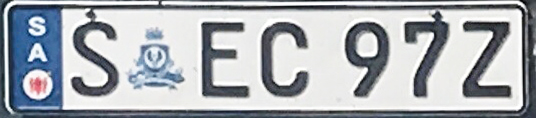
Europlate

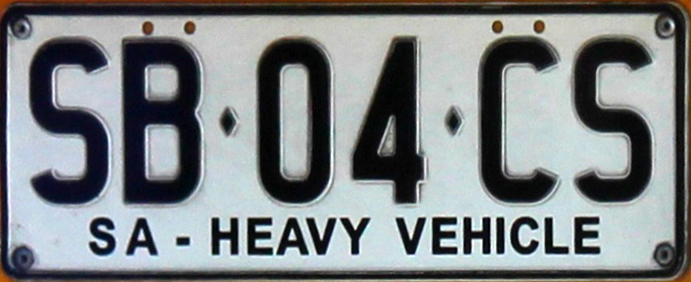
Heavy vehicle

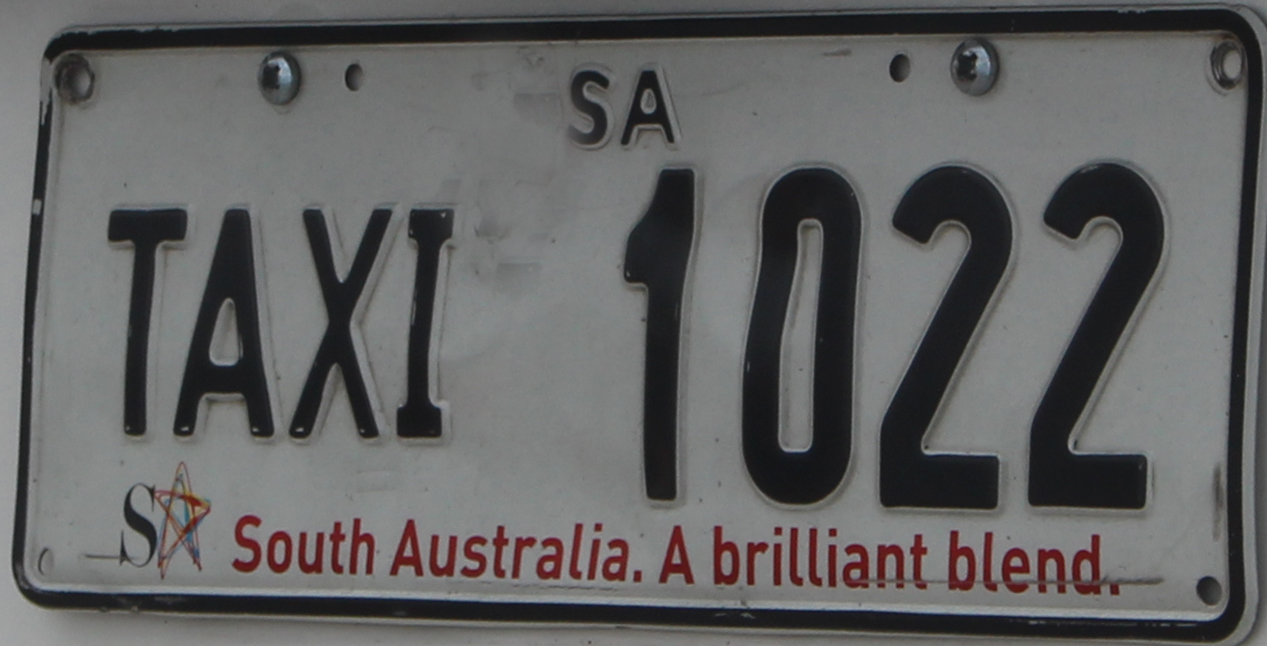
Taxicab registration plate

Government and Police registration plate

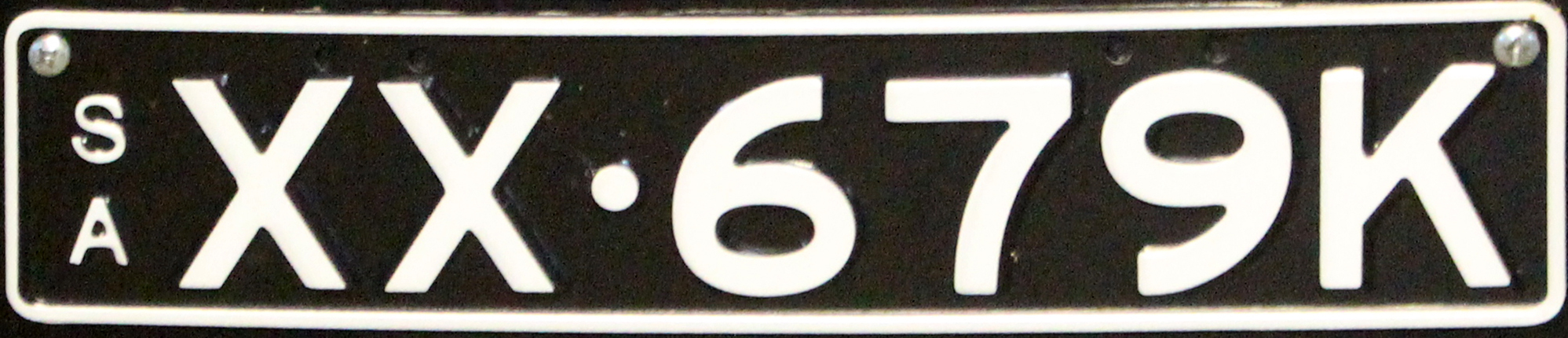
Premium plate

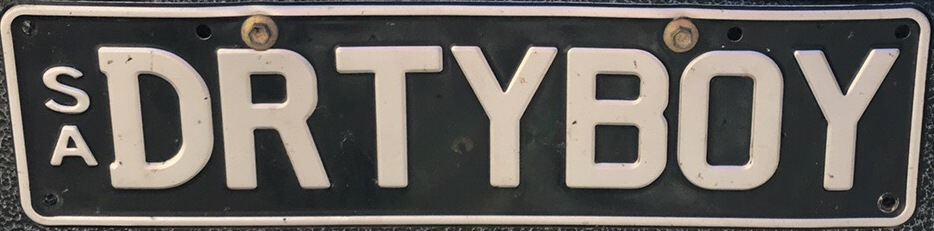
Personalised

== General series ==
Vehicles and trailers: S000·ABC

Motorcycles: S00·ABC

In South Australia, until October 2008, standard registration plates followed the 3-letter, 3-number (aaa.nnn) standard used by New South Wales and Victoria: their series, introduced in 1966 started with RAA-000 and finished at XUN-299.

Since October 2008, South Australian general issue plates follow the format Snnn-aaa, the S signifying South Australia. No slogan is printed on these plates, rather they contain the words 'South Australia'.

Up until 1966 South Australian plates were all numerical, and were subject to re-issue, in either nn-nnn or nnn-nnn format, white on black background. These plates are available for re-issue at a fee.

Post 1966, motorcycles were initially issued with RA-000 to SZ-999 then TAA-000 to TIZ-999. Trailers were issued TJA-000 to TZZ-999. When the Taa-nnn issues were exhausted, motorcycles were issued with high end YYA-000 to YZZ-999, then started at YKA-000 to YKA-799, and trailers issued YAA-000 to YIL-999. Since 2008, newly issued plates are in the form S000-AAA and motorcycles as S00-AAA, while trailers start at S000-TAA.

=== Highs ===
Cars: S000·DNA

Trailers: S050·TMM

Motorcycles: S00·CEA

== EzyPlates ==
EzyPlates is administered by the Department for Infrastructure & Transport.

- Premium Plates

Since 1995, "Premium" registration plates can be purchased which are much more compact in size, in the format aa-nnna: the letter is usually repeated (e.g.: AA-nnna, BB-nnna, current series DD-nnna). These seem to follow the New South Wales Premium format, using black lettering on a white background on a noticeably slimmer plate. South Australian "Premium" registration plates feature black characters on a white base, and the letters "SA" down the side, in the same format as NSW "Premium" registration plates. As of 28 September 2009, there is a new addition to the premium range – white on black base, from XX-000A onwards.

- Personalised plates: Introduced in 1979, in green on yellow original format with South Australia legend at the top. It started as aa-nnnn, aaa-nnn and aaaa-nn. Available for general vehicles, trailers and motorcycles in 1996, the range was revamped, to the premium style dies and later with more recent dies, and has additional colour range on top of the original green on reflective yellow.
- Euro Plates: Euro white range was introduced in the 2010s; as of 10 November 2025, added black Euro option.
- Custom Plates: Introduced in the 1990s and revised to the current range of colours. Can order up to 7 characters and is also available for trailers and motorcycles. As of 10 November 2025, Electric colours were introduced replicating where offered in other states.
- Japanese JDM: The Department for Infrastructure & Transport is proposing a JDM plate in black, red, green and magenta colours on reflective white with SOUTH AUSTRALIA embossed at the bottom and Japanese inscription at the top. It will come in set series and custom options. Yet to be released as is currently seeking feedback via their X page before they can be released. It finally released in a final style during February 2024. Two styles are offered.

== Special purpose plates ==
Government and police vehicles has SA Government plates in blue text on white background as S000·AQA (or previously XQA-000), with a Q as the second letter. Older systems were allocated SAA-000 to SZZ-999 to government services as well. The legend is embossed as SA Government.

Ambulances belonging to SA Ambulance Service have plates in the form AMB-nnn, however some vehicles now have standard SA Government plates due to leasing agreements with the State Government (Fleet SA).

Metropolitan taxis have plates with the word TAXI in a smaller size followed by three or four numbers, separated by the current tourism logo for South Australia – SA, A Brilliant Blend. As of 8 December 2025, a new style Taxi plate in dark blue background on white and a plain South Australia legend and SA logo were launched. More recently a new country taxi plate has been introduced in black on reflective yellow replacing general issue plates on SA country taxis. Other chauffeured vehicles have a different style plate with a blue outline. As of 8 December 2025 a new version replaced the previous format changing to white on navy blue. It is in line with SA taxi accreditation changes.

Since September 2007, The heavy vehicle series commenced and the format used is SB·00·AA with the legend SA – HEAVY VEHICLE, the trailers start at SY·00·AA

== General issue ==
No general issue SA registration plates (other than government) are issued with the letter Q anywhere in the combination. The only exception is the series VPQ-nnn and WSQ-nnn – both of which were the first set issued by a new manufacturer.

In 1980, a poll was conducted by the Government of South Australia to come up with a slogan. "SA - Centre of it All" was the most popular, but the government decided to go with :SA - The Festival State" for the Adelaide Festival.

Between 1981 and October 2008, all general issue SA plates contained the "SA – The Festival State". Between 1997 and October 2008, other slogans were available for an additional fee, including: South Australia – Gateway to the Outback; South Australia – The Defence State; South Australia – The Wine State; South Australia – the Creative State; South Australia – The Rose State; and South Australia – The Electronics State. All slogan plates are discontinued, as at October 2008.

It is also possible to obtain a wide variety of vanity plates that feature full-colour illustrations and customised logos or slogans.

== Skipped combinations ==
aaa-nnn series: AAA-QZZ (All except AMB), RAQ, RBQ up to XTQ (All except VPQ and WSQ), RQA-RQZ, SQA-SQZ, UIA-UIZ, VDA-VDZ, VIA-VIZ, VZA-VZZ, WOG, WOP, XUN(300-999), XUO-XZZ, YAQ, YBQ up to YHQ, YIM-YXZ (All except YKA-000 to YKA-799), YYQ, YZQ, ZAA-ZZZ.

S-nnn-aaa series: AAQ, ABQ up to DNQ, ARA-ARZ, CIA-CIZ, BQN to BQZ. TAQ, TBQ up to TMQ.

S-nn-aaa series: AAQ, ABQ up to CFQ, BQL to BQZ.

== Discontinued plates ==
- Interstate trucks: IS·nnnn Allocated from IS-0000 from 1960 until December 1966, and was replaced by the general series allocation RIS·nnn and from 1976, was again replaced by the RI·nnnn, series as it were allocated as RI-0000 to RI-9999 and SI-0000 to SI-9999 until it was replaced by the now obsolete FIRS scheme in 1987.
