= Andy Wells =

Andy Wells may refer to:

- Andy Wells (Canadian politician) (1944/5–2021), mayor of St. John's, Newfoundland and Labrador
- Andy Wells (American politician) (born 1954), politician in North Carolina

== See also ==
- Andrew Wells, fictional character in the television series Buffy the Vampire Slayer and Angel
- Andrew Wells, lead singer of Eidola, and lead singer and rhythm guitarist of post-hardcore band Dance Gavin Dance since 2024.
- William Andrew Noye Wells, Australian barrister known as Andrew Wells
