= Doreen Bridges =

Australian music educator, composer and lecturer

Doreen Miriam Bridges (11 June 1918 – 13 September 2024) was an Australian music educator and researcher whose work shaped early childhood music education and Kodaly method in Australia.

== Education ==
Doreen Miriam Jacobs was born in Glenelg, South Australia on 11 June 1918 to Roland Ellis Jacobs and Olga Jacobs. She attended Walford House School and at the age of 14 became a piano student of Miss Maude Puddy at the Elder Conservatorium and in 1936 was awarded the AMEB scholarship for the Bachelor of Music course. In 1941, she graduated with a Bachelor of Music from the Elder Conservatorium of Music. While at The University of Adelaide she served on the University Women's Union including a term as president.

Bridges moved to London in 1948 and studied composition with Professor Alan Bush at the Royal Academy of Music, achieving Diplomas in school music, aural training and class singing.

== Musical composition ==
Bridges was recognised as a composer who included Australian themes. Her work, 'Two Songs of Eureka' was included in the 1950 South Australian Festival of Music. In 1950 Bridges composed the music to Helen Palmer's song 'The Ballad of 1891' which details the lead up to the 1891 shearers' strike and its aftermath.

== Career ==
In 1944, Bridges enlisted in the Women's Auxiliary Australian Air Force and became an education officer.

Bridges was Senior Lecturer at the Nursery School Teachers' College and the University of Sydney, influencing teachers and early years practitioners. After moving to New South Wales she became a member of the Communist Party of Australia (1947—1955).

== Recognition ==
Bridges was appointed to the Research Commission of the International Society for Music Education, and was recognised as an Honorary Life Member of the Kodály Music Education Institute of Australia, an honorary member of the Australian Society for Music Education, and Patron of Dalcroze Australia.

In the 1984 Australia Day Honours, Bridges was awarded a Member of the Order of Australia for services to music education. In 2008, in honour of her 90th birthday, Martin Comte edited a festschrift called Musical Dimensions which was published by Australian Scholarly Publishing in 2009.

== Publications ==
- Bridges, Doreen M. (1978). Australian test for advanced music studies. Hale & Iremonger. ISBN 0855631791.
- Bridges, Doreen (1999). Music, Young Children & You: A parent-teacher guide to music for 0-5 year olds. Hale & Iremonger. ISBN 9780868065304.
- Hoermann, Deanna; Bridges, Doreen (1988). Catch A Song. Incentive Publications. ISBN 9780865300637.
