= MedSTAR =

Medical retrieval service for the state of South Australia

SAAS MedSTAR

Agency overview
- Formed: 2007
- Jurisdiction: South Australia
- Agency executive: Dr Andrew Pearce, Director
- Parent agency: SA Ambulance Service
- Website: www.sahealth.sa.gov.au/medstar

SAAS MedSTAR is the specialist emergency medical retrieval service for the state of South Australia. MedStar is operated by SA Health through the SA Ambulance Service and is designed to respond to trauma, medical and disaster emergencies anywhere within the state. MedSTAR Kids is the paediatric and neonatal service provided by MedSTAR.

== History ==
MedSTAR's development commenced in 2007 and it has been operating since early 2009. Prior to MedSTAR's inception, emergency medical retrievals were carried out by one of three possible teams: one from the Royal Adelaide Hospital (RAH), one from the Flinders Medical Centre (FMC) and one from the Women's and Children's Hospital (WCH - for paediatric or neonatal emergencies). In a case where a helicopter would be needed, one would be dispatched to either the RAH or FMC (the WCH team would travel to the RAH because WCH doesn't have a helipad) after the appropriate and most available team was selected. After picking up the retrieval team members it would then head to the emergency. This setup meant it could take up to half an hour before the team was en route to the patient. As a result, it was decided that one single service based near the helicopter would be more appropriate as it would cut down response times and resolve issues pertaining to which team would be chosen to retrieve the patient/s.

Another issue that was prevalent in the old system was a lack of uniform standards. The RAH and FMC teams were trained differently and had different equipment and different levels of qualifications. The old system also lacked a single point of contact, so requesting retrievals was a tricky process and there was also a lack of dedicated rapid-response vehicles for road-based retrievals. With one statewide service, these issues were resolved.

== About MedSTAR's Services ==
Around 20% of MedSTAR's work involves responding to metropolitan emergencies, such as motor vehicle crashes. However, the majority (80%) of MedSTAR's work is critical-care transportation, to allow already hospitalised patients who require a higher level of care access to Intensive Care beds at better-equipped and staffed hospitals. Examples of this might include a patient at a metropolitan hospital that has an insufficient ICU or no ICU beds available or a patient from a rural hospital that needs a higher level of care than the hospital can provide. MedSTAR can also be contacted by doctors for advice on patient care.

The service has a neonatal and paediatric division called MedSTAR Kids. MedSTAR Kids has challenged thinking in neonatal retrieval care at times and have presented cases where they have successfully retrieved babies once thought to be too young to transfer with good outcomes.

MedSTAR responds to various emergencies such as medical emergencies (such as acute pulmonary oedema) as well as primary trauma (such as a severe crash).

The strength of MedSTAR is their Coordination service which uses Nurse Consultants to clinically assess all aeromedical patients needing transfer and then clinically prioritises them escalating the care of patients they are concerned about to MedSTAR Retrieval Consultants.

The remote clinical assessment skills used in the clinical coordination of these patients is underpinned by a clinical simulation and accreditation process supported by evidence and a learning system.

== Aircraft ==
MedSTAR uses the Royal Flying Doctors Service (RDFS) for fixed-wing aeromedical patients. They clinically prioritise their patients and secure RFDS to provide the transport. When a patient is critically unwell they will provide a retrieval team to provide the augmented level of care necessary for the patient.

MedSTAR utilises helicopters to respond to emergencies. These helicopters are operated and crewed under contract by Babcock. This service was formerly delivered by Australian Helicopters. The six helicopters are:

- Bell 412 x3

- 2x in permanent medical configuration and 1x in Police configuration.

The colour schemes for the 412s are:

- 2x red and white- VH-LSA/VH-VAO
- 1x blue and white- VH-LSY

Also in use are Isuzu MU-X rapid response vehicles, similar to the SA Ambulance Service Regional Team Leader vehicles.

== See also ==
- Air ambulance
