= Roland Ellis Jacobs =

South Australian businessman

- Born: 28 February 1891; Adelaide
- Alma mater: Geelong College
- Occupation: Businessperson
- Spouse(s): Esther Lipman
- Children: Sam Jacobs, Doreen Bridges
- Parent(s): S. J. Jacobs
- Awards: Knight Bachelor (1963)

Sir Roland Ellis "Raoul" Jacobs (28 February 1891 – 28 June 1981) was a South Australian businessman, for many years at the head of South Australia's largest brewery and hotel chain, and an active supporter of many high-profile cultural, sporting and charitable organizations.

== History ==
Sir Roland was born in Adelaide the youngest child and only son of Samuel Joshua Jacobs (28 March 1853 – 4 January 1937) and his wife Caroline Jacobs, née Ellis. Samuel was well known in business and sporting circles, having been both chairman of directors of S.A.B.C. and an S.A.J.C. committee member for over 30 years. Sir Roland was educated at Geelong College and the Adelaide Shorthand and Business Training Academy, of which his father was a generous patron. Roland (who had been 2nd Lieutenant with the 16th Australian Light Horse Regiment a few years previously) volunteered for active service during the First World War, but was rejected as unfit and instead served as a training officer in Adelaide.

After a few clerical jobs, he was appointed in 1924 to a managerial position in Adelaide for brewers' supplier F. A. Henriques Ltd. This company, based in Perth, Western Australia, was taken over by Mauri Bros. and Thomson in July 1930. He was appointed assistant-manager and then manager. In July 1948 he was appointed to the board of the South Australian Brewing Company, and promptly elected managing director then chairman in 1951, which he retained until March 1965. He held the managing director's position until June 1961.

== Other interests ==
Sir Roland was a member of the Adelaide Club, a member and president of Adelaide Rotary Club in 1938, the Commonwealth Club, Meals on Wheels, Crippled Children's Association, the Adelaide Chamber of Commerce, and R.S.P.C.A. He was a member of the Adelaide Festival of Arts board of governors, the National council of the Australian Boy Scouts Association, boards of the Royal Adelaide Hospital and Queen Elizabeth Hospital and vice-president of the SA branch of the National Heart Foundation.

He never renounced the Jewish faith into which he was born, but was not a strong adherent.

== Family ==
He married Olga Hertzberg (1897–1969) on 29 August 1917. Her father was a Queensland businessman and at one time mayor of Roma, Queensland. They had three children:

- Doreen Miriam Jacobs AM D.Mus (11 June 1918–13 September 2024) married architect (Frederick) Peter Bridges (13 September 1915 – 10 September 2001) around 1950. She was a noted teacher of music, pianist and member of the Australian Communist Party for a time, awarded AM in 1984 for services to music education.
- Samuel Joshua "Sam" Jacobs AO QC (6 December 1920 – 11 October 2011) married Mary Gordon Scott (6 December 1919 – 8 August 2007) He was a noted Freemason, barrister (initially with Browne, Rymill and Stevens) and judge, and awarded the AO in 1982.
- Eleanor Caroline Jacobs (born 18 December 1921, Deceased) married William Andrew Noye Wells, barrister and judge.

He married Esther "Ess" Cook (née Solomon) MBE (6 April 1900 – 27 January 1991) on 30 November 1970. This was her third marriage. Esther was a daughter of Vaiben Louis Solomon. They lived on Tusmore Avenue, Leabrook.

== Recognition ==
A caricature, by staff artist Lionel Coventry, was published in the Advertiser in 1949.

He was knighted in 1963.

A portrait of Jacobs was painted by Sir William Dargie.
