= Ken Martin (Australian sculptor) =

South Australian sculptor (born 1952)

Ken Martin (born 1952) is a South Australian sculptor.

== History ==
Ken began sculpting professionally in wood, in 1975.

He undertook a study tour of Great Britain and Italy in 1992, to coincide with a showing of his work in the Royal Academy of Arts' "Summer Exhibition" in London, which coincided with a commitment to bronze as his favoured medium. Since then the majority of his work has been commissioned representational studies.

== Notable works ==
- The Net Mender, featuring Jack Davies, in Port Lincoln
- Len Beadell Surveyor and author (2004)
- Makybe Diva, triple Melbourne Cup winner, in Port Lincoln (2006)
- Dr. Robin Warren AC, Nobel Laureate pathologist, for St Peter's College, Adelaide (2009)
- Jason Gillespie at Adelaide Oval (2010)
- Vaiben Louis Solomon Lord Mayor and Parliamentarian (2012)
- Esther Lipman MBE, Adelaide's first woman councillor, in Adelaide's North Parklands
- Barrie Robran MBE, triple Magarey Medallist near the south gate at Adelaide Oval (2013)
- Darren Lehmann, cricketer, at Adelaide Oval (2012)
