= William Andrew Noye Wells =

Australian judge

William Andrew Noye Wells AO (6 March 1919 – 18 November 2004), commonly referred to as W. A. N. Wells was a barrister in South Australia and judge of the Supreme Court of South Australia. It is likely he was known to friends and family as "Andrew".

== History ==
Wells was born in North Adelaide to Alfred Cuthbert Wells (1884–1952) and his wife Angelica Leslie Wells, née Pooler (1887–1969), who married in 1910.

He was a student as St Peter's College, and in 1938 commenced a Law degree at Adelaide University, winning a Stow Prize in his first year, then in June 1940 enlisted with the 2nd AIF, and was promptly promoted to sergeant with the Intelligence corps, then transferred to Signals Battalion, reduced to corporal. He was discharged on 22 July 1944.

He returned to his studies at the University of Adelaide in 1945, and in November of that year was awarded the David Murray Scholarship in Law. He was selected as a Rhodes Scholar in 1945, and at Oxford University he earned a Bachelor of Arts (in jurisprudence), and Bachelor of Civil Law. He was admitted to the Supreme Court of South Australia in 1950. By 1977 he was entitled to the appellation "The Honourable Mr Justice", and by 1988, when he was appointed an Officer of the Order of Australia, he had Queen's Counsel added to his list of distinctions.

== Other recognition ==
Around 1986 a bust of Wells by John Dowie was installed at the Lands Titles Office, 101 Grenfell Street, Adelaide.

== Family ==
Wells married Eleanor Caroline Jacobs (18 December 1921 – 29 June 2014), daughter of Roland Ellis Jacobs. They had four children.
