= Rex Lipman =

Rex John Lipman AO (26 April 1922 – 4 July 2015) was an Australian entrepreneur.

== History ==
Lipman was born in Adelaide, South Australia, the third and youngest child of Esther "Ess" Lipman MBE, née Solomon, MBE (1900–1991) and her husband, dentist Hyam "Boy" Lipman. His mother was the first woman councillor of Adelaide City Council and Vaiben Louis Solomon MHA MHR (1853–1908) was a grandfather.

He was enrolled at Queen’s School as a boarder, then transferred to Walkerville Public School. He attended St Peter's College from 1933 to 1937. He joined the Militia in 1938 and was employed as a clerk by Goldsbrough Mort in Victoria, where he enlisted with the Australian Army in December 1941. He served as Mortar Officer and Signals Officer with the 10th Battalion in South Australia with the rank of lieutenant and in April 1941 transferred to 24/39 Battalion. In January 1942 he transferred to 2/4th Independent Company with whom he served in Timor from December 1942 to January 1943, when they withdrew. In October 1943 he was promoted Captain in 2/43 Battalion.

He re-enlisted in November 1952 with the Citizens' Military Forces (CMF) 10th Infantry Battalion as Lieutenant-Colonel. In 1950 he was a Captain with the Adelaide University Regiment. In 1958 he was awarded the Efficiency Decoration (ED) and was struck off strength in September 1960.

He was a close friend of Rupert Murdoch, Tim Fischer, Bart Cummings, Alexander Downer, John Olsen, and Dean Brown.

== Family ==
On 22 May 1947, at the Church of the Epiphany, Crafers, Lipman married Eve Fisher, a daughter of Guy Fisher of "Pine Hill", Mount Lofty. (Note: Pine Hill was previously owned by Francis Joseph "Frank" Fisher (1859–1927), a son of Joseph Fisher (1834–1907).) Lipman met Fisher in 1942 at the Adelaide Hospital, where she was serving as a nurse.
