= Craig Challen =

Australian veterinary surgeon and technical diver

Craig Challen SC, OAM
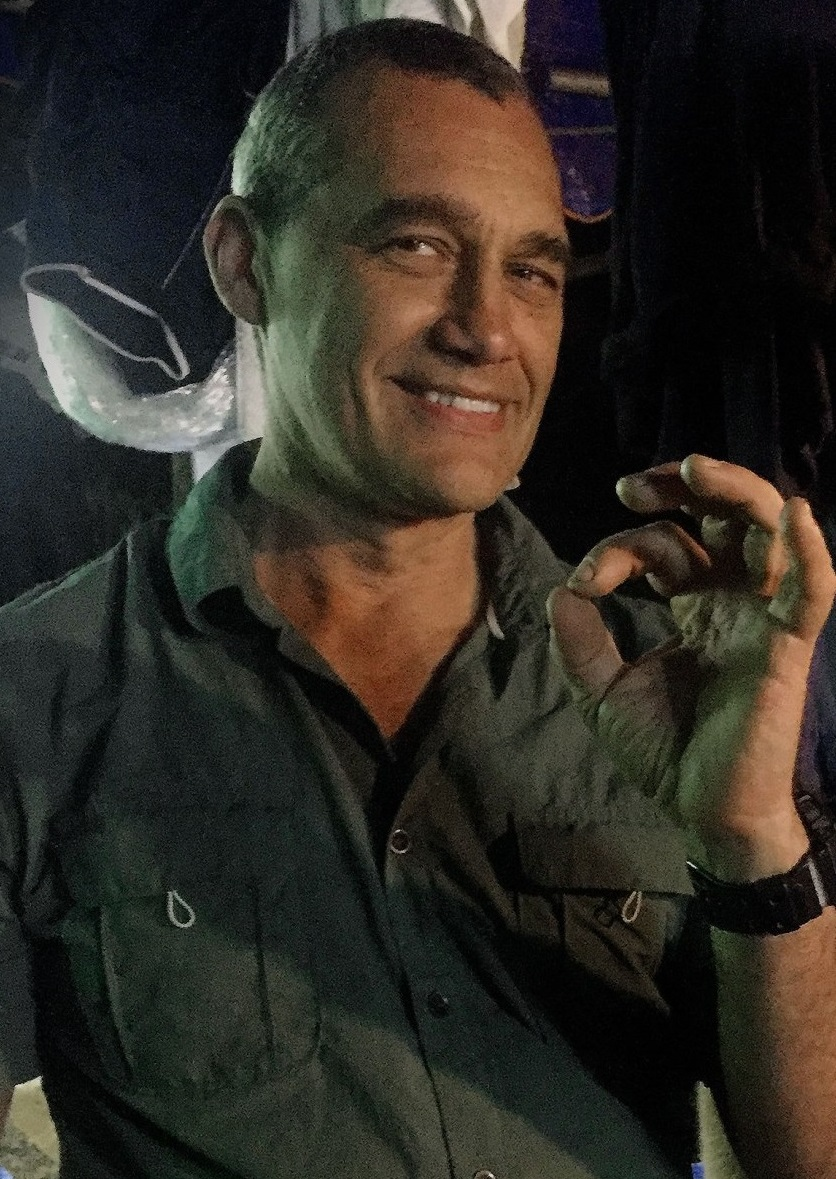
- Challen in 2018
- Born: Craig Jonathan Challen; 1965 (age 60–61); Perth, Western Australia
- Education: Murdoch University
- Occupations: Veterinarian; Businessman
- Known for: Tham Luang cave rescue
- Partner: Heather Endall
- Medical career
- Field: Veterinary medicine
- Awards: Star of Courage; Medal of the Order of Australia; Knight Grand Cross (First Class) of the Most Admirable Order of the Direkgunabhorn (Thailand); Australian of the Year 2019; Oztek 2009 Diver of the Year; Western Australian of the Year 2019

Craig Jonathan Challen SC, OAM, PBh (GCT) (born 1965) is an Australian cave diver and retired veterinary surgeon who played a substantial role in the Tham Luang cave rescue. He was the recipient of the Oztek 2009 Diver of the Year award for his services to caving, and was joint winner of the 2019 Australian of the Year with his long-time dive partner Richard Harris.

== Early life and career ==
Challen grew up in the Perth suburb of Thornlie and later on a 200 ha (500 acres) farming property in Gidgegannup; he attended Eastern Hills Senior High School in Mount Helena, near Gidgegannup.

Challen graduated from Murdoch University in 1987 with a degree in veterinary science. He co-founded Vetwest animal hospitals in Perth. Challen retired as a veterinarian in 2017.

== Cave diving ==
Challen learned to cave dive in 1997. He has made notable dives in Cocklebiddy Cave, Australia, Pearse Resurgence, New Zealand, and Boesmansgat, South Africa. In 2010 he made a record-setting 194 m (636 ft) dive while caving in New Zealand. In 2020 he made a second record-setting return visit to the Pearse Resurgence and extended the Australasian depth record to 245 m (804 ft) with Richard Harris. In 2023, Challen supported Harris' experimental use of hydrogen as a rebreather diluent gas while diving to 230 metres (750 ft). In 2024, Challen and Harris dived to 272 metres (892 ft) at Boesmansgat while utilizing hydrogen. (Note: Harris also conducted a dive to 284 metres (932 ft).)

In 2011, Challen and Harris recovered the body of their friend Agnes Milowka from Tank Cave in South Australia.

=== Tham Luang cave rescue ===
In 2018 Challen, along with Harris, was involved in a cave rescue operation in Thailand to evacuate 12 children and their assistant coach from the flooded Tham Luang Cave system. Challen performed medical assessments and administered additional ketamine after the boys and coach had been dived through a flooded section of the cave. Challen and Harris co-authored Against All Odds which details their accounts of the rescue.

== Awards ==
On 24 July 2018, Challen was awarded the Star of Courage (SC) and Medal of the Order of Australia (OAM) by the Governor-General of Australia for his role in the Thai cave rescue. On 7 September 2018 the King of Thailand appointed Challen as a Knight Grand Cross (First Class) of the Most Admirable Order of the Direkgunabhorn. Challen received an honorary degree from Murdoch University, his alma mater.

Challen is the joint-winner of the 2019 Australian of the Year award with Richard Harris, and 2019 Western Australian of the Year.

== Personal life ==
Challen pilots and owns both a helicopter and an aeroplane.

== See also ==
- Deep diving – underwater diving to a depth beyond the norm
