= Esther Lipman =

Australian politician (1900–1991)

Esther Lipman OBE
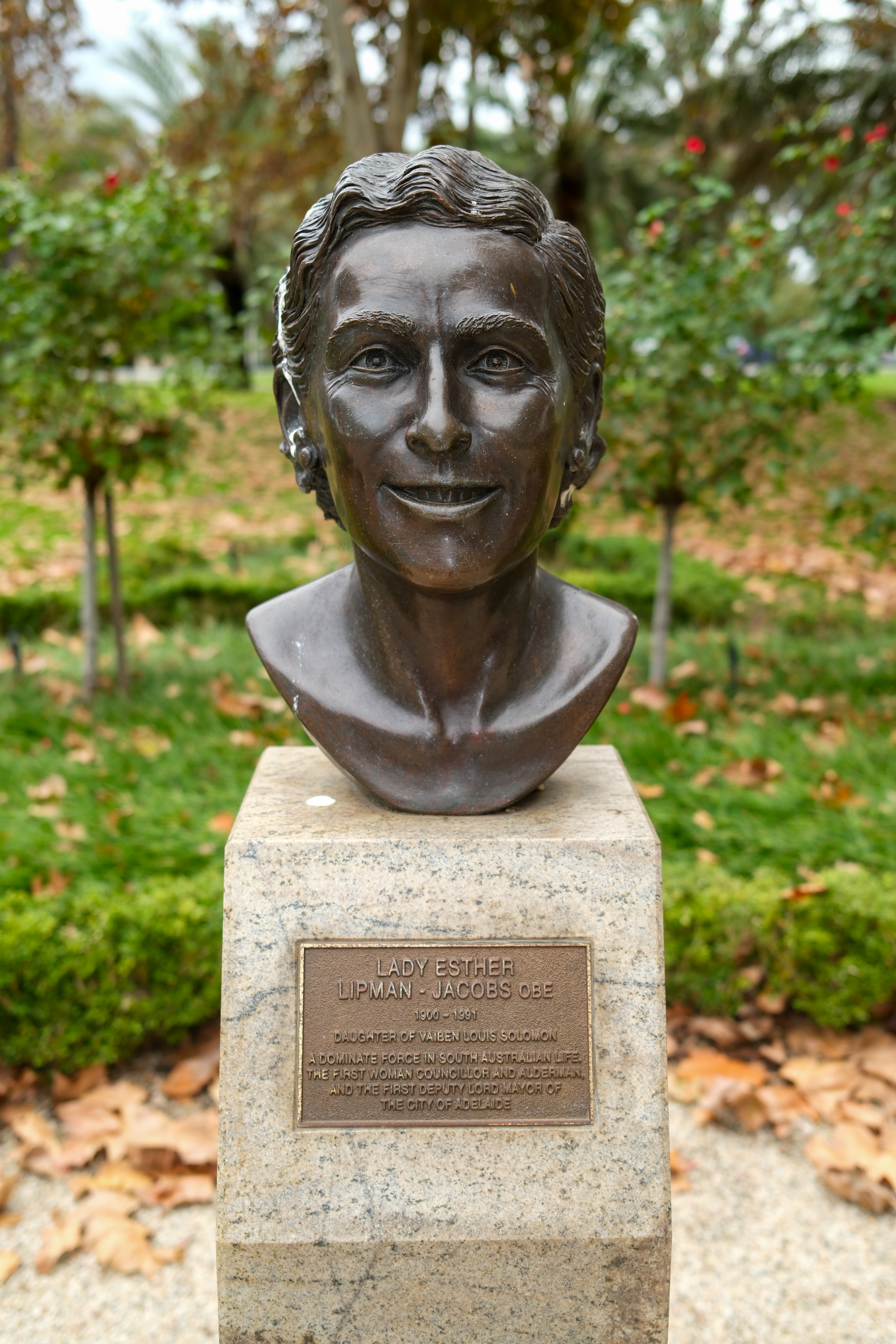
- Bust of Lipman in 2026

Councillor on the Adelaide City Council
- In office 1956

Alderman on the Adelaide City Council
- In office 1969

Deputy Mayor of Adelaide
- In office 1974–1975, 1976–1977

Personal details
- Born: 6 April 1900 Medindie, South Australia
- Died: 27 January 1991 (aged 90)
- Spouse(s): Hyam John Lipman; Roland Ellis Jacobs
- Parent: Vaiben Louis Solomon (father)

Esther Lipman OBE (née Solomon; 6 April 1900 – 27 January 1991) was a significant figure in the history of Adelaide. Noted for her support of various civic, cultural and charitable bodies, she was Adelaide's first woman councillor, alderman and Deputy Mayor. After the death of her husband she married another two times, being subsequently known as Esther Cook, and Lady Esther Jacobs or Lipman-Jacobs.

== Early life ==
Esther Solomon was born at Robe Terrace, Medindie, South Australia, third child of the politician Vaiben Louis Solomon and his wife Alice Solomon née Cohen.

== Career ==
During the war she was honorary secretary of the Fighting Forces Comforts Fund and leader of the Auxiliary Women Police. She was president of the Hackney Free Kindergarten, and a member of the executive of the Kindergarten Union. She served as vice president, deputy chairman and acting chairman in the absence of Mrs Stanley Verco. The Emergency Maternity Hospital at Mile End was established largely at her instigation. She was for many years chairman of the women's committee of the SA Lawn Tennis Association, and was, with Mrs K. L. Litchfield, one of two women on the Davis Cup committee in 1952. She was a regular player with the Toorak Tennis Club and was an associate at Kooyonga. In 1954 she succeeded Ruth Gibson as president of the SA branch of the National Council of Women after serving as vice-president for many years.

She was elected to the Adelaide City Council as councillor in 1956 and alderman in 1969, and served for 22 years, including a term as Deputy Lord Mayor and on occasion Acting Lord Mayor. She founded the Local Government Women's Association and was chairman of the Parks and Gardens Committee and served on the Board of Governors of the Adelaide Festival of Arts from 1962 to 1972 as a Council representative.

== Family ==
Esther married dentist Hyam John "Boy" Lipman (11 January 1889 – 16 March 1960) on 9 April 1919. They had three children:

- Alice Sylvia Lipman (1920– )
- Gerald John Lipman (1921–1928)
- Dr Rex John Lipman (26 April 1922 – 4 July 2015)

She married again, to Harrold Cook, but details are elusive.

She married one more time, to Sir Roland Ellis "Raoul" Jacobs on 30 November 1970.

"Boy" Lipman's brother, the actor J. A. Lipman, married Esther's cousin Gertrude Solomon on 19 February 1917.

== Recognition ==
Esther Lipman was made a Member of the Order of the British Empire in the 1946 New Year's Honours list and promoted to Officer in the 1978 New Year's Honours.

She was one of eighteen women, chosen for their public service, to be received by Elizabeth II in Adelaide during the Royal Visit of 1954.

The Esther Lipman Garden, located near the Torrens Parade Ground, was created in 1990 in her honour. It features a bust in her likeness created by sculptor Ken Martin.

The Lady Esther Jacobs Room in the Adelaide Town Hall is named in her honour.
