= SA Ambulance Service =

Agency overview
- Formed: 1993
- Preceding agency: St. John Ambulance Australia
- Jurisdiction: South Australia
- Headquarters: 216 Greenhill Road, Eastwood SA 5063
- Employees: ~2200 salaried; ~1200 volunteers
- Agency executive: Robert Elliott ASM MStJ, Chief Executive Officer
- Parent agency: SA Health
- Child agency: MedSTAR
- Website: Official website

SA Ambulance Service (SAAS) is a State Government agency under SA Health, that provides emergency ambulance transport, clinical care and non emergency patient transport services to over 1.5 million people, distributed across an area of 1,043,514 square kilometres in South Australia, Australia.

The service employs approximately 1600 people, and utilizes 1200 volunteers, working out of 105 locations, operating 385 ambulance vehicles to provide emergency, non-emergency, aeromedical, rescue and retrieval services across the entire state.

== History ==
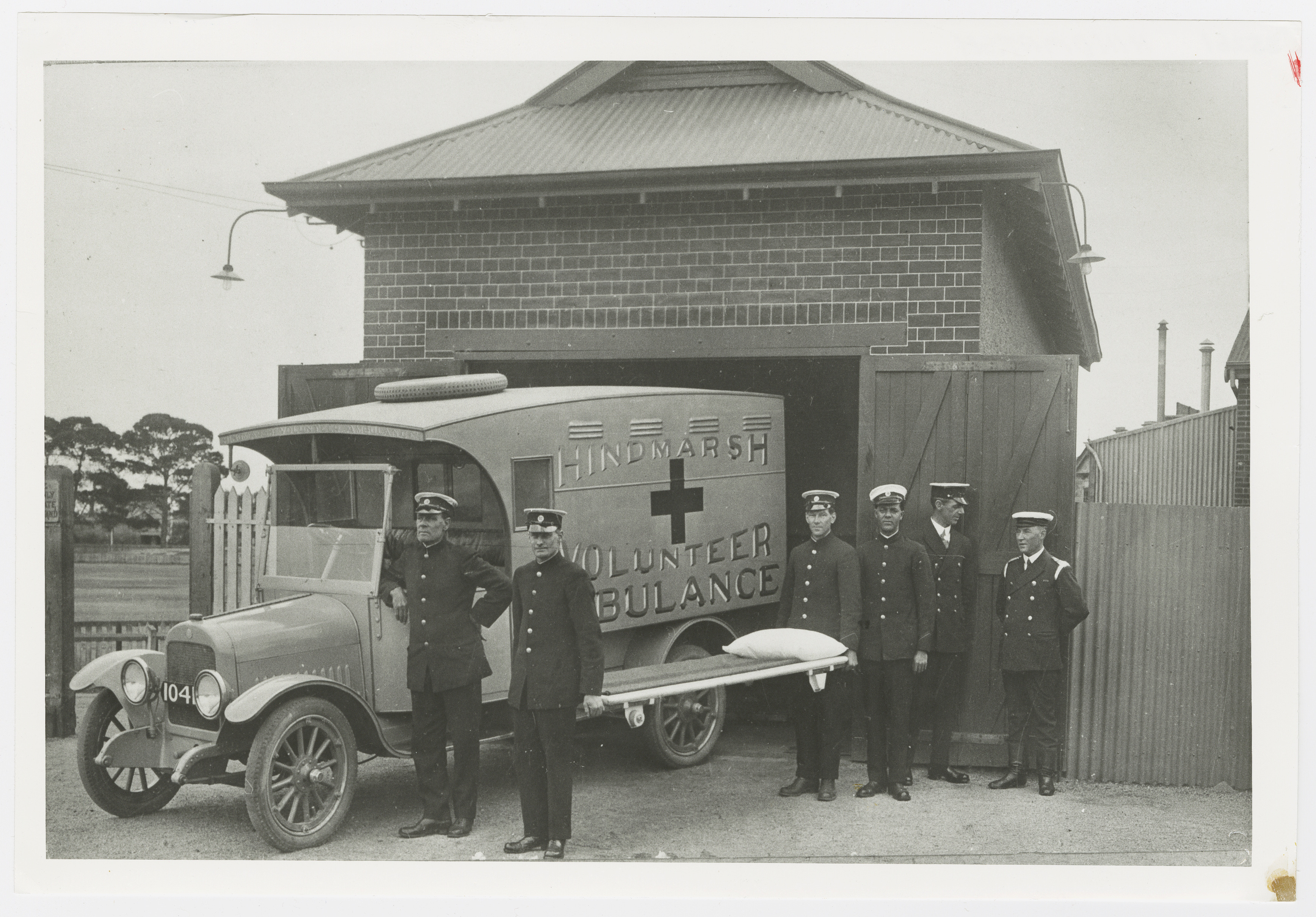
Hindmarsh Volunteer Ambulance 1923

In 1949 the metropolitan area was served by:

- SA Ambulance Transport Inc. (originally Hindmarsh Volunteer Ambulance formed in 1921), seven vehicles based at Hindmarsh, Unley (from March 1931 on behalf of Unley City Council) and Port Adelaide (started in July 1922 as Port Adelaide Citizen's Ambulance)
- Civil Ambulance (Police Department) two vehicles based at Angas St, Adelaide
- Northern Suburbs Ambulance Association, one vehicle based at Prospect since 1 January 1947
- Joe Myren's Private Ambulance, one vehicle based at Glen Osmond Road, Parkside since June 1927
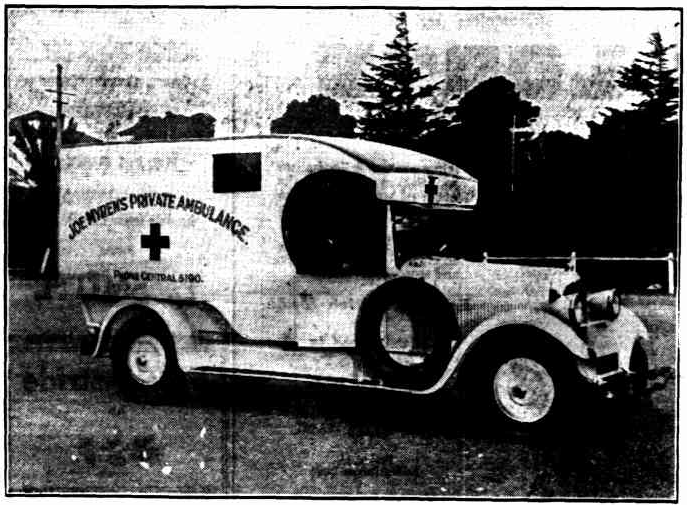
  Joe Myren's Private Ambulance 1927

In a ceremony at the St. John Ambulance Brigade annual review on Sunday 21 September 1952 metropolitan ambulance services in Adelaide (and later the country services) were formally merged to run by the St. John Council for South Australia Inc. which was part of St John Ambulance until 1993. Joe Myren's Private Ambulance was not merged immediately and continued to run independently until 1955 when the business and vehicle were sold to St. John for £500.

Through to the 1980s, the ambulance service in metropolitan Adelaide was staffed by volunteers at nights and weekends. After a series of industrial disputes from 1977 and parliamentary enquiries through the 1980s the service moved to a fully paid service in the metropolitan area by 1991 as well as major country centres, representing a huge shift in public opinion from the strong support of volunteerism in 1979.

SAAS came into being in 1993 as a result of the Ambulance Services Act 1992 which formed an association S.A. St. John Ambulance Service Inc as a joint venture between the Minister of Health and Priory in Australia of the Grand Priory of the Most Venerable Order of the Hospital of St. John of Jerusalem. The name of the association was amended to SA Ambulance Service Inc in 2005 and in 2008, SAAS became an agency under the Minister of Health.

== Organisation ==
SA Ambulance service is led by a CEO who is responsible to the South Australian Minister for Health and Wellbeing through the Department of Health and Wellbeing (SA Health).

- Chief Executive Officer (CEO)
  - Chief Medical Officer Provides clinical direction and oversight to SA Ambulance.
  - Executive Director, Operations (Metropolitan) is responsible for emergency and non-emergency Ambulance operations in the Adelaide Metropolitan area.
  - Executive Director Operations (Country) is responsible for emergency and non-emergency Ambulance operations in regional and rural South Australia
  - Executive Director, Clinical Services is responsible for clinical governance, patient safety, clinical development and clinical education units.
  - Executive Director Critical Services is responsible for the emergency operations centre, planning and resourcing, clinical hub, and operational systems.
  - Director, Strategy and Operational Reform
  - Executive Director Rescue, Retrieval and Aviation Services (RRAS) is responsible for special operations, rescue, retrieval and aviation operations.
  - Director Clinical Services SAAS MedSTAR is responsible for MedSTAR which includes SA Ambulance's critical care medical retrievals and MedSTAR Kids
  - Director Workforce is responsible for human resources, work place health and safety, industrial relations and workforce strategy and planning.
  - Executive Director Corporate Services is responsible for financial services, business services, ICT, fleet services and records.

== Ambulance types ==
SA Ambulance Service is known to operate a variety of emergency and non-emergency vehicles across the state, which travel in excess of 10 million kilometres each year. All vehicles have distinctive green, green cheque and yellow livery, high visibility LED lightbars and warning lights and sirens. Most SAAS Ambulance vans feature custom SA license plates starting with 'AMB' and then the fleet number of the vehicles, for example, an Ambulance with the fleet number 277 has the license plate 'AMB·277'.

=== Emergency Ambulances ===
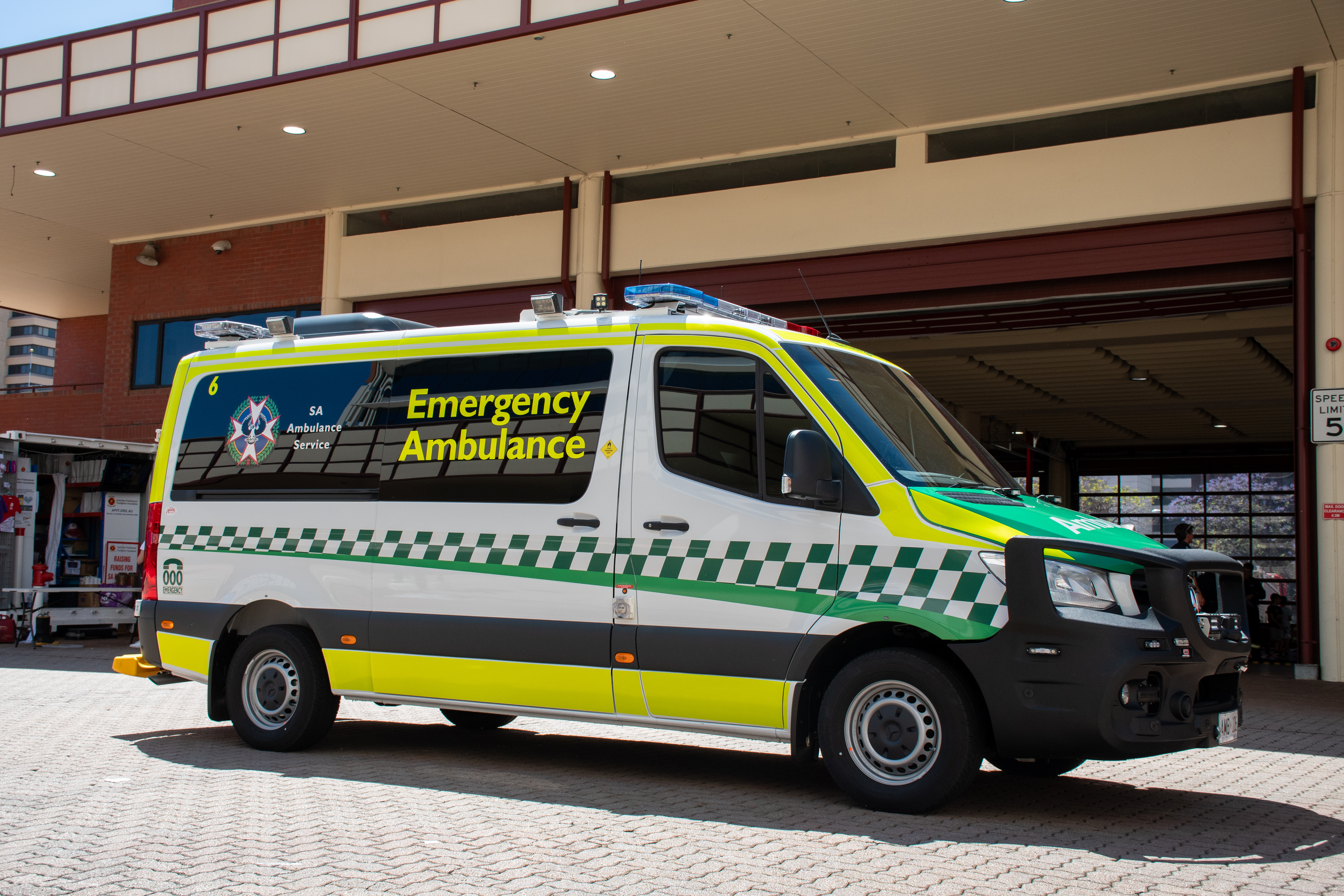
Emergency Ambulance

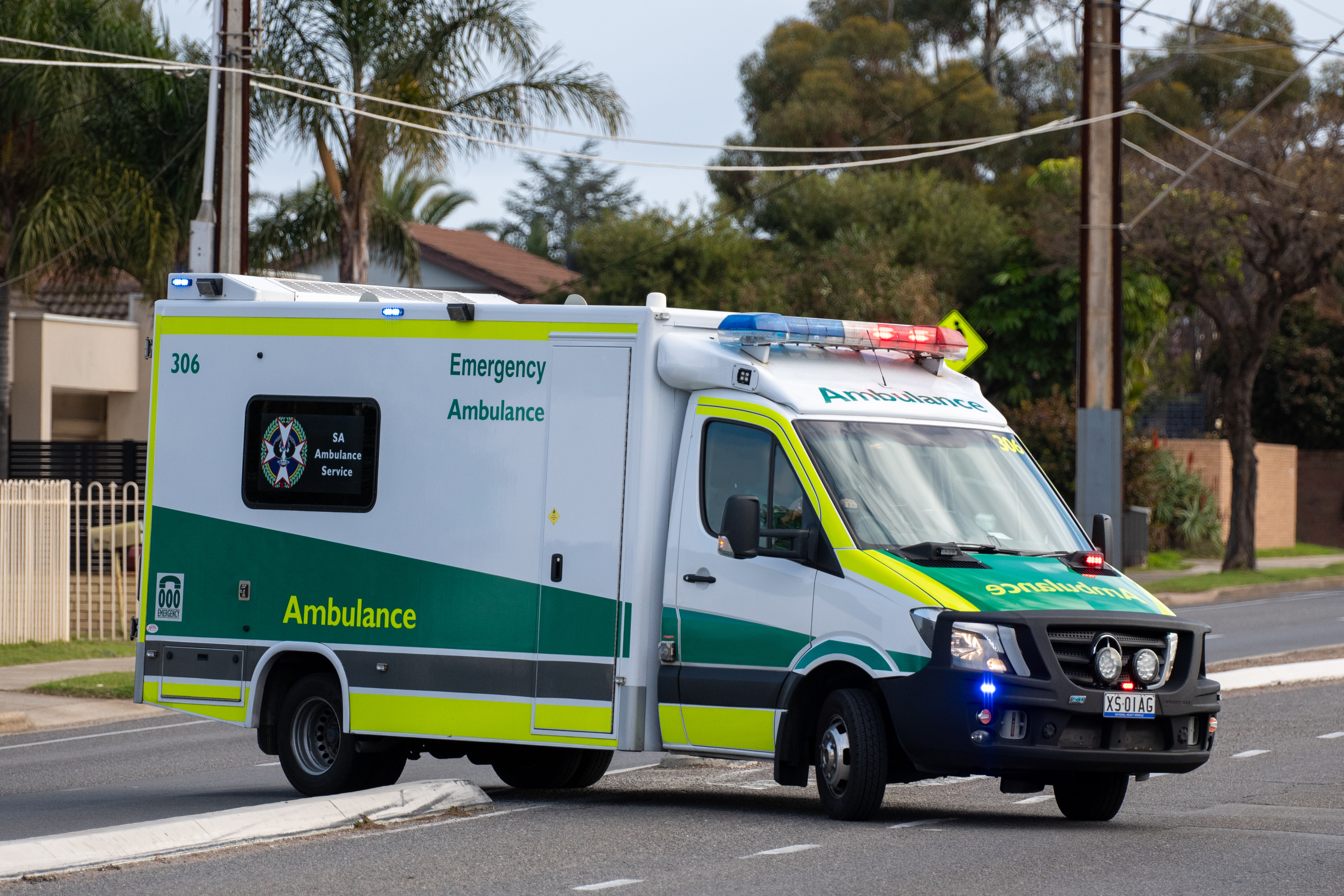
Bariatric Support Ambulance

SA Ambulance Service operates 270 Mercedes-Benz Sprinter Ambulances for use in metropolitan and regional areas, and 10 Toyota Landcruiser 70 series Ambulances for use in rural and remote areas. All salaried emergency ambulance crews rostered within the Adelaide metropolitan area and major country centres are skilled at least Paramedic level (3-year degree + 1-year internship) with numerous crews skilled at Intensive Care Paramedic level (3-year degree + 1-year internship + 2 years paramedic experience as a minimum + graduate diploma + an ICP internship). In smaller rural areas of South Australia approximately 1,200 Ambulance volunteers crew emergency ambulances and community response vehicles (station wagons/4 wheel drives). SAAS Clinical Education unit (a Registered Training Organisation) trains volunteer Ambulance Assists & Ambulance Responders to Nationally accredited Certificate II in Medical Service First Response and Ambulance Officers to Certificate IV in Health Care Level. The scope of practice and authorised skills of rural volunteers is considered the highest of all ambulance volunteers in Australia. In recent times volunteers have been credentialed to administered intranasal narcotics and controlled medications such as sublingual Ketamine.

SAAS is licensed to provide emergency ambulance services throughout South Australia. Emergency ambulances are also provided from some mining sites and by aeromedical providers including the Royal Flying Doctor Service

=== Patient Transport Service ===
Mercedes Benz Sprinter Ambulances are used by both the Patient Transport Service (PTS) and Emergency Support Service (ESS) crews. PTS and ESS Ambulance Officers are trained via the SAAS Clinical Education unit (a Registered Training Organisation) To the Nationally Accredited Certificate IV in Health Care qualification.

SA Ambulance has a Mercedes Benz Sprinter bariatric transport ambulance.

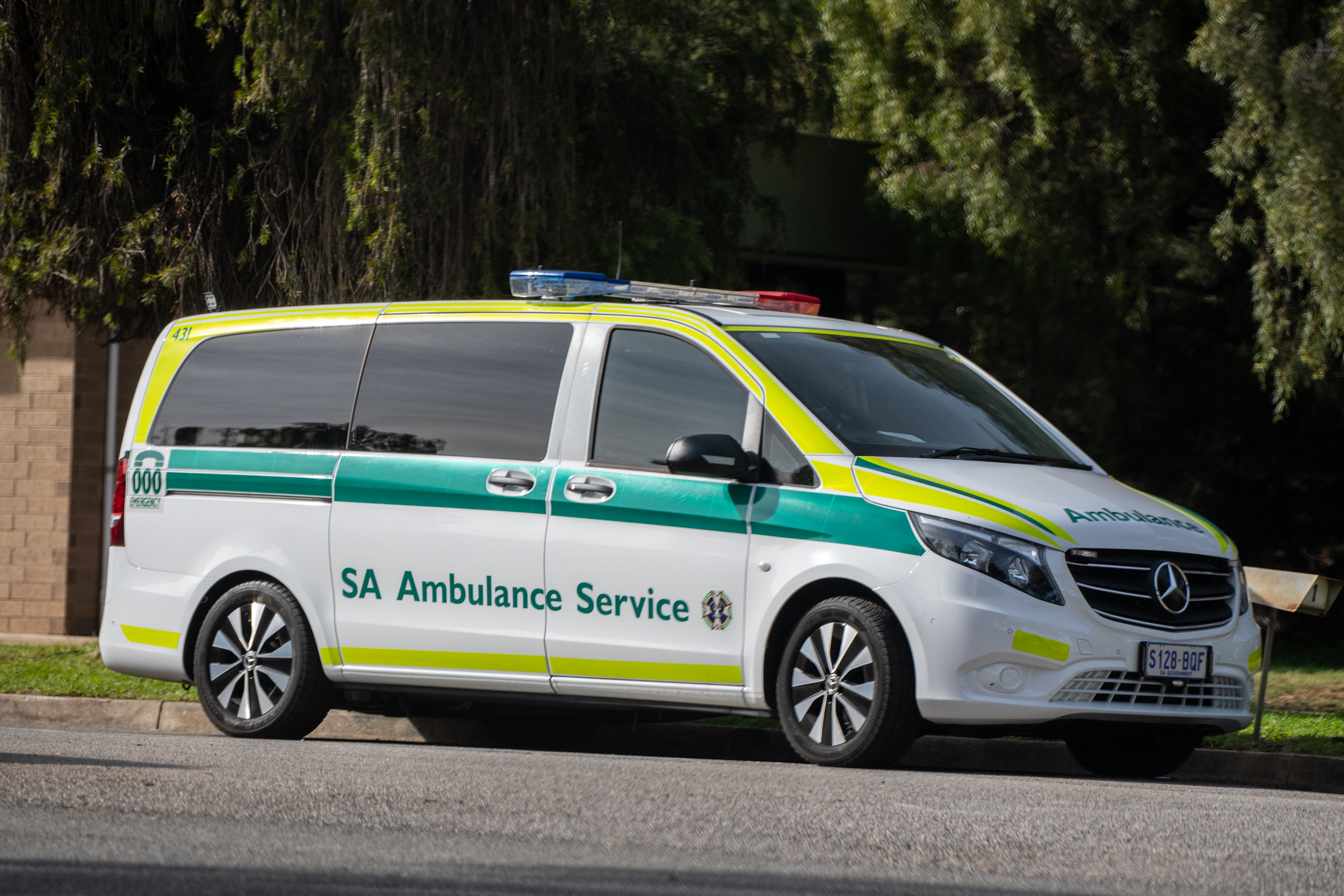
Extended Care Paramedic Mercedes Benz Valente

=== Extended Care Paramedics ===
SAAS also operate a team of Extended Care Paramedics, who operate from Mercedes Valente vans. Unlike regular paramedics, ECPs are able to treat patients for common medical issues, and refer to other health providers such as GPs if needed, reducing the need to transport patients to hospital emergency departments unnecessarily.

=== SPRINT (Single Paramedic Response and INTervention) ===
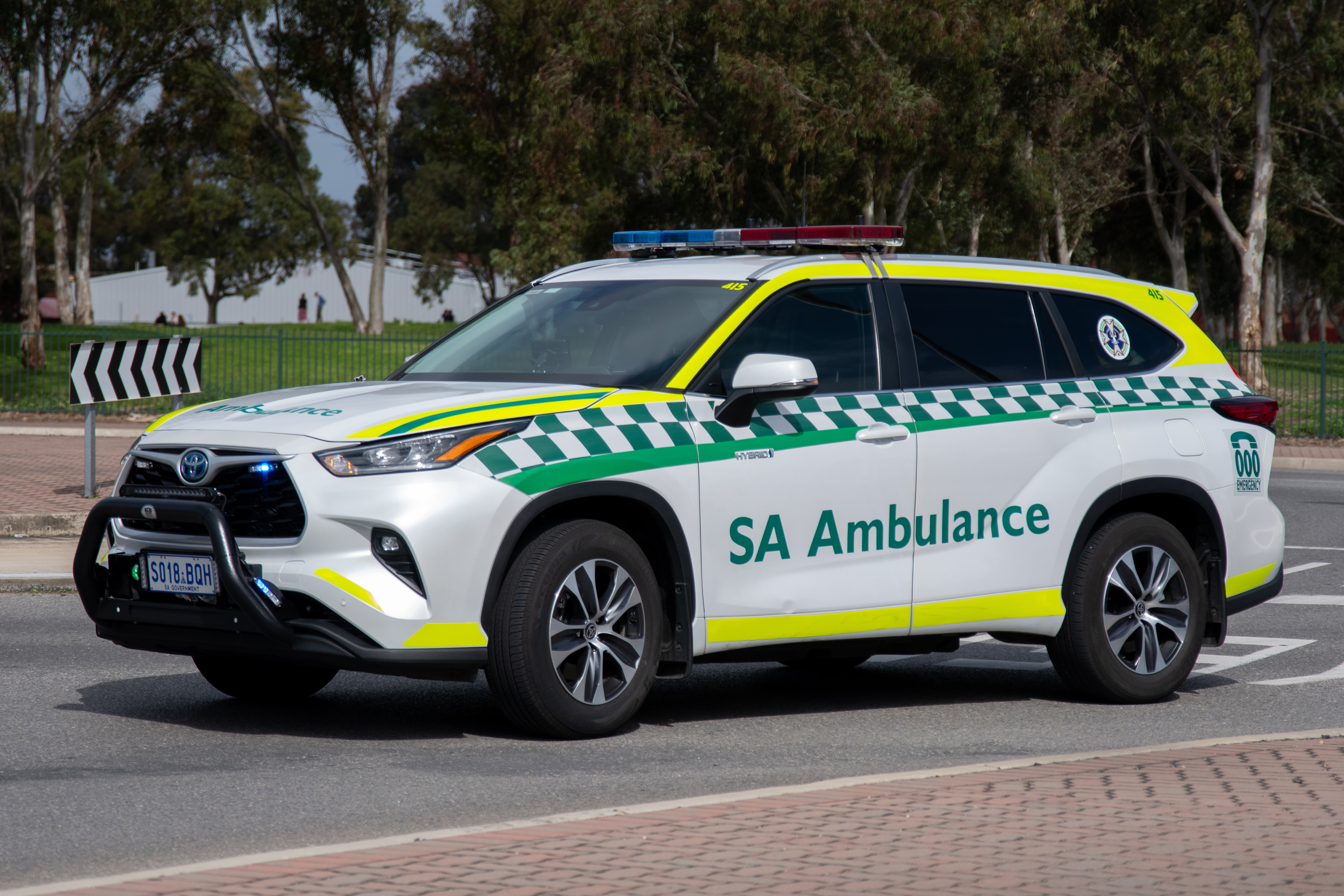
SA Ambulance Sprint Car

SPRINT Paramedics are in the process of replacing their 12 Volkswagen Tiguan Allspace 162TSI vehicles with the Toyota Kluger GXL, rapid response purposes within the Adelaide metropolitan area.

=== SPRINT Bicycles (BRU) ===
SPRINT paramedics also utilise bicycles at major events where heavy pedestrian traffic may reduce response times for larger vehicles. The crews may help guide ambulances through busy areas, and carry limited medical equipment including oxygen and a defibrillator.

=== Special Operations Team (SOT) ===
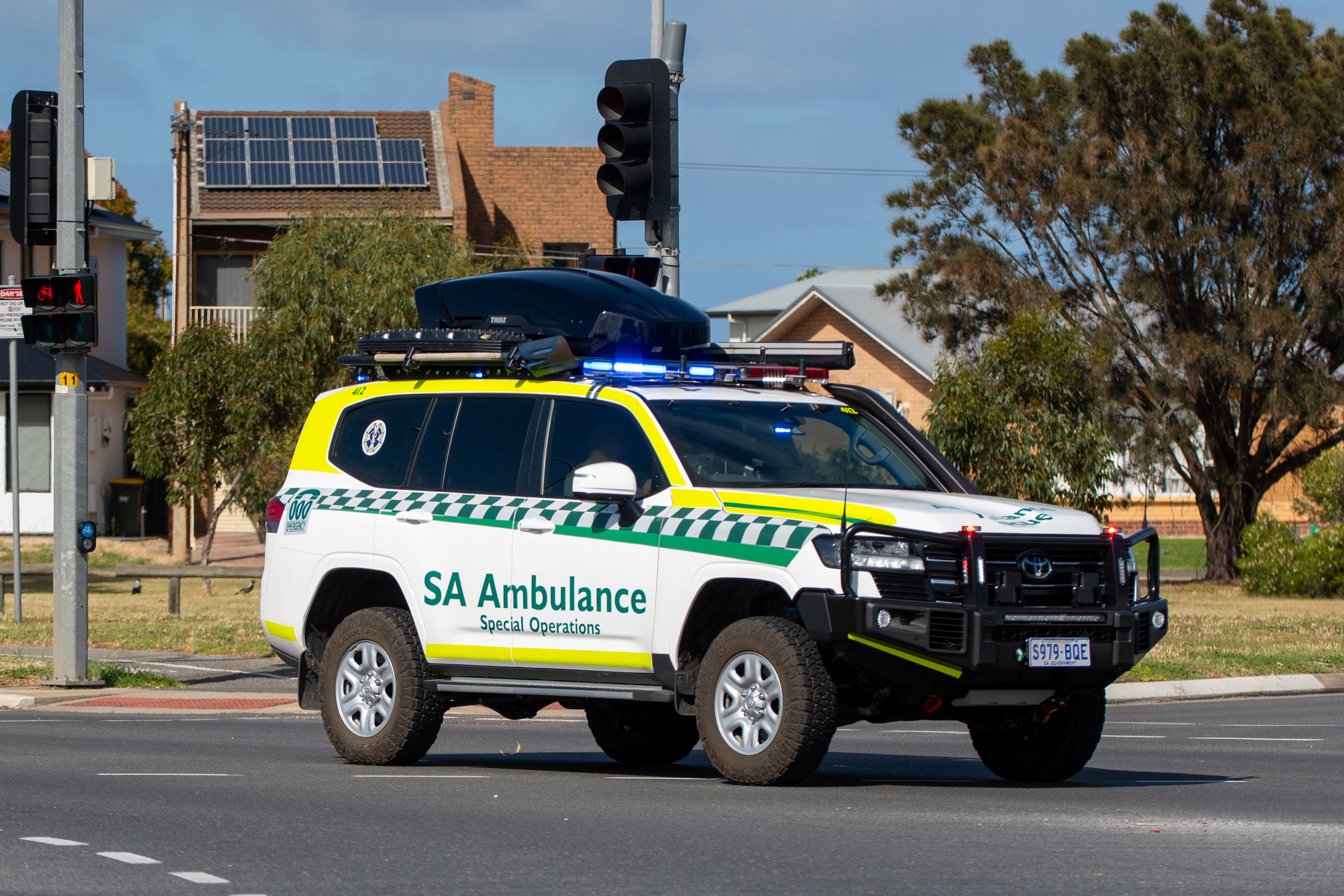
Special Operations Fleet 412

The Special Operations Team use Toyota Landcruiser 4WD vehicles and a purpose-built Mercedes Sprinter rescue support vehicle when performing the SOT responder role.

An Isuzu 16-tonne Tactical Support Vehicle is used as a command vehicle for major incidents and planned events, this is operated out of the Rescue, Retrieval and Aviation Services base at Adelaide Airport and staffed by Special Operations Paramedics.

=== Management & Operational Command Vehicles ===
In metropolitan Adelaide, Clinical Team Leaders are currently using a mix of Holden Trailblazer and Toyota Kluger GX and GXLs. The Holden Trailblazers are in the process of being replaced with the Toyota Kluger GXL.

Operation Managers have a mix of vehicles, most common are the Toyota RAV4 and Kia Sorento.

Outside of Adelaide, Regional Team Leaders are also in the process of having their vehicles replaced, most commonly with the Isuzu MU-X or Ford Everest while Country Operation Managers are using a mix of vehicles including the Toyota Land Cruiser GXL, Toyota Prado, Ford Everest, Ford Ranger and Isuzu MU-X.

SA Ambulance services also has Fuso Canter trucks for logistics.

=== Airwing ===
SAAS are the controlling authority for the five Babcock Rescue Helicopters (1 EC 130 and 4 Bell 412), for the use of roadside trauma response, medical retrievals, training exercises and SAPOL, CFS and SES operations. The Royal Flying Doctor Service operates a number of Pilatus PC12 aircraft performing inter-hospital transfers from regional area and first response ambulance service in remote areas.

== Special Operations Team ==
Special Operations Team (SOT) rescue paramedics are trained in high-risk rescue procedures. They work closely with other emergency services and the South Australian Police STAR Group. SOT Paramedics also cycle through the MedSTAR retrieval service.

== Communications ==
The SAAS Emergency Operations Centre (EOC), based in Eastwood, Adelaide, primarily answers emergency triple-zero (000) calls using the MPDS dispatch system. The EOC coordinates SA Ambulance Service resources. The EOC also coordinates the dispatch of the Rescue Helicopter Service and MedSTAR Retrieval Service. Emergency medical dispatch support officers (EMDSO) coordinate calls from the Divers Emergency Service and the SA Trauma Service.

Communications between paramedics and the EOC is conducted primarily through Mobile Data Terminals and SA GRN pagers and radios, but mobile phones may also be used in some circumstances.

== See also ==
- Ambulance
- Paramedic
- 000 Emergency
