= SA Health =

Health system of South Australia

Department for Health and Wellbeing

Department overview
- Formed: 2018
- Preceding agencies: Department of Health and Ageing (2012-2018); Department of Health (2004-2012); Health Commission (1978-2008); Department of Public Health (1951-1978); Hospitals Department (1940-1978)
- Jurisdiction: South Australia
- Headquarters: Citi Centre Building, 11 Hindmarsh Square, Adelaide
- Employees: 46,099 (SA Health) / 1650 (DHW specifically)
- Annual budget: $7.7 billion (2022-2023) (SA Health)
- Minister responsible: Blair Boyer, Minister for Health and Wellbeing
- Department executive: Dr Robyn Lawrence, Chief Executive
- Website: www.sahealth.sa.gov.au

SA Health is the brand name for the portfolio of South Australian government departments and agencies administered by the South Australian Government, and are responsible for delivering health and medical services for the state. The Department for Health and Wellbeing is the principal institution that falls under the SA Health portfolio and is responsible for the direction of the portfolio. These bodies are overseen by the South Australian Minister for Health and Wellbeing, currently Blair Boyer.

== History of the Health Portfolio ==
The first body in South Australia responsible for public health was the Colonial Surgeon's Office, which was established in 1835, though the first Colonial Surgeon did not arrive in the colony until 1837. The Colonial Surgeon was responsible for sanitation, public hospitals and those interred in asylums.

In 1873 the Central Board of Health was established to oversee vaccinations, regulation of slaughterhouses, waste disposal and drains, as well as managing outbreaks of infectious diseases.

In 1914, the Colonial Surgeon's Office was abolished and replaced with the Inspector General of Hospitals, to oversee the operation of hospitals and asylums. This role was then taken over by the Hospitals Department which replaced the Inspector General in 1940.

In 1951 the South Australian Government created the Department of Public Health, which was merged with the Central Board of Health. The new department was to be responsible for infectious diseases and ran alongside the Hospitals Department.

In 1978, both the Hospitals Department and the Department of Public Health were merged to create the South Australian Health Commission to oversee both the management of infectious disease and the administration public hospitals and mental institutions. However some medical functions remained with the Department of Human Services.

The remaining responsibilities under the Department of Human Services were transferred to a re-established Department of Health in 2004, which absorbed the Health Commission in 2008.

In 2012, the department was renamed the Department of Health and Ageing when the Office of Ageing was transferred from the Department for Families and Communities. The Department of Health and Ageing was responsible for the creation and implementation of health policy, as well as mental health, public health and the administration of hospitals.

The department was renamed to the Department for Health and Wellbeing in 2018.

== Bodies under SA Health ==
=== Department for Health and Wellbeing ===
The department is the central decision-making body of SA Health and assists the minister in setting health policy and monitoring the state's health services. The head of the department is the Chief Executive which manages seven divisions, which in turn may be divided into further subdivisions. The Chief Executive oversees the management of the SA Ambulance Service

=== Local Health Networks ===
The administration of public hospitals and other facilities in South Australia is overseen by a variety of Local Health Networks (LHNs) which either oversees a particular issue or a geographic area. Each LHN is overseen by a Governing Board which manages its budget and appoints a chief executive officer to manage the day-to-day operations and management of the LHNs. The chief executive officer is accountable its respective governing board, which then in turn is responsible to the Minister and the Department for Health and Wellbeing.

=== Preventative Health SA ===
Preventative Health SA is an attached agency of SA Health. In 2024 it was created to replace Wellbeing SA and focuses on delivering preventative health measures in areas such as obesity, vaping, smoking, alcohol and other drugs, suicide and mental health.

=== Commission on Excellence and Innovation in Health ===
The Commission on Excellence and Innovation in Health is an attached agency of SA Health which foucuses on innovation in health and bettering patient outcomes.

== Structure of the Department for Health ==
=== Chief Executive ===
- Office of the Chief Executive
  - Executive Services
  - Corporate Correspondence
  - Corporate Communications
- SA Ambulance Service

==== Public health ====
- Health Protection and Regulation
  - Clinical Regulation Branch
    - Drugs of Dependence Unit (DDU)
    - Clinical Regulation Policy and Licensing Team (CRPL)
  - Compliance Branch
  - Food Safety and Regulation Branch
  - Health Protection Branch
  - Scientific Services Branch
  - Office of Health Protection and Regulation
- Communicable Disease Control Branch
- Public Health Planning and Response

==== Strategy and Governance ====
- Aboriginal Health
- Strategy and Intergovernment Relations
- Office for Ageing Well
- Child Protection and Policy
- Governance Advisory Services
- Mental Health Strategy
- Drug and Alcohol Services South Australia (DASSA)

==== Clinical System Support and Improvement ====
- Chief Medical Officer
- Chief Nurse and Midwifery Officer
- Chief Allied and Scientific Health Officer
- Chief Pharmacist
- Health Services Programs
- SA Virtual Care Service and State Coordination Centre
- Integrated Care Systems
- Safety and Quality
- Implementation Science Unit
- System Access and Capacity

==== Commissioning and Performance ====
- Performance and Contracts
- Activity Based Management and Funding
- Planning and Commissioning
- Data, Analytics and Insights
  - Data Services and Projects
  - Data Assets
  - Data Governance and Reporting
  - Health Analytics and Insights
  - SA NT DataLink

==== Corporate Services ====
- Finance
- Infrastructure
- Procurement and Supply Chain
- Management
- Workforce Services
- Corporate Projects
- New Women's and Children's Hospital Project Office

==== Digital Health SA ====
- Business Transformation
- Technology and Infrastructure
- Strategy and Architecture
- Clinical Information System Reform
- Business Performance Operational Services
- Chief Medical Information Officer
- Sunrise EMR

== Local Health Networks ==
There are currently 10 Local Health Networks established under the Health Care Act 2008. 9 LHNs oversee geographic areas of the state, while the Women's and Children's Health Network (WCHN) provides specialised health services for women, young people and children. The other 9 LHNs are:

- Barossa Hills Fleurieu Local Health Network (BHFLHN)
- Central Adelaide Local Health Network (CALLHN)
- Eyre and Far North Local Health Network (EFNLHN)
- Flinders and Upper North Local Health Network (FUNLHN)
- Limestone Coast Local Health Network (LCLHN)
- Northern Adelaide Local Health Network (NALHN)
- Riverland Mallee Coorong Local Health Network (RMCLHN)
- Southern Adelaide Local Health Network (SALHN)
- Yorke and Northern Local Health Network (YNLHN)

== See also ==
- Government of South Australia
- List of South Australian government agencies
