= Stewart Cockburn =

Australian journalist and author

- Born: Alexander Stewart Cockburn; 1921; Adelaide, South Australia
- Died: 2009 (aged 87–88)
- Occupations: Journalist, author
- Spouses: Beatrice Ferguson (m. 1947; died 1986) Jennifer Cashmore (m. 1988; died 2024)
- Children: 4
- Parents: Rodney Cockburn (father); Ruby Ethel Cockburn (née Adams) (mother)
- Awards: Walkley Award (1972, Best newspaper feature story)

Alexander Stewart Cockburn AM (1921–2009) was an Australian journalist, commentator, and author from Adelaide, South Australia.

== Early life and education ==
Alexander Stewart Cockburn was born in 1921. He was the only child of journalist Rodney Cockburn and his second wife, Ruby Ethel, née Adams. (Her first husband, Lieut. Melville Farmer, was killed in action in World War I.) Cockburn was about to turn eleven years old when his father died.

Educated at Scotch College, Adelaide, he left school at sixteen after earning his Leaving Certificate.

== Career ==
Cockburn began working as a copy boy for The Advertiser in 1938, and started his reporter cadetship late in 1940. During the war years he was one of the few young men working as a reporter at The Advertiser, as he had been rejected as medically unfit after volunteering for service with the Royal Australian Navy: he had tubercular scars on his lungs, the affliction that had decimated his father's family. (He was accredited as one of three Advertiser war correspondents for the Pacific region in 1943, but did not obtain the paper's approval for this work. He was needed on the short-staffed paper in Adelaide. While still a cadet reporter, Cockburn obtained valuable early experience in the Canberra Press Gallery on behalf of the paper.

He transferred to the associated Melbourne Herald in 1945, after the war ended. For a time he worked as a Herald correspondent in Canberra and in London for the Herald and Reuters news agency. While in London he came to the attention of then-Liberal Opposition Leader Robert Menzies.

He was personally selected by Prime Minister Menzies in 1951 as his press secretary, and accompanied the P.M. on his 1952 official visit to London and Washington. He accompanied Menzies and his family to London in 1953 for the Coronation of Elizabeth II. Soon after his return he took three months' sick leave and then resigned from the press secretary position due to a flare-up of his dormant Tuberculosis. He wrote about his three year experience in a series of articles in The Bulletin. and for The Herald. His replacement, Hugh Dash, served as Menzies' press secretary until 1960, when he unexpectedly died.

Cockburn returned to The Advertiser in early 1954 as a special feature writer. During the 1950s he also became a regular radio news commentator on 5AD and was a member of the Meet the Press panel on TV Channel ADS7. Between 1955 and 1983, except when living interstate or overseas, he was the South Australian correspondent for Canberra Times.

Cockburn covered the 1959 Royal Commission into the trial of Aboriginal murderer Rupert Maxwell Stuart largely instigated by campaigning journalist Rohan Rivett. Unlike Rivett, Cockburn was convinced of Stuart's guilt.

From 1961 to 1963 he worked as press attaché to the Australian Embassy in Washington. He resigned and returned to Australia and The Advertiser after voicing his doubts about the veracity of a public statement made by the Australian ambassador.

In 1964 he read the evening news bulletin on ADS7, the TV station then associated with The Advertiser. Cockburn continued as senior feature writer at The Advertiser and resumed his radio commentaries on 5AD and also on 5AN. After participating in a journalists' strike in 1967, Cockburn left journalism for several years. He and his family moved to Canberra, where he was partner in a news agency service.

Cockburn returned to journalism and The Advertiser in 1971. In addition to feature writing, he wrote opinion columns and was a leader (editorial) writer.

Towards the end of 1971 Cockburn investigated the company behind Holiday Magic cosmetics, and showed how a small number of operators profited enormously from the aspirations of a large number of agents, a classic pyramid scheme. His series of articles earned him a national Walkley Award for the best newspaper feature story in 1972.

In January 1979 Cockburn received a letter written in jail by inmate Edward Splatt, protesting his innocence of the 1977 murder of 77-year-old Rosa Amelia Simper. Cockburn's crusade on Splatt's behalf led to the then longest Royal Commission (1983–1984) in SA history, with Michael Abbott QC representing Splatt, and led to an overturned verdict, release in October 1984, and monetary compensation for Splatt.

In 1979 Cockburn published The Salisbury Affair on the sacking by premier Don Dunstan of South Australian Police Commissioner, Harold Salisbury. The book sold well and its release was closely followed by the defeat of the state Labor government under Des Corcoran in September 1979, Dunstan having retired in February.

He followed this success with biographies of Mark Oliphant, nuclear scientist and Governor of South Australia 1971–1976 (with David Ellyard) and of South Australian Premier Thomas Playford, with assistance from John Playford (1935–2003), a distant relative (see Family of Thomas Playford I). The Oliphant biography won the historical and biographical section of the SA Government 1982 biennial prize for literature.

Cockburn published a revised edition of his father's book on South Australian placenames as What's in a name?, criticised by Geoff Manning, author of a similar publication, for its errors and omissions.

Cockburn donated a substantial collection of ephemera related to his career, including several scrapbooks, to the University of Adelaide which includes audio cassettes, letters and press clippings.

== Recognition ==
- Robert Menzies dubbed him "Atlas", for "always having the worries of the world on his shoulders"
- He was made a Member of the Order of Australia (AM) in the 1995 Australia Day Honours "for service to journalism and literature"
- Cockburn received two Walkley Awards: in 1972, for the best newspaper feature story, a five-part series of articles on Holiday Magic, a pyramid selling company; and in 1982, a commendation for his series of articles on the Splatt case.

== Personal life ==
Cockburn married Beatrice Ferguson (from Tasmania) in England in 1947. They had four children, Carol, Jenny, Kirsty and Malcolm.

Beatrice died in 1986, and he later married former politician Jennifer Cashmore, becoming step-father to her two daughters, NSW Supreme Court judge Christine Adamson and former diplomat and later governor of South Australia Frances Adamson.

Cockburn died in 2009.

== Bibliography ==
- Stewart Cockburn, David Ellyard - Oliphant, the Life and Times of Sir Mark Oliphant - Axiom Books, 1981
- Stewart Cockburn - The Patriarchs - Ferguson Publications, 1983. A compilation of 30 profiles from his columns in The Advertiser)
- Rodney Cockburn and Stewart Cockburn - What’s in a Name: nomenclature of South Australia - Ferguson Publications, 1984. ISBN 095925191X (revised edition of Rodney Cockburn’s Nomenclature of South Australia, edited from his father’s 1932 manuscript revision)
- Stewart Cockburn assisted by John Playford - Playford: benevolent despot - Axiom, 1991.
- Stewart Cockburn - Notable Lives: profiles of 21 South Australians - Ferguson Publications, 1997. Another compilation from his columns in The Advertiser
