= Walford Anglican School for Girls =

School in Hyde Park, South Australia

Coordinates: 34°57′26″S 138°36′28″E

- Hyde Park, South Australia; Australia

Information
- Type: Independent, single-sex, day & boarding
- Motto: Latin: Virtute et Veritate (Courage and Truth)
- Denomination: Anglican
- Established: 1893
- Founder: Lydia Adamson
- Chairman: Peter Hastings
- Principal: Dr Deborah Netolicky
- Staff: ~70
- Grades: ELC–12
- Enrolment: ~450 (2024)
- Colours: Navy blue, light blue & gold
- Affiliation: Independent Girls Schools Sports Association
- Website: www.walford.sa.edu.au/

Walford Anglican School for Girls is an independent, Anglican, day and boarding school for girls, located in Hyde Park, South Australia. The school is non-selective and caters for approximately 550 students from ELC to Year 12, including 65 boarders. Walford's motto is "Virtute et Veritate" which translates to "Moral Courage and Truth".

Walford offers the International Baccalaureate (IB) Primary Years Programme in the Junior School the SACE program in the Senior School.

== History ==
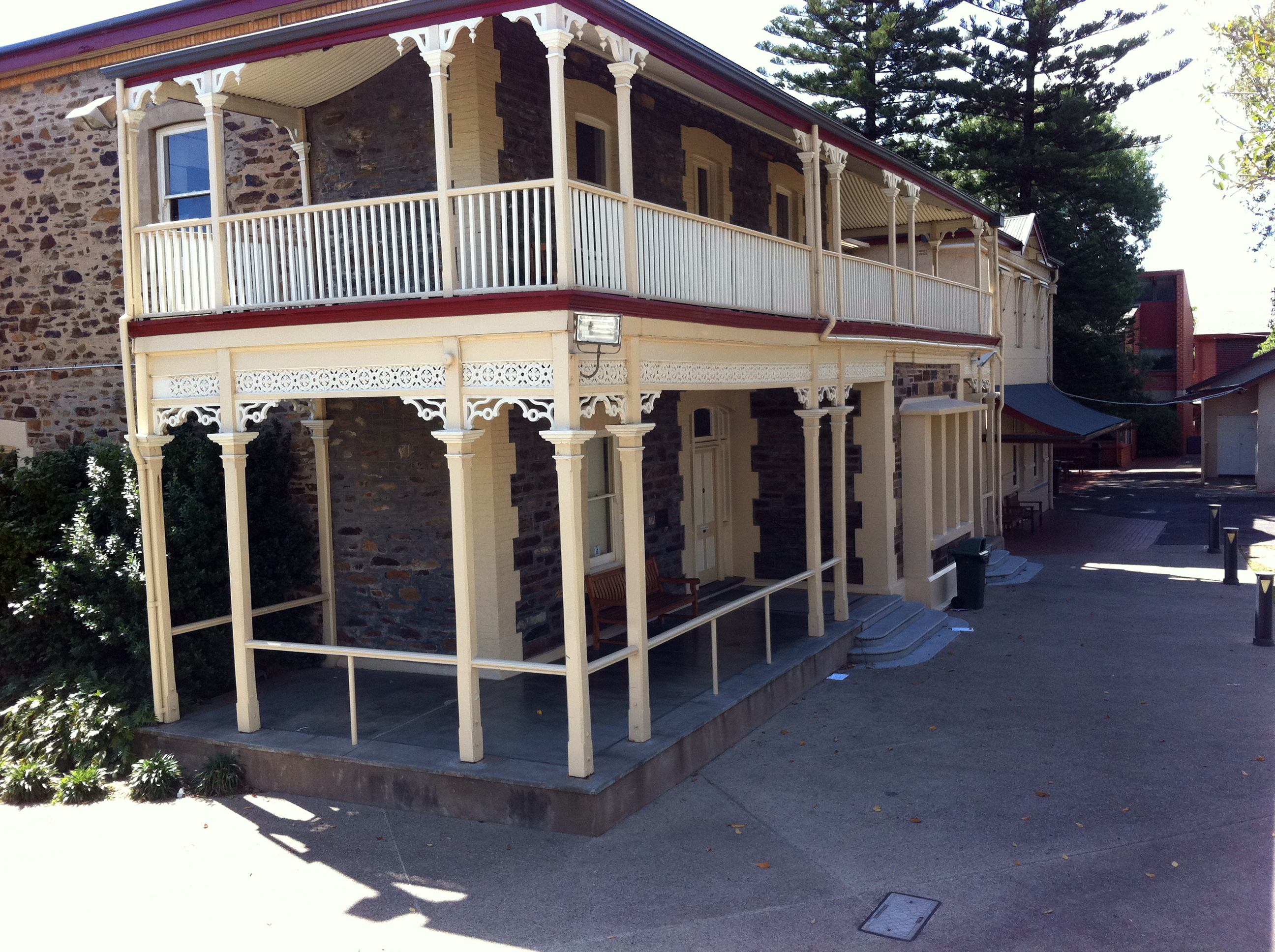
Mabel Jewell Baker House, original boarding house

The school started in 1893 in Fisher Street, Malvern, in the home of the first headmistress, Lydia Adamson. In December 1912 Ellen Ida Benham purchased the school, and led it until her death in 1917. Mabel Jewell Baker, a senior teacher at the school took over as headmistress. In 1920 boarders were housed in a new property in Hyde Park, and later the school itself moved to this site. When Baker retired at the end of 1955 there were 450 students and a well-established boarding house.

In 1956 Walford was incorporated as a Church of England Girls' Grammar School and Nina Morrison, OBE became the first salaried headmistress. She was followed by Helen Reid AM (1972–1991) and then Marilyn Haysom (1992–2004).

In May 2004 Helen Trebilcock become the first Head of Walford to use the title of Principal, followed by Rebecca Clarke (2012-2022) and Dr Deborah Netolicky in 2023.

In 2025, Walford introduced an all-seasons uniform.

In 2024 Walford was an Excellence Awardee in the Australian Education Awards in the categories of Boarding School of the Year and Principal of the Year - Non-Government. In 2025, the school was an Excellence Awardee in the Australian Education Awards in the category of Secondary School of the Year - Non-Government.

== Sport ==
Walford is a member of the Independent Girls Schools Sports Association (IGSSA).

=== IGSSA premierships ===
Walford has won the following IGSSA premierships.

- Athletics (2) – 2004, 2006
- Basketball (3) – 1993, 1994, 2007
- Hockey (4) – 1978, 2014, 2015, 2016
- Soccer – 2020
- Swimming (2) – 2008, 2009
- Tennis (10) – 2003, 2007, 2008, 2009, 2010, 2011, 2012, 2013, 2014, 2015
- Volleyball (2) – 2002, 2006

Walford has won the South Australian Head of the River 'Florence Eaton Cup' for Winners of the Girls First Eight 19 times, in 1991, 1992, 1993, 1994, 1995, 1997, 1999, 2002, 2004, 2007, 2008, 2010, 2011, 2012, 2013, 2014, 2017, 2018 and 2022.

== Notable alumnae ==
- Christine Adamson – Justice of the Supreme Court of New South Wales
- Frances Adamson – Governor of South Australia, previously Secretary, Australian Department of Foreign Affairs and Trade, and Australian Ambassador to China.
- Doreen Bridges, AM – music education researcher
- Jennifer Cashmore – MHA of the South Australian State Parliament Her sisters Margaret, Helen, Nancy, and Gillian were prize-winning students. Cashmore was mother of the Adamson girls.
- Taasha Coates – singer, songwriter and member of the band The Audreys
- Constance Margaret Eardley – botanist at the University of Adelaide
- Isobel Marshall – 2021 Young Australian of the Year
- Jenna McCormick – professional soccer player and Australian Rules footballer
- Margaret Clunies Ross – Professor of English Literature at the University of Sydney
- Pamela Sykes – molecular geneticist. Founding fellow of the Faculty of Science in the Royal College of pathologists of Australia
- Ann Vanstone – Independent Commission Against Corruption (South Australia)
- Danielle Wood — economist and Chair of the Productivity Commission
- Ann Woolcock – Professor of Respiratory Medicine at the University of Sydney

== See also ==
- List of schools in South Australia
- List of boarding schools
- Head of the River (Australia)
- Anglican Church of Australia
