= James Muecke =

Australian ophthalmologist (born 1963)

James Muecke AM

Lieutenant Governor of South Australia
- In office 27 January 2022 – 9 February 2024
- Governor: Frances Adamson
- Preceded by: Brenda Wilson
- Succeeded by: Richard Harris

Personal details
- Born: James Sunter Muecke Adelaide, South Australia
- Education: University of Adelaide
- Awards: 2020 Australian of the Year; 2020 South Australian of the Year
- Medical career
- Profession: Medical specialist
- Sub-specialties: Ophthalmologist

James Sunter Muecke AM CM (born 1963) is an Australian ophthalmologist working in Adelaide, South Australia. He was the 2020 Australian of the Year, having been South Australian of the Year. He was sworn in as South Australia's Lieutenant Governor on 27 January 2022, succeeding Brenda Wilson, and was succeeded by Richard Harris.

== Early life ==
Muecke was born in Adelaide and raised in Canberra. He lived in Washington, D.C., as a child while his father worked for the Australian embassy. He attended Canberra Grammar School from 1976 to 1981. After failing to get into medicine at the University of Sydney by one mark, Muecke returned to Adelaide to study medicine at the University of Adelaide, graduating in 1987. He later trained as an ophthalmologist at the Royal Adelaide Hospital and subspecialty training in eye cancer in London

== Professional life ==
Muecke began his career working in Kenya for 12 months. After his ophthalmology training, he worked for a year at Saint John Eye Hospital in Jerusalem, including taking "outreach eye clinics" into refugee camps in the West Bank and Gaza Strip. He returned to South Australia and became an eye surgeon, working in private practice and as a visiting consultant at the Royal Adelaide and Women's and Children's Hospitals.

In 2000, Muecke founded Vision Myanmar at the South Australian Institute of Ophthalmology. In 2008, this evolved into Sight For All, a social impact organisation dedicated to fighting the causes of blindness with projects in Aboriginal and mainstream Australian communities, as well as training and equipping eye surgeons throughout Africa and Asia. Muecke is Chair and co-founder of Sight for All. Working with AusAID funding and the co-operation of both country's governments, Muecke created a program to create more than 30 specialist eye centres in Myanmar to treat cataract blindness.

In the 2012 Queen's Birthday Honours, Muecke was appointed a Member of the Order of Australia (AM). He received the University of Adelaide's Vice-Chancellor's Alumni Award in 2019.

In November 2019, Muecke was named South Australian of the Year for 2020. In January 2020, he was named Australian of the Year for his work in preventing blindness. He had planned to speak at events around the country throughout the year, but the COVID-19 pandemic meant most of his presentations outside Adelaide were delivered online.

On being appointed Australian of the Year, Muecke immediately advocated for a tax on sugary drinks in the fight against Type 2 diabetes, which is the leading cause of blindness among Australian adults. He advocated for TV commercials for unhealthy products to be limited to certain hours, and asks supermarket chains to curb their "predatory sales and marketing tactics", without success. Australia Post did remove junk food from their checkouts following a meeting with him. In late November 2020, he gave a controversial speech to the National Press Club outlining what he described as the country's "flawed, biased and unscientific" Australian Dietary Guidelines. He also brought his concerns to the Health Minister Greg Hunt. He was credited by Hunt in the launching of a new ten-year National Diabetes Plan in November 2021. Muecke is also a key contributor to Australian Community Media's "Silent Assassin" series on the causes and consequences of Australia's type 2 diabetes epidemic.

In 2016, Muecke had to stop conducting surgeries due to an inherited neurological condition (focal dystonia) impacting use of his right hand.

On 20 January 2022, the Premier of South Australia, Steven Marshall, announced that Muecke would be the state's new Lieutenant Governor, succeeding Brenda Wilson. The role is appointed for a term at the "Governor's pleasure" and acts as vice-regal representative in the Governor's absence.

== Awards and honours ==
- Outstanding Service in Prevention of Blindness Award, Asia-Pacific Academy of Ophthalmology, 2011
- Member of the Order of Australia, 2012
- South Australian Community Achievement Award, 2021
- Australian Medical Association President's Leadership Award, 2013
- Pride of Australia Medal finalist, 2014
- Ernst & Young Social Entrepreneur of the Year Award, 2015
- University of Adelaide Distinguished Alumni-Vice Chancellor's Award, 2019
- 2020 South Australian of the Year
- 2020 Australian of the Year
- Honorary Doctorate, University of Adelaide, 2021

== Personal life ==
Muecke is married to Mena, a former architect who is Sight for All's events director, and they have two sons. He is a keen amateur photographer and has held exhibitions and self-published a coffee table book, which helped fund a children's eye unit in Myanmar.
