= Geoff Raby =

Australian economist and diplomat (born 1953)

Geoff Raby AO
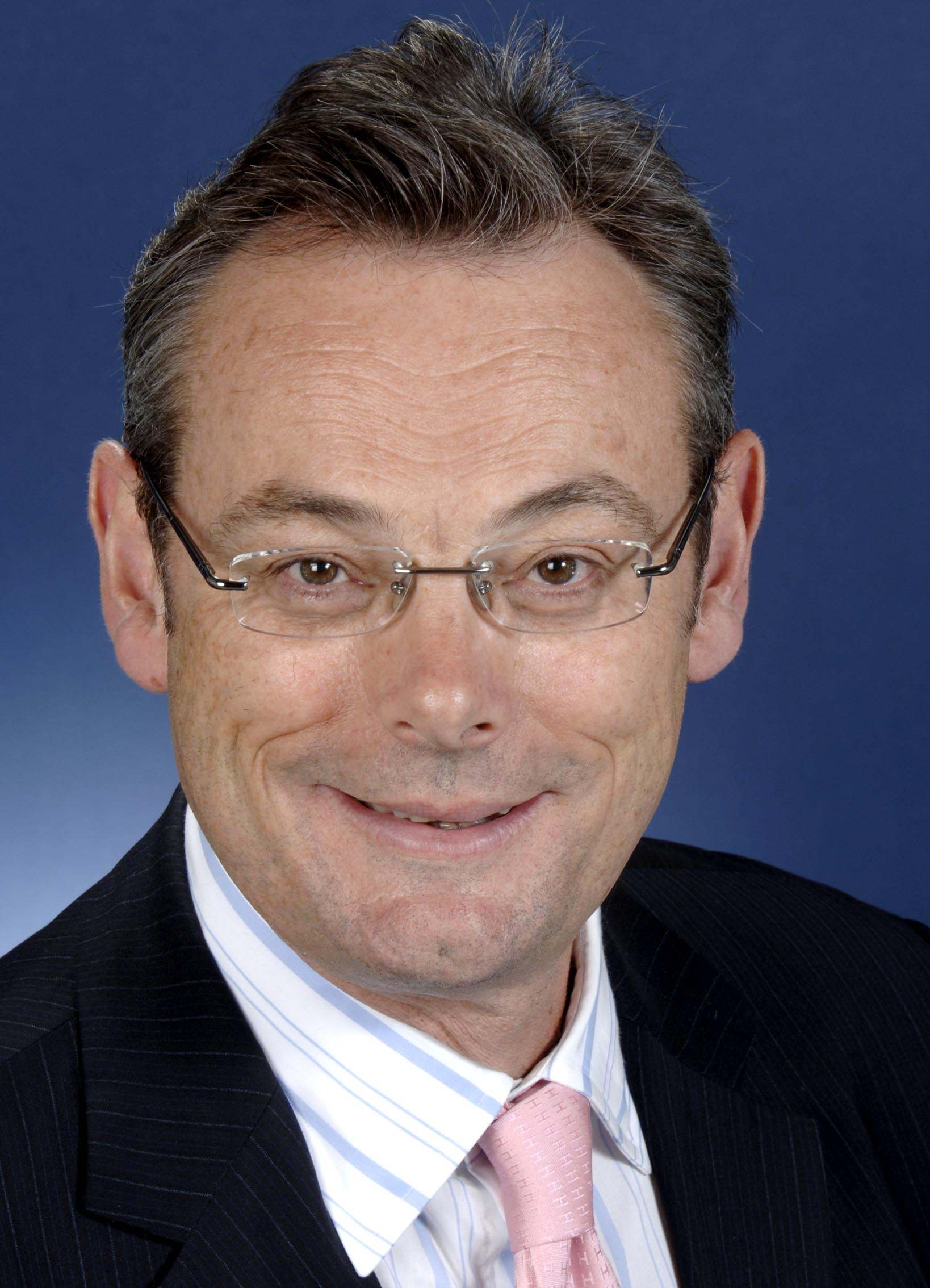
- Born: September 1953 (age 73); Melbourne, Australia
- Education: La Trobe University
- Occupations: Economist and diplomat
- Title: Australian Ambassador to China
- Term: 2007–2011
- Predecessor: Alan Thomas
- Successor: Frances Adamson

Geoffrey William "Geoff" Raby AO (born September 1953 in Melbourne) is an Australian economist and diplomat. He served as the Australian Ambassador to the People's Republic of China from February 2007 until August 2011. He is now the chairman and CEO of Geoff Raby and Associates, a Beijing-based business advisory firm. Raby currently sits on the board of an Australian subsidiary of Chinese state-run Yanzhou Coal Mining Company.

Raby was appointed an Officer of the Order of Australia (AO) in the 2019 Queen's Birthday Honours for "distinguished service to Australia-China relations through senior diplomatic roles, and to multilateral trade policy development".

== Education and public career ==
Raby attended La Trobe University and graduated with bachelor's degree (Honours), a master's degree and a PhD in economics. He worked for the Department of Foreign Affairs and Trade in several positions as head of the Chinese Embassy's economics division (1986–1991), head of the Northeast Asia Analytical Unit (1991–1993), First Assistant Secretary, Trade Negotiations Division (1995–1998), Ambassador and Permanent Representative to the World Trade Organization (1998–2001) and First Assistant Secretary, International Organisations and Legal Division (2001–2002), Ambassador to the Asia-Pacific Economic Cooperation forum (2002–2004), and a Deputy Secretary of the Department (2002–2006). While based in Beijing from 1986 to 1991, he worked with Kevin Rudd, who served as Australia's Prime Minister and later Minister for Foreign Affairs while Raby was Ambassador to China.

He published a book concerning Australian economic history in 1996 entitled Making rural Australia: an economic history of technical and institutional creativity, 1788–1860.

== Career in the private sector ==
Since retiring as Ambassador to China, Raby has founded the consulting firm Geoff Raby & Associates, a business advisory firm promoting successful business operations that span national borders, and working to influence both public and private policy makers. His client list includes Queensland Investment Corporation.,

Raby was appointed as the Beijing-based Executive Director of Riverstone Advisory Pty Ltd, an adviser to law firm Corrs Chambers Westgarth and co-chair of the firm's China practice, and a Vice-Chancellor's Professorial Fellow at Monash University. OceanaGold, and SmartTrans Holdings Ltd. He is also a senior advisor to strategic communications firm Kreab Gavin Anderson.

Diplomatic posts
Preceded by Pamela Fayle	Australian Ambassador for APEC; 2002– 2005	Succeeded by Doug Chester
Preceded by Alan Thomas	Australian Ambassador to China; 2007–2011	Succeeded by Frances Adamson
