= Geoff Manning =

Australian author

Geoffrey Haydon Manning (1926–2018) was an Australian author and historian. He is known particularly for his books on South Australian placenames; Manning's Place Names of South Australia (1990) is particularly well-known and available online at the State Library of South Australia website. The final illustrated edition of this work was The Place Names Of Our Land: A South Australian Anthology (2009).

== Early life ==
Manning was born in Waikerie, South Australia, a son of carpenter Richard Baker Manning (1896–1936) and his wife Grace Maud Manning, née Hein (1901–).

== Career and other life interests ==
He was employed by the Savings Bank of South Australia until his retirement in 1982.

He greatly admired Labor Prime Minister Ben Chifley, and saw himself as espousing generally left-wing views.

== Local history ==
After retirement from the bank, Manning devoted himself fully to writing on local history. His works on South Australian placenames contain much information supplemental to, and correcting, the much earlier Nomenclature of South Australia (1908) by Rodney Cockburn (1877–1932) and What's in a Name, a revised edition by his journalist son Stewart Cockburn (1921–2009). John Hill, then Minister for the Environment, launched the online version of Manning’s Data Base of South Australian History in September 2005 at the State Library of South Australia.

His large collection of significant articles from South Australian newspapers has been digitised by the State Library of South Australia as The Manning Index of South Australian History. (Note: His 1081-page work, A Compendium of the Place Names of South Australia, is accessible via SLSA's search index, see External links below. As of 2021 it was also available as a complete downloadable document from the website maintained by Haydon R. Manning.)

In 1997 he released The Grange Golf Club: A History of the First 70 Years, 1926–1996 about The Grange Golf Club of Adelaide.

== Family, death and legacy ==
Manning married Gwen in September 1956; it was her second marriage and he thus became step-father to two daughters. Haydon R. Manning, political scientist of Flinders University, is his son.

Manning died in September 2018, leaving a legacy of invaluable historical work on South Australian history.

== Select bibliography ==
- Geoffrey H. Manning Hope Farm, Cradle of the McLaren Vale Wine Industry (1980) ISBN 0959439404
- Geoffrey H. Manning Whisky Makes You Well (1983) ISBN 095918760X
- Geoffrey H. Manning Hope Farm Chronicle (1984) ISBN 0959562990
- Geoffrey H. Manning (ed.) Memoirs of Thomas Frost, 1825–1910 (1985) ISBN 0959008705
- Geoffrey H. Manning The Tragic Shore (1988) ISBN 0909378444
- Geoffrey H. Manning and Haydon R. Manning Worth Fighting For (1989) ISBN 095953816X on bank employees' unionism
- Geoffrey H. Manning Manning's Place Names of South Australia, Adelaide, 1990
- Geoffrey H. Manning 50 Years of Singing; A History of the Adelaide Harmony Choir (1996) ISBN 9780646274003
- Geoffrey H. Manning and Alison Painter The Grange Golf Club; A history of the First 70 Years, 1926–1996 (1997) ISBN 0646313703
- Geoffrey H. Manning A Colonial Experience, 1838–1910 (2001) 3 Volumes set ISBN 0957865058
- Geoffrey H. Manning Manning’s Place Names of South Australia From Aaron Creek to Zion Hill (c.2006 ) "Includes facsimile of Rodney Cockburn's 'Nomenclature of South Australia' [1908]." (CD-ROM)
- Geoffrey H. Manning The Place Names Of Our Land: A South Australian Anthology (2009) ISBN 9780947284787
