= Rodney Cockburn =

Australian journalist and author (1877–1932)

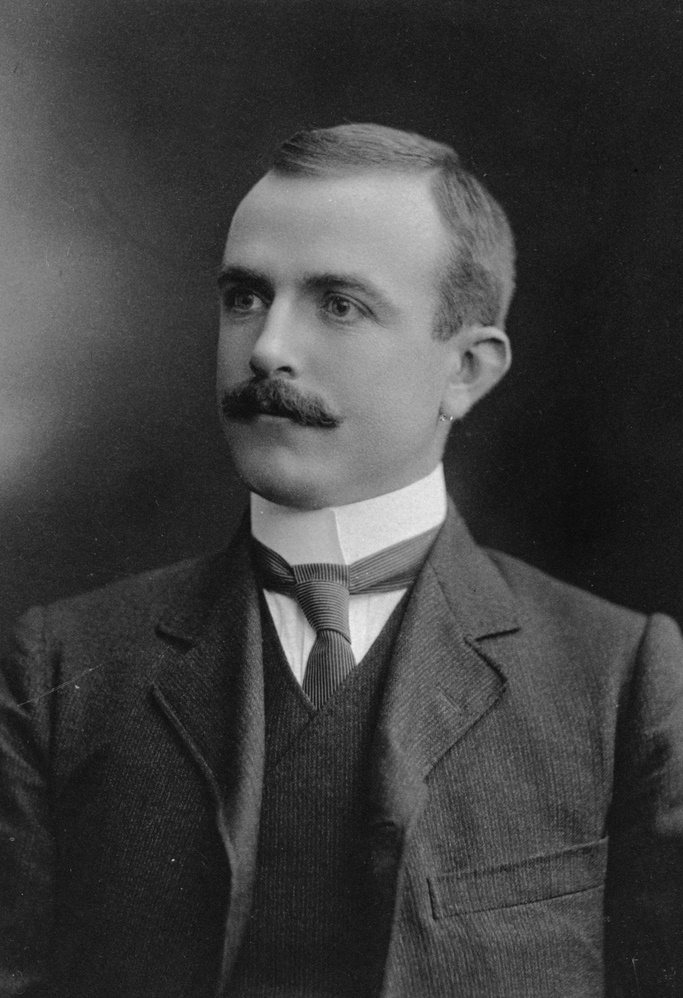
- Rodney Cockburn, c. 1904
- Born: October 21, 1877; Kent Town, South Australia, Australia
- Died: September 28, 1932 (aged 54)
- Occupations: journalist, author, parliamentary reporter
- Children: Stewart Cockburn

Rodney Cockburn (21 October 1877 – 28 September 1932) was a South Australian journalist, author of a popular reference book on South Australian place names.

== History ==
Cockburn was born in Kent Town, South Australia, a son of George (c. 1835 – 2 December 1909) and Mary Cockburn (née Stewart) (c. 1844 – 10 May 1880).

His father, born in Alloa, Scotland had served in the Royal Navy, then around 1860 emigrated to South Australia, where two half-brothers had already settled. He completed his apprenticeship as a printer at the Register, where he continued to work for over 48 years. He named his son Rodney, appropriately born on Trafalgar Day, for one of his ships, HMS Rodney, which was in turn named for Admiral Rodney.

He was educated at Flinders Street State school, and joined the Register as a "library boy" around 1892, and was elevated to the literary staff, where he was rated "one of the best journalists in Australia" and "the smartest journalist of his years, column-crowding the dailies", before he was made an "excellent sub-editor"

When in July 1914 the Peake government decided to institute a South Australian Hansard office, a function which had previously been contracted to the local press, Cockburn was selected assistant to Fred Johns's leader. He served in that position for eighteen years, until forced by ill-health to retire. Cockburn was admirably suited to the job, as he was noted for his speedy and accurate shorthand. Johns remembered his "bright and breezy nature, and sparkling wit and humor" somewhat offset by "temperamental faults — and who hasn't them". The work entailed not only recording the proceedings of the two houses of Parliament, but also of the various committees, notably the Public Works committee. Nevertheless, the position clearly allowed of time and facilities to pursue private research, as Johns produced a huge number of concise biographies of notable Australians which became a series of reference books, and Cockburn the voluminous notes on the histories of South Australian towns and geographical features, and the ensuing work for which he is remembered today, the manuscript of which the Mitchell Library acquired in 1936, and which was used by Stewart Cockburn for a new edition of his famous father's work entitled What's in a Name.

In August 1916, at the height of World War I anti-German sentiment, Cockburn was appointed to the South Australian Nomenclature Committee, which was given the hugely popular task of expunging place names of Teutonic origin or association from the State's map. Their deliberations resulted in the Nomenclature Act of 1917 and their consequent wholesale replacement (see List of changed names).

== Other interests ==
In his younger days he was a member of the North Adelaide Cycling Club.

He was also a lacrosse player and official, serving as secretary of the South Australian Lacrosse Association for several years. He was the organising chairman for a South Australian tour by the Canadian lacrosse team. He has been mentioned as reporting lacrosse activities for The Register under the pen-name "Canadia".

== Family ==
Rodney Cockburn married Marguerite Elizabeth Stapleton "Reta" Guerin (1883 – 5 January 1918) on 15 October 1910. Reta was a daughter of well-known accountant Herbert Robin Guerin, an AEI alumnus. He married again, to Ruby Ethel Adams Farmer ( –1954) on 1920. They had one son:

- (Alexander) Stewart Cockburn (1921–2009)

Alexander "Fid" Cockburn (1866–1943), Isabella Cockburn (1867–1903), George Stewart Cockburn (1869–1905), James Ralph Cockburn (1871–1900), Mary Cockburn (1873–1909), Walter Cockburn (1875–1903), and Margaret "Maggie" Cockburn (1879–1912) were siblings.

== Bibliography ==
- Rodney Cockburn Nomenclature of South Australia Adelaide [S. Aust.] : W.K. Thomas & Co., 1908.
- Rodney Cockburn and Stewart Cockburn What's in a name? : nomenclature of South Australia : authoritative derivations of some 4000 historically significant place names [Glen Osmond, S. Aust.] : Ferguson Publications, 1984 ISBN 095925191X
- Rodney Cockburn, A. Dorothy Aldersey Pastoral Pioneers of South Australia Lynton Publications, Blackwood, S.A., 1925

Also

- Manning, Geoffrey H. Manning’s Place Names of South Australia From Aaron Creek to Zion Hill (c.2006 ) "Includes facsimile of Rodney Cockburn's 'Nomenclature of South Australia' [1908]." CD-ROM, available at State Library of South Australia.

== Criticism ==
Cockburn's book Nomenclature of South Australia is not faultless, far from it. Geoff Manning, in the preface to Place Names of Our Land, the latest edition of his Romance of Place Names of South Australia, points out that apart from numerous omissions, something like one in ten entries contains errors of fact, some of them egregious. He is also critical of two pioneering toponymy historians, the surveyors C. H. Harris and H. C. Talbot who, when documented evidence was not available, published hearsay as fact. Information from these sources has been accepted uncritically by later historians, perpetuating many errors.
