= Christine Adamson =

Australian judge

The Honourable Justice Christine Elizabeth Adamson

Judge of the Supreme Court of NSW
- Incumbent
- Assumed office 17 October 2011

Personal details
- Born: 1962 or 1963 (age 63–64)
- Relations: Frances Adamson (sister)
- Parent: Jennifer Cashmore
- Education: Walford Anglican School for Girls; University of Adelaide
- Occupation: Judge, lawyer

Christine Elizabeth Adamson is an Australian judge. She has been a Judge of the Supreme Court of New South Wales since October 2011.

She was educated at Walford Anglican School for Girls and the University of Adelaide, where she graduated in 1986 with honours in law, and won the Stow Medal and Bennett Medal for academic distinction. In the same year, she was admitted to the bar as a solicitor and worked as a legal officer for the Commonwealth Attorney-General's Department for two years. From March 1988, she worked for the Australian Government Solicitor's Office. Beforehand, in 1987, she taught property law at the Australian National University. Afterward, in 1989, she taught Constitutional Law at the University of Sydney.

In February 1989, at the relatively young age of 26, Adamson was admitted to the New South Wales Bar. Her practice as a barrister included trade practices, administrative law, constitutional law, professional negligence, personal injury and disciplinary matters, and although initially appearing often in the Administrative Appeals Tribunal and Administrative Decisions Tribunal of New South Wales, she later developed a significant Supreme Court practice.

She attained senior counsel status in 2003, and was appointed chairperson of the Council of Law Reporting for New South Wales in 2004. She represented officers of a failed insurer before the HIH Insurance Royal Commission and was counsel assisting the Independent Commission Against Corruption in their investigations of state MPs Karyn Paluzzano and Angela D'Amore.

She was appointed to the Supreme Court by Attorney-General Greg Smith with effect from October 2011. In 2017, she presided over the trial of former state minister Ian Macdonald and union official John Maitland, sentencing McDonald to at least seven years imprisonment and Maitland to at least four years' imprisonment. The sentences were quashed on 25 February 2019 by the Court of Criminal Appeal, which held that Adamson had not properly directed the jury.

Adamson is the daughter of former South Australian state MP Jennifer Cashmore. Her sister, Frances Adamson, was Australia's first female Ambassador to China and, in October 2021, became the 36th Governor of South Australia.
