= Frances Adamson =

Australian public servant and diplomat

The Honourable Frances Adamson AC
- Adamson in 2026

36th Governor of South Australia
- In office 7 October 2021 – 6 October 2026
- Monarchs: Elizabeth II; Charles III
- Premier: Steven Marshall; Peter Malinauskas
- Lieutenant Governor: Brenda Wilson; James Muecke; Richard Harris
- Preceded by: Hieu Van Le
- Succeeded by: Richard Harris (acting); Grant Stevens (designate)

Secretary of the Department of Foreign Affairs and Trade
- In office 22 July 2016 – 25 June 2021
- Foreign Minister: Julie Bishop; Marise Payne
- Preceded by: Peter Varghese
- Succeeded by: Kathryn Campbell

Australian Ambassador to China
- In office August 2011 – February 2016
- Prime Minister: Julia Gillard; Kevin Rudd; Tony Abbott; Malcolm Turnbull
- Foreign Minister: Kevin Rudd; Bob Carr; Julie Bishop
- Preceded by: Geoff Raby
- Succeeded by: Jan Adams

Personal details
- Born: Frances Jennifer Adamson; 20 April 1961 (age 65) Adelaide, South Australia, Australia
- Spouse: Rod Bunten
- Relations: Christine Adamson (sister); Stewart Cockburn (stepfather)
- Children: 4
- Parents: Ian Adamson (father); Jennifer Cashmore (mother)
- Education: Walford Anglican School for Girls
- Alma mater: University of Adelaide (BEc)
- Occupation: Diplomat; public servant
- Frances Adamson's voice Adamson speaking at the Catherine Helen Spence Oration; Recorded 18 November 2025

Frances Jennifer Adamson (born 20 April 1961) is an Australian diplomat and public servant who served as the 36th governor of South Australia from 2021 to 2026. Before assuming the vice-regal office, she had a long career in the Department of Foreign Affairs and Trade (DFAT), including appointments as Australia's ambassador to China from 2011 to 2015 and secretary of DFAT from 2016 to 2021, becoming the first woman to serve in both positions.

Adamson was born in South Australia and brought up in the eastern suburbs of Adelaide as a sixth generation South Australian. She is the daughter of former South Australian parliamentarian Jennifer Cashmore as well as the stepdaughter of journalist Stewart Cockburn. She is the older sibling of Supreme Court of New South Wales judge Christine Adamson. Adamson attended Walford Anglican School for Girls but undertook a year's study at the Netherlands on an exchange program before completing her undergraduate studies at the University of Adelaide where she graduated with a Bachelor of Economics degree in 1985. She was the first female to be elected captain of the Adelaide University Boat Club in 1984.

After joining DAFT in 1985 during the Hawke–Keating economic reforms, Adamson undertook diplomatic postings in Hong Kong, New York, London, and Taipei, specialising in Asian affairs and international economics. She later served as head of the Australian Commerce and Industry Office in Taipei, Deputy High Commissioner to the United Kingdom, and chief of staff to Foreign Minister Stephen Smith, briefly following him into the defence portfolio while remaining a career diplomat. In 2011, she became the first woman appointed as Australia's ambassador to China, serving in Beijing during a period that included China's leadership transition and the negotiation of the China–Australia Free Trade Agreement, while also engaging on issues such as Tibet and Xinjiang. After returning to Canberra as foreign policy adviser to Prime Minister Malcolm Turnbull in 2015, she was appointed secretary of DFAT in 2016, again becoming the first woman to hold the position. During her five-year tenure, she oversaw the development of the 2017 Australian Foreign Policy White Paper, promoted Australia's Indo-Pacific strategy, supported greater representation of women in diplomacy and national security, managed relations with the Pacific and China, and coordinated major consular and diplomatic responses during the COVID-19 pandemic, including the repatriation of Australians overseas.

In May 2021, Premier Steven Marshall revealed that Adamson will be appointed as the next Governor of South Australia, becoming the third female governor of the state. Adamson retired from the public service in June and took the oath of office as governor on 7 October in Government House, after being appointed by Queen Elizabeth II. During her term, she administered the swearing-in of Premier Peter Malinauskas after the 2022 state election, presided over various ceremonies related to the coronation of King Charles III, and supported various reconciliation efforts. She assented to the First Nations Voice Bill 2023, making South Australia the first Australian state to establish a First Nations Voice to Parliament. In April 2026, she stated that she would end her term as governor on 6 October 2026 and that she would not accept Malinauskas' invitation to continue her term past five years.

== Early life and education ==
Adamson was born on 21 April 1961 in Adelaide, South Australia, and was brought up in the eastern suburbs of the city. Adamson is the sixth generation of South Australian descendants. While her mother is Jennifer Cashmore, former member of parliament and minister of the government of John Tonkin, her father Ian Adamson was a management consultant and company general manager. Her siblings include Christine Adamson, judge of Supreme Court of New South Wales and Stuart Adamson, Anglican Chaplain of Prince of Wales Hospital. Moreover, she is the step-daughter of South Australian journalist Stewart Cockburn.

Adamson attended Walford Anglican School for Girls in Hyde Park, where she was elected vice president of the Student Representative Council in Year 12. After graduating, she spent a year in the Netherlands on a student exchange program before studying at University of Adelaide, where she completed a Bachelor of Economics in 1985. During her university studies, she worked part-time at The Cork and Cleaver in Glenunga and, in 1984, was elected the first female captain of the Adelaide University Boat Club. As a final-year economics student, she participated in the Economists in Action government program, during which she visited Canberra and observed the work of public sector economists.

== Diplomatic career ==
=== Early career (1985–2010) ===
After finishing her undergraduate education, Adamson looked forward to going to Roseworthy Agricultural College to undertake applied science and oenology, hoping to be a winemaker. However, instead of that in 1985 she enrolled into the Department of Foreign Affairs and Trade (DFAT) at a time when economic reforms were being undertaken by the Hawke–Keating government, resulting in an increase in the demand for economists in Canberra, due to the openness of the Australian economy. In May 1985, after having spent three months in the department, she returned back to Adelaide in order to receive her economics studies. Despite having Paris as her first choice as foreign post, she got posted to Asia and started studying Chinese.

Adamson served as an economist at the Australian Consulate-General in Hong Kong from 1987 to 1991. After returning to Canberra for a year, she undertook a brief posting at the Australian Mission to the United Nations in New York. During the tenure of Foreign Minister Alexander Downer, she testified during the investigation into the AWB oil-for-wheat scandal. She subsequently took maternity leave and later served for four and a half years as political counsellor at the Australian High Commission in London. Following a further period in Canberra between 1998 and 2000, she was posted to Taipei, where she headed the Australian Commerce and Industry Office from 2001 to 2005. She later returned to London and served as Deputy High Commissioner to the United Kingdom from July 2005 to January 2009.

Adamson became chief of staff to Foreign Minister Stephen Smith under the Gillard–Rudd governments from January 2009 and December 2010. She accepted the role on the condition that she could manage her family responsibilities and that, as a career diplomat, she would not be involved in party politics. According to a report by the DFAT, she was made aware of the death of Ben Zygier sometime after February 2010. In subsequent interview, Julie Bishop stated that it was not credible that Adamson had not informed Smith of Zygier's incarceration. When Smith was moved to the defence portfolio, Adamson briefly followed him in the same capacity.

=== Ambassador of Australia to China (2011–2015) ===
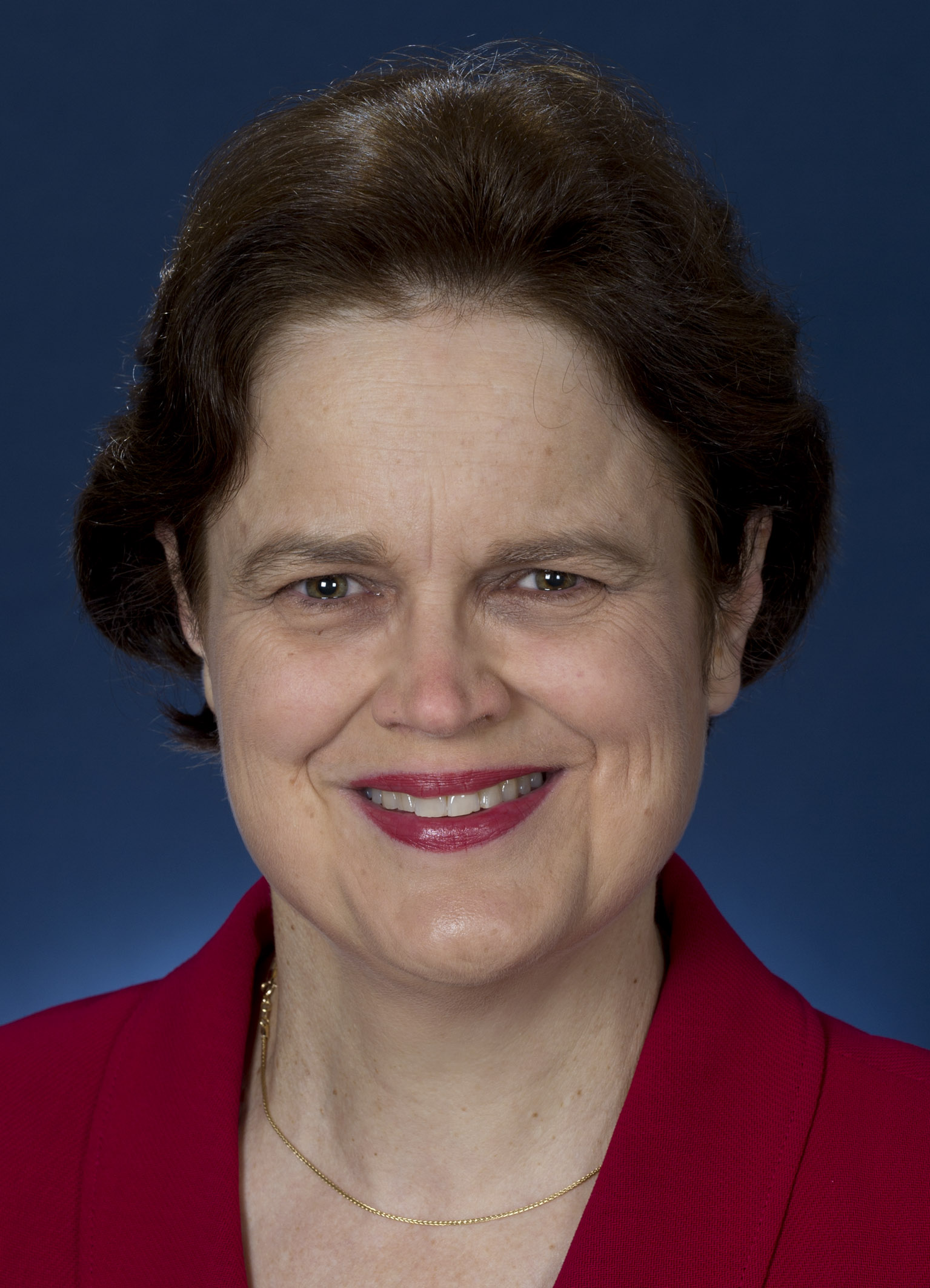
Official portrait, 2011

On 21 March 2011, Adamson was appointed as Australia's ambassador to China, succeeding Geoff Raby and becoming the first woman to hold the position. She arrived in Beijing on 8 August 2011 and presented her credentials to President Hu Jintao on 16 August. She was received by Yang Jiechi on 25 August.

In March 2012, Foreign Minister Bob Carr stated that Adamson would seek to visit Tibet to engage with local communities and assess concerns regarding Tibetan self-immolations. Despite repeated requests over nearly a year, she did not obtain approval from Chinese authorities for the visit. On 12 November 2012, Adamson reported that then-Vice President Xi Jinping was familiar with Australia and had visited all Australian states and territories. Adamson participated in negotiations leading to the establishment of a strategic partnership between China and Australia following leadership transitions in China in early 2013 and continued engagement with Chinese counterparts alongside other Australian diplomats. She also noted the release of Australia's 2013 Defence White Paper on 23 May 2013 in the context of broader policy announcements. Later that year, on 16 October, she hosted Michael Bryce and Governor-General Quentin Bryce at the Ambassador's Residence in Beijing. From 31 August to 2 September 2014, she visited Xinjiang and met with Zhang Chunxian.

During her tenure, the China–Australia Free Trade Agreement was negotiated and concluded, and she was involved in promoting the concept of a broader partnership with then newly appointed General Secretary Xi, with the aim of aligning political and diplomatic relations with existing economic ties between the two countries. The agreement was signed in June 2015. On 22 October, Foreign Minister Bishop announced that Adamson would conclude her term as ambassador to China and be succeeded by Jan Adams. Her return to Canberra was linked to her appointment as foreign affairs adviser to Prime Minister Malcolm Turnbull.

In November 2015, Adamson was appointed foreign policy adviser to Turnbull. During Turnbull's visit to Antalya following the November 2015 Paris attacks, she was part of his advisory team and participated in national security briefings of the National Security Committee of Cabinet. Her earlier appointment as chief of staff to Foreign Minister Smith under a Labor government had attracted attention within sections of the Liberal Party.

=== Secretary of DFAT (2016–2021) ===
Following the announcement of the retirement of Peter Varghese in November 2015, Adamson was considered among candidates for the position of Secretary of DFAT. She was appointed to the role by Turnbull for a five-year term commencing on 22 July 2016, becoming the first woman to serve in that position. Her appointment followed her previous service as ambassador to China and advisory roles to governments from both major political parties.

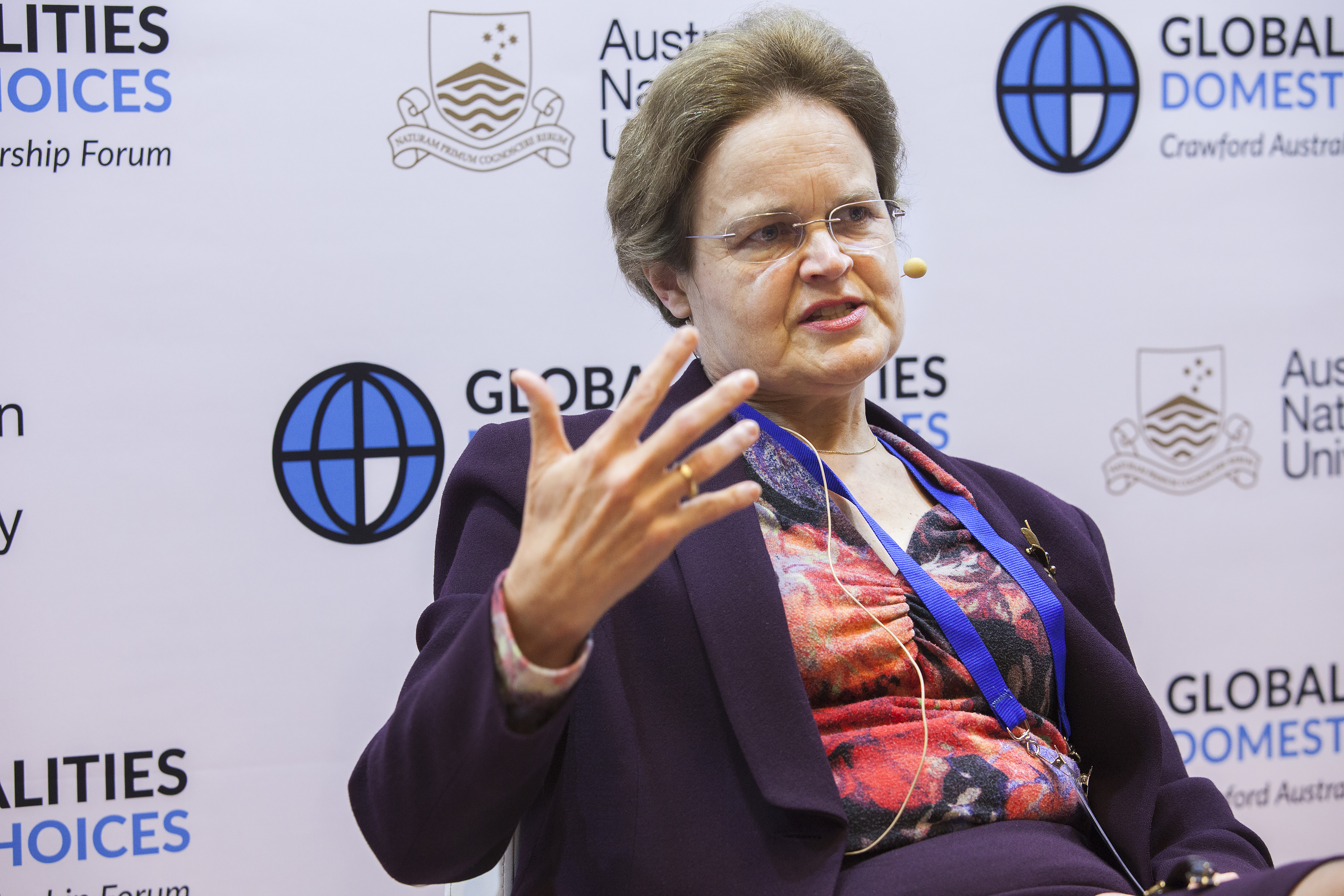
Adamson speaking at the Crawford Asian Leadership Forum at the Australian National University (ANU) on 20 June 2017

On 6 April 2017, Adamson stated that the absence of women in senior diplomatic and national security roles was "not good enough", noting that Australia had not nominated a female head of mission to posts including Jakarta, Tokyo, Washington, D.C., and London. The 2017 Australian Foreign Policy White Paper was developed during the early period of her tenure as Secretary of DFAT and was confirmed by Bishop on 14 December 2016. Adamson was accountable for and managed DFAT's contribution to the document's development. The paper described changes in the global system and referred to strategic, political, and economic shifts. It also addressed tensions in the South China Sea, including references to China's actions in the region.

On 22 February 2018, Adamson made her maiden trip to Papua New Guinea and was appointed co-chair of the Bilateral Security Dialogue with that country. Adamson stated in a June 2018 interview that she felt "personally most gloomy" about the rise of global protectionism, claiming that nations like Australia relied on free and open trade for jobs and economic prosperity. She introduced Australia's Indo-Pacific foreign policy framework in an October 2018 speech at the Australian National University, basing it on what the text refers to as "practical geopolitical reasoning."

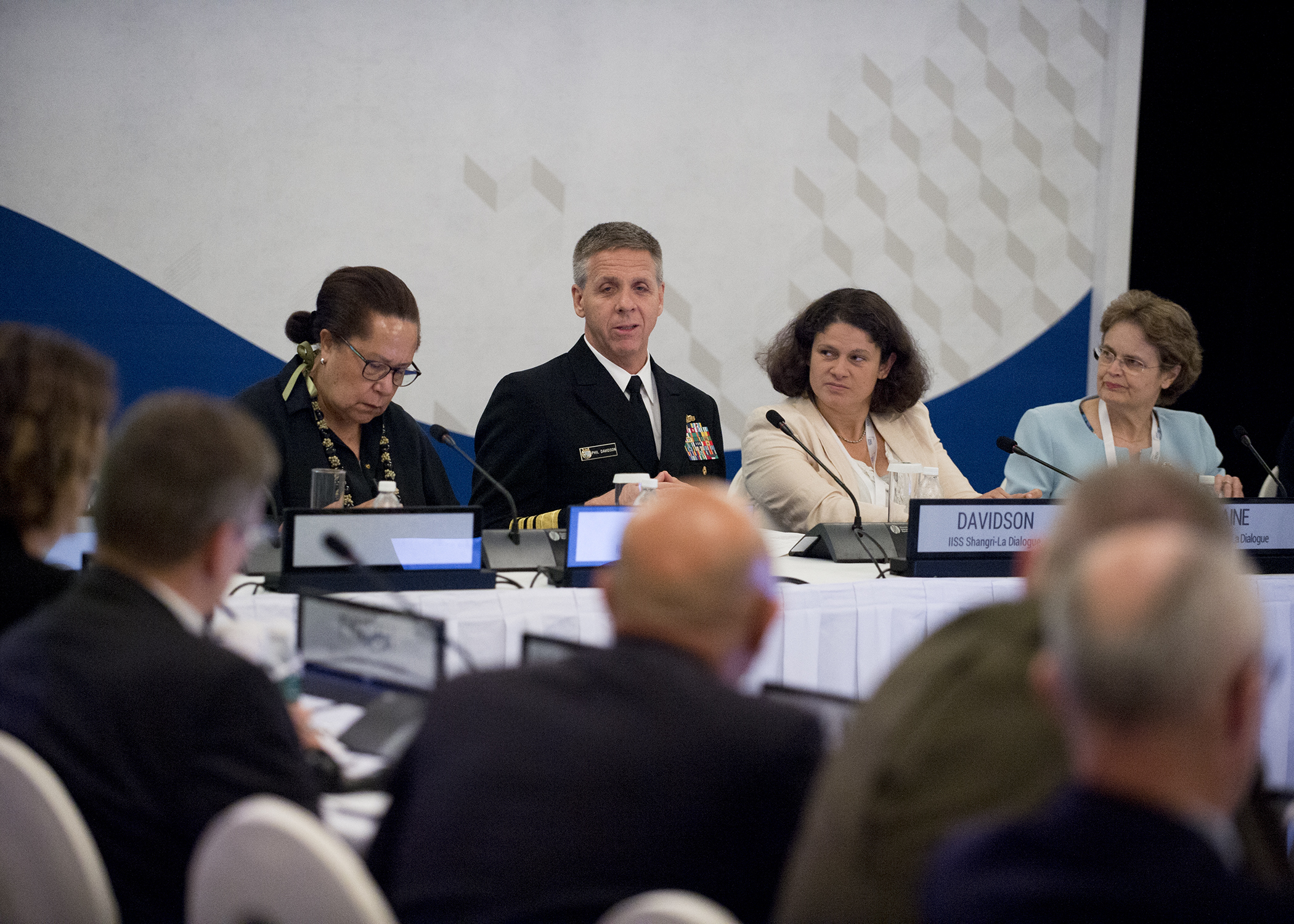
(L–R) Meg Taylor, Phil Davidson, Sarah Raine, Alice Guitton, and Adamson at the 2019 Shangri-La Dialogue on 1 June

Adamson made contributions towards the implementation process of the AusAID-DFAT integration after 2013 through articulating a vision of international development in the 2019 Australasian Aid Conference. His contribution was acknowledged in another study as an indication of a direction in policy for integrating aid and foreign policy although it was mentioned that there was inadequate capacity for implementation in the department. At the 2019 Shangri-La Dialogue, she described Australia's Pacific "Step-up" as aligned with priorities expressed by Pacific governments and communities. In June, she stated that any foreign military installation in Australia's region would be "not welcome" and would have a negative impact on Australia's strategic environment.

In April 2020, amid heightened diplomatic tensions following Australian calls for an independent inquiry into the origins of COVID-19, Adamson engaged with Chinese counterparts, including contacting the Chinese ambassador to Australia after public comments suggesting potential Chinese consumer and tourist boycotts of Australia in response to the Morrison government's position. In May, she identified COVID-19 as the Indo-Pacific region's most significant immediate challenge, with implications for Australia's longer-term interests, and participated in regular coordination calls with counterparts in the United States, Vietnam, South Korea, Japan, India, and New Zealand, as well as through multilateral forums including ASEAN and the G20. She also stated that the pandemic created a "blank slate" opportunity for the Australian Public Service to reconsider its operations and improve effectiveness. In April 2021, she noted that Australia was vaccinating diplomats and their families stationed overseas, classifying them as "critical and high-risk workers."

In May 2021, Adamson was associated with Australia's consular response to the COVID-19 pandemic, including coordination of the Pacific "Step-up" policy, and commented on internal departmental priorities including gender representation in senior diplomatic positions. In June, she stated that Australian diplomats were working with a "steely determination" to reunite children stranded in India with their parents during COVID-19 travel disruptions. According to Dan Tehan, she oversaw Australia's largest consular operation during the pandemic, which included assisting and repatriating a large number of Australians overseas.

During her final week as Secretary of DFAT, on 23 June 2021, Adamson spoke at the National Press Club. In her speech, she said that China was "dogged by insecurity" and there was a "deeply defensive mindset," implying that it saw threats outside while acting in its own interests. In addition, She characterised China's 2020 list of demands to the Australian government as a diplomatic misstep that had backfired and that democratically elected governments could not accept. During the same event, Adamson pointed out that Afghan citizens who worked with the Australian military were in danger after Australia withdrew from Afghanistan, and stated that Australia understood that some of them were in both immediate and potential risks, and visa processing for locally engaged employees was being expedited. She also said that influence in the Indo-Pacific region would hinge upon contributions to recovery after the pandemic and reiterated Australia's interest in balancing the region on the basis of freedom.

== Governor of South Australia ==
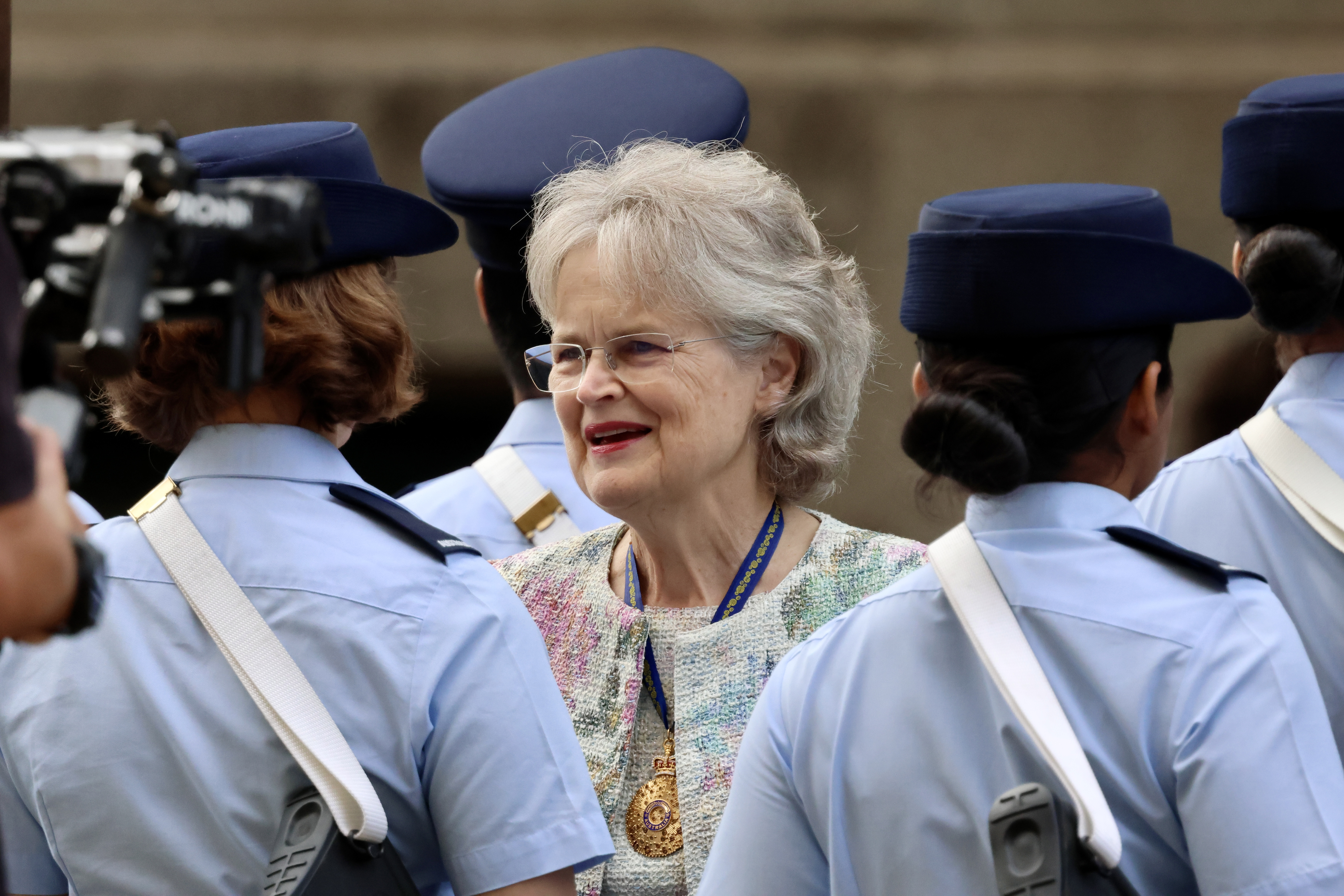
Adamson at the 2026 State Opening of the Parliament of South Australia on 5 May

On 19 May 2021, Premier Steven Marshall announced that Adamson would succeed Hieu Van Le as governor of South Australia from October, returning to South Australia after more than three decades overseas. She became the third female governor of the state, following Roma Mitchell and Marjorie Jackson-Nelson. Following her nomination, she retired from the public service on 25 June 2021. Her appointment was supported by Foreign Minister Marise Payne and then-Opposition Leader Peter Malinauskas. She was sworn in as governor on 7 October 2021 at Government House, Adelaide, and was formally appointed under the royal sign-manual of Elizabeth II.

Adamson had to be in isolation in December 2021 after being classified as a close contact of a COVID-positive case associated with former Premier Jay Weatherill and later tested negative. She swore in Malinauskas as the 47th Premier of South Australia alongside the swearing-in of Stephen Mullighan as Treasurer and Susan Close after the state elections in March 2022. During the National Reconciliation Week in 2022, she ensured that the Aboriginal and Torres Strait Islander flags were permanently flown at Government House. Renovation of the private residence at Government House was underway in May 2022 during her administration. In September 2022, she conducted a proclamation ceremony at Parliament House to proclaim Charles III as sovereign of South Australia and later met him at Buckingham Palace on 24 September 2022.

Adamson participated in a function organised by the South Australia–Vietnam Business Council on 28 February 2023 celebrating the 50th anniversary of the diplomatic relations between Australia and Vietnam. On the same day in March, she assented to the First Nations Voice Bill 2023 during a special meeting of the Executive Council on the steps of Parliament House, thus becoming the first governor in Australia to give legal recognition to a First Nations Voice to Parliament. In April 2024, during the visit of Governor-General David Hurley, she hosted a lunch at Government House. An official visit to Thailand and the United Kingdom took place in July of that year. The next year, her salary was increased as a result of a determination made by the South Australian Remuneration Tribunal. In April 2026, she went on an official visit to Hong Kong to foster educational and agri-food connections. Also in that month, she announced that she would be stepping down from her role as governor on 6 October 2026, despite Malinauskas's request for her to stay on.

== Titles, styles and honours ==
Viceregal styles of Frances Adamson
- Reference style: Her Excellency
- Spoken style: Your Excellency

Adamson was awarded the University of Adelaide's Distinguished Alumni Award in 2014 for her contribution to international relations. In 2015, she was honoured with the Sir James Wolfensohn Public Service Scholarship by the Harvard Club of Australia. She was the President of the Institute of Public Administration Australia (IPAA) Australian Capital Territory Division from 2017 to 2019. On 25 September 2019, she was made an IPAA National Fellow for her contribution to public administration.

For her eminent service to public administration through the advancement of Australia's diplomatic, trade, and cultural interests, especially with China and the Indo-Pacific region, to foreign policy development and program delivery, and as the 36th Governor of South Australia, Adamson was made a Companion of the Order of Australia in the 2021 Queen's Birthday Honours. To celebrate UN Public Service Day in 2022, the Frances Adamson Oration was launched. In December 2022, the ANU granted her an Honorary Doctor of Laws (honoris causa) for her contributions to Australian foreign policy and diplomacy. As of 2026, she is additionally a Dame of Grace of the Order of Saint John, and she and her husband are the patrons of about 50 organisations in addition to about 120.

== Personal life ==
Although Adamson and her husband, Rod Bunten, who is a British diplomat, both worked in the diplomatic service, she for Australia and him for the British government, they first met in Hong Kong. Due to their involvement in the diplomatic service, their marriage needed permission from their respective governments. Bunten retrained as a teacher in order to facilitate his wife's postings amid the raising of their children. The couple has four children whose names are Claire, Matthew, Katherine and Sophie. In her free time, she likes hiking, drinking wine and listening to classical music.

Diplomatic posts
Preceded by Sam Gerovich	Representative, Australian Commerce and Industry Office Taipei; 2000–2005	Succeeded by Steve Waters
Preceded by Geoff Raby	Australian Ambassador to China; 2011–2015	Succeeded by Jan Elizabeth Adams
Government offices
Preceded by Peter Varghese	Secretary of the Department of Foreign Affairs and Trade; 2016–2021	Succeeded by Kathryn Campbell
Preceded by Hieu Van Le	Governor of South Australia; 2021–2026	Succeeded by Grant Stevens
