= Brenda Wilson =

Australian health administrator and former Lieutenant-Governor of South Australia

Professor Brenda Wilson AM FAICD

Lieutenant-Governor of South Australia
- In office 15 August 2014 – 20 January 2022
- Governor: Kevin Scarce; Hieu Van Le; Frances Adamson
- Preceded by: Hieu Van Le
- Succeeded by: James Muecke

Personal details
- Spouse: Dr Kym Bannister
- Website: http://www.governor.sa.gov.au/

Brenda Wilson AM was chief executive of Cancer Council SA, from 2002 to May 2015 and was South Australia's first female Lieutenant-Governor, serving from 15 August 2014 to 20 January 2022.

== Early life ==
Wilson was born in Wales and migrated to Australia as a young girl with her parents and older sister in 1959.

== Career ==
Wilson has worked in the health industry since 1973, training in nursing at the Royal Adelaide Hospital (RAH) from 1973 to 1976. She was later nurse manager at the RAH from 1985 to 1989. She then became Director of Nursing at Hampstead Rehabilitation Centre (HRC) from 1989 to 1992 and was promoted to CEO of HRC from 1992 to 1994.

Wilson was CEO of the Cancer Council SA from 2003 to 2015. She was a member of the board of Burnside War Memorial Hospital, Adelaide between 2003 and 2011. and a former Board Director of Opera SA

In 2014, Wilson was appointed to the board of aged care provider ACH Group.

Wilson was sworn in as Lieutenant-Governor of South Australia on 15 August 2014, replacing Hieu Van Le who became governor on 1 September.

In 2016, she and a bunch of other people were members of a flash mob; they posed as statues at Adelaide Airport.

Brenda is currently a member of the ACHA and WCHN Boards and Chairman of the Board of Helping Hand Aged Care

== Academic ranks and awards ==
Wilson has a Diploma of Applied Science (Nursing), Bachelor of Business (Health) and an MBA. She is a fellow of the Australian Institute of Company Directors (FAICD), a Fellow of the College of Health Service Executives (FCHSE), a fellow of the Royal College of Nursing Australia (FRCNA) and a fellow of the Wharton School of Management.

Wilson was the recipient of the Telstra Business Women's Award, Corporate and Government Sector in 2000.

In the 2019 Queen's Birthday Honours Wilson was appointed a Member of the Order of Australia (AM) for "significant service to community health, and to the people of South Australia through a range of roles".

== Personal life ==
Wilson's partner is Dr Kym Bannister, a nephrologist and nuclear physician, and she is stepmother to his two sons.

Government offices
Preceded by Hieu Van Le	Lieutenant-Governor of South Australia; 2015–present	Incumbent
