= Jennifer Cashmore =

Australian politician (1937–2024)

The Honourable Jennifer Cashmore AM
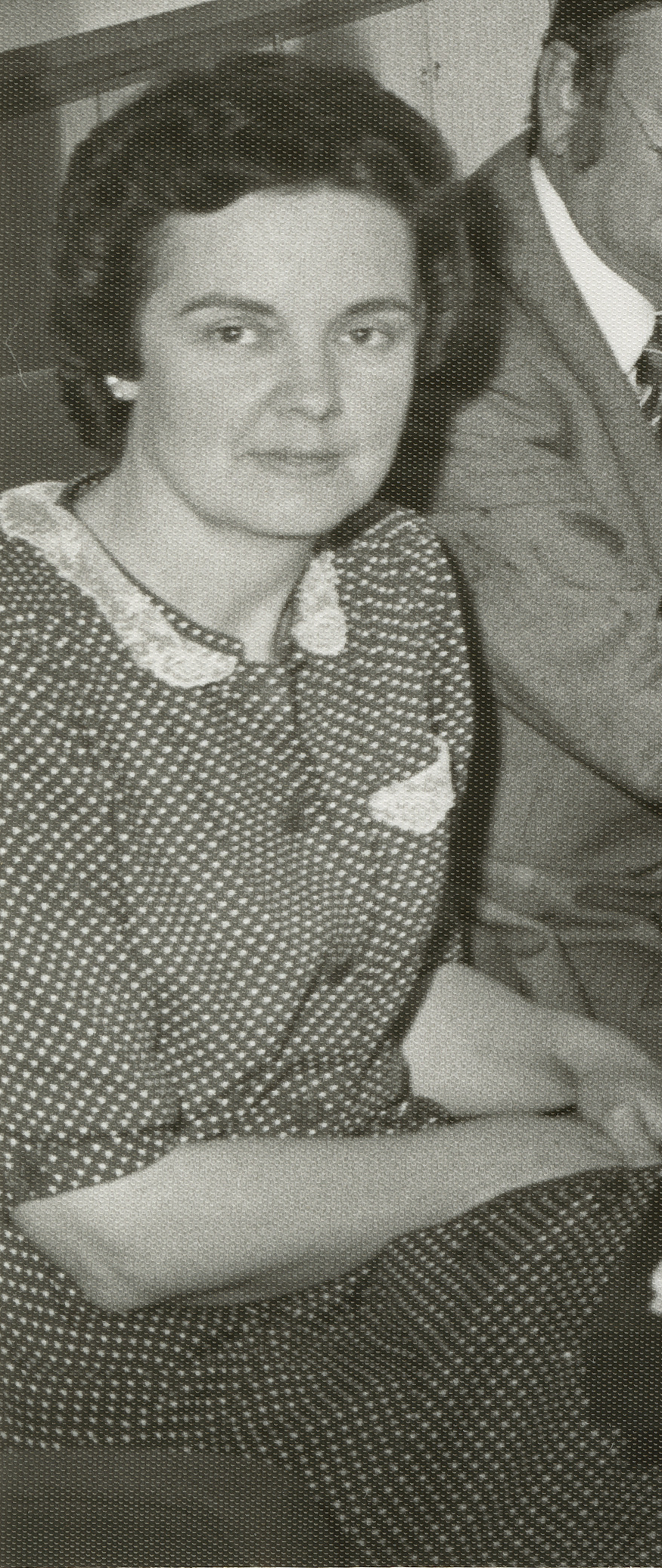
- Adamson at a cabinet meeting in 1979

Member of the South Australian House of Assembly for Coles
- In office 17 September 1977 – 10 December 1993
- Preceded by: Des Corcoran
- Succeeded by: Joan Hall

Personal details
- Born: 5 December 1937
- Died: 10 June 2024 (aged 86)
- Party: Liberal
- Spouses: Ian Adamson (divorced ~1986); Stewart Cockburn (married 1988)
- Children: Frances Adamson; Christine Adamson; Stuart Adamson

Jennifer Lilian Cashmore AM (5 December 1937 – 10 June 2024) was an Australian politician. She was a Liberal Party member of the South Australian House of Assembly between 1977 and 1993, representing the eastern suburbs seat of Coles (Morialta since 2002). Cashmore was the third woman to be elected to the House of Assembly.

Cashmore served as Minister for Health and Minister for Tourism during the 1979–1982 Tonkin government, the first woman member of Cabinet since Joyce Steele. In 1992 she contested the leadership of her party against John Olsen and Dean Brown, the eventual winner.

Once dubbed the 'green conscience' of the Liberal Party, Cashmore was a strong advocate for national parks and euthanasia. She was the first member to raise questions about the financial viability of the State Bank before the 1989 election.

She was appointed AM in the Australia Day Honours, 1998.

== Personal life ==
Cashmore was a daughter of Arthur Herbert Cashmore (11 February 1899 – 24 March 1954) and Myrtle Cashmore, the fifth of six children. Her father was the proprietor of Maltina Bakery of Henley Beach Road, Torrensville. She was educated at Walford House School, where her sisters Margaret, Helen, Nancy, and Gillian were also prize-winning students.

She married Adelaide businessman Ian Adamson sometime around 1958. She was the mother of South Australian Governor Frances Adamson, Supreme Court of New South Wales judge Christine Adamson and Anglican chaplain Stuart Adamson.

The first part of her time in parliament was as Jennifer Adamson. She reverted to her maiden name Cashmore after that marriage ended in 1986. She married Stewart Cockburn in 1988.

Cashmore died on 10 June 2024, at the age of 86.

== See also ==
- Women and government in Australia
- Women in the South Australian House of Assembly

South Australian House of Assembly
Preceded by Des Corcoran	Member for Coles; 1977–1993	Succeeded by Joan Hall
