= Hieu Van Le =

Former Governor of South Australia

The Honourable Hieu Van Le AC
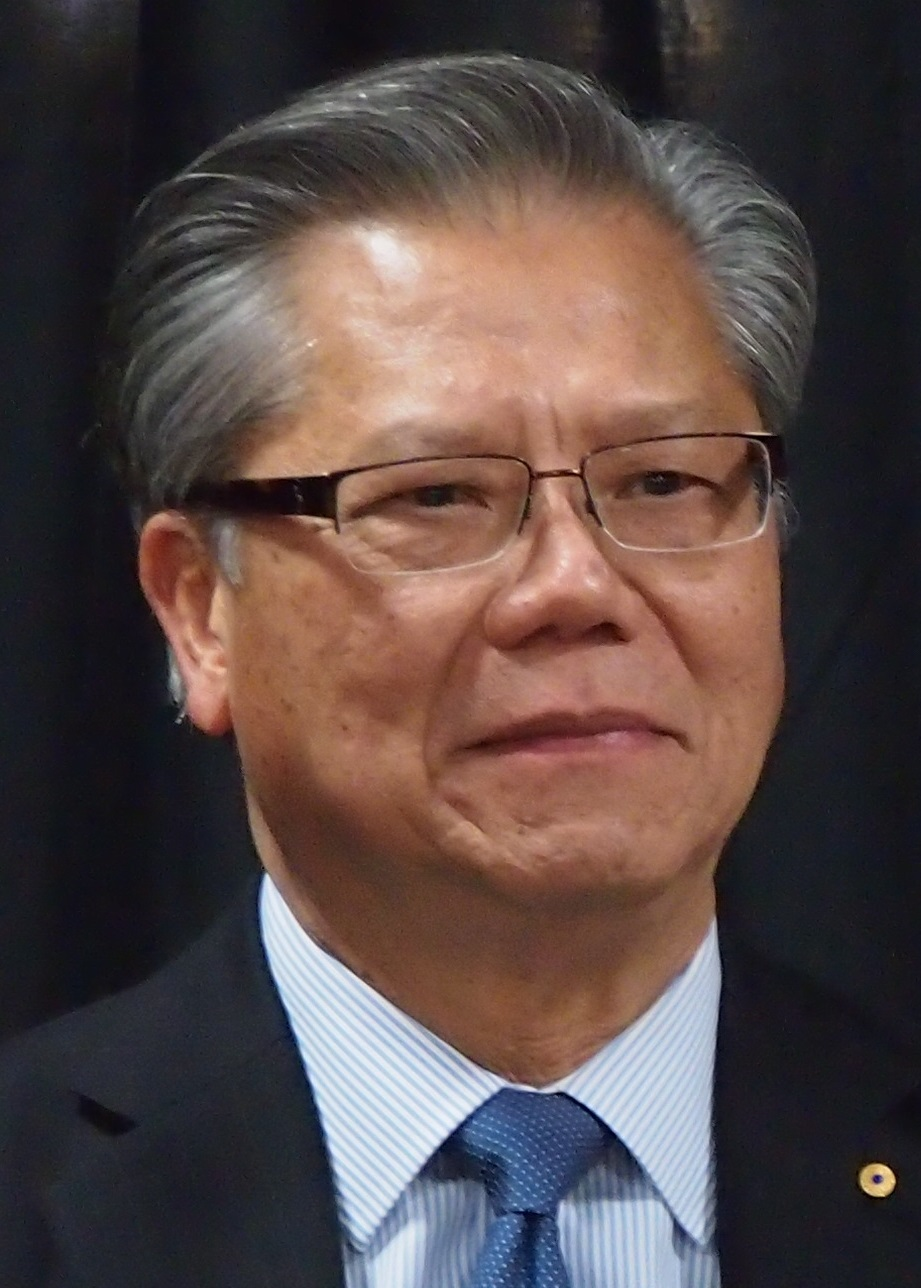
- Le in 2015

35th Governor of South Australia
- In office 1 September 2014 – 31 August 2021
- Monarch: Elizabeth II
- Premier: Jay Weatherill; Steven Marshall
- Lieutenant Governor: Brenda Wilson
- Preceded by: Kevin Scarce
- Succeeded by: Frances Adamson

Lieutenant Governor of South Australia
- In office 31 August 2007 – 15 August 2014
- Governor: Kevin Scarce
- Preceded by: Bruno Krumins
- Succeeded by: Brenda Wilson

Personal details
- Born: 1 January 1954 (age 72) Quảng Trị, State of Vietnam, Indochinese Federation
- Spouse: Lan T. Phuong
- Children: 2
- Education: Dalat University; University of Adelaide
- Profession: Accountant; Economist
- Website: Governor.sa.gov.au

Hieu Van Le, AC (Vietnamese: Lê Văn Hiếu; born 1 January 1954) is an Australian politician who served as the 35th governor of South Australia, in office from 1 September 2014 to 31 August 2021. He served as the state's lieutenant-governor from 2007 to 2014. He also served as chair of the South Australian Multicultural and Ethnic Affairs Commission (SAMEAC) from 2006 to 2009. Le is the first person of East Asian heritage to be appointed a state governor in Australia, and first person of Vietnamese background to be appointed to a vice-regal position anywhere in the world.

== Early life ==
Le was born in Quảng Trị, Southern Vietnam, on 1 January 1954. His father was a Viet Minh soldier who fought for Vietnamese independence from French colonists and was killed in action whilst his mother Hanh was still pregnant with him. He had 2 older brothers and was educated in Đà Nẵng, and later attended Dalat University where he was a student representative leader, studying economics. In early 1977, whilst just finished studying his degree, both his brothers who were ARVN soldiers were sent to reeducation camps by the new communist regime. Job prospects were also low due to stigma in hiring relatives of 'traitors' and he felt there was no longer a future for him to remain.

Le decided to flee Vietnam in search of a better life, with his new wife Lan and 50 other people. They embarked on a small fishing boat with Le as their nominated navigator, and whose only equipment was a hand-drawn map of Vietnam and Southeast Asia. The vessel made it to the coast of the Malay Peninsula after traveling west for ten days at sea, but was denied entry six times, and was driven out by the Malaysian coast guard. The group decided to try their luck and head to Singapore but a warship blocked their entry. The boat was in poor condition, with fuel and water running out.

Le later recalled "I said 'Look if we go on like this we will all die soon. Our last action is to abandon the boat and swim because it will soon be a trap for all of us'. With the last fuel we steered the boat and got into shallow water 50-60 meters from the shore and the coastguard came out again and I gave the order to jump." The Malaysian coast guard preparing to fire warning shots, and the refugees swam to shallow water, with the coastguard surrounding them with barbed wire where they stood. They were eventually allowed settlement at an island refugee camp two weeks later.

After several months in the camp, Le met a man who owned a small boat who expressed his desire to sail to Australia with Le as his navigator. Adamant at first, after learning further navigational skills from a former naval personnel on the island, he agreed and they collected spare parts and materials from all the abandoned boats along the coast, later going on a second voyage with 42 people and more supplies in November. After nearly a month the boat first ran into Melville Island and from there Darwin, Northern Territory as a refugee. Upon embarking on shore knowing he was an illegal migrant, Le was prepared to be greeted by a gunboat to drive them back to sea but found themselves met by several Australians who were fishing and drinking beer, and shouted at him "G'day mate. Welcome to Australia" as they passed by. Le and his wife obtained temporary permits to stay in Australia, and relocated to Adelaide where they stayed at the Pennington Migrant Hostel for a period to learn how to transition to Australian life, where he worked menial jobs like fruit picking. His two sons were born in Australia and are named after Australian cricketers Sir Donald Bradman and Kim Hughes.

== Career ==
After arriving in Australia, Le intending to start over attended the University of Adelaide, receiving a Master of Business Administration and an Economics degree. He was a senior investigator and manager with the Australian Securities and Investments Commission from the early 1990s until his retirement in 2009. He is also a member of the Australian Society of Certified Practising Accountants (CPA) and a Fellow Member of the Financial Services Institute of Australasia (Finsia). As of 2024, Le is the Chairperson of the South Australian Health and Medical Research Institute and the Adelaide Festival Centre Trust Board. He is also patron, life member, honorary member, director, trustee or ambassador for 25 other organizations.

== Governor ==
Le's appointment as Governor of South Australia to replace Kevin Scarce was announced on 26 June 2014; he took office on 1 September, with Scarce's term expiring on 7 August. Le is a Catholic and credits his experiences as a refugee for strengthening his religious convictions. In June 2019, Premier Steven Marshall announced that Le's original term as governor had been extended by two years, to 31 August 2021. During this time, Le has served as patron for over 230 organizations.

== Honours ==
Viceregal styles of Hieu Van Le (2018–present)
- Reference style: His Excellency the Honourable
- Spoken style: Your Excellency

Orders

- 2009: Officer of the Order of Australia (AO)
- (Australia) 2014: Knight of Grace of the Order of St John
- 2016: Companion of the Order of Australia (AC)

Medals

- 2001: Centenary Medal "for service to the advancement of multiculturalism in Australia",

Appointments

- 2014: Colonel of the Royal South Australia Regiment.
- (United Kingdom) 2014: Deputy Prior of the Order of St John.

Government offices
Preceded by Bruno Krumins	Lieutenant-Governor of South Australia; 2007–2014	Succeeded by Brenda Wilson
Preceded by Kevin Scarce	Governor of South Australia; 2014–2021	Succeeded by Frances Adamson
