= Governor of South Australia =

Vice-regal representative

- Badge of the governor

- Flag of the governor since 2024
- Incumbent; Richard Harris (acting) since 6 October 2026
- Vice Regal
- Style: Her Excellency; The Honourable
- Residence: Government House
- Seat: Adelaide
- Appointer: Monarch on the advice of the premier
- Term length: At His Majesty's pleasure; (usually 5 years by convention)
- Constituting instrument: Letters Patent of 29 October 1900
- Formation: 28 December 1836
- First holder: Captain John Hindmarsh
- Salary: $530,080 (since February 2026)
- Website: governor.sa.gov.au

The governor of South Australia is the representative in South Australia of the monarch, currently King Charles III. The governor performs the same constitutional and ceremonial functions at the state level as does the governor-general of Australia at the national level. In accordance with the conventions of the Westminster system of parliamentary government, the governor nearly always acts solely on the advice of the head of the elected government, the premier of South Australia. Nevertheless, the governor retains the reserve powers of the Crown, and has the right to dismiss the premier.

The current governor is Richard Harris who is serving as Administrator of the Government of the State of South Australia, following the retirement of Frances Adamson.

The new governor, Commissioner of Police Grant Stevens, will be sworn in on 9 December 2026.

The governor's official residence is Government House, in Adelaide, the state's capital.

== History ==
The first six governors oversaw the Colony of South Australia from proclamation in 1836, until self-government and an elected Parliament of South Australia was granted in the year prior to the inaugural 1857 election.

The first Australian-born governor of South Australia was Major-General Sir James Harrison (appointed 1968), and most subsequent governors have been Australian-born. The first South Australian-born governor was Sir Mark Oliphant (appointed 1971), and the first Aboriginal governor was Sir Douglas Nicholls (appointed 1976). The first female governor was Dame Roma Mitchell, appointed in 1991.

From June 2014 onwards, Queen Elizabeth II, upon the recommendation of the premier, accorded all current, future, and living former governors the title "The Honourable" for life.

== Current holder ==
The current governor is diplomat Frances Adamson, who was sworn in at Government House, Adelaide on 7 October 2021. The new governor, Commissioner of Police Grant Stevens, will be sworn in on 9 December 2026.

== Role ==
Prior to self-government, the governor was responsible to the Government of the United Kingdom and was charged with implementing laws and policy. Currently, the governor is responsible for safeguarding the South Australian Constitution and facilitating the work of the Parliament and state government.

The governor exercises power on the advice of ministers, conveyed through the Executive Council. Constitutional powers bestowed upon the governor and used with the consent and advice of the Executive Council include:

- to appoint and dismiss ministers.
- exercising the prerogative of mercy.
- issuing regulations and proclamations under existing laws.
- giving royal assent to bills passed by Parliament.
- appointing judges, royal commissioners and senior public servants.
- dissolving Parliament and issuing writs for elections.

The governor additionally maintains 'reserve powers' which can be used without the consent of the Executive Council. These powers relate to the appointment and dismissal of ministers and Parliament.

Although not a responsibility of the office of Governor of South Australia, governors of South Australia are - like all Governors of the Australian states - normally given a dormant commission to administer the government of the Commonwealth of Australia in the absence from Australia, or the death, incapacity or removal from office of the Governor-General by the Sovereign. Some South Australian governors are also appointed as a Deputy of the Governor-General to perform certain responsibilities of the Governor-General while the Governor-General is present in Australia, but unable to perform them personally.

== Governor's standard ==
The governor standard of South Australia is the same design as the British blue ensign with the Union Flag at the upper left quarter. On the right side, the State Badge of South Australia, comprising a piping shrike in a golden disc, is surmounted by a crown. In 2024, this representation changed from a St Edward's Crown to a Tudor Crown.

If the standard is flying at Government House, on a vehicle or at an event, this indicates that the governor is present.

Past and present standards of the governor

1870–1876

1876–1904

1904–1975

1975–2024

2024–present

== Governor's awards and commendations ==
=== Awards ===
The governor of South Australia supports outstanding achievers within the South Australian community through the presentation of a number of annual awards:

- The Governor's Multicultural Awards recognise and celebrate South Australians who promote multiculturalism and increase the understanding of the benefits of cultural diversity in our community; administered by the Department of the premier and Cabinet through Multicultural Affairs. They are presented by the governor on the advice of an independent judging panel.
- The Governor's Aboriginal Youth Awards recognise young Aboriginal South Australians, aged between 15 and 29 years, who are showing potential and determination to achieve success, or who are excelling in their chosen field in one of three areas: Sport, Arts and Higher Education; delivered through a partnership between the Department of the Premier and Cabinet’s Aboriginal Affairs and Reconciliation division and the Office of the Governor.
- The Governor’s Civics Awards for Schools provide the opportunity for young South Australians to develop their understanding of the role citizenship plays in a multicultural and democratic society. The inaugural awards in 2019 had two categories: an individual and a group award for Year 5 students; in 2020, they expanded to include students from Years 5–12.

=== Commendations ===
The governor also awards a series of commendations for excellence in the SACE year 12 exams, including:

- Governor of South Australia Commendation – Excellence Award
- Governor of South Australia Commendation – Aboriginal Student SACE Excellence Award
- Governor of South Australia Commendation – Excellence in Modified SACE Award.

== List of governors of South Australia ==
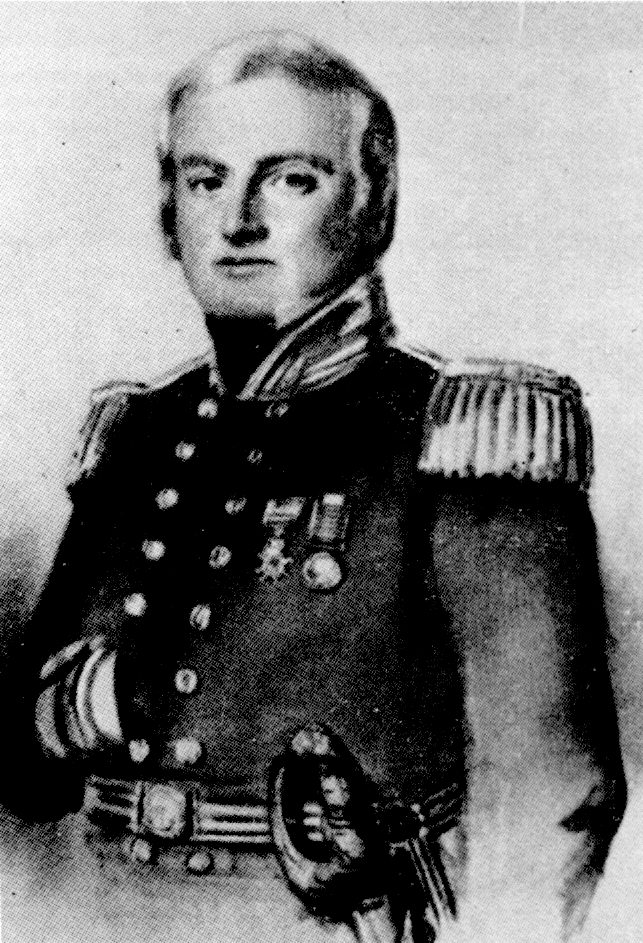
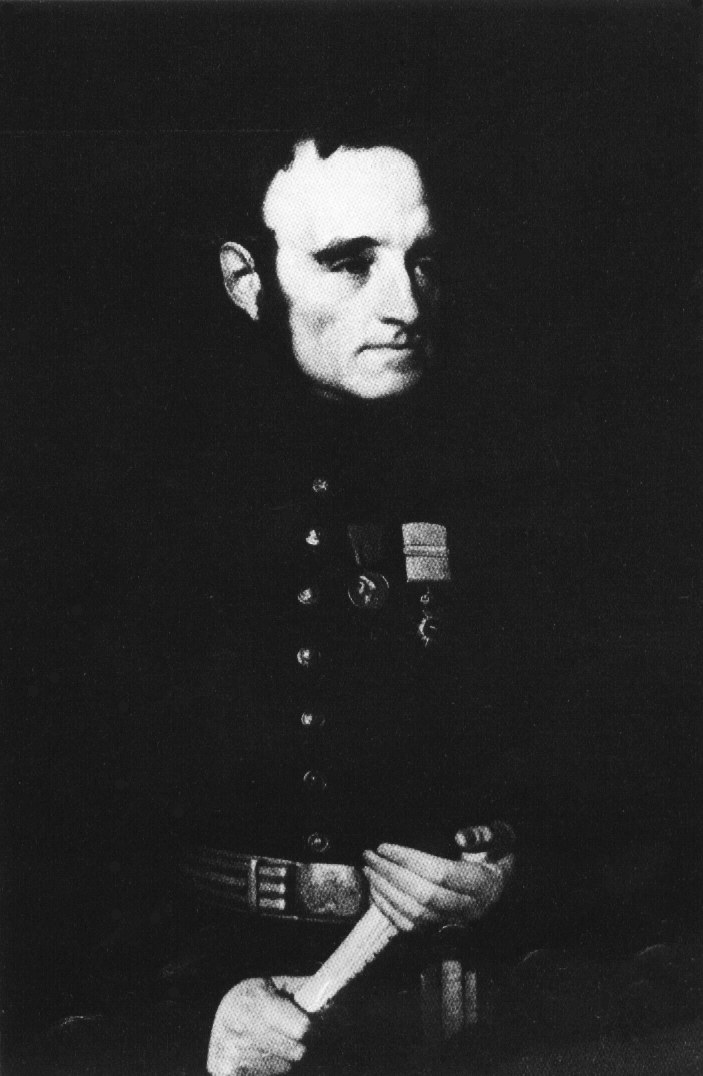
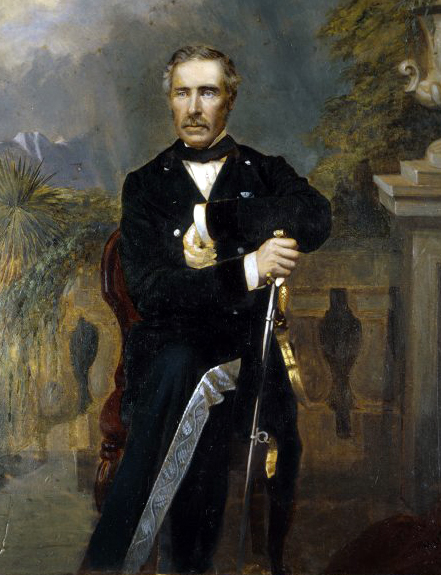
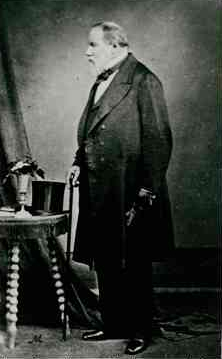
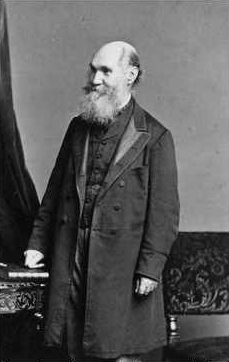
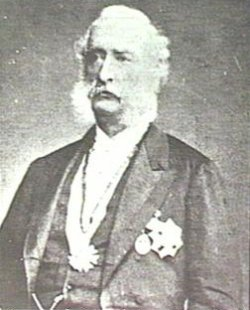
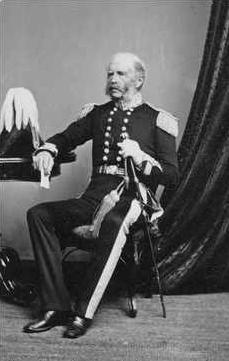
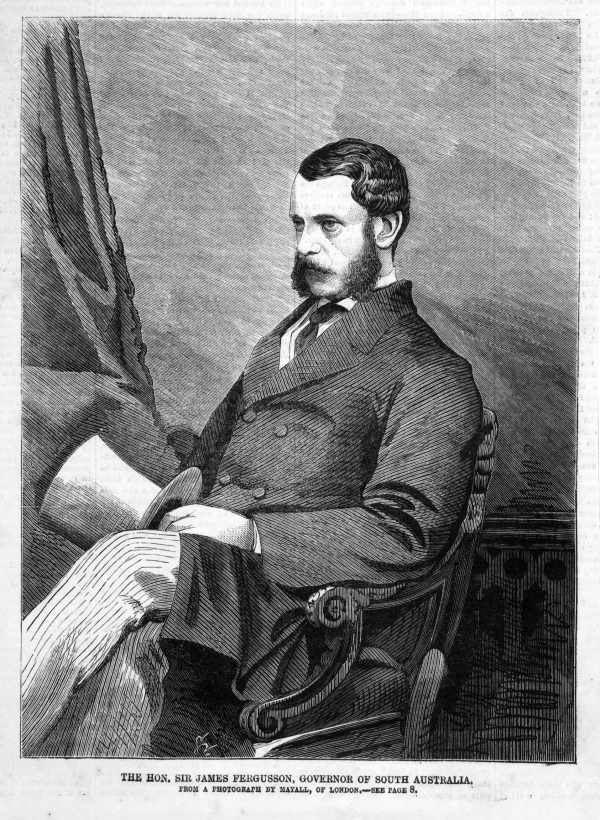
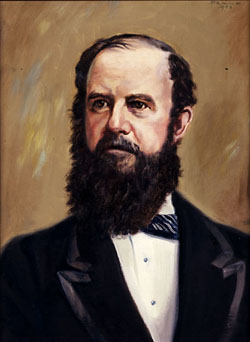
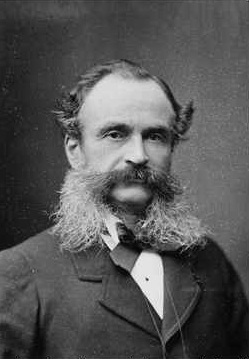
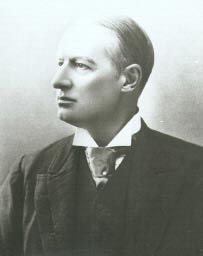
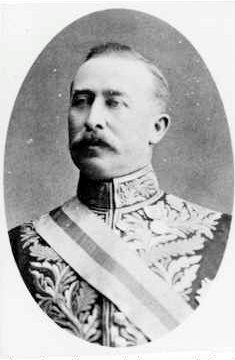
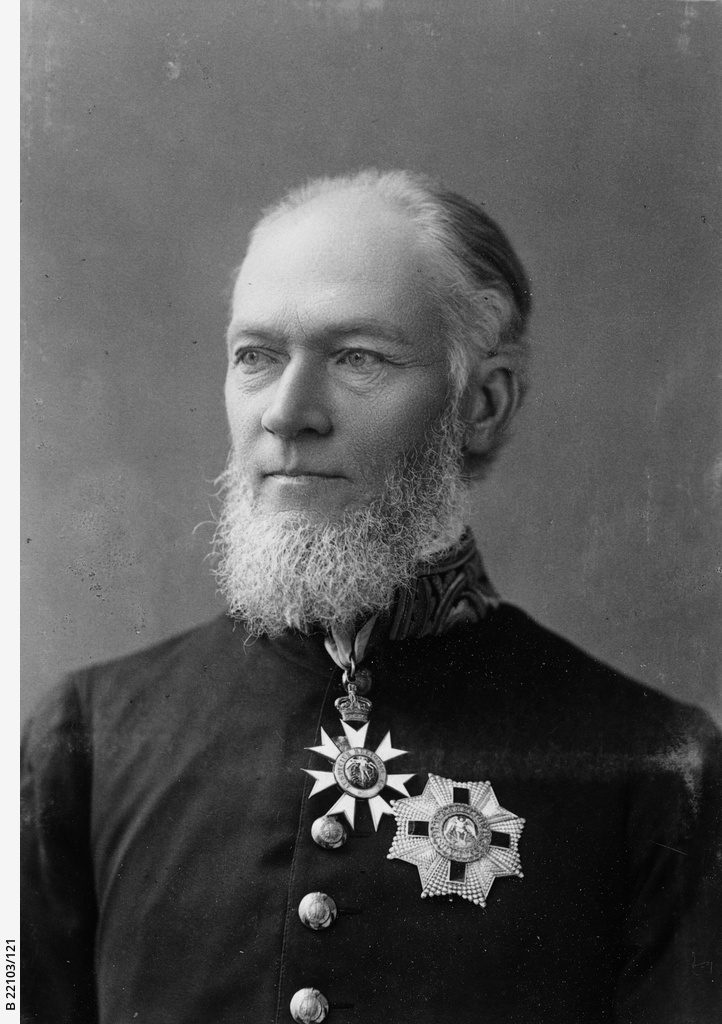
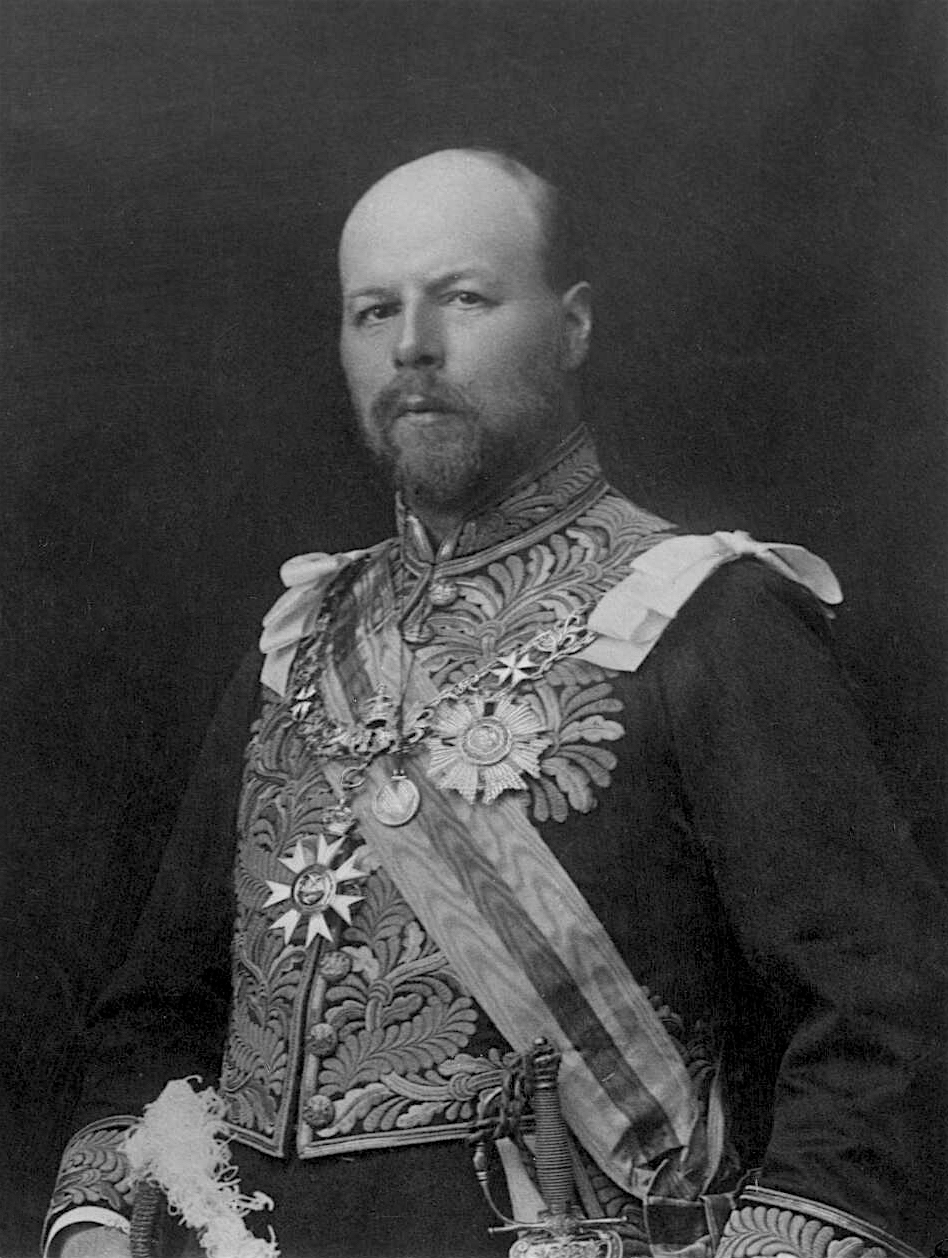
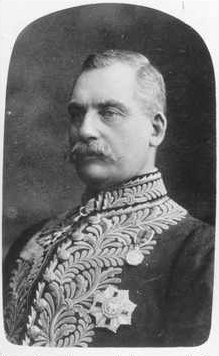
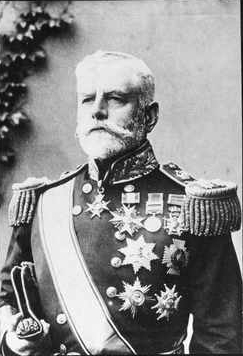
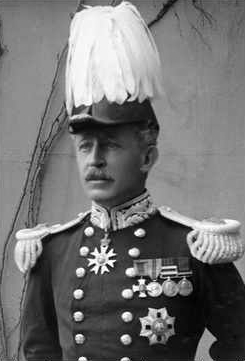
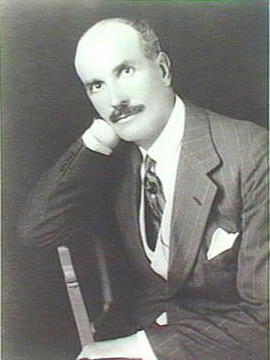
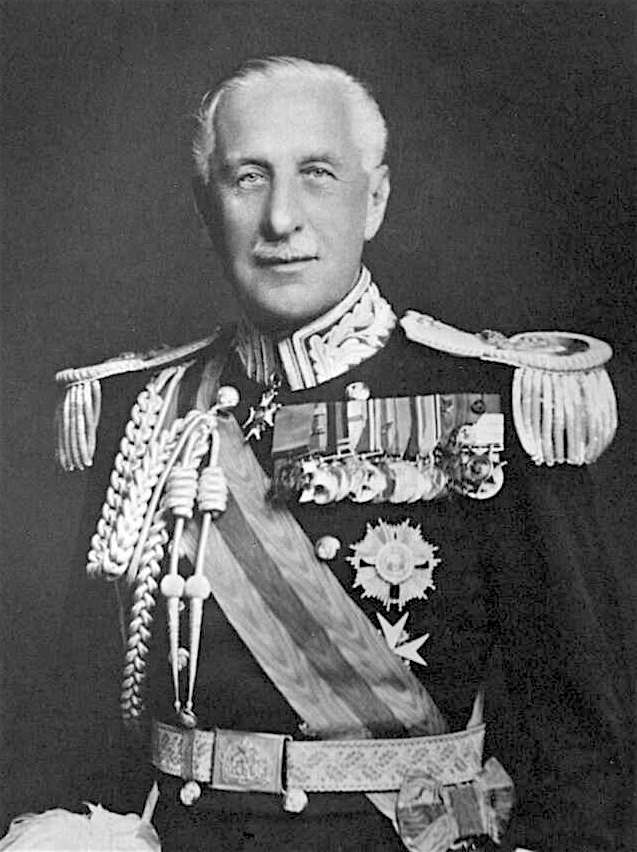
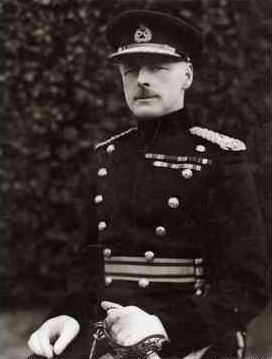
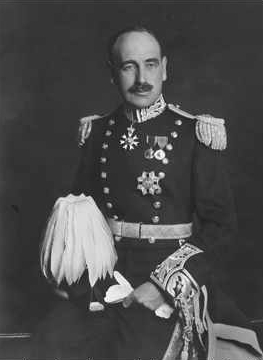
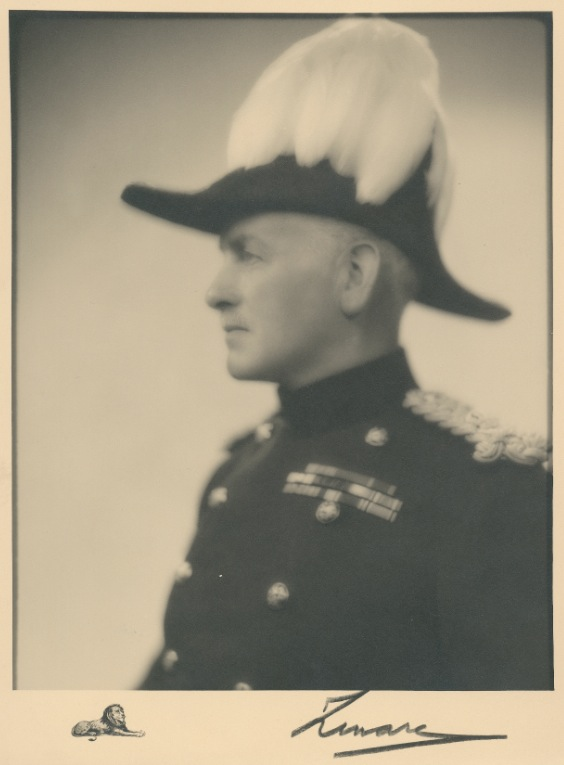
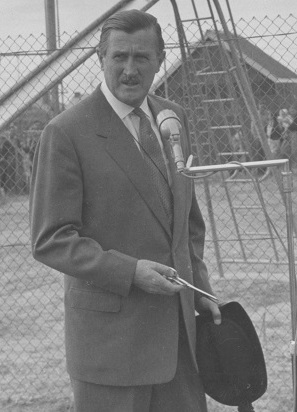
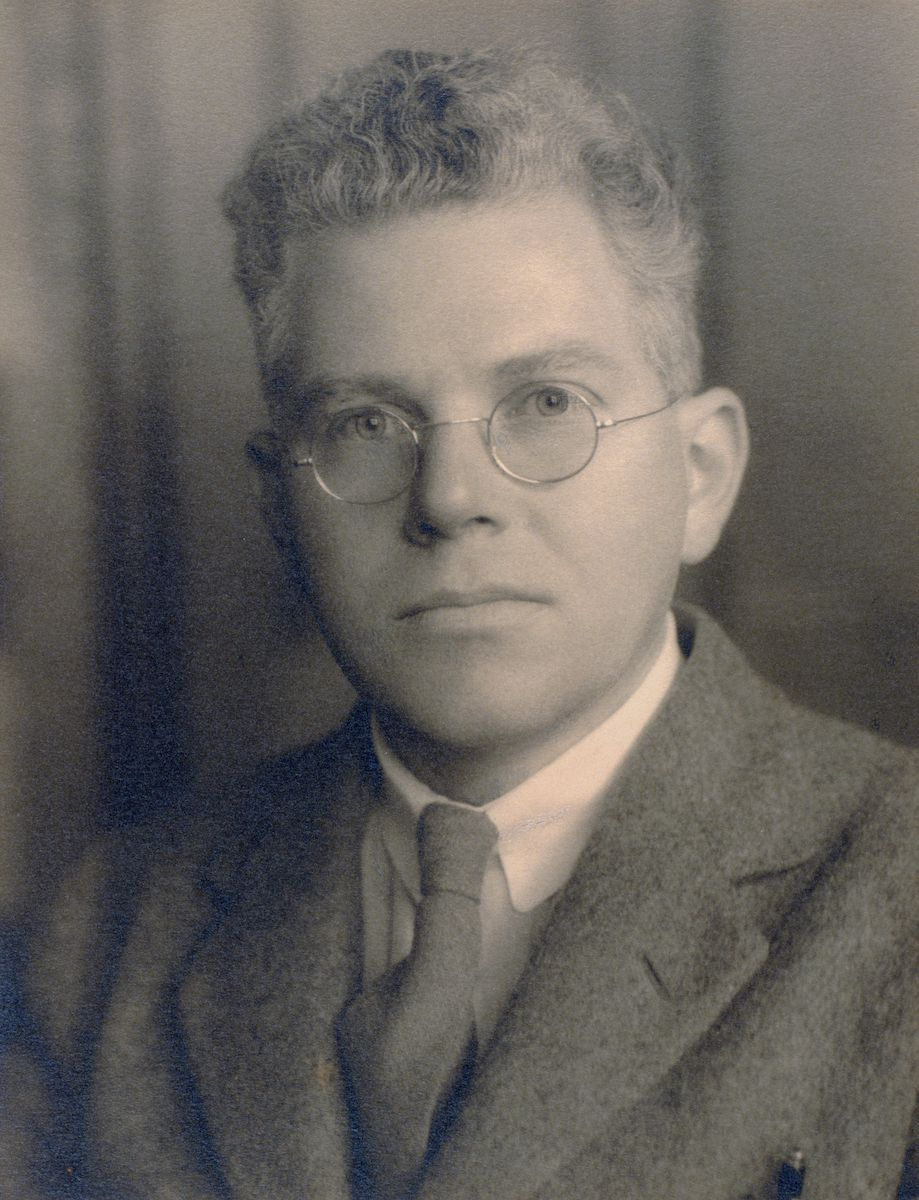
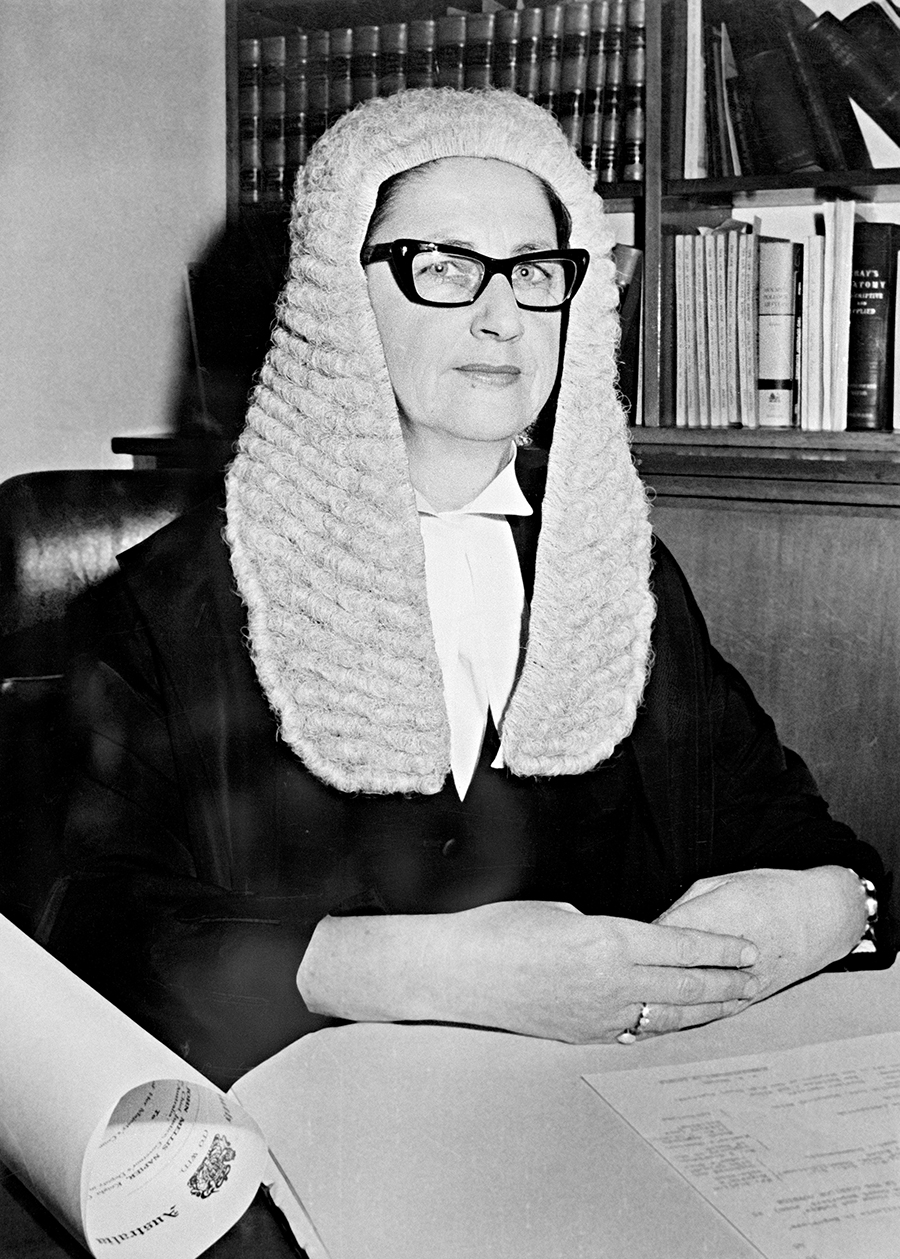
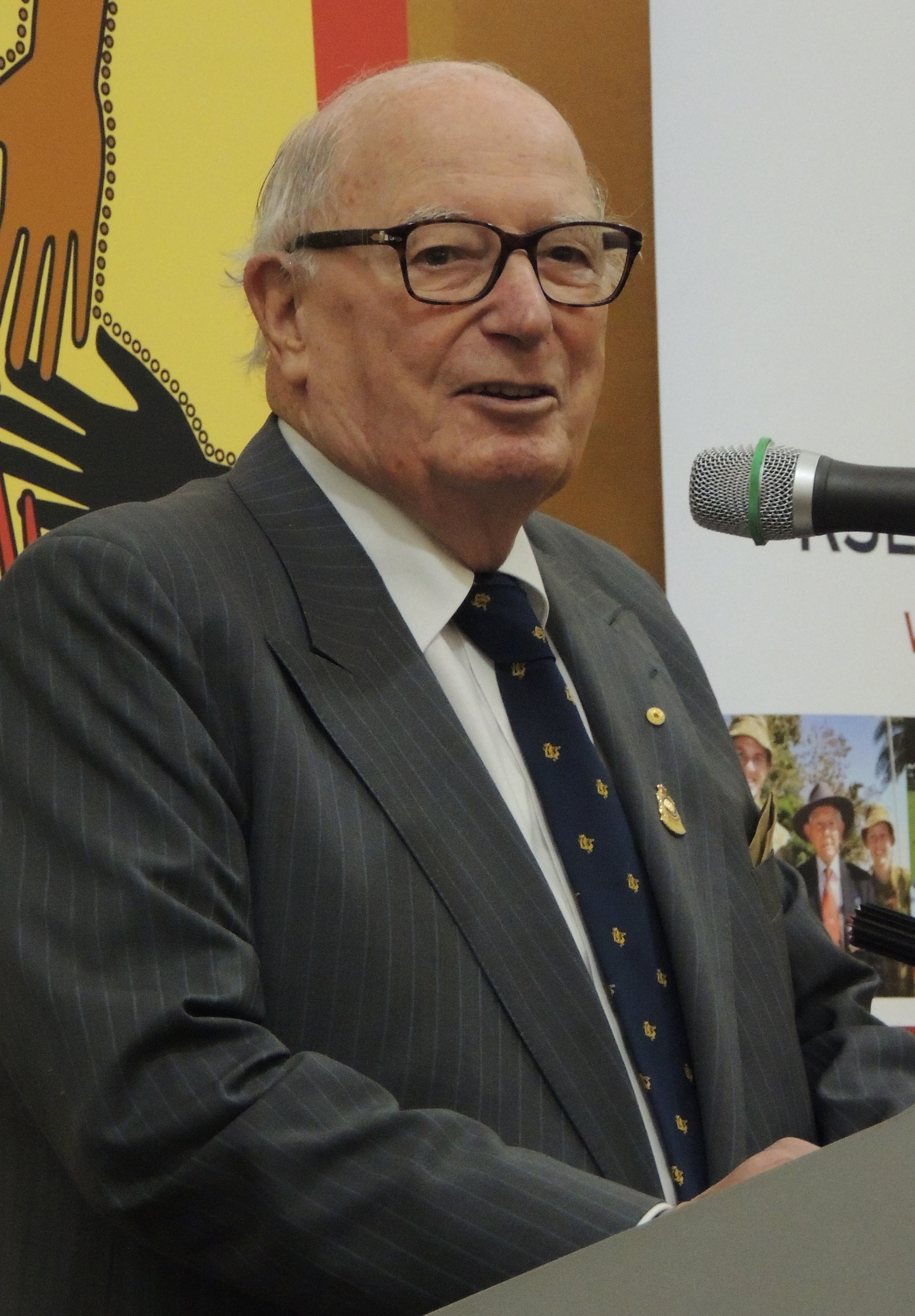
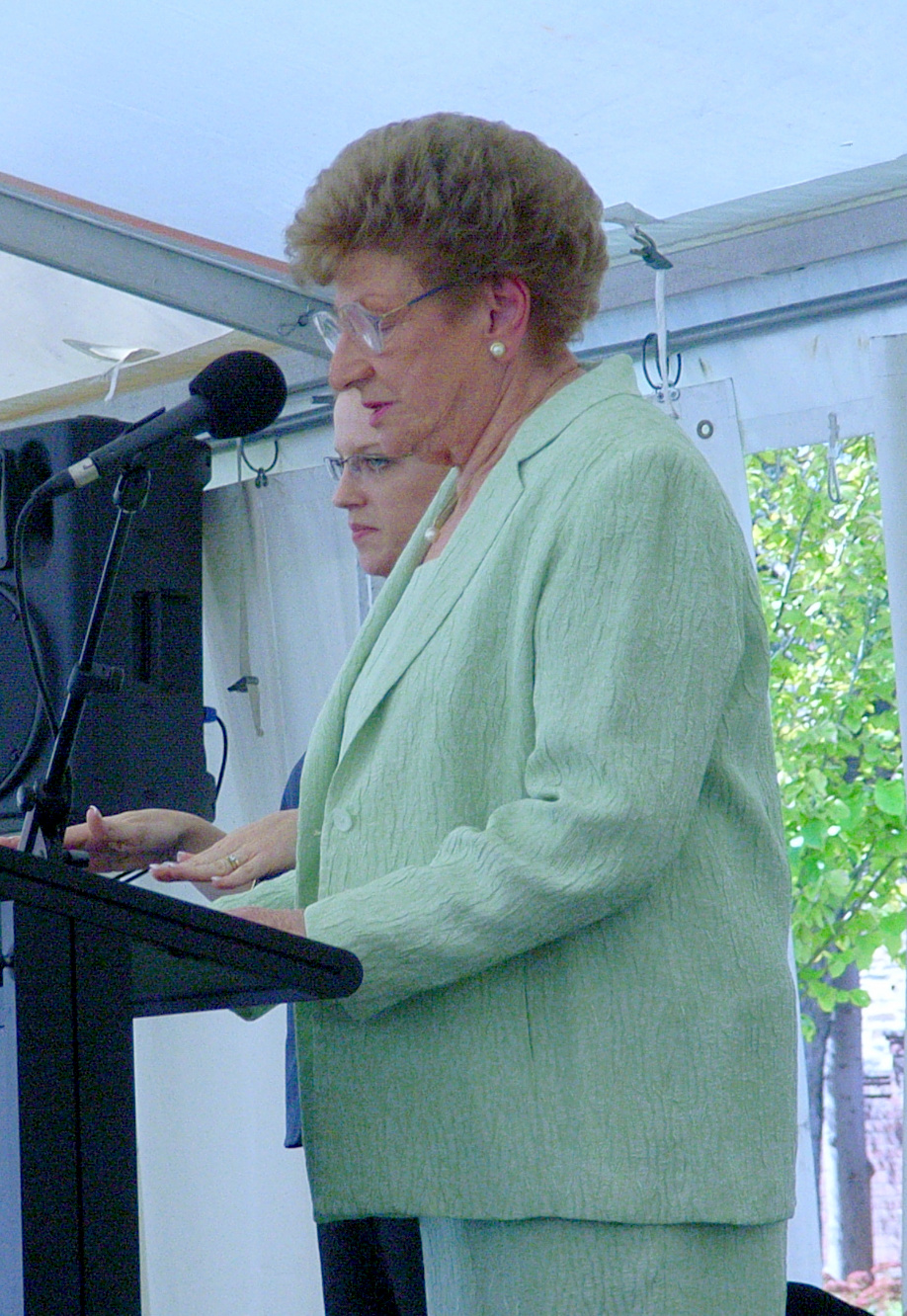
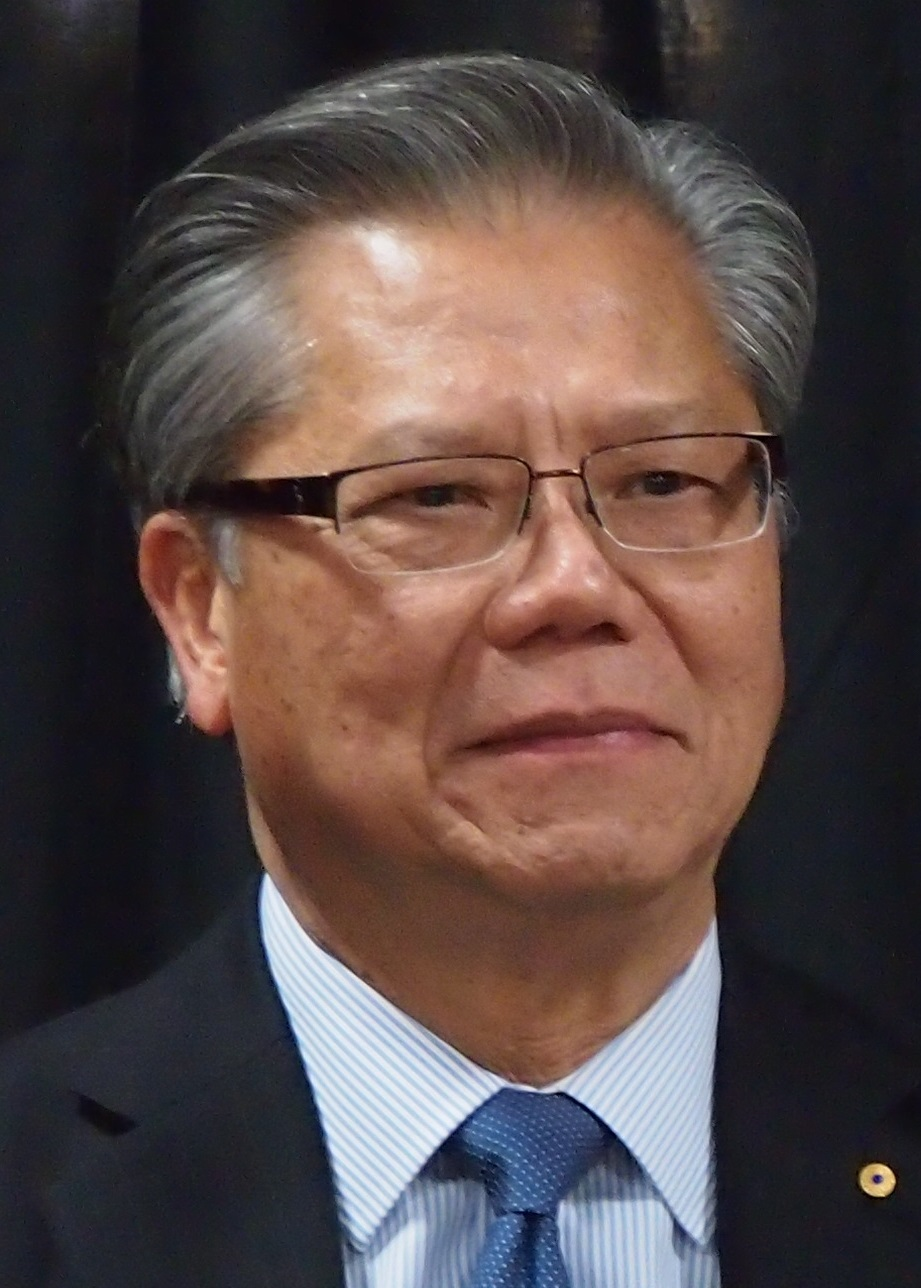
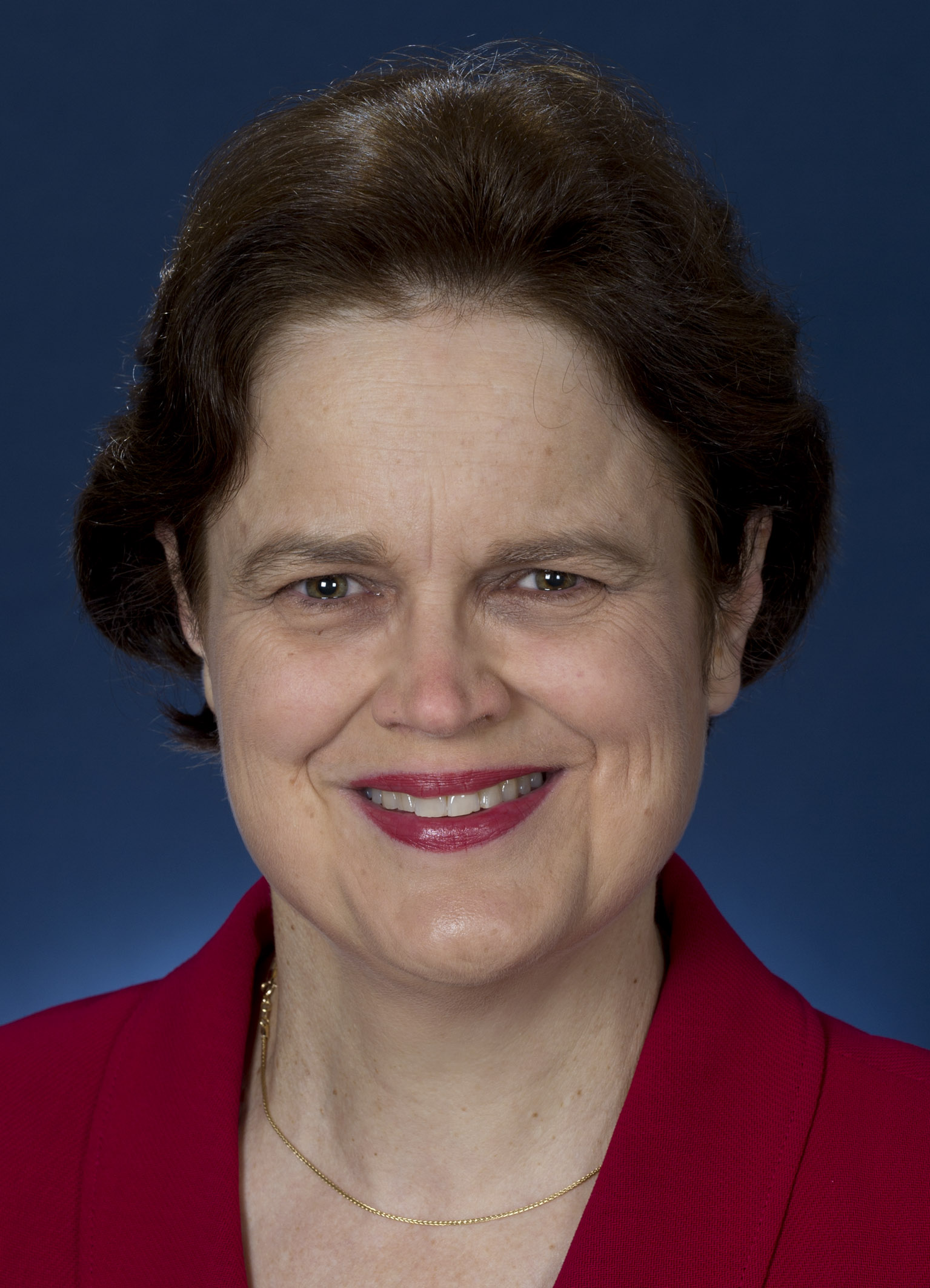
No.	Portrait	Governor	Prior career	Term begin	Term end	Time in office
Governor appointed by King William IV (1830–1837):
1		Rear Admiral Sir John Hindmarsh	Navy	28 December 1836	16 July 1838	1 year, 200 days
Governors appointed by Queen Victoria (1837–1901):
2		Lieutenant-Colonel George Gawler	Army	17 October 1838	15 May 1841	2 years, 210 days
3		Sir George Grey	Army	15 May 1841	25 October 1845	4 years, 163 days
4		Lieutenant-Colonel Frederick Holt Robe	Army	25 October 1845	2 August 1848	2 years, 282 days
5		Sir Henry Fox Young	Colonial administrator in the Caribbean	2 August 1848	20 December 1854	6 years, 140 days
6		Sir Richard Graves MacDonnell	Lawyer, judge and Governor of Gambia	8 June 1855	4 March 1862	6 years, 269 days
7		Sir Dominick Daly	Colonial administrator and Governor in the Caribbean and Canada	4 March 1862	19 February 1868	5 years, 352 days
8		Sir James Fergusson, 6th Baronet	Army, conservative politician, administrator	16 February 1869	18 April 1873	4 years, 61 days
9		Sir Anthony Musgrave	Colonial administrator and governor in Canada, the Caribbean and South Africa	9 June 1873	29 January 1877	3 years, 234 days
10		Lieutenant-General Sir William Jervois	Army engineer and planner of fortifications	2 October 1877	9 January 1883	5 years, 99 days
11		Sir William Robinson	President of Montserrat, colonial Governor in the Caribbean, Canada, Falkland Islands and Western Australia	19 February 1883	5 March 1889	6 years, 14 days
12		Algernon Keith-Falconer, 9th Earl of Kintore	Politician, Grand Master Freemason	11 April 1889	10 April 1895	5 years, 364 days
13		Sir Fowell Buxton, 3rd Baronet	Army, politician	29 October 1895	29 March 1899	3 years, 151 days
14		Hallam Tennyson, 2nd Baron Tennyson	Imperialist aristocrat	10 April 1899	17 July 1902	3 years, 98 days
Governors appointed by King Edward VII (1901–1910):
15		Sir George Le Hunte	President of Dominica, colonial administrator in the Caribbean, New Guinea and Mauritius	1 July 1903	18 February 1909	5 years, 232 days
16		Admiral Sir Day Bosanquet	Navy, Commander-in-Chief at several colonial postings	18 February 1909	22 March 1914	5 years, 32 days
Governors appointed by King George V (1910–1936):
17		Lieutenant Colonel Sir Henry Galway		18 April 1914	30 April 1920	6 years, 12 days
18		Lieutenant Colonel Sir Archibald Weigall		9 June 1920	30 May 1922	1 year, 355 days
19		Lieutenant-General Sir Tom Bridges		4 December 1922	4 December 1927	5 years, 0 days
20		Brigadier Sir Alexander Hore-Ruthven		14 May 1928	26 April 1934	5 years, 347 days
21		Major-General Sir Winston Dugan		28 July 1934	23 February 1939	4 years, 210 days
Governors appointed by King George VI (1936–1952):
22		Sir Malcolm Barclay-Harvey		12 August 1939	26 April 1944	4 years, 258 days
23		Lieutenant-General Sir Willoughby Norrie		19 December 1944	19 June 1952	7 years, 183 days
Governors appointed by Queen Elizabeth II (1952–2022):
24		Air Vice-Marshal Sir Robert George	Airforce	23 February 1953	7 March 1960	7 years, 13 days
25		Lieutenant-General Sir Edric Bastyan	Army	4 April 1961	1 June 1968	7 years, 58 days
26		Major General Sir James Harrison	Army, first Australian-born to become Governor of South Australia	4 December 1968	16 September 1971	2 years, 286 days
27		Professor Sir Mark Oliphant	Research physicist, contributor to the development of nuclear weapons	1 December 1971	30 November 1976	4 years, 365 days
28		Sir Douglas Nicholls	Athlete, minister and social worker	1 December 1976	30 April 1977	150 days
29		Reverend Sir Keith Seaman	Methodist and Uniting Church minister	1 September 1977	28 March 1982	4 years, 208 days
30		Lieutenant General Sir Donald Dunstan	Australian Army officer	23 April 1982	5 February 1991	8 years, 288 days
31		Dame Roma Mitchell	Lawyer, judge, university chancellor	6 February 1991	21 July 1996	5 years, 166 days
32		Sir Eric Neal	Engineer, businessman	22 July 1996	3 November 2001	5 years, 104 days
33		Marjorie Jackson-Nelson	Olympic athlete, sports administrator	3 November 2001	31 July 2007	5 years, 242 days
34		Rear Admiral Kevin Scarce	Navy	8 August 2007	7 August 2014	6 years, 364 days
35		Hieu Van Le	Accountant, businessman, refugee	1 September 2014	31 August 2021	6 years, 364 days
36		Frances Adamson	Diplomat (DFAT)	7 October 2021	6 October 2026	5 years, 62 days
(acting)		Richard Harris	Doctor	6 October 2026	Acting
37		Grant Stevens	Police Commissioner	9 December 2026	Designate

== Administrators and Lieutenant Governors ==
These people administered the government in the absence of the official governor.

Administrator	Term
George Milner Stephen	1838
Boyle Travers Finniss	1854–55
Lt.-Col. Francis Gilbert Hamley	1868–69
Major James Harwood Rocke	1870
Sir Richard Davies Hanson, Chief Justice	1872–73
Sir William Wellington Cairns	1877
Samuel James Way, Chief Justice, Lt.-Gov.	1877 to 1915 (on 65 separate occasions)
James Penn Boucaut, Judge of Supreme Court	1885, 1886, 1888, 1890, 1891, 1897
William Henry Bundey, Judge of Supreme Court	1888
Sir George John Robert Murray, Chief Justice, Lt.-Gov.	1916–24, 1926–42 (on 103 separate occasions)
Thomas Slaney Poole, Judge of Supreme Court	1925 (on 2 occasions)
Sir Herbert Angas Parsons, Judge of Supreme Court	1935 to 1942 (on 6 separate occasions)
Sir John Mellis Napier, Chief Justice, Lt.-Gov.	1942 to 1973 (on 179 separate occasions)
Sir Herbert Mayo, Judge of Supreme Court	1946 to 1965 (on 25 separate occasions)
Sir Geoffrey Sandford Reed, Judge of Supreme Court	1951 to 1957 (on 5 separate occasions)
John Jefferson Bray, Chief Justice	1968 to 1973 (on 8 separate occasions)
David Stirling Hogarth, Judge of Supreme Court	1971
Sir Walter Crocker, Lt.-Gov.	1973 to 1982 (on 29 separate occasions)
Sir Condor Laucke, Lt.-Gov.	1982 to 1992 (on 43 separate occasions)
Leonard James King, Chief Justice	1987
Basil Hetzel, Lt.-Gov.	1992 to 2000 (on 32 separate occasions)
John Doyle, Chief Justice	1999–2012 (on 10 separate occasions)
Bruno Krumins, Lt.-Gov.	2000–2007 (on 60 separate occasions)
John William Perry, Judge of Supreme Court	2002
Hieu Van Le, Lt.-Gov.	2007–2014
Brenda Wilson, Lt.-Gov.	2014–2022
James Muecke, Lt.-Gov.	2022–February 2024
Richard Harris, Lt-Gov.	9 February 2024–
Laura Stein, Chief Justice	2026
