= Candidates of the 1985 South Australian state election =

The 1985 South Australian state election was held on 7 December 1985.

== Retiring Members ==
=== Labor ===
- Max Brown MHA (Whyalla)
- George Whitten MHA (Price)
- Jack Wright MHA (Adelaide)
- Cec Creedon MLC

=== Liberal ===
- Allan Rodda MHA (Victoria)
- Ren DeGaris MLC

=== Democrats ===
- Lance Milne MLC

== House of Assembly ==
Sitting members are shown in bold text. Successful candidates are highlighted in the relevant colour. Where there is possible confusion, an asterisk (*) is also used.

Electorate	Held by	Labor candidate	Liberal candidate	Democrats candidate	Other candidates
Adelaide	Liberal	Mike Duigan	**Michael Wilson**	Christopher Wurm	
Albert Park	Labor	**Kevin Hamilton**	Bob MacKenzie	John Malone	
Alexandra	Liberal	John Quirke	**Ted Chapman**	David Willson	Rex Tilbrook (Nat)
Baudin	Labor	**Don Hopgood**	Bill Fraser	D. Perrotin	Mort Daly (Ind)
Bragg	Liberal	Phil Robins	**Graham Ingerson**	Alison Dolling	
Briggs	Labor	Mike Rann	Bernhard Buchner	Anastasios Giannouklas	David Whiting (Ind)
Bright	Liberal	Derek Robertson	**John Mathwin**	Fred Cannon	
Chaffey	Liberal	Bill Parsons	**Peter Arnold**	Rilda Sharp	
Coles	Liberal	Ray Rains	**Jennifer Adamson**	Sandra Nichols	Aniello Carbone (Ind)
Custance	Liberal	Arthur Rich	**John Olsen**	John Smyth	
Davenport	Liberal	Mark Boughey	**Dean Brown**	Kevin Angove	**Stan Evans** (Ind Lib)
Elizabeth	Independent Labor	Sonia Argirov	Josephine Gapper	Carolyn Tan	**Martyn Evans** (Ind Lib)
Eyre	Liberal	Jennie Lee	**Graham Gunn**	Jillian Polkinghorne	
Fisher	Liberal	Philip Tyler	Grant Chapman	Audrey Sibly	
Flinders	National	Terrence Krieg	Arthur Whyte	George Jukes	**Peter Blacker** (Nat)
Florey	Labor	**Bob Gregory**	Martin Luther	Andrew Sickerdick	
Gilles	Labor	**Jack Slater**	Lois Bell	Brian Fain	
Goyder	Liberal	Michael Wright	**John Meier**	Rosemary Dow	
Hanson	Liberal	Ann Pengelly	**Heini Becker**	Ian Haines	
Hartley	Labor	**Terry Groom**	Rilka Warbanoff	Cathi Tucker-Lee	
Hayward	Labor	**June Appleby**	Julian Glynn	John Stapledon	
Henley Beach	Labor	**Don Ferguson**	Bob Randall	Gladys Wells	Joe Rossi (Ind)
Heysen	Liberal	Elizabeth Harvey	**David Wotton**	Merilyn Pedrick	Douglas Lindley (Nat)
Kavel	Liberal	Lance Jones	**Roger Goldsworthy**		Paul Reader (Ind)
Light	Liberal	Tony Piccolo	**Bruce Eastick**	Nicholas Wedge	Eric Gerlach (Ind)
Mawson	Labor	**Susan Lenehan**	Raija Havu	Tim Wells	
Mitcham	Liberal	Barbara Hughes	**Stephen Baker**	Guy Harley	
Mitchell	Labor	**Ron Payne**	Mark Hanckel	Peter Mann	
Morphett	Liberal	Trevor Peikert	**John Oswald**	Sue Carver	
Mount Gambier	Liberal	Peter Humphries	**Harold Allison**	Glenn Taylor	
Murray-Mallee	Liberal	Peter Dickson	**Peter Lewis**	Don French	Gavin Doecke (Nat); Steve Wilkinson (Ind)
Napier	Labor	**Terry Hemmings**	Brenda Bates	Barbara Barlow	John Campbell (Ind)
Newland	Liberal	Di Gayler	**Scott Ashenden**	Mike Bolt	
Norwood	Labor	**Greg Crafter**	Sue Graham	Rodney Roberts	
Peake	Labor	**Keith Plunkett**	Steve Peake	Jeff Wild	Ian Frances (Ind)
Playford	Labor	**Terry McRae**	Dorothy Kotz	Eileen Farmer	
Price	Labor	Murray De Laine	Jean Lawrie	Don Bond	
Ramsay	Labor	**Lynn Arnold**	Jim Davis		
Ross Smith	Labor	**John Bannon**	Darryl Watson	Kate Hannaford	
Semaphore	Independent Labor	Rod Sawford	Mark Laing	F. Goncalves	**Norm Peterson** (Ind Lab)
Spence	Labor	**Roy Abbott**	Joe Ryan	Elizabeth Sanderson	
Stuart	Labor	**Gavin Keneally**	Bob Smith	Harm Folkers	Peter Clark (Ind)
Todd	Labor	**John Klunder**	Jeff Nicholas	Aussie Kanck	
Unley	Labor	**Kym Mayes**	Denis Sheridan	Barbara Boden	Peter Kallas (Ind)
Victoria	Liberal	Bill Hender	Dale Baker	Roy Milne	Geoff Clothier (Nat)
Walsh	Labor	**John Trainer**	Lenore Triplow	Helen Brasted	Reece Jennings (Ind)
Whyalla	Labor	Frank Blevins	Laurie Wilks	Graham Gloede	Jack Berry (NDP); Andy Fleming (Ind); Peter Murphy (Ind Lab); Fred Wilson (Nat)

== Legislative Council ==
Sitting members are shown in bold text. Tickets that elected at least one MLC are highlighted in the relevant colour. Successful candidates are identified by an asterisk (*). Eleven seats were up for election. Labor were defending five seats. The Liberals were defending five seats. The Democrats were defending one seat.

Labor candidates	Liberal candidates	Democrats candidates	Nationals SA candidates	CTA candidates	NDP candidates	Other candidates
1. **Brian Chatterton***; 2. **Gordon Bruce***; 3. **Barbara Wiese***; 4. Terry Roberts*; 5. Carolyn Pickles*; 6. Colleen Hutchison; 7. Brian Smith; 8. Denis Crisp	1. **Trevor Griffin***; 2. **Legh Davis***; 3. **Robert Ritson***; 4. Jamie Irwin*; 5. John Burdett*; 6. Sue Crew; 7. Alan Ferguson	1. Mike Elliott*; 2. Heather Southcott; 3. Donald Chisholm; 4. Meg Lees; 5. Sandra Kanck; 6. Anthony Roberts	1. Kelly Carter; 2. Robin Dixon-Thompson; 3. Neville Agars; 4. Donald Hunt	1. Robert Brown; 2. William Pomery; 3. Cathryn Linedale; 4. Carl Wieland; 5. Wayne Ledger; 6. David Aitken; 7. William Wright	1. Frances Mowling; 2. Ian Modistach	Stephen Dimitriou; Josephine Mountwinter
