= Results of the 1985 South Australian state election (Legislative Council) =

South Australian state election, 7 December 1985 Legislative Council << 1982–1989 >>
Enrolled voters	905,507				
Votes cast	846,250		Turnout	93.46	+0.67
Informal votes	31,312		Informal	3.70	–6.37
Summary of votes by party
Party	Primary votes	%	Swing	Seats won	Seats held
Labor	391,076	47.99	+0.40	5	10
Liberal	320,055	39.27	–2.15	5	10
Democrats	44,988	5.52	–0.04	1	2
Call to Australia	24,666	3.03	+3.03	0	0
National	13,276	1.63	–0.37	0	0
Nuclear Disarmament	12,098	1.48	+1.48	0	0
Other	8,779	1.08	*	0	0
Total	814,938			11	22

This is a list of results for the Legislative Council at the 1985 South Australian state election.

== Continuing members ==
The following MLCs were not up for re-election this year.

Member	Party	Term
Martin Cameron	Liberal	1982–1989
Peter Dunn	Liberal	1982–1989
Murray Hill	Liberal	1982–1988
Diana Laidlaw	Liberal	1982–1989
Rob Lucas	Liberal	1982–1989
John Cornwall	Labor	1982–1989
Mario Feleppa	Labor	1982–1989
Anne Levy	Labor	1982–1989
Chris Sumner	Labor	1982–1989
vacant seat	Labor	1982–1989
Ian Gilfillan	Democrats	1982–1989

== Election results ==
1985 South Australian state election: Legislative Council
Party	Candidate	Votes	%	±%
Quota		67,912		
Labor	1. Brian Chatterton (elected 1); 2. Gordon Bruce (elected 3); 3. Barbara Wiese (elected 5); 4. Terry Roberts (elected 7); 5. Carolyn Pickles (elected 9); 6. Colleen Hutchison; 7. Brian Smith; 8. Denis Crisp	391,076	48.0	+0.4
Liberal	1. Trevor Griffin (elected 2); 2. Legh Davis (elected 4); 3. Robert Ritson (elected 6); 4. Jamie Irwin (elected 8); 5. John Burdett (elected 10); 6. Sue Crew; 7. Alan Ferguson	320,055	39.3	−2.2
Democrats	1. Mike Elliott (elected 11); 2. Heather Southcott; 3. Donald Chisholm; 4. Meg Lees; 5. Sandra Kanck; 6. Anthony Roberts	44,988	5.5	−0.1
Call to Australia	1. Robert Brown; 2. William Pomery; 3. Cathryn Linedale; 4. Carl Wieland; 5. Wayne Ledger; 6. David Aitken; 7. William Wright	24,666	3.0	+3.0
National	1. Kelvin Carter; 2. Robin Dixon-Thompson; 3. Neville Agars; 4. Donald Hunt	13,276	1.6	−0.4
Nuclear Disarmament	1. Frances Mowling; 2. Ian Modistach	11,986	1.5	+1.5
Independent	Stephen Dimitriou	8,337	1.0	+1.0
Independent	Josephine Mountwinter	442	0.1	+0.1
Total formal votes		814,938	96.3	+6.4
Informal votes		31,312	3.7	−6.4
Turnout		846,250	93.5	+0.7

== See also ==
- Candidates of the 1985 South Australian state election
- Members of the South Australian Legislative Council, 1985–1989
