= Results of the 1985 South Australian state election (House of Assembly) =

South Australian state election, 7 December 1985 House of Assembly << 1982–1989 >>
Enrolled voters	905,507				
Votes cast	846,289		Turnout	93.46	+0.28
Informal votes	29,401		Informal	3.47	–2.31
Summary of votes by party
Party	Primary votes	%	Swing	Seats	Change
Labor	393,652	48.19	+1.91	27	+ 3
Liberal	344,337	42.15	–0.52	16	– 5
Democrats	34,732	4.25	–2.87	0	± 0
National	14,056	1.72	–0.60	1	± 0
Independent Labor	18,641	2.28	*	2	+ 2
Independent	5,368	0.66	–0.94	0	– 1
Independent Liberal	5,224	0.64	*	1	+ 1
Other	878	0.11	*	0	± 0
Total	816,888			47	
Two-party-preferred
Labor	434,325	53.17	+2.23		
Liberal	382,563	46.83	–2.23		

This is a list of House of Assembly results for the 1985 South Australian state election.

== Results by electoral district ==
=== Adelaide ===
1985 South Australian state election: Adelaide
Party	Candidate	Votes	%	±%
Labor	Mike Duigan	7,875	47.3	+4.3
Liberal	Michael Wilson	7,849	47.2	−3.8
Democrats	Christopher Wurm	916	5.5	−0.6
Total formal votes		16,640	97.3	
Informal votes		458	2.7	
Turnout		17,098	89.4	
Two-party-preferred result
Labor	Mike Duigan	8,414	50.6	+3.4
Liberal	Michael Wilson	8,226	49.4	−3.4
Labor hold		Swing	+3.4	

- Adelaide became a notionally Liberal held seat in the redistribution. Michael Wilson was the sitting member for the abolished district of Torrens.

=== Albert Park ===
1985 South Australian state election: Albert Park
Party	Candidate	Votes	%	±%
Labor	Kevin Hamilton	11,015	60.1	−0.9
Liberal	Bob MacKenzie	6,525	35.6	+1.6
Democrats	John Malone	795	4.3	−0.7
Total formal votes		18,335	96.9	
Informal votes		585	3.1	
Turnout		18,920	94.2	
Two-party-preferred result
Labor	Kevin Hamilton	11,530	62.9	−1.1
Liberal	Bob MacKenzie	6,805	37.1	+1.1
Labor hold		Swing	−1.1	

=== Alexandra ===
1985 South Australian state election: Alexandra
Party	Candidate	Votes	%	±%
Liberal	Ted Chapman	9,938	56.0	−10.0
Labor	John Quirke	5,241	29.5	+9.5
National	Rex Tilbrook	1,363	7.7	+2.7
Democrats	David Willson	1,215	6.8	−2.2
Total formal votes		17,757	94.9	
Informal votes		951	5.1	
Turnout		18,708	94.1	
Two-party-preferred result
Liberal	Ted Chapman	11,577	65.2	−9.8
Labor	John Quirke	6,180	34.8	+9.8
Liberal hold		Swing	−9.8	

=== Baudin ===
1985 South Australian state election: Baudin
Party	Candidate	Votes	%	±%
Labor	Don Hopgood	10,681	60.2	+2.2
Liberal	Bill Fraser	5,831	32.9	+0.9
Democrats	D Perrotin	883	5.0	−5.0
Independent	Mort Daly	339	1.9	+1.9
Total formal votes		17,734	96.2	
Informal votes		699	3.8	
Turnout		18,433	91.9	
Two-party-preferred result
Labor	Don Hopgood	11,296	63.7	+0.7
Liberal	Bill Fraser	6,438	36.3	−0.7
Labor hold		Swing	−0.7	

=== Bragg ===
1985 South Australian state election: Bragg
Party	Candidate	Votes	%	±%
Liberal	Graham Ingerson	11,719	65.1	−2.9
Labor	Phil Robins	5,315	29.5	+7.5
Democrats	Alison Dolling	978	5.4	−4.6
Total formal votes		18,012	98.0	
Informal votes		368	2.0	
Turnout		18,380	91.9	
Two-party-preferred result
Liberal	Graham Ingerson	12,166	67.5	−5.5
Labor	Phil Robins	5,846	32.5	+5.5
Liberal hold		Swing	−5.5	

=== Briggs ===
1985 South Australian state election: Briggs
Party	Candidate	Votes	%	±%
Labor	Mike Rann	9,142	56.6	−4.4
Liberal	Bernhard Buchner	4,430	27.4	−2.6
Independent	David Whiting	1,818	11.3	+11.3
Democrats	Anastasios Giannouklas	766	4.7	−4.3
Total formal votes		16,156	95.9	
Informal votes		687	4.1	
Turnout		16,843	92.8	
Two-party-preferred result
Labor	Mike Rann	10,894	67.4	+1.4
Liberal	Bernhard Buchner	5,262	32.6	−1.4
Labor hold		Swing	+1.4	

=== Bright ===
1985 South Australian state election: Bright
Party	Candidate	Votes	%	±%
Labor	Derek Robertson	9,048	49.5	+3.5
Liberal	John Mathwin	8,569	46.8	−0.1
Democrats	Fred Cannon	674	3.7	−3.3
Total formal votes		18,291	97.9	
Informal votes		390	2.1	
Turnout		18,681	95.3	
Two-party-preferred result
Labor	Derek Robertson	9,430	51.6	+2.6
Liberal	John Mathwin	8,861	48.4	−2.6
Labor gain from Liberal		Swing	+2.6	

=== Chaffey ===
1985 South Australian state election: Chaffey
Party	Candidate	Votes	%	±%
Liberal	Peter Arnold	10,937	63.5	+1.5
Labor	Bill Parsons	5,428	31.5	+1.5
Democrats	Rilda Sharp	847	4.9	−3.1
Total formal votes		17,212	97.6	
Informal votes		427	2.4	
Turnout		17,639	89.9	
Two-party-preferred result
Liberal	Peter Arnold	11,415	66.3	+0.3
Labor	Bill Parsons	5,797	33.7	−0.3
Liberal hold		Swing	+0.3	

=== Coles ===
1985 South Australian state election: Coles
Party	Candidate	Votes	%	±%
Liberal	Jennifer Adamson	8,855	54.7	−0.3
Labor	Ray Rains	6,233	38.5	+1.5
Democrats	Sandra Nichols	949	5.9	−2.1
Independent	Aniello Carbone	142	0.9	+0.9
Total formal votes		16,179	96.6	
Informal votes		576	3.4	
Turnout		16,755	93.8	
Two-party-preferred result
Liberal	Jennifer Adamson	9,445	58.4	−0.6
Labor	Ray Rains	6,734	41.6	+0.6
Liberal hold		Swing	−0.6	

=== Custance ===
1985 South Australian state election: Custance
Party	Candidate	Votes	%	±%
Liberal	John Olsen	10,611	63.0	−1.0
Labor	Arthur Rich	5,236	31.0	+3.0
Democrats	John Smyth	1,010	6.0	+1.0
Total formal votes		16,857	97.6	
Informal votes		412	2.4	
Turnout		17,269	95.2	
Two-party-preferred result
Liberal	John Olsen	11,184	66.3	−3.7
Labor	Arthur Rich	5,673	33.7	+3.7
Liberal hold		Swing	−3.7	

=== Davenport ===
1985 South Australian state election: Davenport
Party	Candidate	Votes	%	±%
Liberal	Dean Brown	6,991	40.6	−25.4
Independent Liberal	Stan Evans	5,224	30.3	+30.3
Labor	Mark Boughey	4,307	25.0	+3.0
Democrats	Kevin Angove	711	4.1	−7.9
Total formal votes		17,233	98.2	
Informal votes		309	1.8	
Turnout		17,542	93.7	
Two-party-preferred result
Liberal	Dean Brown	11,943	69.3	−2.7
Labor	Mark Boughey	5,290	30.7	+2.7
Two-candidate-preferred result
Independent Liberal	Stan Evans	9,062	52.6	+52.6
Liberal	Dean Brown	8,171	47.4	−24.6
Independent Liberal gain from Liberal		Swing	+52.6	

=== Elizabeth ===
1985 South Australian state election: Elizabeth
Party	Candidate	Votes	%	±%
Labor	Sonia Argirov	6,508	43.0	−26.0
Independent Labor	Martyn Evans	5,500	36.2	+36.2
Liberal	Josephine Gapper	2,692	17.8	−2.2
Democrats	Carolyn Tan	452	3.0	−8.0
Total formal votes		15,152	96.1	
Informal votes		610	3.9	
Turnout		15,762	92.6	
Two-party-preferred result
Labor	Sonia Argirov	11,061	73.0	−1.0
Liberal	Josephine Gapper	4,091	27.0	+1.0
Two-candidate-preferred result
Independent Labor	Martyn Evans	8,179	54.0	+54.0
Labor	Sonia Argirov	6,973	46.0	−28.0
Independent Labor gain from Labor		Swing	+54.0	

=== Eyre ===
1985 South Australian state election: Eyre
Party	Candidate	Votes	%	±%
Liberal	Graham Gunn	9,577	63.8	−0.2
Labor	Jennie Lee	4,781	31.8	−3.2
Democrats	Jillian Polkinghorne	656	4.4	+3.4
Total formal votes		15,014	95.6	
Informal votes		692	4.4	
Turnout		15,706	88.9	
Two-party-preferred result
Liberal	Graham Gunn	9,879	65.8	+0.8
Labor	Jennie Lee	5,135	34.2	−0.8
Liberal hold		Swing	+0.8	

=== Fisher ===
1985 South Australian state election: Fisher
Party	Candidate	Votes	%	±%
Labor	Philip Tyler	9,908	48.4	+6.7
Liberal	Grant Chapman	9,612	46.9	+0.7
Democrats	Audrey Sibly	961	4.7	−7.4
Total formal votes		20,481	98.1	
Informal votes		387	1.9	
Turnout		20,868	94.9	
Two-party-preferred result
Labor	Philip Tyler	10,469	51.1	+3.2
Liberal	Grant Chapman	10,012	48.9	−3.2
Labor gain from Liberal		Swing	+3.2	

=== Flinders ===
1985 South Australian state election: Flinders
Party	Candidate	Votes	%	±%
National	Peter Blacker	6,864	39.4	−12.6
Liberal	Arthur Whyte	6,740	38.7	+14.7
Labor	Terrence Krieg	3,446	19.8	−3.2
Democrats	George Jukes	380	2.2	+1.2
Total formal votes		17,430	98.1	
Informal votes		331	1.9	
Turnout		17,761	94.0	
Two-party-preferred result
Liberal	Arthur Whyte	12,933	74.2	−0.8
Labor	Terrence Krieg	4,497	25.8	+0.8
Two-candidate-preferred result
National	Peter Blacker	10,161	58.3	
Liberal	Arthur Whyte	7,269	41.7	
National hold		Swing	N/A	

=== Florey ===
1985 South Australian state election: Florey
Party	Candidate	Votes	%	±%
Labor	Bob Gregory	9,961	55.5	+2.5
Liberal	Martin Luther	7,047	39.3	−0.7
Democrats	Andrew Sickerdick	934	5.2	−0.8
Total formal votes		17,942	97.1	
Informal votes		537	2.9	
Turnout		18,479	95.0	
Two-party-preferred result
Labor	Bob Gregory	10,450	58.2	+2.2
Liberal	Martin Luther	7,492	41.8	−2.2
Labor hold		Swing	+2.2	

=== Gilles ===
1985 South Australian state election: Gilles
Party	Candidate	Votes	%	±%
Labor	Jack Slater	10,083	60.6	+3.6
Liberal	Lois Bell	5,492	33.0	0.0
Democrats	Brian Fain	1,072	6.4	−3.6
Total formal votes		16,647	96.4	
Informal votes		629	3.6	
Turnout		17,276	94.4	
Two-party-preferred result
Labor	Jack Slater	10,689	64.2	+2.2
Liberal	Lois Bell	5,958	35.8	−2.2
Labor hold		Swing	+2.2	

=== Goyder ===
1985 South Australian state election: Goyder
Party	Candidate	Votes	%	±%
Liberal	John Meier	11,533	59.6	+2.6
Labor	Michael Wright	6,932	35.8	+5.8
Democrats	Rosemary Dow	898	4.6	+1.6
Total formal votes		19,363	97.4	
Informal votes		518	2.6	
Turnout		19,881	95.0	
Two-party-preferred result
Liberal	John Meier	12,077	62.4	−5.6
Labor	Michael Wright	7,286	37.6	+5.6
Liberal hold		Swing	−5.6	

=== Hanson ===
1985 South Australian state election: Hanson
Party	Candidate	Votes	%	±%
Liberal	Heini Becker	8,552	48.9	−2.1
Labor	Ann Pengelly	8,289	47.4	+5.4
Democrats	Ian Haines	650	3.7	−3.3
Total formal votes		17,491	97.3	
Informal votes		488	2.7	
Turnout		17,979	93.7	
Two-party-preferred result
Liberal	Heini Becker	8,895	50.9	−3.1
Labor	Ann Pengelly	8,596	49.1	+3.1
Liberal hold		Swing	−3.1	

=== Hartley ===
1985 South Australian state election: Hartley
Party	Candidate	Votes	%	±%
Labor	Terry Groom	10,347	59.6	+7.6
Liberal	Rilka Warbanoff	6,114	35.2	−1.0
Democrats	Cathi Tucker-Lee	911	5.2	−6.5
Total formal votes		17,372	95.9	
Informal votes		740	4.1	
Turnout		18,112	93.4	
Two-party-preferred result
Labor	Terry Groom	10,853	62.5	+3.5
Liberal	Rilka Warbanoff	6,519	37.5	−3.5
Labor hold		Swing	+3.5	

=== Hayward ===
1985 South Australian state election: Hayward
Party	Candidate	Votes	%	±%
Labor	June Appleby	8,678	50.1	+3.1
Liberal	Julian Glynn	7,730	44.6	−2.4
Democrats	John Stapledon	908	5.2	−0.8
Total formal votes		17,316	97.7	
Informal votes		405	2.3	
Turnout		17,721	95.0	
Two-party-preferred result
Labor	June Appleby	9,146	52.8	+2.8
Liberal	Julian Glynn	8,170	47.2	−2.8
Labor hold		Swing	+2.8	

=== Henley Beach ===
1985 South Australian state election: Henley Beach
Party	Candidate	Votes	%	±%
Labor	Don Ferguson	9,876	54.6	+2.6
Liberal	Bob Randall	7,204	39.8	−3.2
Democrats	Gladys Wells	753	4.2	−0.8
Independent	Joe Rossi	264	1.4	+1.4
Total formal votes		18,097	96.8	
Informal votes		595	3.2	
Turnout		18,692	94.5	
Two-party-preferred result
Labor	Don Ferguson	10,373	57.3	+3.3
Liberal	Bob Randall	7,724	42.7	−3.3
Labor hold		Swing	+3.3	

=== Heysen ===
1985 South Australian state election: Heysen
Party	Candidate	Votes	%	±%
Liberal	David Wotton	9,418	54.4	−2.6
Labor	Elizabeth Harvey	6,497	37.5	+4.5
Democrats	Merilyn Pedrick	1,095	6.3	−3.7
National	Douglas Lindley	304	1.8	+1.8
Total formal votes		17,314	97.4	
Informal votes		460	2.6	
Turnout		17,774	93.1	
Two-party-preferred result
Liberal	David Wotton	10,175	58.8	−3.2
Labor	Elizabeth Harvey	7,139	41.2	+3.2
Liberal hold		Swing	−3.2	

=== Kavel ===
1985 South Australian state election: Kavel
Party	Candidate	Votes	%	±%
Liberal	Roger Goldsworthy	10,842	59.5	+2.5
Labor	Lance Jones	6,380	35.0	−3.0
Independent	Paul Reader	1,002	5.5	+5.5
Total formal votes		18,224	97.0	
Informal votes		555	3.0	
Turnout		18,779	93.5	
Two-party-preferred result
Liberal	Roger Goldsworthy	11,250	61.8	+1.8
Labor	Lance Jones	6,974	38.2	−1.8
Liberal hold		Swing	+1.8	

=== Light ===
1985 South Australian state election: Light
Party	Candidate	Votes	%	±%
Liberal	Bruce Eastick	10,012	55.6	−6.4
Labor	Tony Piccolo	6,756	37.5	+4.5
Democrats	Nicholas Wedge	828	4.6	−0.4
Independent	Eric Gerlach	410	2.3	+2.3
Total formal votes		18,006	95.4	
Informal votes		877	4.6	
Turnout		18,883	94.5	
Two-party-preferred result
Liberal	Bruce Eastick	10,675	59.3	−5.7
Labor	Tony Piccolo	7,331	40.7	+5.7
Liberal hold		Swing	−5.7	

=== Mawson ===
1985 South Australian state election: Mawson
Party	Candidate	Votes	%	±%
Labor	Susan Lenehan	11,152	62.8	+5.8
Liberal	Raija Havu	5,502	31.0	−5.1
Democrats	Tim Wells	1,095	6.2	−0.8
Total formal votes		17,749	97.1	
Informal votes		528	2.9	
Turnout		18,277	92.7	
Two-party-preferred result
Labor	Susan Lenehan	11,740	66.1	+5.1
Liberal	Raija Havu	6,009	33.9	−5.1
Labor hold		Swing	+5.1	

=== Mitcham ===
1985 South Australian state election: Mitcham
Party	Candidate	Votes	%	±%
Liberal	Stephen Baker	9,859	55.5	+6.5
Labor	Barbara Hughes	6,689	37.6	+8.6
Democrats	Guy Harley	1,230	6.9	−15.1
Total formal votes		17,778	96.9	
Informal votes		578	3.1	
Turnout		18,356	92.9	
Two-party-preferred result
Liberal	Stephen Baker	10,368	58.3	−1.7
Labor	Barbara Hughes	7,410	41.7	+1.7
Liberal hold		Swing	−1.7	

=== Mitchell ===
1985 South Australian state election: Mitchell
Party	Candidate	Votes	%	±%
Labor	Ron Payne	10,408	60.8	+3.8
Liberal	Mark Hanckel	5,876	34.4	−2.6
Democrats	Peter Mann	821	4.8	−1.2
Total formal votes		17,105	96.4	
Informal votes		636	3.6	
Turnout		17,741	94.0	
Two-party-preferred result
Labor	Ron Payne	10,864	63.5	+3.5
Liberal	Mark Hanckel	6,241	36.5	−3.5
Labor hold		Swing	+3.5	

=== Morphett ===
1985 South Australian state election: Morphett
Party	Candidate	Votes	%	±%
Liberal	John Oswald	8,987	52.7	−2.3
Labor	Trevor Peikert	7,329	43.0	+3.0
Democrats	Sue Carver	725	4.3	−0.7
Total formal votes		17,041	97.3	
Informal votes		476	2.7	
Turnout		17,517	93.8	
Two-party-preferred result
Liberal	John Oswald	9,318	54.7	−2.3
Labor	Trevor Peikert	7,723	45.3	+2.3
Liberal hold		Swing	−2.3	

=== Mount Gambier ===
1985 South Australian state election: Mount Gambier
Party	Candidate	Votes	%	±%
Liberal	Harold Allison	10,292	58.9	+8.9
Labor	Peter Humphries	6,789	38.9	−6.1
Democrats	Glenn Taylor	380	2.2	−2.8
Total formal votes		17,461	97.2	
Informal votes		510	2.8	
Turnout		17,971	95.9	
Two-party-preferred result
Liberal	Harold Allison	10,457	59.9	+6.9
Labor	Peter Humphries	7,004	40.1	−6.9
Liberal hold		Swing	+6.9	

=== Murray-Mallee ===
1985 South Australian state election: Murray-Mallee
Party	Candidate	Votes	%	±%
Liberal	Peter Lewis	10,454	58.2	−3.8
Labor	Peter Dickson	5,068	28.2	+3.2
National	Gavin Doecke	1,562	8.7	−2.3
Independent	Steve Wilkinson	515	2.9	+2.9
Democrats	Don French	367	2.0	0.0
Total formal votes		17,966	97.2	
Informal votes		525	2.8	
Turnout		18,491	94.0	
Two-party-preferred result
Liberal	Peter Lewis	12,319	68.6	+0.6
Labor	Peter Dickson	5,647	31.4	−0.6
Liberal hold		Swing	+0.6	

=== Napier ===
1985 South Australian state election: Napier
Party	Candidate	Votes	%	±%
Labor	Terry Hemmings	10,744	66.8	+1.8
Liberal	Brenda Bates	3,350	20.8	−2.2
Independent	John Campbell	1,317	8.2	+8.2
Democrats	Barbara Barlow	666	4.1	−7.9
Total formal votes		16,077	95.9	
Informal votes		693	4.1	
Turnout		16,770	92.4	
Two-party-preferred result
Labor	Terry Hemmings	11,814	73.5	+2.5
Liberal	Brenda Bates	4,263	26.5	−2.5
Labor hold		Swing	+2.5	

=== Newland ===
1985 South Australian state election: Newland
Party	Candidate	Votes	%	±%
Labor	Di Gayler	9,213	49.1	+3.1
Liberal	Scott Ashenden	8,708	46.4	−1.6
Democrats	Mike Bolt	851	4.5	−0.5
Total formal votes		18,772	97.6	
Informal votes		459	2.4	
Turnout		19,231	95.0	
Two-party-preferred result
Labor	Di Gayler	9,665	51.5	+2.5
Liberal	Scott Ashenden	9,107	48.5	−2.5
Labor hold		Swing	+2.5	

- Newland became a notional Liberal held seat in the redistribution. Scott Ashenden was the sitting member for the district of Todd.

=== Norwood ===
1985 South Australian state election: Norwood
Party	Candidate	Votes	%	±%
Labor	Greg Crafter	8,990	53.2	+0.2
Liberal	Sue Graham	7,074	41.8	+0.8
Democrats	Rodney Roberts	848	5.0	−1.0
Total formal votes		16,912	97.3	
Informal votes		479	2.7	
Turnout		17,391	92.4	
Two-party-preferred result
Labor	Greg Crafter	9,526	56.3	+0.3
Liberal	Sue Graham	7,386	43.7	−0.3
Labor hold		Swing	+0.3	

=== Peake ===
1985 South Australian state election: Peake
Party	Candidate	Votes	%	±%
Labor	Keith Plunkett	10,593	61.9	−3.1
Liberal	Steve Peake	5,401	31.6	+1.6
Democrats	Jeff Wild	794	4.6	−1.4
Independent	Ian Frances	313	1.8	+1.8
Total formal votes		17,101	93.0	
Informal votes		1,294	7.0	
Turnout		18,395	93.5	
Two-party-preferred result
Labor	Keith Plunkett	11,232	65.7	−1.3
Liberal	Steve Peake	5,869	34.3	+1.3
Labor hold		Swing	−1.3	

=== Playford ===
1985 South Australian state election: Playford
Party	Candidate	Votes	%	±%
Labor	Terry McRae	11,289	66.3	+6.3
Liberal	Dorothy Kotz	4,782	28.1	−2.9
Democrats	Eileen Farmer	955	5.6	−3.4
Total formal votes		17,026	93.9	
Informal votes		1,104	6.1	
Turnout		18,130	94.0	
Two-party-preferred result
Labor	Terry McRae	11,810	69.4	+5.4
Liberal	Dorothy Kotz	5,216	30.6	−5.4
Labor hold		Swing	+5.4	

=== Price ===
1985 South Australian state election: Price
Party	Candidate	Votes	%	±%
Labor	Murray De Laine	12,163	69.4	−4.6
Liberal	Jean Lawrie	4,144	23.7	−1.3
Democrats	Don Bond	1,216	6.9	+5.9
Total formal votes		17,523	94.8	
Informal votes		961	5.2	
Turnout		18,484	92.9	
Two-party-preferred result
Labor	Murray De Laine	13,025	74.3	−0.7
Liberal	Jean Lawrie	4,498	25.7	+0.7
Labor hold		Swing	−0.7	

=== Ramsay ===
1985 South Australian state election: Ramsay
Party	Candidate	Votes	%	±%
Labor	Lynn Arnold	12,959	74.2	+3.2
Liberal	Jim Davis	4,516	25.8	+3.8
Total formal votes		17,475	95.4	
Informal votes		839	4.6	
Turnout		18,314	93.5	
Labor hold		Swing	+0.2	

=== Ross Smith ===
1985 South Australian state election: Ross Smith
Party	Candidate	Votes	%	±%
Labor	John Bannon	11,415	65.9	−1.1
Liberal	Darryl Watson	5,106	29.5	−1.5
Democrats	Kate Hannaford	790	4.6	+2.6
Total formal votes		17,311	96.1	
Informal votes		696	3.9	
Turnout		18,007	93.9	
Two-party-preferred result
Labor	John Bannon	11,895	68.7	+0.7
Liberal	Darryl Watson	5,416	31.3	−0.7
Labor hold		Swing	+0.7	

=== Semaphore ===
1985 South Australian state election: Semaphore
Party	Candidate	Votes	%	±%
Independent Labor	Norm Peterson	7,226	41.7	−3.3
Labor	Rod Sawford	7,104	41.0	+15.0
Liberal	Mark Laing	2,831	16.3	−11.7
Democrats	F Goncalves	177	1.0	+1.0
Total formal votes		17,338	97.1	
Informal votes		526	2.9	
Turnout		17,864	94.4	
Two-candidate-preferred result
Independent Labor	Norm Peterson	9,939	57.3	
Labor	Rod Sawford	7,399	42.7	
Independent Labor hold		Swing	N/A	

=== Spence ===
1985 South Australian state election: Spence
Party	Candidate	Votes	%	±%
Labor	Roy Abbott	11,349	64.8	−6.2
Liberal	Joe Ryan	5,231	29.8	+2.9
Democrats	Elizabeth Sanderson	942	5.4	+3.4
Total formal votes		17,522	96.0	
Informal votes		727	4.0	
Turnout		18,249	93.3	
Two-party-preferred result
Labor	Roy Abbott	11,978	68.4	−3.6
Liberal	Joe Ryan	5,544	31.6	+3.6
Labor hold		Swing	−3.6	

=== Stuart ===
1985 South Australian state election: Stuart
Party	Candidate	Votes	%	±%
Labor	Gavin Keneally	11,164	67.5	−2.5
Liberal	Bob Smith	4,130	24.9	+3.0
Independent	Peter Clark	728	4.4	+4.4
Democrats	Harm Folkers	526	3.2	−4.8
Total formal votes		16,548	93.0	
Informal votes		1,237	7.0	
Turnout		17,785	94.2	
Two-party-preferred result
Labor	Gavin Keneally	11,920	72.0	−2.0
Liberal	Bob Smith	4,628	28.0	+2.0
Labor hold		Swing	−2.0	

=== Todd ===
1985 South Australian state election: Todd
Party	Candidate	Votes	%	±%
Labor	John Klunder	9,203	53.2	+3.3
Liberal	Jeff Nicholas	7,287	42.2	−2.8
Democrats	Aussie Kanck	792	4.6	−0.4
Total formal votes		17,282	96.7	
Informal votes		582	3.3	
Turnout		17,864	94.7	
Two-party-preferred result
Labor	John Klunder	9,669	55.9	+3.9
Liberal	Jeff Nicholas	7,613	44.1	−3.9
Labor gain from Liberal		Swing	+3.9	

- Todd became a notionally Labor held seat in the redistribution.

=== Unley ===
1985 South Australian state election: Unley
Party	Candidate	Votes	%	±%
Labor	Kym Mayes	8,797	51.2	+1.3
Liberal	Denis Sheridan	7,314	42.6	−2.5
Nuclear Disarmament	Barbara Boden	685	4.0	+4.0
Independent	Peter Kallas	385	2.2	+2.2
Total formal votes		17,181	96.7	
Informal votes		590	3.3	
Turnout		17,771	90.8	
Two-party-preferred result
Labor	Kym Mayes	9,444	55.0	+3.0
Liberal	Denis Sheridan	7,737	45.0	−3.0
Labor hold		Swing	+3.0	

=== Victoria ===
1985 South Australian state election: Victoria
Party	Candidate	Votes	%	±%
Liberal	Dale Baker	9,074	49.4	−10.6
Labor	Bill Hender	4,972	27.1	−1.9
National	Geoff Clothier	3,797	20.7	+12.7
Democrats	Roy Milne	518	2.8	+0.2
Total formal votes		18,361	96.5	
Informal votes		662	3.5	
Turnout		19,023	94.5	
Two-party-preferred result
Liberal	Dale Baker	12,549	68.3	+0.3
Labor	Bill Hender	5,812	31.7	−0.3
Liberal hold		Swing	+0.3	

=== Walsh ===
1985 South Australian state election: Walsh
Party	Candidate	Votes	%	±%
Labor	John Trainer	9,422	56.7	+2.7
Liberal	Lenore Triplow	5,709	34.3	−4.7
Independent	Reece Jennings	868	5.2	+5.2
Democrats	Helen Brasted	629	3.8	−3.2
Total formal votes		16,628	94.4	
Informal votes		980	5.6	
Turnout		17,608	92.7	
Two-party-preferred result
Labor	John Trainer	10,091	60.7	+2.7
Liberal	Lenore Triplow	6,537	39.3	−2.7
Labor hold		Swing	+2.7	

=== Whyalla ===
1985 South Australian state election: Whyalla
Party	Candidate	Votes	%	±%
Labor	Frank Blevins	8,877	53.9	−7.1
Liberal	Laurie Wilks	3,890	23.6	+4.6
Independent Labor	Peter Murphy	2,780	16.9	+0.9
Democrats	Graham Gloede	345	2.1	+2.1
Independent	Andy Fleming	225	1.4	+1.4
Nuclear Disarmament	Jack Berry	193	1.2	+1.2
National	Fred Wilson	166	1.0	+1.0
Total formal votes		16,476	96.3	
Informal votes		633	3.7	
Turnout		17,109	92.2	
Two-party-preferred result
Labor	Frank Blevins	11,047	67.0	−8.0
Liberal	Laurie Wilks	5,429	33.0	+8.0
Labor hold		Swing	−8.0	

== See also ==
- Candidates of the 1985 South Australian state election
- Members of the South Australian House of Assembly, 1985–1989
