= Members of the South Australian Legislative Council, 1985–1989 =

This is a list of members of the South Australian Legislative Council between 1985 and 1989. As half of the Legislative Council's terms expired at each state election, half of these members were elected at the 1982 state election with terms expiring in 1989, while the other half were elected at the 1985 state election with terms expiring in 1993.

Party	Seats held	1985–1989 Council
Australian Labor Party	10	
Liberal Party of Australia	10	
Australian Democrats	2	

Name	Party	Term expiry	Term of office
Gordon Bruce	Labor	1993	1979–1993
John Burdett	Liberal	1993	1973–1993
Martin Cameron	Liberal	1989	1971–1990
Brian Chatterton ^{[2]}	Labor	1993	1973–1987
Dr John Cornwall ^{[4]}	Labor	1989	1975–1989
Trevor Crothers ^{[2]}	Labor	1993	1987–2002
Legh Davis	Liberal	1993	1979–2002
Peter Dunn	Liberal	1989	1982–1997
Mike Elliott	Democrat	1993	1985–1993, 1994–2002
Mario Feleppa	Labor	1989	1982–1995
Ian Gilfillan	Democrat	1989	1982–1993, 1997–2006
Trevor Griffin	Liberal	1993	1978–2002
Murray Hill ^{[3]}	Liberal	1989	1965–1988
Jamie Irwin	Liberal	1993	1985–2002
Diana Laidlaw	Liberal	1989	1982–2003
Anne Levy	Labor	1989	1975–1997
Rob Lucas	Liberal	1989	1982–2022
Carolyn Pickles	Labor	1993	1985–2002
Robert Ritson	Liberal	1993	1979–1993
Ron Roberts ^{[4]}	Labor	1989	1989–2006
Terry Roberts	Labor	1993	1985–2006
Julian Stefani ^{[3]}	Liberal	1989	1988–2006
Chris Sumner	Labor	1989	1975–1994
George Weatherill ^{[1]}	Labor	1989	1986–2000
Barbara Wiese	Labor	1993	1979–1995

^{1} Labor MLC Frank Blevins had resigned late in the previous term in order to contest the Legislative Assembly seat of Giles at the 1985 state election. Blevins was not due to face re-election that year, so the new parliament needed to fill a casual vacancy to cover the remaining four years of his term. George Weatherill was appointed on 11 February 1986.
^{2} Labor MLC Brian Chatterton resigned on 2 February 1987. Trevor Crothers was appointed to the resulting casual vacancy on 24 February 1987.
^{3} Liberal MLC Murray Hill resigned on 4 July 1988. Julian Stefani was appointed to the resulting casual vacancy on 4 August 1988.
^{4} Labor MLC Dr John Cornwall resigned on 31 January 1989. Ron Roberts was appointed to the resulting casual vacancy on 14 February 1989.
