= Electoral results for the district of Playford =

South Australian district election results

This is a list of electoral results for the Electoral district of Playford in South Australian state elections.

== Members for Playford ==
Member	Party	Term
Terry McRae	Labor	1970–1989
John Quirke	Labor	1989–1997
Jack Snelling	Labor	1997–2018
Michael Brown	Labor	2018–2022
John Fulbrook	Labor	2022–present

== Election results ==
=== Elections in the 2020s ===
==== 2026 ====
2026 South Australian state election: Playford
Party	Candidate	Votes	%	±%
Labor	John Fulbrook	11,209	50.8	−2.7
One Nation	Nickolas Tsentidis	5,343	24.2	+24.2
Greens	David Wright	1,988	9.0	−0.5
Liberal	Christopher Jones	1,760	8.0	−16.7
Family First	Antonio Rangel	765	3.5	−4.5
Legalise Cannabis	Trent Oehme	526	2.4	+2.4
Australian Family	Richard Bunting	247	1.1	+1.1
United Voice	Grace Bawden	206	0.9	+0.9
Total formal votes		22,044	94.7	−1.0
Informal votes		1,238	5.3	+1.0
Turnout		23,282	86.6	−0.8
Two-candidate-preferred result
Labor	John Fulbrook	14,809	67.2	+0.9
One Nation	Nickolas Tsentidis	7,239	32.8	+32.8
Labor hold				

==== 2022 ====
2022 South Australian state election: Playford
Party	Candidate	Votes	%	±%
Labor	John Fulbrook	11,922	53.5	+3.1
Liberal	Hemant Dave	5,511	24.7	+6.8
Greens	David Wright	2,118	9.5	+4.6
Family First	Rojan Jose	1,773	8.0	+8.0
Independent	Shane Quinn	973	4.4	+4.4
Total formal votes		22,297	95.7	
Informal votes		1,011	4.3	
Turnout		23,308	87.4	
Two-party-preferred result
Labor	John Fulbrook	14,777	66.3	−2.7
Liberal	Hemant Dave	7,520	33.7	+2.7
Labor hold		Swing	−2.7	

=== Elections in the 2010s ===
==== 2018 ====
2018 South Australian state election: Playford
Party	Candidate	Votes	%	±%
Labor	Michael Brown	10,551	47.2	−4.9
Liberal	Hemant Dave	4,679	20.9	−10.4
SA-Best	Helen Szuty	4,455	19.9	+19.9
Greens	Brock Le Cerf	1,346	6.0	−1.1
Conservatives	Shane Sheoran	1,325	5.9	−3.5
Total formal votes		22,356	95.0	−1.0
Informal votes		1,175	5.0	+1.0
Turnout		23,531	89.2	+2.8
Two-party-preferred result
Labor	Michael Brown	14,827	66.3	+4.6
Liberal	Hemant Dave	7,529	33.7	−4.6
Labor hold		Swing	+4.6	

2014 South Australian state election: Playford
Party	Candidate	Votes	%	±%
Labor	Jack Snelling	11,352	52.5	−1.5
Liberal	Michael Santagata	6,779	31.4	+2.4
Family First	Greg Evitts	2,052	9.5	+2.9
Greens	Danny Carroll	1,426	6.6	+1.2
Total formal votes		21,609	95.8	−0.0
Informal votes		942	4.2	+0.0
Turnout		22,551	91.7	−1.1
Two-party-preferred result
Labor	Jack Snelling	13,533	62.6	−2.0
Liberal	Michael Santagata	8,076	37.4	+2.0
Labor hold		Swing	−2.0	

2010 South Australian state election: Playford
Party	Candidate	Votes	%	±%
Labor	Jack Snelling	11,292	54.5	−9.5
Liberal	Kerry Faggotter	5,892	28.4	+9.3
Family First	Steve Ambler	1,349	6.5	−1.7
Greens	Dion Ashenden	1,116	5.4	+0.4
FREE Australia	Frank Feldmann	647	3.1	+3.1
Democrats	Andrew Woon	435	2.1	−1.6
Total formal votes		20,731	95.6	
Informal votes		903	4.4	
Turnout		21,634	92.9	
Two-party-preferred result
Labor	Jack Snelling	13,734	66.2	−9.5
Liberal	Kerry Faggotter	6,997	33.8	+9.5
Labor hold		Swing	−9.5	

=== Elections in the 2000s ===
2006 South Australian state election: Playford
Party	Candidate	Votes	%	±%
Labor	Jack Snelling	13,205	64.0	+12.3
Liberal	Tom Javor	3,955	19.2	−9.8
Family First	John Doening	1,686	8.2	+2.7
Greens	Paul Sharpe	1,039	5.0	+5.0
Democrats	Ben Howieson	759	3.7	−4.8
Total formal votes		20,644	95.8	
Informal votes		858	4.2	
Turnout		21,502	92.9	
Two-party-preferred result
Labor	Jack Snelling	15,642	75.8	+12.7
Liberal	Tom Javor	5,002	24.2	−12.7
Labor hold		Swing	+12.7	

2002 South Australian state election: Playford
Party	Candidate	Votes	%	±%
Labor	Jack Snelling	10,464	51.7	+2.4
Liberal	Tom Javor	5,859	28.9	+1.1
Democrats	Andrew Sickerdick	1,714	8.5	−9.6
Family First	Eileen Strikwerda	1,116	5.5	+5.5
One Nation	Bert Joy	632	3.1	+3.1
SA First	Jan Vrtielka	469	2.3	+2.3
Total formal votes		20,254	96.3	
Informal votes		774	3.7	
Turnout		21,028	94.1	
Two-party-preferred result
Labor	Jack Snelling	12,778	63.1	−0.4
Liberal	Tom Javor	7,476	36.9	+0.4
Labor hold		Swing	−0.4	

=== Elections in the 1990s ===
1997 South Australian state election: Playford
Party	Candidate	Votes	%	±%
Labor	Jack Snelling	9,464	48.8	+5.6
Liberal	Peter Panagaris	5,498	28.4	−13.6
Democrats	Mal Cummings	3,545	18.3	+10.3
United Australia	Bexley Carman	876	4.5	+4.5
Total formal votes		19,383	95.2	−1.3
Informal votes		975	4.8	+1.3
Turnout		20,358	93.0	
Two-party-preferred result
Labor	Jack Snelling	12,200	62.9	+10.8
Liberal	Peter Panagaris	7,183	37.1	−10.8
Labor hold		Swing	+10.8	

1993 South Australian state election: Playford
Party	Candidate	Votes	%	±%
Labor	John Quirke	8,329	43.7	−8.6
Liberal	Peter Panagaris	7,865	41.3	+9.0
Democrats	Colin Maas	1,521	7.0	−7.1
Independent	Lionel Owen	685	3.6	+3.6
Independent	John Cotton	648	3.4	+3.4
Total formal votes		19,048	96.5	+0.3
Informal votes		683	3.5	−0.3
Turnout		19,731	94.9	
Two-party-preferred result
Labor	John Quirke	10,036	52.7	−7.1
Liberal	Peter Panagaris	9,012	47.3	+7.1
Labor hold		Swing	−7.1	

=== Elections in the 1980s ===
1989 South Australian state election: Playford
Party	Candidate	Votes	%	±%
Labor	John Quirke	9,244	51.6	−14.7
Liberal	Peter Panagaris	5,859	32.7	+4.6
Democrats	Andrew Sickerdick	2,823	15.7	+10.1
Total formal votes		17,926	96.3	+2.4
Informal votes		683	3.7	−2.4
Turnout		18,609	94.8	+0.8
Two-party-preferred result
Labor	John Quirke	10,597	59.1	−10.3
Liberal	Peter Panagaris	7,329	40.9	+10.3
Labor hold		Swing	−10.3	

1985 South Australian state election: Playford
Party	Candidate	Votes	%	±%
Labor	Terry McRae	11,289	66.3	+6.3
Liberal	Dorothy Kotz	4,782	28.1	−2.9
Democrats	Eileen Farmer	955	5.6	−3.4
Total formal votes		17,026	93.9	
Informal votes		1,104	6.1	
Turnout		18,130	94.0	
Two-party-preferred result
Labor	Terry McRae	11,810	69.4	+5.4
Liberal	Dorothy Kotz	5,216	30.6	−5.4
Labor hold		Swing	+5.4	

1982 South Australian state election: Playford
Party	Candidate	Votes	%	±%
Labor	Terry McRae	10,391	59.5	+12.6
Liberal	Bill Arnold	5,510	31.5	−4.8
Democrats	Colin Nieass	1,568	9.0	−7.8
Total formal votes		17,469	92.3	−1.4
Informal votes		1,452	7.7	+1.4
Turnout		18,921	93.2	−0.2
Two-party-preferred result
Labor	Terry McRae	11,304	64.7	+9.6
Liberal	Bill Arnold	6,165	35.3	−9.6
Labor hold		Swing	+9.6	

=== Elections in the 1970s ===
1979 South Australian state election: Playford
Party	Candidate	Votes	%	±%
Labor	Terry McRae	7,524	46.9	−13.7
Liberal	Neville Mitchell	5,835	36.3	+11.8
Democrats	John Longhurst	2,691	16.8	+3.1
Total formal votes		16,050	93.7	−3.4
Informal votes		1,077	6.3	+3.4
Turnout		17,127	93.4	−0.5
Two-party-preferred result
Labor	Terry McRae	8,639	55.1	−10.0
Liberal	Neville Mitchell	7,211	44.9	+10.0
Labor hold		Swing	−10.0	

1977 South Australian state election: Playford
Party	Candidate	Votes	%	±%
Labor	Terry McRae	10,011	60.6	+1.9
Liberal	John McGowan	4,052	24.5	+8.5
Democrats	John Longhurst	2,271	13.7	+13.7
Communist	Donald Sutherland	195	1.2	+1.2
Total formal votes		16,529	97.1	
Informal votes		492	2.9	
Turnout		17,021	93.9	
Two-party-preferred result
Labor	Terry McRae	11,080	65.1	+1.8
Liberal	John McGowan	5,449	34.9	−1.8
Labor hold		Swing	+1.8	

1975 South Australian state election: Playford
Party	Candidate	Votes	%	±%
Labor	Terry McRae	13,473	59.8	−5.0
Liberal Movement	Dennis Paul	4,888	21.7	+21.7
Liberal	Peter Shurven	3,434	15.3	−19.9
National	Reginald Hewitt	722	3.2	+3.2
Total formal votes		22,517	94.8	+0.6
Informal votes		1,245	5.2	−0.6
Turnout		23,762	93.5	−0.1
Two-candidate-preferred result
Labor	Terry McRae	14,028	62.3	−2.5
Liberal Movement	Dennis Paul	8,489	37.7	+37.7
Labor hold		Swing	N/A	

1973 South Australian state election: Playford
Party	Candidate	Votes	%	±%
Labor	Terry McRae	11,545	64.8	+7.7
Liberal and Country	Lloyd Duffield	6,276	35.2	−0.4
Total formal votes		17,821	94.2	−3.9
Informal votes		1,104	5.8	+3.9
Turnout		18,925	93.6	−1.6
Labor hold		Swing	+4.0	

1970 South Australian state election: Playford
Party	Candidate	Votes	%	±%
Labor	Terry McRae	8,358	57.1	
Liberal and Country	Lloyd Duffield	5,207	35.6	
Social Credit	Frank Lawrence	1,078	7.4	
Total formal votes		14,643	98.1	
Informal votes		282	1.9	
Turnout		14,925	95.2	
Two-party-preferred result
Labor	Terry McRae	8,897	60.8	
Liberal and Country	Lloyd Duffield	5,746	39.2	
Labor hold		Swing		
