= Electoral results for the district of Mallee =

South Australian district election results

This is a list of election results for the Electoral district of Mallee in South Australian elections.

== Members for Mallee ==
Member	Party	Term
Bill Nankivell	Liberal and Country	1970–1974
Bill Nankivell	Liberal	1974–1979
Peter Lewis	Liberal	1979–1985

== Election results ==
=== Elections in the 1980s ===
1982 South Australian state election: Mallee
Party	Candidate	Votes	%	±%
Liberal	Peter Lewis	8,374	57.5	+11.6
National	Guy Wheal	3,260	22.4	−2.6
Labor	Norman Napper	2,661	18.3	+0.4
Democrats	Samuel Pope	256	1.8	+1.8
Total formal votes		14,551	96.9	−0.3
Informal votes		468	3.1	+0.3
Turnout		15,019	94.7	+1.1
Two-party-preferred result
Liberal	Peter Lewis	11,641	80.0	+2.6
Labor	Norman Napper	2,910	20.0	−2.6
Liberal hold		Swing	+2.6	

- The two candidate preferred vote was not counted between the Liberal and National candidates for Mallee.

=== Elections in the 1970s ===
1979 South Australian state election: Mallee
Party	Candidate	Votes	%	±%
Liberal	Peter Lewis	6,488	45.9	−14.6
National	Guy Wheal	3,541	25.0	+8.8
Labor	Dale Thiel	2,526	17.9	+1.7
Independent	Ronald Hentschke	1,583	11.2	+11.2
Total formal votes		14,138	97.2	−0.9
Informal votes		414	2.8	+0.9
Turnout		14,552	93.6	−0.8
Two-candidate-preferred result
Liberal	Peter Lewis	8,134	57.3	−16.5
National	Guy Wheal	6,004	42.7	+42.7
Liberal hold		Swing	N/A	

1977 South Australian state election: Mallee
Party	Candidate	Votes	%	±%
Liberal	Bill Nankivell	8,684	60.5	+6.4
Labor	Gerald Lea	3,353	23.3	+4.4
National	Leslie Ficken	2,329	16.2	+2.4
Total formal votes		14,366	98.1	
Informal votes		283	1.9	
Turnout		14,649	94.4	
Two-party-preferred result
Liberal	Bill Nankivell	10,611	73.8	−2.6
Labor	Gerald Lea	3,755	26.2	+2.6
Liberal hold		Swing	−2.6	

1975 South Australian state election: Mallee
Party	Candidate	Votes	%	±%
Liberal	Bill Nankivell	5,040	50.2	−3.0
National	John Petch	2,443	24.3	−22.5
Labor	Ronald Maczkowiack	1,509	15.0	+15.0
Liberal Movement	William McConnell	1,046	10.4	+10.4
Total formal votes		10,038	98.1	+3.5
Informal votes		193	1.9	−3.5
Turnout		10,231	95.0	−0.7
Two-party-preferred result
Liberal	Bill Nankivell	8,181	81.5	+28.3
Labor	Ronald Maczkowiack	1,857	18.5	+18.5
Liberal hold		Swing	N/A	

- The two candidate preferred vote was not counted between the Liberal and Country candidates for Mallee.

1973 South Australian state election: Mallee
Party	Candidate	Votes	%	±%
Liberal and Country	Bill Nankivell	4,901	53.2	−4.9
Country	Joseph Philbey	4,318	46.8	+28.9
Total formal votes		9,219	94.6	−4.1
Informal votes		525	5.4	+4.1
Turnout		9,744	95.7	+1.9
Liberal and Country hold		Swing	N/A	

1970 South Australian state election: Mallee
Party	Candidate	Votes	%	±%
Liberal and Country	Bill Nankivell	5,382	58.1	
Labor	Roland Telfer	2,225	24.0	
National	John Petch	1,654	17.9	
Total formal votes		9,261	98.7	
Informal votes		123	1.3	
Turnout		9,384	93.8	
Two-party-preferred result
Liberal and Country	Bill Nankivell	6,871	74.2	
Labor	Roland Telfer	2,390	25.8	
Liberal and Country hold		Swing		
