= Members of the South Australian House of Assembly, 1985–1989 =

This is a list of members of the South Australian House of Assembly from 1986 to 1989, as elected at the 1985 state election.

Name	Party	Electorate	Term of office
Roy Abbott	Labor	Spence	1975–1989
Hon Jennifer Adamson	Liberal	Coles	1977–1993
Hon Harold Allison	Liberal	Mount Gambier	1975–1997
June Appleby	Labor	Hayward	1982–1989
Hon Peter Arnold	Liberal	Chaffey	1968–1970, 1973–1993
Lynn Arnold	Labor	Ramsay	1979–1994
Dale Baker	Liberal	Victoria	1985–1997
Stephen Baker	Liberal	Mitcham	1982–1997
John Bannon	Labor	Ross Smith	1977–1993
Heini Becker	Liberal	Hanson	1970–1997
Peter Blacker	National	Flinders	1973–1993
Frank Blevins	Labor	Whyalla	1985–1997
Hon Ted Chapman	Liberal	Alexandra	1973–1992
Greg Crafter	Labor	Norwood	1979, 1980–1993
Murray De Laine	Labor	Price	1985–2002
Mike Duigan	Labor	Adelaide	1985–1989
Hon Bruce Eastick	Liberal	Light	1970–1993
Martyn Evans	Independent	Elizabeth	1984–1994
Stan Evans	Independent/Liberal ^{[1]}	Davenport	1968–1993
Don Ferguson	Labor	Henley Beach	1982–1993
Di Gayler	Labor	Newland	1985–1989
Roger Goldsworthy	Liberal	Kavel	1970–1992
Bob Gregory	Labor	Florey	1982–1993
Terry Groom	Labor	Hartley	1977–1979, 1982–1993
Graham Gunn	Liberal	Eyre	1970–2010
Terry Hemmings	Labor	Napier	1977–1993
Graham Ingerson	Liberal	Bragg	1983–2002
Kevin Hamilton	Labor	Albert Park	1979–1993
Hon Dr Don Hopgood	Labor	Baudin	1970–1993
Gavin Keneally	Labor	Stuart	1970–1989
John Klunder	Labor	Todd	1977–1979, 1982–1993
Susan Lenehan	Labor	Mawson	1982–1993
Peter Lewis	Liberal	Murray-Mallee	1979–2006
Kym Mayes	Labor	Unley	1982–1993
Terry McRae	Labor	Playford	1970–1989
John Meier	Liberal	Goyder	1982–2006
John Olsen	Liberal	Custance	1979–1990, 1992–2002
John Oswald	Liberal	Morphett	1979–2002
Norm Peterson	Independent	Semaphore	1979–1993
Hon Ron Payne	Labor	Mitchell	1970–1989
Keith Plunkett	Labor	Peake	1979–1989
Mike Rann	Labor	Briggs	1985–2012
Derek Robertson	Labor	Bright	1985–1989
Jack Slater	Labor	Gilles	1970–1989
John Trainer	Labor	Walsh	1979–1993
Philip Tyler	Labor	Fisher	1985–1989
Hon David Wotton	Liberal	Heysen	1975–2002

^{1} Stan Evans, the MLA for Davenport and former Liberal MLA for Fisher, had been re-elected as an independent in 1985 after losing a preselection battle against incumbent Liberal and factional opponent Dean Brown. Evans subsequently rejoined the Liberal Party in 1986.
