= Electoral results for the district of Murray-Mallee =

South Australian district election results

This is a list of election results for the electoral district of Murray-Mallee in South Australian elections.

== Members for Murray-Mallee ==
Member	Party	Term
Peter Lewis	Liberal	1985–1993

== Election results ==
=== Elections in the 1980s ===
1989 South Australian state election: Murray-Mallee
Party	Candidate	Votes	%	±%
Liberal	Peter Lewis	11,774	63.7	+5.5
Labor	Jane Milek	4,240	23.0	−5.2
Democrats	Jeannette Jolley	1,717	9.3	+7.3
National	Douglas Lindley	739	4.0	−4.7
Total formal votes		18,470	97.3	+0.1
Informal votes		517	2.7	−0.1
Turnout		18,987	95.0	+1.0
Two-party-preferred result
Liberal	Peter Lewis	13,417	72.6	+4.0
Labor	Jane Milek	5,053	27.4	−4.0
Liberal hold		Swing	+4.0	

1985 South Australian state election: Murray-Mallee
Party	Candidate	Votes	%	±%
Liberal	Peter Lewis	10,454	58.2	−3.8
Labor	Peter Dickson	5,068	28.2	+3.2
National	Gavin Doecke	1,562	8.7	−2.3
Independent	Steve Wilkinson	515	2.9	+2.9
Democrats	Don French	367	2.0	0.0
Total formal votes		17,966	97.2	
Informal votes		525	2.8	
Turnout		18,491	94.0	
Two-party-preferred result
Liberal	Peter Lewis	12,319	68.6	+0.6
Labor	Peter Dickson	5,647	31.4	−0.6
Liberal hold		Swing	+0.6	
