= Mathwin =

Mathwin is a surname. Notable people with the surname include:

- Henry Mathwin (1852–1911), English schoolmaster and cricketer
- John Mathwin (1919–2004), Australian politician
