= Bob Sneath =

Australian politician

The Honourable Bob Sneath
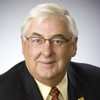

17th President of the South Australian Legislative Council
- In office 27 April 2006 – 5 October 2012
- Preceded by: Ron Roberts
- Succeeded by: John Gazzola

Member of the South Australian Legislative Council
- In office 4 October 2000 – 5 October 2012
- Preceded by: George Weatherill
- Succeeded by: Kyam Maher

Secretary, Australian Workers' Union (SA)
- In office 1995–2000

President, South Australian Labor Party
- In office 1999–2000

Personal details
- Born: June 24, 1949 (age 77) Kingston South East, South Australia
- Party: Labor Party
- Spouse: Pam Sneath
- Children: Jodie, Dwaine, Joshua, Sam
- Education: Tantanoola Primary, Millicent High
- Occupation: Shearer, Union official, politician

Robert Kenneth "Bob" Sneath (born 24 June 1949) is a former Australian politician, and was a Labor Party member of the South Australian Legislative Council from 2000 and President of the South Australian Legislative Council from 2006 until he retired from Parliament in 2012.

== Early life ==
Sneath was born in June 1949 in Kingston South East, a town in South Australia's south-east. His father was a farmer, rabbit trapper and sheep shearer, working on Lake Park Station and running shearing teams until his retirement at the age of 72. His mother was a well-known member of various community groups in the town of Naracoorte. Sneath was educated at Tantanoola Primary School and then Millicent High School.

== Early career and Union movement ==
Following the completion of his high school education, Sneath followed in his father's footsteps and began working as a shearer. Sneath was noted to be a 'Proud Shearer', with South Australian Liberal Dennis Hood recalling that after congratulating Sneath on becoming the President of the Legislative Council, he replied "Yeah, not bad for a shearer is it mate?'.

While as shearer, Sneath joined the trade union representing shearers in South Australia, the AWU, where he eventually became a union organiser in the state's south-east.

In 1994, Sneath moved to Adelaide after being elected to serve as the Secretary of the South Australian Branch of the Australian Workers' Union (AWU) from 1995 until his election to Parliament in 2000.

He is also a past Secretary of the Show Shearing Federation of Australia (SSFA).

== Parliament and politics ==
In addition to his involvement in the union movement, Sneath became involved in politics, joining the South Australian Labor Party and serving as President of the local Naracoorte sub-branch for six years. In 1999, Sneath was elected as a member of the State Executive and then President of the South Australian Branch of the Labor Party, a position he held until his election to Parliament in 2000.

In October 2000, Sneath was chosen by the Labor Party to fill a Casual Vacancy in the South Australian Legislative Council, which was created by the resignation of George Weatherill, with Sneath being sworn in on 4 October 2000. Sneath made his maiden speech in the Parliament on 10 October 2000.

On 27 April 2006, following the retirement of then-President Ron Roberts from the Legislative Council, Sneath was unanimously elected as President of the South Australian Legislative Council until he resigned from the Parliament in September 2012. receiving praise from the Liberal Opposition for being a "fair and reasonable" presiding member. Sneath's resignation caused his seat to be filled by a casual vacancy election by the Council in October 2012, which was filled by Kyam Maher. Sneath was granted the right to use the title The Honourable in December 2012.

== Personal life ==
In the 1960's, Sneath married his wife, Pam and had four children, Jodie, Dwaine, Joshua and Sam. Sneath also has a number of grandchildren

Sneath has a keen interest in fishing and is involved in fundraising for the Neil Sachse Foundation, and was a patron for the Down Syndrome Society of SA.

Parliament of South Australia
Preceded by Ron Roberts	President of the South Australian Legislative Council; 2006–2012	Succeeded by John Gazzola
