= Ron Roberts (politician) =

Australian politician

The Honourable Ron Roberts
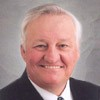

16th President of the South Australian Legislative Council
- In office 5 March 2002 – 20 February 2006
- Preceded by: Peter Dunn
- Succeeded by: Bob Sneath

Member of the Legislative Council
- In office 14 February 1989 – 20 February 2006
- Preceded by: John Cornwall

Personal details
- Born: 1944 (age 82) Port Pirie, South Australia
- Party: Labor Party
- Spouse: Janice Eileen Roberts (m. 1967)
- Children: Esther
- Occupation: Smelter worker, union official, politician

Ronald Roy Roberts (born 1944) is an Australian former politician. He was a member of the South Australian Legislative Council representing the Labor Party from 1989 to 2006. He served as President of the Council from 2002 to 2006.

== Early life ==
Roberts was born in Port Pirie, in South Australia's mid-north in 1944 to a working-class family. He was educated at the local school and began working at the Port Pirie Smelter.

Roberts' interest in politics and the trade union movement began during his third year apprenticeship at the Port Pirie Smelter, when he began attending union meetings "to see what really went on there". This later led to Roberts' involvement as a union official for the Electrical Trades Union for local Port Pirie smelter workers.

== Parliamentary career ==
In February 1989, Roberts was chosen by the Labor Party to fill a Casual Vacancy in the South Australian Legislative Council, which was created by the resignation of Peter Dunn, with Roberts being sworn in on 14 February 1989. Roberts made his maiden speech in the Parliament on 8 August 1989.

Roberts retired from Parliament at the 2006 South Australian state election, with his final day of presiding over the Legislative Council being on 1 December 2005.

Parliament of South Australia
Preceded by Jamie Irwin	President of the South Australian Legislative Council; 2002–2006	Succeeded by Bob Sneath
