= Australian Government Workers Association =

Former Australian trade union

The Australian Government Workers Association was an Australian trade union representing workers employed by state and federal governments, despite its name based only in South Australia.

It was founded on 26 May 1906 by Ernest Roberts as the South Australian Railways General Workers' Association, but in August that year broadened its reach and renamed itself the South Australian Government General Workers' Association. Around 1913, it expanded its reach to include both state and federal government employees. In September 1914, it was renamed the Australian Government Workers Association. A number of South Australian Labor figures served in union leadership, including Edward Alfred Anstey, John McInnes, Ralph Jacobi, Frank Nieass, John Price and George Weatherill, while Dorothy Coombe was a notable early woman union official.

The forerunners of the United Firefighters Union of South Australia broke away from the union in the early 1970s after being dissatisfied with their representation. In 1974, the union faced scandal when its secretary was charged and acquitted of eight counts of fraud. The charges led to a bitter internal dispute which included a legal battle and a physical brawl at a union meeting and threatened to spill over into internal state Labor politics. In 1979, the South Australian branch was reported to have a membership of 12,000.

It merged into the Federated Miscellaneous Workers' Union of Australia c. 1980.
