= President of the South Australian Legislative Council =

President of the Legislative Council Parliament of South Australia
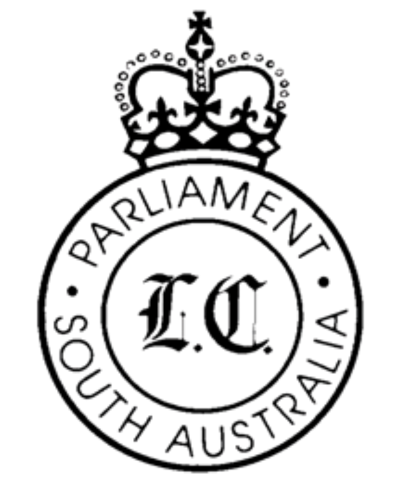
- Crest of the South Australian Legislative Council

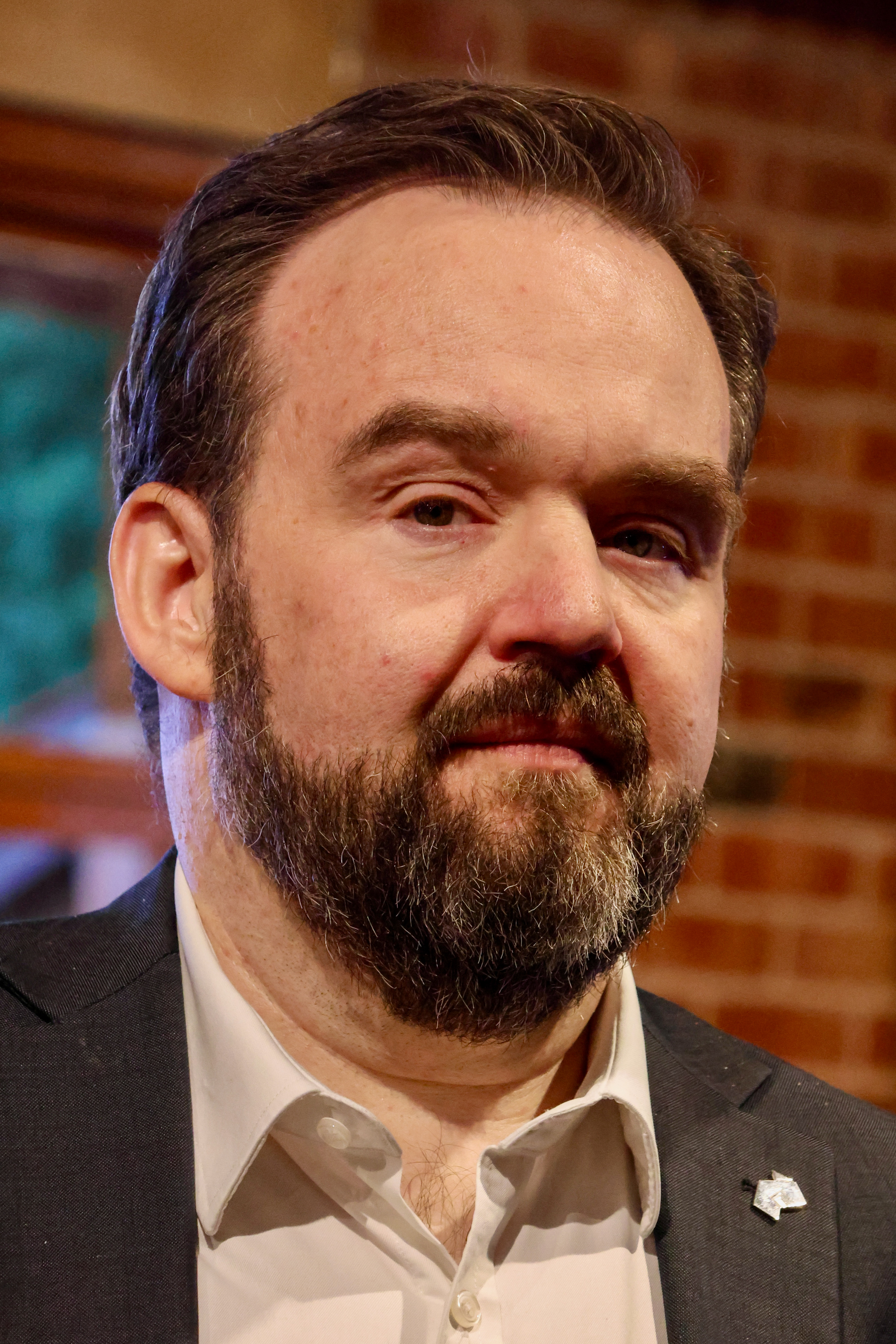
- Incumbent; Reggie Martin since 5 May 2026
- Style: Madam/Mr President (informal and within the house); The Honourable (within the Commonwealth)
- Member of: Legislative Council; Joint Parliamentary Services Committee
- Appointer: Elected by the South Australian Legislative Council
- Term length: At His Majesty's pleasure with the confidence of the House or until resignation
- Constituting instrument: Constitution Act 1934 (Sections 23-25)
- Precursor: Governor (1836-1851); Speaker (1851-1857)
- Inaugural holder: James Hurtle Fisher
- Formation: 22 April 1857
- Salary: $326,550 (including $186,600 MP salary + 75%)
- Website: Official website

The president of the South Australian Legislative Council is the presiding officer of the South Australian Legislative Council, the upper house of the Parliament of South Australia. The other presiding officer is the speaker of the South Australian House of Assembly.

The current president of the Legislative Council is Labor Party member, Reggie Martin, who has served since 2026.

== Function and election ==
The president of the Legislative Council is elected by all members of the Council to chair over the proceedings of the council, must be seen as impartial and authoritative in maintaining order and enforcement of the standing orders (or rules and procedures of the council) of the council.

The President, along with the Speaker of the House of Assembly are both members of the Joint Parliamentary Service Committee, which regulates the functions and operations of the Parliament, and its staff.

=== Election of President ===
The election of the Office of President is governed by Chapter III of the standing orders. If an election of the president is required, members of the council are asked to submit nominations, which must be seconded by another member. If at the time of the election, there are no other nominations for the position, the nominee is deemed elected unopposed; however, if more than two members have been nominated, then a secret ballot is held, with the nominee with the majority of the votes of the members present becoming president; but if no candidate has a majority, then a process whereby the name of the member who has the smallest number of votes is removed and another ballot held. This continues until the number of nominees is reduced to two, and then the nominee of those final two with the majority of votes is elected president.

==== 2020 deadlocked ballot ====
In 2020, the election of president saw an unusual deadlock contest between Liberal Party nominee Jing Lee and John Dawkins, a former Liberal member nominated by the Labor Party and the cross-bench. After two consecutive ballots, which resulted in an 11–11 deadlock, the tie-break procedure under Section 20 of the standing orders was triggered. Per the rules, both names were placed in a box; the clerk of the Legislative Council drew John Dawkins' name first, officially electing him president.

=== Absence of president ===
Unlike the House of Assembly's deputy speaker, the Legislative Council has no formal deputy to the president. If the president needs to leave the chair during a sitting period, the president may select another member of the council to act in their place; and in the absence of the president in any other occasion, the standing orders direct that the council shall select another member to fill the office until the next meeting of the council.

== History ==
Between 1836 and 1851, the Legislative Council was established with members wholly nominated by the Crown, the governor of South Australia appointed as the presiding officer, firstly by letters patent and then by the subsequent passage of the South Australia Act 1842. After a series of reforms in 1850 and 1851, the governance of South Australia created a partially representative Legislative Council, with the role of presiding officer of the council fulfilled by a speaker elected by the members of the council.

Since the passage of the Constitution Act 1856, establishing true democratic self-governance, and subsequent reforms to the Constitution of South Australia, the Legislative Council has been presided over by the president.

== Presidents of the Legislative Council ==
=== Governor as presiding officer (1836-1851) ===
From the establishment of the Council in 1836 until the reforms in 1851, the covernor of South Australia presided over the Legislative Council.

Order	Presiding Officer	Portrait	Office	Term commenced	Term ended	Term in office
1	John Hindmarsh		Governor	28 December 1836	16 July 1838	1 year, 200 days
2	George Gawler		Governor	17 October 1838	15 May 1941	2 years, 210 days
3	George Grey		Governor	15 May 1841	25 October 1845	4 years, 163 days
4	Frederick Holt Robe		Governor	25 October 1845	2 August 1848	2 years, 282 days
5	Henry Fox Young		Governor	2 August 1848	21 February 1851	2 years, 282 days

=== Speaker as presiding officer (1851-1857) ===
Between 1851 and 1857, the speaker was the presiding officer of the Legislative Council.

Order	Presiding Officer	Portrait	Term commenced	Term ended	Term in office
1	John Morphett		20 August 1851	15 August 1855	3 years, 360 days
2	James Hurtle Fisher		1 November 1855	2 February 1857	1 year, 93 days

=== Presidents as presiding officers (Since 1857) ===
In 1857, following constitutional reforms, the presiding officer of the Legislative Council was called the president.

Order	President	Portrait	Party	Term commenced	Term ended	Term in office
1	James Hurtle Fisher			22 April 1857	2 February 1865	7 years, 286 days
2	John Morphett			31 March 1865	2 April 1873	8 years, 2 days
3	William Milne			25 July 1873	19 April 1881	8 years, 0 days
4	Henry Ayers			2 June 1881	19 December 1893	12 years, 200 days
5	Richard Baker			19 December 1893	9 May 1901	7 years, 141 days
6	Lancelot Stirling			18 July 1901	24 May 1932	30 years, 311 days
7	David Gordon		Liberal and Country League	7 July 1932	29 February 1944	11 years, 206 days
8	Walter Gordon Duncan		Liberal and Country League	20 July 1944	3 March 1962	17 years, 226 days
9	Les Densley		Liberal and Country League	12 April 1962	7 March 1967	4 years, 329 days
10	Lyell McEwin		Liberal and Country League / Liberal Party	8 March 1967	11 July 1975	8 years, 125 days
11	Frank Potter		Liberal Party	5 August 1975	26 February 1978	2 years, 205 days
12	Arthur Whyte		Liberal Party of Australia	28 February 1978	7 December 1985	7 years, 282 days
13	Anne Levy		Labor Party	11 February 1986	13 April 1989	3 years, 61 days
14	Gordon Bruce		Labor Party	13 April 1989	11 December 1993	4 years, 242 days
15	Peter Dunn		Liberal Party	10 February 1994	10 October 1997	3 years, 242 days
15	Jamie Irwin		Liberal Party	2 December 1997	8 February 2002	4 years, 69 days
16	Ron Roberts		Labor Party	5 March 2002	17 March 2006	4 years, 12 days
17	Bob Sneath		Labor Party	27 April 2006	5 October 2012	6 years, 161 days
18	John Gazzola		Labor Party	16 October 2012	5 May 2014	1 year, 201 days
19	Russell Wortley		Labor Party	6 May 2014	2 May 2018	3 years, 361 days
20	Andrew McLachlan		Liberal Party	3 May 2018	6 February 2020	1 year, 279 days
21	Terry Stephens		Liberal Party	5 February 2020	8 September 2020	216 days (1st Term)
22	John Dawkins		Independent	8 September 2020	19 March 2022	1 year, 192 days
23	Terry Stephens		Liberal Party	3 May 2022	20 March 2026	3 years, 321 days (2nd Term)
24	Reggie Martin		Labor Party	5 May 2026	Present	158 days
