= John Gazzola =

Australian politician

The Honourable John Gazzola

18th President of the South Australian Legislative Council
- In office 17 October 2012 – 5 May 2014
- Preceded by: Bob Sneath
- Succeeded by: Russell Wortley

Member of the South Australian Legislative Council
- In office 9 February 2002 – 17 March 2018

Personal details
- Born: 1957 (age 68–69)
- Party: Australian Labor Party (SA)
- Occupation: Trade union official

John Mario Gazzola (Italian: [ɡadˈdzɔːla]; born 1957) is a former Australian politician who was a member of the South Australian Legislative Council for the Labor Party from 2002 to 2018. He was President of the Council from 2012 to 2014.

From 2003 to 2012, Gazzola was a member of the South Australian Parliament's Aboriginal Lands Parliamentary Standing Committee.

Previous to entering politics, Gazzola was secretary of the Australian Services Union (SA).

Gazzola announced in February 2017 that he would not stand for re-election and would retire from parliament after the 2018 South Australian state election.

Parliament of South Australia
Preceded by Bob Sneath	President of the South Australian Legislative Council; 2012–2014	Succeeded by Russell Wortley
