= Electoral district of Mallee =

Former South Australian state electoral district

Coordinates: 35°S 140°E

Mallee South Australia—House of Assembly
- State: South Australia
- Created: 1970
- Abolished: 1985
- Namesake: Murray Mallee
- Demographic: Rural

Mallee was an electoral district of the House of Assembly in the Australian state of South Australia from 1970 to 1985.

Mallee was abolished at the 1983 boundary redistribution, replaced by the Electoral district of Murray-Mallee from 1985. The last member for Mallee, Peter Lewis, went on to represent Murray-Mallee from December 1985.

== Members ==
Member	Party	Term
Bill Nankivell	Liberal and Country	1970–1974
Bill Nankivell	Liberal	1974–1979
Peter Lewis	Liberal	1979–1985
