= Reggie Martin =

Australian politician

The Honourable Reggie Martin MLC
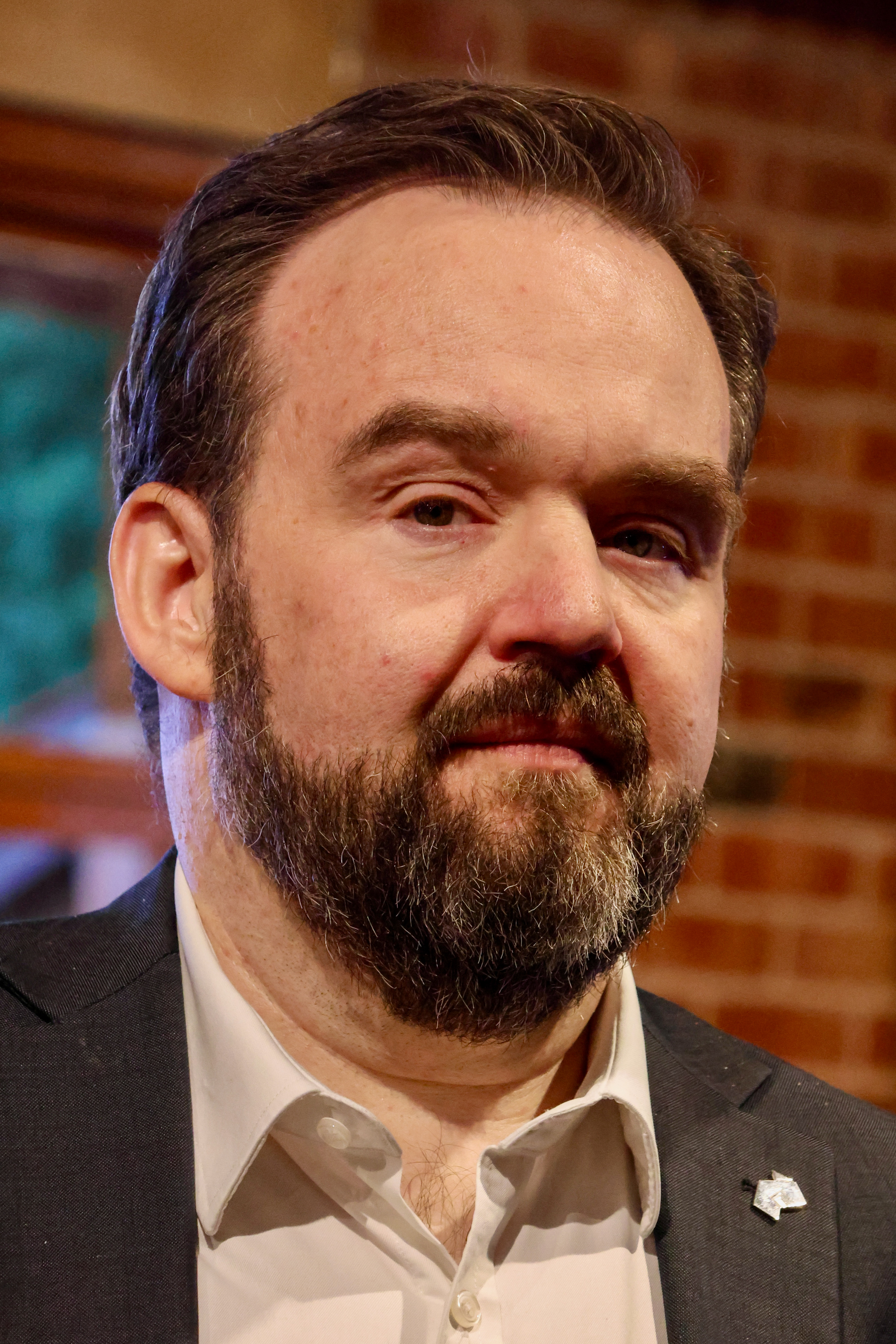
- Martin at Adelaide University in 2026

President of the South Australian Legislative Council
- Incumbent
- Assumed office 5 May 2026
- Preceded by: Terry Stephens

Member of the South Australian Legislative Council
- Incumbent
- Assumed office 19 March 2022
- Preceded by: Rob Lucas

Personal details
- Born: Reggie Brian Martin; 22 November 1978 (age 47) Henley Beach, South Australia
- Party: Labor
- Education: University of Adelaide
- Profession: Union official
- Website: reggiemartin.com.au

Reggie Brian Martin (born 27 November 1978) is an Australian politician. He has been a Labor member of the South Australian Legislative Council since the 2022 state election.

Martin was born in Port Adelaide and was educated at Taperoo High School and the University of Adelaide. He became an official in the Shop, Distributive and Allied Employees Association and rose to become assistant secretary of the state Labor Party in 2011 and state secretary from 2012.

Martin was elected President of the South Australian Legislative Council on 5 May 2026, assuming the position after Labor's victory at the 2026 state election.
