= Dorothy Coombe =

Dorothy Sargent Coombe (17 March 1896 – 27 November 1982) was an early Australian trade unionist. She was a long-running assistant secretary of the Australian Government Workers Association, setting a record in this capacity, and was the first woman in South Australia to advocate in the Industrial Court. She was often referred to as Miss Coombe.

Coombe began with the Government Workers Association as a typist, and was subsequently promoted to assistant secretary in 1917. She also served a stint as union treasurer from 1919 alongside her existing role. She was described as "one of the most popular union officials in the state" in 1920, winning recognition for "her special efforts on behalf of the association during the tribunal and reference board cases". In 1928, she became the first woman in South Australia to appear before the Industrial Court in the absence of union secretary Frank Nieass. It was reported in 1930 that she had been appointed union secretary upon Nieass' election to parliament, which would have made her one of the first woman union secretaries in Australia; however, Nieass was ultimately reappointed as a part-time secretary following a restructure of union management. She retired from the union as assistant secretary on 6 August 1948 after 32 years with the union; it was reported that her service was "believed to be a record for a woman union official".
