= Henry Mathwin =

English schoolmaster and cricketer

Henry Mathwin (23 August 1852 – 31 December 1911) was an English schoolmaster and cricketer who played in one first-class cricket match for Cambridge University in 1874. He was born at Bolton le Moors, Lancashire and died at Birkdale, also then in Lancashire.

Mathwin was educated at Bickerton House School, a school in Birkdale set up by his father, who shared his full name, and at Christ's College, Cambridge. As a cricketer, he was a middle-order batsman in his single first-class match, though it is not known if he was right- or left-handed; he scored 17 and was 1 not out when the university team won the match.

Mathwin became a schoolmaster when he left Cambridge University; he eventually succeeded his father as headmaster of Bickerton House School in Birkdale, though had given up the position before he died aged 59.
