= 1985 South Australian state election =

- 7 December 1985

All 47 seats in the South Australian House of Assembly 24 seats were needed for a majority 11 (of the 22) seats in the South Australian Legislative Council
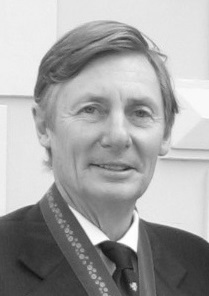

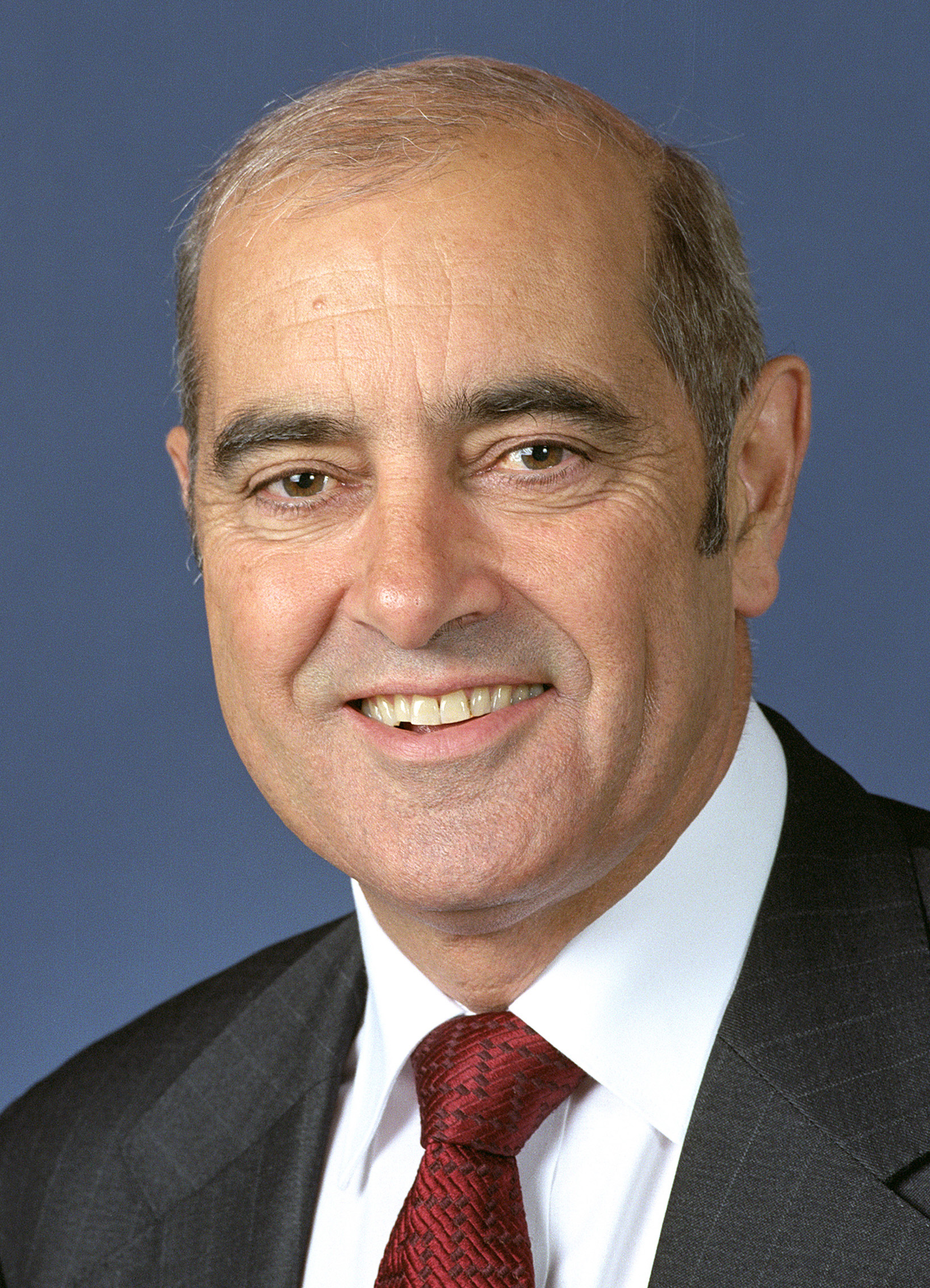
	First party	Second party	Third party
			NAT
Leader	John Bannon	John Olsen	Peter Blacker
Party	Labor	Liberal	National
Leader since	18 September 1979	10 November 1982
Leader's seat	Ross Smith	Custance	Flinders
Seats before	23	21	1
Seats won	27	16	1
Seat change	▲4	▼5	Steady
Popular vote	393,652	344,337	14,056
Percentage	48.19%	42.15%	1.72%
Swing	▲1.91	▼0.52	▼0.60
TPP	53.2%	46.8%
TPP swing	▲2.2	▼2.2
Premier before election
John Bannon
Labor
Elected Premier
John Bannon
Labor

State elections were held in South Australia on 7 December 1985. All 47 seats in the South Australian House of Assembly were up for election. The incumbent Australian Labor Party led by Premier of South Australia John Bannon increased its majority, and defeated the Liberal Party of Australia led by Leader of the Opposition John Olsen.

== Background ==
Parliamentary elections for both houses of the Parliament of South Australia were held in South Australia on 7 December 1985, which saw John Bannon and the Australian Labor Party win a second successive term, against the Liberal Party of Australia opposition led by John Olsen.

Labor won the election with an increased majority–at the time, the biggest majority it had held since the end of the Playmander, a record that would stand until 2006. The Liberal Party retained John Olsen as leader, partly because his main rival Dean Brown lost his seat to Independent Liberal Stan Evans. Evans rejoined the Liberal Party soon after the election.

In the South Australian Legislative Council, Labor won one seat from the Liberals, while the Democrats maintained their 2 seats. This shift gave the Australian Democrats sole balance of power. They would continue to hold it until the 1997 election.

== Key dates ==
- Issue of writ: 10 November 1985
- Close of nominations: 22 November 1985
- Polling day: 7 December 1985
- Return of writ: On or before 2 January 1986

== Results ==
=== House of Assembly ===
South Australian state election, 7 December 1985 House of Assembly << 1982–1989 >>
Enrolled voters	905,507				
Votes cast	846,289		Turnout	93.46	+0.28
Informal votes	29,401		Informal	3.47	–2.31
Summary of votes by party
Party	Primary votes	%	Swing	Seats	Change
Labor	393,652	48.19	+1.91	27	+ 4
Liberal	344,337	42.15	–0.52	16	– 5
Democrats	34,732	4.25	–2.87	0	0
National	14,056	1.72	–0.60	1	0
Independent Labor	18,641	2.28	*	2	0
Independent	5,368	0.66	–0.94	0	0
Independent Liberal	5,224	0.64	*	1	+ 1
Other	878	0.11	*	0	0
Total	816,888			47	
Two-party-preferred
Labor	434,325	53.17	+2.23		
Liberal	382,563	46.83	–2.23		

Popular vote
Labor	48.19%
Liberal	42.15%
Democrats	4.25%
Independents	3.58%
National	1.72%
Others	0.11%

Two-party-preferred vote
Labor	53.17%
Liberal	46.83%

Seats
Labor	57.45%
Liberal	34.04%
Independents	6.38%
National	2.13%

=== Legislative Council ===
South Australian state election, 7 December 1985 Legislative Council << 1982–1989 >>
Enrolled voters	905,507				
Votes cast	846,250		Turnout	93.46	+0.67
Informal votes	31,312		Informal	3.70	–6.37
Summary of votes by party
Party	Primary votes	%	Swing	Seats won	Seats held
Labor	391,076	47.99	+0.40	5	10
Liberal	320,055	39.27	–2.15	5	10
Democrats	44,988	5.52	–0.04	1	2
Call to Australia	24,666	3.03	+3.03	0	0
National	13,276	1.63	–0.37	0	0
Nuclear Disarmament	12,098	1.48	+1.48	0	0
Other	8,779	1.08	*	0	0
Total	814,938			11	22

== Seats changing hands ==
Seat	Pre-1985			Swing	Post-1985		
Seat	Party	Member	Margin	Swing	Margin	Member	Party
Bright	Liberal	Notional - New Seat	1.0	2.6	1.6	Derek Robertson	Labor
Davenport	Liberal	Dean Brown	22.0	N/A	2.6	Stan Evans	Independent
Fisher	Liberal	Stan Evans*	2.1	3.2	1.1	Philip Tyler	Labor

- In addition, Independent MP for Elizabeth, Martyn Evans retained his seat after winning it from Labor at the 1984 by-election.
- Sitting Liberal MP for Fisher, Stan Evans quit the party and contested Davenport as an Independent, and won.

=== Redistribution affected seats ===
Seat	1982 election			1983 redistribution			Swing	1985 election		
Seat	Party	Member	Margin	Party	Member	Margin	Swing	Margin	Member	Party
Adelaide	Labor	Jack Wright	15.6	Liberal	Notional	2.8	-3.4	0.6	Mike Duigan	Labor
Newland	Labor	John Klunder*	3.6	Liberal	Notional	1.0	-2.5	1.5	Di Gayler	Labor
Todd	Liberal	Scott Ashenden*	1.4	Labor	Notional	2.0	+3.9	5.9	John Klunder	Labor

- Sitting Labor MP for Newland, John Klunder instead contested Todd, and won.
- Sitting Liberal MP for Todd, Scott Ashenden instead contested Newland, and lost.

== Post-election pendulum ==
Labor seats (27)
Marginal
Adelaide	Mike Duigan	ALP	0.6%
Fisher	Philip Tyler	ALP	1.1%
Newland	Di Gayler	ALP	1.5%
Bright	Derek Robertson	ALP	1.6%
Hayward	June Appleby	ALP	2.8%
Unley	Kym Mayes	ALP	5.0%
Todd	John Klunder	ALP	5.9%
Fairly safe
Norwood	Greg Crafter	ALP	6.3%
Henley Beach	Don Ferguson	ALP	7.3%
Florey	Robert Gregory	ALP	8.2%
Safe
Walsh	John Trainer	ALP	10.7%
Hartley	Terry Groom	ALP	12.5%
Albert Park	Kevin Hamilton	ALP	12.9%
Mitchell	Ron Payne	ALP	13.5%
Baudin	Don Hopgood	ALP	13.7%
Gilles	Jack Slater	ALP	14.2%
Peake	Keith Plunkett	ALP	15.7%
Mawson	Susan Lenehan	ALP	16.1%
Whyalla	Frank Blevins	ALP	17.0%
Briggs	Mike Rann	ALP	17.4%
Spence	Roy Abbott	ALP	18.4%
Ross Smith	John Bannon	ALP	18.7%
Playford	Terry McRae	ALP	19.4%
Stuart	Gavin Keneally	ALP	22.0%
Napier	Terry Hemmings	ALP	23.5%
Ramsay	Lynn Arnold	ALP	24.2%
Price	Murray De Laine	ALP	24.3%

Liberal seats (16)
Marginal
Hanson	Heini Becker	LIB	0.9%
Morphett	John Oswald	LIB	4.7%
Fairly safe
Mitcham	Stephen Baker	LIB	8.3%
Coles	Jennifer Adamson	LIB	8.4%
Heysen	David Wotton	LIB	8.8%
Light	Bruce Eastick	LIB	9.3%
Mount Gambier	Harold Allison	LIB	9.9%
Safe
Kavel	Stephen Baker	LIB	11.0%
Goyder	John Meier	LIB	12.4%
Alexandra	Ted Chapman	LIB	15.2%
Eyre	Graham Gunn	LIB	15.8%
Chaffey	Peter Arnold	LIB	16.3%
Custance	John Olsen	LIB	16.3%
Bragg	Graham Ingerson	LIB	17.5%
Victoria	Dale Baker	LIB	18.3%
Murray-Mallee	Peter Lewis	LIB	18.6%
Crossbench seats (4)
Davenport	Stan Evans	IND	2.8% v LIB
Elizabeth	Martyn Evans	IND	4.0% v ALP
Semaphore	Norm Peterson	IND	7.3% v ALP
Flinders	Peter Blacker	NAT	8.3% v LIB

== See also ==
- Candidates of the South Australian state election, 1985
- Results of the South Australian state election, 1985 (House of Assembly)
- Results of the 1985 South Australian state election (Legislative Council)
- Members of the South Australian House of Assembly, 1985-1989
- Members of the South Australian Legislative Council, 1985-1989
