= John Fulbrook =

Australian politician

John Fulbrook MP
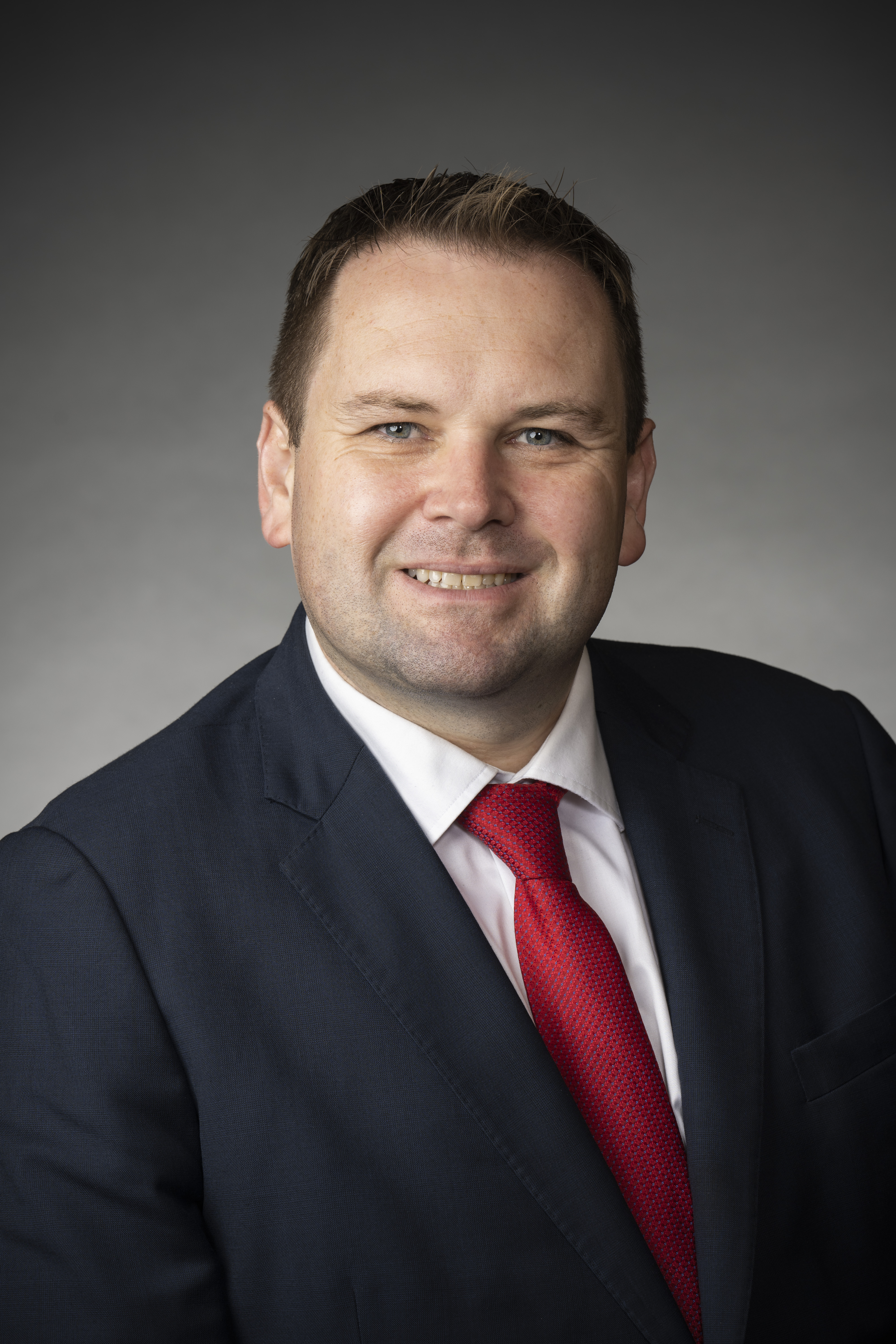

Member of the South Australian House of Assembly for Playford
- Incumbent
- Assumed office 19 March 2022
- Preceded by: Michael Brown

Personal details
- Born: 13 February 1980 (age 46) Reading, England
- Party: Labor
- Education: Heathfield High School, Flinders University, Edith Cowan University.

John Paul Fulbrook is an Australian politician. He has been a Labor Party member of the South Australian House of Assembly since the 2022 state election, representing Playford. Fulbrook holds an arts degree from Flinders University and a business degree from Edith Cowan University. Before entering parliament, he worked his first job in retail, followed by the Property Council of Australia, Immigration Department and SA Department for Education. He later served as an advisor to the Rann and Weatherill governments, followed by a period advising in planning to the Northern Territory Government.

During his first term in Parliament, Fulbrook led calls to increase urban densities around railway lines, to encourage urban regeneration around existing infrastructure, while also bolstering public transport patronage. As a backbencher, he moved to clarify the legal position regarding council by-laws and minors’ access to public toilets, helping remove ambiguity around the issue.

Like many of his political colleagues, Fulbrook received an indefinite ban to enter Russia, following his criticism of the Putin regime within State Parliament. During this debate, he presented that South Australians had no issue with the Russian people and could clearly draw the distinction between the broader population and the tyranny of Russia's leadership.

Despite a general swing towards One Nation in Adelaide's northern suburbs at the 2026 South Australian Election, Fulbrook bucked the trend, gaining a 0.9% two party preferred swing in his favour.

== Personal life ==
Fulbrook lives in his electorate in Parafield Gardens with his son. In October 2025, his wife, Briony, died after a battle with cancer.

South Australian House of Assembly
Preceded by Michael Brown	Member for Playford; 2022–present	Incumbent
