= Bill Nankivell =

Australian politician (1923–2024)

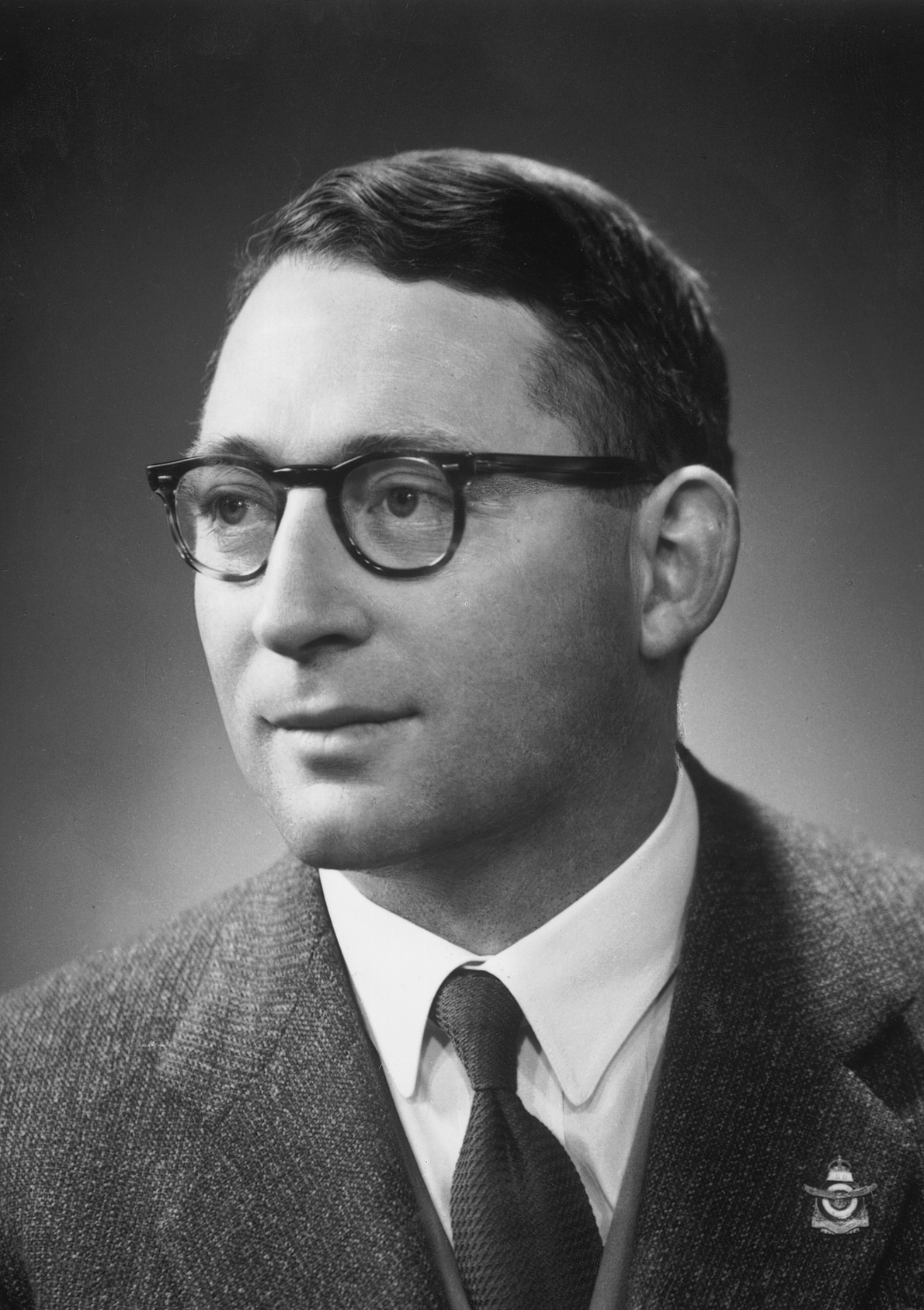

Chairman of the Committee on Land Settlement
- In office 24 October 1963 – 31 December 1965

Member of the South Australian House of Assembly
- In office 7 March 1959 – 15 September 1979
- Preceded by: Malcolm McIntosh
- Succeeded by: Peter Lewis
- Constituency: Albert (1959–1970); Mallee (1970–1979)

Personal details
- Born: William Field Nankivell; 7 September 1923 Mount Gambier, South Australia, Australia
- Died: 11 June 2024 (aged 100)
- Party: Liberal Party
- Spouse: Diane Basse (m. 1947; d. 2016)
- Occupation: Farmer, company director

William Field Nankivell (7 September 1923 – 11 June 2024) was an Australian politician.

He was born in Mount Gambier and served in the Royal Australian Air Force during World War II from 1944 to 1945. He was a farmer and company director before entering politics. He represented the South Australian House of Assembly seats of Albert from 1959 to 1970 and Mallee from 1970 to 1979 for the Liberal and Country League and Liberal Party. He was a member of the Parliamentary Committee on Land Settlement (1963–1968), Parliamentary Standing Committee on Public Works (1968–1973) and Public Accounts Committee (1973–1977).

Nankivell died on 11 June 2024, at the age of 100.

Parliament of South Australia
Preceded by Malcolm McIntosh	Member for Albert; 1959–1970	Seat abolished
New seat	Member for Mallee; 1970–1979	Succeeded by Peter Lewis
