= John Cornwall (South Australian politician) =

John Robert Cornwall
- Born: 1 January 1935; Melbourne, Victoria, Australia
- Died: 1 August 2018 (aged 83); Sydney, Australia
- Occupations: Veterinarian, politician
- Known for: A active reforming politician who championed social justice and the Health for All agenda.

John Robert Cornwall (1 January 1935 – 1 August 2018) AO was a Labor member of the South Australian Legislative Council for 14 years, from 1975 to 1988. He was a senior member of the front bench for most of his political career.

He was a graduate in veterinary science from the University of Queensland where he lived at St Leo's College.

As Minister for Health in South Australia during the 1980s he introduced many reforms. His main claim to fame came in 1987-88 when he persuaded the reluctant Labor Premier of South Australia, John Bannon, to introduce a specially ear-marked tax on cigarettes (initially 50c/pk - later toned down to 5c/pk). The tax would be used to fund a buy-out sponsorships of both sporting organisations and prizes, and cultural/arts organisations by the tobacco industry who used the branding of events as an alternate form of advertising. Until that date (13 Apr 1988) the tobacco companies had used sports and arts sponsorships to create powerful allies who were always guaranteed to feature in opposition to any government actions which threatened to limit cigarette sales. They also had the commercial media on side.

Geoff Bible, the Australian CEO of Philip Morris in New York described the earmarking as a "stroke of genius" because the industry couldn't find a way to counter it. Cigarette sponsorship was allowed for a couple of international events (the Australian Grand Prix, and Benson & Hedges Test Cricket), but from that point on, sportsmen and their organisations never seriously supported the industry again.

== Veterinary career ==
Born in Bendigo, Victoria, Australia, John Cornwall studied at Queensland University graduating with a Bachelor of Veterinary Science in the 1950s. He ran veterinary practices in Mount Gambier and in Adelaide from 1961 to 1975.

== Political career ==
Dr Cornwall served for more than six years in the State Cabinet, first as Minister for Environment and Lands in 1979, and then as Minister of Health and Community Services in two John Bannon governments, from 1982 to the end of 1988.

In the 1980s state health Ministers faced a number of challenges, among them Commonwealth-State financial arrangements under a new Medicare agreement, the structure of the State's health care delivery system, and questions about social justice and equity in public health. Dr Cornwall tightened central government control on hospital administration to improve public accountability and allow hospital services to be shared across the system to better meet patient needs and reduce waiting times.

Dr Cornwall fostered a new approach to health care in Australia that was inspired by the Health For All agenda of the World Health Organization in the 1970s. It championed people increasing control over and improving their health, and viewed health status as inextricably linked to social well-being and economic conditions.

Dr Cornwall championed the development of health and community services for disadvantaged groups, such as women's health services, Aboriginal health services, child and adolescent mental health services, and child protection services. He developed a community-based system of health care that linked health care services to specific population or geographic areas, with funding granted on the basis of the needs of those areas. As part of these reforms a proportion of health care funds were reallocated from hospitals into areas of social disadvantage, resulting in better access to health services for people in social need.

Between 1983 and 1987, Dr Cornwall led the effort to clear environmental lead pollutants in Port Pirie, a town in South Australia whose economy is based on a major lead smelter. The project is widely regarded as one of the most significant public health projects among developed countries.

Dr Cornwall ran an anti-smoking program and introduced Australia's first comprehensive legislative package to restrict tobacco advertising in cinemas, prohibit tobacco sponsorship of sporting events, and establish an independent trust to provide replacement funding for sponsorship of sport and cultural activities (Foundation South Australia). The legislation was significant in paving the way for reforms in other states and the Commonwealth. It set a standard that eventually most of the world followed.

Dr Cornwall introduced legislation decriminalising possession of small quantities of cannabis. He introduced the legislation as a private members bill, having secured support for the policy at the Labor Party convention. He was motivated by a strong belief that decriminalisation would break the nexus between soft and hard drugs, which cause much greater harm to individuals and society.

Cornwall's ministerial career came to an end on 4 August 1988 following a highly controversial defamation case in which he was sued by an orthopaedic surgeon over comments made at the height of public debate over the introduction of Medicare in 1984. Cornwall was advised by Cabinet to resign from his ministerial post, which he subsequently did. In his most recent political memoir 'After Work, After Play, After All', John Cornwall writes of the political and personal pressures at play behind the scenes at the time. Cornwall then resigned from parliament on 31 January 1989.

== Post politics ==
Cornwall pursued a third career outside politics from 1989. He moved to Sydney to take up senior executive roles for non-government organisations in the human and companion animal health arenas.

He was chief executive officer of the Australian Veterinary Association (AVA) from 1989 to 1991, and was awarded the AVA Meritorious Service Award 'for outstanding services' in 1991.

He was director of the Australian Youth Foundation from 1992 to 1995, where he conducted research on the needs of disadvantaged young people, culminating in a report entitled "The Lost Generation".

From 1997 he was managing consultant for the Delta Society Australia – an organisation that promotes positive interaction between people and companion animals, particularly pet dogs. His flagship programs were a vocational course for behavioural pet dog trainers, a dog safe program for junior primary school children, and the pet partners program providing trained therapy dogs in hospitals, nursing homes, and rehabilitation centres. During this time he co-authored an article on preventing dog bites in children, published in the British Medical Journal.

He retired in 2007 and joined the Horn of Africa Relief and Development Agency as a volunteer, where he served as president and executive director before his retirement in 2014.

He was awarded an Order of Australia posthumously in the Queen's birthday honours in June 2019.

As a result of his work with HARDA he received the prestigious Australia Abyssinian Award in 2010, an award to individuals who have made outstanding contributions to supporting migrants, refugees and community harmony.

== Family life ==
In 1956 John Cornwall married his wife Patrice. They have one son, six daughters, and many grandchildren.
