= John Quirke (politician) =

Australian politician

Senator for South Australia
- In office 18 September 1997 – 15 August 2000
- Preceded by: Dominic Foreman
- Succeeded by: Geoff Buckland

Member of the South Australian Parliament for Playford
- In office 25 November 1989 – 17 September 1997
- Preceded by: Terry McRae
- Succeeded by: Jack Snelling

Personal details
- Born: 9 September 1950 (age 75) Birkenhead, Cheshire, England
- Party: Australian Labor Party

John Andrew Quirke (born 9 September 1950) is a former Australian politician. He served as a Senator for South Australia from 1997 to 2000, representing the Australian Labor Party (ALP). He previously served in the South Australian House of Assembly from 1989 to 1997, holding the seat of Playford.

== Early life ==
Quirke was born in Birkenhead, Cheshire, England, the son of Mary (née McKeone) and William Patrick Quirke. His father was a fitter at a shipbuilding company on the Mersey. The family immigrated to Australia as Ten Pound Poms in 1959. They settled in Adelaide, South Australia, where Quirke attended Elizabeth High School. He subsequently graduated from the University of Adelaide with a Bachelor of Arts and a Diploma of Education. From 1973 to 1977 Quirke was a history teacher at Craigmore High School. He then transferred to Concordia College, a Lutheran school.

== Politics ==
=== Early involvement ===
Quirke joined the ALP in 1979 and served as president of its Mount Lofty branch. He was elected to the state executive in 1986 and was a delegate to the Australian Labor Party National Conference. He first stood for parliament at the 1984 federal election, losing to Alexander Downer in the Division of Mayo. He then stood unsuccessfully for the seat of Alexandra at the 1985 South Australian state election. In the same year he joined the staff of Senator Dominic Foreman.

=== State politics ===
Quirke was elected to the South Australian House of Assembly at the 1989 state election, retaining the seat of Playford for the Labor Party following the retirement of Terry McRae. As a backbencher he was known as a strong opponent of the Multifunction Polis development. He was re-elected at the 1993 election, which saw the defeat of the incumbent ALP government, and subsequently joined Mike Rann's shadow cabinet. He held numerous portfolios, including that of Shadow Treasurer from February 1994. Quirke was originally a member of the party's Centre Left faction, but joined the Labor Right faction in 1995 as part of a mass defection following a preselection dispute. He was known as a factional powerbroker.

=== Senate ===
In September 1997, Quirke resigned his seat in the House of Assembly in order to be appointed to the Senate, filling a casual vacancy caused by the resignation of Dominic Foreman. He was elected in his own right at the 1998 federal election and was subsequently elected as a deputy whip. Quirke chaired the Select Committee on the Socio-Economic Consequences of the National Competition Policy, which was established in 1998 and reported in 2000. He supported the "Yes" vote in the 1999 Australian republic referendum.

Quirke resigned from the Senate due to ill health in August 2000, following a collapse at an ALP conference. Geoff Buckland was chosen as his replacement.

== Later career ==
Quirke and his wife operate a lobbying firm called Pallidon. The firm gifted the Australian Labor Party some $11,000 in 2010 while employed by two major corporations seeking public works contracts. In 2016, the Australian Taxation Office applied to wind up Pallidon.

Quirke also served as a non-executive director of copper miner Hillgrove Resources from 2005 to 2013.

== Personal life ==
Quirke has four children with his wife Davina. He suffers from Type 2 diabetes.
