= George Weatherill (politician) =

Australian politician (1936–2021)

Member of the South Australian Legislative Council
- In office 11 February 1986 – 1 September 2000

Personal details
- Born: 1 October 1936 Hartlepool, County Durham, England
- Died: 23 January 2021 (aged 84) Adelaide, Australia
- Party: Labor Party
- Children: Jay Weatherill
- Profession: wharf labourer, union official, member of parliament

George Weatherill (1 October 1936 – 23 January 2021) was an Australian politician and Deputy Leader of the South Australian Labor Party. From 1986 until 2000 he represented the Labor Party in the South Australian Legislative Council.

Weatherill came from England's industrial north. In Australia, he stacked wool on Port Adelaide's wharves before becoming an official with the Australian Government Workers Association (AGWA). He was the father of Jay Weatherill who was Premier of South Australia between 2011 and 2018.

Highly respected as an effective negotiator and organiser he was instrumental in 'cleaning up' aspects of the AGWA administration which was adversely affected by the "Thompson" affair – whereby the former AGWA Secretary absconded with union funds.
