= Alison Dolling =

Australian writer

- Born: 29 August 1917; St Peters, South Australia
- Died: 25 July 2006 (aged 88)
- Education: University of Adelaide
- Occupation: Writer
- Writing career
- Pen name: Mary Broughton
- Period: 1966–2005
- Notable works: Chronicle Cameos (1977); The History of Marion on the Sturt (1981); A Child Went Forth (2005)

Alison Mary Dolling (29 August 1917 – 25 July 2006), also known by the pen-name Mary Broughton, was an Australian writer.

== Biography ==
She was born at St Peters in Adelaide, 29 August 1917. Her parents were Edward Bruno Dolling and Amy Caroline, née Thiselton. She attended Ellerslie College in Tranmere and Methodist Ladies' College in Wayville, before studying journalism at the University of Washington, Seattle University, and University of California, Berkeley. After a period in England studying at King's College London, she returned to Australia and finally graduated with a Bachelor of Arts in Classics from the University of Adelaide. Dolling then worked as a secondary school teacher from 1941, and was also a part-time lecturer at the Adelaide Kindergarten Training College, teaching Australian literature and the history of education. In 1962 she was appointed the editor of Opinion, the journal of the South Australian English Teachers' Association.

Dolling was appointed women's editor of The Chronicle in 1966, using the pen-name Mary Broughton; she held the position until the Chronicle was discontinued in 1975. In 1977 she published a compilation of her writings entitled Chronicle Cameos, and in 1981 published a history of Marion, The History of Marion on the Sturt. The two books were runners-up for the Alexander Henderson Award, which is given by the Australian Institute of Genealogical Studies. Dolling continued to be active in the area of genealogical and women's history, serving as editor of From Shadows into Light, a study of South Australian women artists, in 1988. Her last book, a memoir entitled A Child Went Forth, was published in 2005.
