= John Mathwin =

Australian politician

John Mathwin OAM (20 June 1919 – 18 June 2004) was an Australian politician. He was the Liberal candidate for the 1955 election for the federal seat of Bonython, but was easily defeated. He was elected as the member for Glenelg in the South Australian House of Assembly in 1970 and held the seat until its abolition in 1985. He stood for Bright at the 1985 election, however he was defeated.

He received the Medal of the Order of Australia in June 2001 for service to the community, to local government and to the South Australian Parliament.

Mathwin brought his family to Australia in the 1950s under the Ten Pound Poms scheme and features in the 1997 BBC documentary of the same name.

Parliament of South Australia
Preceded by Hugh Hudson	Member for Glenelg; 1970–1985	District abolished
