= Jamie Irwin =

Australian politician

James Campbell "Jamie" Irwin (16 April 1937 – 4 November 2005) was an Australian politician. He was a Liberal member of the South Australian Legislative Council from 1985 to 2002. From 1997 to 2002 he was President of the Council.

Parliament of South Australia
Preceded by Peter Dunn	President of the South Australian Legislative Council; 1997–2002	Succeeded by Ron Roberts
