= Carolyn Pickles (politician) =

Australian politician

The Honourable Carolyn Pickles

Member of the South Australian Legislative Council
- In office 7 December 1985 – 8 February 2002

Personal details
- Born: Carolyn Ann Latta; 2 May 1941 (age 85) Midsummer Norton, England
- Party: Labor Party
- Spouse: ??? (m. 1957; died 1975)
- Education: West of England College of Commerce

Carolyn Ann Pickles (born 2 May 1941) is a former Australian politician. She was a Labor member of the South Australian Legislative Council from 1985 to 2002. She was one of the founders of EMILY's List Australia, a Labor organisation dedicated to promoting women seeking public office. From 1989 to 1993, she served as Government Whip in the Legislative Council. From 1994, she served as Leader of the Opposition in the Legislative Council, being the first woman elected to lead a major Australian political party in any chamber in South Australia. She was also shadow minister for a number of portfolios.
