= Peter Dunn (politician) =

Australian politician

The Honourable Peter Dunn

15th President of the South Australian Legislative Council
- In office 10 February 1994 – 13 September 1997
- Preceded by: Gordon Bruce
- Succeeded by: Jamie Irwin

Member of the South Australian Legislative Council
- In office 6 November 1982 – 13 September 1997

Personal details
- Born: 11 September 1935 (age 90) Cowell, South Australia
- Party: Liberal Party
- Spouse: Heather Dunn
- Children: 2 (Sons)
- Education: Prince Alfred College
- Alma mater: University of Adelaide (RDA)
- Occupation: Farmer, politician

Henry Peter Kestel Dunn (11 September 1935) is a former Australian politician. He was a Liberal member of the South Australian Legislative Council from 1982 to 1997, and served as the President of the Council from 1994 to 1997.

== Early life and education ==
Dunn was born in Cowell, a rural town on South Australia's Eyre Peninsula on 11 September 1935.

Dunn received his secondary education at Prince Alfred College in Adelaide, before attending the University of Adelaide's Roseworthy Campus, where he received a Diploma in Agriculture (RDA) in 1956. Following graduation, Peter Dunn returned to his family's Eyre Peninsula farm at Rudal, where he was an active community member.

South Australian Legislative Council
Preceded by Gordon Bruce	President of the South Australian Legislative Council; 1994–1997	Succeeded by Jamie Irwin
