= Gordon Bruce (politician) =

Australian politician (1930–1995)

Gordon Lindsay Bruce (9 May 1930 – 9 January 1995) was an Australian politician. He was a Labor member of the South Australian Legislative Council from 1979 to 1993. From 1989 to 1993 he was President of the Council.

Parliament of South Australia
Preceded by Anne Levy	President of the South Australian Legislative Council; 1989–1993	Succeeded by Peter Dunn
