= Brian Chatterton =

Australian politician

Brian Alfred Chatterton (born 1941) is a former Australian politician.

Chatterton was elected as a Labor member of the South Australian Legislative Council in 1973. In 1975 he was appointed Minister for Agriculture, Fisheries and Forests, serving until Labor's defeat in 1979. In 1982, he resumed his old portfolios, holding them until he retired to the backbench in 1983. Chatterton retired from politics in 1987.
