= Terry McRae =

Australian politician and lawyer

Speaker of the South Australian House of Assembly
- In office 8 December 1982 – 11 February 1986
- Preceded by: Bruce Eastick
- Succeeded by: John Trainer

Member of the South Australian House of Assembly for Playford
- In office 30 May 1970 – 24 November 1989
- Preceded by: New district
- Succeeded by: John Quirke

Personal details
- Born: Terence Michael McRae; 11 January 1941 Adelaide, South Australia
- Died: 5 August 2006 (aged 65) AAMI Stadium, West Lakes, Adelaide
- Cause of death: Heart attack
- Party: Australian Labor Party
- Spouse: Doreen
- Children: Jeremy, Sarah and Rebecca
- Education: St Ignatius College
- Alma mater: University of Adelaide
- Profession: Lawyer

Terence Michael McRae (11 January 1941 – 5 August 2006) was an Australian politician and lawyer. He was a member of the Labor Party and member for the South Australian House of Assembly seat of Playford from 1970 to 1989.

== Early life ==
McRae was born in 1941 to Irish Australian parents. He went to school at Saint Ignatius' College then studied law at the University of Adelaide and was admitted to the bar in 1963.

== Politics ==
McRae first attempted to get elected to the seat of Torrens in 1968 but was defeated. He was successful at being elected to Playford in 1970.

As Speaker of the South Australian House of Assembly from 1982 to 1986 for the John Bannon Labor government he was responsible for the introduction of television coverage to South Australian Parliament.

== Later life ==
After leaving parliament he resumed his law career. McRae died in 2006 while watching a football game at AAMI Stadium. He was survived by his wife Doreen and three children Jeremy, Sarah and Rebecca.

Parliament of South Australia
New district	Member for Playford; 1970–1989	Succeeded by John Quirke
Preceded by Bruce Eastick	Speaker of the South Australian House of Assembly; 1982–1986	Succeeded by John Trainer
