= Electoral district of Murray-Mallee =

Former South Australian state electoral district

Murray-Mallee South Australia—House of Assembly
- State: South Australia
- Created: 1985
- Abolished: 1993
- Namesake: Murray Mallee
- Demographic: Rural
- Coordinates: 35°S 140°E

Footnotes
- coordinates

Murray-Mallee was an electoral district of the House of Assembly in the Australian state of South Australia from 1985 to 1993.

Murray-Mallee was created in a boundary redistribution in 1985, replacing the Electoral district of Mallee. The last member for Mallee, Peter Lewis, became the first representative for Murray-Mallee in December 1985.

Murray-Mallee was abolished in a boundary redistribution in 1993, replaced in part by the Electoral district of Ridley. The member for Murray-Mallee, Peter Lewis, went on to represent Ridley from December 1993.

== Member ==
Member	Party	Term
Peter Lewis	Liberal	1985–1993
