= Electoral district of Playford =

South Australian state electoral district

Playford South Australia—House of Assembly
- Interactive map of electoral district boundaries from the 2022 state election (Note: The electorate will have no change in boundaries at the 2026 state election.)
- State: South Australia
- Created: 1970
- MP: John Fulbrook
- Party: Labor
- Namesake: Thomas Playford IV
- Electors: 26,897 (2026)
- Area: 17.0 km^{2} (6.6 sq mi)
- Demographic: Metropolitan
- Coordinates: 34°47′24″S 138°36′58″E
Electorates around Playford:
Taylor	Ramsay	Ramsay
Taylor	Playford	Florey
Port Adelaide	Florey	Florey

Playford is a single-member electoral district for the South Australian House of Assembly. Named after the long serving South Australian premier Tom Playford, it is a suburban electorate in Adelaide's north, taking in the suburbs of Green Fields, Parafield Gardens, Salisbury Downs and parts of Mawson Lakes and Paralowie.

== History ==
Playford was created at the 1970 election, when Tom Playford was still alive, where it was won by Labor candidate Terry McRae. At the 1989 election, McRae resigned from politics, with the seat won by Labor candidate John Quirke. Though typically a safe Labor seat, the seat technically became marginal, reduced to just a 2.7 percent two-party margin at the 1993 election landslide. At the 1997 election, Quirke resigned to enter the Australian Senate, with the seat won by Labor candidate Jack Snelling who remained as the member for 21 years until his retirement in 2018.

== Members for Playford ==
Member	Party	Term
Terry McRae	Labor	1970–1989
John Quirke	Labor	1989–1997
Jack Snelling	Labor	1997–2018
Michael Brown	Labor	2018–2022
John Fulbrook	Labor	2022–present

== Election results ==
2026 South Australian state election: Playford
Party	Candidate	Votes	%	±%
Labor	John Fulbrook	11,209	50.8	−2.7
One Nation	Nickolas Tsentidis	5,343	24.2	+24.2
Greens	David Wright	1,988	9.0	−0.5
Liberal	Christopher Jones	1,760	8.0	−16.7
Family First	Antonio Rangel	765	3.5	−4.5
Legalise Cannabis	Trent Oehme	526	2.4	+2.4
United Voice	Grace Bawden	206	0.9	+0.9
Australian Family	Richard Bunting	247	1.1	+1.1
Total formal votes		22,044	94.7	−1.0
Informal votes		1,238	5.3	+1.0
Turnout		23,282	86.6	−0.8
Two-candidate-preferred result
Labor	John Fulbrook	14,809	67.2	+0.9
One Nation	Nickolas Tsentidis	7,239	32.8	+32.8
Labor hold				
