= Peter Lewis (politician) =

Australian politician

The Honourable Peter Lewis

Speaker of the South Australian House of Assembly
- In office 5 March 2002 – 4 April 2005
- Preceded by: John Oswald
- Succeeded by: Bob Such

Member of the South Australian Parliament for Hammond
- In office 11 October 1997 – 17 March 2006
- Preceded by: District created
- Succeeded by: Adrian Pederick

Member of the South Australian Parliament for Ridley
- In office 11 December 1993 – 10 October 1997
- Preceded by: District created
- Succeeded by: District abolished

Member of the South Australian Parliament for Murray-Mallee
- In office 7 December 1985 – 10 December 1993
- Preceded by: District created
- Succeeded by: District abolished

Member of the South Australian Parliament for Mallee
- In office 15 September 1979 – 6 December 1985
- Preceded by: Bill Nankivell
- Succeeded by: District abolished
- Majority: District created

Personal details
- Born: Ivan Peter Lewis; 1 January 1942 Gumeracha, South Australia
- Died: 25 September 2017 (aged 75) Sydney, Australia
- Party: Liberal (1979–2000); Independent (2000–2006)
- Spouse: Kerry Lewis
- Relations: Clifton Lewis (sibling), Keith Lewis (sibling), Milton Lewis (sibling),
- Education: University of Adelaide
- Occupation: Management Consultant

Ivan Peter Lewis (1 January 1942 – 26 September 2017) was an Australian politician. Lewis was a member of the South Australian House of Assembly between 1979 and 2006 in the electorates of Hammond, Ridley, Murray-Mallee and Mallee. From 1979 he was in the House as a Liberal member, however he was expelled from the Liberals in 2000. He was re-elected as an independent, serving until 2006. His decision to serve as Speaker of the South Australian House of Assembly for a Labor government resulted in Mike Rann becoming Premier of South Australia from the 2002 election. His death was reported on 28 September 2017 to have been earlier in the week, in Sydney.

== Party affiliation ==
Lewis was first elected at the 1979 election as a Liberal candidate. He quickly gained a reputation as a maverick, defying the party authorities on many an occasion. In July 2000, the Liberals finally lost patience with Lewis and expelled him, even though it cost them their majority.

At the 2002 election, Lewis contested his seat under the banner of the Community Leadership Independence Coalition (CLIC) and was re-elected. Three other CLIC candidates contested seats in the South Australian House of Assembly but failed. During the campaign, Lewis said he would support any government that would commit to a program of parliamentary reform, including Labor. When pressed by The Advertiser, Lewis denied his statement meant he may help Labor form government, saying "You can quote me: That is bullshit. Clear, unequivocal, hot, green, sloppy, fresh bullshit. I'm not into forming government with Labor".

== Support for Labor ==
At the 2002 election, with 24 seats required for a parliamentary majority, Labor won 23 seats, the Liberals won 20 seats, the SA Nationals won one seat, with three seats won by independents, including that of Lewis. Lewis negotiated with both Liberal leader and incumbent Premier Rob Kerin and Labor opposition leader Mike Rann. Eventually, Lewis agreed to support a Labor minority government on confidence and supply motions while retaining the right to vote on conscience. In return, Lewis became Speaker of the South Australian House of Assembly, Labor agreed to hold a Constitutional Convention, and Lewis gained concessions for his electorate including the phasing out of commercial fishing in the River Murray, prioritising the eradication of the branched broomrape weed, changing water rates for irrigation, fast-tracking a feasibility study for a weir and lock at Wellington, and improving rural roads.

Lewis' deal allowed Rann to form government by one seat. However, Kerin stated that since the Liberals had won the two-party vote on 50.9 percent, he would stay in office until Labor demonstrated it had support on the floor of the legislature. The House of Assembly reassembled earlier than normal after an election. With Lewis in the speaker's chair, Kerin moved a motion of confidence in his government. He lost, confirming Rann as premier. The Liberals hinted at challenging the result in Lewis' seat, but this did not eventuate.

However, the other two independents, Rory McEwen and Bob Such, and the SA Nationals member, Karlene Maywald, later also agreed to support the Rann government in return for cabinet or speaker positions.

== Speaker ==
As speaker, he earned widespread attention for his colourful style of regulating parliamentary debate. The Rann government held a Constitutional Convention as promised in 2003, and as an outcome organised what ended up as failed attempts at bills for optional preferential voting, citizen initiated referendums and four-year Upper House terms.

=== Terry Stephens ===
Lewis in 2002 faced media scrutiny over his links to businessman Terry Stephens (not to be confused with Liberal MP Terry Stephens) after claims were made in parliament, just prior to Lewis becoming speaker, by federal Liberal MP for Barker, Patrick Secker. Lewis was exonerated of any wrongdoing despite submitting himself to extensive police investigations. Stephens was later convicted of lying to smear Lewis.

=== Standfield, Utting and Ratcliff ===
In 2004 Lewis and some of his staffers, including two child abuse activists and volunteer staffers named Malcolm Barry Standfield and Wendy Utting, were speaking to 8 informants about alleged pedophiles. One of the most vocal informants was named Craig Ratcliff and whilst he was providing plausible information that he had been a victim himself, he had also been found guilty as a perpetrator and is recorded as a convicted child sex offender. Ratcliff was one of the informants who accused the MP during a television interview in August 2004. Ratcliff later recanted his claims, saying he realised the politician was not the man known as "Terry" who frequented gay beats in the late 1980s and early 1990s. He was subsequently convicted to a suspended prison sentence in 2008.

Another of those informants named Robert Woodland was found bashed to death on 8 December 2004 in the South Parklands. Then on 25 February 2005 another of the informants named Shaine Moore was found dead in suspicious circumstances.

In early March 2005 the media and the Labor Government narrowed down the allegations of a pedophile politician to a male Labor Politician. On 1 April 2005 Standfield and Utting faxed a press release, giving names of the alleged sitting MP and 2 policemen.

A police investigation of Standfield, Utting and Ratcliff started and all 3 were charged with criminal defamation. In 2008 the two volunteer staffers working in Lewis' Office, Standfield and Utting, were found not guilty of defamation over the claims. In December 2008 Ratcliff was sentenced for criminal defamation for the allegations.

=== Resignation ===
On 4 April 2005 Lewis faced a potential motion of no confidence, but before a vote could be taken he gave a speech in parliament then resigned as speaker.

== 2006 election ==
For the 2006 election, Lewis did not stand for his seat of Hammond, but instead stood as an independent for election to the Legislative Council. However he was not elected, receiving 0.6 percent of the statewide vote.

== 2009 mining interests ==
Lewis owned eight mining leases, as well as interests in Goldus Operations and Mintech Resources. It was reported that Lewis had sold his iron ore project at Razorback Ridge, 80 km east of Yunta, to Western Australia's Royal Resources for $30 million.

== Awards ==
Lewis was a 2004 awardee of the World Peace Prize.

Parliament of South Australia
| Preceded by Bill Nankivell | Member for Mallee; 1979–1985 | District abolished |
| New district | Member for Murray-Mallee; 1985–1993 | District abolished |
| New district | Member for Ridley; 1993–1997 | District abolished |
| New district | Member for Hammond; 1997–2006 | Succeeded by Adrian Pederick |
| Preceded by John Oswald | Speaker of the South Australian House of Assembly; 2002–2005 | Succeeded by Bob Such |
