= Results of the 1979 South Australian state election (House of Assembly) =

South Australian state election, 15 September 1979 House of Assembly << 1977–1982 >>
Enrolled voters	826,586				
Votes cast	769,080		Turnout	93.04	-0.33
Informal votes	34,104		Informal	4.43	+1.72
Summary of votes by party
Party	Primary votes	%	Swing	Seats	Change
Liberal	352,343	47.94	+6.73	24	+ 7
Labor	300,277	40.86	–10.78	20	– 7
Democrats	60,979	8.30	+4.82	1	± 0
National Country	14,013	1.91	+0.31	1	± 0
Independent	7,364	1.00	+0.61	1	+ 1
Total	734,976			47	
Two-party-preferred
Liberal	404,232	55.00	+8.40		
Labor	330,734	45.00	–8.40		

This is a list of House of Assembly results for the 1979 South Australian state election.

== Results by electoral district ==
=== Adelaide ===
1979 South Australian state election: Adelaide
Party	Candidate	Votes	%	±%
Labor	Jack Wright	7,436	54.5	−11.7
Liberal	Terry McClean	4,506	33.0	−0.8
Democrats	Reginald Goldsworthy	1,540	11.3	+11.3
Australia	Howard Houck	169	1.2	+1.2
Total formal votes		13,651	93.4	−2.7
Informal votes		962	6.6	+2.7
Turnout		14,613	89.7	−0.4
Two-party-preferred result
Labor	Jack Wright	8,291	60.7	−5.5
Liberal	Terry McClean	5,360	39.3	+5.5
Labor hold		Swing	−5.5	

=== Albert Park ===
1979 South Australian state election: Albert Park
Party	Candidate	Votes	%	±%
Labor	Kevin Hamilton	7,901	49.6	−14.5
Liberal	Hans Ehmann	6,507	40.8	+4.9
Democrats	Rosalyn Lawson	1,527	9.6	+9.6
Total formal votes		19,935	94.2	−2.0
Informal votes		980	5.8	+2.0
Turnout		16,915	93.4	−1.2
Two-party-preferred result
Labor	Kevin Hamilton	8,589	53.9	−10.2
Liberal	Hans Ehmann	7,346	46.1	+10.2
Labor hold		Swing	−10.2	

=== Alexandra ===
1979 South Australian state election: Alexandra
Party	Candidate	Votes	%	±%
Liberal	Ted Chapman	11,584	69.7	+8.2
Labor	Helen McSkimming	3,614	21.7	−4.4
Democrats	Kaye Gibbs	1,434	8.6	−3.8
Total formal votes		16,632	96.8	−1.4
Informal votes		547	3.2	+1.4
Two-party-preferred result
Liberal	Ted Chapman	12,301	74.0	+6.3
Labor	Helen McSkimming	4,331	26.0	−6.3
Liberal hold		Swing	+6.3	

=== Ascot Park ===
1979 South Australian state election: Ascot Park
Party	Candidate	Votes	%	±%
Labor	John Trainer	7,066	48.0	−11.2
Liberal	Frank Chapman	6,116	41.5	+12.4
Democrats	Kenneth Johnson	1,549	10.5	−1.2
Total formal votes		14,731	95.7	−2.4
Informal votes		656	4.3	+2.4
Turnout		15,387	93.6	−0.7
Two-party-preferred result
Labor	John Trainer	7,609	51.7	−12.1
Liberal	Frank Chapman	7,122	48.3	+12.1
Labor hold		Swing	−12.1	

=== Baudin ===
1979 South Australian state election: Baudin
Party	Candidate	Votes	%	±%
Labor	Don Hopgood	8,918	48.2	−18.5
Liberal	Thomas Mitchell	7,083	38.2	+4.9
Democrats	Paul Dawe	2,520	13.6	+13.6
Total formal votes		18,521	95.0	−1.0
Informal votes		969	5.0	+1.0
Turnout		19,490	92.4	−1.3
Two-party-preferred result
Labor	Don Hopgood	10,321	55.7	−11.0
Liberal	Thomas Mitchell	8,200	44.3	+11.0
Labor hold		Swing	−11.0	

=== Bragg ===
1979 South Australian state election: Bragg
Party	Candidate	Votes	%	±%
Liberal	David Tonkin	9,784	66.0	+0.7
Labor	Carolyn Latta	3,408	23.0	−11.7
Democrats	Guy Harley	1,637	11.0	+11.0
Total formal votes		14,830	96.4	−1.2
Informal votes		547	3.6	+1.2
Turnout		15,377	92.0	+0.4
Two-party-preferred result
Liberal	David Tonkin	10,603	71.5	+6.2
Labor	Carolyn Latta	4,227	28.5	−6.2
Liberal hold		Swing	+6.2	

=== Brighton ===
1979 South Australian state election: Brighton
Party	Candidate	Votes	%	±%
Liberal	Dick Glazbrook	8,195	48.7	+14.4
Labor	Hugh Hudson	6,908	41.0	−11.6
Democrats	Ronald Moulds	1,731	10.3	−2.8
Total formal votes		16,834	96.6	−1.9
Informal votes		600	3.4	+1.9
Turnout		17,434	93.5	−1.2
Two-party-preferred result
Liberal	Dick Glazbrook	9,209	54.7	+12.5
Labor	Hugh Hudson	7,625	45.3	−12.5
Liberal gain from Labor		Swing	+12.5	

=== Chaffey ===
1979 South Australian state election: Chaffey
Party	Candidate	Votes	%	±%
Liberal	Peter Arnold	9,970	61.1	+1.5
Labor	Roland Telfer	5,455	33.5	−6.9
Democrats	Rowland Beech	876	5.4	+5.4
Total formal votes		16,301	95.6	−1.9
Informal votes		748	4.4	+1.9
Turnout		17,049	94.3	+0.9
Two-party-preferred result
Liberal	Peter Arnold	10,408	63.8	+4.2
Labor	Roland Telfer	5,893	36.2	−4.2
Liberal hold		Swing	+4.2	

=== Coles ===
1979 South Australian state election: Coles
Party	Candidate	Votes	%	±%
Liberal	Jennifer Adamson	9,502	57.8	+6.4
Labor	Andrew Cunningham	5,566	33.9	−14.7
Democrats	Jennifer Hill	1,127	6.9	+6.9
Independent	Jim Bourne	248	1.5	+1.5
Total formal votes		16,443	95.9	−1.3
Informal votes		705	4.1	+1.3
Turnout		17,148	93.1	−1.3
Two-party-preferred result
Liberal	Jennifer Adamson	10,195	62.0	+10.6
Labor	Andrew Cunningham	6,248	38.0	−10.6
Liberal hold		Swing	+10.6	

=== Davenport ===
1979 South Australian state election: Davenport
Party	Candidate	Votes	%	±%
Liberal	Dean Brown	12,253	75.0	+10.5
Labor	David Cox	2,548	15.6	−4.6
Democrats	John Phillips	1,533	9.4	−3.8
Total formal votes		16,334	98.0	−0.8
Informal votes		325	2.0	+0.8
Turnout		16,659	92.6	−0.3
Two-party-preferred result
Liberal	Dean Brown	13,020	79.7	+7.5
Labor	David Cox	3,314	20.3	−7.5
Liberal hold		Swing	+7.5	

=== Elizabeth ===
1979 South Australian state election: Elizabeth
Party	Candidate	Votes	%	±%
Labor	Peter Duncan	8,809	54.7	−17.7
Liberal	Dick Pratt	5,284	32.8	+5.2
Democrats	Colin Nieass	2,021	12.5	+12.5
Total formal votes		16,114	94.1	−0.6
Informal votes		1,012	5.9	+0.6
Turnout		17,126	92.2	−0.2
Two-party-preferred result
Labor	Peter Duncan	9,820	60.9	−11.5
Liberal	Dick Pratt	6,294	39.1	+11.5
Labor hold		Swing	−11.5	

=== Eyre ===
1979 South Australian state election: Eyre
Party	Candidate	Votes	%	±%
Liberal	Graham Gunn	7,856	59.9	+6.4
Labor	Barry Piltz	5,250	40.1	+17.0
Total formal votes		13,106	96.1	−1.8
Informal votes		538	3.9	+1.8
Turnout		13,644	89.1	+0.3
Liberal hold		Swing	+6.4	

=== Fisher ===
1979 South Australian state election: Fisher
Party	Candidate	Votes	%	±%
Liberal	Stan Evans	11,886	62.5	+2.1
Labor	Alvan Roman	4,783	25.1	−14.5
Democrats	Robert Hercus	2,350	12.4	+12.4
Total formal votes		19,019	97.6	+0.1
Informal votes		465	2.4	−0.1
Turnout		19,484	94.3	+0.7
Two-party-preferred result
Liberal	Stan Evans	13,061	68.7	+8.3
Labor	Alvan Roman	5,958	31.3	−8.3
Liberal hold		Swing	+8.3	

=== Flinders ===
1979 South Australian state election: Flinders
Party	Candidate	Votes	%	±%
National	Peter Blacker	7,833	53.9	+2.4
Liberal	Brian Fitzgerald	3,931	27.0	+3.5
Labor	Terrence Krieg	2,784	19.1	−5.9
Total formal votes		14,548	97.3	−1.4
Informal votes		403	2.7	+1.4
Turnout		14,951	93.8	−1.4
Two-candidate-preferred result
National	Peter Blacker	10,199	70.1	−1.4
Liberal	Brian Fitzgerald	4,349	29.9	+29.9
National hold		Swing	N/A	

=== Florey ===
1979 South Australian state election: Florey
Party	Candidate	Votes	%	±%
Labor	Harold O'Neill	7,679	49.1	−17.9
Liberal	Lois Bell	6,060	38.8	+5.8
Democrats	Shylie Gilfillan	1,885	12.1	+12.1
Total formal votes		15,624	94.4	−2.2
Informal votes		928	5.6	+2.2
Turnout		16,552	93.2	−0.1
Two-party-preferred result
Labor	Harold O'Neill	8,386	53.7	−12.3
Liberal	Lois Bell	7,238	46.3	+12.3
Labor hold		Swing	−12.3	

=== Gilles ===
1979 South Australian state election: Gilles
Party	Candidate	Votes	%	±%
Labor	Jack Slater	7,489	48.3	−9.8
Liberal	Jodi Tabalotny	6,005	38.7	+8.2
Democrats	Eileen Farmer	2,010	13.0	+1.6
Total formal votes		15,504	94.7	−3.2
Informal votes		872	5.3	+3.2
Turnout		16,376	93.6	−0.1
Two-party-preferred result
Labor	Jack Slater	8,589	55.4	−7.2
Liberal	Jodi Tabalotny	6,915	44.6	+7.2
Labor hold		Swing	−7.2	

=== Glenelg ===
1979 South Australian state election: Glenelg
Party	Candidate	Votes	%	±%
Liberal	John Mathwin	9,527	62.7	+3.2
Labor	Maurice Hearn	4,369	28.7	−11.8
Democrats	Diana Harte	1,302	8.6	+8.6
Total formal votes		15,198	96.8	−0.9
Informal votes		499	3.2	+0.9
Turnout		15,697	92.0	−0.8
Two-party-preferred result
Liberal	John Mathwin	10,218	67.2	+7.7
Labor	Maurice Hearn	4,980	32.8	−7.7
Liberal hold		Swing	+7.7	

=== Goyder ===
1979 South Australian state election: Goyder
Party	Candidate	Votes	%	±%
Liberal	Keith Russack	11,772	77.1	+38.3
Labor	Roger Thomas	3,495	22.9	−0.6
Total formal votes		15,267	96.1	−2.5
Informal votes		621	3.9	+2.5
Turnout		15,888	94.1	−0.6
Liberal gain from Independent Liberal		Swing	N/A	

=== Hanson ===
1979 South Australian state election: Hanson
Party	Candidate	Votes	%	±%
Liberal	Heini Becker	9,459	60.8	+5.4
Labor	Peter Rowe	5,194	33.3	−11.3
Democrats	Stanley Gilbie	916	5.9	+5.9
Total formal votes		15,569	96.4	−0.6
Informal votes		578	3.6	+0.6
Turnout		16,147	92.9	0.0
Two-party-preferred result
Liberal	Heini Becker	10,044	64.5	+9.0
Labor	Peter Rowe	5,525	35.5	−9.0
Liberal hold		Swing	+9.0	

=== Hartley ===
1979 South Australian state election: Hartley
Party	Candidate	Votes	%	±%
Labor	Des Corcoran	8,253	50.7	−7.8
Liberal	David Parish	6,669	41.0	+3.8
Democrats	Geoffrey Brown	1,351	8.3	+8.3
Total formal votes		16,273	94.2	−2.6
Informal votes		1,005	5.8	+2.6
Turnout		17,278	93.4	−2.6
Two-party-preferred result
Labor	Des Corcoran	8,959	55.1	−5.3
Liberal	David Parish	7,314	44.9	+5.3
Labor hold		Swing	−5.3	

=== Henley Beach ===
1979 South Australian state election: Henley Beach
Party	Candidate	Votes	%	±%
Liberal	Bob Randall	7,244	44.5	+3.8
Labor	Don Ferguson	7,143	43.9	−15.4
Democrats	Kenneth Maguire	1,878	11.6	+11.6
Total formal votes		16,265	95.0	−1.5
Informal votes		862	5.0	+1.5
Turnout		17,127	93.0	−1.0
Two-party-preferred result
Liberal	Bob Randall	8,289	51.0	+10.3
Labor	Don Ferguson	7,976	49.0	−10.3
Liberal gain from Labor		Swing	+10.3	

=== Kavel ===
1979 South Australian state election: Kavel
Party	Candidate	Votes	%	±%
Liberal	Roger Goldsworthy	11,248	68.8	+5.0
Labor	Sydney Tilmouth	3,626	22.2	−6.3
Democrats	Ivor Childs	1,464	9.0	+1.3
Total formal votes		16,338	97.2	−1.0
Informal votes		476	2.8	+1.0
Turnout		16,814	93.8	−0.6
Two-party-preferred result
Liberal	Roger Goldsworthy	12,143	74.3	+5.6
Labor	Sydney Tilmouth	4,195	25.7	−5.6
Liberal hold		Swing	+5.6	

=== Light ===
1979 South Australian state election: Light
Party	Candidate	Votes	%	±%
Liberal	Bruce Eastick	9,412	63.6	+2.9
Labor	William Young	4,392	29.7	−9.6
Democrats	Barrie Tornquist	999	6.7	+6.7
Total formal votes		14,803	96.6	−1.0
Informal votes		520	3.4	+1.0
Turnout		15,323	94.3	+0.6
Two-party-preferred result
Liberal	Bruce Eastick	9,947	67.2	+6.5
Labor	William Young	4,856	32.8	−6.5
Liberal hold		Swing	+6.5	

=== Mallee ===
1979 South Australian state election: Mallee
Party	Candidate	Votes	%	±%
Liberal	Peter Lewis	6,488	45.9	−14.6
National	Guy Wheal	3,541	25.0	+8.8
Labor	Dale Thiel	2,526	17.9	+1.7
Independent	Ronald Hentschke	1,583	11.2	+11.2
Total formal votes		14,138	97.2	−0.9
Informal votes		414	2.8	+0.9
Turnout		14,552	93.6	−0.8
Two-candidate-preferred result
Liberal	Peter Lewis	8,134	57.3	−16.5
National	Guy Wheal	6,004	42.7	+42.7
Liberal hold		Swing	N/A	

=== Mawson ===
1979 South Australian state election: Mawson
Party	Candidate	Votes	%	±%
Liberal	Ivar Schmidt	9,225	47.1	+9.5
Labor	Leslie Drury	8,082	41.3	−10.5
Democrats	Jay McMerrick	2,278	11.6	+1.0
Total formal votes		19,585	96.3	−2.1
Informal votes		749	3.7	+2.1
Turnout		20,334	94.7	−1.0
Two-party-preferred result
Liberal	Ivar Schmidt	10,384	53.0	+9.5
Labor	Leslie Drury	9,201	47.0	−9.5
Liberal gain from Labor		Swing	+9.5	

=== Mitcham ===
1979 South Australian state election: Mitcham
Party	Candidate	Votes	%	±%
Democrats	Robin Millhouse	6,947	45.1	+12.8
Liberal	Robert Worth	5,750	37.3	−4.5
Labor	Rosemary Crowley	2,671	17.3	−8.6
Australia	Ian Modistach	41	0.3	+0.3
Total formal votes		15,409	98.1	−0.9
Informal votes		290	1.9	+0.9
Turnout		15,699	93.5	+0.5
Two-candidate-preferred result
Democrats	Robin Millhouse	8,426	54.7	−1.8
Liberal	Robert Worth	6,983	45.3	+1.8
Democrats hold		Swing	−1.8	

=== Mitchell ===
1979 South Australian state election: Mitchell
Party	Candidate	Votes	%	±%
Labor	Ron Payne	7,624	49.8	−6.3
Liberal	Thomas Wallace	5,975	39.0	+7.4
Democrats	Kevin Whitby	1,721	11.2	+1.4
Total formal votes		15,320	96.2	−1.6
Informal votes		610	3.8	+1.6
Turnout		15,930	93.3	−0.2
Two-party-preferred result
Labor	Ron Payne	8,321	54.3	−7.1
Liberal	Thomas Wallace	6,999	45.7	+7.1
Labor hold		Swing	−7.1	

=== Morphett ===
1979 South Australian state election: Morphett
Party	Candidate	Votes	%	±%
Liberal	John Oswald	7,959	51.8	+7.8
Labor	Terry Groom	6,497	42.3	−5.2
Democrats	Elizabeth Topperwien	910	5.9	−2.6
Total formal votes		15,366	96.7	−1.3
Informal votes		525	3.3	+1.3
Turnout		15,891	93.7	+0.5
Two-party-preferred result
Liberal	John Oswald	8,499	55.3	+5.7
Labor	Terry Groom	6,867	44.7	−5.7
Liberal gain from Labor		Swing	+5.7	

=== Mount Gambier ===
1979 South Australian state election: Mount Gambier
Party	Candidate	Votes	%	±%
Liberal	Harold Allison	8,983	55.6	+4.2
Labor	Graham Bath	7,162	44.4	−4.2
Total formal votes		16,145	97.3	−0.8
Informal votes		452	2.7	+0.8
Turnout		16,597	93.8	−1.1
Liberal hold		Swing	+4.2	

=== Murray ===
1979 South Australian state election: Murray
Party	Candidate	Votes	%	±%
Liberal	David Wotton	10,180	62.8	+30.8
Labor	Jack Pitcher	5,137	31.7	−4.2
Democrats	Gerhard Weissmann	900	5.5	+5.5
Total formal votes		16,217	96.2	−1.9
Informal votes		634	3.8	+1.9
Turnout		16,851	93.5	−0.4
Two-party-preferred result
Liberal	David Wotton	10,693	65.9	+5.9
Labor	Jack Pitcher	5,524	34.1	−5.9
Liberal hold		Swing	+5.9	

=== Napier ===
1979 South Australian state election: Napier
Party	Candidate	Votes	%	±%
Labor	Terry Hemmings	7,940	52.6	−18.4
Liberal	Eric Bates	4,682	31.0	+2.0
Democrats	John Ferguson	2,465	16.3	+16.3
Total formal votes		15,087	93.4	−1.8
Informal votes		1,058	6.6	+1.8
Turnout		16,145	91.0	−0.6
Two-party-preferred result
Labor	Terry Hemmings	8,976	59.5	−11.5
Liberal	Eric Bates	6,111	40.5	+11.5
Labor hold		Swing	−11.5	

=== Newland ===
1979 South Australian state election: Newland
Party	Candidate	Votes	%	±%
Liberal	Brian Billard	9,661	50.3	+17.4
Labor	John Klunder	7,345	38.3	−15.4
Democrats	Stephen Farrelly	2,192	11.4	−2.0
Total formal votes		19,198	95.6	−2.3
Informal votes		880	4.0	+2.3
Turnout		20,078	93.8	−0.4
Two-party-preferred result
Liberal	Brian Billard	10,765	55.9	+15.7
Labor	John Klunder	8,433	43.8	−15.7
Liberal gain from Labor		Swing	+15.7	

=== Norwood ===
1979 South Australian state election: Norwood
Party	Candidate	Votes	%	±%
Labor	Greg Crafter	6,921	47.0	−13.2
Liberal	Frank Webster	6,899	46.9	+7.1
Democrats	Jeffrey Heath	893	6.1	+6.1
Total formal votes		14,713	95.6	−1.2
Informal votes		678	4.4	+1.2
Turnout		15,391	92.3	+1.8
Two-party-preferred result
Liberal	Frank Webster	7,373	50.1	+10.3
Labor	Greg Crafter	7,340	49.9	−10.3
Liberal gain from Labor		Swing	+10.3	

- One of the seats lost to the Liberals had been Don Dunstan's old seat of Norwood. However, in 1980, a court overturned Liberal Frank Webster's victory, triggering a by-election. Greg Crafter regained the seat for Labor, reducing the Liberal government to 24 seats, a one-seat majority.

=== Peake ===
1979 South Australian state election: Peake
Party	Candidate	Votes	%	±%
Labor	Keith Plunkett	8,319	57.8	−9.6
Liberal	Marko Milosevic	6,066	42.2	+9.6
Total formal votes		14,385	93.6	−3.2
Informal votes		982	6.4	+3.2
Turnout		15,367	93.2	+2.7
Labor hold		Swing	−9.6	

=== Playford ===
1979 South Australian state election: Playford
Party	Candidate	Votes	%	±%
Labor	Terry McRae	7,524	46.9	−13.7
Liberal	Neville Mitchell	5,835	36.3	+11.8
Democrats	John Longhurst	2,691	16.8	+3.1
Total formal votes		16,050	93.7	−3.4
Informal votes		1,077	6.3	+3.4
Turnout		17,127	93.4	−0.5
Two-party-preferred result
Labor	Terry McRae	8,639	55.1	−10.0
Liberal	Neville Mitchell	7,211	44.9	+10.0
Labor hold		Swing	−10.0	

=== Price ===
1979 South Australian state election: Price
Party	Candidate	Votes	%	±%
Labor	George Whitten	7,694	56.4	−13.0
Liberal	David Beames	4,448	32.6	+2.0
Democrats	Robert Manhire	1,507	11.0	+11.0
Total formal votes		13,649	92.6	−3.0
Informal votes		1,092	7.4	+3.0
Turnout		14,741	92.8	−0.4
Two-party-preferred result
Labor	George Whitten	8,262	60.5	−8.9
Liberal	David Beames	5,387	39.5	+8.9
Labor hold		Swing	−8.9	

=== Rocky River ===
1979 South Australian state election: Rocky River
Party	Candidate	Votes	%	±%
Liberal	John Olsen	7,672	49.1	−8.9
Labor	Denis Crisp	5,299	34.0	−4.8
National Country	Helen Tiller	2,639	16.9	+4.9
Total formal votes		15,610	96.7	−1.9
Informal votes		525	3.3	+1.9
Turnout		16,135	94.5	−0.9
Two-party-preferred result
Liberal	John Olsen	9,849	63.1	+4.9
Labor	Denis Crisp	5,761	36.9	−4.9
Liberal hold		Swing	+4.9	

=== Ross Smith ===
1979 South Australian state election: Ross Smith
Party	Candidate	Votes	%	±%
Labor	John Bannon	8,997	64.6	−7.6
Liberal	Ruth Squire	3,746	26.9	−0.9
Democrats	Margaret-Ann Williams	1,179	8.5	+8.5
Total formal votes		13,922	93.5	−2.7
Informal votes		961	6.5	+2.7
Turnout		14,883	92.8	−1.4
Two-party-preferred result
Labor	John Bannon	9,522	68.4	−3.8
Liberal	Ruth Squire	4,400	31.6	+3.8
Labor hold		Swing	−3.8	

=== Salisbury ===
1979 South Australian state election: Salisbury
Party	Candidate	Votes	%	±%
Labor	Lynn Arnold	10,840	60.8	−8.7
Liberal	Derrick Rich	6,996	39.2	+8.7
Total formal votes		17,836	93.0	−2.0
Informal votes		1,336	7.0	+2.0
Turnout		19,172	93.3	+0.1
Labor hold		Swing	−8.7	

=== Semaphore ===
1979 South Australian state election: Semaphore
Party	Candidate	Votes	%	±%
Labor	George Apap	5,778	35.9	−34.9
Independent Labor	Norm Peterson	5,106	31.7	+31.7
Liberal	Mac Lawrie	4,500	28.0	+0.9
Democrats	Dean Richards	715	4.4	+4.4
Total formal votes		16,099	94.4	−2.7
Informal votes		957	5.6	+2.7
Turnout		17,056	94.6	+1.4
Two-candidate-preferred result
Independent Labor	Norm Peterson	10,022	62.2	+62.2
Labor	George Apap	6,077	37.8	−34.4
Independent Labor gain from Labor		Swing	N/A	

=== Spence ===
1979 South Australian state election: Spence
Party	Candidate	Votes	%	±%
Labor	Roy Abbott	9,502	70.2	−7.1
Liberal	Barry Lewis	4,027	29.8	+7.1
Total formal votes		13,529	93.6	−2.1
Informal votes		932	6.4	+2.1
Turnout		14,461	92.8	−0.3
Labor hold		Swing	−7.1	

=== Stuart ===
1979 South Australian state election: Stuart
Party	Candidate	Votes	%	±%
Labor	Gavin Keneally	10,236	67.0	−6.9
Liberal	Sydney Cheesman	5,054	33.0	+6.9
Total formal votes		15,290	95.3	−1.3
Informal votes		760	4.7	+1.3
Turnout		16,050	94.2	+0.2
Labor hold		Swing	−6.9	

=== Todd ===
1979 South Australian state election: Todd
Party	Candidate	Votes	%	±%
Liberal	Scott Ashenden	8,478	49.8	+6.3
Labor	Molly Byrne	6,935	40.8	−15.7
Democrats	Michael Reglar	1,595	9.4	+9.4
Total formal votes		17,008	96.0	−1.6
Informal votes		711	4.0	+1.6
Turnout		17,719	94.0	−1.0
Two-party-preferred result
Liberal	Scott Ashenden	9,287	54.6	+11.1
Labor	Molly Byrne	7,721	45.4	−11.1
Liberal gain from Labor		Swing	+11.1	

=== Torrens ===
1979 South Australian state election: Torrens
Party	Candidate	Votes	%	±%
Liberal	Michael Wilson	8,186	56.0	+5.5
Labor	Ralph Clarke	5,113	35.0	−11.2
Democrats	Stuart Brasted	1,313	9.0	+9.0
Total formal votes		14,612	96.4	−1.3
Informal votes		548	3.6	+1.3
Turnout		15,160	89.8	−0.5
Two-party-preferred result
Liberal	Michael Wilson	8,777	60.1	+7.6
Labor	Ralph Clarke	5,835	39.9	−7.6
Liberal hold		Swing	+7.6	

=== Unley ===
1979 South Australian state election: Unley
Party	Candidate	Votes	%	±%
Labor	Gil Langley	6,425	47.1	−11.8
Liberal	Robert Nicholls	5,908	43.4	+5.4
Democrats	Albert Apponyi	1,293	9.5	+9.5
Total formal votes		13,626	95.2	−2.3
Informal votes		694	4.8	+2.3
Turnout		14,320	90.1	−0.1
Two-party-preferred result
Labor	Gil Langley	7,119	52.3	−7.8
Liberal	Robert Nicholls	6,503	47.7	+7.8
Labor hold		Swing	−7.8	

=== Victoria ===
1979 South Australian state election: Victoria
Party	Candidate	Votes	%	±%
Liberal	Allan Rodda	9,476	68.0	+2.7
Labor	Terry Roberts	4,451	32.0	−2.7
Total formal votes		13,927	95.9	−2.0
Informal votes		596	4.1	+2.0
Turnout		14,523	93.3	−0.5
Liberal hold		Swing	+2.7	

=== Whyalla ===
1979 South Australian state election: Whyalla
Party	Candidate	Votes	%	±%
Labor	Max Brown	9,173	63.7	−9.5
Liberal	Vivienne Cruickshank	4,296	29.8	+3.0
Democrats	Ella Smith	719	5.0	+5.0
Independent	David Sims	217	1.5	+1.5
Total formal votes		14,405	94.5	−1.6
Informal votes		835	5.5	+1.6
Turnout		15,240	91.8	−1.9
Two-party-preferred result
Labor	Max Brown	9,607	66.7	−6.5
Liberal	Vivienne Cruickshank	4,798	33.3	+6.5
Labor hold		Swing	−6.5	

== See also ==
- Candidates of the 1979 South Australian state election
- Members of the South Australian House of Assembly, 1979–1982
