= Electoral results for the district of Norwood =

South Australian district election results

This is a list of electoral results for the Electoral district of Norwood in South Australian state elections.

== Members for Norwood ==
Member	Party	Term
Frank Nieass	Labor Party	1938–1941
Roy Moir	Liberal and Country League	1941–1944
Frank Nieass	Labor Party	1944–1947
Roy Moir	Liberal and Country League	1947–1953
Don Dunstan	Labor Party	1953–1979
Greg Crafter	Labor Party	1979–1979
Frank Webster	Liberal Party	1979–1980
Greg Crafter	Labor Party	1980–1993
John Cummins	Liberal Party	1993–1997
Vini Ciccarello	Labor Party	1997–2010
Steven Marshall	Liberal Party	2010–2014

== Election results ==
=== Elections in the 2010s ===
2010 South Australian state election: Norwood
Party	Candidate	Votes	%	±%
Liberal	Steven Marshall	9,844	46.3	+5.7
Labor	Vini Ciccarello	7,184	33.8	−8.1
Greens	Katie McCusker	2,498	11.8	+3.0
Save the RAH	Philip Harding	489	2.3	+2.3
Family First	Paul Theofanous	413	1.9	−0.7
Dignity for Disability	Rick Neagle	392	1.8	+0.5
Gamers 4 Croydon	David Egge	258	1.2	+1.2
Fair Land Tax	Pamela Anders	177	0.8	+0.8
Total formal votes		21,255	96.4	
Informal votes		746	3.6	
Turnout		22,001	91.7	
Two-party-preferred result
Liberal	Steven Marshall	11,667	54.9	+8.8
Labor	Vini Ciccarello	9,588	45.1	−8.8
Liberal gain from Labor		Swing	+8.8	

=== Elections in the 2000s ===
2006 South Australian state election: Norwood
Party	Candidate	Votes	%	±%
Labor	Vini Ciccarello	8,389	42.4	+3.6
Liberal	Nigel Smart	8,010	40.5	−1.4
Greens	Cate Mussared	1,679	8.5	+2.5
Democrats	David Winderlich	545	2.8	−5.2
Family First	Roger Andrews	508	2.6	−0.2
Independent	Patrick Larkin	380	1.9	+1.9
Dignity for Disabled	Rick Neagle	274	1.4	+1.4
Total formal votes		19,785	96.6	−0.4
Informal votes		699	3.4	+0.4
Turnout		20,484	91.6	−0.4
Two-party-preferred result
Labor	Vini Ciccarello	10,723	54.2	+3.7
Liberal	Nigel Smart	9,062	45.8	−3.7
Labor hold		Swing	+3.7	

2002 South Australian state election: Norwood
Party	Candidate	Votes	%	±%
Liberal	Michael Durrant	8,633	41.9	+0.4
Labor	Vini Ciccarello	7,986	38.8	−0.9
Democrats	Adele Eliseo	1,654	8.0	−4.9
Greens	Mark Cullen	1,244	6.0	+2.1
Family First	Geraldine Bennett	575	2.8	+2.8
SA First	Darryl Tuppen	283	1.4	+1.4
One Nation	Thorpe Chambers	220	1.1	+1.1
Total formal votes		20,595	97.0	
Informal votes		639	3.0	
Turnout		21,234	92.0	
Two-party-preferred result
Labor	Vini Ciccarello	10,392	50.5	−1.0
Liberal	Michael Durrant	10,203	49.5	+1.0
Labor hold		Swing	−1.0	

=== Elections in the 1990s ===
1997 South Australian state election: Norwood
Party	Candidate	Votes	%	±%
Liberal	John Cummins	7,732	42.5	−8.6
Labor	Vini Ciccarello	7,128	39.2	+5.4
Democrats	Keith Oehme	2,215	12.2	−0.2
Greens	Michelle Drummond	796	4.4	+4.4
United Australia	Kevin Duffy	316	1.7	+1.7
Total formal votes		18,187	95.9	−1.1
Informal votes		775	4.1	+1.1
Turnout		18,962	89.4	
Two-party-preferred result
Labor	Vini Ciccarello	9,244	50.8	+8.2
Liberal	John Cummins	8,943	49.2	−8.2
Labor gain from Liberal		Swing	+8.2	

1993 South Australian state election: Norwood
Party	Candidate	Votes	%	±%
Liberal	John Cummins	9,669	51.1	+9.7
Labor	Greg Crafter	6,412	33.9	−10.8
Democrats	Ian Gilfillan	2,337	12.4	+0.3
Natural Law	Vladimir Lorenzon	493	2.6	+2.6
Total formal votes		18,911	97.0	0.0
Informal votes		576	3.0	0.0
Turnout		19,487	91.7	
Two-party-preferred result
Liberal	John Cummins	10,848	57.4	+10.4
Labor	Greg Crafter	8,063	42.6	−10.4
Liberal gain from Labor		Swing	+10.4	

=== Elections in the 1980s ===
1989 South Australian state election: Norwood
Party	Candidate	Votes	%	±%
Labor	Greg Crafter	7,502	44.3	−8.9
Liberal	Robert Jackson	7,169	42.4	+0.6
Democrats	Catherine Tucker-Lee	1,818	10.7	+5.7
Call to Australia	Belle Harris	247	1.5	+1.5
Independent	Alison Cox	194	1.1	+1.1
Total formal votes		16,930	96.8	−0.5
Informal votes		556	3.2	+0.5
Turnout		17,486	93.2	+0.8
Two-party-preferred result
Labor	Greg Crafter	8,887	52.5	−3.8
Liberal	Robert Jackson	8,043	47.5	+3.8
Labor hold		Swing	−3.8	

1985 South Australian state election: Norwood
Party	Candidate	Votes	%	±%
Labor	Greg Crafter	8,990	53.2	+0.2
Liberal	Sue Graham	7,074	41.8	+0.8
Democrats	Rodney Roberts	848	5.0	−1.0
Total formal votes		16,912	97.3	
Informal votes		479	2.7	
Turnout		17,391	92.4	
Two-party-preferred result
Labor	Greg Crafter	9,526	56.3	+0.3
Liberal	Sue Graham	7,386	43.7	−0.3
Labor hold		Swing	+0.3	

1982 South Australian state election: Norwood
Party	Candidate	Votes	%	±%
Labor	Greg Crafter	8,510	56.1	+9.1
Liberal	Lynton Crosby	5,756	38.0	−8.9
Democrats	Josephine Read	898	5.9	−0.2
Total formal votes		15,164	94.7	−0.9
Informal votes		844	5.3	+0.9
Turnout		16,008	90.3	−2.0
Two-party-preferred result
Labor	Greg Crafter	8,963	59.1	+9.2
Liberal	Lynton Crosby	6,201	40.9	−9.2
Labor gain from Liberal		Swing	+9.2	

1980 Norwood state by-election
Party	Candidate	Votes	%	±%
Labor	G J Crafter	7,390	48.8	+1.8
Liberal	F R Webster	6,713	44.4	−2.5
Democrats	D J D'Angelo	682	4.5	−1.6
Marijuana Party	S M Dimitriou	342	2.3	+2.3
Total formal votes		15,127	97.7	N/A
Informal votes		354	2.3	N/A
Turnout		15,481	88.8	N/A
Two-party-preferred result
Labor	G J Crafter	8,026	53.1	+3.2
Liberal	F R Webster	7,101	46.9	−3.2
Labor gain from Liberal		Swing	+3.2	

=== Elections in the 1970s ===
1979 South Australian state election: Norwood
Party	Candidate	Votes	%	±%
Labor	Greg Crafter	6,921	47.0	−13.2
Liberal	Frank Webster	6,899	46.9	+7.1
Democrats	Jeffrey Heath	893	6.1	+6.1
Total formal votes		14,713	95.6	−1.2
Informal votes		678	4.4	+1.2
Turnout		15,391	92.3	+1.8
Two-party-preferred result
Liberal	Frank Webster	7,373	50.1	+10.3
Labor	Greg Crafter	7,340	49.9	−10.3
Liberal gain from Labor		Swing	+10.3	

1979 Norwood state by-election
Party	Candidate	Votes	%	±%
Labor	G J Crafter	6,505	47.3	−12.9
Liberal	F R Webster	5,866	42.7	+2.9
Democrats	L Bullock	761	5.5	+5.5
Marijuana Party	S M Dimitriou	302	2.2	+2.2
Independent	H J Steele	225	1.6	+1.6
Australia Party	I C Modistach	83	0.6	+0.6
Total formal votes		13,742	97.0	N/A
Informal votes		430	3.0	N/A
Turnout		14,172	84.2	N/A
Two-party-preferred result
Labor	G J Crafter	7,314	53.2	−7.0
Liberal	F R Webster	6,428	46.8	+7.0
Labor hold		Swing	−7.0	

1977 South Australian state election: Norwood
Party	Candidate	Votes	%	±%
Labor	Don Dunstan	9,361	60.2	+4.6
Liberal	William Zacharia	6,181	39.8	+8.2
Total formal votes		15,542	96.8	
Informal votes		505	3.2	
Turnout		16,047	90.5	
Labor hold		Swing	+2.7	

1975 South Australian state election: Norwood
Party	Candidate	Votes	%	±%
Labor	Don Dunstan	8,643	55.6	−4.1
Liberal	Barry Briegel	4,912	31.6	−8.7
Liberal Movement	Frank Mercorella	1,980	12.8	+12.8
Total formal votes		15,535	95.1	−1.2
Informal votes		800	4.9	+1.2
Turnout		16,335	90.7	−2.2
Two-party-preferred result
Labor	Don Dunstan	8,839	56.9	−2.8
Liberal	Barry Briegel	6,696	43.1	+2.8
Labor hold		Swing	−2.8	

1973 South Australian state election: Norwood
Party	Candidate	Votes	%	±%
Labor	Don Dunstan	9,033	59.7	+4.1
Liberal and Country	Peter Adamson	6,095	40.3	+1.7
Total formal votes		15,128	96.3	−1.6
Informal votes		583	3.7	+1.6
Turnout		15,711	92.9	−1.2
Labor hold		Swing	+2.5	

1970 South Australian state election: Norwood
Party	Candidate	Votes	%	±%
Labor	Don Dunstan	8,353	55.6	
Liberal and Country	Keith Bowman	5,804	38.6	
Democratic Labor	Kevin Bourne-McRae	546	3.6	
Independent	William Hann	327	2.1	
Total formal votes		15,030	97.9	
Informal votes		325	2.1	
Turnout		15,355	94.1	
Two-party-preferred result
Labor	Don Dunstan	8,598	57.2	
Liberal and Country	Keith Bowman	6,432	42.8	
Labor hold		Swing		

=== Elections in the 1960s ===
1968 South Australian state election: Norwood
Party	Candidate	Votes	%	±%
Labor	Don Dunstan	9,981	56.4	−1.2
Liberal and Country	David Tonkin	7,417	41.9	−0.5
Democratic Labor	Kevin McRae	303	1.7	+1.7
Total formal votes		17,701	97.9	+1.2
Informal votes		388	2.1	−1.2
Turnout		18,089	93.9	+0.5
Two-party-preferred result
Labor	Don Dunstan	10,026	56.6	−1.0
Liberal and Country	David Tonkin	7,675	43.4	+1.0
Labor hold		Swing	−1.0	

1965 South Australian state election: Norwood
Party	Candidate	Votes	%	±%
Labor	Don Dunstan	10,452	57.6	−0.5
Liberal and Country	Sidney Daws	7,679	42.4	+5.2
Total formal votes		18,131	96.7	−1.4
Informal votes		610	3.3	+1.4
Turnout		18,741	93.4	−0.4
Labor hold		Swing	−1.2	

1962 South Australian state election: Norwood
Party	Candidate	Votes	%	±%
Labor	Don Dunstan	11,315	58.1	+4.0
Liberal and Country	Richard Wegener	7,237	37.2	−2.7
Democratic Labor	Francis Dempsey	920	4.7	−1.3
Total formal votes		19,472	98.1	+0.5
Informal votes		383	1.9	−0.5
Turnout		19,855	93.8	−0.5
Two-party-preferred result
Labor	Don Dunstan	11,453	58.8	+3.8
Liberal and Country	Richard Wegener	8,402	41.2	−3.8
Labor hold		Swing	+3.8	

=== Elections in the 1950s ===
1959 South Australian state election: Norwood
Party	Candidate	Votes	%	±%
Labor	Don Dunstan	10,723	54.1	−2.4
Liberal and Country	Trevor Butcher	7,899	39.9	+0.6
Democratic Labor	Lance Bishop	1,185	6.0	+1.8
Total formal votes		19,807	97.6	−0.8
Informal votes		487	2.4	+0.8
Turnout		20,294	94.3	+0.5
Two-party-preferred result
Labor	Don Dunstan		55.0	−2.2
Liberal and Country	Trevor Butcher		45.0	+2.2
Labor hold		Swing	−2.2	

- Two party preferred vote was estimated.

1956 South Australian state election: Norwood
Party	Candidate	Votes	%	±%
Labor	Don Dunstan	11,981	56.5	
Liberal and Country	Roy Moir	8,323	39.3	
Labor (A-C)	John Parkinson	884	4.2	
Total formal votes		21,188	98.4	
Informal votes		354	1.6	
Turnout		21,532	93.8	
Two-party-preferred result
Labor	Don Dunstan		57.2	
Liberal and Country	Roy Moir		42.8	
Labor hold		Swing		

- Two party preferred vote was estimated.

1953 South Australian state election: Norwood
Party	Candidate	Votes	%	±%
Labor	Don Dunstan	9,189	56.3	+12.4
Liberal and Country	Roy Moir	7,122	43.7	−10.6
Total formal votes		16,311	97.8	+2.9
Informal votes		367	2.2	−2.9
Turnout		16,678	95.1	+1.4
Labor gain from Liberal and Country		Swing	+10.8	

1950 South Australian state election: Norwood
Party	Candidate	Votes	%	±%
Liberal and Country	Roy Moir	9,081	54.3	+2.9
Labor	Edward Souter	7,336	43.9	−4.7
Communist	Alfred Watt	305	1.8	+1.8
Total formal votes		16,722	94.9	−2.4
Informal votes		894	5.1	+2.4
Turnout		17,616	93.7	+0.5
Two-party-preferred result
Liberal and Country	Roy Moir		54.5	+3.1
Labor	Edward Souter		45.5	−3.1
Liberal and Country hold		Swing	+3.1	

- Two party preferred vote was estimated.

=== Elections in the 1940s ===
1947 South Australian state election: Norwood
Party	Candidate	Votes	%	±%
Liberal and Country	Roy Moir	8,839	51.4	+5.0
Labor	Frank Nieass	8,352	48.6	−5.0
Total formal votes		17,191	97.3	+2.0
Informal votes		469	2.7	−2.0
Turnout		17,660	93.2	+4.8
Liberal and Country gain from Labor		Swing	+5.0	

1944 South Australian state election: Norwood
Party	Candidate	Votes	%	±%
Labor	Frank Nieass	8,212	53.6	+6.3
Liberal and Country	Roy Moir	7,095	46.4	−6.3
Total formal votes		15,307	95.3	−2.6
Informal votes		747	4.7	+2.6
Turnout		16,054	88.4	+42.8
Labor gain from Liberal and Country		Swing	+4.3	

1941 South Australian state election: Norwood
Party	Candidate	Votes	%	±%
Labor	Frank Nieass	3,504	47.3	+13.6
Liberal and Country	Roy Moir	3,442	46.5	+17.6
Independent	Raymond Davis	459	6.2	+6.2
Total formal votes		7,405	97.9	+1.3
Informal votes		155	2.1	−1.3
Turnout		7,560	45.6	−11.0
Two-party-preferred result
Liberal and Country	Roy Moir	3,754	50.7	+3.7
Labor	Frank Nieass	3,651	49.3	−3.7
Liberal and Country gain from Labor		Swing	+3.7	

=== Elections in the 1930s ===
1938 South Australian state election: Norwood
Party	Candidate	Votes	%	±%
Labor	Frank Nieass	3,050	33.7	
Liberal and Country	Walter Hamilton	2,614	28.9	
Independent	Millicent Bowering	1,821	20.1	
Independent	Henry Austin	788	8.7	
Independent	William Hardy	785	8.7	
Total formal votes		9,058	96.6	
Informal votes		322	3.4	
Turnout		9,380	56.6	
Two-party-preferred result
Labor	Frank Nieass	4,803	53.0	
Liberal and Country	Walter Hamilton	4,255	47.0	
Labor gain from Liberal and Country		Swing		
