= Members of the South Australian House of Assembly, 1979–1982 =

This is a list of members of the South Australian House of Assembly from 1979 to 1982, as elected at the 1979 state election:

Name	Party	Electorate	Term of office
Roy Abbott	Labor	Spence	1975–1989
Hon Jennifer Adamson	Liberal	Coles	1977–1993
Hon Harold Allison	Liberal	Mount Gambier	1975–1997
Hon Peter Arnold	Liberal	Chaffey	1968–1970, 1973–1993
Lynn Arnold	Labor	Salisbury	1979–1994
Scott Ashenden	Liberal	Todd	1979–1985, 1993–1997
John Bannon	Labor	Ross Smith	1977–1993
Heini Becker	Liberal	Hanson	1970–1997
Dr Brian Billard	Liberal	Newland	1979–1982
Peter Blacker	NCP	Flinders	1973–1993
Dean Brown	Liberal	Davenport	1973–1985, 1992–2006
Max Brown	Labor	Whyalla	1970–1985
Hon Ted Chapman	Liberal	Alexandra	1973–1992
Hon Des Corcoran	Labor	Hartley	1962–1968, 1968–1982
Greg Crafter ^{[1]}	Labor	Norwood	1979, 1980–1993
Hon Peter Duncan	Labor	Elizabeth	1973–1984
Hon Bruce Eastick	Liberal	Light	1970–1993
Stan Evans	Liberal	Fisher	1968–1993
Dick Glazbrook	Liberal	Brighton	1979–1982
Roger Goldsworthy	Liberal	Kavel	1970–1992
Bob Gregory ^{[3]}	Labor	Florey	1982–1993
Graham Gunn	Liberal	Eyre	1970–2010
Terry Hemmings	Labor	Napier	1977–1993
Kevin Hamilton	Labor	Albert Park	1979–1993
Hon Dr Don Hopgood	Labor	Baudin	1970–1993
Gavin Keneally	Labor	Stuart	1970–1989
Gil Langley	Labor	Unley	1962–1982
Peter Lewis	Liberal	Mallee	1979–2006
John Mathwin	Liberal	Glenelg	1970–1985
Terry McRae	Labor	Playford	1970–1989
Robin Millhouse ^{[2]}	Democrat	Mitcham	1955–1982
John Olsen	Liberal	Rocky River	1979–1990, 1992–2002
Harold O'Neill ^{[3]}	Labor	Florey	1979–1982
John Oswald	Liberal	Morphett	1979–2002
Hon Ron Payne	Labor	Mitchell	1970–1989
Norm Peterson	Independent	Semaphore	1979–1993
Keith Plunkett	Labor	Peake	1979–1989
Bob Randall	Liberal	Henley Beach	1979–1982
Allan Rodda	Liberal	Victoria	1965–1985
Keith Russack	Liberal	Goyder	1973–1982
Ivar Schmidt	Liberal	Mawson	1979–1982
Jack Slater	Labor	Gilles	1970–1989
Heather Southcott ^{[2]}	Democrat	Mitcham	1982
Hon Dr David Tonkin	Liberal	Bragg	1970–1983
John Trainer	Labor	Ascot Park	1979–1993
Frank Webster ^{[1]}	Liberal	Norwood	1979–1980
George Whitten	Labor	Price	1975–1985
Michael Wilson	Liberal	Torrens	1977–1985
Hon David Wotton	Liberal	Murray	1975–2002
Hon Jack Wright	Labor	Adelaide	1971–1985

^{1} The election of the Liberal member for Norwood, Frank Webster was overturned by the Court of Disputed Returns on 22 January 1980. Labor candidate and former member Greg Crafter won the resulting by-election on 16 February 1980.
^{2} The Democrat member for Mitcham, Robin Millhouse, resigned on 7 April 1982 on his appointment to the Supreme Court of South Australia. Democrat candidate Heather Southcott won the resulting by-election on 8 May 1982.
^{3} The Labor member for Florey, Harold O'Neill, resigned on 11 August 1982. Labor candidate Bob Gregory won the resulting by-election on 4 September 1982.
