= Candidates of the 1979 South Australian state election =

The 1979 South Australian state election was held on 15 September 1979.

== Retiring Members ==
=== Labor ===
- Glen Broomhill MHA (Henley Beach)
- Reg Groth MHA (Salisbury)
- Charles Harrison MHA (Albert Park)
- Jack Olson MHA (Semaphore)
- Don Simmons MHA (Peake)
- Geoff Virgo MHA (Ascot Park)
- Charles Wells MHA (Florey)
- Don Banfield MLC
- Tom Casey MLC

=== Liberal ===
- Howard Venning MHA (Rocky River)
- Jessie Cooper MLC
- Richard Geddes MLC

== House of Assembly ==
Sitting members are shown in bold text. Successful candidates are highlighted in the relevant colour. Where there is possible confusion, an asterisk (*) is also used.

Electorate	Held by	Labor candidate	Liberal candidate	Democrats candidate	Other candidates
Adelaide	Labor	**Jack Wright**	Terry McClean	Reginald Goldsworthy	Howard Houck (AP)
Albert Park	Labor	Kevin Hamilton	Hans Ehmann	Rosalyn Lawson	
Alexandra	Liberal	Helen McSkimming	**Ted Chapman**	Kaye Gibbs	
Ascot Park	Labor	John Trainer	Frank Chapman	Kenneth Johnson	
Baudin	Labor	**Don Hopgood**	Thomas Mitchell	Paul Dawe	
Bragg	Liberal	Carolyn Latta	**David Tonkin**	Guy Harley	
Brighton	Labor	**Hugh Hudson**	Dick Glazbrook	Ronald Moulds	
Chaffey	Liberal	Roland Telfer	**Peter Arnold**	Rowland Beech	
Coles	Liberal	Andrew Cunningham	**Jennifer Adamson**	Jennifer Hill	Jim Bourne (Ind)
Davenport	Liberal	David Cox	**Dean Brown**	John Phillips	
Elizabeth	Labor	**Peter Duncan**	Dick Pratt	Colin Nieass	
Eyre	Liberal	Barry Piltz	**Graham Gunn**		
Fisher	Liberal	Alvan Roman	**Stan Evans**	Robert Hercus	
Flinders	NCP	Terrence Krieg	Brian Fitzgerald		**Peter Blacker** (NCP)
Florey	Labor	Harold O'Neill	Lois Bell	Shylie Gilfillan	
Gilles	Labor	**Jack Slater**	Jodi Tabalotny	Eileen Farmer	
Glenelg	Liberal	Maurice Hearn	**John Mathwin**	Diana Harte	
Goyder	Independent	Roger Thomas	**Keith Russack**		
Hanson	Liberal	Peter Rowe	**Heini Becker**	Stanley Gilbie	
Hartley	Labor	**Des Corcoran**	David Parish	Geoffrey Brown	
Henley Beach	Labor	Don Ferguson	Bob Randall	Kenneth Maguire	
Kavel	Liberal	Sydney Tilmouth	**Roger Goldsworthy**	Ivor Childs	
Light	Liberal	William Young	**Bruce Eastick**	Barrie Tornquist	
Mallee	Liberal	Dale Thiel	**Peter Lewis**		Ronald Hentschke (Ind); Guy Wheal (NCP)
Mawson	Labor	**Leslie Drury**	Ivar Schmidt	Jay McMerrick	
Mitcham	Democrats	Rosemary Crowley	Robert Worth	**Robin Millhouse**	Ian Modistach (AP)
Mitchell	Labor	**Ron Payne**	Thomas Wallace	Kevin Whitby	
Morphett	Labor	**Terry Groom**	John Oswald	Elizabeth Topperwien	
Mount Gambier	Liberal	Graham Bath	**Harold Allison**		
Murray	Liberal	Jack Pitcher	**David Wotton**	Gerhard Weissmann	
Napier	Labor	**Terry Hemmings**	Eric Bates	John Ferguson	
Newland	Labor	**John Klunder**	Brian Billard	Stephen Farrelly	
Norwood	Labor	**Greg Crafter**	Frank Webster	Jeffrey Heath	
Peake	Labor	Keith Plunkett	Marko Milosevic		
Playford	Labor	**Terry McRae**	Neville Mitchell	John Longhurst	
Price	Labor	**George Whitten**	David Beames	Robert Manhire	
Rocky River	Liberal	Denis Crisp	John Olsen		Helen Tiller (NCP)
Ross Smith	Labor	**John Bannon**	Ruth Squire	Margaret-Ann Williams	
Salisbury	Labor	Lynn Arnold	Derrick Rich		
Semaphore	Labor	George Apap	Mac Lawrie	Dean Richards	Norm Peterson (Ind Lab)
Spence	Labor	**Roy Abbott**	Barry Lewis		
Stuart	Labor	**Gavin Keneally**	Sydney Cheesman		
Todd	Labor	**Molly Byrne**	Scott Ashenden	Michael Reglar	
Torrens	Liberal	Ralph Clarke	**Michael Wilson**	Stuart Brasted	
Unley	Labor	**Gil Langley**	Robert Nicholls	Albert Apponyi	
Victoria	Liberal	Terry Roberts	**Allan Rodda**		
Whyalla	Labor	**Max Brown**	Vivienne Cruickshank	Ella Smith	David Sims (Ind)

== Legislative Council ==
Sitting members are shown in bold text. Tickets that elected at least one MLC are highlighted in the relevant colour. Successful candidates are identified by an asterisk (*). Eleven seats were up for election. The Labor Party was defending four seats. The Liberal Party was defending six seats. There was one additional new seat, not held by any party.

Labor candidates	Liberal candidates	Democrats candidates	NCP candidates	Group D candidates	Other candidates
1. **Brian Chatterton***; 2. **Cecil Creedon***; 3. Gordon Bruce*; 4. Barbara Wiese*; 5. James Hennessy; 6. Erwin Williamson; 7. Giovanni Vassallo	1. **Ren DeGaris***; 2. **Trevor Griffin***; 3. **Arthur Whyte***; 4. Legh Davis*; 5. **John Burdett***; 6. Robert Ritson*; 7. Amanda Vanstone	1. Lance Milne*; 2. Christopher Harte; 3. Raymond Buttery; 4. Nicholas Theologou; 5. Brian Fain; 6. Robert North	1. Warren Norton; 2. Allan Woolford; 3. Wayne Murphy	1. Harold Steele; 2. Emily Perry; 3. Peter Clifton	Stephen Dimitriou (AMP); Screw Parasites (Ind)
