= Electoral results for the district of Florey =

South Australian district election results

This is a list of electoral results for the Electoral district of Florey in South Australian state elections.

== Members for Florey ==
Member	Party	Term
Charles Wells	Labor	1970–1979
Harold O'Neill	Labor	1979–1982
Bob Gregory	Labor	1982–1993
Sam Bass	Liberal	1993–1997
Frances Bedford	Labor	1997–2017
Frances Bedford	Independent	2017–2022
Michael Brown	Labor	2022–present

== Election results ==
=== Elections in the 2020s ===
==== 2026 ====
2026 South Australian state election: Florey
Party	Candidate	Votes	%	±%
Labor	Michael Brown	10,376	47.3	−1.6
One Nation	Riley Size	5,038	23.0	+23.0
Greens	Alexandra McGee	2,344	10.7	+0.4
Liberal	Denise George	2,054	9.4	−19.0
Independent	Frances Bedford	1,059	4.8	+4.8
Family First	Mark Hawke	707	3.2	−3.2
Australian Family	Dieter Fischer	206	0.9	+0.9
Fair Go	Robert Jameson	87	0.4	+0.4
United Voice	Trent Wilton	65	0.3	+0.3
Total formal votes		21,936	94.4	−1.5
Informal votes		1,292	5.6	+1.5
Turnout		23,228	88.2	+0.4
Two-candidate-preferred result
Labor	Michael Brown	14,505	66.1	+3.3
One Nation	Riley Size	7,431	33.9	+33.9
Labor hold				

==== 2022 ====
2022 South Australian state election: Florey
Party	Candidate	Votes	%	±%
Labor	Michael Brown	10,866	48.9	+8.7
Liberal	Janice McShane	6,298	28.4	+7.0
Greens	Felicity Green	2,294	10.3	+4.5
Family First	Daniel Masullo	1,428	6.4	+6.4
Independent	Tessa Kowaliw	1,326	6.0	+6.0
Total formal votes		22,212	95.9	
Informal votes		938	4.1	
Turnout		23,150	87.8	
Two-party-preferred result
Labor	Michael Brown	13,955	62.8	−0.6
Liberal	Janice McShane	8,257	37.2	+0.6
Labor notional hold		Swing	−0.6	

Distribution of preferences: Florey
Party	Candidate	Votes	Round 1		Round 2		Round 3	
Party	Candidate	Votes	Dist.	Total	Dist.	Total	Dist.	Total
Quota (50% + 1)		11,107						
Labor	Michael Brown	10,866	+299	11,165	+647	11,812	+2,143	13,955
Liberal	Janice McShane	6,298	+224	6,522	+615	7,137	+1,120	8,257
Greens	Felicity Green	2,294	+360	2,654	+609	3,263	Excluded	
Family First	Daniel Masullo	1,428	+443	1,871	Excluded			
Independent	Tessa Kowaliw	1,326	Excluded					

=== Elections in the 2010s ===
==== 2018 ====
2018 South Australian state election: Florey
Party	Candidate	Votes	%	±%
Labor	Rik Morris	7,451	32.8	−17.1
Independent	Frances Bedford	6,962	30.6	+30.6
Liberal	Gagan Sharma	4,768	21.0	−13.4
Conservatives	John Peake	1,132	5.0	−4.1
Greens	Adam Gatt	1,101	4.8	−1.8
Animal Justice	Geoff Russell	885	3.9	+3.9
Dignity	Suzi Waechter	418	1.8	+1.8
Total formal votes		22,717	93.3	−2.8
Informal votes		1,621	6.7	+2.8
Turnout		24,338	91.0	−0.4
Two-party-preferred result
Labor	Rik Morris	13,852	61.0	+1.9
Liberal	Gagan Sharma	8,865	39.0	−1.9
Two-candidate-preferred result
Independent	Frances Bedford	12,746	56.1	+56.1
Labor	Rik Morris	9,971	43.9	−15.2
Independent gain from Labor				

2014 South Australian state election: Florey
Party	Candidate	Votes	%	±%
Labor	Frances Bedford	8,983	43.8	−1.1
Liberal	Damian Wyld	8,317	40.6	+3.0
Family First	Richard Bunting	1,677	8.2	+1.5
Greens	Kim Thomson	1,517	7.4	+0.9
Total formal votes		20,494	96.7	+0.2
Informal votes		708	3.3	−0.2
Turnout		21,202	92.5	−1.2
Two-party-preferred result
Labor	Frances Bedford	10,755	52.5	−1.1
Liberal	Damian Wyld	9,739	47.5	+1.1
Labor hold		Swing	−1.1	

2010 South Australian state election: Florey
Party	Candidate	Votes	%	±%
Labor	Frances Bedford	9,339	44.9	−7.7
Liberal	Pat Trainor	7,811	37.6	+7.0
Family First	Andrew Graham	1,380	6.6	−0.8
Greens	Craig McKay	1,347	6.5	+0.8
Save the RAH	Denes Marantos	905	4.4	+4.4
Total formal votes		20,782	96.3	
Informal votes		756	3.7	
Turnout		21,538	93.7	
Two-party-preferred result
Labor	Frances Bedford	11,132	53.6	−8.5
Liberal	Pat Trainor	9,650	46.4	+8.5
Labor hold		Swing	−8.5	

=== Elections in the 2000s ===
2006 South Australian state election: Florey
Party	Candidate	Votes	%	±%
Labor	Frances Bedford	10,042	52.9	+9.7
Liberal	Pat Trainor	5,811	30.6	−6.0
Family First	Richard Bunting	1,410	7.4	+0.7
Greens	Craig McKay	1,083	5.7	+2.1
Democrats	Catherine Opitz	636	3.4	−3.5
Total formal votes		20,507	96.3	−0.9
Informal votes		734	3.7	+0.9
Turnout		21,241	93.3	−0.8
Two-party-preferred result
Labor	Frances Bedford	11,787	62.1	+8.5
Liberal	Pat Trainor	7,195	37.9	−8.5
Labor hold		Swing	+8.5	

2002 South Australian state election: Florey
Party	Candidate	Votes	%	±%
Labor	Frances Bedford	8,414	43.2	+5.1
Liberal	Lyn Petrie	7,096	36.4	−0.8
Democrats	Paul Rowse	1,341	6.9	−9.2
Family First	Rob Pillar	1,294	6.6	+6.6
Greens	Lisa Blake	718	3.7	+3.7
One Nation	Victor Horvat	613	3.1	+3.1
Total formal votes		19,476	97.2	
Informal votes		557	2.8	
Turnout		20,033	94.1	
Two-party-preferred result
Labor	Frances Bedford	10,462	53.7	+0.9
Liberal	Lyn Petrie	9,014	46.3	−0.9
Labor hold		Swing	+0.9	

=== Elections in the 1990s ===
1997 South Australian state election: Florey
Party	Candidate	Votes	%	±%
Liberal	Sam Bass	7,449	38.2	−16.7
Labor	Frances Bedford	7,085	36.3	+4.4
Democrats	Steve Bartholomew	3,113	16.0	+5.4
Independent	Michael Wohltmann	871	4.5	+4.5
Independent	Snowy Burns	650	3.3	+3.3
United Australia	Stan Batten	332	1.7	−0.7
Total formal votes		19,500	95.1	−2.0
Informal votes		996	4.9	+2.0
Turnout		20,496	92.8	
Two-party-preferred result
Labor	Frances Bedford	10,012	51.3	+12.3
Liberal	Sam Bass	9,488	48.7	−12.3
Labor gain from Liberal		Swing	+12.3	

1993 South Australian state election: Florey
Party	Candidate	Votes	%	±%
Liberal	Sam Bass	10,981	54.5	+14.6
Labor	Bob Gregory	6,522	32.4	−12.0
Democrats	Michael Pilling	2,122	10.5	−0.1
Independent	Stanley Batten	527	2.6	+2.6
Total formal votes		20,152	97.1	+0.3
Informal votes		608	2.9	−0.3
Turnout		20,760	94.6	
Two-party-preferred result
Liberal	Sam Bass	12,164	60.4	+12.2
Labor	Bob Gregory	7,988	39.6	−12.2
Liberal gain from Labor		Swing	+12.2	

=== Elections in the 1980s ===
1989 South Australian state election: Florey
Party	Candidate	Votes	%	±%
Labor	Bob Gregory	9,591	44.4	−11.1
Liberal	Richard Luther	8,650	40.1	+0.8
Democrats	Stephen Bartholomew	2,143	9.9	+4.7
Call to Australia	Cathryn Linedale	740	3.4	+3.4
Independent	Deborah Moran	474	2.2	+2.2
Total formal votes		21,598	96.7	−0.4
Informal votes		729	3.3	+0.4
Turnout		22,327	95.6	+0.6
Two-party-preferred result
Labor	Bob Gregory	11,181	51.8	−6.4
Liberal	Richard Luther	10,417	48.2	+6.4
Labor hold		Swing	−6.4	

1985 South Australian state election: Florey
Party	Candidate	Votes	%	±%
Labor	Bob Gregory	9,961	55.5	+2.5
Liberal	Martin Luther	7,047	39.3	−0.7
Democrats	Andrew Sickerdick	934	5.2	−0.8
Total formal votes		17,942	97.1	
Informal votes		537	2.9	
Turnout		18,479	95.0	
Two-party-preferred result
Labor	Bob Gregory	10,450	58.2	+2.2
Liberal	Martin Luther	7,492	41.8	−2.2
Labor hold		Swing	+2.2	

1982 South Australian state election: Florey
Party	Candidate	Votes	%	±%
Labor	Bob Gregory	9,213	57.9	+8.8
Liberal	Philip Bayly	5,004	31.4	−7.4
Democrats	Andrew Sickerdick	1,698	10.7	−1.4
Total formal votes		15,915	93.7	−0.7
Informal votes		1,070	6.3	+0.7
Turnout		16,985	93.7	+0.5
Two-party-preferred result
Labor	Bob Gregory	10,062	63.2	+9.5
Liberal	Philip Bayly	5,853	36.8	−9.5
Labor hold		Swing	+9.5	

1982 Florey state by-election
Party	Candidate	Votes	%	±%
Labor	Bob Gregory	7,575	56.6	+7.5
Liberal	Philip Bayly	3,736	27.9	−10.9
Democrats	Andrew Sickerdick	2,068	15.5	+3.4
Total formal votes		13,379	97.1	N/A
Informal votes		399	2.9	N/A
Turnout		13,778	79.1	N/A
Labor hold		Swing	N/A	

=== Elections in the 1970s ===
1979 South Australian state election: Florey
Party	Candidate	Votes	%	±%
Labor	Harold O'Neill	7,679	49.1	−17.9
Liberal	Lois Bell	6,060	38.8	+5.8
Democrats	Shylie Gilfillan	1,885	12.1	+12.1
Total formal votes		15,624	94.4	−2.2
Informal votes		928	5.6	+2.2
Turnout		16,552	93.2	−0.1
Two-party-preferred result
Labor	Harold O'Neill	8,386	53.7	−12.3
Liberal	Lois Bell	7,238	46.3	+12.3
Labor hold		Swing	−12.3	

1977 South Australian state election: Florey
Party	Candidate	Votes	%	±%
Labor	Charles Wells	10,824	67.0	+6.1
Liberal	John Wadey	5,325	33.0	+11.7
Total formal votes		16,149	96.6	
Informal votes		573	3.4	
Turnout		16,722	93.3	
Labor hold		Swing	+3.4	

1975 South Australian state election: Florey
Party	Candidate	Votes	%	±%
Labor	Charles Wells	12,006	61.6	−8.8
Liberal	Glyndwr Morgan	4,092	21.0	−8.6
Liberal Movement	Edward Smith	3,398	17.4	+17.4
Total formal votes		19,496	95.0	0.0
Informal votes		1,029	5.0	0.0
Turnout		20,525	93.9	−0.7
Two-party-preferred result
Labor	Charles Wells	12,341	63.3	−7.1
Liberal	Glyndwr Morgan	7,155	36.7	+7.1
Labor hold		Swing	−7.1	

1973 South Australian state election: Florey
Party	Candidate	Votes	%	±%
Labor	Charles Wells	12,517	70.4	+2.2
Liberal and Country	Anthony Deane-Shaw	5,262	29.6	−2.2
Total formal votes		17,779	95.0	−2.6
Informal votes		925	5.0	+2.6
Turnout		18,704	94.6	−1.1
Labor hold		Swing	+2.2	

1970 South Australian state election: Florey
Party	Candidate	Votes	%	±%
Labor	Charles Wells	10,683	68.2	
Liberal and Country	Anthony Deane-Shaw	4,991	31.8	
Total formal votes		15,674	97.6	
Informal votes		388	2.4	
Turnout		16,062	95.7	
Labor hold		Swing		
