= Electoral results for the district of Henley Beach =

Election results for Henley Beach, South Australia

This is a list of election results for the electoral district of Henley Beach in South Australian elections.

== Members for Henley Beach ==
Member	Party	Term
Glen Broomhill	Labor	1970–1979
Bob Randall	Liberal	1979–1982
Don Ferguson	Labor	1982–1993

== Election results ==
=== Elections in the 1980s ===
1989 South Australian state election: Henley Beach
Party	Candidate	Votes	%	±%
Labor	Don Ferguson	9,040	48.5	−6.1
Liberal	Bob Randall	7,673	41.1	+1.3
Democrats	Keith Lees	1,518	8.1	+3.9
Call to Australia	Peter Thompson	428	2.3	+2.3
Total formal votes		18,659	96.6	−0.2
Informal votes		657	3.4	+0.2
Turnout		19,316	95.0	+0.5
Two-party-preferred result
Labor	Don Ferguson	10,077	54.0	−3.3
Liberal	Bob Randall	8,582	46.0	+3.3
Labor hold		Swing	−3.3	

1985 South Australian state election: Henley Beach
Party	Candidate	Votes	%	±%
Labor	Don Ferguson	9,876	54.6	+2.6
Liberal	Bob Randall	7,204	39.8	−3.2
Democrats	Gladys Wells	753	4.2	−0.8
Independent	Joe Rossi	264	1.4	+1.4
Total formal votes		18,097	96.8	
Informal votes		595	3.2	
Turnout		18,692	94.5	
Two-party-preferred result
Labor	Don Ferguson	10,373	57.3	+3.3
Liberal	Bob Randall	7,724	42.7	−3.3
Labor hold		Swing	+3.3	

1982 South Australian state election: Henley Beach
Party	Candidate	Votes	%	±%
Labor	Don Ferguson	8,782	51.4	+7.5
Liberal	Bob Randall	7,409	43.4	−1.1
Democrats	Trevor Turner	882	5.2	−6.4
Total formal votes		17,073	94.2	−0.8
Informal votes		1,049	5.8	+0.8
Turnout		18,122	94.3	+1.3
Two-party-preferred result
Labor	Don Ferguson	9,216	54.0	+5.0
Liberal	Bob Randall	7,857	46.0	−5.0
Labor gain from Liberal		Swing	+5.0	

=== Elections in the 1970s ===
1979 South Australian state election: Henley Beach
Party	Candidate	Votes	%	±%
Liberal	Bob Randall	7,244	44.5	+3.8
Labor	Don Ferguson	7,143	43.9	−15.4
Democrats	Kenneth Maguire	1,878	11.6	+11.6
Total formal votes		16,265	95.0	−1.5
Informal votes		862	5.0	+1.5
Turnout		17,127	93.0	−1.0
Two-party-preferred result
Liberal	Bob Randall	8,289	51.0	+10.3
Labor	Don Ferguson	7,976	49.0	−10.3
Liberal gain from Labor		Swing	+10.3	

1977 South Australian state election: Henley Beach
Party	Candidate	Votes	%	±%
Labor	Glen Broomhill	9,780	59.3	+4.4
Liberal	Barry Lawson	6,702	40.7	+11.3
Total formal votes		16,482	96.5	
Informal votes		590	3.5	
Turnout		17,072	94.0	
Labor hold		Swing	+2.0	

1975 South Australian state election: Henley Beach
Party	Candidate	Votes	%	±%
Labor	Glen Broomhill	9,780	52.3	−4.7
Liberal	John Rogers	5,845	31.3	−2.1
Liberal Movement	Trevor Vivian	3,057	16.4	+16.4
Total formal votes		18,682	96.1	−0.7
Informal votes		754	3.9	+0.7
Turnout		19,436	93.7	
Two-party-preferred result
Labor	Glen Broomhill	10,088	54.0	−6.2
Liberal	John Rogers	8,594	46.0	+6.2
Labor hold		Swing	−6.2	

1973 South Australian state election: Henley Beach
Party	Candidate	Votes	%	±%
Labor	Glen Broomhill	9,661	57.0	−0.9
Liberal and Country	Reginald Appelkamp	5,668	33.4	−8.7
Independent	Daniel Overduin	1,633	9.6	+9.6
Total formal votes		16,962	96.8	−1.3
Informal votes		564	3.2	+1.3
Turnout		17,526	94.1	−1.3
Two-party-preferred result
Labor	Glen Broomhill	10,211	60.2	+2.3
Liberal and Country	Reginald Appelkamp	6,751	39.8	−2.3
Labor hold		Swing	+2.3	

1970 South Australian state election: Henley Beach
Party	Candidate	Votes	%	±%
Labor	Glen Broomhill	8,918	57.9	
Liberal and Country	Alwyn Whiteford	6,483	42.1	
Total formal votes		15,401	98.1	
Informal votes		298	1.9	
Turnout		15,699	95.4	
Labor hold		Swing		
