= 1979 South Australian state election =

- 15 September 1979

All 47 seats in the South Australian House of Assembly 24 seats were needed for a majority 11 (of the 22) seats in the South Australian Legislative Council
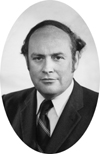
| | First party | Second party | Third party |
|---|---|---|---|
| | | | DEM |
| Leader | David Tonkin | Des Corcoran | Robin Millhouse |
| Party | Liberal | Labor | Democrats |
| Leader since | 24 July 1975 | 15 February 1979 |
| Leader's seat | Bragg | Hartley | Mitcham |
| Seats before | 18 | 27 | 1 |
| Seats won | 24 | 20 | 1 |
| Seat change | ▲6 | ▼7 | Steady |
| Popular vote | 352,343 | 300,277 | 60,797 |
| Percentage | 47.94% | 40.86% | 8.30% |
| Swing | ▲6.73pp | ▼10.78pp | ▲4.82pp |
| TPP | 55.0% | 45.0% |
| TPP swing | ▲8.40pp | ▼8.40pp |
| | Fourth party |
| | NAT |
| Leader | Peter Blacker |
| Party | National |
| Leader's seat | Flinders |
| Seats before | 1 |
| Seats won | 1 |
| Seat change | Steady |
| Popular vote | 14,013 |
| Percentage | 1.91% |
| Swing | ▲0.31pp |
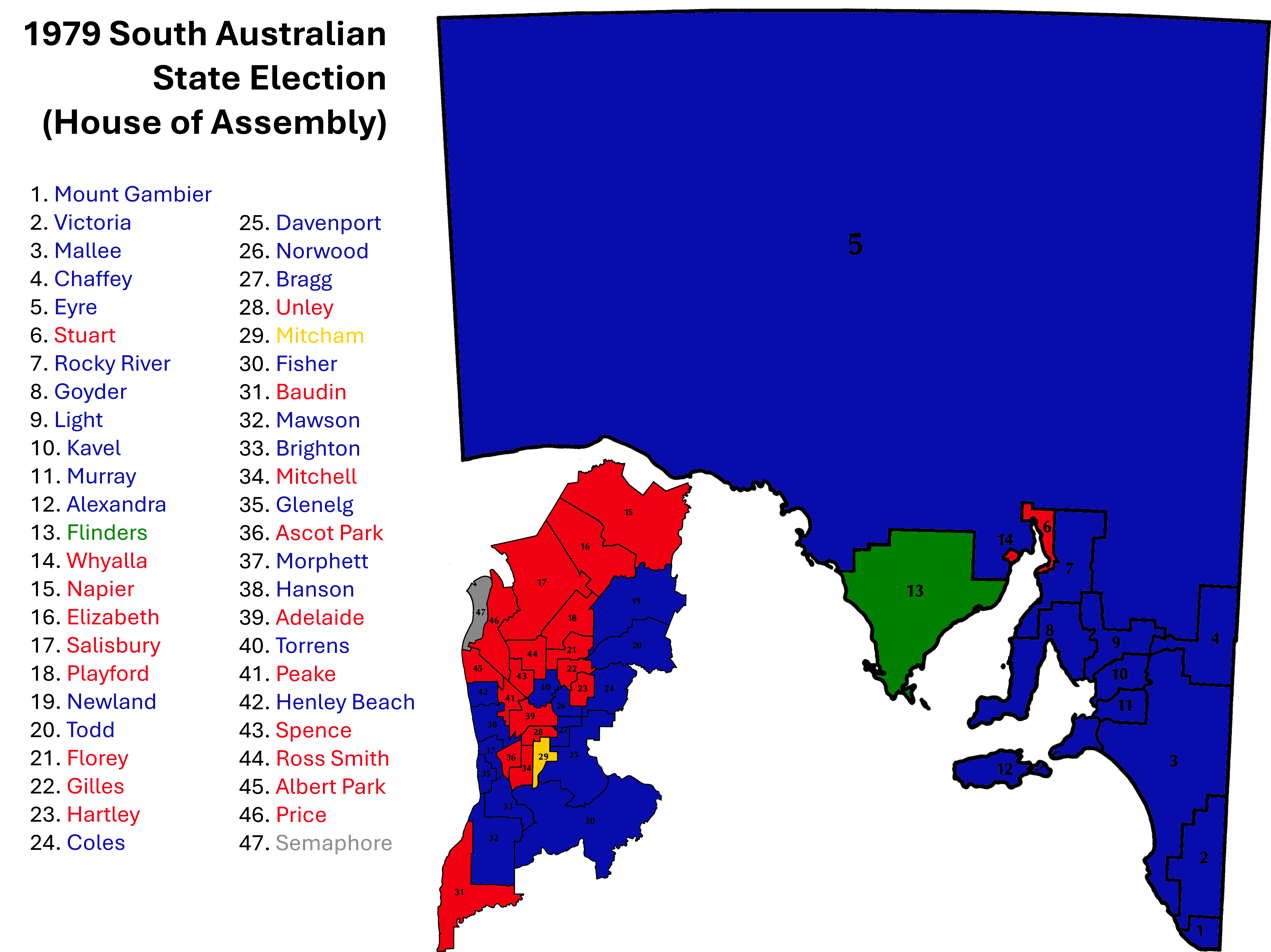
- Results by electoral division for the House of Assembly.
Premier before election
Des Corcoran
Labor
Elected Premier
David Tonkin
Liberal

State elections were held in South Australia on 15 September 1979. All 47 seats in the South Australian House of Assembly were up for election. The incumbent Australian Labor Party led by Premier of South Australia Des Corcoran was defeated by the Liberal Party of Australia led by Leader of the Opposition David Tonkin.

The Liberals originally won 25 seats, but a court decision overturned their win in Norwood. Labor won the Norwood by-election, which meant the Liberals held 24 seats, with Labor on 20 seats, and 1 each to the Australian Democrats, National Country Party, and an Independent Labor.

== Background ==
Premier Don Dunstan abruptly resigned as premier on 15 February 1979, due to ill health, and was succeeded by Deputy Premier Des Corcoran. Dunstan also resigned from parliament, and his seat was retained for Labor by Greg Crafter at the by-election in March 1979.

Spurred by positive opinion polls, and seeking to escape the shadow of Dunstan by gaining a mandate of his own, Corcoran called a snap election, without informing the party apparatus. The election campaign was plagued by problems, which allowed an opening for the Liberals under Tonkin. It did not help matters that The Advertiser was biased toward the Liberal campaign.

== Results ==
Labor suffered a large swing, losing seven seats (six to the Liberals, one to Independent Labor Norm Peterson). The Liberals also won 55 percent of the two-party vote to Labor's 45 percent. In most of Australia, this would have been enough for a landslide Liberal victory. However, much of the Liberal margin was wasted on landslides in their heartland. The Liberals only won 13 seats in Adelaide, netting them a total of 25 seats, a bare majority of two. Narrow as it was, it was the first time the main non-Labor party in South Australia had won the most seats while also winning a majority of the vote since the Liberal and Country League won 50.3 percent of the two-party vote in 1959.

The Liberal majority was pared back even further after the Court of Disputed Returns struck down the result in Norwood. The court found that a Liberal Party advertisement in an Italian language newspaper, which described Liberal candidate Frank Webster as "your representative" ("il vostro deputato"), gave the false impression that Webster was already the sitting member. Labor's Greg Crafter, who had briefly succeeded Dunstan upon his resignation, regained Norwood at the 1980 Norwood state by-election. This dropped the Liberals to 24 seats, just enough to govern.

In the South Australian Legislative Council, the Liberals won 6 seats, Labor won 4, and Australian Democrats won 1; giving numbers of 11 Liberal, 10 Labor and 1 Democrat, leaving the Liberal government one seat short of a majority.

== Aftermath ==
Corcoran was bitter in defeat, believing sections of the ALP had undermined him during the campaign. He resigned as leader soon after the election, and retired from politics in 1982.

In 1982, when legislation to enable the Roxby Downs uranium mine was opposed by both Labor and the Democrats, Norm Foster resigned from the Labor Party to support the legislation, and sat as an independent in the Legislative Council.

== Key dates ==
- House of Assembly dissolved: 22 August 1979, 2:00pm
- Issue of writ: 27 August 1979
- Close of nominations: 5 September 1979
- Polling day: 15 September 1979
- Return of writ: On or before 5 October 1979

== Results ==
=== House of Assembly ===
Arrangement of the House of Assembly after the 1979 state election.

These numbers include the result of the 1980 Norwood state by-election.

South Australian state election, 15 September 1979 House of Assembly << 1977–1982 >>
| Enrolled voters | 826,586 | | | | |
| Votes cast | 769,080 | | Turnout | 93.04 | -0.33 |
| Informal votes | 34,104 | | Informal | 4.43 | +1.72 |
Summary of votes by party
| Party | Primary votes | % | Swing | Seats | Change |
| Liberal | 352,343 | 47.94 | +6.73 | 24 | + 6 |
| Labor | 300,277 | 40.86 | –10.78 | 20 | – 7 |
| Democrats | 60,979 | 8.30 | +4.82 | 1 | ± 0 |
| National Country | 14,013 | 1.91 | +0.31 | 1 | ± 0 |
| Independent | 7,364 | 1.00 | +0.61 | 1 | + 1 |
| Total | 734,976 | | | 47 | |
Two-party-preferred
| Liberal | 404,232 | 55.00 | +8.40 | | |
| Labor | 330,734 | 45.00 | –8.40 | | |

=== Seats changing hands ===
| Seat | Pre-1979 | | | Swing | Post-1979 | | |
| Seat | Party | Member | Margin | Swing | Margin | Member | Party |
|---|---|---|---|---|---|---|---|
| Brighton | Labor | Hugh Hudson | 7.8 | 12.5 | 4.7 | Dick Glazbrook | Liberal |
| Goyder | Independent | Keith Russack* | 7.9 | N/A | 27.1 | Keith Russack | Liberal |
| Henley Beach | Labor | Glen Broomhill | 9.3 | 10.3 | 1.0 | Bob Randall | Liberal |
| Mawson | Labor | Leslie Drury | 6.5 | 9.5 | 3.0 | Ivar Schmidt | Liberal |
| Morphett | Labor | Terry Groom | 0.4 | 5.7 | 5.3 | John Oswald | Liberal |
| Newland | Labor | John Klunder | 9.5 | 15.7 | 5.9 | Brian Billard | Liberal |
| Semaphore | Labor | Jack Olson | 22.2 | N/A | 12.2 | Norm Peterson | Independent |
| Todd | Labor | Molly Byrne | 6.5 | 11.1 | 4.6 | Scott Ashenden | Liberal |

- Members in italics did not recontest their seats.
- Keith Russack was elected in 1977 as an Independent, but joined the Liberal party soon after.

=== Legislative Council ===
Arrangement of the Legislative Council after the 1979 state election.

South Australian state election, 15 September 1979 Legislative Council << 1975–1982 >>
| Enrolled voters | 826,586 | | | | |
| Votes cast | 765,032 | | Turnout | 92.6 | –0.7 |
| Informal votes | 33,637 | | Informal | 4.4 | –0.8 |
Summary of votes by party
| Party | Primary votes | % | Swing | Seats won | Seats held |
| Liberal | 370,398 | 50.6 | +22.8 | 6 | 11 |
| Labor | 290,552 | 39.7 | –7.6 | 4 | 10 |
| Democrats | 47,527 | 6.5 | +6.5 | 1 | 1 |
| National Country | 7,716 | 1.1 | –1.0 | 0 | 0 |
| Marijuana | 6,132 | 0.8 | +0.8 | 0 | 0 |
| Other | 9,070 | 1.3 | * | 0 | 0 |
| Total | 731,395 | | | 11 | 22 |

== Post-election pendulum ==
These numbers include the result of the 1980 Norwood state by-election.

Subsequently, the 1982 Mitcham by-election and 1982 Florey by-election were held. The Democrats retained Mitcham by 45 votes, while Labor increased their margin in Florey.

Liberal seats (24)
Marginal
| Henley Beach | Bob Randall | LIB | 1.0% |
| Mawson | Ivar Schmidt | LIB | 3.0% |
| Todd | Scott Ashenden | LIB | 4.6% |
| Brighton | Dick Glazbrook | LIB | 4.7% |
| Morphett | John Oswald | LIB | 5.3% |
| Mount Gambier | Harold Allison | LIB | 5.6% |
| Newland | Brian Billard | LIB | 5.9% |
Fairly safe
| Mallee | Peter Lewis | LIB | 7.3% v NAT |
| Eyre | Graham Gunn | LIB | 9.9% |
Safe
| Torrens | Michael Wilson | LIB | 10.1% |
| Coles | Jennifer Adamson | LIB | 12.0% |
| Rocky River | John Olsen | LIB | 13.1% |
| Chaffey | Peter Arnold | LIB | 13.8% |
| Hanson | Heini Becker | LIB | 14.5% |
| Murray | David Wotton | LIB | 15.9% |
| Glenelg | John Mathwin | LIB | 17.2% |
| Light | Bruce Eastick | LIB | 17.2% |
| Victoria | Allan Rodda | LIB | 18.0% |
| Fisher | Stan Evans | LIB | 18.7% |
| Bragg | David Tonkin | LIB | 21.5% |
| Alexandra | Ted Chapman | LIB | 24.0% |
| Kavel | Roger Goldsworthy | LIB | 24.3% |
| Goyder | Keith Russack | LIB | 27.1% |
| Davenport | Dean Brown | LIB | 29.7% |

Labor seats (20)
Marginal
| Ascot Park | John Trainer | ALP | 1.7% |
| Unley | Gil Langley | ALP | 2.3% |
| Norwood* | Greg Crafter | ALP | 3.1% |
| Florey | Harold O'Neill | ALP | 3.7% |
| Albert Park | Kevin Hamilton | ALP | 3.9% |
| Mitchell | Ron Payne | ALP | 4.3% |
| Hartley | Des Corcoran | ALP | 5.1% |
| Playford | Terry McRae | ALP | 5.1% |
| Gilles | Jack Slater | ALP | 5.4% |
| Baudin | Don Hopgood | ALP | 5.7% |
Fairly safe
| Peake | Keith Plunkett | ALP | 7.8% |
| Napier | Terry Hemmings | ALP | 9.5% |
Safe
| Price | George Whitten | ALP | 10.5% |
| Adelaide | Jack Wright | ALP | 10.7% |
| Salisbury | Lynn Arnold | ALP | 10.8% |
| Elizabeth | Peter Duncan | ALP | 10.9% |
| Whyalla | Max Brown | ALP | 16.7% |
| Stuart | Gavin Keneally | ALP | 17.0% |
| Ross Smith | John Bannon | ALP | 18.4% |
| Spence | Roy Abbott | ALP | 20.2% |
Crossbench seats (3)
| Mitcham | Robin Millhouse | DEM | 4.7% v LIB |
| Semaphore | Norm Peterson | IND | 12.2% v ALP |
| Flinders | Peter Blacker | NCP | 20.1% v LIB |

== See also ==
- Results of the South Australian state election, 1979 (House of Assembly)
- Results of the 1979 South Australian state election (Legislative Council)
- Members of the South Australian House of Assembly, 1979-1982
- Members of the South Australian Legislative Council, 1979-1982
