= Results of the 1979 South Australian state election (Legislative Council) =

South Australian state election, 15 September 1979 Legislative Council << 1975–1982 >>
Enrolled voters	826,586				
Votes cast	765,032		Turnout	92.6	–0.7
Informal votes	33,637		Informal	4.4	–0.8
Summary of votes by party
Party	Primary votes	%	Swing	Seats won	Seats held
Liberal	370,398	50.6	+22.8	6	11
Labor	290,552	39.7	–7.6	4	10
Democrats	47,527	6.5	+6.5	1	1
National Country	7,716	1.1	–1.0	0	0
Marijuana	6,132	0.8	+0.8	0	0
Other	9,070	1.3	*	0	0
Total	731,395			11	22

This is a list of results for the Legislative Council at the 1979 South Australian state election.

== Continuing members ==
The following MLCs were not up for re-election this year.

Member	Party	Term
Frank Blevins	Labor	1975–1982
John Cornwall	Labor	1975–1982
Jim Dunford	Labor	1975–1982
Anne Levy	Labor	1975–1982
Chris Sumner	Labor	1975–1982
Norm Foster	Labor	1975–1982
Martin Cameron	Liberal	1975–1982
John Carnie	Liberal	1975–1982
Boyd Dawkins	Liberal	1975–1982
Murray Hill	Liberal	1975–1982
Don Laidlaw	Liberal	1975–1982

== Election results ==
1979 South Australian state election: Legislative Council
Party	Candidate	Votes	%	±%
Quota		60,852		
Liberal	1. Ren DeGaris (elected); 2. Trevor Griffin (elected); 3. Arthur Whyte (elected); 4. Legh Davis (elected); 5. John Burdett (elected); 6. Robert Ritson (elected); 7. Amanda Vanstone	370,398	50.6	+22.8
Labor	1. Brian Chatterton (elected); 2. Cec Creedon (elected); 3. Gordon Bruce (elected); 4. Barbara Wiese (elected); 5. James Hennessy; 6. Erwin Williamson; 7. Giovanni Vassallo	290,552	39.7	−7.6
Democrats	1. Lance Milne (elected); 2. Christopher Harte; 3. Raymond Buttery; 4. Nicholas Theologou; 5. Brian Fain; 6. Robert North	47,527	6.5	+6.5
National	1. Warren Norton; 2. Allan Woolford; 3. Wayne Murphy	7,716	1.1	−1.0
Marijuana	Stephen Dimitriou	6,132	0.8	+0.8
Group D	1. Harold Steele; 2. Emily Perry; 3. Peter Clifton	5,671	0.8	+0.8
Independent	Screw Parasites	3,399	0.5	+0.5
Total formal votes		731,395	95.6	+0.8
Informal votes		33,637	4.4	−0.8
Turnout		765,032	92.6	−0.7

== See also ==
- Candidates of the 1979 South Australian state election
- Members of the South Australian Legislative Council, 1979–1982
