= Roy Moir =

Australian politician

Albert Roy Moir (23 December 1897 – 16 September 1964) was an Australian politician who represented the South Australian House of Assembly seat of Norwood from 1941 to 1944 and 1947 to 1953 for the Liberal and Country League.

In local politics, he served as mayor of the Town of Kensington and Norwood from 1946 to 1951.

South Australian House of Assembly
Preceded by Frank Nieass	Member for Norwood; 1941–1944	Succeeded by Frank Nieass
Preceded by Frank Nieass	Member for Norwood; 1947–1953	Succeeded by Don Dunstan
