= Frank Nieass =

Australian politician

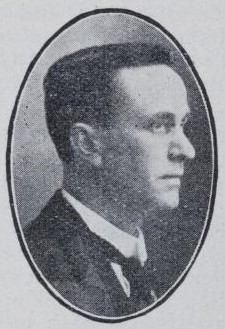

Frank Keen Nieass (25 October 1886 – 28 August 1967) was an Australian politician. He was a Labor member of the South Australian House of Assembly, representing East Torrens from 1930 to 1933 and Norwood from 1938 to 1941 and from 1944 to 1947. He was a long-serving secretary of the Australian Government Workers Association.

South Australian House of Assembly
Preceded by Walter Hamilton; Albert Sutton; Frederick Coneybeer	Member for East Torrens; 1930–1933; With: Beasley Kearney; Arthur McArthur	Succeeded by Charles Abbott; Walter Hamilton; Frank Perry
New district	Member for Norwood; 1938–1941	Succeeded by Roy Moir
Preceded by Roy Moir	Member for Norwood; 1944–1947	Succeeded by Roy Moir
