= Vini Ciccarello =

Australian politician

Member of the South Australian Parliament for Norwood
- In office 11 October 1997 – 20 March 2010
- Preceded by: John Cummins
- Succeeded by: Steven Marshall

Personal details
- Born: 1947 (age 78–79)
- Citizenship: Australian
- Party: Labor Party

Vincenzina "Vini" Ciccarello (born 1947) is a former Australian Labor Party MP for the electoral district of Norwood in South Australia. She was also the mayor of the City of Kensington and Norwood for seven years.

Ciccarello first won the seat of Norwood at the 1997 election. She retained the seat at the 2002 and 2006 election, but lost the seat at the 2010 election to Liberal Party candidate Steven Marshall.

She was appointed as a member of the Libraries Board of South Australia in 2012.

Ciccarello stood for local government election in the City of Norwood Payneham & St Peters in 2018 but was not elected.

South Australian House of Assembly
Preceded by John Cummins	Member for Norwood; 1997–2010	Succeeded by Steven Marshall
