= 1982 Florey state by-election =

A by-election was held for the South Australian House of Assembly seat of Florey on 4 September 1982. This was triggered by the resignation of state Labor MHA Harold O'Neill. The seat had been retained by Labor since it was created and first contested at the 1970 state election.

== Results ==
Labor easily retained the seat.

Florey state by-election, 4 September 1982
Party	Candidate	Votes	%	±%
Labor	Bob Gregory	7,575	56.6	+7.5
Liberal	Philip Bayly	3,736	27.9	−10.9
Democrats	Andrew Sickerdick	2,068	15.5	+3.4
Total formal votes		13,379	97.1	+2.7
Informal votes		399	2.9	−2.7
Turnout		13,778	79.1	−14.1
Labor hold		Swing	N/A	

== See also ==
- List of South Australian House of Assembly by-elections
