= Jeffrey Heath (disability advocate) =

Australian Paralympic archer and disability advocate

Jeffrey Stewart Heath AM (15 October 1955 – 7 March 2004) was an Australian Paralympic archer and a disability publisher and advocate.

== Personal ==
Heath was born on 15 October 1955 at Glenelg, South Australia. From the age of seven he used a wheelchair due to bone cancer. In 1979, Heath completed an Associate Diploma (Recreation), Salisbury CAE and in 1983 he completed a Bachelor of Arts (Recreation), University of South Australia. He was married to Yvonne Baillie and they have a daughter. He died of mesothelioma on 7 March 2004.

== Sporting career ==
Heath competed in archery and dartchery at the 1976 Summer Paralympic Games in Toronto, Canada. He finished eleventh in the Men's Novice Round Open, ninth in the Men's Pairs Open and eighth in the Mixed Novice and Tetraplegics Round Team A-C.

== Employment ==
Heath's employment involved working on disability and inclusion issues for organisations based in Adelaide. He was the editor of Link, a leading Australian disability magazine. He was the founder of the Disability Information Resource Centre in Adelaide. From 1988 to 1993, he was executive director of Disabled Peoples International (DPI) South Australia.

== Politics ==
Heath was a member of the Australian Democrats, representative for South Australia on the national executive and national journal editor. He unsuccessfully stood for the electorate of Norwood at the 1982 South Australian state election. At the 2001 Australian Federal Election, he was number two on the South Australian Senate ticket and was not elected.

== Recognition ==
- 1972 - Queen Scout Award, a Rotary youth leadership award
- 1981 - Selected to lead Australia's first street march for people with disabilities in Sydney in 1981.
- 1996 - Churchill Fellowship to study the production and exhibition of goods and services for disabled people - Germany, United Kingdom and United States.
- 2000 - Torch bearer Sydney 2000 Paralympics.
- 2003 - Member of the Order of Australia for service to people with disabilities as an advocate for improved services and through the publication of Link magazine.
