= Frances Bedford =

Australian politician

Frances Bedford JP
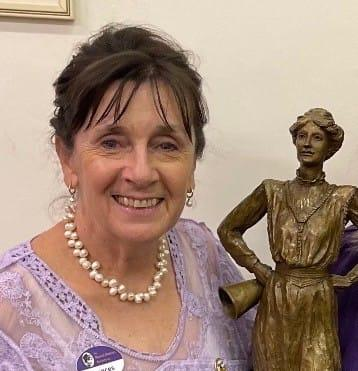

43rd Deputy Speaker and Chairman of Committees of the South Australian House of Assembly
- In office 6 May 2014 – 2 May 2018
- Premier: Jay Weatherill
- Preceded by: Tony Piccolo
- Succeeded by: Peter Treloar

Member of the South Australian Parliament for Florey
- In office 11 October 1997 – 19 March 2022
- Preceded by: Sam Bass
- Succeeded by: Michael Brown

Personal details
- Born: Frances Ellen Bedford; November 5, 1953 (age 72) Sydney, Australia
- Party: Independent (2017–present); Labor (1997–2017)
- Children: 2
- Parents: Francis Bedford (father); Margaret Pacitti (mother)
- Education: Santa Sabina College, Sydney, Australia
- Profession: Politician, activist
- Website: Former Member Profile

Frances Ellen Bedford (born 5 November 1953) is an Australian politician who represented the South Australian House of Assembly seat of Florey from 1997 until 2022, first for the Labor Party and as an independent from 2017.

== Early life and education ==
Francis Ellen Bedford was educated at Santa Sabina College in Strathfield, New South Wales.

Bedford, her father and siblings moved to Melbourne and then Adelaide after the death of her mother in 1966.

== Career ==
Bedford became involved in politics and became an electorate officer for former Labor MP Peter Duncan, who also served as her campaign manager during her first election.

Bedford was elected to the South Australian House of Assembly seat of Florey at the 1997 state election for the Labor Party, defeating incumbent Sam Bass with 51% of the two-party-preferred (2PP) vote; in addition to the 1997 election win, Bedford also contested and won the 2002, 2006, 2010, and 2014 elections as the Labor candidate. LGBT rights and health activist Jim Hyde served as her campaign manager in Adelaide for the 1997 election, and also helped her (from Melbourne) in her later Florey campaigns.

At the 2018 state election, she successfully ran as an independent candidate, winning 56.1% of the 2PP vote. Bedford's 2018 electoral victory was following her resignation from the Labor Party in March 2017 following Labor's preselection of Jack Snelling as a result of the major electoral redistribution which moved two-thirds of Snelling's Playford electoral voters into Florey; at the time of her resignation, Bedford argued that Labor's ‘faceless men’ had removed the ability for any non-faction-aligned Labor Members from being able to win preselection in the party and that they had effectively attempted to end her career via “hostile takeover”.

Following her departure from the Labor Party, Bedford, as with the rest of the crossbench, continued to provide confidence and supply support to the minority Labor government. A ReachTEL poll conducted on 2 March 2017 of 606 voters in post-redistribution Florey indicated a 33.4 percent primary vote for Bedford running as an independent which would likely see the endorsed Labor candidate defeated after preferences. In December 2017, Snelling decided not to nominate for Florey, and was replaced as Labor's endorsed candidate by Rik Morris. Bedford successfully re-contested Florey as an independent at the 2018 state election, gaining a 30.6 percent first preference vote and defeating Morris on preferences.

In October 2021, Bedford announced she would move to contest the seat of Newland at the 2022 state election. She justified the move citing electoral boundary changes pushing much of her constituents into the Newland electorate for the 2022 state election. She placed third, gaining 12% of the vote, and was defeated.

Bedford contested Florey in the 2026 state election, achieving 4.8% of the primary vote in fifth place and was again defeated.

During Bedford's time in Parliament, she contributed to the House of Assembly Chamber 645 times (Motions, Bills, Speeches etc.) with 82 Contributions to Legislation (Second Readings etc.), 10 Private Bills, 3 Private Bills Passed the Parliament, 395 Grievance Debate (Motions) Speeches, and 15 Addresses in Reply speeches.

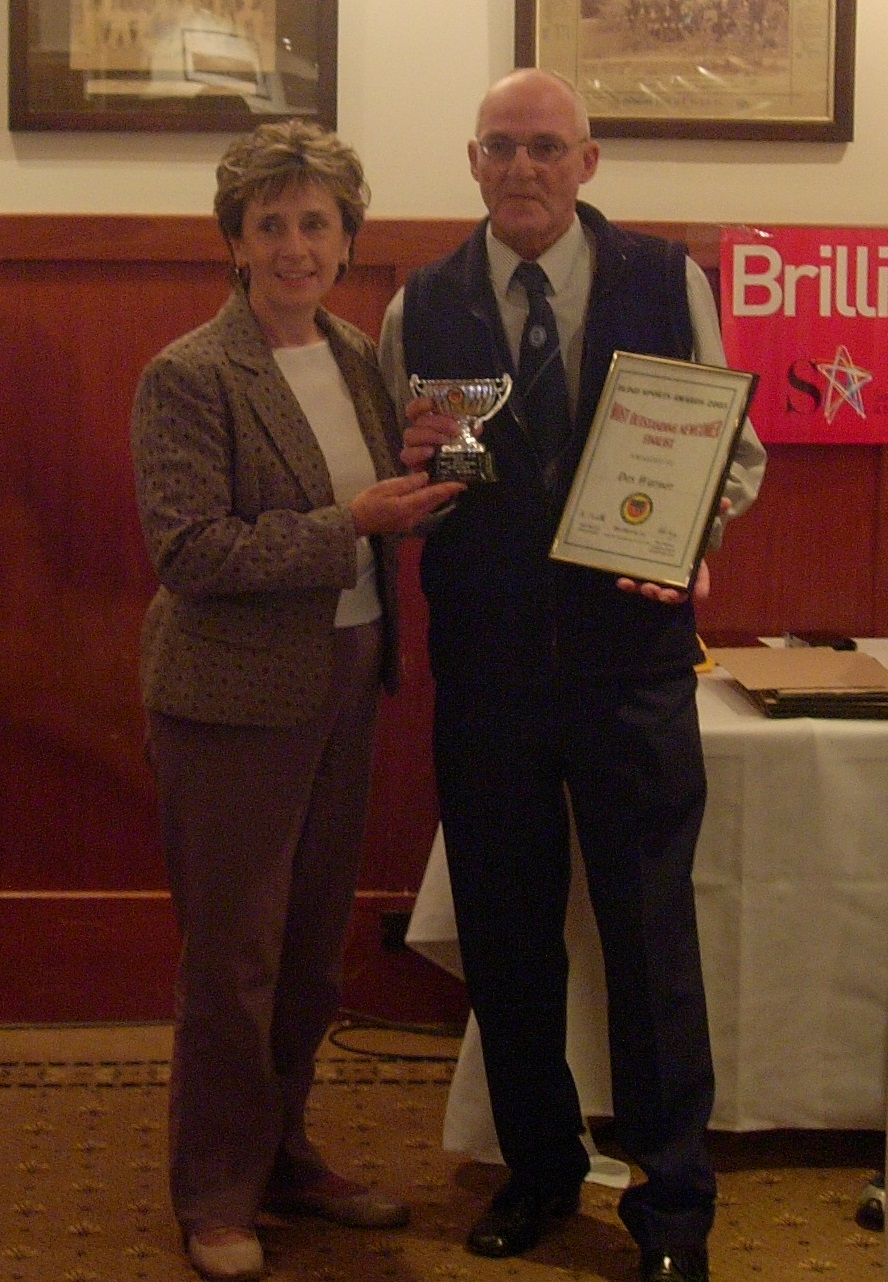
Bedford (left) presenting an award in 2006

=== Deputy Speaker (2014-2018) ===
During the final term of the Weatherill Labor Government (2014–2018), Bedford was unanimously appointed as the 43rd Deputy Speaker and Chairman of Committees by the Parliament, with the former Labor Attorney-General, Michael Atkinson, being appointed Speaker. However, in practice, Bedford was the de facto speaker, with Atkinson generally only taking the chair during opening prayers and Question Time.

=== Constitutional Reform ===
Bedford introduced ten pieces of legislation into the Parliament during her 25-year parliamentary career with three passing into law. Two significant pieces of Bedford legislation which are now law include significant constitutional and parliamentary reform:

The Parliamentary Committees (Petitions) Amendment Act 2019 (SA) made changes to state laws to allow eligible petitions by 10,000 or more signatories to be automatically referred to the state Parliament's Legislative Review Committee, who are then required to perform an inquiry, consider the petition and make an inquiry report which is tabled in the Parliament, and referred to the relevant Minister, who is then required to address the house within six sitting days on behalf of the government identifying actions to be taken concerning the matter referred into the petition.

The Constitution (Independent Speaker) Amendment Act 2021 (SA) made changes to the state's Constitution to ensure that the Parliament's Speaker was an independent or non-political party-affiliated Member of Parliament, with Bedford arguing that “Parliament must be free of any political influence, perceived or otherwise, and be beyond reproach and a beacon of best practice as it weighs and deliberates laws and amendments to legislation to present the best possible outcomes for the people of South Australia”. The law passed the Parliament with a majority of two after Bedford secured the full support of the Labor opposition and her three independent crossbench colleagues. At the time of the law's passing, there was already an independent speaker (Cregan) who continued as speaker for the remainder of the Parliament.

== Personal life ==
Bedford has lived in the Adelaide suburb of Modbury Heights since 1976, with her two children attending the Heights School.

=== Personal Causes ===
Bedford was a founding member, and society secretary, of the Muriel Matters Foundation.

South Australian House of Assembly
Preceded by Sam Bass	Member for Florey; 1997–2022	Succeeded by Michael Brown
