= John Cummins (Australian politician) =

Australian politician (born 1944)

Member of the South Australian Parliament for Norwood
- In office 11 December 1993 – 11 October 1997
- Preceded by: Greg Crafter
- Succeeded by: Vini Ciccarello

Personal details
- Born: John Gabriel Cummins; 29 December 1944
- Party: Liberal Party of Australia (SA)

John Gabriel Cummins (born 29 December 1944) is a former South Australian politician who represented the South Australian House of Assembly seat of Norwood from 1993 to 1997 for the Liberal Party.

South Australian House of Assembly
Preceded by Greg Crafter	Member for Norwood; 1993–1997	Succeeded by Vini Ciccarello
