= Sam Bass (politician) =

Australian politician (1944–2018)

Member of the South Australian House of Assembly for Florey
- In office 11 December 1993 – 10 October 1997
- Preceded by: Bob Gregory
- Succeeded by: Frances Bedford

Personal details
- Born: Rodney Piers Bass; 30 July 1944
- Died: 28 June 2018 (aged 73)
- Party: Liberal Party
- Occupation: Police officer

Rodney Piers "Sam" Bass (30 July 1944 – 28 June 2018) was an Australian politician who represented the South Australian House of Assembly seat of Florey for the Liberal Party from 1993 to 1997.

South Australian House of Assembly
Preceded by Bob Gregory	Member for Florey; 1993–1997	Succeeded by Frances Bedford
