= 1980 Norwood state by-election =

The 1980 Norwood state by-election was a by-election held on 16 February 1980 for the South Australian House of Assembly seat of Norwood.

The seat had been held by former premier and Labor MHA Don Dunstan from the 1953 state election, until his resignation in February 1979. The subsequent March 1979 by-election was won by Labor's Greg Crafter, but Crafter lost to the Liberal Party's Frank Webster at the September 1979 state election.

The 1979 state election result was overturned because the Court of Disputed Returns found that a Liberal Party advertisement in an Italian language newspaper, which described Webster as "your representative" ("il vostro deputato"), gave the false impression that Webster was the sitting member.

Therefore, a by-election was held in February 1980, and Crafter regained the seat.

== Result ==
Norwood state by-election, 16 February 1980
Party	Candidate	Votes	%	±%
Labor	Greg Crafter	7,390	48.8	+1.8
Liberal	Frank Webster	6,713	44.4	−2.5
Democrats	David D'Angelo	682	4.5	−1.6
Marijuana	Steve Dimitriou	342	2.3	+2.3
Total formal votes		15,127	97.7	+2.1
Informal votes		354	2.3	−2.1
Turnout		15,481	88.8	−3.5
Two-party-preferred result
Labor	Greg Crafter	8,026	53.1	+3.2
Liberal	Frank Webster	7,101	46.9	−3.2
Labor gain from Liberal		Swing	+3.2	

== See also ==
- List of South Australian state by-elections
