= 1979 Norwood state by-election =

South Australian by-election

The 1979 Norwood state by-election was a by-election held on 10 March 1979 for the South Australian House of Assembly seat of Norwood. This was triggered by the resignation of Premier and Labor MHA Don Dunstan. Created and first contested at the 1938 state election, the seat had been held by Dunstan since the 1953 state election.

== Results ==
Labor retained the seat on a considerably reduced majority.

Norwood state by-election, 10 March 1979
| Party | Candidate | Votes | % | ±% |
|---|---|---|---|---|
| Labor | Greg Crafter | 6,505 | 47.3 | −12.9 |
| Liberal | Frank Webster | 5,866 | 42.7 | +2.9 |
| Democrats | Liz Bullock | 761 | 5.5 | +5.5 |
| Marijuana | Steve Dimitriou | 302 | 2.2 | +2.2 |
| Independent | Howard Steele | 225 | 1.6 | +1.6 |
| Australia | Ian Modistach | 83 | 0.6 | +0.6 |
| Total formal votes | | 13,742 | 97.0 | +0.2 |
| Informal votes | | 430 | 3.0 | −0.2 |
| Turnout | | 14,172 | 84.2 | −6.3 |
Two-party-preferred result
| Labor | Greg Crafter | 7,314 | 53.2 | −7.0 |
| Liberal | Frank Webster | 6,428 | 46.8 | +7.0 |
| Labor hold | | Swing | −7.0 | |

== See also ==
- List of South Australian state by-elections
