= Charles Wells (Australian politician) =

Australian politician

Charles John Wells (9 October 1911 – 5 July 1984) was an Australian politician who represented the South Australian House of Assembly seat of Florey for the Labor Party from 1970 to 1979.

South Australian House of Assembly
New seat	Member for Florey; 1970–1979	Succeeded by Harold O'Neill
