= Don Ferguson (South Australian politician) =

Australian politician

Donald Mervyn Ferguson (7 August 1936 – 9 March 2013) was an Australian politician who represented the South Australian House of Assembly seat of Henley Beach from 1982 to 1993 for the Labor Party. He was Deputy Speaker of the House of Assembly and Chairman of Committees from 1986 to 1990 and 1992 to 1993

Parliament of South Australia
Preceded by Bob Randall	Member for Henley Beach; 1982–1993	Seat abolished
