= Bob Gregory (politician) =

Australian politician

Robert John Gregory (born 23 September 1936) was an Australian politician who represented the South Australian House of Assembly seat of Florey for the Labor Party from 1982 to 1993.

South Australian House of Assembly
| Preceded by Harold O'Neill | Member for Florey; 1982–1993 | Succeeded by Sam Bass |
Political offices
| Preceded by Don Hopgood | Chief Secretary of South Australia; 1989 | Ministry abolished |
