= Greg Crafter =

Australian politician (born 1944)

Greg Crafter AO
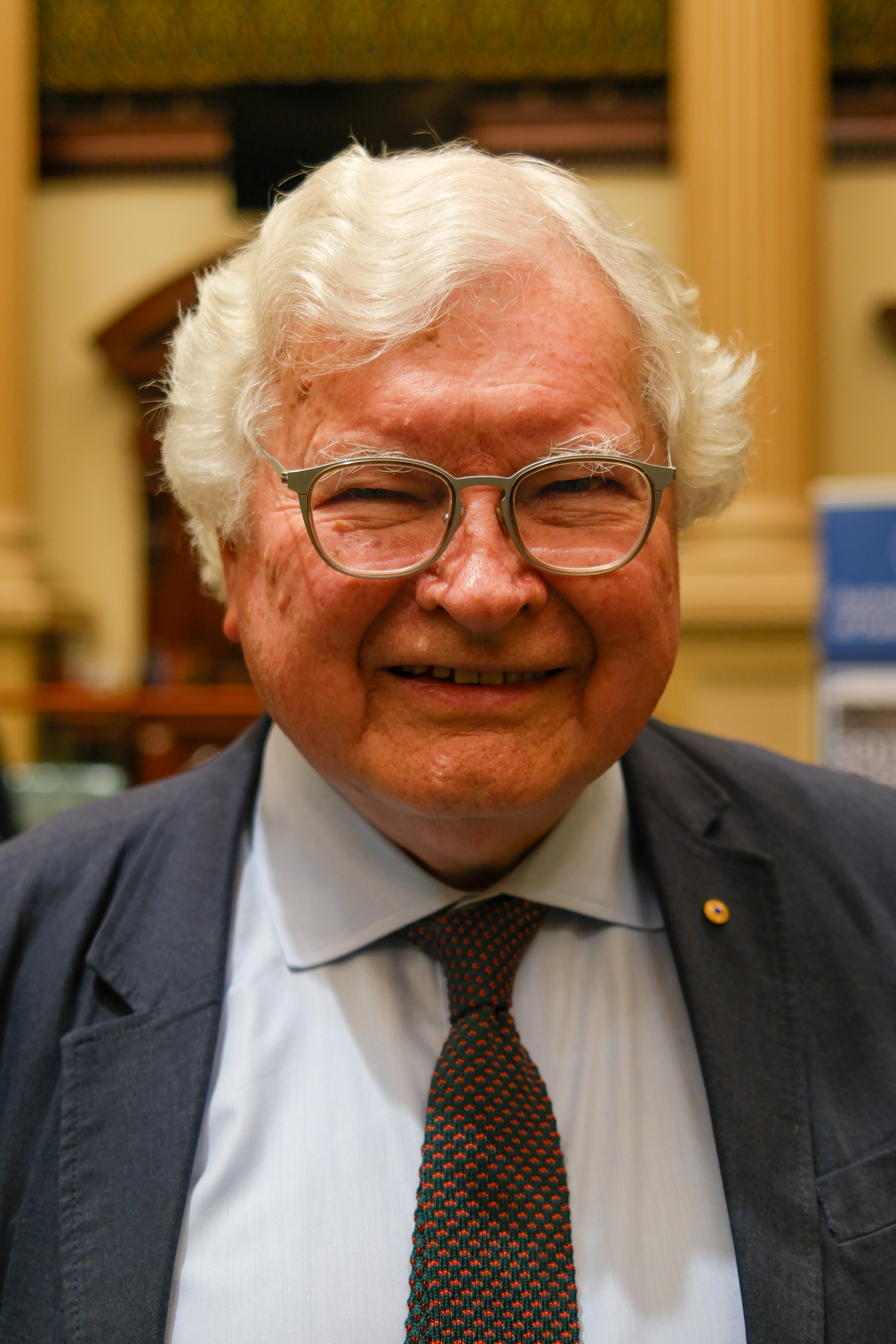
- Crafter at Parliament House in 2026

Minister of Education
- In office 18 December 1985 – 1 October 1992
- Premier: John Bannon; Lynn Arnold
- Preceded by: Lynn Arnold
- Succeeded by: Susan Lenehan

Minister of Housing, Urban Development and Local Government Relations
- In office 1 October 1992 – 14 December 1993

Minister of Aboriginal Affairs
- In office 10 November 1982 – 20 April 1989

Minister of Community Welfare
- In office 10 November 1982 – 18 December 1985

Member for Norwood
- In office 16 February 1980 – 11 December 1993
- Preceded by: Frank Webster
- Succeeded by: John Cummins
- In office 10 March 1979 – 18 September 1979
- Preceded by: Don Dunstan
- Succeeded by: Frank Webster

Personal details
- Born: Gregory John Crafter; 16 September 1944 (age 82)
- Party: Labor
- Spouse: Rae Hurley (m. 1973)
- Children: 2
- Education: Gawler High School; Woodville High School
- Alma mater: University of Adelaide (LLB)
- Profession: Lawyer

Gregory John Crafter AO GCSG (born 16 September 1944) is a former South Australian Labor Party politician. He was the member for Norwood from 1979 to 1993, with a short break from September 1979 to February 1980.

Crafter was elected in a March 1979 by-election triggered by the abrupt resignation of Premier Don Dunstan, the member for Norwood since 1953. Only six months later, however, he was turned out of office by Liberal Frank Webster as Labor lost government in the September 1979 state election. However, Supreme Court of South Australia sitting as a Court of Disputed Returns overturned Webster's win due to a Liberal Party advertisement in an Italian language newspaper describing described Webster as "your representative" ("il vostro deputato"). The court found that the ad gave the false impression that Webster, not Crafter, was the sitting member. Crafter contested a February 1980 by-election for his old seat and won, reducing the Liberals' already wafer-thin majority to one seat. This time, Crafter held the seat until his defeat in 1993.

Crafter held a number of ministerial positions under John Bannon and Lynn Arnold, including Minister for Education and Minister for Local Government.

After his parliamentary career, Crafter worked as a registered political lobbyist in South Australia, acting as Greg Crafter Consulting. He also served as National Catholic Education Commission chairman.

South Australian House of Assembly
Preceded by Don Dunstan	Member for Norwood; 1979	Succeeded by Frank Webster
Preceded by Frank Webster	Member for Norwood; 1980–1993	Succeeded by John Cummins
