= Bob Randall (politician) =

Australian politician

Member of the South Australian Parliament for Henley Beach
- In office 15 September 1979 – 5 November 1982
- Preceded by: Glen Broomhill
- Succeeded by: Don Ferguson

Personal details
- Party: Family First (2008-2017)
- Other political affiliations: Liberal (1979–1993, 2003–2008); Independent (1993–1998); Christian Democrats (1998–2003)

Robert John Randall is an Australian politician. Randall was the Liberal MP for the South Australian House of Assembly seat of Henley Beach from 1979 to 1982. Randall was also Liberal State President from 2003 to 2005, and a former Liberal Mayor of Henley and Grange Council. He held membership, c. 1998, with the Christian Democrats. Since 2008 he has held membership with Family First.

== Politics ==
Randall first contested the since-abolished seat of Henley Beach as a Liberal at the 1977 election. Randall won the seat as a Liberal at the 1979 election and from the 1980 Norwood by-election Randall was the one-term Tonkin Liberal government's most marginal seat holder on a one percent margin before losing the seat at the 1982 election. He again contested the seat as a Liberal at the 1989 election. The seat of Colton was created at the 1991 redistribution to replace the abolished seat of Henley Beach. Randall once again contested Liberal preselection, this time for the 1993 election, but was defeated by preselection winner Steve Condous who went on to win the seat. Randall contested Colton as an independent.

Randall was the lead Christian Democrat candidate for South Australia in the Senate at the 1998 federal election.

Randall later left the Christian Democrats and again became a Liberal, serving from 2003 to 2005 as South Australian Liberal State President. Randall was the seventh and last Liberal candidate for the South Australian Legislative Council at the 2006 election.

After joining Family First in 2008, Randall claimed the Liberals had "moved so far to the left that we don't recognise it any more". Randall was the second Family First candidate for the Legislative Council at the 2010 election, the Family First candidate for the seat of Hindmarsh at both the 2010 federal election and 2013 federal election and the Family First candidate for the state seat of Morphett at the 2014 election.

Parliament of South Australia
Preceded by Glen Broomhill	Member for Henley Beach; 1979–1982	Succeeded by Don Ferguson
