= Glen Broomhill =

Australian politician

The Honourable Glen Broomhill

Minister of Environment and Conservation
- In office 20 November 1970 – 16 October 1975
- Preceded by: office established
- Succeeded by: Don Simmons

Minister of Labor and Industry
- In office 2 June 1970 – 19 November 1970
- Preceded by: Robin Millhouse
- Succeeded by: Dave McKee

Member of the South Australian House of Assembly
- In office 6 March 1965 – 14 September 1979
- Preceded by: Fred Walsh
- Succeeded by: Bob Randall
- Constituency: West Torrens (1965-1970); Henley Beach (1970-1979)

Personal details
- Born: Glen Raymond Broomhill; 20 January 1933 Adelaide, South Australia, Australia
- Died: 26 December 2007 (aged 74) Adelaide, South Australia, Australia
- Party: Labor Party
- Spouse: Jill Broomhill (née Coles)
- Children: Jan Hammond, Juile Hill, Greg Broomhill

Glen Raymond Broomhill (20 January 1933 – 26 December 2007) was an Australian politician who represented the South Australian House of Assembly seats of West Torrens from 1965 to 1970 and Henley Beach from 1970 to 1979 for the Labor Party. Broomhill's most enduring influence was as the architect of South Australia's container-deposit legislation, which focused heavily on environmental awareness.

== Early life ==
Glen Raymond Broomhill was born in Adelaide on 20 January 1933. Broomhill was educated at Richmond Primary School and Goodwood Boys Technical School. Broomhill also played Colts football for Glenelg Football Club.

== Early career ==
Broomhill started his career as a Dental Technician when he was 16 During this time he was closely involved with the Australian Labor Party. Broomhill also became involved in the trade union movement, and in 1956 he was elected as an organiser of the South Australian branch of the Federal Miscellaneous Workers Union.

== Political career ==
In 1965, Broomhill won a seat in parliament representing the Electorate district of West Torrens. Broomhill was largely supported by his uncle, the former senator and Labor Party stalwart, Jim Toohey. He also received backing from the federal member for Hindmarsh, Clyde Cameron.

In his maiden speech he criticised legislation that meant citizens under the age of 30 were ineligible to take up a seat in the Legislative Council.

The year after his election, Broomhill was appointed as government whip, holding this position until 1970. Alongside Don Dunstan, the ministry included Des Corcoran, Len King, Hugh Hudson and Geoff Virgo, amongst others. Broomhill was initially appointed minister for labour and industry. He would later be appointed minister for conservation and minister assisting the premier.

Over a five-year ministerial career, Broomhill held a range of portfolios, including fisheries, planning and development, community welfare and tourism. In 1973, he became the state's first minister for recreation and sport. During his tenure as a minister, Broomhill introduced a series of initiatives, including the establishment of the Coast Protection Board, and a large increase in the areas of national parks and river wetlands. He oversaw the establishment of a quarry levy and measures to improve the appearance of the Adelaide Hills face zone.

Broomhill was also involved in legislation surrounding population growth. He was a passionate supporter of the proposed development at Monarto, in addition to being the architect of that project. The Monarto scheme was later discontinued.

Broomhill's major legacy was the introduction of the container deposit legislation completed in 1975 that saw cans and bottles reduced drastically as a source of litter across the state. This legislation significantly increased the recovery rate of beverage containers in this state, where around 80 per cent of glass bottles are recovered compared with around 36 per cent nationally, and reduced annual greenhouse gas emissions by up to 70,000 tonnes of carbon dioxide equivalent. The scheme is estimated to produce embodied water savings of up to 5 megalitres per year.

Broomhill announced his retirement from politics at the 1979 election, having stood down from the ministry in 1975 because of his wife's failing health.

Broomhill would go on to serve on the board of Multiple Sclerosis South Australia and the Northern Territory, the board of ETSA, and as deputy chairman of the power line environment committee.

Broomhill died in 2007.

Political offices
Preceded by Robin Millhouse	Minister for Labour and Industry; 1970	Succeeded by Dave McKee
New title	Minister Assisting the Premier; 1970–1973	Succeeded by Don Hopgood
New title	Minister for Conservation; 1970–1971	Succeeded by Himself as Minister for Environment and Conservation
Preceded by Himself as Minister for Conservation	Minister for Environment and Conservation; 1971–1975	Succeeded by Himself as Minister for the Environment
Preceded by Glen Broomhill	Minister for Recreation and Sport; 1973–1975	Vacant Title next held by John Bannon (1979)
Preceded by Hugh Hudson	Minister for Fisheries; 1973–1975	Succeeded by Brian Chatterton
Preceded by Himself as Minister for Environment and Conservation	Minister for the Environment; 1975	Succeeded by Don Simmons
New title	Minister for Planning and Development; 1975	Succeeded by Hugh Hudson as Minister for Planning
Preceded by Len King	Minister of Community Welfare; 1975	Succeeded by Ron Payne
Preceded by Don Hopgood	Minister Assisting the Premier; 1975	Succeeded by Don Simmons
Parliament of South Australia
Preceded by Fred Walsh	Member for West Torrens; 1965–1970	Seat abolished
New seat	Member for Henley Beach; 1970–1979	Succeeded by Bob Randall
