= Electoral district of Florey =

South Australian state electoral district

Florey South Australia—House of Assembly
- Interactive map of electoral district boundaries from the 2022 state election (Note: The electorate will have no change in boundaries at the 2026 state election.)
- State: South Australia
- Created: 1970
- MP: Michael Brown
- Party: Labor
- Namesake: Howard Florey
- Electors: 26,335 (2026)
- Area: 25.7 km^{2} (9.9 sq mi)
- Demographic: Metropolitan
- Coordinates: 34°49′00″S 138°40′00″E
Electorates around Florey:
Port Adelaide	Playford	Ramsay
Port Adelaide	Florey	Wright
Enfield	Torrens	Newland

Florey is a single-member electoral district for the South Australian House of Assembly. It is named after scientist Howard Florey, who was responsible for the development of penicillin. It is a suburban electorate in Adelaide's Metropolitan north, taking in the suburbs of Ingle Farm, Parafield, Para Hills, Para Hills West, Para Vista, Pooraka, as well as parts of Mawson Lakes.

== History ==
Florey was created at the electoral redistribution of 1969 as a notionally safe Labor electorate, and was first contested at the 1970 election. Mostly it was safely held by the Labor party until the 1989 election when it became the minority Labor government's most marginal electorate. Florey was one of the first electorates to fall to the Liberals at the 1993 election landslide. It was regained by Labor's Frances Bedford at the 1997 election.

At the 2014 Election it was Electorate based on the north eastern Adelaide Metropolitan suburbs of Modbury, Modbury North, Modbury Heights and parts of Gillies Plains, Hope Valley, Para Hills, Para Vista, Redwood Park, Rigdehaven, Vallev View and Wynn Vale.

== 2016 electoral redistribution and 2018 election ==
The 2016 electoral redistribution reassigned two-thirds of Playford voters to Florey as the electorate moved westerly away from it traditional base area in the north eastern suburbs within the City of Tea Tree Gully (as at 2026 now in the Electorate of Newland).

Incumbent Frances Bedford resigned from Labor and became an independent on 28 March 2017 after Labor's Jack Snelling, the sitting member for the Electoral district of Playford since 1997, won Florey pre-selection for the 2018 election. As an independent, Bedford continued to provide confidence and supply support to the incumbent Labor government and did not make an immediate decision as to whether she would re-contest Florey as an independent.

A ReachTEL poll conducted on 2 March 2017 of 606 voters in post-redistribution Florey indicated a 33.4 percent primary vote for Bedford running as an independent which would likely see Labor's Snelling defeated after preferences.

Snelling announced on 17 September 2017 that he had decided not to contest the 2018 election. At the 2018 election Florey was subsequently retained by Bedford which was the first time an independent candidate had won an election in the district since its inception.

== 2022 election ==
At the 2022 Bedford switch seats and contested Newland as an independent and Florey was regained for Labor by Michael Brown. Brown had switch seats to Florey after succeeding Snelling as the member for Playford in 2018 due to an electoral boundaries redistribution, which saw around 12,000 voters in the suburbs of Para Hills, Para Hills West, and Parafield move from Playford to Florey in 2022

== Members for Florey ==
Member	Party	Term
Charles Wells	Labor	1970–1979
Harold O'Neill	Labor	1979–1982
Bob Gregory	Labor	1982–1993
Sam Bass	Liberal	1993–1997
Frances Bedford	Labor	1997–2017
Frances Bedford	Independent	2017–2022
Michael Brown	Labor	2022–present

== Election results ==
2026 South Australian state election: Florey
Party	Candidate	Votes	%	±%
Labor	Michael Brown	10,376	47.3	−1.6
One Nation	Riley Size	5,038	23.0	+23.0
Greens	Alexandra McGee	2,344	10.7	+0.4
Liberal	Denise George	2,054	9.4	−19.0
Independent	Frances Bedford	1,059	4.8	+4.8
Family First	Mark Hawke	707	3.2	−3.2
Australian Family	Dieter Fischer	206	0.9	+0.9
Fair Go	Robert Jameson	87	0.4	+0.4
United Voice	Trent Wilton	65	0.3	+0.3
Total formal votes		21,936	94.4	−1.5
Informal votes		1,292	5.6	+1.5
Turnout		23,228	88.2	+0.4
Two-candidate-preferred result
Labor	Michael Brown	14,505	66.1	+3.3
One Nation	Riley Size	7,431	33.9	+33.9
Labor hold				
