= Court of disputed returns =

Judicial body for resolving electoral disputes in common law countries

A court of disputed returns is a court, tribunal, or some other body that determines disputes about elections in some common law countries. The court may be known by another name such as 'court of disputed elections'.

In countries that derive their legal tradition from the United Kingdom, the legal tradition is that Parliament is the supreme law-making body in the country. The same tradition mandates that as Parliament is sovereign, it alone has authority and jurisdiction to determine who and how a person can be elected to Parliament. Implicit in that authority is the jurisdiction to determine whether a person has been validly elected, which is commonly known as a "disputed return" and gives the court its name. The court is an attempt to eliminate the partisan nature of parliament and give the determination of electoral disputes to an independent and dispassionate neutral body. As parliament has the sole authority to determine these matters, parliament must create a special law to bring that body into existence to determine those disputes.

A court of disputed returns may be constituted in a number of ways. The first is by the creation of a special court to perform that function. That has occurred in the Northern Territory, Australia, which has a special and separate court determines those disputes.

Another method is for an existing court to be given the role of adjudicating election disputes. The High Court of Australia, the Supreme Court of New South Wales and the Supreme Court of Victoria are each invested as courts of disputed returns in this manner; when handling relevant cases, they sit under the name Court of Disputed Returns. A court may also have the power to handle election disputes without being designated as the Court of Disputed Returns as such, though performing much the same function.

In some jurisdictions, the principle of Parliamentary sovereignty means that the legislature itself retains the ultimate authority to handle election disputes; notwithstanding the fact that this authority may be delegated to the Court, Parliament holds the right to overrule it.

Generally courts of disputed return have no rights of appeal, but that depends on the law that constitutes the court.

== History ==
Prior to 1405, there was no codified process for resolving electoral disputes. Those disputes were resolved through what is described by authors Graeme Orr and George Williams as "custom, force and administrative action". This meant that there were no real rules in place to determine how these disputes were resolved. The manner of resolving a dispute in one county might be totally different from another county, or may result in a different outcome even if the same procedure was followed.

The first laws to regulate elections in England were passed in the reign of Henry IV. This was through the Election of Knights of Shires Act 1405 (7 Hen. 4 c. 15). The law came about due to the confusion caused when letters were purportedly issued disqualifying lawyers from voting or being elected. The Electors of Knights of the Shires Act 1429 (8 Hen. 6. c. 7) was passed allowing the common law courts to become involved in the determination of these disputes. In the 16th century, it was commonly regarded that the Court of Chancery could determine electoral disputes, particularly as that court issued the various writs to the sheriff and compiled their returns on the election.

During the reign of Elizabeth I, the election for Norfolk was disputed in 1586. The Court of Chancery investigated and decided to issue writs for a new election. However, the House of Commons set up its own committee which upheld the election. In 1604, during the reign of James I, a dispute arose as to the election of Sir Francis Goodwin for the seat of Buckinghamshire. The Court of Chancery investigated and determined that a new election should occur. However, the House of Commons established its own committee and found that Goodwin was validly elected. A compromise was made between the king and the house by holding a fresh election.

From the early 17th century, the resolution of disputed returns became accepted as being the prerogative of Parliament. The Court of Chancery then became the means of administering the election process, but Parliament became the arbiter of disputes.

By the 18th century, the process of Parliament determining disputes became tainted. The holding of a seat in Parliament became very valuable. Voting in Parliament had consolidated into voting along party lines. Issues were determined according to the numbers rather than the merits. The Parliamentary Elections Act 1770 (10 Geo. 3. c. 16) established a jury system to reform the process but that process did not satisfactorily resolve the problem.

In 1868 Parliament handed its power to determine disputes to the common law courts. Orr and Williams describe this as a "hot potato" that the courts reluctantly took on. The power was given to two judges of the Queen's Bench. It was described as being "what, according to British ideas, are normally the rights and privileges of the Assembly itself, always jealously maintained and guarded in complete independence of the Crown."

== Australia ==
In most states, the Court of Disputed Returns is the supreme court of that state.

=== Federal ===
The High Court of Australia is the Court of Disputed Returns for national elections in Australia. See section 354 of the Commonwealth Electoral Act 1918 (Cth).

=== Australian Capital Territory ===
In the Australian Capital Territory, the Supreme Court is known as the Court of Disputed Elections for the purposes of the Electoral Act 1992 (ACT).

=== New South Wales ===
In New South Wales, Supreme Court shall be the Court of Disputed Returns under the Parliamentary Electorates and Elections Act 1912 for state elections. For elections of officers to Aboriginal Land Councils under the Aboriginal Land Rights Act 1983 (NSW), or a Rural Lands Board under the Rural Lands Protection Act 1998, the Land and Environment Court acts to consider disputed returns.

=== Northern Territory ===
The Northern Territory has established the Court of Disputed Returns under the Electoral Act 2004 (NT) as a separate court to determine these disputes.

=== Queensland ===
A dispute about an election may be made by petition to the Supreme Court sitting as the Court of Disputed Returns under the Electoral Act 1992 (Qld).

=== South Australia ===
In South Australia, the Supreme Court is the Court of Disputed Returns under the Electoral Act 1985 (SA).

For local government elections, there is a Court of Disputed Returns constituted under which a District Court judge may be appointed.

=== Victoria ===
The Supreme Court of Victoria is the Court of Disputed Returns under the Electoral Act 2002 (Vic).

=== Western Australia ===
For state elections Section 157 of the Electoral Act (WA) provides that the validity of any election or return may be disputed by petition addressed to the Court of Disputed Returns. The court is constituted by a judge of the Supreme Court of Western Australia sitting in open Court.

For local government elections, the Magistrates Court is the Court of Disputed Returns under the Local Government Act 1995 (WA).

== Fiji ==
The High Court of Fiji is the Court of Disputed Returns for the Island of Fiji under section 73 of the Constitution (Amendment) Act 1997.

== Hong Kong ==
In Hong Kong, electoral legislations establish that the Court of First Instance of the territory's High Court (previously the High Court of Justice of the Supreme Court) would hear election petitions. The sole exception would be selection of the territory's Chief Executive after 1997: Such petitions would directly be heard by the Court of Final Appeal as provided for in the Chief Executive Election Ordinance 2001.

== New Zealand ==
The power to determine electoral disputes was transferred to the courts in 1880 by the Election Petitions Act 1880. Before this, disputes were determined by the Parliament. The change arose through two different election results on identical petitions.

== Papua New Guinea ==
Questions on electoral disputes are referred to the National Court of Papua New Guinea under the Organic Law on National and Local-level Government Elections 2003 (PNG).

== Brazil ==
Brazil's Superior Electoral Court, despite not descending from the English common-law tradition which gives rise to the Courts of Disputed Returns elsewhere, is responsible for managing electoral disputes, in addition to its role as the national electoral authority. Unlike most other courts of disputed returns, it is a permanent body with separate justices; moreover, it has substantially greater powers.

== See also ==
- Category:Election law in the United Kingdom
- Election law

== Sources ==
- Orr, G & Williams, G. "Electoral Challenges: Judicial Review of Parliamentary Elections in Australia". (2001) 23 Sydney Law Review 53.
- Walker, K. "Disputed Returns and Parliamentary Qualifications: Is the High Court's Jurisdiction Constitutional". (1997) 20 University of NSW Law Journal 257
- Geiringer, C. "Judging the Politicians: A Case for Judicial Determination of Disputes over the Membership of the House of Representatives" (PDF). (2005) 3 New Zealand Journal of Public and International Law 139
- McGrath, Amy (1997). "Chapter Seven "One Vote, One Value : Electoral Fraud in Australia". Proceedings of the Eighth Conference of The Samuel Griffith Society. Archived from the original on 13 October 2009.
