= Frank Webster (politician) =

Australian politician

Member of the South Australian House of Assembly for Norwood
- In office 15 September 1979 – 22 January 1980
- Preceded by: Don Dunstan
- Succeeded by: Greg Crafter

Personal details
- Born: Frank Raymond Webster Wyndham, WA
- Party: SA Liberal Party

Frank Raymond Webster was a retired Australian politician who represented the South Australian House of Assembly seat of Norwood from 1979 to 1980 for the Liberal Party.

His win at the 1979 State election was overturned by the Court of Disputed Returns, which found that a Liberal Party advertisement in an Italian language newspaper, describing Webster as "your representative" ("il vostro deputato"), gave the false impression that Webster was the sitting member. Webster lost the subsequent by-election.

South Australian House of Assembly
Preceded by Don Dunstan	Member for Norwood; 1979–1980	Succeeded by Greg Crafter
