= Electoral district of Henley Beach =

State electoral district of South Australia

Henley Beach South Australia—House of Assembly
- State: South Australia
- Created: 1970
- Abolished: 1993
- Namesake: Henley Beach, South Australia
- Demographic: Metropolitan
- Coordinates: 34°55′S 138°30′E

Henley Beach was an electoral district of the House of Assembly in the Australian state of South Australia from 1970 to 1993.

Henley Beach was abolished in a boundary redistribution in 1993, superseded by the electoral district of Colton.

== Members ==
| Member | Party | Term |
|---|---|---|
| Glen Broomhill | Labor | 1970–1979 |
| Bob Randall | Liberal | 1979–1982 |
| Don Ferguson | Labor | 1982–1993 |
