= Electoral district of Norwood =

State electoral district of South Australia

Norwood South Australia—House of Assembly
- State: South Australia
- Created: 1938
- Abolished: 2014
- Namesake: Norwood, South Australia
- Demographic: Metropolitan

Norwood is a former electoral district of the House of Assembly in the Australian state of South Australia. It was a 14.2 km² inner-urban electorate in Adelaide and was named after the inner-eastern suburb of Norwood. In its final configuration, the seat also included the suburbs of Beulah Park, College Park, Evandale, Firle, Hackney, Joslin, Kent Town, Marden, Maylands, Payneham South, Royston Park, St Morris, St Peters, Stepney, Trinity Gardens and Vale Park, as well as parts of Kensington, Klemzig and Payneham.

Norwood was created as an electoral district in 1938, and was usually a marginal seat, changing hands between the Labor Party and the Liberal Party (and the Liberals' predecessor, the Liberal and Country League) a number of times. The electorate is synonymous with former Premier of South Australia Don Dunstan, who held the seat from 1953 until 1979.

In 1979 and 1980, Norwood voters went to the ballot box three times within 12 months; first at the March 1979 by-election following Dunstan's resignation, then the September 1979 state election, and again at the February 1980 by-election which resulted from a court decision invalidating the election result. That by-election reduced the Tonkin government's already precarious two-seat majority to a knife-edge of one seat.

From 1979 until 1993 (with a short break from September 1979 to February 1980), the seat was held by prominent Labor minister Greg Crafter, who is now Australian head of the International Baccalaureate Organization and the University of Adelaide alumni organisation. In the shadow of the collapse of the State Bank of South Australia, the Liberals, through John Cummins, reclaimed the seat at the 1993 state election in a landslide. Cummins was defeated by Labor's Vini Ciccarello at the 1997 state election with a 1.5% margin. At the 2002 state election, the margin was whittled down to 0.5% but was increased to 4.2% at the 2006 state election. Ciccarello was defeated in the 2010 state election by Liberal candidate Steven Marshall, following a large swing, which was the first time that Labor had been in government without holding the seat of Norwood.

The Electoral Commission of South Australia's 2012 redistribution included renaming the seat to Dunstan which took effect from 15 March 2014.

== Members for Norwood ==
| Member | Party | Term |
|---|---|---|
| Frank Nieass | Labor | 1938–1941 |
| Roy Moir | Liberal and Country | 1941–1944 |
| Frank Nieass | Labor | 1944–1947 |
| Roy Moir | Liberal and Country | 1947–1953 |
| Don Dunstan | Labor | 1953–1979 |
| Greg Crafter | Labor | 1979–1979 |
| Frank Webster | Liberal | 1979–1980 |
| Greg Crafter | Labor | 1980–1993 |
| John Cummins | Liberal | 1993–1997 |
| Vini Ciccarello | Labor | 1997–2010 |
| Steven Marshall | Liberal | 2010–2014 |
