= Harold O'Neill =

Australian politician

Harold Howard O'Neill (12 October 1928 – 30 October 1983) was an Australian politician who represented the South Australian House of Assembly seat of Florey for the Labor Party from 1979 to 1982.

South Australian House of Assembly
| Preceded by Charles Wells | Member for Florey; 1979–1982 | Succeeded by Bob Gregory |
