= Candidates of the 1982 South Australian state election =

The 1982 South Australian state election was held on 6 November 1982.

== Retiring Members ==
=== Labor ===
- Des Corcoran MHA (Hartley)
- Gil Langley MHA (Unley)

=== Liberal ===
- Keith Russack MHA (Goyder)
- John Carnie MLC
- Boyd Dawkins MLC
- Don Laidlaw MLC

== House of Assembly ==
Sitting members are shown in bold text. Successful candidates are highlighted in the relevant colour. Where there is possible confusion, an asterisk (*) is also used.

Electorate	Held by	Labor candidate	Liberal candidate	Democrats candidate	Other candidates
Adelaide	Labor	**Jack Wright**	Terry McClean	Catherine Hannaford	
Albert Park	Labor	**Kevin Hamilton**	Graham Ingerson	Ben Michael	
Alexandra	Liberal	Helen McSkimming	**Ted Chapman**	Andrew Mills	Rex Tilbrook (Nat)
Ascot Park	Labor	**John Trainer**	Chris Gellie	Michael Rogers	
Baudin	Labor	**Don Hopgood**	Deane Clough	Ivor Childs	
Bragg	Liberal	Neill Lean	**David Tonkin**	Guy Harley	
Brighton	Liberal	June Appleby	**Dick Glazbrook**	Bob Ralph	
Chaffey	Liberal	Roland Telfer	**Peter Arnold**	Mike Elliott	
Coles	Liberal	Rosalie McDonald	**Jennifer Adamson**	Stephen Swift	
Davenport	Liberal	Emanuel Frossinakis	**Dean Brown**	Merilyn Pedrick	
Elizabeth	Labor	**Peter Duncan**	Esmond McKeown	Barbara Barlow	
Eyre	Liberal	Christina Phillis	**Graham Gunn**		
Fisher	Liberal	Annice Vass	**Stan Evans**	John Coulter	
Flinders	National	Terrence Krieg	Rex Mader	Helen Breakey	**Peter Blacker** (Nat)
Florey	Labor	**Bob Gregory**	Philip Bayly	Andrew Sickerdick	
Gilles	Labor	**Jack Slater**	Gregory Minuzzo	Eileen Farmer	
Glenelg	Liberal	Robert Dancer	**John Mathwin**	Ronald Moulds	
Goyder	Liberal	Stephan Oulianoff	John Meier	Kevin Jones	Terence Halford (Nat)
Hanson	Liberal	Derek Robertson	**Heini Becker**	Clifford Boyd	
Hartley	Labor	Terry Groom	Barry James	George Belperio	
Henley Beach	Liberal	Don Ferguson	**Bob Randall**	Trevor Turner	
Kavel	Liberal	Geoffrey Anderson	**Roger Goldsworthy**	Brian Fain	
Light	Liberal	William Young	**Bruce Eastick**	Nicholas Wedge	
Mallee	Liberal	Norman Napper	**Peter Lewis**	Samuel Pope	Guy Wheal (Nat)
Mawson	Liberal	Susan Lenehan	**Ivar Schmidt**	Jay McMerrick	
Mitcham	Democrats	John Hill	Stephen Baker	**Heather Southcott**	
Mitchell	Labor	**Ron Payne**	David Phelps	Kevin Whitby	
Morphett	Liberal	Stephen Blight	**John Oswald**	Graham Pamount	
Mount Gambier	Liberal	Kenneth Bonython	**Harold Allison**	Meg Lees	
Murray	Liberal	Geoffrey McCulloch	**David Wotton**	Gerhard Weissmann	
Napier	Labor	**Terry Hemmings**	Eric Bates	John Ferguson	
Newland	Liberal	John Klunder	**Brian Billard**	Robert Mason	Glen Stevens (Nat)
Norwood	Labor	**Greg Crafter**	Lynton Crosby	Josephine Read	
Peake	Labor	**Keith Plunkett**	Laurie Whitelaw	Jim Mitchell	
Playford	Labor	**Terry McRae**	Bill Arnold	Colin Nieass	
Price	Labor	**George Whitten**	Sue Crew		
Rocky River	Liberal	Denis Crisp	**John Olsen**	Gordon Weber	John Reilly (Nat)
Ross Smith	Labor	**John Bannon**	Ruth Squire		
Salisbury	Labor	**Lynn Arnold**	Derrick Rich	David Vigor	
Semaphore	Independent	Peter Bicknell	Macleay Lawrie	Peter Gagliardi	**Norm Peterson** (Ind)
Spence	Labor	**Roy Abbott**	Elizabeth Bronisz		
Stuart	Labor	**Gavin Keneally**	Sydney Cheesman	David Chapman	
Todd	Liberal	John Lewis	**Scott Ashenden**	Sandra Kanck	Rex Senior (Nat)
Torrens	Liberal	Mike Duigan	**Michael Wilson**	Joseph Zingarelli	
Unley	Labor	Kym Mayes	Robert Nicholls	Margaret-Ann Williams	Allan Osmond (Nat)
Victoria	Liberal	Simon Bryant	**Allan Rodda**	Peter Butcher	Geoffrey Clothier (Nat)
Whyalla	Labor	**Max Brown**	Vivienne Cruickshank	Mary Good	Peter Murphy (Ind)

== Legislative Council ==
Sitting members are shown in bold text. Tickets that elected at least one MLC are highlighted in the relevant colour. Successful candidates are identified by an asterisk (*). Eleven seats were up for election. The Labor Party was defending six seats, although sitting MLC Norm Foster was running as an independent. The Liberal Party was defending five seats.

Labor candidates	Liberal candidates	Democrats candidates	National candidates	Communist candidates	Group F candidates	Other candidates
1. **Chris Sumner***; 2. **Anne Levy***; 3. **John Cornwall***; 4. **Frank Blevins***; 5. John Phillips; 6. **Mario Feleppa***; 7. Colleen Hutchison; 8. Terry Roberts; 9. Michael Marinos; 10. Myles McCallum; 11. Kenneth Case	1. **Murray Hill***; 2. **Martin Cameron***; 3. Diana Laidlaw*; 4. Peter Dunn*; 5. Bruce Edwards; 6. Kent Andrew; 7. Rob Lucas*	1. Ian Gilfillan*; 2. Donald Chisholm; 3. Peter Adamson; 4. John Longhurst; 5. Carolyn Tan; 6. Robert Manhire; 7. Raymond Buttery; 8. Patricia Shortridge; 9. Doone Lee; 10. Martin Holt; 11. Stuart Brasted	1. Warwick Dunkley; 2. Pamela Ross; 3. Robin Dixon-Thompson; 4. Raymond Farrelly	1. Peter Murphy; 2. Alan Bone	1. **Norm Foster**; 2. Graham Jamieson	Ted Dunstan (Ind); Mark Eckermann (Ind); Charmaine Rogers (Libt)
