= Results of the 1982 South Australian state election (House of Assembly) =

South Australian state election, 6 November 1982 House of Assembly << 1979–1985 >>
Enrolled voters	871,235				
Votes cast	811,783		Turnout	93.18	+0.14
Informal votes	46,921		Informal	5.78	+1.35
Summary of votes by party
Party	Primary votes	%	Swing	Seats	Change
Labor	353,999	46.28	+5.43	24	+ 5
Liberal	326,372	42.67	–5.27	21	– 4
Democrats	54,457	7.12	–1.18	0	–1
National	17,782	2.32	+0.42	1	± 0
Independent	12,252	1.60	+0.60	1	± 0
Total	764,862			47	
Two-party-preferred
Labor	389,625	50.94	+5.94		
Liberal	375,237	49.06	–5.94		

This is a list of House of Assembly results for the 1982 South Australian state election.

== Results by electoral district ==
=== Adelaide ===
1982 South Australian state election: Adelaide
Party	Candidate	Votes	%	±%
Labor	Jack Wright	7,888	60.6	+6.1
Liberal	Terry McClean	3,822	29.4	−3.6
Democrats	Catherine Hannaford	1,295	10.0	−1.3
Total formal votes		13,005	90.6	−2.8
Informal votes		1,356	9.4	+2.8
Turnout		14,361	88.9	−0.8
Two-party-preferred result
Labor	Jack Wright	8,536	65.6	+4.9
Liberal	Terry McClean	4,469	34.4	−4.9
Labor hold		Swing	+4.9	

=== Albert Park ===
1982 South Australian state election: Albert Park
Party	Candidate	Votes	%	±%
Labor	Kevin Hamilton	11,012	62.7	+13.1
Liberal	Graham Ingerson	5,661	32.2	−8.6
Democrats	Ben Michael	894	5.1	−4.5
Total formal votes		17,567	93.7	−0.5
Informal votes		1,184	6.3	+0.5
Turnout		18,751	94.1	−0.1
Two-party-preferred result
Labor	Kevin Hamilton	11,459	61.1	+7.2
Liberal	Graham Ingerson	6,108	38.9	−7.2
Labor hold		Swing	+7.2	

=== Alexandra ===
1982 South Australian state election: Alexandra
Party	Candidate	Votes	%	±%
Liberal	Ted Chapman	10,519	57.8	−11.9
Labor	Helen McSkimming	4,235	23.3	+1.6
Democrats	Andrew Mills	2,158	11.9	+3.3
National	Rex Tilbrook	1,279	7.0	+7.0
Total formal votes		18,191	95.3	−1.5
Informal votes		906	4.7	+1.5
Turnout		19,097	94.6	+1.2
Two-party-preferred result
Liberal	Ted Chapman	12,557	69.0	−5.0
Labor	Helen McSkimming	5,634	31.0	+5.0
Liberal hold		Swing	−5.0	

=== Ascot Park ===
1982 South Australian state election: Ascot Park
Party	Candidate	Votes	%	±%
Labor	John Trainer	8,409	56.2	+8.2
Liberal	Chris Gellie	5,613	37.5	−4.0
Democrats	Michael Rogers	938	6.3	−4.2
Total formal votes		14,960	94.7	−1.0
Informal votes		835	5.3	+1.0
Turnout		15,795	94.3	+0.7
Two-party-preferred result
Labor	John Trainer	8,878	59.3	+7.6
Liberal	Chris Gellie	6,082	40.7	−7.6
Labor hold		Swing	+7.6	

=== Baudin ===
1982 South Australian state election: Baudin
Party	Candidate	Votes	%	±%
Labor	Don Hopgood	12,802	61.8	+13.6
Liberal	Deane Clough	6,068	29.3	−8.9
Democrats	Ivor Childs	1,838	8.9	−4.7
Total formal votes		20,708	93.5	−1.5
Informal votes		1,441	6.5	+1.5
Turnout		22,149	93.4	+1.0
Two-party-preferred result
Labor	Don Hopgood	13,721	66.2	+10.5
Liberal	Deane Clough	6,987	33.8	−10.5
Labor hold		Swing	+10.5	

=== Bragg ===
1982 South Australian state election: Bragg
Party	Candidate	Votes	%	±%
Liberal	David Tonkin	9,177	63.0	−3.0
Labor	Neill Lean	3,910	26.9	+3.9
Democrats	Guy Harley	1,475	10.1	−0.9
Total formal votes		14,562	95.9	−0.5
Informal votes		614	4.1	+0.5
Turnout		15,176	93.3	+1.3
Two-party-preferred result
Liberal	David Tonkin	9,915	68.1	−3.4
Labor	Neill Lean	4,647	31.9	+3.4
Liberal hold		Swing	−3.4	

=== Brighton ===
1982 South Australian state election: Brighton
Party	Candidate	Votes	%	±%
Labor	June Appleby	8,486	47.3	+6.3
Liberal	Dick Glazbrook	8,192	45.6	−3.1
Democrats	Bob Ralph	1,272	7.1	−3.2
Total formal votes		17,950	95.8	−0.8
Informal votes		792	4.2	+0.8
Turnout		18,742	94.3	+0.8
Two-party-preferred result
Labor	June Appleby	9,123	50.8	+5.5
Liberal	Dick Glazbrook	8,827	49.2	−5.5
Labor gain from Liberal		Swing	+5.5	

=== Chaffey ===
1982 South Australian state election: Chaffey
Party	Candidate	Votes	%	±%
Liberal	Peter Arnold	10,219	61.5	+0.4
Labor	Roland Telfer	5,109	30.7	−2.8
Democrats	Mike Elliott	1,291	7.8	+2.4
Total formal votes		16,619	94.5	−1.1
Informal votes		975	5.5	+1.1
Turnout		17,594	92.0	−2.3
Two-party-preferred result
Liberal	Peter Arnold	10,865	65.4	+1.6
Labor	Roland Telfer	5,754	34.6	−1.6
Liberal hold		Swing	+1.6	

=== Coles ===
1982 South Australian state election: Coles
Party	Candidate	Votes	%	±%
Liberal	Jennifer Adamson	8,470	48.3	−12.8
Labor	Rosalie McDonald	7,756	44.3	+10.8
Democrats	Stephen Swift	1,294	7.4	+2.0
Total formal votes		17,520	93.2	−2.7
Informal votes		1,277	6.8	+2.7
Turnout		18,797	94.8	+1.7
Two-party-preferred result
Liberal	Jennifer Adamson	8,980	51.3	−10.7
Labor	Rosalie McDonald	8,540	48.7	+10.7
Liberal hold		Swing	−10.7	

=== Davenport ===
1982 South Australian state election: Davenport
Party	Candidate	Votes	%	±%
Liberal	Dean Brown	12,133	71.2	−3.8
Labor	Emanuel Frossinakis	3,102	18.2	+2.6
Democrats	Merilyn de Guerin Pedrick	1,796	10.6	+1.2
Total formal votes		17,031	96.7	−1.3
Informal votes		584	3.3	+1.3
Turnout		17,615	92.5	−0.1
Two-party-preferred result
Liberal	Dean Brown	13,031	76.5	−3.2
Labor	Emanuel Frossinakis	4,000	23.5	+3.2
Liberal hold		Swing	−3.2	

=== Elizabeth ===
1982 South Australian state election: Elizabeth
Party	Candidate	Votes	%	±%
Labor	Peter Duncan	8,809	64.3	+9.6
Liberal	Esmond McKeown	4,129	24.4	−8.4
Democrats	Barbara Barlow	1,927	11.4	−1.1
Total formal votes		16,952	91.6	−2.5
Informal votes		1,558	8.4	+2.5
Turnout		18,510	91.9	−0.3
Two-party-preferred result
Labor	Peter Duncan	11,860	70.0	+9.1
Liberal	Esmond McKeown	5,092	30.0	−9.1
Labor hold		Swing	+9.1	

=== Eyre ===
1982 South Australian state election: Eyre
Party	Candidate	Votes	%	±%
Liberal	Graham Gunn	7,977	62.1	+2.2
Labor	Christina Phillis	4,862	37.9	−2.2
Total formal votes		12,839	92.7	−3.4
Informal votes		1,010	7.3	+3.4
Turnout		13,849	89.1	0.0
Liberal hold		Swing	+2.2	

=== Fisher ===
1982 South Australian state election: Fisher
Party	Candidate	Votes	%	±%
Liberal	Stan Evans	11,436	52.5	−10.0
Labor	Annice Vass	7,156	32.9	+7.8
Democrats	John Coulter	3,188	14.6	+2.2
Total formal votes		21,780	96.4	−1.2
Informal votes		812	3.6	+1.2
Turnout		22,592	93.9	−3.7
Two-party-preferred result
Liberal	Stan Evans	13,030	59.8	−8.9
Labor	Annice Vass	8,750	40.2	+8.9
Liberal hold		Swing	−8.9	

=== Flinders ===
1982 South Australian state election: Flinders
Party	Candidate	Votes	%	±%
National	Peter Blacker	8,106	53.6	−0.3
Liberal	Rex Mader	3,679	24.3	−2.7
Labor	Terrence Krieg	2,968	19.6	+0.5
Democrats	Helen Breakey	363	2.4	+2.4
Total formal votes		15,116	96.7	−0.6
Informal votes		509	3.3	+0.6
Turnout		15,625	94.2	+0.4
Two-party-preferred result
National	Peter Blacker	11,137	73.7	−0.4
Labor	Terrence Krieg	3,979	26.3	+0.4
National hold		Swing	−0.4	

=== Florey ===
1982 South Australian state election: Florey
Party	Candidate	Votes	%	±%
Labor	Bob Gregory	9,213	57.9	+8.8
Liberal	Philip Bayly	5,004	31.4	−7.4
Democrats	Andrew Sickerdick	1,698	10.7	−1.4
Total formal votes		15,915	93.7	−0.7
Informal votes		1,070	6.3	+0.7
Turnout		16,985	93.7	+0.5
Two-party-preferred result
Labor	Bob Gregory	10,062	63.2	+9.5
Liberal	Philip Bayly	5,853	36.8	−9.5
Labor hold		Swing	+9.5	

=== Gilles ===
1982 South Australian state election: Gilles
Party	Candidate	Votes	%	±%
Labor	Jack Slater	8,120	55.3	+7.0
Liberal	Gregory Minuzzo	4,970	33.8	−4.9
Democrats	Eileen Farmer	1,597	10.9	−2.1
Total formal votes		14,687	92.6	−2.1
Informal votes		1,165	7.4	+2.1
Turnout		15,852	93.7	+0.1
Two-party-preferred result
Labor	Jack Slater	8,919	60.7	+5.3
Liberal	Gregory Minuzzo	5,768	39.3	−5.3
Labor hold		Swing	+5.3	

=== Glenelg ===
1982 South Australian state election: Glenelg
Party	Candidate	Votes	%	±%
Liberal	John Mathwin	9,110	59.9	−2.8
Labor	Robert Dancer	5,387	35.4	+6.7
Democrats	Ronald Moulds	720	4.7	−3.9
Total formal votes		15,217	95.9	−0.9
Informal votes		646	4.1	+0.9
Turnout		15,863	93.1	+1.1
Two-party-preferred result
Liberal	John Mathwin	9,490	62.4	−4.8
Labor	Robert Dancer	5,727	37.6	+4.8
Liberal hold		Swing	−4.8	

=== Goyder ===
1982 South Australian state election: Goyder
Party	Candidate	Votes	%	±%
Liberal	John Meier	9,468	60.6	−16.5
Labor	Stephan Oulianoff	3,437	22.0	−0.9
National	Terence Halford	1,832	11.7	+11.7
Democrats	Kevin Jones	881	5.6	+5.6
Total formal votes		15,618	95.5	−0.6
Informal votes		740	4.5	+0.6
Turnout		16,358	93.9	−0.2
Two-party-preferred result
Liberal	John Meier	11,725	75.1	−2.0
Labor	Stephan Oulianoff	3,893	24.9	+2.0
Liberal hold		Swing	−2.0	

=== Hanson ===
1982 South Australian state election: Hanson
Party	Candidate	Votes	%	±%
Liberal	Heini Becker	8,720	55.1	−5.7
Labor	Derek Robertson	6,165	39.0	+5.7
Democrats	Clifford Boyd	936	5.9	0.0
Total formal votes		15,821	95.2	−1.2
Informal votes		804	4.8	+1.2
Turnout		16,625	92.7	−0.2
Two-party-preferred result
Liberal	Heini Becker	9,212	58.2	−6.3
Labor	Derek Robertson	6,609	41.8	+6.3
Liberal hold		Swing	−6.3	

=== Hartley ===
1982 South Australian state election: Hartley
Party	Candidate	Votes	%	±%
Labor	Terry Groom	8,734	52.0	+1.3
Liberal	Barry James	6,070	36.2	−4.8
Democrats	George Belperio	1,983	11.8	+3.5
Total formal votes		16,787	92.3	−1.9
Informal votes		1,408	7.7	+1.9
Turnout		18,195	92.6	−0.8
Two-party-preferred result
Labor	Terry Groom	10,076	60.0	+4.9
Liberal	Barry James	6,711	40.0	−4.9
Labor hold		Swing	+4.9	

=== Henley Beach ===
1982 South Australian state election: Henley Beach
Party	Candidate	Votes	%	±%
Labor	Don Ferguson	8,782	51.4	+7.5
Liberal	Bob Randall	7,409	43.4	−1.1
Democrats	Trevor Turner	882	5.2	−6.4
Total formal votes		17,073	94.2	−0.8
Informal votes		1,049	5.8	+0.8
Turnout		18,122	94.3	+1.3
Two-party-preferred result
Labor	Don Ferguson	9,216	54.0	+5.0
Liberal	Bob Randall	7,857	46.0	−5.0
Labor gain from Liberal		Swing	+5.0	

=== Kavel ===
1982 South Australian state election: Kavel
Party	Candidate	Votes	%	±%
Liberal	Roger Goldsworthy	10,878	63.4	−5.4
Labor	Geoffrey Anderson	5,019	29.2	+7.0
Democrats	Brian Fain	1,261	7.4	−1.6
Total formal votes		17,158	95.2	−2.0
Informal votes		855	4.8	+2.0
Turnout		18,013	93.5	−0.3
Two-party-preferred result
Liberal	Roger Goldsworthy	11,452	66.7	−7.6
Labor	Geoffrey Anderson	5,706	33.3	+7.6
Liberal hold		Swing	−7.6	

=== Light ===
1982 South Australian state election: Light
Party	Candidate	Votes	%	±%
Liberal	Bruce Eastick	9,553	62.3	−1.3
Labor	William Young	4,933	32.2	+2.5
Democrats	Nicholas Wedge	845	5.5	−1.2
Total formal votes		15,331	95.3	−1.3
Informal votes		751	4.7	+1.3
Turnout		16,082	94.9	+0.6
Two-party-preferred result
Liberal	Bruce Eastick	10,000	65.2	−2.0
Labor	William Young	5,331	34.8	+2.0
Liberal hold		Swing	−2.0	

=== Mallee ===
1982 South Australian state election: Mallee
Party	Candidate	Votes	%	±%
Liberal	Peter Lewis	8,374	57.5	+11.6
National	Guy Wheal	3,260	22.4	−2.6
Labor	Norman Napper	2,661	18.3	+0.4
Democrats	Samuel Pope	256	1.8	+1.8
Total formal votes		14,551	96.9	−0.3
Informal votes		468	3.1	+0.3
Turnout		15,019	94.7	+1.1
Two-party-preferred result
Liberal	Peter Lewis	11,641	80.0	+2.6
Labor	Norman Napper	2,910	20.0	−2.6
Liberal hold		Swing	+2.6	

- The two candidate preferred vote was not counted between the Liberal and National candidates for Mallee.

=== Mawson ===
1982 South Australian state election: Mawson
Party	Candidate	Votes	%	±%
Labor	Susan Lenehan	11,968	53.1	+11.8
Liberal	Ivar Schmidt	9,067	40.3	−6.8
Democrats	Jay McMerrick	1,488	6.6	−5.0
Total formal votes		22,523	95.3	−1.0
Informal votes		1,113	4.7	+1.0
Turnout		23,636	94.6	−0.1
Two-party-preferred result
Labor	Susan Lenehan	12,737	56.6	+9.6
Liberal	Ivar Schmidt	9,786	43.4	−9.6
Labor gain from Liberal		Swing	+9.6	

=== Mitcham ===
1982 South Australian state election: Mitcham
Party	Candidate	Votes	%	±%
Liberal	Stephen Baker	7,759	50.8	+13.5
Democrats	Heather Southcott	4,574	30.0	−15.1
Labor	John Hill	2,933	19.2	+1.9
Total formal votes		15,266	96.9	−1.2
Informal votes		493	3.1	+1.2
Turnout		15,759	93.0	−0.5
Two-candidate-preferred result
Liberal	Stephen Baker	9,226	60.4	+15.1
Democrats	Heather Southcott	6,040	39.6	−15.1
Liberal gain from Democrats		Swing	+15.1	

=== Mitchell ===
1982 South Australian state election: Mitchell
Party	Candidate	Votes	%	±%
Labor	Ron Payne	8,971	57.6	+7.8
Liberal	David Phelps	5,574	35.8	−3.2
Democrats	Kevin Whitby	1,026	6.6	−4.6
Total formal votes		15,571	94.7	−1.5
Informal votes		877	5.3	+1.5
Turnout		16,448	92.9	−0.4
Two-party-preferred result
Labor	Ron Payne	9,448	60.7	+6.4
Liberal	David Phelps	6,123	39.3	−6.4
Labor hold		Swing	+6.4	

=== Morphett ===
1982 South Australian state election: Morphett
Party	Candidate	Votes	%	±%
Liberal	John Oswald	7,346	49.1	−2.7
Labor	Stephen Blight	6,888	46.1	+3.8
Democrats	Graham Pamount	721	4.8	−1.1
Total formal votes		14,955	95.1	−1.6
Informal votes		764	4.9	+1.6
Turnout		15,719	92.5	−1.2
Two-party-preferred result
Liberal	John Oswald	7,696	51.5	−3.8
Labor	Stephen Blight	7,259	48.5	+3.8
Liberal hold		Swing	−3.8	

=== Mount Gambier ===
1982 South Australian state election: Mount Gambier
Party	Candidate	Votes	%	±%
Liberal	Harold Allison	8,444	50.0	−5.6
Labor	Kenneth Bonython	7,670	45.4	+1.0
Democrats	Meg Lees	767	4.5	+4.5
Total formal votes		16,881	96.3	−1.0
Informal votes		652	3.7	+1.0
Turnout		17,533	94.2	+0.4
Two-party-preferred result
Liberal	Harold Allison	8,816	52.2	−3.4
Labor	Kenneth Bonython	8,065	47.8	+3.4
Liberal hold		Swing	−3.4	

=== Murray ===
1982 South Australian state election: Murray
Party	Candidate	Votes	%	±%
Liberal	David Wotton	9,959	58.5	−4.3
Labor	Geoffrey McCulloch	6,326	37.1	+5.4
Democrats	Gerhard Weissmann	743	4.4	−1.1
Total formal votes		17,028	94.5	−1.7
Informal votes		988	5.5	+1.7
Turnout		18,016	94.3	+0.8
Two-party-preferred result
Liberal	David Wotton	10,327	60.6	−5.3
Labor	Geoffrey McCulloch	6,701	39.4	+5.3
Liberal hold		Swing	−5.3	

=== Napier ===
1982 South Australian state election: Napier
Party	Candidate	Votes	%	±%
Labor	Terry Hemmings	9,862	63.4	+10.8
Liberal	Eric Bates	3,775	24.3	−6.7
Democrats	John Ferguson	1,920	12.3	−4.0
Total formal votes		15,557	91.9	−1.5
Informal votes		1,365	8.1	+1.5
Turnout		16,922	90.3	−0.7
Two-party-preferred result
Labor	Terry Hemmings	10,768	69.2	+9.7
Liberal	Eric Bates	4,789	30.8	−9.7
Labor hold		Swing	+9.7	

=== Newland ===
1982 South Australian state election: Newland
Party	Candidate	Votes	%	±%
Labor	John Klunder	11,120	50.2	+11.9
Liberal	Brian Billard	9,555	43.1	−7.2
Democrats	Robert Mason	1,121	5.0	−6.4
National	Glen Stevens	372	1.7	+1.7
Total formal votes		22,168	95.6	0.0
Informal votes		1,011	4.4	0.0
Turnout		23,179	94.4	+0.6
Two-party-preferred result
Labor	John Klunder	11,871	53.6	+9.8
Liberal	Brian Billard	10,297	46.4	−9.8
Labor gain from Liberal		Swing	+9.8	

=== Norwood ===
1982 South Australian state election: Norwood
Party	Candidate	Votes	%	±%
Labor	Greg Crafter	8,510	56.1	+9.1
Liberal	Lynton Crosby	5,756	38.0	−8.9
Democrats	Josephine Read	898	5.9	−0.2
Total formal votes		15,164	94.7	−0.9
Informal votes		844	5.3	+0.9
Turnout		16,008	90.3	−2.0
Two-party-preferred result
Labor	Greg Crafter	8,963	59.1	+9.2
Liberal	Lynton Crosby	6,201	40.9	−9.2
Labor hold		Swing	+9.2	

=== Peake ===
1982 South Australian state election: Peake
Party	Candidate	Votes	%	±%
Labor	Keith Plunkett	8,837	60.9	+3.1
Liberal	Laurie Whitelaw	3,928	27.1	−15.1
Democrats	Jim Mitchell	1,744	12.0	+12.0
Total formal votes		14,509	92.2	−1.4
Informal votes		1,223	7.8	+1.4
Turnout		15,732	92.9	−0.3
Two-party-preferred result
Labor	Keith Plunkett	10,077	69.5	+11.7
Liberal	Laurie Whitelaw	4,432	30.5	−11.7
Labor hold		Swing	+11.7	

=== Playford ===
1982 South Australian state election: Playford
Party	Candidate	Votes	%	±%
Labor	Terry McRae	10,391	59.5	+12.6
Liberal	Bill Arnold	5,510	31.5	−4.8
Democrats	Colin Nieass	1,568	9.0	−7.8
Total formal votes		17,469	92.3	−1.4
Informal votes		1,452	7.7	+1.4
Turnout		18,921	93.2	−0.2
Two-party-preferred result
Labor	Terry McRae	11,304	64.7	+9.6
Liberal	Bill Arnold	6,165	35.3	−9.6
Labor hold		Swing	+9.6	

=== Price ===
1982 South Australian state election: Price
Party	Candidate	Votes	%	±%
Labor	George Whitten	8,753	66.1	+9.7
Liberal	Sue Crew	4,488	33.9	+1.3
Total formal votes		13,241	89.0	−3.6
Informal votes		1,634	11.0	+3.6
Turnout		14,875	94.1	+1.7
Labor hold		Swing	+5.6	

=== Rocky River ===
1982 South Australian state election: Rocky River
Party	Candidate	Votes	%	±%
Liberal	John Olsen	8,943	56.4	+7.3
Labor	Denis Crisp	6,043	38.1	+4.1
National	John Reilly	522	3.3	−13.6
Democrats	Gordon Weber	354	2.2	+2.2
Total formal votes		15,862	96.2	−0.5
Informal votes		625	3.8	+0.5
Turnout		16,487	94.7	+0.2
Two-party-preferred result
Liberal	John Olsen	9,566	60.3	−2.8
Labor	Denis Crisp	6,296	39.7	+2.8
Liberal hold		Swing	−2.8	

=== Ross Smith ===
1982 South Australian state election: Ross Smith
Party	Candidate	Votes	%	±%
Labor	John Bannon	10,200	75.7	+11.1
Liberal	Ruth Squire	3,284	24.4	−2.5
Total formal votes		13,484	90.4	−3.1
Informal votes		1,427	9.6	+3.1
Turnout		14,911	92.3	−0.5
Labor hold		Swing	+7.2	

=== Salisbury ===
1982 South Australian state election: Salisbury
Party	Candidate	Votes	%	±%
Labor	Lynn Arnold	13,632	69.1	+8.3
Liberal	Derrick Rich	4,759	24.1	−15.1
Democrats	David Vigor	1,343	6.8	+6.8
Total formal votes		19,734	91.3	−1.7
Informal votes		1,868	8.7	+1.7
Turnout		21,602	92.8	−0.5
Two-party-preferred result
Labor	Lynn Arnold	14,316	72.5	+11.7
Liberal	Derrick Rich	5,418	27.5	−11.7
Labor hold		Swing	+11.7	

=== Semaphore ===
1982 South Australian state election: Semaphore
Party	Candidate	Votes	%	±%
Independent	Norm Peterson	7,915	46.8	+15.1
Labor	Peter Bicknell	6,462	38.2	+2.3
Liberal	Macleay Lawrie	2,244	13.3	−14.7
Democrats	Peter Gagliardi	295	1.7	−2.7
Total formal votes		16,916	94.9	+0.5
Informal votes		910	5.1	−0.5
Turnout		17,826	93.4	−1.2
Two-candidate-preferred result
Independent	Norm Peterson	10,207	60.3	−1.9
Labor	Peter Bicknell	6,709	39.7	+1.9
Independent hold		Swing	−1.9	

=== Spence ===
1982 South Australian state election: Spence
Party	Candidate	Votes	%	±%
Labor	Roy Abbott	9,866	77.9	+7.7
Liberal	Elizabeth Bronisz	2,803	22.1	−7.7
Total formal votes		12,669	89.6	−4.0
Informal votes		1,469	10.4	+4.0
Turnout		14,138	92.8	0.0
Labor hold		Swing	+7.7	

=== Stuart ===
1982 South Australian state election: Stuart
Party	Candidate	Votes	%	±%
Labor	Gavin Keneally	10,403	66.6	−0.4
Liberal	Sydney Cheesman	3,865	24.7	−8.3
Democrats	David Chapman	1,364	8.7	+8.7
Total formal votes		15,632	92.8	−2.5
Informal votes		1,212	7.2	+2.5
Turnout		16,844	93.9	−0.3
Two-party-preferred result
Labor	Gavin Keneally	10,942	70.0	+3.1
Liberal	Sydney Cheesman	4,690	30.0	−3.1
Labor hold		Swing	+3.1	

=== Todd ===
1982 South Australian state election: Todd
Party	Candidate	Votes	%	±%
Liberal	Scott Ashenden	8,664	46.1	−3.7
Labor	John Lewis	8,358	44.5	+3.7
Democrats	Sandra Kanck	1,213	6.5	−2.9
National	Rex Senior	538	2.9	+2.9
Total formal votes		18,773	95.1	−0.9
Informal votes		959	4.9	+0.9
Turnout		19,732	94.9	+0.9
Two-party-preferred result
Liberal	Scott Ashenden	9,652	51.4	−3.2
Labor	John Lewis	9,121	48.6	+3.2
Liberal hold		Swing	−3.2	

=== Torrens ===
1982 South Australian state election: Torrens
Party	Candidate	Votes	%	±%
Liberal	Michael Wilson	7,602	52.0	−4.0
Labor	Mike Duigan	6,277	43.0	+8.0
Democrats	Joseph Zingarelli	732	5.0	−4.0
Total formal votes		14,611	95.6	−0.8
Informal votes		674	4.4	+0.8
Turnout		15,285	90.4	+0.6
Two-party-preferred result
Liberal	Michael Wilson	7,961	54.5	−5.6
Labor	Mike Duigan	6,650	45.5	+5.6
Liberal hold		Swing	−5.6	

=== Unley ===
1982 South Australian state election: Unley
Party	Candidate	Votes	%	±%
Labor	Kym Mayes	7,704	53.2	+6.1
Liberal	Robert Nicholls	5,670	39.1	−4.3
Democrats	Margaret-Ann Williams	804	5.6	−3.9
National	Allan Osmond	314	2.1	+2.1
Total formal votes		14,492	94.9	−0.3
Informal votes		775	5.1	+0.3
Turnout		15,267	92.0	+1.9
Two-party-preferred result
Labor	Kym Mayes	8,209	56.6	+4.3
Liberal	Robert Nicholls	6,283	43.4	−4.3
Labor hold		Swing	+4.3	

=== Victoria ===
1982 South Australian state election: Victoria
Party	Candidate	Votes	%	±%
Liberal	Allan Rodda	8,023	55.7	−12.3
Labor	Simon Bryant	4,427	30.7	−1.3
National	Geoffrey Clothier	1,559	10.8	+10.8
Democrats	Peter Butcher	398	2.8	+2.8
Total formal votes		14,407	95.5	−0.4
Informal votes		673	4.5	+0.4
Turnout		15,080	94.3	+1.0
Two-party-preferred result
Liberal	Allan Rodda	9,592	66.6	−1.4
Labor	Simon Bryant	4,815	33.4	+1.4
Liberal hold		Swing	−1.4	

=== Whyalla ===
1982 South Australian state election: Whyalla
Party	Candidate	Votes	%	±%
Labor	Max Brown	7,356	49.1	−14.6
Independent	Peter Murphy	4,337	28.9	+28.9
Liberal	Vivienne Cruickshank	2,703	18.0	−11.8
Democrats	Mary Good	596	4.0	−1.0
Total formal votes		14,992	93.3	−1.2
Informal votes		1,079	6.7	+1.2
Turnout		16,071	90.5	−1.3
Two-candidate-preferred result
Labor	Max Brown	8,113	54.1	−12.6
Independent	Peter Murphy	6,879	45.9	+45.9
Labor hold		Swing	−12.6	

== See also ==
- Candidates of the 1982 South Australian state election
- Members of the South Australian House of Assembly, 1982–1985
