= Members of the South Australian House of Assembly, 1982–1985 =

This is a list of members of the South Australian House of Assembly from 1982 to 1985, as elected at the 1982 state election:

Name	Party	Electorate	Term of office
Roy Abbott	Labor	Spence	1975–1989
Hon Jennifer Adamson	Liberal	Coles	1977–1993
Hon Harold Allison	Liberal	Mount Gambier	1975–1997
June Appleby	Labor	Hayward	1982–1989
Hon Peter Arnold	Liberal	Chaffey	1968–1970, 1973–1993
Lynn Arnold	Labor	Salisbury	1979–1994
Scott Ashenden	Liberal	Todd	1979–1985, 1993–1997
Stephen Baker	Liberal	Mitcham	1982–1997
John Bannon	Labor	Ross Smith	1977–1993
Heini Becker	Liberal	Hanson	1970–1997
Peter Blacker	NCP/National ^{[3]}	Flinders	1973–1993
Dean Brown	Liberal	Davenport	1973–1985, 1992–2006
Max Brown	Labor	Whyalla	1970–1985
Hon Ted Chapman	Liberal	Alexandra	1973–1992
Greg Crafter	Labor	Norwood	1979, 1980–1993
Hon Peter Duncan ^{[2]}	Labor	Elizabeth	1973–1984
Hon Bruce Eastick	Liberal	Light	1970–1993
Martyn Evans ^{[2]}	Independent	Elizabeth	1984–1994
Stan Evans	Liberal	Fisher	1968–1993
Don Ferguson	Labor	Henley Beach	1982–1993
Roger Goldsworthy	Liberal	Kavel	1970–1992
Bob Gregory	Labor	Florey	1982–1993
Terry Groom	Labor	Hartley	1977–1979, 1982–1993
Graham Gunn	Liberal	Eyre	1970–2010
Terry Hemmings	Labor	Napier	1977–1993
Graham Ingerson ^{[1]}	Liberal	Bragg	1983–2002
Kevin Hamilton	Labor	Albert Park	1979–1993
Hon Dr Don Hopgood	Labor	Baudin	1970–1993
Gavin Keneally	Labor	Stuart	1970–1989
John Klunder	Labor	Newland	1977–1979, 1982–1993
Susan Lenehan	Labor	Mawson	1982–1993
Peter Lewis	Liberal	Mallee	1979–2006
John Mathwin	Liberal	Glenelg	1970–1985
Kym Mayes	Labor	Unley	1982–1993
Terry McRae	Labor	Playford	1970–1989
John Meier	Liberal	Goyder	1982–2006
John Olsen	Liberal	Rocky River	1979–1990, 1992–2002
John Oswald	Liberal	Morphett	1979–2002
Hon Ron Payne	Labor	Mitchell	1970–1989
Norm Peterson	Independent	Semaphore	1979–1993
Keith Plunkett	Labor	Peake	1979–1989
Allan Rodda	Liberal	Victoria	1965–1985
Jack Slater	Labor	Gilles	1970–1989
Hon Dr David Tonkin ^{[1]}	Liberal	Bragg	1970–1983
John Trainer	Labor	Ascot Park	1979–1993
George Whitten	Labor	Price	1975–1985
Hon Michael Wilson	Liberal	Torrens	1977–1985
Hon David Wotton	Liberal	Murray	1975–2002
Hon Jack Wright	Labor	Adelaide	1971–1985

^{1} The Liberal member for Bragg, David Tonkin, resigned on 10 April 1983. Liberal candidate Graham Ingerson won the resulting by-election on 14 May 1983.
^{2} The Labor member for Elizabeth, Peter Duncan, resigned on 25 October 1984 in order to contest the federal seat of Makin at the 1984 election. Independent candidate Martyn Evans won the resulting by-election on 1 December 1984.
^{3} The National Country Party changed its name to the National Party during the course of this term.
