= Electoral results for the district of Mitcham (South Australia) =

South Australian district election results

This is a list of election results for the Electoral district of Mitcham in South Australian elections.

== Members for Mitcham ==
Member	Party	Term
Henry Dunks	Liberal and Country	1938–1955
Robin Millhouse	Liberal and Country	1955–1973
Robin Millhouse	Liberal Movement	1973–1976
Robin Millhouse	New LM	1976–1977
Robin Millhouse	Democrats	1977–1982
Heather Southcott	Democrats	1982
Stephen Baker	Liberal	1982–1993

== Election results ==
=== Elections in the 1980s ===
1989 South Australian state election: Mitcham
Party	Candidate	Votes	%	±%
Liberal	Stephen Baker	9,883	55.3	−0.2
Labor	Timothy Campbell	5,671	31.7	−5.9
Democrats	Matthew Greenwood	2,312	12.9	+6.0
Total formal votes		17,866	98.1	+1.2
Informal votes		346	1.9	−1.2
Turnout		18,212	93.2	+0.3
Two-party-preferred result
Liberal	Stephen Baker	10,890	61.0	+2.7
Labor	Timothy Campbell	6,976	39.0	−2.7
Liberal hold		Swing	+2.7	

1985 South Australian state election: Mitcham
Party	Candidate	Votes	%	±%
Liberal	Stephen Baker	9,859	55.5	+6.5
Labor	Barbara Hughes	6,689	37.6	+8.6
Democrats	Guy Harley	1,230	6.9	−15.1
Total formal votes		17,778	96.9	
Informal votes		578	3.1	
Turnout		18,356	92.9	
Two-party-preferred result
Liberal	Stephen Baker	10,368	58.3	−1.7
Labor	Barbara Hughes	7,410	41.7	+1.7
Liberal hold		Swing	−1.7	

1982 South Australian state election: Mitcham
Party	Candidate	Votes	%	±%
Liberal	Stephen Baker	7,759	50.8	+13.5
Democrats	Heather Southcott	4,574	30.0	−15.1
Labor	John Hill	2,933	19.2	+1.9
Total formal votes		15,266	96.9	−1.2
Informal votes		493	3.1	+1.2
Turnout		15,759	93.0	−0.5
Two-candidate-preferred result
Liberal	Stephen Baker	9,226	60.4	+15.1
Democrats	Heather Southcott	6,040	39.6	−15.1
Liberal gain from Democrats		Swing	+15.1	

Mitcham state by-election, 8 May 1982
Party	Candidate	Votes	%	±%
Liberal	Robert Worth	6,461	45.9	+8.6
Democrats	Heather Southcott	3,653	25.9	−19.2
Labor	John Hill	3,367	23.9	+6.6
National	Ross Osmond	543	3.8	+3.8
Libertarian	Victor Kirby	66	0.5	+0.5
Total formal votes		14,190	98.0	−0.1
Informal votes		286	2.0	+0.1
Turnout		14,376	85.5	−8.0
Two-candidate-preferred result
Democrats	Heather Southcott	7,090	50.3	−4.4
Liberal	Robert Worth	7,000	49.7	+4.4
Democrats hold		Swing	N/A	

=== Elections in the 1970s ===
1979 South Australian state election: Mitcham
Party	Candidate	Votes	%	±%
Democrats	Robin Millhouse	6,947	45.1	+12.8
Liberal	Robert Worth	5,750	37.3	−4.5
Labor	Rosemary Crowley	2,671	17.3	−8.6
Australia	Ian Modistach	41	0.3	+0.3
Total formal votes		15,409	98.1	−0.9
Informal votes		290	1.9	+0.9
Turnout		15,699	93.5	+0.5
Two-candidate-preferred result
Democrats	Robin Millhouse	8,426	54.7	−1.8
Liberal	Robert Worth	6,983	45.3	+1.8
Democrats hold		Swing	−1.8	

1977 South Australian state election: Mitcham
Party	Candidate	Votes	%	±%
Liberal	Robert Worth	6,663	41.8	+14.1
Democrats	Robin Millhouse	5,146	32.3	+32.3
Labor	Rosemary Crowley	4,130	25.9	−3.2
Total formal votes		15,939	99.0	
Informal votes		166	1.0	
Turnout		16,105	93.0	
Two-candidate-preferred result
Democrats	Robin Millhouse	9,002	56.5	+56.5
Liberal	Robert Worth	6,937	43.5	+43.5
Democrats gain from Liberal Movement		Swing	N/A	

1975 South Australian state election: Mitcham
Party	Candidate	Votes	%	±%
Liberal Movement	Robin Millhouse	6,820	43.2	+43.2
Labor	Sean Dawes	4,602	29.1	−3.3
Liberal	Graham Callister	4,382	27.7	−34.3
Total formal votes		15,804	97.7	−0.3
Informal votes		377	2.3	+0.3
Turnout		16,181	93.3	−0.8
Two-candidate-preferred result
Liberal Movement	Robin Millhouse	10,710	67.8	+67.8
Labor	Sean Dawes	5,094	32.2	−2.1
Liberal Movement gain from Liberal		Swing	N/A	

1973 South Australian state election: Mitcham
Party	Candidate	Votes	%	±%
Liberal and Country	Robin Millhouse	9,528	62.0	−3.0
Labor	Sean Dawes	4,977	32.4	−2.6
Independent	Arthur Cockington	856	5.6	+5.6
Total formal votes		15,361	98.0	−0.4
Informal votes		309	2.0	+0.4
Turnout		15,670	94.1	−0.2
Two-party-preferred result
Liberal and Country	Robin Millhouse	9,324	65.7	+0.7
Labor	Sean Dawes	6,037	34.3	−0.7
Liberal and Country hold		Swing	+0.7	

1970 South Australian state election: Mitcham
Party	Candidate	Votes	%	±%
Liberal and Country	Robin Millhouse	9,584	65.0	
Labor	Ronald Lock	5,157	35.0	
Total formal votes		14,741	98.4	
Informal votes		245	1.6	
Turnout		14,986	94.3	
Liberal and Country hold		Swing		

=== Elections in the 1960s ===
1968 South Australian state election: Mitcham
Party	Candidate	Votes	%	±%
Liberal and Country	Robin Millhouse	16,056	64.8	−0.8
Labor	Peter Gilchrist	8,727	35.2	+2.8
Total formal votes		24,783	98.5	+0.3
Informal votes		381	1.5	−1.5
Turnout		25,164	93.0	−0.8
Liberal and Country hold		Swing	−1.8	

1965 South Australian state election: Mitcham
Party	Candidate	Votes	%	±%
Liberal and Country	Robin Millhouse	15,015	65.6	+1.8
Labor	Murty Conlon	7,427	32.4	+2.0
Social Credit	Ernst Hergstrom	454	2.0	+2.0
Total formal votes		22,896	98.2	−0.6
Informal votes		441	1.8	+0.6
Turnout		23,337	93.8	+1.3
Two-party-preferred result
Liberal and Country	Robin Millhouse	15,242	66.6	−2.2
Labor	Murty Conlon	7,654	33.4	+2.2
Liberal and Country hold		Swing	−2.2	

1962 South Australian state election: Mitcham
Party	Candidate	Votes	%	±%
Liberal and Country	Robin Millhouse	13,746	63.8	−3.4
Labor	Eric Thorp	6,542	30.4	+1.2
Democratic Labor	Edward Farrell	1,259	5.8	+2.2
Total formal votes		21,547	98.8	+0.6
Informal votes		264	1.2	−0.6
Turnout		21,811	92.5	−0.9
Two-party-preferred result
Liberal and Country	Robin Millhouse	14,816	68.8	−1.4
Labor	Eric Thorp	6,731	31.2	+1.4
Liberal and Country hold		Swing	−1.4	

=== Elections in the 1950s ===
1959 South Australian state election: Mitcham
Party	Candidate	Votes	%	±%
Liberal and Country	Robin Millhouse	13,441	67.2	−32.8
Labor	Sylvester Byrne	5,852	29.2	+29.2
Democratic Labor	Patrick McCabe	724	3.6	+3.6
Total formal votes		20,017	98.2	
Informal votes		373	1.8	
Turnout		20,390	93.4	
Two-party-preferred result
Liberal and Country	Robin Millhouse		70.2	
Labor	Sylvester Byrne		29.8	
Liberal and Country hold		Swing	N/A	

- The two party preferred vote was estimated.

1956 South Australian state election: Mitcham
Party	Candidate	Votes	%	±%
Liberal and Country	Robin Millhouse	unopposed		
Liberal and Country hold		Swing		

1953 South Australian state election: Mitcham
Party	Candidate	Votes	%	±%
Liberal and Country	Henry Dunks	unopposed		
Liberal and Country hold		Swing		

1950 South Australian state election: Mitcham
Party	Candidate	Votes	%	±%
Liberal and Country	Henry Dunks	12,384	68.5	+1.4
Labor	Charles Smith	5,684	31.5	−1.4
Total formal votes		18,068	98.4	+0.4
Informal votes		291	1.6	−0.4
Turnout		18,359	92.5	−0.4
Liberal and Country hold		Swing	+1.4	

=== Elections in the 1940s ===
1947 South Australian state election: Mitcham
Party	Candidate	Votes	%	±%
Liberal and Country	Henry Dunks	11,650	67.1	+7.2
Labor	John Borthwick	5,700	32.9	−7.2
Total formal votes		17,350	98.0	+1.1
Informal votes		359	2.0	−1.1
Turnout		17,709	92.9	+5.4
Liberal and Country hold		Swing	+7.2	

1944 South Australian state election: Mitcham
Party	Candidate	Votes	%	±%
Liberal and Country	Henry Dunks	9,303	59.9	−4.1
Labor	Victor Doble	6,236	40.1	+20.4
Total formal votes		15,539	97.0	−1.6
Informal votes		486	3.0	+1.6
Turnout		16,025	87.5	+36.7
Liberal and Country hold		Swing	N/A	

1941 South Australian state election: Mitcham
Party	Candidate	Votes	%	±%
Liberal and Country	Henry Dunks	5,321	64.0	+9.8
Labor	Leonard Pilton	1,639	19.7	−1.5
Independent	Herbert Kemp	1,351	16.3	+16.3
Total formal votes		8,311	98.6	+0.1
Informal votes		118	1.4	−0.1
Turnout		8,429	50.8	−10.6
Liberal and Country hold		Swing	N/A	

- Preferences were not distributed.

=== Elections in the 1930s ===
1938 South Australian state election: Mitcham
Party	Candidate	Votes	%	±%
Liberal and Country	Henry Dunks	5,019	54.2	
Labor	Frank Walsh	1,966	21.2	
Independent	Clarence Goode	1,559	16.8	
Independent	Nelson Clark	722	7.8	
Total formal votes		9,266	98.5	
Informal votes		136	1.5	
Turnout		9,402	61.4	
Liberal and Country hold		Swing		

- Preferences were not distributed.
