= Electoral results for the district of Glenelg (South Australia) =

South Australian district election results

This is a list of election results for the electoral district of Glenelg in South Australian elections.

== Members for Glenelg ==
Member	Party	Term
William Fisk	Independent	1938–1940
Frank Smith	Liberal and Country	1941–1947
Baden Pattinson	Liberal and Country	1947–1965
Hugh Hudson	Labor	1965–1970
John Mathwin	Liberal and Country	1970–1974
John Mathwin	Liberal	1974–1985

== Election results ==
=== Elections in the 1980s ===
1982 South Australian state election: Glenelg
Party	Candidate	Votes	%	±%
Liberal	John Mathwin	9,110	59.9	−2.8
Labor	Robert Dancer	5,387	35.4	+6.7
Democrats	Ronald Moulds	720	4.7	−3.9
Total formal votes		15,217	95.9	−0.9
Informal votes		646	4.1	+0.9
Turnout		15,863	93.1	+1.1
Two-party-preferred result
Liberal	John Mathwin	9,490	62.4	−4.8
Labor	Robert Dancer	5,727	37.6	+4.8
Liberal hold		Swing	−4.8	

=== Elections in the 1970s ===
1979 South Australian state election: Glenelg
Party	Candidate	Votes	%	±%
Liberal	John Mathwin	9,527	62.7	+3.2
Labor	Maurice Hearn	4,369	28.7	−11.8
Democrats	Diana Harte	1,302	8.6	+8.6
Total formal votes		15,198	96.8	−0.9
Informal votes		499	3.2	+0.9
Turnout		15,697	92.0	−0.8
Two-party-preferred result
Liberal	John Mathwin	10,218	67.2	+7.7
Labor	Maurice Hearn	4,980	32.8	−7.7
Liberal hold		Swing	+7.7	

1977 South Australian state election: Glenelg
Party	Candidate	Votes	%	±%
Liberal	John Mathwin	9,421	59.5	+23.9
Labor	Barbara Wiese	6,423	40.5	−0.4
Total formal votes		15,844	97.7	
Informal votes		374	2.3	
Turnout		16,218	92.8	
Liberal hold		Swing	+4.2	

1975 South Australian state election: Glenelg
Party	Candidate	Votes	%	±%
Labor	Brian Crawford	6,706	39.8	−7.5
Liberal	John Mathwin	6,429	38.1	−14.6
Liberal Movement	Peter Heysen	3,728	22.1	+22.1
Total formal votes		16,863	97.2	−0.6
Informal votes		490	2.8	+0.6
Turnout		17,353	93.0	−1.3
Two-party-preferred result
Liberal	John Mathwin	9,766	57.9	+5.2
Labor	Brian Crawford	7,096	42.1	−5.2
Liberal hold		Swing	+5.2	

1973 South Australian state election: Glenelg
Party	Candidate	Votes	%	±%
Liberal and Country	John Mathwin	8,465	52.7	−1.0
Labor	Brian Crawford	7,604	47.3	+4.3
Total formal votes		16,069	97.8	−0.9
Informal votes		359	2.2	+0.9
Turnout		16,428	94.3	−1.3
Liberal and Country hold		Swing	−3.8	

1970 South Australian state election: Glenelg
Party	Candidate	Votes	%	±%
Liberal and Country	John Mathwin	8,329	53.7	
Labor	Alan Sexton	6,670	43.0	
Democratic Labor	Mark Posa	504	3.3	
Total formal votes		15,503	98.7	
Informal votes		197	1.3	
Turnout		15,700	95.6	
Two-party-preferred result
Liberal and Country	John Mathwin	8,767	56.5	
Labor	Alan Sexton	6,746	43.5	
Liberal and Country hold		Swing		

=== Elections in the 1960s ===
1968 South Australian state election: Glenelg
Party	Candidate	Votes	%	±%
Labor	Hugh Hudson	18,711	53.3	+1.8
Liberal and Country	John McCoy	15,165	43.2	−1.4
Democratic Labor	Mark Posa	1,203	3.4	−0.5
Total formal votes		35,079	98.5	−0.1
Informal votes		536	1.5	+0.1
Turnout		35,615	95.2	+0.2
Two-party-preferred result
Labor	Hugh Hudson	18,891	53.9	+1.8
Liberal and Country	John McCoy	16,188	46.1	−1.8
Labor hold		Swing	+1.8	

1965 South Australian state election: Glenelg
Party	Candidate	Votes	%	±%
Labor	Hugh Hudson	16,869	51.5	+7.4
Liberal and Country	Baden Pattinson	14,613	44.6	−5.3
Democratic Labor	Mark Posa	1,267	3.9	−2.1
Total formal votes		32,749	98.6	+0.1
Informal votes		457	1.4	−0.1
Turnout		33,206	95.0	+0.8
Two-party-preferred result
Labor	Hugh Hudson	17,059	52.1	+5.4
Liberal and Country	Baden Pattinson	15,690	47.9	−5.4
Labor gain from Liberal and Country		Swing	+5.4	

1962 South Australian state election: Glenelg
Party	Candidate	Votes	%	±%
Liberal and Country	Baden Pattinson	15,109	49.9	−5.8
Labor	Ian Charles	13,346	44.1	+7.7
Democratic Labor	Nathaniel Bishop	1,809	6.0	−1.9
Total formal votes		30,264	98.5	+0.5
Informal votes		445	1.5	−0.5
Turnout		30,709	94.2	+0.3
Two-party-preferred result
Liberal and Country	Baden Pattinson	16,128	53.3	−9.1
Labor	Ian Charles	14,136	46.7	+9.1
Liberal and Country hold		Swing	−9.1	

=== Elections in the 1950s ===
1959 South Australian state election: Glenelg
Party	Candidate	Votes	%	±%
Liberal and Country	Baden Pattinson	14,735	55.7	+2.1
Labor	Richard Clifford	9,641	36.4	−4.9
Democratic Labor	Nathaniel Bishop	2,082	7.9	+2.8
Total formal votes		26,458	98.0	−0.5
Informal votes		528	2.0	+0.5
Turnout		26,986	93.9	−0.5
Two-party-preferred result
Liberal and Country	Baden Pattinson		62.4	+4.4
Labor	Richard Clifford		37.6	−4.4
Liberal and Country hold		Swing	+4.4	

- Two party preferred vote was estimated.

1956 South Australian state election: Glenelg
Party	Candidate	Votes	%	±%
Liberal and Country	Baden Pattinson	11,650	53.6	
Labor	Loftus Fenwick	8,959	41.3	
Labor (A-C)	Peter Lasarewitch	1,100	5.1	
Total formal votes		21,719	98.5	
Informal votes		325	1.5	
Turnout		22,044	94.4	
Two-party-preferred result
Liberal and Country	Baden Pattinson		58.0	
Labor	Loftus Fenwick		42.0	
Liberal and Country hold		Swing		

- Two party preferred vote was estimated.

1953 South Australian state election: Glenelg
Party	Candidate	Votes	%	±%
Liberal and Country	Baden Pattinson	12,927	50.7	−11.6
Labor	Loftus Fenwick	12,562	49.3	+11.6
Total formal votes		25,489	97.5	+0.2
Informal votes		617	2.5	−0.2
Turnout		26,128	95.6	+1.7
Liberal and Country hold		Swing	−11.6	

1950 South Australian state election: Glenelg
Party	Candidate	Votes	%	±%
Liberal and Country	Baden Pattinson	13,673	62.3	+1.7
Labor	John Sexton	8,272	37.7	+2.3
Total formal votes		21,945	97.3	+0.2
Informal votes		617	2.7	−0.2
Turnout		22,562	93.9	0.0
Liberal and Country hold		Swing	N/A	

=== Elections in the 1940s ===
1947 South Australian state election: Glenelg
Party	Candidate	Votes	%	±%
Liberal and Country	Baden Pattinson	11,696	60.6	+3.6
Labor	Ralph Wells	6,832	35.4	−7.6
Independent	Andrew Low	768	4.0	+4.0
Total formal votes		19,296	97.1	+0.7
Informal votes		576	2.9	−0.7
Liberal and Country hold		Swing	N/A	

- Preferences were not distributed.

1944 South Australian state election: Glenelg
Party	Candidate	Votes	%	±%
Liberal and Country	Frank Smith	9,710	57.0	−7.8
Labor	John Fitzgerald	7,327	43.0	+7.8
Total formal votes		17,037	96.4	−0.5
Informal votes		637	3.6	+0.5
Turnout		17,674	89.8	+42.2
Liberal and Country hold		Swing	−7.8	

1941 South Australian state election: Glenelg
Party	Candidate	Votes	%	±%
Liberal and Country	Frank Smith	5,232	64.8	+24.7
Labor	Sydney Gay	2,847	35.2	+15.9
Total formal votes		8,079	96.9	−1.5
Informal votes		257	3.1	+1.5
Turnout		8,336	47.6	−12.3
Liberal and Country gain from Independent		Swing	N/A	

=== Elections in the 1930s ===
1938 South Australian state election: Glenelg
Party	Candidate	Votes	%	±%
Independent	William Fisk	3,831	40.5	
Liberal and Country	Ernest Anthoney	3,793	40.1	
Labor	Thomas Barker	1,825	19.3	
Total formal votes		9,449	98.4	
Informal votes		154	1.6	
Turnout		9,603	59.9	
Two-candidate-preferred result
Independent	William Fisk	5,295	56.0	
Liberal and Country	Ernest Anthoney	4,154	44.0	
Independent gain from Liberal and Country		Swing		
