= 1982 South Australian state election =

- 6 November 1982

All 47 seats in the South Australian House of Assembly 24 seats were needed for a majority 11 (of the 22) seats in the South Australian Legislative Council
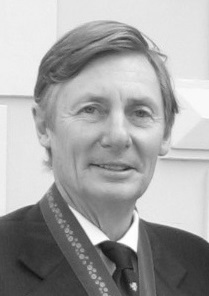

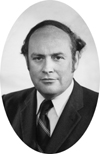
	First party	Second party	Third party
			DEM
Leader	John Bannon	David Tonkin	Heather Southcott
Party	Labor	Liberal	Democrats
Leader since	18 September 1979	24 July 1975	8 May 1982
Leader's seat	Ross Smith	Bragg	Mitcham
Last election	20 seats	24 seats	1
Seats won	24	21	0
Seat change	▲4	▼3	▼1
Popular vote	353,999	326,372	54,457
Percentage	46.28%	42.67%	7.12%
Swing	▲5.43	▼5.27	▼1.18pp
TPP	50.9%	49.1%
TPP swing	▲5.9	▼5.9
	Fourth party
	NAT
Leader	Peter Blacker
Party	National
Leader's seat	Flinders
Last election	1 seat
Seats won	1
Seat change	Steady
Popular vote	17,782
Percentage	2.32%
Swing	▲0.42
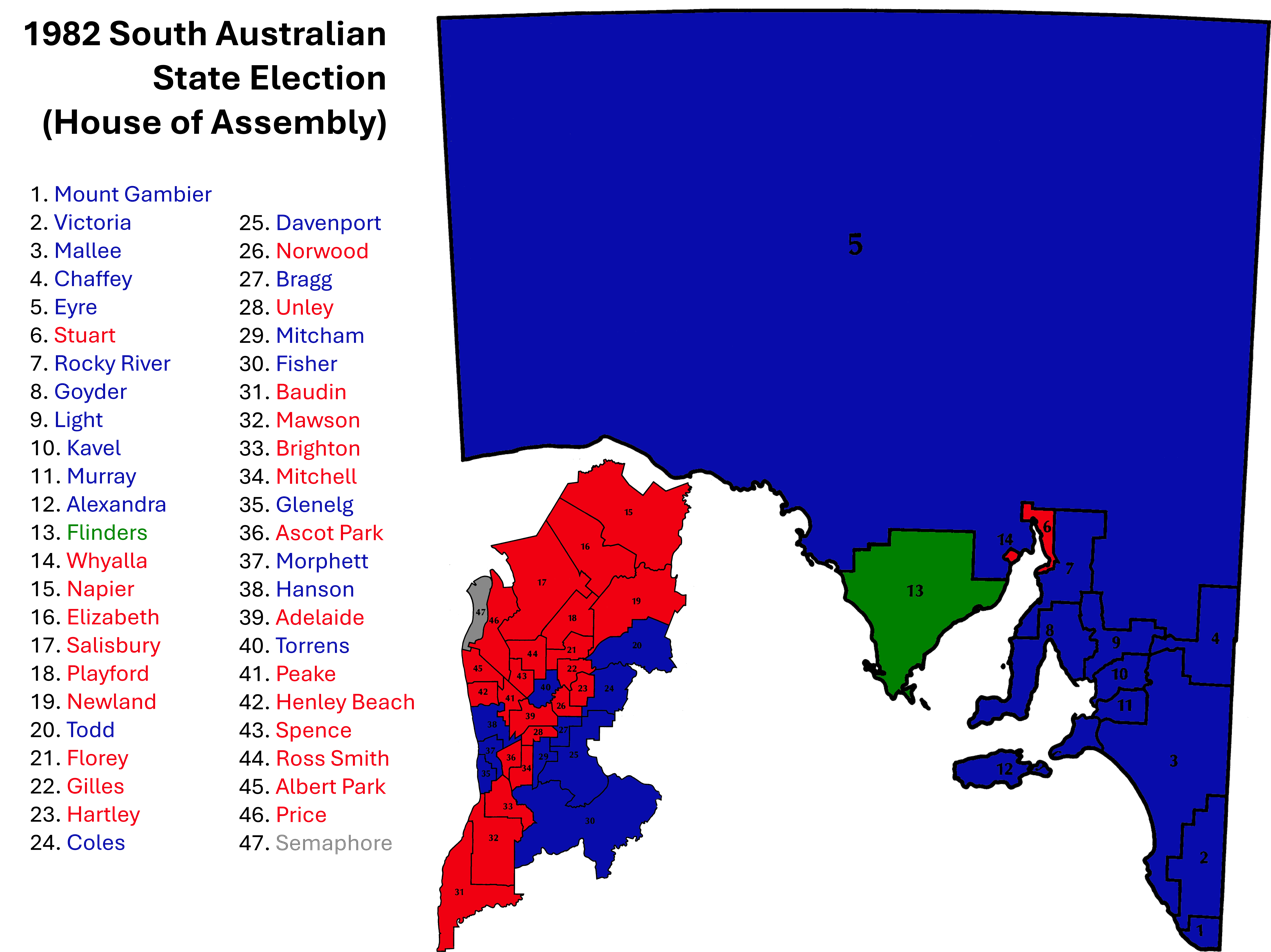
- Results by electoral division for the House of Assembly.
Premier before election
David Tonkin
Liberal
Elected Premier
John Bannon
Labor

State elections were held in South Australia on 6 November 1982. All 47 seats in the South Australian House of Assembly were up for election. The incumbent Liberal Party of Australia led by Premier of South Australia David Tonkin was defeated by the Australian Labor Party led by Leader of the Opposition John Bannon.

A referendum on daylight saving was held on the same day, and was passed.

== Background ==
Parliamentary elections for both houses of the Parliament of South Australia were held in South Australia in 1982, which saw John Bannon and the Australian Labor Party defeat the incumbent Liberal Party of Australia led by David Tonkin, after one term in power.

As Premier, Tonkin combined fiscal conservatism with socially progressive reforms. In the former, Tonkin made significant cuts to the public service, earning him the enmity of the unions, while an example of the latter was the passage of the land rights bill and the return to the Pitjantjatjara people of 10 per cent of South Australia's area.

Prior to the election, Tonkin removed Robin Millhouse (a former Liberal member who had defected to the Liberal Movement and then the Australian Democrats, and whose popularity enabled him to hold his seat of Mitcham) with an offer of a vacant seat in the Supreme Court. However the subsequent by-election saw the seat retained by Democrats candidate Heather Southcott.

One potential election factor was the copper and uranium mine at Olympic Dam, near Roxby Downs. Enabling legislation had been passed earlier in 1982, despite the opposition of the Labor Party, only when Norm Foster quit the Labor party to support it. Considered a controversial move in Labor circles, Bannon defused this as an election issue by promising that development would go ahead under a Labor government (a commitment which was honoured), despite having previously opposed it.

The Liberals also had to contend with the early 1980s recession.

== Summary ==
Labor achieved a 5.9% swing, and won 4 seats from the Liberals (Brighton, Henley Beach, Mawson and Newland). The Liberals won the seat of Mitcham from the Democrats, so overall lost 3 seats. The House of Assembly numbers were Labor 24, Liberal 21, National Party 1 and Independent Labor 1, giving Labor a narrow majority.

In the Legislative Council, Liberal and Labor won 5 seats each, and the Democrats 1; giving a chamber of 11 Liberal, 9 Labor and 2 Democrats. Labor lost one seat to the Democrats, but regained the seat they had lost when Norm Foster resigned from the Labor party earlier that year. Foster stood as an Independent Labor member in the Legislative Council, but was not re-elected.

== Aftermath ==
After the election loss, Tonkin resigned as Liberal leader and was succeeded by John Olsen, who won a leadership ballot against Dean Brown. A heart complaint caused Tonkin to leave parliament soon after at which a 1983 Bragg by-election was triggered, with the Liberals easily retaining the seat.

A 1984 Elizabeth by-election saw Independent Labor candidate Martyn Evans win the seat from Labor. This gave Labor a minority government (23 out of 47 seats), though it continued to govern with the support of Independent Labor members Evans and Norm Peterson.

== Key dates ==
- Issue of writ: 18 October 1982
- Close of nominations: 26 October 1982
- Polling day: 6 November 1982
- Return of writ: On or before 4 December 1982

== Results ==
=== House of Assembly ===
South Australian state election, 6 November 1982 House of Assembly << 1979–1985 >>
Enrolled voters	871,235				
Votes cast	811,783		Turnout	93.18	+0.14
Informal votes	46,921		Informal	5.78	+1.35
Summary of votes by party
Party	Primary votes	%	Swing	Seats	Change
Labor	353,999	46.28	+5.43	24	+4
Liberal	326,372	42.67	–5.27	21	–3
Democrats	54,457	7.12	–1.18	0	–1
National	17,782	2.32	+0.42	1	0
Independent	12,252	1.60	+0.60	1	0
Total	764,862			47	
Two-party-preferred
Labor	389,625	50.94	+5.94		
Liberal	375,237	49.06	–5.94		

=== Seats changing hands ===
Seat	Pre-1982			Swing	Post-1982		
Seat	Party	Member	Margin	Swing	Margin	Member	Party
Brighton	Liberal	Dick Glazbrook	4.7	5.5	0.8	June Appleby	Labor
Henley Beach	Liberal	Bob Randall	1.0	5.0	4.0	Don Ferguson	Labor
Mawson	Liberal	Ivar Schmidt	3.0	9.6	6.6	Susan Lenehan	Labor
Mitcham	Democrats	Heather Southcott	4.7	15.1	10.4	Stephen Baker	Liberal
Newland	Liberal	Brian Billard	6.2	9.8	3.6	John Klunder	Labor

=== Legislative Council ===
South Australian state election, 6 November, 1982 Legislative Council << 1979–1985 >>
Enrolled voters	871,215				
Votes cast	808,363		Turnout	92.8	+0.2
Informal votes	81,400		Informal	10.1	+5.7
Summary of votes by party
Party	Primary votes	%	Swing	Seats won	Seats held
Labor	345,936	47.6	+7.9	5	9
Liberal	301,090	41.4	–9.2	5	11
Democrats	40,405	5.6	–0.9	1	2
National	14,514	2.0	+0.9	0	0
Communist	11,837	1.6	+1.6	0	0
Other	13,181	1.8	*	0	0
Total	726,963			11	22

== Post-election pendulum ==
Labor seats (24)
Marginal
Brighton	June Appleby	ALP	0.8%
Newland	John Klunder	ALP	3.6%
Henley Beach	Don Ferguson	ALP	4.0%
Whyalla	Max Brown	ALP	4.1% v IND
Fairly safe
Mawson	Susan Lenehan	ALP	6.6%
Unley	Kym Mayes	ALP	6.6%
Norwood	Greg Crafter	ALP	9.1%
Ascot Park	John Trainer	ALP	9.3%
Hartley	Terry Groom	ALP	10.0%
Safe
Mitchell	Ron Payne	ALP	10.7%
Gilles	Jack Slater	ALP	10.7%
Albert Park	Kevin Hamilton	ALP	11.1%
Florey	Bob Gregory	ALP	13.2%
Playford	Terry McRae	ALP	14.7%
Adelaide	Jack Wright	ALP	15.6%
Price	George Whitten	ALP	16.1%
Baudin	Don Hopgood	ALP	16.2%
Napier	Terry Hemmings	ALP	19.2%
Peake	Keith Plunkett	ALP	19.5%
Elizabeth	Peter Duncan	ALP	20.0%
Stuart	Gavin Keneally	ALP	20.0%
Salisbury	Lynn Arnold	ALP	22.5%
Ross Smith	John Bannon	ALP	25.7%
Spence	Roy Abbott	ALP	27.9%

Liberal seats (21)
Marginal
Coles	Jennifer Adamson	LIB	1.3%
Todd	Scott Ashenden	LIB	1.4%
Morphett	John Oswald	LIB	1.5%
Mount Gambier	Harold Allison	LIB	2.2%
Torrens	Michael Wilson	LIB	4.5%
Fairly safe
Hanson	Heini Becker	LIB	8.2%
Fisher	Stan Evans	LIB	9.8%
Safe
Rocky River	John Olsen	LIB	10.3%
Mitcham	Stephen Baker	LIB	10.4% v AD
Murray	David Wotton	LIB	10.6%
Eyre	Graham Gunn	LIB	12.1%
Glenelg	John Mathwin	LIB	12.4%
Light	Bruce Eastick	LIB	15.2%
Chaffey	Peter Arnold	LIB	15.4%
Victoria	Allan Rodda	LIB	16.6%
Kavel	Roger Goldsworthy	LIB	16.7%
Bragg	David Tonkin	LIB	18.1%
Alexandra	Ted Chapman	LIB	19.0%
Goyder	John Meier	LIB	25.1%
Davenport	Dean Brown	LIB	26.5%
Mallee	Peter Lewis	LIB	30.0%
Crossbench seats (2)
Semaphore	Norm Peterson	IND	10.3% v ALP
Flinders	Peter Blacker	NAT	23.7% v ALP

== See also ==
- Results of the South Australian state election, 1982 (House of Assembly)
- Results of the 1982 South Australian state election (Legislative Council)
- Members of the South Australian House of Assembly, 1982-1985
- Members of the South Australian Legislative Council, 1982-1985
