= Results of the 1982 South Australian state election (Legislative Council) =

South Australian state election, 6 November, 1982 Legislative Council << 1979–1985 >>
Enrolled voters	871,215				
Votes cast	808,363		Turnout	92.8	+0.2
Informal votes	81,400		Informal	10.1	+5.7
Summary of votes by party
Party	Primary votes	%	Swing	Seats won	Seats held
Labor	345,936	47.6	+7.9	5	9
Liberal	301,090	41.4	–9.2	5	11
Democrats	40,405	5.6	–0.9	1	2
National	14,514	2.0	+0.9	0	0
Communist	11,837	1.6	+1.6	0	0
Other	13,181	1.8	*	0	0
Total	726,963			11	22

This is a list of results for the Legislative Council at the 1982 South Australian state election.

== Continuing members ==
The following MLCs were not up for re-election this year.

Member	Party	Term
John Burdett	Liberal	1979–1985
Legh Davis	Liberal	1979–1985
Ren DeGaris	Liberal	1979–1985
Trevor Griffin	Liberal	1979–1985
Robert Ritson	Liberal	1979–1985
Arthur Whyte	Liberal	1979–1985
Gordon Bruce	Labor	1979–1985
Brian Chatterton	Labor	1979–1985
Cec Creedon	Labor	1979–1985
Barbara Wiese	Labor	1979–1985
Lance Milne	Democrats	1979–1985

== Election results ==
1982 South Australian state election: Legislative Council
Party	Candidate	Votes	%	±%
Quota		60,581		
Labor	1. Chris Sumner (elected 1); 2. Anne Levy (elected 3); 3. John Cornwall (elected 5); 4. Frank Blevins (elected 7); 5. John Phillips; 6. Mario Feleppa (elected 9); 7. Colleen Hutchison; 8. Terry Roberts; 9. Michael Marinos; 10. Myles McCallum; 11. Kenneth Case	345,936	47.6	+7.9
Liberal	1. Murray Hill (elected 2); 2. Martin Cameron (elected 4); 3. Diana Laidlaw (elected 6); 4. Peter Dunn (elected 8); 5. Bruce Edwards; 6. Kent Andrew; 7. Rob Lucas (elected 10)	301,090	41.4	−9.2
Democrats	1. Ian Gilfillan (elected 11); 2. Donald Chisholm; 3. Peter Adamson; 4. John Longhurst; 5. Carolyn Tan; 6. Robert Manhire; 7. Raymond Buttery; 8. Patricia Shortridge; 9. Doone Lee; 10. Martin Holt; 11. Stuart Brasted	40,405	5.6	−0.9
National	1. Warwick Dunkley; 2. Pamela Ross; 3. Robin Dixon-Thompson; 4. Raymond Farrelly	14,514	2.0	+0.9
Communist	1. Peter Murphy; 2. Alan Bone	11,837	1.6	+1.6
Group F	1. Norm Foster; 2. Graham Jamieson	7,740	1.1	+1.1
Independent	Mark Eckermann	2,602	0.4	+0.4
Independent	Ted Dunstan	2,109	0.3	+0.3
Libertarian	Charmaine Rogers	730	0.1	+0.1
Total formal votes		726,963	89.9	−5.7
Informal votes		81,400	10.1	+5.7
Turnout		808,363	92.8	+0.2

== See also ==
- Candidates of the 1982 South Australian state election
- Members of the South Australian Legislative Council, 1982–1985
