= Electoral results for the district of Whyalla =

South Australian district election results

This is a list of election results for the electoral district of Whyalla in South Australian elections.

== Members for Whyalla ==
Member	Party	Term
Ron Loveday	Labor	1956–1970
Max Brown	Labor	1970–1985
Frank Blevins	Labor	1985–1993

== Election results ==
=== Elections in the 1980s ===
1989 South Australian state election: Whyalla
Party	Candidate	Votes	%	±%
Labor	Frank Blevins	7,806	51.1	−2.8
Liberal	Naomi Perry	3,884	25.5	+1.9
Independent	George Crowe	2,231	14.6	+14.6
Democrats	Rosemary Gloede	1,348	8.8	+6.7
Total formal votes		15,269	97.0	+0.7
Informal votes		479	3.0	−0.7
Turnout		15,748	94.0	+1.8
Two-party-preferred result
Labor	Frank Blevins	9,299	60.9	−6.1
Liberal	Naomi Perry	5,970	39.1	+6.1
Labor hold		Swing	−6.1	

1985 South Australian state election: Whyalla
Party	Candidate	Votes	%	±%
Labor	Frank Blevins	8,877	53.9	−7.1
Liberal	Laurie Wilks	3,890	23.6	+4.6
Independent Labor	Peter Murphy	2,780	16.9	+0.9
Democrats	Graham Gloede	345	2.1	+2.1
Independent	Andy Fleming	225	1.4	+1.4
Nuclear Disarmament	Jack Berry	193	1.2	+1.2
National	Fred Wilson	166	1.0	+1.0
Total formal votes		16,476	96.3	
Informal votes		633	3.7	
Turnout		17,109	92.2	
Two-party-preferred result
Labor	Frank Blevins	11,047	67.0	−8.0
Liberal	Laurie Wilks	5,429	33.0	+8.0
Labor hold		Swing	−8.0	

1982 South Australian state election: Whyalla
Party	Candidate	Votes	%	±%
Labor	Max Brown	7,356	49.1	−14.6
Independent	Peter Murphy	4,337	28.9	+28.9
Liberal	Vivienne Cruickshank	2,703	18.0	−11.8
Democrats	Mary Good	596	4.0	−1.0
Total formal votes		14,992	93.3	−1.2
Informal votes		1,079	6.7	+1.2
Turnout		16,071	90.5	−1.3
Two-candidate-preferred result
Labor	Max Brown	8,113	54.1	−12.6
Independent	Peter Murphy	6,879	45.9	+45.9
Labor hold		Swing	−12.6	

=== Elections in the 1970s ===
1979 South Australian state election: Whyalla
Party	Candidate	Votes	%	±%
Labor	Max Brown	9,173	63.7	−9.5
Liberal	Vivienne Cruickshank	4,296	29.8	+3.0
Democrats	Ella Smith	719	5.0	+5.0
Independent	David Sims	217	1.5	+1.5
Total formal votes		14,405	94.5	−1.6
Informal votes		835	5.5	+1.6
Turnout		15,240	91.8	−1.9
Two-party-preferred result
Labor	Max Brown	9,607	66.7	−6.5
Liberal	Vivienne Cruickshank	4,798	33.3	+6.5
Labor hold		Swing	−6.5	

1977 South Australian state election: Whyalla
Party	Candidate	Votes	%	±%
Labor	Max Brown	11,203	73.2	+5.0
Liberal	Vivienne Cruickshank	4,102	26.8	+8.9
Total formal votes		15,305	96.1	
Informal votes		615	3.9	
Turnout		15,920	93.7	
Labor hold		Swing	+2.9	

1975 South Australian state election: Whyalla
Party	Candidate	Votes	%	±%
Labor	Max Brown	6,735	66.4	−8.3
Liberal	Martinus Vette	1,879	18.5	−6.8
Liberal Movement	Arnold Eckersley	1,526	15.1	+15.1
Total formal votes		10,140	95.2	−1.5
Informal votes		513	4.8	+1.5
Turnout		10,653	92.6	+1.2
Two-party-preferred result
Labor	Max Brown	6,926	68.3	−6.4
Liberal	Martinus Vette	3,214	31.7	+6.4
Labor hold		Swing	−6.4	

1973 South Australian state election: Whyalla
Party	Candidate	Votes	%	±%
Labor	Max Brown	6,878	74.7	+17.8
Liberal and Country	Jason Reid	2,334	25.3	+13.1
Total formal votes		9,212	96.7	−0.7
Informal votes		316	3.3	+0.7
Turnout		9,528	91.4	−1.9
Labor hold		Swing	N/A	

1970 South Australian state election: Whyalla
Party	Candidate	Votes	%	±%
Labor	Max Brown	4,798	56.9	
Independent	Charles Ryan	2,144	25.4	
Liberal and Country	Lesley Nicolson	1,032	12.2	
Independent	Hugh James	463	5.5	
Total formal votes		8,437	97.4	
Informal votes		224	2.6	
Turnout		8,661	93.3	
Labor hold		Swing		

- Preferences were not distributed.

=== Elections in the 1960s ===
1968 South Australian state election: Whyalla
Party	Candidate	Votes	%	±%
Labor	Ron Loveday	9,268	75.1	−4.7
Liberal and Country	Colin Norton	3,072	24.9	+24.9
Total formal votes		12,340	96.5	+0.1
Informal votes		449	3.5	−0.1
Turnout		12,789	90.5	+2.9
Labor hold		Swing	N/A	

1965 South Australian state election: Whyalla
Party	Candidate	Votes	%	±%
Labor	Ron Loveday	7,589	79.8	−7.5
Democratic Labor	Gordon Kimpton	1,043	11.0	+11.0
Independent	Clarence Young	544	5.7	+5.7
Independent	James Yates	332	3.5	+3.5
Total formal votes		9,508	96.4	−0.5
Informal votes		348	3.6	+0.5
Turnout		9,856	87.6	−1.0
Two-candidate-preferred result
Labor	Ron Loveday	8,027	84.4	−2.9
Democratic Labor	Gordon Kimpton	1,481	15.6	+15.6
Labor hold		Swing	N/A	

1962 South Australian state election: Whyalla
Party	Candidate	Votes	%	±%
Labor	Ron Loveday	7,126	87.3	+2.4
Independent	Allan Mossop	1,033	12.7	−2.4
Total formal votes		8,159	96.9	+0.5
Informal votes		262	3.1	−0.5
Turnout		8,421	88.6	−0.2
Labor hold		Swing	+2.4	

=== Elections in the 1950s ===
1959 South Australian state election: Whyalla
Party	Candidate	Votes	%	±%
Labor	Ron Loveday	5,356	84.9	−15.1
Independent	Allan Mossop	956	15.1	+15.1
Total formal votes		6,312	96.4	
Informal votes		233	3.6	
Turnout		6,545	88.8	
Labor hold		Swing	N/A	

1956 South Australian state election: Whyalla
Party	Candidate	Votes	%	±%
Labor	Ron Loveday	unopposed		
Labor hold		Swing		
