= Electoral results for the district of Hayward =

South Australian district election results

This is a list of election results for the electoral district of Hayward in South Australian elections.

== Members for Hayward ==
Member	Party	Term
June Appleby	Labor	1985–1989
Mark Brindal	Liberal	1989–1993

== Election results ==
=== Elections in the 1980s ===
1989 South Australian state election: Hayward
Party	Candidate	Votes	%	±%
Liberal	Mark Brindal	7,266	43.6	−1.0
Labor	June Appleby	7,115	42.7	−7.4
Democrats	Elizabeth Williams	1,556	9.3	+4.1
Call to Australia	Reg Macey	450	2.7	+2.7
Independent	Mary Down	289	1.7	+1.7
Total formal votes		16,676	97.5	−0.2
Informal votes		423	2.5	+0.2
Turnout		17,099	95.4	+0.4
Two-party-preferred result
Liberal	Mark Brindal	8,495	50.9	+3.7
Labor	June Appleby	8,181	49.1	−3.7
Liberal gain from Labor		Swing	+3.7	

1985 South Australian state election: Hayward
Party	Candidate	Votes	%	±%
Labor	June Appleby	8,678	50.1	+3.1
Liberal	Julian Glynn	7,730	44.6	−2.4
Democrats	John Stapledon	908	5.2	−0.8
Total formal votes		17,316	97.7	
Informal votes		405	2.3	
Turnout		17,721	95.0	
Two-party-preferred result
Labor	June Appleby	9,146	52.8	+2.8
Liberal	Julian Glynn	8,170	47.2	−2.8
Labor hold		Swing	+2.8	
