= Donald Dunstan =

Donald Dunstan may refer to:

- Don Dunstan (1926–1999), Premier of South Australia
- Donald Dunstan (governor) (1923–2011), senior Army Officer and Governor of South Australia
