= Keith Seaman =

Governor of South Australia from 1977 to 1982

The Reverend Sir Keith Seaman KCVO OBE

Governor of South Australia
- In office 1 September 1977 – 28 March 1982
- Monarch: Elizabeth II
- Premier: Don Dunstan (1977–79); Des Corcoran (1979); David Tonkin (1979–82)
- Preceded by: Sir Douglas Nicholls
- Succeeded by: Sir Donald Dunstan

Personal details
- Born: 11 June 1920 McLaren Vale, South Australia
- Died: 30 June 2013 (aged 93) Tasmania, Australia

Sir Keith Douglas Seaman KCVO OBE (11 June 1920 – 30 June 2013) was Governor of South Australia from 1 September 1977 until 28 March 1982. He was the second successive governor to have been a minister of religion, Seaman being a minister in then recently merged Uniting Church in Australia.

== Life ==
Seaman was born in McLaren Vale, South Australia, on 11 June 1920. His father was Eli Semmens Seaman (1881-1956) and his mother was Ethel Maud Morgan (1883-1930). He was the 7th of their 8 children. His paternal grandfather, Philip Seaman (1841-1916), was born in Suffolk, UK, before migrating to South Australia and having 12 children.

Seaman attended Adelaide University. He enlisted in February 1940 and served in World War II as a flight lieutenant for the RAAF. After the war, he continued his studies of arts and laws part-time.

In 1954, he became an ordained Methodist minister in Renmark and worked at the Central Methodist Mission from 1958 to 1977. He eventually became superintendent of the Adelaide CMM (now Uniting Communities, formerly UnitingCare Wesley Adelaide), and in 1973 was a member of the National Commission on Social Welfare under Marie Coleman which was set up by Prime Minister Gough Whitlam.

Seaman was a conservative selection as governor. His term as governor was not without controversy. On 24 February 1978, The Advertiser in Adelaide reported that he was about to be dismissed. He was not, but was forced to admit that he had committed a "grave impropriety" prior to his appointment; it had been examined by the Uniting Church discipline committee and he had been allowed to continue his ministry.

== Personal life ==
Seaman married Joan Isabel Birbeck (5 November 1922 – 20 October 2008). They had 2 children and 10 grandchildren. While governor, he was made a Knight of the Royal Victorian Order (a British award) by Queen Elizabeth. He died at his home in Hobart in June 2013, aged 93.

Government offices
Preceded by Sir Douglas Nicholls	Governor of South Australia; 1977–1982	Succeeded by Lieutenant General Sir Donald Dunstan
