= Hugh Hudson (politician) =

Australian politician

The Honourable Hugh Hudson
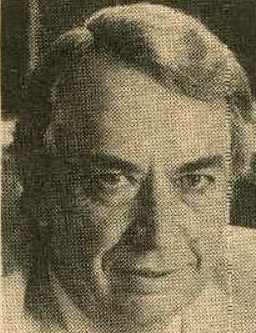

Deputy Premier of South Australia
- In office 15 March 1979 – 18 September 1979
- Premier: Des Corcoran
- Preceded by: Des Corcoran
- Succeeded by: Roger Goldsworthy

Deputy Leader of the South Australian Labor Party
- In office 15 March 1979 – 2 October 1979
- Leader: Des Corcoran
- Preceded by: Des Corcoran
- Succeeded by: Jack Wright

Minister of Education
- In office 6 June 1970 – 24 June 1975
- Premier: Don Dunstan
- Preceded by: John Coumbe
- Succeeded by: Don Hopgood

Minister for Planning and Housing
- In office 17 October 1975 – 15 March 1979
- Premier: Don Dunstan
- Preceded by: Joyce Steele
- Succeeded by: David Wotton
- In office 26 March 1968 – 16 April 1968
- Premier: Don Dunstan
- Preceded by: Frank Walsh
- Succeeded by: Glen Pearson

Member for Brighton
- In office 30 May 1970 – 14 September 1979
- Preceded by: district created
- Succeeded by: Dick Glazbrook

Member for Glenelg
- In office 6 March 1965 – 29 May 1970
- Preceded by: Baden Pattinson
- Succeeded by: John Mathwin

Personal details
- Born: Hugh Hudson; 12 December 1930 Croydon, South Australia
- Died: 11 May 1993 (aged 62)
- Party: Labor

Hugh Richard Hudson (12 December 1930 – 11 May 1993) was an Australian politician and 2nd Deputy Premier of South Australia in 1979. He was educated at North Sydney Boys High School and was a school teacher before entering politics. Hudson represented the House of Assembly seats of Glenelg from 1965 to 1970 and Brighton from 1970 to 1979 for the South Australian Branch of the Australian Labor Party. He held several ministries during his career, including being Minister of Education (1970–1975) during which time he was asked to deliver the 1976 Buntine Oration, which he titled "The Political Economy of Educational Advancement."

Political offices
Preceded by Des Corcoran	Deputy Premier of South Australia; 1979	Succeeded by Roger Goldsworthy
Parliament of South Australia
Preceded by Baden Pattinson	Member for Glenelg; 1965–1970	Succeeded by John Mathwin
New division	Member for Brighton; 1970–1979	Succeeded by Dick Glazbrook
