= Donald Dunstan (governor) =

Governor of South Australia from 1982 until 1991

Lieutenant General Sir Donald Dunstan AC, KBE, CB

30th Governor of South Australia
- In office 23 April 1982 – 5 February 1991
- Monarch: Elizabeth II
- Premier: David Tonkin (1982); John Bannon (1982–1991)
- Preceded by: Sir Keith Seaman
- Succeeded by: Dame Roma Mitchell

Personal details
- Born: Donald Beaumont Dunstan; 18 February 1923 Murray Bridge, South Australia
- Died: 15 October 2011 (aged 88) Adelaide, South Australia
- Education: Royal Military College, Duntroon
- Profession: Soldier

Military service
- Allegiance: Australia
- Branch/service: Australian Army
- Years of service: 1940–1982
- Rank: Lieutenant General
- Commands: Chief of the General Staff (1977–82); Field Forces (1974–77); Australian Forces Vietnam (1971–72); 10th Task Force (1969–70); 1st Australian Task Force (1968–69); 1st Battalion, Royal Australian Regiment (1964–65)
- Battles/wars: Second World War; Korean War; Vietnam War
- Awards: Companion of the Order of Australia; Knight Commander of the Order of the British Empire; Companion of the Order of the Bath; Mentioned in Despatches; Officer of the National Order of Vietnam; Cross of Gallantry with Palm (Vietnam)

Lieutenant General Sir Donald Beaumont Dunstan AC, KBE, CB (18 February 1923 – 15 October 2011) was an Australian Army officer who was Governor of South Australia from 23 April 1982 until 5 February 1991. A career officer, after joining the Army in 1940 during the Second World War, Dunstan graduated from the Royal Military College, Duntroon in 1942 and served as an infantry officer, seeing combat against the Japanese during the Bougainville Campaign in 1945. After the war, he served in a variety of appointments, including as commander of the 1st Australian Task Force during the Vietnam War. From 1977 to 1982 he held the appointment of Chief of the General Staff, before retiring from the Army having overseen a large-scale re-organisation. Afterwards, he became the longest-serving governor of South Australia. He died in 2011, at the age of 88.

== Military career ==
Born in Murray Bridge, South Australia, on 18 February 1923, Dunstan joined the Australian Army and was accepted into the Royal Military College, Duntroon in February 1940 amidst the backdrop of the Second World War. A career officer, after graduating from Duntroon in June 1942, having completed a cut-down 18-month version of the normally four-year course, Dunstan was allocated to the infantry and posted to the 27th Battalion, a South Australian Militia unit known as the South Australian Scottish Regiment. He subsequently served with the 27th until the end of the war, except for a brief period when he was seconded to headquarters 23rd Brigade.

With the 27th Battalion, Dunstan saw combat against the Japanese during the Bougainville Campaign in 1945, and received a Mention in Despatches for his actions while commanding a platoon. After the war, he served as a staff officer in the British Commonwealth Occupation Force in Japan following the war, transferring to the newly established Australian Regular Army in 1947. Upon returning to Australia in 1948, Dunstan married Beryl Dunningham and was posted to Keswick Barracks in Adelaide, South Australia, where he served on the staff of the 4th Military District.

Dunstan was then posted to the 1st Battalion, Royal Australian Regiment (1 RAR) as second-in-command in 1953. He then saw service in Korea including a period as Military Assistant to the Commander in Chief of the British Commonwealth Forces Korea, and was appointed a Member of the Order of the British Empire in the 1954 New Year Honours. Between May 1964 and February 1965, Dunstan commanded 1 RAR, before later holding an appointment at the 1st Recruit Training Battalion. Having reached the rank of colonel, in early 1968 he was deployed to Vietnam as deputy commander of the 1st Australian Task Force (1 ATF). He took over from Brigadier Ron Hughes as Commander of the 1 ATF on 21 May 1968 during the Battle of Coral–Balmoral. For his services during this battle, he was appointed a Commander of the Order of the British Empire in 1969.

That year he returned to Australia and on promotion to brigadier took over the 10th Task Force, which was based in New South Wales. He attended the Imperial Defence College in London in 1970 and afterwards he was promoted to major general and appointed Commander of Australian Forces in Vietnam. He remained in the country throughout 1971 and 1972 and oversaw the withdrawal of Australian forces, for which he was appointed a Companion of the Order of the Bath, an Officer of the National Order of Vietnam and awarded the Vietnamese Cross of Gallantry with Palm.

His next appointments were Chief of Materiel in Army Headquarters (1972–74) and General Officer Commanding Field Forces (1974–77). In 1977, having been raised to the rank of lieutenant general, he became Chief of the General Staff (CGS), being extended in that capacity twice before retiring from the Army in 1982. During his time as CGS, Dunstan reorganised the Army around the concept of specialised brigades and worked to improve the readiness of Army units to meet rapidly developing threats. This work later proved pivotal in ensuring the success of the Australian intervention in East Timor in 1999. His service as service chief was recognised by his appointment as a Knight Commander of the Order of the British Empire in 1980.

== Later life ==
Following his retirement from the Army, Dunstan returned to South Australia, assuming the appointment of Governor of South Australia in April 1982. The longest holder of that appointment, he retired from the role in February 1991. For his work, he was made a Companion of the Order of Australia that same year. He died in Adelaide on 15 October 2011, and was given a state funeral.

== Honours and awards ==

Companion of the Order of Australia (AC)	26 January 1991	In recognition of service to the Crown as Governor of South Australia.
Knight Commander of the British Empire (KBE)	31 December 1979	For service as Chief of the General Staff
Companion of the Order of the Bath (CB)	20 November 1972	For service to Staff Corps - Vietnam
Knight of the Order of Saint John	22 April 1982	
1939–45 Star		
Pacific Star		
Defence Medal		
War Medal 1939–45		With Mentioned in Dispatches device.
Australia Service Medal 1939–45		
Australian Active Service Medal 1945–75		
United Nations Service Medal for Korea		
Vietnam Medal		
Australian Service Medal 1945-75		
Queen Elizabeth II Silver Jubilee Medal		
Centenary Medal	1 January 2001	
Defence Long Service Medal		
National Medal	14 July 1977	With two clasps.
Officer of the National Order of Vietnam (South Vietnam)		
Republic of Vietnam Gallantry Cross (South Vietnam)		With Palm device.
Republic of Vietnam Campaign Medal (South Vietnam)		

Military offices
Preceded by Lieutenant General Arthur MacDonald	Chief of the General Staff; 1977–1982	Succeeded by Lieutenant General Sir Phillip Bennett
Government offices
Preceded by Sir Keith Seaman	Governor of South Australia; 1982–1991	Succeeded by Dame Roma Mitchell
