= Baden Pattinson =

Australian politician

The Honourable Sir Baden Pattinson KBE
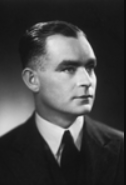

Minister of Education
- In office 15 December 1953 – 10 March 1965
- Premier: Tom Playford
- Preceded by: Reginald Rudall
- Succeeded by: Ron Loveday

Member for Glenelg
- In office 8 March 1947 – 5 March 1965
- Preceded by: Frank Smith
- Succeeded by: Hugh Hudson

Member for the Yorke Peninsula
- In office 5 April 1930 – 18 March 1938
- Preceded by: Henry Tossell
- Succeeded by: Daniel Davies

Personal details
- Born: Baden Pattinson; 22 December 1899 Thebarton, South Australia
- Died: 17 December 1978 (aged 78) Glenelg, South Australia
- Party: Liberal and Country League
- Spouse: Florence Doman (m.1926)

Sir Baden Pattinson KBE (22 December 1899 – 17 December 1978) was an Australian politician who represented the South Australian House of Assembly seats of Yorke Peninsula from 1930 to 1938 and Glenelg from 1947 to 1965 for the Liberal and Country League.

In 1962 Pattinson was appointed a Knight Commander of the Order of the British Empire (KBE).

Parliament of South Australia
Preceded by Frank Smith	Member for Glenelg; 1947–1965	Succeeded by Hugh Hudson
