= Frank Smith (South Australian politician) =

Australian politician

Frank Smith (3 May 1888 – 3 July 1948) was an Australian politician who represented the South Australian House of Assembly seat of Glenelg from 1941 to 1947 for the Liberal and Country League.

Parliament of South Australia
Preceded by William Fisk	Member for Glenelg; 1941–1947	Succeeded by Baden Pattinson
