= William Fisk (politician) =

Australian politician

William Fisk (17 July 1871 – 18 December 1940) was an Australian politician who represented the South Australian House of Assembly seat of Glenelg from 1938 to 1940 as an independent.

Fisk was born in Adelaide, and studied at Whinham College, the South Australian School of Mines and the University of Adelaide. He undertook an apprenticeship in pharmacy and dentistry in 1885 before becoming manager of a chemist in Jetty Road, Glenelg, subsequently taking over the business himself. He was mayor of the Corporate Town of Glenelg from 1931 to 1938, at the time the longest-serving mayor in Glenelg's history. He was a prominent advocate for the construction of the Anzac Highway. Fisk also served on the executive of the Pharmacy Board of South Australia, the council of the Pharmaceutical Society, and the State Centenary Executive, and was president of the Glenelg Optimist Society and captain of the Henley Cricket Club. He was known locally as "the Village Apothecary".

Fisk was elected to the House of Assembly as the independent member for Glenelg at the 1938 election. He was one of 14 of 39 independent MPs elected to the House at that election, which as a grouping won 40 percent of the primary vote, more than either of the major parties. He clashed vocally with prominent rural independent Tom Stott in the aftermath, having fallen out over Fisk's failed candidacy for chairman of committees. He also voted in support of the retention of five-year terms, differing from most of the other independents on a key issue. Fisk opposed the reintroduction of the Holdfast Bay railway line, labelling advocates "nitwits" He also ended the prosecution of "topless" male bathers for wearing trunks at Glenelg beach, and unsuccessfully advocated for the construction of an airport at Glenelg.

Fisk died in office in December 1940, after having been ill for several weeks, and was buried at North Brighton Cemetery.

Parliament of South Australia
New district	Member for Glenelg; 1938–1940	Succeeded by Frank Smith
