= 1982 Mitcham state by-election =

- 8 May 1982

Electoral district of Mitcham in the South Australian House of Assembly
- Turnout: 85.5% (▼8.0)

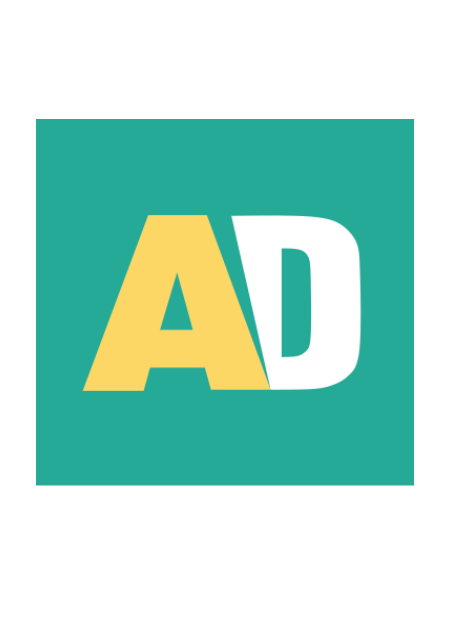

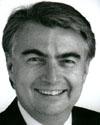
| | First party | Second party | Third party |
|---|---|---|---|
| Candidate | Robert Worth | Heather Southcott | John Hill |
| Party | Liberal | Democrats | Labor |
| Primary vote | 6,461 | 3,084 | 3,367 |
| Percentage | 45.9% | 25.9% | 23.9% |
| Swing | ▲8.6 | ▼19.2 | ▲6.6 |
| 2PP | 49.7% | 50.3% |
| 2PP swing | ▲4.4 | ▼4.4 |
MP before election
Robin Millhouse
Democrats
Elected MP
Heather Southcott
Democrats

The 1982 Mitcham state by-election was held on 8 May 1982 to elect the member for Mitcham in the South Australian House of Assembly.

The by-election was triggered by the resignation of former state Democrats MHA Robin Millhouse. The Liberal Party was expected to win the seat, but Democrats candidate Heather Southcott was heavily favoured by Labor party preferences, and was a surprise winner.

The Liberals won the seat six months later at the 1982 state election.

== Results ==
The Australia Party, who contested the previous election and gained 0.3 percent, did not contest the by-election. The Democrats retained the seat by 45 votes.

1982 Mitcham state by-election
| Party | Candidate | Votes | % | ±% |
|---|---|---|---|---|
| Liberal | Robert Worth | 6,461 | 45.9 | +8.6 |
| Democrats | Heather Southcott | 3,653 | 25.9 | −19.2 |
| Labor | John Hill | 3,367 | 23.9 | +6.6 |
| National | Ross Osmond | 543 | 3.8 | +3.8 |
| Libertarian | Victor Kirby | 66 | 0.5 | +0.5 |
| Total formal votes | | 14,090 | 98.0 | −0.1 |
| Informal votes | | 286 | 2.0 | +0.1 |
| Turnout | | 14,376 | 85.5 | −8.0 |
Two-candidate-preferred result
| Democrats | Heather Southcott | 7,090 | 50.3 | −4.4 |
| Liberal | Robert Worth | 7,000 | 49.7 | +4.4 |
| Democrats hold | | | | |

== See also ==
- List of South Australian House of Assembly by-elections
