= 1983 Bragg state by-election =

A by-election was held for the South Australian House of Assembly seat of Bragg on 14 May 1983. This was triggered by the resignation of former premier and state Liberal MHA David Tonkin. The seat had been retained by the Liberals since it was created and first contested at the 1970 state election.

== Results ==
The Liberals easily retained the seat.

Bragg state by-election, 14 May 1983
Party	Candidate	Votes	%	±%
Liberal	Graham Ingerson	7,969	62.6	−0.4
Labor	Carolyn Pickles	3,150	24.8	−2.1
Democrats	Guy Harley	1,559	12.6	+2.5
Total formal votes		12,718	98.2	+2.3
Informal votes		237	1.8	−2.3
Turnout		12,955	78.5	−14.8
Liberal hold		Swing	N/A	

== See also ==
- List of South Australian state by-elections
