= Electoral district of Brighton (South Australia) =

Former South Australian state electoral district

Coordinates: 35°2′30″S 138°30′35″E

Brighton South Australia—House of Assembly
- State: South Australia
- Created: 1970
- Abolished: 1985
- Namesake: Brighton, South Australia
- Demographic: Metropolitan

Brighton was an electoral district of the House of Assembly in the Australian state of South Australia from 1970 to 1985. Brighton was replaced by the seat of Bright at the 1985 election.

== Members ==
Member	Party	Term
Hugh Hudson	Labor	1970–1979
Dick Glazbrook	Liberal	1979–1982
June Appleby	Labor	1982–1985

== Election results ==
=== Elections in the 1980s ===
1982 South Australian state election: Brighton
Party	Candidate	Votes	%	±%
Labor	June Appleby	8,486	47.3	+6.3
Liberal	Dick Glazbrook	8,192	45.6	−3.1
Democrats	Bob Ralph	1,272	7.1	−3.2
Total formal votes		17,950	95.8	−0.8
Informal votes		792	4.2	+0.8
Turnout		18,742	94.3	+0.8
Two-party-preferred result
Labor	June Appleby	9,123	50.8	+5.5
Liberal	Dick Glazbrook	8,827	49.2	−5.5
Labor gain from Liberal		Swing	+5.5	

=== Elections in the 1970s ===
1979 South Australian state election: Brighton
Party	Candidate	Votes	%	±%
Liberal	Dick Glazbrook	8,195	48.7	+14.4
Labor	Hugh Hudson	6,908	41.0	−11.6
Democrats	Ronald Moulds	1,731	10.3	−2.8
Total formal votes		16,834	96.6	−1.9
Informal votes		600	3.4	+1.9
Turnout		17,434	93.5	−1.2
Two-party-preferred result
Liberal	Dick Glazbrook	9,209	54.7	+12.5
Labor	Hugh Hudson	7,625	45.3	−12.5
Liberal gain from Labor		Swing	+12.5	

1977 South Australian state election: Brighton
Party	Candidate	Votes	%	±%
Labor	Hugh Hudson	8,911	52.6	−0.6
Liberal	Natalie Richardson	5,822	34.3	+13.1
Democrats	Ronald Moulds	2,224	13.1	+13.1
Total formal votes		16,957	98.5	
Informal votes		256	1.5	
Turnout		17,213	94.7	
Two-party-preferred result
Labor	Hugh Hudson	9,848	58.1	+1.3
Liberal	Natalie Richardson	7,109	41.9	−1.3
Labor hold		Swing	+1.3	

1975 South Australian state election: Brighton
Party	Candidate	Votes	%	±%
Labor	Hugh Hudson	9,394	51.3	−8.8
Liberal	Ursula Pridham	4,394	24.0	−12.0
Liberal Movement	Ronald Moulds	4,169	22.8	+22.8
Independent	Sydney Monks	342	1.9	+1.9
Total formal votes		18,299	97.3	−0.8
Informal votes		333	1.9	+0.8
Turnout		18,814	94.1	−0.8
Two-party-preferred result
Labor	Hugh Hudson	9,845	53.8	−8.2
Liberal	Ursula Pridham	8,454	46.2	+8.2
Labor hold		Swing	−8.2	

1973 South Australian state election: Brighton
Party	Candidate	Votes	%	±%
Labor	Hugh Hudson	10,099	60.1	+6.2
Liberal and Country	Ronald Moulds	6,045	36.0	−6.5
Independent	Betty Preston	656	3.9	+3.9
Total formal votes		16,800	98.1	−0.7
Informal votes		333	1.9	+0.7
Turnout		17,133	94.9	−1.2
Two-party-preferred result
Labor	Hugh Hudson	10,416	62.0	+7.5
Liberal and Country	Ronald Moulds	6,384	38.0	−7.5
Labor hold		Swing	+7.5	

1970 South Australian state election: Brighton
Party	Candidate	Votes	%	±%
Labor	Hugh Hudson	8,471	53.9	
Liberal and Country	Kenneth Griffin	6,679	42.5	
Democratic Labor	Ted Farrell	557	3.6	
Total formal votes		15,707	98.8	
Informal votes		186	1.2	
Turnout		15,893	96.1	
Two-party-preferred result
Labor	Hugh Hudson	8,555	54.5	
Liberal and Country	Kenneth Griffin	7,152	45.5	
Labor hold		Swing		
