= 1984 Elizabeth state by-election =

A by-election was held for the South Australian House of Assembly seat of Elizabeth on 1 December 1984. This was triggered by the resignation of former state Labor MHA Peter Duncan, who moved to the federal seat of Makin. The seat had been retained by Labor since it was created and first contested at the 1970 state election.

== Results ==
Independent Labor candidate Martyn Evans won the seat from Labor.

Elizabeth state by-election, 1 December 1984
Party	Candidate	Votes	%	±%
Independent Labor	Martyn Evans	7,376	43.9	+43.9
Labor	Raymond Roe	5,766	34.3	−30.0
Liberal	Josephine Gapper	2,601	15.5	−8.9
Democrats	Barbara Barlow	1,066	6.3	−5.1
Total formal votes		16,809	93.5	+1.9
Informal votes		1,158	6.5	−1.9
Turnout		17,967	86.1	−5.8
Two-candidate-preferred result
Independent Labor	Martyn Evans	10,743	63.9	N/A
Labor	Raymond Roe	6,066	36.1	N/A
Independent Labor gain from Labor		Swing	N/A	

Evans would hold Elizabeth until 1994 when he resigned to move into federal politics, the same reason why his predecessor Duncan vacated Elizabeth in 1984.

This meant that both 1984 and 1994 by-elections were triggered by the resignation of the sitting member in order to move into federal politics.

== See also ==
- List of South Australian state by-elections
