= Heather Southcott =

Australian politician

Heather Joyce Southcott, AM (15 November 1928 – 21 November 2014) was an Australian politician, representing the South Australian House of Assembly seat of Mitcham (now Waite) for the Australian Democrats. She was the first woman to lead a parliamentary political party in Australia.

Southcott was born Heather Joyce Miller in Adelaide, a daughter of Gavin Robert Miller and Ivy Ilean Miller, née Twelftree (married 1917). She graduated with a pharmacy degree from the University of Adelaide. She initially worked at the Adelaide Repatriation Hospital; however, following her marriage in 1952 (to Ronald Vernon Southcott) she was obliged to resign from the public service and she subsequently continued her career in private retail pharmacy work. She was a co-founder of the Women Pharmacists Group and was involved in numerous organisations, including the National Council of Women, Women's Electoral Lobby and the Electoral Reform Society.

Southcott joined the Liberal and Country League in the 1960s, but resigned in 1973 as part of the split that formed the Liberal Movement. She did not rejoin the LCL when the LM was reabsorbed into the party in 1976, but rather followed Robin Millhouse into the New LM and then in 1977 into its successor party, the Democrats. She was a prominent party official in South Australia from the party's early days, serving on the national executive for several years, becoming a key supporter of Senator Janine Haines, and serving as both state secretary and national deputy president at the time of her own election to parliament.

She entered parliament at a May 1982 by-election upon the resignation of Millhouse, then the Democrats' sole House of Assembly MP and state leader. She was defeated by Liberal candidate Stephen Baker, at the state election six months later.

During her six months in parliament, she served as the party's state parliamentary leader, which would make her the first woman to lead an Australian parliamentary political party; however Lance Milne is also given as the Democrats' leader at that time.

After leaving parliamentary politics, she was a long-serving National President of the Democrats.

She was made a Member of the Order of Australia (AM) in June 1991 for service to the community, particularly in the field of women's affairs. She was the great-aunt of Liberal Party parliamentarian Andrew Southcott.

== See also ==
- Women and government in Australia
- Women in the South Australian House of Assembly
