= David Tonkin =

Australian politician (1929 – 2000)

The Honourable Dr David Tonkin AO

38th Premier of South Australia
- In office 18 September 1979 – 10 November 1982
- Monarch: Elizabeth II
- Governor: Sir Keith Seaman; Sir Donald Dunstan
- Deputy: Roger Goldsworthy
- Preceded by: Des Corcoran
- Succeeded by: John Bannon

Leader of the Opposition in South Australia
- In office 24 July 1975 – 18 September 1979
- Deputy: Roger Goldsworthy
- Preceded by: Bruce Eastick
- Succeeded by: John Bannon

Leader of the South Australian Liberal Party
- In office 24 July 1975 – 10 November 1982
- Deputy: Roger Goldsworthy
- Preceded by: Bruce Eastick
- Succeeded by: John Olsen

Treasurer of South Australia
- In office 18 September 1979 – 10 November 1982
- Premier: Himself
- Preceded by: Des Corcoran
- Succeeded by: John Bannon

Member for Bragg
- In office 30 May 1970 – 10 April 1983
- Preceded by: Seat established
- Succeeded by: Graham Ingerson

Personal details
- Born: David Oliver Tonkin; 20 July 1929 Unley, South Australia, Australia
- Died: 2 October 2000 (aged 71) Mengler Hill, South Australia
- Party: Liberal Party of Australia (SA)
- Parent(s): Oliver Athelstone Prisk Tonkin; Bertha Ida Louisa Kennett

David Oliver Tonkin AO (20 July 1929 – 2 October 2000) was an Australian politician who served as the 38th Premier of South Australia from 18 September 1979 to 10 November 1982. He was elected to the House of Assembly seat of Bragg at the 1970 election, serving until 1983. He became the leader of the South Australian Division of the Liberal Party of Australia in 1975, replacing Bruce Eastick. Initially leading the party to defeat at the 1977 election against the Don Dunstan Labor government, his party won the 1979 election against the Des Corcoran Labor government. Following the 1980 Norwood by-election the Tonkin government was reduced to a one-seat majority. His government's policy approach combined economic conservatism with social progressivism. The Tonkin Liberal government was defeated after one term at the 1982 election by Labor led by John Bannon.

== Early life ==
David Tonkin was born in Unley, South Australia, on 20 July 1929. When he was five, his father, Oliver, died, leaving Tonkin's mother, Bertha, to raise him. Tonkin attended local public schools before gaining a scholarship to St Peter's College. Accepted into Medicine at the University of Adelaide, Tonkin worked as a taxi driver while completing his degree and practised as a General Practitioner before undertaking a postgraduate ophthalmology course in London. He established a practice in Adelaide and was soon considered one of the city's leading eye surgeons. Tonkin was of Cornish ancestry.

Tonkin's dedication to aiding the wider community was manifest through his honorary service as an eye surgeon to Adelaide public hospitals and through the initiation, through the Lions Club, of Australia's first public screening programme for glaucoma. In 1962, Tonkin became executive director of the Australian Foundation for Prevention of Blindness SA Inc.

== Career ==
From a young age, Tonkin was a supporter of the Liberal and Country League (LCL), handing out how-to-vote cards at the 1939 election for the party. His prominence in Adelaide society and his community service made him an ideal LCL candidate. In 1968, he unsuccessfully challenged Premier Don Dunstan in Dunstan's seat of Norwood before becoming the first member for the adjacent seat of Bragg at the 1970 election.

Tonkin quickly gained a reputation as a progressive member of the LCL. He was an early supporter of the Liberal Movement faction created by former premier Steele Hall, although Tonkin remained with the LCL when the Liberal Movement split from it.

Tonkin gained statewide prominence in 1974, when he successfully introduced a private member's bill to outlaw sex discrimination, the first such law in Australia. A year later, this prominence led him to challenge Bruce Eastick for the leadership of what by then had become the South Australia branch of the Liberal Party. Tonkin became leader after Eastick stood aside.

As leader, Tonkin worked toward healing the internal party wounds by coaxing the Liberal Movement back into the Liberal fold. Although the Liberals lost the 1977 election (Dunstan's government remained fairly popular with voters, and memories of the LCL split were still vivid), they easily won the 1979 election against Labor, briefly led by Des Corcoran. At that election, the Liberals won 55 percent of the two-party vote on a swing of over eight percent. At the time, this was the largest two-party victory for any party since the end of the Playmander, exceeding Labor taking 54.5 percent in 1973. While this would have normally been enough for a strong majority government in the rest of Australia, the Liberals won only 13 seats in Adelaide. As a result, they only won 25 of 47 seats, just two more than needed to govern alone. Even so, it was the first time that the main non-Labor party in South Australia had won a majority of the two-party vote while also winning the most seats since its predecessor, the LCL, won 50.3 percent of the two-party vote in 1959.

Already governing on a knife-edge, Tonkin's majority became even slimmer in 1980 after a court decision threw out a Liberal victory in Dunstan's old seat Norwood, and Labor regained it in the ensuing by-election. As a result, Tonkin found himself with a bare majority of one seat.

=== Premier ===
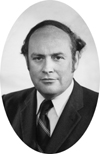
Tonkin in 1970

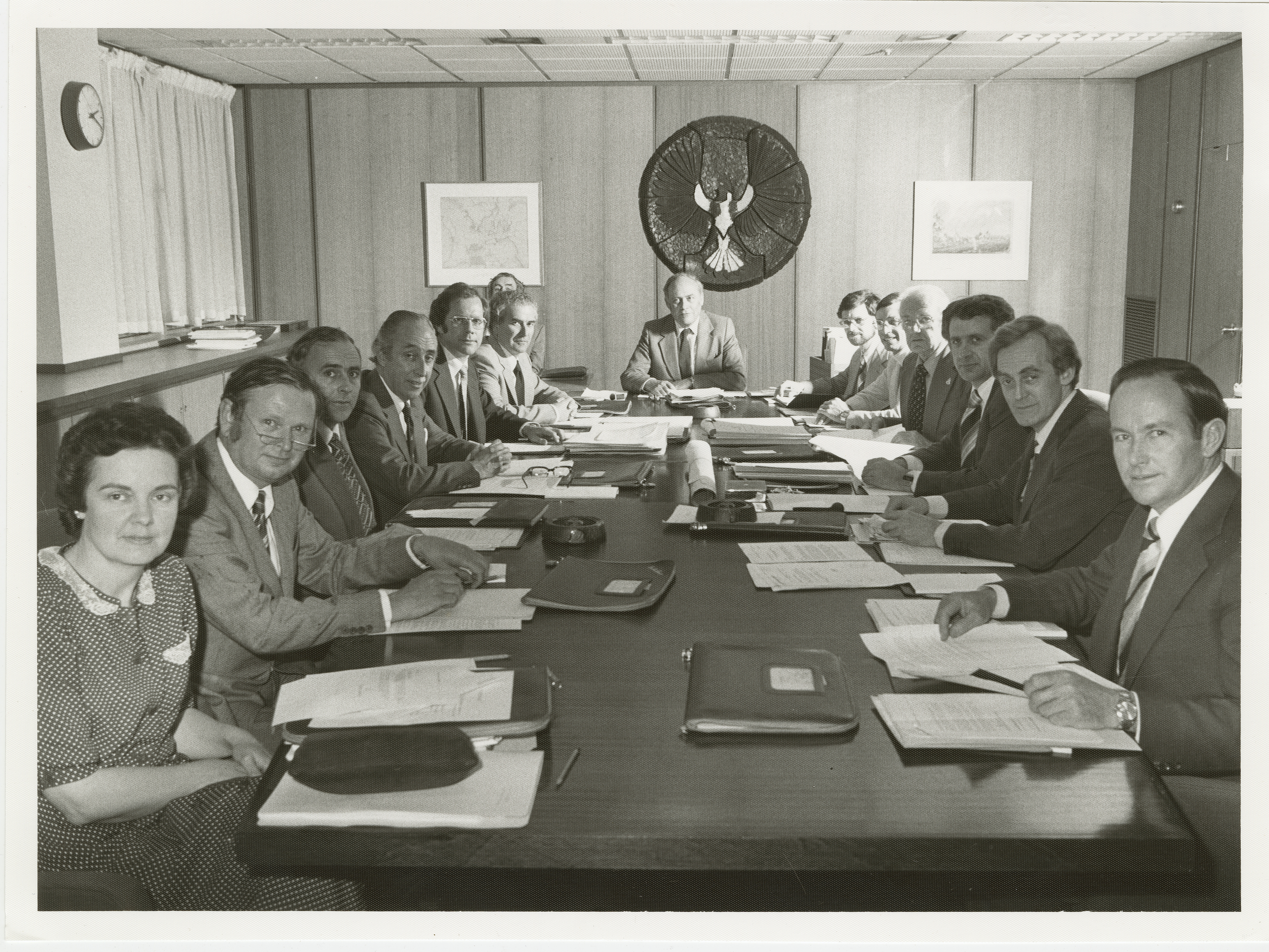
1979 Cabinet of South Australian Tonkin Government

Also serving as his own state Treasurer, Tonkin combined fiscal conservatism with implementing socially progressive reforms. In the former, Tonkin made significant cuts to the public service, earning him the enmity of the unions, while an example of the latter was the passage of the land rights bill and the return to the Pitjantjatjara people of 10 per cent of South Australia's area.

Other significant actions include the development of the copper and uranium mine at Olympic Dam (Roxby Downs), extending his earlier anti-discrimination provisions to include physical disability, establishing the Ethnic Affairs Commission and introducing random breath testing (RBT).

Bidding for re-election at the 1982 election, Tonkin had support of the South Australian media. However, the economy was hit by the early 1980s recession. The government suffered a large swing at the 1982 Florey state by-election before narrowly losing the state election two months later to Labor led by John Bannon. Tonkin resigned from parliament shortly after following a heart complaint. Graham Ingerson easily retained the seat for the Liberals at the ensuing by-election.

Until the defeat of Steven Marshall in 2022, Tonkin was the only non-Labor Premier to have served for at least a full term since the main non-Labor party in South Australia adopted the Liberal banner.

== After politics ==
Subsequently, Tonkin returned to ophthalmology and served in various capacities in different government and community organisations, including chairman of the board of the State Opera from 1985 to 1986 and vice-president of Sturt Football Club. In 1986, he assumed the London-based position of Secretary-General of the Commonwealth Parliamentary Association.

Returning to Australia in 1992, Tonkin was made an Officer of the Order of Australia in 1993 and served as chairman of the South Australian Film Corporation from 1994 to 1996. A stroke in 1996 permanently affected his speech and forced him into retirement.

Tonkin was awarded the Liberal Party's outstanding achievement award in 2000 by Prime Minister John Howard and died in his sleep at Mengler Hill, Barossa Valley, South Australia, on 2 October 2000 while attending a music festival. He was survived by his wife Prue, six children and 10 grandchildren.

Following his death, the Pitjantjatjara people paid tribute to Tonkin, stating that no Liberal politician had done as much for Aboriginal people. Others stated that he lost the 1982 election because he lacked the ruthlessness required of successful politicians.

The Board Room in the Bragg Electorate Office is named in his honour. In addition, a Memorial Dinner in his name is also now held each year by The South Australian Young Liberal Movement.

== Notes ==
Political offices
Preceded by Bruce Eastick	Leader of the Opposition of South Australia; 1975 – 1979	Succeeded by John Bannon
Preceded by Des Corcoran	Premier of South Australia; 1979 – 1982	Succeeded by John Bannon
Preceded by Des Corcoran	Treasurer of South Australia; 1979 – 1982	Succeeded by John Bannon
Parliament of South Australia
New division	Member for Bragg; 1970–1983	Succeeded by Graham Ingerson
Party political offices
Preceded by Bruce Eastick	Leader of the Liberal Party of Australia (South Australian Division); 1975 – 1982	Succeeded by John Olsen
