= Dick Glazbrook =

Australian politician

Richard Eric Glazbrook (born 8 February 1940) was an Australian politician who represented the South Australian House of Assembly seat of Brighton from 1979 to 1982 for the Liberal Party.

Parliament of South Australia
Preceded by Hugh Hudson	Member for Brighton; 1979–1982	Succeeded by June Appleby
