= Frank Blevins =

Australian politician (1939–2013)

The Honourable Frank Blevins

Deputy Premier of South Australia
- In office 4 September 1992 – 14 December 1993
- Premier: Lynn Arnold
- Preceded by: Don Hopgood
- Succeeded by: Stephen Baker

Deputy Leader of the South Australian Labor Party
- In office 4 September 1992 – 14 December 1993
- Leader: Lynn Arnold
- Preceded by: Don Hopgood
- Succeeded by: Mike Rann

Treasurer of South Australia
- In office 4 September 1992 – 14 December 1993
- Premier: Lynn Arnold
- Preceded by: John Bannon
- Succeeded by: Stephen Baker

Member for Giles
- In office 11 December 1993 – 10 October 1997
- Preceded by: New District
- Succeeded by: Lyn Breuer

Member for Whyalla
- In office 7 December 1985 – 10 December 1993
- Preceded by: Maxwell Brown
- Succeeded by: District Abolished

Member of the Legislative Council of South Australia
- In office 12 July 1975 – 15 November 1985

Personal details
- Born: Frank Trevor Blevins; 3 June 1939 Manchester, England
- Died: 7 September 2013 (aged 74) North Adelaide, South Australia
- Party: Australian Labor Party (SA)

Frank Trevor Blevins (3 June 1939 – 7 September 2013) was an Australian politician and 6th Deputy Premier of South Australia from 1992 to 1993 for the South Australian Branch of the Australian Labor Party. Blevins served in both the Legislative Council from 1975 to 1985 and in the House of Assembly from 1985 to 1997 as the member for Giles (known as Whyalla until 1993). He was a minister in a number of portfolios. In 1983 in a dispute about the use of volunteers in the ambulance service, as minister for Health, he publicly sided with the St. John Council who managed the ambulance service against two unions, the Ambulance Employees Association and the Miscellaneous Workers Association. John Cornwall, reflects that this position probably damaged his credibility at the time, with both unions and the Labor Party. Blevins was Treasurer of South Australia from 1992 to 1993. After Labor's heavy defeat at the 1993 state election, Blevins was the only Labor member from outside Adelaide.

Prior to entering parliament he was a British merchant seaman and then a merchant seaman at Whyalla. He died at his home in 2013.

Political offices
Preceded by Don Hopgood	Deputy Premier of South Australia; 1992 – 1993	Succeeded by Stephen Baker
Preceded by John Bannon	Treasurer of South Australia; 1992 – 1993	Succeeded by Stephen Baker
South Australian House of Assembly
Preceded by Max Brown	Member for Whyalla; 1985–1993	District abolished
New district	Member for Giles; 1993–1997	Succeeded by Lyn Breuer
