= Libertarian Party of Australia =

- Abbreviation: LPA
- Founded: 1977
- Dissolved: Late 1980s
- Split from: Workers Party
- Newspaper: The Libertarian Bulletin
- Ideology: Libertarianism
- Colors: Gold Grey

The Libertarian Party of Australia was an Australian political party based in South Australia. It was formed as a result of a split in the Workers Party over the adoption of the new name "Progress Party".

== History ==
The Libertarian Party was founded in 1977. It had an official publication, known as The Libertarian Bulletin.

The party contested the 1982 Mitcham state by-election, with candidate Victor Kirby achieving only 66 votes.

At the 1983 federal election, the party ran two candidates in South Australia − Kerry Hawkes, who had 1.1% of the vote in Grey, and William Forster in the Senate, who had 0.1% of the vote.

The party disbanded in the late 1980s, having not achieved any elected representatives.

== Later iterations ==
Several other parties with the same name have been founded since the original disbanded, though none have contested elections or been registered.

A 2005 incarnation of the party claimed members in three states, but was not registered with the Australian Electoral Commission for elections because of its small size.

A 2015 incarnation of the party purported to adhere to free market principles very similar to those of the United States Libertarian Party.

On 5 November 2020, a third new incarnation was founded, basing itself on the 1975 platform of the Workers Party. In 2023, it changed its name to Liberty Australia as the Liberal Democratic Party (LDP) had changed its name to the Libertarian Party. As of 2023, the party is not registered with any electoral commissions, although it planned to contest the 2024 New South Wales local elections. The LDP's new name was registered with the Australian Electoral Commission on 12 January 2024.
