= Electoral district of Mitcham (South Australia) =

Former South Australian electoral district

Mitcham South Australia—House of Assembly
- State: South Australia
- Dates current: 1938–1993
- Namesake: Mitcham, South Australia
- Demographic: Metropolitan
- Coordinates: 34°58′S 138°37′E

Mitcham was an electoral district of the House of Assembly in the Australian state of South Australia from 1938 to 1993. The district was based in the south-eastern suburbs of Adelaide.

Mitcham was one of just three metropolitan seats (with Burnside and Torrens) won by the Liberal and Country League in 1965 and 1968.

Mitcham is the only single-member lower house seat in any Parliament in Australia to be won by the Australian Democrats.

Mitcham was superseded by Waite at the 1993 state election.

== Location ==
At the 1938 election, the polling places for the district of Mitcham were: Belair, Blackwood, Colonel Light Gardens, Cottonville, Eden Hills, Hawthorn, the Home for Incurables at Fullarton, Mitcham, Rosefield, Unley Park, Upper Sturt, Westbourne Park and West Mitcham.

== Members for Mitcham ==
Image	Member	Party	Term	Notes
	Henry Dunks (1882–1955)	Liberal and Country	19 March 1938 – 22 March 1955	Previously member for Sturt. Died in office
	Robin Millhouse (1929–2017)	Liberal and Country	7 May 1955 – 2 April 1973	Won by-election. First Australian Democrats parliamentarian. Resigned after accepting position of South Australian Supreme Court justice
	Robin Millhouse (1929–2017)	Liberal Movement	2 April 1973 – 6 May 1976	Won by-election. First Australian Democrats parliamentarian. Resigned after accepting position of South Australian Supreme Court justice
	Robin Millhouse (1929–2017)	New Liberal Movement	6 May 1976 – 9 May 1977	Won by-election. First Australian Democrats parliamentarian. Resigned after accepting position of South Australian Supreme Court justice
	Robin Millhouse (1929–2017)	Democrats	9 May 1977 – 7 April 1982	Won by-election. First Australian Democrats parliamentarian. Resigned after accepting position of South Australian Supreme Court justice
	Heather Southcott (1928–2014)	Democrats	8 May 1982 – 6 November 1982	Won by-election. Lost seat at state election held six months later
	Stephen Baker (1946–)	Liberal	6 November 1982 – 11 December 1993	Deputy Liberal leader from 1990 until 1996. Transferred to Waite after Mitcham abolished. Later served as Deputy Premier

== See also ==
- 1982 Mitcham state by-election
