= Stephen Baker (Australian politician) =

Australian politician

The Honourable Stephen Baker

Deputy Premier of South Australia
- In office 14 December 1993 – 28 November 1996
- Premier: Dean Brown
- Preceded by: Frank Blevins
- Succeeded by: Graham Ingerson

Treasurer of South Australia
- In office 14 December 1993 – 10 October 1997
- Premier: Dean Brown; John Olsen
- Preceded by: Frank Blevins
- Succeeded by: Rob Lucas

Deputy Leader of the South Australian Liberal Party
- In office 12 January 1990 – 28 November 1996
- Leader: Dale Baker; Dean Brown
- Preceded by: Roger Goldsworthy
- Succeeded by: Graham Ingerson

Member for Waite
- In office 11 December 1993 – 10 October 1997
- Preceded by: New Division
- Succeeded by: Martin Hamilton-Smith

Member for Mitcham
- In office 6 November 1982 – 11 December 1993

Personal details
- Born: 30 May 1946 (age 79)
- Party: Liberal Party

Stephen John Baker (born 30 May 1946) was an Australian politician and 7th Deputy Premier of South Australia from 1993 to 1996. Baker represented the Liberal Party in the electoral district of Waite, formerly Mitcham in the House of Assembly.

Hailing from the moderate faction in his party, he won the seat of Mitcham at the 1982 state election from Democrat MP Heather Southcott, the only single-member lower house seat anywhere in Australia to be held by a Democrat. Baker became Deputy Premier and Treasurer in the government of fellow moderate Dean Brown after the 1993 state election, but was deposed as deputy leader in favour of Graham Ingerson when John Olsen was successful in a November 1996 leadership coup. Baker announced his retirement two months before the 1997 state election, which some interpreted as an act of revenge. The hastily conducted preselection resulted in a win for the conservative faction, whose candidate Martin Hamilton-Smith defeated moderate Robert Lawson, which prompted Brown to complain of interference by federal conservative MPs Nick Minchin, Grant Chapman and Andrew Southcott.

Political offices
Preceded by Frank Blevins	Deputy Premier of South Australia; 1993 – 1996	Succeeded by Graham Ingerson
Preceded by Frank Blevins	Treasurer of South Australia; 1993 – 1997	Succeeded by Rob Lucas
Parliament of South Australia
Preceded by Heather Southcott	Member for Mitcham; 1982–1993	District abolished
New division	Member for Waite; 1993–1997	Succeeded by Martin Hamilton-Smith
