= Graham Ingerson =

Australian politician

The Honourable Graham Ingerson

Deputy Premier of South Australia
- In office 28 November 1996 – 7 July 1998
- Preceded by: Stephen Baker
- Succeeded by: Rob Kerin

Deputy Leader of the South Australian Liberal Party
- In office 28 November 1996 – 7 July 1998
- Leader: John Olsen
- Preceded by: Stephen Baker
- Succeeded by: Rob Kerin

Member for Bragg
- In office 14 May 1983 – 8 February 2002
- Preceded by: David Tonkin
- Succeeded by: Vickie Chapman

Personal details
- Born: Graham Alexander Ingerson; 27 August 1941 (age 84)
- Party: Liberal Party

Graham Alexander Ingerson (born 27 August 1941) is a former Australian politician and 8th Deputy Premier of South Australia from 1996 to 1998. Ingerson was a Liberal Party member of the House of Assembly seat of Bragg between 1983 and 2002.

== Career ==
Ingerson held portfolios including Minister for Tourism and Industrial Affairs, Minister for Recreation, Sport and Racing, Minister for Infrastructure, Minister for Police, Minister for Emergency Service, Minister for Racing, Minister for Local Government, Minister for Industry, Trade and Tourism, and Cabinet Secretary (not a Ministerial position).

In August 1998, Ingerson resigned from the ministry over his handling of the racing industry. He was promoted again to Cabinet Secretary in February 2000, but had to resign that in October 2001, over his handling of the Hindmarsh Soccer Stadium. The Opposition described the stadium development as a "41 million dollar white elephant."

=== Post-parliamentary career ===
As of 2016, Ingerson is a registered political lobbyist in the state of South Australia. Notable interests he represents include the Australian Maritime and Fishing Academy, the supermarket chains Foodland, IGA and Romeos, Clean Seas Seafood (listed as The Stehr Group of Companies) and ASX-listed mining company, Terramin.

Political offices
Preceded by Stephen Baker	Deputy Premier of South Australia; 1996 – 1998	Succeeded by Rob Kerin
South Australian House of Assembly
Preceded by David Tonkin	Member for Bragg; 1983 – 2002	Succeeded by Vickie Chapman
Party political offices
Preceded by Stephen Baker	Deputy Leader of the Liberal Party (SA division); 1996 – 1998	Succeeded by Rob Kerin
