= June Appleby =

Australian politician

June Elizabeth Appleby (born 2 June 1941) was an Australian politician who represented the South Australian House of Assembly seats of Brighton from 1982 to 1985 and Hayward from 1985 to 1989 for the Labor Party. She was the Bannon government whip from 1985 to 1989.

Parliament of South Australia
Preceded by Dick Glazbrook	Member for Brighton; 1982–1985	Seat abolished
New seat	Member for Hayward; 1985–1989	Succeeded by Mark Brindal
