= Electoral district of Glenelg (South Australia) =

Former South Australian state electoral district

Coordinates: 34°58′1″S 138°31′19″E

Glenelg South Australia—House of Assembly
- State: South Australia
- Created: 1938
- Abolished: 1985
- Namesake: Glenelg, South Australia
- Demographic: Metropolitan

Glenelg was an electoral district of the House of Assembly in the Australian state of South Australia from 1938 to 1985.

The Holdfast Bay area has long been a conservative stronghold, and Glenelg was one of the few Adelaide-area seats where the Liberal and Country League consistently did well. The pattern was broken at the 1965 state election, when Glenelg was one of two Labor gains that helped Labor finally beat the Playmander and end 33 years of LCL rule. Labor retained the seat even as it lost government in 1968.

Ahead of the 1970 state election, aa major electoral reform gave Adelaide a majority of seats in the legislature. That same reform erased Labor's majority in Glenelg, making it a notional LCL seat. The LCL easily retook the seat even as Labor won a convincing victory. The seat quickly reverted to its traditional status as a safely conservative seat.

Glenelg was abolished in a boundary redistribution prior to the 1985 election with much of the area merged into the seat of Morphett.

== Members ==
Member	Party	Term
William Fisk	Independent	1938–1940
Frank Smith	Liberal and Country	1941–1947
Baden Pattinson	Liberal and Country	1947–1965
Hugh Hudson	Labor	1965–1970
John Mathwin	Liberal and Country	1970–1974
John Mathwin	Liberal	1974–1985
