= Max Brown (politician) =

Australian politician (died 2012)

Maxwell John Brown (died 25 October 2012) was an Australian politician who represented the South Australian House of Assembly seat of Whyalla for the Labor Party from 1970 to 1985.

Parliament of South Australia
Preceded by Ron Loveday	Member for Whyalla; 1970–1985	Succeeded by Frank Blevins
