= Electoral results for the district of Unley =

South Australian district election results

This is a list of electoral results for the Electoral district of Unley in South Australian state elections.

== Members for Unley ==
Member	Party	Term
John McLeay	Independent	1938–1941
Colin Dunnage	Liberal and Country League	1941–1962
Gil Langley	Labor Party	1962–1982
Kym Mayes	Labor Party	1982–1993
Mark Brindal	Liberal Party	1993–2006
David Pisoni	Liberal Party	2006–2026

== Election results ==
=== Elections in the 2020s ===
==== 2026 ====
2026 South Australian state election: Unley
Party	Candidate	Votes	%	±%
Labor	Alice Rolls	9,390	38.4	+6.3
Liberal	Rosalie Rotolo	7,746	31.7	−17.5
Greens	Dylan Kiernan	3,344	13.7	−5.0
One Nation	Jason Wilkinson	2,288	9.4	+9.4
Independent	Ryan Harrison	1,059	4.3	+4.3
Animal Justice	Josip Ivka	314	1.3	+1.3
Real Change	Emma Paterson	183	0.7	+0.7
Australian Family	Peter Attard	142	0.6	+0.6
Total formal votes		24,466	97.2	−1.0
Informal votes		695	2.8	+1.0
Turnout		25,161	91.5	+1.4
Two-candidate-preferred result
Labor	Alice Rolls	13,905	56.8	+9.0
Liberal	Rosalie Rotolo	10,555	43.2	−9.0
Labor gain from Liberal		Swing	+9.0	

==== 2022 ====
2022 South Australian state election: Unley
Party	Candidate	Votes	%	±%
Liberal	David Pisoni	12,019	49.2	−2.7
Labor	Ryan Harrison	7,825	32.1	+8.8
Greens	Georgie Hart	4,577	18.7	+9.6
Total formal votes		24,421	98.2	
Informal votes		439	1.8	
Turnout		24,860	90.1	
Two-party-preferred result
Liberal	David Pisoni	12,737	52.2	−9.4
Labor	Ryan Harrison	11,684	47.8	+9.4
Liberal hold		Swing	−9.4	

Distribution of preferences: Unley
Party	Candidate	Votes	Round 1	
Party	Candidate	Votes	Dist.	Total
Quota (50% + 1)		12,211		
Liberal	David Pisoni	12,019	+718	12,737
Labor	Ryan Harrison	7,825	+3,859	11,684
Greens	Georgie Hart	4,577	Excluded	

=== Elections in the 2010s ===
==== 2018 ====
2018 South Australian state election: Unley
Party	Candidate	Votes	%	±%
Liberal	David Pisoni	12,103	51.7	−3.3
Labor	Geoff Phillips	5,382	23.0	−6.7
SA-Best	Anthony Olivier	2,878	12.3	+12.3
Greens	John Wishart	2,222	9.5	−2.0
Dignity	Anne Watkins	558	2.4	−1.3
SPGN	Dario Centrella	284	1.2	+1.2
Total formal votes		23,427	97.5	−0.6
Informal votes		593	2.5	+0.6
Turnout		24,020	91.6	+2.0
Two-party-preferred result
Liberal	David Pisoni	14,355	61.3	+2.4
Labor	Geoff Phillips	9,072	38.7	−2.4
Liberal hold		Swing	+2.4	

2014 South Australian state election: Unley
Party	Candidate	Votes	%	±%
Liberal	David Pisoni	12,312	55.8	−0.7
Labor	Lara Golding	6,429	29.1	+0.9
Greens	Nikki Mortier	2,481	11.2	−2.2
Dignity for Disability	Joanne Blesing	854	3.9	+3.9
Total formal votes		22,076	98.2	
Informal votes		409	1.8	
Turnout		22,485	91.9	
Two-party-preferred result
Liberal	David Pisoni	13,195	59.8	−2.2
Labor	Lara Golding	8,881	40.2	+2.2
Liberal hold		Swing	−2.2	

2010 South Australian state election: Unley
Party	Candidate	Votes	%	±%
Liberal	David Pisoni	11,691	56.8	+10.4
Labor	Vanessa Vartto	5,774	28.1	−8.5
Greens	Nikki Mortier	2,711	13.2	+3.6
Family First	Luke Smolucha	396	1.9	−0.7
Total formal votes		20,572	98.3	
Informal votes		335	1.7	
Turnout		20,907	91.6	
Two-party-preferred result
Liberal	David Pisoni	12,804	62.2	+10.3
Labor	Vanessa Vartto	7,768	37.8	−10.3
Liberal hold		Swing	+10.3	

=== Elections in the 2000s ===
2006 South Australian state election: Unley
Party	Candidate	Votes	%	±%
Liberal	David Pisoni	8,964	45.5	−6.9
Labor	Michael Keenan	7,324	37.2	+6.8
Greens	Peter Solly	1,937	9.8	+3.7
Democrats	Bruce Hogben	609	3.1	−4.1
Family First	David Kingham	495	2.5	+2.5
Dignity for Disabled	Katharine Annear	362	1.8	+1.8
Total formal votes		19,691	97.4	−0.6
Informal votes		523	2.6	+0.6
Turnout		20,214	90.9	−0.6
Two-party-preferred result
Liberal	David Pisoni	10,064	51.1	−7.9
Labor	Michael Keenan	9,627	48.9	+7.9
Liberal hold		Swing	−7.9	

2002 South Australian state election: Unley
Party	Candidate	Votes	%	±%
Liberal	Mark Brindal	10,598	52.4	+5.0
Labor	Vicki Jacobs	6,152	30.4	+6.0
Democrats	Ingrid Vogelzang	1,447	7.2	−8.1
Greens	Peter Fiebig	1,236	6.1	+6.1
SA First	Franca Zosens	622	3.1	+3.1
One Nation	Clarke Staker	165	0.8	+0.8
Total formal votes		20,220	98.0	
Informal votes		419	2.0	
Turnout		20,639	91.5	
Two-party-preferred result
Liberal	Mark Brindal	11,924	59.0	−0.6
Labor	Vicki Jacobs	8,296	41.0	+0.6
Liberal hold		Swing	−0.6	

=== Elections in the 1990s ===
1997 South Australian state election: Unley
Party	Candidate	Votes	%	±%
Liberal	Mark Brindal	7,873	41.5	−15.2
Labor	Ann Drohan	5,095	26.8	−3.7
Independent	Michael Keenan	3,227	17.0	+17.0
Democrats	Maude Thompson	2,549	13.4	+3.5
United Australia	Tony Parmiter	234	1.2	+1.2
Total formal votes		18,978	96.6	−0.7
Informal votes		660	3.4	+0.7
Turnout		19,638	88.3	
Two-party-preferred result
Liberal	Mark Brindal	10,337	54.5	−7.0
Labor	Ann Drohan	8,641	45.5	+7.0
Liberal hold		Swing	−7.0	

1993 South Australian state election: Unley
Party	Candidate	Votes	%	±%
Liberal	Mark Brindal	11,321	56.7	+13.3
Labor	Kym Mayes	6,107	30.6	−11.9
Democrats	Christopher Kennedy	1,981	9.9	−0.4
Natural Law	Joseph Soos	334	1.7	+1.7
Independent	Gavin McAuliffe	230	1.2	+1.2
Total formal votes		19,973	97.3	−0.1
Informal votes		545	2.7	+0.1
Turnout		20,518	91.6	
Two-party-preferred result
Liberal	Mark Brindal	12,293	61.5	+12.1
Labor	Kym Mayes	7,680	38.5	−12.1
Liberal gain from Labor		Swing	+12.1	

=== Elections in the 1980s ===
1989 South Australian state election: Unley
Party	Candidate	Votes	%	±%
Labor	Kym Mayes	7,662	44.9	−7.1
Liberal	Joy Nimon	7,222	41.5	−1.1
Democrats	Mark Basham	1,732	10.0	+6.0
Independent	Jennie Williams	536	3.0	+3.0
Call to Australia	David Peake	235	1.4	+1.4
Total formal votes		17,387	97.4	+0.7
Informal votes		471	2.6	−0.7
Turnout		17,858	92.8	+2.0
Two-party-preferred result
Labor	Kym Mayes	9,102	52.3	−2.7
Liberal	Joy Nimon	8,285	47.7	+2.7
Labor hold		Swing	−2.7	

1985 South Australian state election: Unley
Party	Candidate	Votes	%	±%
Labor	Kym Mayes	8,797	51.2	+1.3
Liberal	Denis Sheridan	7,314	42.6	−2.5
Nuclear Disarmament	Barbara Boden	685	4.0	+4.0
Independent	Peter Kallas	385	2.2	+2.2
Total formal votes		17,181	96.7	
Informal votes		590	3.3	
Turnout		17,771	90.8	
Two-party-preferred result
Labor	Kym Mayes	9,444	55.0	+3.0
Liberal	Denis Sheridan	7,737	45.0	−3.0
Labor hold		Swing	+3.0	

1982 South Australian state election: Unley
Party	Candidate	Votes	%	±%
Labor	Kym Mayes	7,704	53.2	+6.1
Liberal	Robert Nicholls	5,670	39.1	−4.3
Democrats	Margaret-Ann Williams	804	5.6	−3.9
National	Allan Osmond	314	2.1	+2.1
Total formal votes		14,492	94.9	−0.3
Informal votes		775	5.1	+0.3
Turnout		15,267	92.0	+1.9
Two-party-preferred result
Labor	Kym Mayes	8,209	56.6	+4.3
Liberal	Robert Nicholls	6,283	43.4	−4.3
Labor hold		Swing	+4.3	

=== Elections in the 1970s ===
1979 South Australian state election: Unley
Party	Candidate	Votes	%	±%
Labor	Gil Langley	6,425	47.1	−11.8
Liberal	Robert Nicholls	5,908	43.4	+5.4
Democrats	Albert Apponyi	1,293	9.5	+9.5
Total formal votes		13,626	95.2	−2.3
Informal votes		694	4.8	+2.3
Turnout		14,320	90.1	−0.1
Two-party-preferred result
Labor	Gil Langley	7,119	52.3	−7.8
Liberal	Robert Nicholls	6,503	47.7	+7.8
Labor hold		Swing	−7.8	

1977 South Australian state election: Unley
Party	Candidate	Votes	%	±%
Labor	Gil Langley	8,848	58.9	+6.8
Liberal	Craig Spiel	5,707	38.0	−6.8
Independent	Victoria Wawryk	466	3.1	+3.1
Total formal votes		15,021	97.5	
Informal votes		389	2.5	
Turnout		15,410	90.2	
Two-party-preferred result
Labor	Gil Langley	9,022	60.1	+4.6
Liberal	Craig Spiel	5,999	39.9	−4.6
Labor hold		Swing	+4.6	

1975 South Australian state election: Unley
Party	Candidate	Votes	%	±%
Labor	Gil Langley	7,579	52.1	−6.5
Liberal	Ronald Berryman	3,662	25.2	−10.2
Liberal Movement	Bruce Wark	3,295	22.7	+22.7
Total formal votes		14,536	95.7	−0.6
Informal votes		659	4.3	+0.6
Turnout		15,195	92.5	−0.5
Two-party-preferred result
Labor	Gil Langley	7,991	55.0	−6.1
Liberal	Ronald Berryman	6,545	45.0	+6.1
Labor hold		Swing	−6.1	

1973 South Australian state election: Unley
Party	Candidate	Votes	%	±%
Labor	Gil Langley	8,357	58.6	+3.7
Liberal and Country	Johnny Mac	5,040	35.4	−6.4
Happy Birthday	Susie Creamcheese	855	6.0	+6.0
Total formal votes		14,252	96.3	−1.5
Informal votes		546	3.7	+1.5
Turnout		14,798	93.0	−0.9
Two-party-preferred result
Labor	Gil Langley	8,785	61.6	+6.2
Liberal and Country	Johnny Mac	5,467	38.4	−6.2
Labor hold		Swing	+6.2	

1970 South Australian state election: Unley
Party	Candidate	Votes	%	±%
Labor	Gil Langley	7,916	54.9	
Liberal and Country	Kevin Borick	6,025	41.8	
Democratic Labor	George Basisovs	474	3.3	
Total formal votes		14,415	97.8	
Informal votes		321	2.2	
Turnout		14,736	93.9	
Two-party-preferred result
Labor	Gil Langley	7,986	55.4	
Liberal and Country	Kevin Borick	6,429	44.6	
Labor hold		Swing		

=== Elections in the 1960s ===
1968 South Australian state election: Unley
Party	Candidate	Votes	%	±%
Labor	Gil Langley	8,820	50.8	+0.1
Liberal and Country	Lewis Short	7,689	44.3	−0.6
Democratic Labor	Ted Farrell	852	4.9	+1.2
Total formal votes		17,361	97.5	−0.1
Informal votes		450	2.5	+0.1
Turnout		17,811	92.9	−1.1
Two-party-preferred result
Labor	Gil Langley	8,948	51.5	−0.1
Liberal and Country	Lewis Short	8,413	48.5	+0.1
Labor hold		Swing	−0.1	

1965 South Australian state election: Unley
Party	Candidate	Votes	%	±%
Labor	Gil Langley	9,062	50.7	+0.2
Liberal and Country	John McLeay	8,024	44.9	+1.7
Democratic Labor	Mary Dempsey	660	3.7	+3.7
Independent	John Hennessey	79	0.4	+0.4
Independent	William Wallace	56	0.3	+0.3
Total formal votes		17,881	97.6	+4.9
Informal votes		455	2.4	−4.9
Turnout		18,336	94.0	+1.3
Two-party-preferred result
Labor	Gil Langley	9,229	51.6	−2.0
Liberal and Country	John McLeay	8,652	48.4	+2.0
Labor hold		Swing	−2.0	

1962 South Australian state election: Unley
Party	Candidate	Votes	%	±%
Labor	Gil Langley	9,424	50.5	+8.7
Liberal and Country	Colin Dunnage	8,063	43.2	−7.0
Independent	William Dempsey	1,179	6.3	+6.3
Total formal votes		18,666	97.8	+0.2
Informal votes		425	2.2	−0.2
Turnout		19,091	92.7	−1.0
Two-party-preferred result
Labor	Gil Langley	10,013	53.6	+10.6
Liberal and Country	Colin Dunnage	8,653	46.4	−10.6
Labor gain from Liberal and Country		Swing	+10.6	
