= Electoral results for the district of Bragg =

South Australian district election results

This is a list of electoral results for the Electoral district of Bragg in South Australian state elections.

== Members for Bragg ==
| Member | Party | Term |
|---|---|---|
| David Tonkin | Liberal | 1970–1983 |
| Graham Ingerson | Liberal | 1983–2002 |
| Vickie Chapman | Liberal | 2002–2022 |
| Jack Batty | Liberal | 2022–present |

== Election results ==
=== Elections in the 2020s ===
==== 2026 ====
2026 South Australian state election: Bragg
| Party | Candidate | Votes | % | ±% |
|---|---|---|---|---|
| Liberal | Jack Batty | 11,684 | 48.3 | −5.4 |
| Labor | Rick Sarre | 6,814 | 28.2 | −0.4 |
| Greens | Susan Ditter | 3,219 | 13.3 | +0.7 |
| One Nation | Russell Paterson | 2,211 | 9.2 | +9.1 |
| Australian Family | Robert Walker | 242 | 1.0 | +1.0 |
| Total formal votes | | 24,170 | 98.4 | 0.0 |
| Informal votes | | 386 | 1.6 | 0.0 |
| Turnout | | 23,832 | | |
Two-candidate-preferred result
| Liberal | Jack Batty | 14,145 | 58.5 | +0.3 |
| Labor | Rick Sarre | 10,025 | 41.5 | −0.3 |
| Liberal hold | | Swing | +0.3 | |

==== 2022 by-election ====
Bragg state by-election, 2 July 2022
| Party | Candidate | Votes | % | ±% |
|---|---|---|---|---|
| Liberal | Jack Batty | 11,070 | 50.5 | −3.3 |
| Labor | Alice Rolls | 6,574 | 30.0 | +1.3 |
| Greens | Jim Bastiras | 3,261 | 14.9 | +2.2 |
| Family First | Daryl McCann | 505 | 2.3 | −2.7 |
| Liberal Democrats | James Hol | 347 | 1.6 | +1.6 |
| Independent Freedom Family Life | Neil Aitchison | 175 | 0.8 | +0.8 |
| Total formal votes | | 21,932 | 98.4 | +0.2 |
| Informal votes | | 362 | 1.6 | −0.2 |
| Turnout | | 22,294 | 83.8 | −6.6 |
Two-party-preferred result
| Liberal | Jack Batty | 12,204 | 55.6 | −2.5 |
| Labor | Alice Rolls | 9,728 | 44.4 | +2.5 |
| Liberal hold | | Swing | −2.5 | |

==== 2022 ====
2022 South Australian state election: Bragg
| Party | Candidate | Votes | % | ±% |
|---|---|---|---|---|
| Liberal | Vickie Chapman | 12,751 | 53.8 | −7.6 |
| Labor | Rick Sarre | 6,793 | 28.6 | +5.7 |
| Greens | Michael Petrilli | 3,000 | 12.6 | +4.1 |
| Family First | Daryl McCann | 1,175 | 5.0 | +5.0 |
| Total formal votes | | 23,719 | 98.2 | |
| Informal votes | | 438 | 1.8 | |
| Turnout | | 24,157 | 90.4 | |
Two-party-preferred result
| Liberal | Vickie Chapman | 13,796 | 58.2 | −8.8 |
| Labor | Rick Sarre | 9,923 | 41.8 | +8.8 |
| Liberal hold | | Swing | −8.8 | |

Distribution of preferences: Bragg
| Party | Candidate | Votes | Round 1 | | Round 2 | |
| Party | Candidate | Votes | Dist. | Total | Dist. | Total |
|---|---|---|---|---|---|---|
| Quota (50% + 1) | | 11,860 | | | | |
| Liberal | Vickie Chapman | 12,751 | +418 | 13,169 | +627 | 13,796 |
| Labor | Rick Sarre | 6,793 | +467 | 7,260 | +2,663 | 9,923 |
| Greens | Michael Petrilli | 3,000 | +290 | 3,290 | Excluded | |
| Family First | Daryl McCann | 1,175 | Excluded | | | |

=== Elections in the 2010s ===
==== 2018 ====
2018 South Australian state election: Bragg
| Party | Candidate | Votes | % | ±% |
|---|---|---|---|---|
| Liberal | Vickie Chapman | 14,567 | 63.1 | −0.8 |
| Labor | Rick Sarre | 5,513 | 23.9 | −0.4 |
| Greens | Neil Zwaans | 2,072 | 9.0 | −2.1 |
| Dignity | Taylah Neagle | 927 | 4.0 | +3.8 |
| Total formal votes | | 23,079 | 97.7 | −0.5 |
| Informal votes | | 541 | 2.3 | +0.5 |
| Turnout | | 23,620 | 91.8 | +0.5 |
Two-party-preferred result
| Liberal | Vickie Chapman | 15,566 | 67.4 | +0.3 |
| Labor | Rick Sarre | 7,513 | 32.6 | −0.3 |
| Liberal hold | | Swing | +0.3 | |

2014 South Australian state election: Bragg
| Party | Candidate | Votes | % | ±% |
|---|---|---|---|---|
| Liberal | Vickie Chapman | 15,033 | 65.7 | +2.6 |
| Labor | Ella Waters | 4,958 | 21.7 | +0.1 |
| Greens | Ami Harrison | 2,891 | 12.6 | +0.4 |
| Total formal votes | | 22,882 | 98.3 | +0.2 |
| Informal votes | | 400 | 1.7 | −0.2 |
| Turnout | | 23,282 | 92.7 | +0.3 |
Two-party-preferred result
| Liberal | Vickie Chapman | 15,711 | 68.7 | −1.5 |
| Labor | Ella Waters | 7,171 | 31.3 | +1.5 |
| Liberal hold | | Swing | −1.5 | |

2010 South Australian state election: Bragg
| Party | Candidate | Votes | % | ±% |
|---|---|---|---|---|
| Liberal | Vickie Chapman | 13,726 | 64.0 | +9.1 |
| Labor | Ben Dineen | 4,426 | 20.6 | −6.0 |
| Greens | Brendan Fitzgerald | 2,679 | 12.5 | +2.4 |
| Family First | Nick Zollo | 614 | 2.9 | −1.0 |
| Total formal votes | | 21,445 | 98.0 | |
| Informal votes | | 416 | 2.0 | |
| Turnout | | 21,861 | 92.4 | |
Two-party-preferred result
| Liberal | Vickie Chapman | 15,257 | 71.1 | +9.1 |
| Labor | Ben Dineen | 6,188 | 28.9 | −9.1 |
| Liberal hold | | Swing | +9.1 | |

=== Elections in the 2000s ===
2006 South Australian state election: Bragg
| Party | Candidate | Votes | % | ±% |
|---|---|---|---|---|
| Liberal | Vickie Chapman | 11,143 | 55.9 | −6.0 |
| Labor | Andrew Plimer | 5,310 | 26.6 | +5.6 |
| Greens | Ben Gray | 1,854 | 9.3 | +9.3 |
| Democrats | Janet Kelly | 864 | 4.3 | −6.3 |
| Family First | Paul Hannan | 769 | 3.9 | +1.2 |
| Total formal votes | | 19,940 | 97.7 | −0.2 |
| Informal votes | | 473 | 2.3 | +0.2 |
| Turnout | | 20,413 | 91.7 | −1.3 |
Two-party-preferred result
| Liberal | Vickie Chapman | 12,525 | 62.8 | −6.8 |
| Labor | Andrew Plimer | 7,415 | 37.2 | +6.8 |
| Liberal hold | | Swing | −6.8 | |

2002 South Australian state election: Bragg
| Party | Candidate | Votes | % | ±% |
|---|---|---|---|---|
| Liberal | Vickie Chapman | 12,568 | 61.9 | +0.4 |
| Labor | Karen Atherton | 4,267 | 21.0 | +1.1 |
| Democrats | Julia Grant | 2,150 | 10.6 | −7.4 |
| SA First | John Wood | 614 | 3.0 | +3.0 |
| Family First | Jamilah Lovibond | 551 | 2.7 | +2.7 |
| One Nation | Betty Bedford | 169 | 0.8 | +0.8 |
| Total formal votes | | 20,319 | 97.9 | |
| Informal votes | | 430 | 2.1 | |
| Turnout | | 20,749 | 93.0 | |
Two-party-preferred result
| Liberal | Vickie Chapman | 14,143 | 69.6 | −0.4 |
| Labor | Karen Atherton | 6,176 | 30.4 | +0.4 |
| Liberal hold | | Swing | −0.4 | |

=== Elections in the 1990s ===
1997 South Australian state election: Bragg
| Party | Candidate | Votes | % | ±% |
|---|---|---|---|---|
| Liberal | Graham Ingerson | 11,328 | 60.0 | −13.3 |
| Labor | Anthony Schultz | 3,832 | 20.3 | +5.1 |
| Democrats | Jackie Dearing | 3,712 | 19.7 | +10.6 |
| Total formal votes | | 18,872 | 96.6 | −1.5 |
| Informal votes | | 668 | 3.4 | +1.5 |
| Turnout | | 19,540 | 89.4 | |
Two-party-preferred result
| Liberal | Graham Ingerson | 12,983 | 68.8 | −10.5 |
| Labor | Anthony Schultz | 5,889 | 31.2 | +10.5 |
| Liberal hold | | Swing | −10.5 | |

1993 South Australian state election: Bragg
| Party | Candidate | Votes | % | ±% |
|---|---|---|---|---|
| Liberal | Graham Ingerson | 14,584 | 72.7 | +11.2 |
| Labor | Paul Pilowsky | 3,127 | 15.6 | −9.6 |
| Democrats | Pamela Kelly | 1,844 | 9.2 | −3.5 |
| Natural Law | Richard Barnes | 498 | 2.5 | +2.5 |
| Total formal votes | | 20,053 | 98.1 | −0.1 |
| Informal votes | | 398 | 1.9 | +0.1 |
| Turnout | | 20,451 | 92.7 | |
Two-party-preferred result
| Liberal | Graham Ingerson | 15,790 | 78.7 | +11.3 |
| Labor | Paul Pilowsky | 4,263 | 21.3 | −11.3 |
| Liberal hold | | Swing | +11.3 | |

=== Elections in the 1980s ===
1989 South Australian state election: Bragg
| Party | Candidate | Votes | % | ±% |
|---|---|---|---|---|
| Liberal | Graham Ingerson | 11,585 | 63.8 | −1.3 |
| Labor | Jennifer Richardson | 4,070 | 22.4 | −7.1 |
| Democrats | Margaret-Ann Williams | 2,502 | 13.8 | +8.4 |
| Total formal votes | | 18,157 | 98.3 | +0.3 |
| Informal votes | | 316 | 1.7 | −0.3 |
| Turnout | | 18,473 | 92.8 | +0.9 |
Two-party-preferred result
| Liberal | Graham Ingerson | 12,711 | 70.0 | +2.5 |
| Labor | Jennifer Richardson | 5,446 | 30.0 | −2.5 |
| Liberal hold | | Swing | +2.5 | |

1985 South Australian state election: Bragg
| Party | Candidate | Votes | % | ±% |
|---|---|---|---|---|
| Liberal | Graham Ingerson | 11,719 | 65.1 | −2.9 |
| Labor | Phil Robins | 5,315 | 29.5 | +7.5 |
| Democrats | Alison Dolling | 978 | 5.4 | −4.6 |
| Total formal votes | | 18,012 | 98.0 | |
| Informal votes | | 368 | 2.0 | |
| Turnout | | 18,380 | 91.9 | |
Two-party-preferred result
| Liberal | Graham Ingerson | 12,166 | 67.5 | −5.5 |
| Labor | Phil Robins | 5,846 | 32.5 | +5.5 |
| Liberal hold | | Swing | −5.5 | |

1983 Bragg state by-election
| Party | Candidate | Votes | % | ±% |
|---|---|---|---|---|
| Liberal | Graham Ingerson | 7,969 | 62.6 | −0.4 |
| Labor | Carolyn Pickles | 3,150 | 24.8 | −2.1 |
| Democrats | Guy Harley | 1,559 | 12.6 | +2.5 |
| Total formal votes | | 12,718 | 98.2 | N/A |
| Informal votes | | 237 | 1.8 | N/A |
| Turnout | | 12,955 | 78.5 | N/A |
| Liberal hold | | Swing | N/A | |

1982 South Australian state election: Bragg
| Party | Candidate | Votes | % | ±% |
|---|---|---|---|---|
| Liberal | David Tonkin | 9,177 | 63.0 | −3.0 |
| Labor | Neill Lean | 3,910 | 26.9 | +3.9 |
| Democrats | Guy Harley | 1,475 | 10.1 | −0.9 |
| Total formal votes | | 14,562 | 95.9 | −0.5 |
| Informal votes | | 614 | 4.1 | +0.5 |
| Turnout | | 15,176 | 93.3 | +1.3 |
Two-party-preferred result
| Liberal | David Tonkin | 9,915 | 68.1 | −3.4 |
| Labor | Neill Lean | 4,647 | 31.9 | +3.4 |
| Liberal hold | | Swing | −3.4 | |

=== Elections in the 1970s ===
1979 South Australian state election: Bragg
| Party | Candidate | Votes | % | ±% |
|---|---|---|---|---|
| Liberal | David Tonkin | 9,784 | 66.0 | +0.7 |
| Labor | Carolyn Latta | 3,408 | 23.0 | −11.7 |
| Democrats | Guy Harley | 1,637 | 11.0 | +11.0 |
| Total formal votes | | 14,830 | 96.4 | −1.2 |
| Informal votes | | 547 | 3.6 | +1.2 |
| Turnout | | 15,377 | 92.0 | +0.4 |
Two-party-preferred result
| Liberal | David Tonkin | 10,603 | 71.5 | +6.2 |
| Labor | Carolyn Latta | 4,227 | 28.5 | −6.2 |
| Liberal hold | | Swing | +6.2 | |

1977 South Australian state election: Bragg
| Party | Candidate | Votes | % | ±% |
|---|---|---|---|---|
| Liberal | David Tonkin | 10,134 | 65.3 | +12.8 |
| Labor | Kevin Winn | 5,390 | 34.7 | +7.3 |
| Total formal votes | | 15,524 | 97.6 | |
| Informal votes | | 380 | 2.4 | |
| Turnout | | 15,904 | 91.6 | |
| Liberal hold | | Swing | −4.2 | |

1975 South Australian state election: Bragg
| Party | Candidate | Votes | % | ±% |
|---|---|---|---|---|
| Liberal | David Tonkin | 7,596 | 52.0 | −14.4 |
| Labor | Florence Pens | 4,067 | 27.8 | −5.8 |
| Liberal Movement | Ross Thomas | 2,948 | 20.2 | +20.2 |
| Total formal votes | | 14,611 | 97.2 | −0.1 |
| Informal votes | | 415 | 2.8 | +0.1 |
| Turnout | | 15,026 | 91.8 | −1.7 |
Two-party-preferred result
| Liberal | David Tonkin | 10,242 | 70.1 | +3.7 |
| Labor | Florence Pens | 4,369 | 29.9 | −3.7 |
| Liberal hold | | Swing | +3.7 | |

1973 South Australian state election: Bragg
| Party | Candidate | Votes | % | ±% |
|---|---|---|---|---|
| Liberal and Country | David Tonkin | 9,619 | 66.4 | −0.5 |
| Labor | Florence Pens | 4,863 | 33.6 | +0.5 |
| Total formal votes | | 14,482 | 97.3 | −1.0 |
| Informal votes | | 398 | 2.7 | +1.0 |
| Turnout | | 14,880 | 93.5 | −0.1 |
| Liberal and Country hold | | Swing | −0.5 | |

1970 South Australian state election: Bragg
| Party | Candidate | Votes | % | ±% |
|---|---|---|---|---|
| Liberal and Country | David Tonkin | 9,476 | 66.9 | |
| Labor | Andrew Mack | 4,691 | 33.1 | |
| Total formal votes | | 14,167 | 98.3 | |
| Informal votes | | 244 | 1.7 | |
| Turnout | | 14,411 | 93.6 | |
| Liberal and Country hold | | Swing | | |
