= 2022 Bragg state by-election =

- 2 July 2022

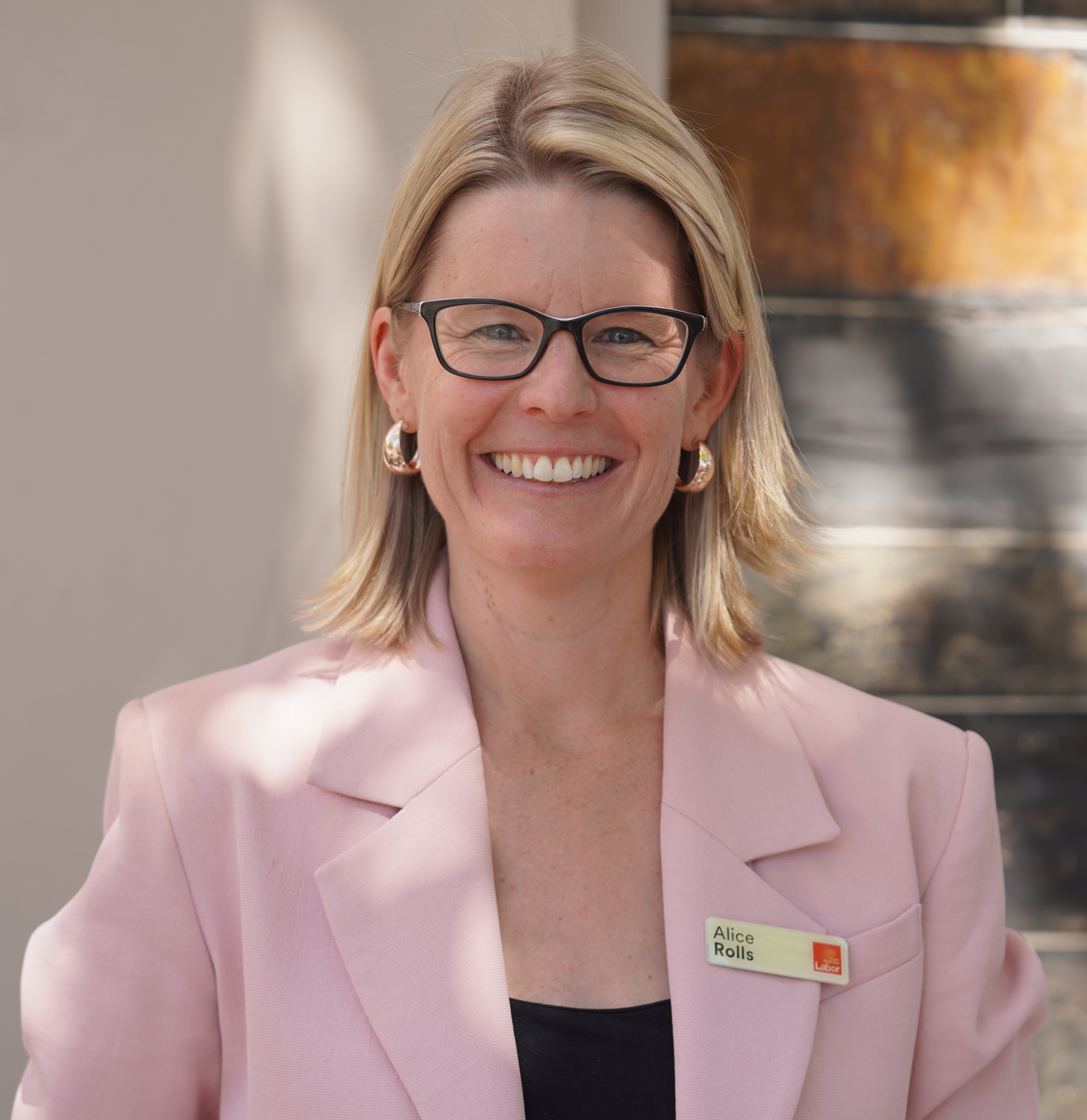

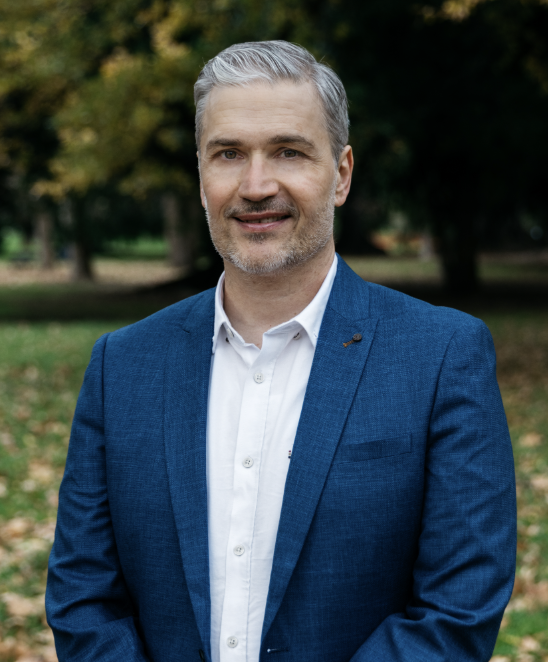
	First party	Second party	Third party
Candidate	Jack Batty	Alice Rolls	Jim Bastiras
Party	Liberal	Labor	Greens
Primary vote	11,070	6,574	3,261
Percentage	50.5%	30.0%	14.9%
Swing	▼3.3pp	▲1.3pp	▲2.2pp
2PP	55.6%	44.4%
2PP swing	▼2.5pp	▲2.5pp
- The electoral district of Bragg (highlighted in green) in the greater Adelaide area.
MP before election
Vickie Chapman
Liberal
Elected MP
Jack Batty
Liberal

A by-election for the seat of Bragg in the South Australian House of Assembly was held on 2 July 2022. The by-election was triggered by the parliamentary resignation of Liberal Party MP and former Deputy Premier Vickie Chapman on 31 May 2022. Jack Batty retained the seat for the Liberal Party, despite a modest swing being recorded against the party.

Alice Rolls of Australian Labor Party (who got the second place in this election) would go on winning Unley in 2026 South Australian state election.

== Background ==
The electorate of Bragg consists of some of the most affluent suburbs in Adelaide's east. As such, it has been a safe seat for the Liberal Party and has always been held by the party or its predecessor, the Liberal and Country League, since its inception in 1970 by at least a 15 percent margin. The 2022 state election saw the closest margin for the Liberals in the seat's history, even though then-incumbent Vickie Chapman still won the seat with 58.2 percent of the two-party-preferred vote, the largest for a Liberal in a metropolitan Adelaide district in the election. Bragg has been represented by three MPs, all of them have been Liberal frontbenchers: David Tonkin, the 38th Premier of South Australia, who held the seat from 1970 to 1983, Graham Ingerson, the 8th Deputy Premier, who held the seat from 1983 to 2002, and Vickie Chapman, the 13th Deputy Premier, who held the seat from 2002 to 2022.

=== 2022 election results ===
2022 South Australian state election: Bragg
Party	Candidate	Votes	%	±%
Liberal	Vickie Chapman	12,751	53.8	−7.6
Labor	Rick Sarre	6,793	28.6	+5.7
Greens	Michael Petrilli	3,000	12.6	+4.1
Family First	Daryl McCann	1,175	5.0	+5.0
Total formal votes		23,719	98.2	
Informal votes		438	1.8	
Turnout		24,157	90.4	
Two-party-preferred result
Liberal	Vickie Chapman	13,796	58.2	−8.8
Labor	Rick Sarre	9,923	41.8	+8.8
Liberal hold		Swing	−8.8	

Distribution of preferences: Bragg
Party	Candidate	Votes	Round 1		Round 2	
Party	Candidate	Votes	Dist.	Total	Dist.	Total
Quota (50% + 1)		11,860				
Liberal	Vickie Chapman	12,751	+418	13,169	+627	13,796
Labor	Rick Sarre	6,793	+467	7,260	+2,663	9,923
Greens	Michael Petrilli	3,000	+290	3,290	Excluded	
Family First	Daryl McCann	1,175	Excluded			

== Dates ==
Date	Event
Wednesday, 1 June 2022	Writ of election issued by the Governor
Tuesday, 14 June 2022	Close of electoral rolls (5 pm)
Friday, 17 June 2022	Close of nominations (12 noon)
Monday, 20 June 2022	Start of early voting
Thursday, 30 June 2022	Last day for applications for postal votes
Saturday, 2 July 2022	Polling day

== Candidates ==
Candidates (in ballot paper order)
Independent	Neil Aitchison	
Labor	Alice Rolls	Lawyer and farmer
Liberal	Jack Batty	Lawyer and political staffer
Greens	Jim Bastiras	Lecturer and community campaigner
Family First	Daryl McCann	Teacher and political commentator
Liberal Democrats	James Hol	Hospitality worker

== Pre-selections ==
The Greens selected Jim Bastiras, a University of Adelaide College lecturer and campaigner against the expansion of White Rock Quarry in Horsnell Gully Conservation Park, which is located in the district.

The Liberal Party held its preselection ballot on 5 June. They selected Jack Batty, a lawyer who served as an aide to Christopher Pyne and George Brandis and ran against then-Premier Jay Weatherill in Cheltenham in 2014, with 113 out of 166 votes cast by local party members. Other people seeking preselection for the Liberals included lawyer Melissa Jones who received 33 votes, businesswoman Cara Miller who received 12 votes, and party staffer Sandy Biar who received eight votes. Jones and Miller had also sought preselection in the electoral district of Waite. Chelsey Potter, party staffer who has criticised the party on issues concerning women after alleging sexual assault, also applied for the preselection process but was rejected for not meeting its party membership requirement. After she had considered running in the by-election as an independent, she ultimately declined to do so.

The Labor Party selected Alice Rolls over Rick Sarre, retired academic and Labor's candidate at the 2018 and 2022 state elections. Rolls, who was described by the party secretary as "a lawyer, a Mum and a part-time farmer", was selected at a state party executive meeting on 8 June.

The Family First Party selected Daryl McCann, a teacher and political blogger at publications such as The Australian, The Spectator, and Quadrant. In a post written before the last election, he positioned himself as a "conservative" opponent to then-incumbent Liberal Vickie Chapman and Labor and Greens candidates whom he claimed to be "progressive".

== Campaign ==
An editor for The Advertiser described the by-election as the first "electoral test" for the Malinauskas government since it took government at the last state election in March. He remarked that campaign posters for Alice Rolls, the Labor candidate, also feature Premier Peter Malinauskas, while Jack Batty, the Liberal candidate campaigned as a “new generation Liberal”.

== Result ==
Bragg state by-election, 2 July 2022
Party	Candidate	Votes	%	±%
Liberal	Jack Batty	11,070	50.5	−3.3
Labor	Alice Rolls	6,574	30.0	+1.3
Greens	Jim Bastiras	3,261	14.9	+2.2
Family First	Daryl McCann	505	2.3	−2.7
Liberal Democrats	James Hol	347	1.6	+1.6
Independent Freedom Family Life	Neil Aitchison	175	0.8	+0.8
Total formal votes		21,932	98.4	+0.2
Informal votes		362	1.6	−0.2
Turnout		22,294	83.8	−6.6
Two-party-preferred result
Liberal	Jack Batty	12,204	55.6	−2.5
Labor	Alice Rolls	9,728	44.4	+2.5
Liberal hold		Swing	−2.5	

== See also ==
- List of South Australian House of Assembly by-elections
