= Bradford College (disambiguation) =

Bradford College is a college in the city of Bradford, England

Bradford College may also refer to:

- Bradford College (United States), a now-defunct college in Haverhill, Massachusetts
- Bradford College (Australia), a college at the University of Adelaide in Adelaide, Australia

== See also ==
- University of Bradford
