= Alice Rolls =

Australian politician and lawyer

The Honourable Alice Rolls MP
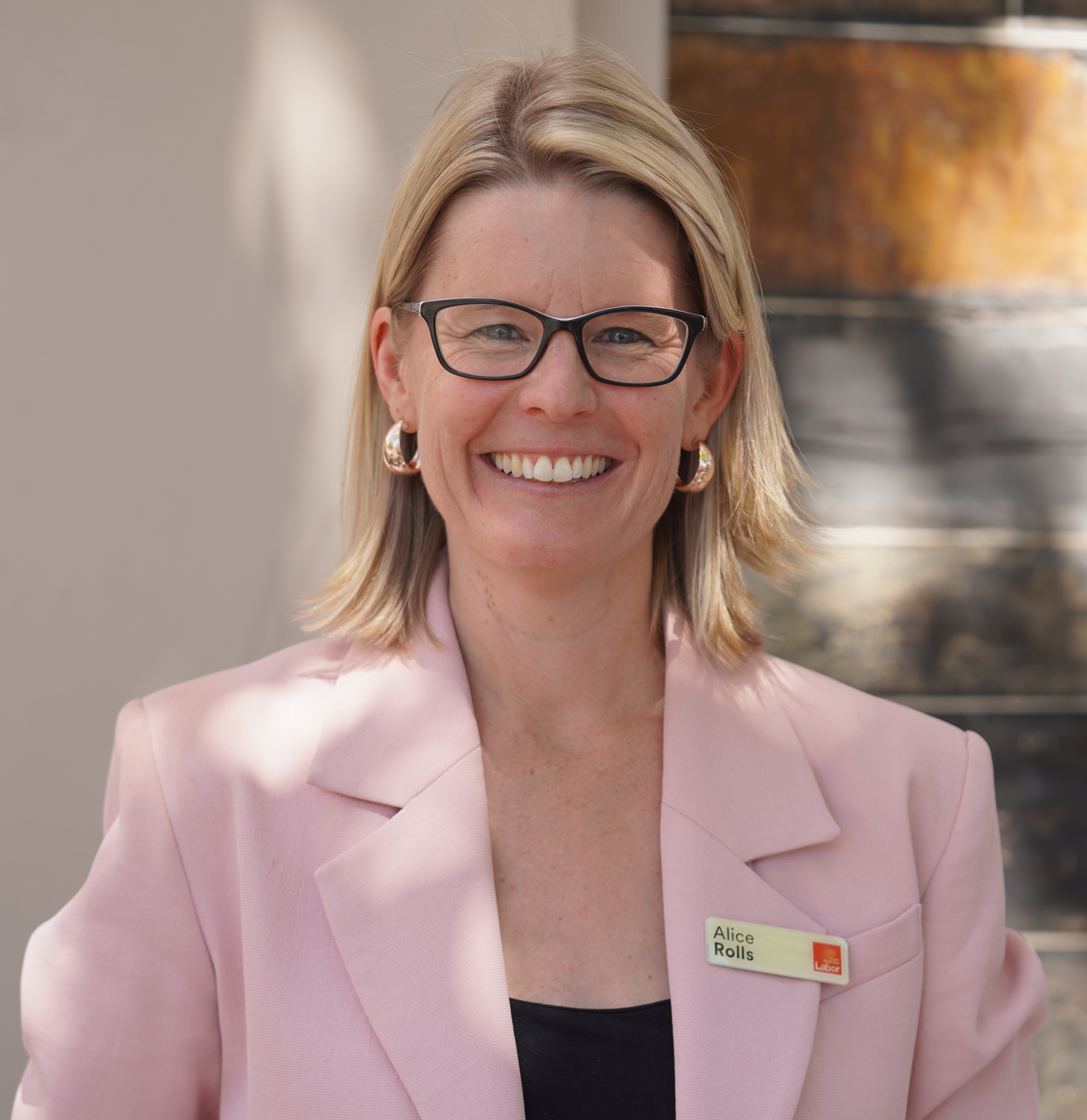
- Rolls in 2026

Minister for Child Protection
- Incumbent
- Assumed office 26 March 2026
- Premier: Peter Malinauskas
- Preceded by: Katrine Hildyard

Minister for Domestic, Family and Sexual Violence
- Incumbent
- Assumed office 26 March 2026
- Premier: Peter Malinauskas
- Preceded by: Katrine Hildyard

Member of the South Australian House of Assembly for Unley
- Incumbent
- Assumed office 21 March 2026
- Preceded by: David Pisoni

Personal details
- Born: Alice Rolls; 1978 or 1979 (age 47–48) (Note: Rolls was 43 as of July 2022, 46 as of September 2025, and 47 as of February 2026.)
- Party: Labor
- Education: University of Melbourne (BA, LLB)
- Profession: Lawyer

Alice Rolls (born 1978 or 1979) is an Australian politician and lawyer, and has represented the district of Unley in the South Australian House of Assembly since the 2026 state election. Rolls is a member of the Australian Labor Party, and has previously stood for the party in the 2022 Bragg state by-election. Rolls is a lawyer and served at the Legal Services Commission of South Australia from 2023.

== Life and career ==
Rolls moved to Australia from South Africa in 1988, at the age of nine. Once in Australia, she was raised in the eastern suburbs of Adelaide. She is the niece of Hugh Corder, a former professor of law at the University of Cape Town.

Rolls attended Pembroke School, graduating in 1995. Rolls then attended the University of Melbourne, graduating with a Bachelor of Arts, a Bachelor of Laws, and a Graduate Diploma in Human Rights Law.

A lawyer and senior member of the Australian Pro Bono Centre, Rolls first entered politics at the 2022 Bragg state by-election, being selected as the Labor candidate in the seat held by Vickie Chapman, a Liberal. Despite a swing in her favour, the Liberal candidate Jack Batty won the by-election.

Rolls was appointed as the inaugural manager of the Civil Law Division of the Legal Services Commission of South Australia in September 2023.

Rolls stood again for the Labor Party at the 2026 South Australian state election in the seat of Unley, held by retiring Liberal MP David Pisoni. She was elected as the MP for Unley, defeating Liberal opponent Rosalie Rotolo. Following the election, Rolls was appointed as Minister for Child Protection and Minister for Domestic, Family and Sexual Violence in the second Malinauskas ministry, which were both previously held by Katrine Hildyard.

== Notes ==
South Australian House of Assembly
Preceded by David Pisoni	Member for Unley; 2026–present	Incumbent
