= Vickie Chapman =

Australian barrister and politician (born 1957)

The Honourable Vickie Chapman
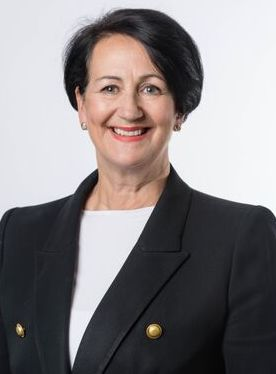
- Chapman in 2018

Deputy Premier of South Australia
- In office 19 March 2018 – 22 November 2021
- Premier: Steven Marshall
- Preceded by: John Rau
- Succeeded by: Dan van Holst Pellekaan

Attorney-General of South Australia
- In office 19 March 2018 – 21 March 2022
- Premier: Steven Marshall
- Preceded by: John Rau
- Succeeded by: Kyam Maher

Deputy Leader of the South Australian Liberal Party
- In office 4 February 2013 – 25 November 2021
- Leader: Steven Marshall
- Preceded by: Steven Marshall
- Succeeded by: Dan van Holst Pellekaan
- In office 30 March 2006 – 4 July 2009
- Leader: Iain Evans; Martin Hamilton-Smith
- Preceded by: Iain Evans
- Succeeded by: Isobel Redmond

Member of the South Australian Parliament for Bragg
- In office 9 February 2002 – 31 May 2022
- Preceded by: Graham Ingerson
- Succeeded by: Jack Batty

Personal details
- Born: Vickie Ann Chapman; 21 June 1957 (age 69) Kingscote, South Australia, Australia
- Party: Liberal
- Spouse: David Ernest Hart (m. 1983; died 2001)
- Relations: Ted Chapman (father)
- Education: University of Adelaide (LLB)
- Profession: Barrister; politician

Vickie Ann Chapman (born 21 June 1957) is an Australian barrister and former politician who served as Deputy Premier of South Australia from 2018 to 2021 and Attorney-General of South Australia from 2018 to 2022 in the government of Steven Marshall. She was the first woman to hold either office. A member of the Liberal Party, she represented Bragg in the South Australian House of Assembly from 2002 to 2022.

Chapman was born in Kingscote and brought up on Kangaroo Island. She studied at Parndana Area School and Pembroke School before attending university, where she studied law at the University of Adelaide. She practiced as a lawyer in her profession and later opened her own law firm. From 1992 to 1995, she became the first female president of the South Australian Liberal Party.

Elected to parliament for the first time in the 2002 state election, she has been the deputy leader of the Liberal Party since 2006 to 2009 and from 2013 to 2018. After the Liberal Party won the 2018 state election, she became the deputy premier and attorney-general. She has also been in charge of the planning and local government portfolios from 2020 to 2021.

Chapman resigned from her position of deputy premier and minister for planning in November 2021 following the motion of no confidence moved against her in the House of Assembly owing to her decision not to approve the port development at Smith Bay, Kangaroo Island. Chapman did not perform the duties of the office of attorney-general and served officially until March 2022. The Ombudsman of South Australia concluded that there was neither conflict of interest nor maladministration in the process of dealing with the application for the port. Chapman kept Bragg in the 2022 state election and left parliament on 31 May 2022.

== Early life, education and legal career ==
Vickie Ann Chapman was born on 21 June 1957 in Kingscote, Kangaroo Island, to Ted Chapman and Patricia Anne Harvey. She was brought up on the island by her father, who went on to represent the area in the South Australian Parliament. She studied at Parndana Area School and then at the age of 16 moved to Adelaide for her senior education at Pembroke School. She pursued law from University of Adelaide.

Chapman commenced her work as a barrister and solicitor in 1979. The first employment for Chapman after graduating from law school was with David Burrell & Co., where she worked on criminal cases, later on moving to aviation and child custody cases. Prior to establishing her own practice, Chapman was working with barristers Ted Mullighan and Brian Martin.

== Early political career ==
=== Liberal Party executive and election to parliament (1992–2002) ===
During her time practising law, Chapman was vice-president of the South Australian Liberal Party. In 1992, she became the first woman president of the South Australian party division, serving from 1992 to 1995. In 1998, Chapman ran for Liberal preselection for the federal Division of Barker. Prior to the 2002 state election, she defeated incumbent Liberal MP Michael Armitage for preselection in Bragg. On 9 February 2002, Chapman won a seat in the South Australian House of Assembly. That November, she contested the leadership of the Liberal deputy, but lost to Iain Evans by 15 votes to five.

=== Opposition and deputy leadership (2002–2018) ===
During her first term, Chapman served on parliamentary committees investigating a code of conduct for MPs, juvenile justice, and the WorkCover Corporation. Following the defeat of the Liberals in the 2006 state election and the resignation of party leader Rob Kerin, Evans took over as party leader and Chapman as deputy leader. She continued to be deputy leader following the 2007 success of Martin Hamilton-Smith over Evans in the leadership ballot.

In July 2009, Chapman challenged Hamilton-Smith for the leadership and was beaten by 11 votes to 10 with one informal vote. Isobel Redmond became her replacement as deputy leader. Following Hamilton-Smith's resignation, she beat Chapman in a second leadership ballot with 13 votes to nine. She did not rule out a challenge to Liberal leader Redmond later on at the 2010 state election, and the Labor Party brought this up during the election campaign. Chapman was re-elected in Bragg, even though the Liberals continued to be in the opposition party.

Following Redmond's resignation from the leadership, Chapman attempted to reclaim her position as deputy leader. She won against Evans by 10 votes to eight on 4 February 2013 in a party room vote. Steven Marshall was elected leader uncontested at the same time. She was a shadow minister responsible for transport and infrastructure and managed to retain her seat in Bragg at the 2014 state election by winning 65.7 per cent of first-preference votes. Chapman was made shadow attorney-general in June 2014 and remained in that post until the change of government in March 2018. During this period, she held shadow ministries for housing and urban development, justice, and state development. She served on the joint committee for the 125th anniversary of women's suffrage in 2017.

== Deputy Premier and Attorney-General ==
=== Ministerial appointments and reforms (2018–2021) ===
Following the Liberals' victory in the 2018 state election, Chapman became the Deputy Premier and Attorney-General of South Australia on 19 March 2018. She was the first woman to serve as either of these ministers in the state.

On 9 July 2018, Chapman introduced a domestic violence reform package which included an offense of non-fatal strangulation, use of body camera footage in criminal proceedings by the South Australia Police, and increased punishment for breaching intervention orders. In May 2019, from 2 to 13 May 2019, she served as the acting premier while Marshall was out of office.

Chapman was briefly responsible for primary industries and regional development from 26 to 29 July 2020, before taking up the planning and local government portfolios from 29 July 2020 to 23 November 2021. On 18 August she revealed that the last part of the implementation of the state's planning system will be postponed in order to provide more time for the users to get acquainted with the Planning and Design Code and the online planning system.

As attorney-general, Chapman requested a review of South Australia's abortion laws by the South Australian Law Reform Institute. She strongly advocated the reform bill initiated in the Legislative Council by Human Services Minister Michelle Lensink on 14 October 2020. The approval of the Termination of Pregnancy Bill in the House of Assembly on 19 February 2021, with 29 votes in favor against 15 votes, was warmly received by Chapman. The modified bill stipulated that two medical professionals had to concur that a termination of pregnancy beyond 22 weeks and six days would be a medically sound procedure. The bill passed into law, becoming the Termination of Pregnancy Act 2021.

Chapman's motion for an inquiry into the matter of workplace harassment in parliament was passed by both chambers in November 2020 through acting Equal Opportunity Commissioner Emily Strickland. In December, she made the appointment of justices Trish Kelly, David Lovell, and Sam Doyle to serve on the newly formed Court of Appeal of South Australia, which started operations in February 2021. In March 2021, following the completion of Strickland's investigation, the House of Assembly passed the amended motion proposed by Chapman for the establishment of a committee to review the report's 16 recommendations.

=== Smith Bay port decision and resignations (2021) ===
On 9 August 2021, Chapman refused an application made by Kangaroo Island Plantation Timbers to construct a deep-water port in Smith Bay, Kangaroo Island. This was due to possible impacts of the project on both the marine environment and local industries. These included biosecurity threats to the aquaculture and tourism sectors. In October, a select committee was appointed in the House of Assembly to investigate how Chapman dealt with the application. She claimed that there was no actual or perceived conflict of interest since herself and her family would not benefit from the decision.

On 18 November 2021, the select committee reported that it had discovered an actual and perceived conflict of interest in the case and referred it to Wayne Lines, South Australian Ombudsman. On the same day, a motion of no confidence was passed against Chapman in the House of Assembly by 23 votes to 22. Marshall claimed that he did not find any breach of the Ministerial Code of Conduct.

Chapman resigned on 23 November as both the deputy premier and the minister for planning and local government. She stepped down from her position as attorney-general until the Ombudsman concluded his inquiry. Chapman was still serving in that position up to 21 March 2022. On 30 November, the House found her guilty of contempt of parliament in respect of misleading statements made to it regarding the proposed port. The House ordered her suspension for six days.

=== Re-election and departure from parliament (2022) ===
Chapman (second from left) with other South Australian Liberal politicians outside Prospect Town Hall at the declaration of the poll for Adelaide on 30 March 2022

Chapman was re-elected in Bragg at the 2022 state election, winning 53.8 per cent of the first-preference vote and 58.2 per cent of the two-party-preferred vote against the Labor candidate, Rick Sarre. On 19 April, she informed her fellow Liberals that she planned to quit politics.

Chapman was sworn in as the member for Bragg on 3 May 2022. On that day, Speaker Dan Cregan presented legal advice indicating that her letter dated 26 April constituted the effective end of her parliamentary membership. Chapman insisted that her resignation would become effective at the end of the month.

The Ombudsman's report on the Smith Bay decision was presented on 3 May. Lines ruled that there was neither actual, potential nor perceived conflict of interest, maladministration or violation of provisions of the Ministerial Code of Conduct by Chapman. Moreover, he believed that adjoining timber plantation would have been logged irrespective of whether the port was approved or not.

Speaking in her farewell speech on 19 May 2022, Chapman called for reunification of South Australia and the Northern Territory. Chapman resigned from the seat of Bragg after 20 years in the parliament on 31 May 2022. Thereafter, the by-election was held on 2 July 2022, in which Jack Batty emerged as the successor to Chapman.

== Post-parliamentary career (2022–present) ==
In March 2023, Chapman delivered a speech at the South Australian launch of Hilma's Network, which is an organisation promoting increased participation of women in the Liberal Party.

In September 2024, Chapman was one of the speakers at the panel discussion Women in the House organised by the University of Adelaide, celebrating the 130th anniversary of female suffrage in South Australia. In November, she was also a guest at the seminar titled The Art of Opposition, which was run by the South Australian branch of the Australasian Study of Parliament Group along with Annette Hurley.

In May 2026, Chapman spoke with Mike Rann and Susan Close at the Future of Democracy luncheon organised by the Committee for Adelaide. At the annual general meeting of the South Australian Liberal Women's Council in 2026, Chapman introduced a motion that would prevent the recording of a speech made by an anti-abortion advocate named Joanna Howe. It was decided by the members that recording should be allowed.

As of 2026, Chapman was a patron of the Kangaroo Island Pioneers Association.

== Honours and recognition ==
The University of Adelaide celebrated Chapman through the Making History banner campaign. Chapman's banner was placed outside the Adelaide Law School along with banners of Julia Gillard and Roma Mitchell. The Adelaide Law School honoured Chapman by presenting her with a copy of the banner during a ceremony.

Chapman has been allowed to keep the title "The Honourable," as indicated in the government gazette issued by Governor Frances Adamson on 29 May 2022.

== Personal life ==
Chapman has three brothers and two paternal half-sisters.

On 9 September 1983, Chapman married David Ernest Hart in Kensington, South Australia. Hart died in 2001.

Parliament of South Australia
Preceded by Graham Ingerson	Member for Bragg; 2002–2022	Succeeded by Jack Batty
Political offices
Preceded by Iain Evans	Deputy Leader of the Opposition in South Australia; 2006–2009	Succeeded by Isobel Redmond
Preceded by Steven Marshall	Deputy Leader of the Opposition in South Australia; 2013–2018	Succeeded by Susan Close
Preceded by John Rau	Deputy Premier of South Australia; 2018–2021	Succeeded by Dan van Holst Pellekaan
Preceded by John Rau	Attorney-General of South Australia; 2018–2022	Succeeded by Kyam Maher
Party political offices
Preceded by Steven Marshall	Deputy Leader of the Liberal Party of Australia (South Australian Division); 2013–2021	Succeeded by Dan van Holst Pellekaan
