= David Pisoni =

Australian politician

The Honourable David Pisoni
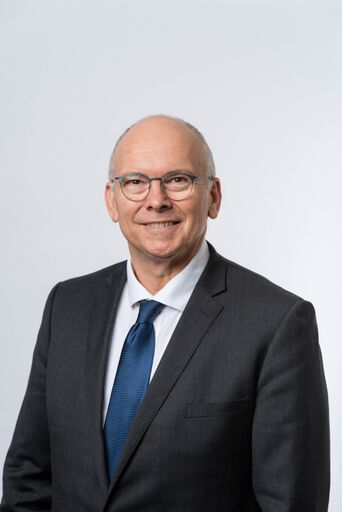

Minister for Industry and Skills Minister for Innovation and Skills
- In office 22 March 2018 – 21 March 2022
- Premier: Steven Marshall
- Preceded by: Tom Koutsantonis (as Minister for State Development and Minister for Small Business)
- Succeeded by: Susan Close (as Minister for Industry, Innovation and Science); Blair Boyer (as Minister for Education, Training and Skills)

Member of the South Australian House of Assembly for Unley
- In office 18 March 2006 – 20 March 2026
- Preceded by: Mark Brindal
- Succeeded by: Alice Rolls

Personal details
- Born: David Gregory Pisoni; 1963 (age 62–63) Elizabeth, South Australia
- Party: South Australian Liberal Party
- Education: Salisbury High School

David Gregory Pisoni (Italian: [piˈzoːni]; born 1963) is a former South Australian politician. He was a member of the South Australian House of Assembly from 2006, representing the electorate of Unley for the South Australian Liberal Party until his retirement at the 2026 election. Pisoni served as the Minister for Industry and Skills (later Innovation and Skills) in the Marshall ministry between March 2018 and March 2022.

== Early life ==
Pisoni was born in Elizabeth, and attended St. Augustine's Primary School and Salisbury High School. He subsequently completed an apprenticeship in a furniture manufacturing business. At the age of 21, he went on to found his own business, manufacturing and retailing fine furniture and training 20 apprentices of his own as the business grew from a backyard operation. Although Adelaide-based, at least half of the company's clients were based interstate and overseas. He operated his business until his election to Parliament.

== Political career ==
Pisoni made a shift into politics at the 2006 state election, after incumbent Unley member Mark Brindal sought preselection for the electoral district of Adelaide. Pisoni then faced Unley mayor and Labor candidate Michael Keenan in the election, and ultimately won the seat in a close result. In January 2007, Pisoni was appointed Shadow Parliamentary Secretary for Multicultural Affairs, Transport, Infrastructure and Energy.

Pisoni was elected to the seat of Unley at the 2006 state election on 51.1 per cent of the two-party-preferred vote, suffering a swing of 7.9 points. Pisoni was re-elected at the 2010 state election on 62.2 per cent of the two-party vote, receiving a swing of 10.3 points. He retained his position as a Shadow Minister holding the same portfolios, but moving from the Public Works Committee to the Social Development Committee.

Pisoni was appointed Shadow Minister for Small Business, Consumer Affairs, Volunteers, Youth and assisting the Leader with Multicultural Affairs on 18 April 2007. After a Shadow Cabinet reshuffle in early 2008, Pisoni was promoted to Shadow Minister for Education and Children's Services, retaining the Small Business and Youth Portfolios. Further Shadow cabinet changes in 2008 saw Pisoni replace the portfolios of Small Business and Youth for key portfolios Employment, Training & Further Education and Early Childhood Development, retaining the Education portfolio. Pisoni served his first term as a member of the Public Works committee.

Pisoni retained the seat at the 2014 Election with a margin of 9.8%. The margin was reduced to 8.9% after the district of Unley's electoral boundary was moved further west of Goodwood Rd to the Belair rail corridor. He continued as the shadow minister for Education (including training) and served on the Parliamentary Economic and Finance Committee until he was appointed the shadow minister for Transport and Infrastructure, after which he served on the Public works Committee until the 2018 election.

Pisoni held the seat of Unley at 2018 election obtaining a 2.4% swing increasing his margin to 11.3% after achieving 51.7% of the primary vote in a 3 cornered contest with the Nick Xenephon-based SA Best Party having secured 12.3% of the primary vote and Labor just 23%.

Pisoni was sworn in as the minister for Industry and Skills (DIS), a machinery of government change. In response to the Joyce Review into key economic departments of the South Australian Government, industry policy shifted to minister David Ridgway and the Department of Trade, Tourism and Investment (DTTI). Migration South Australia and responsibilities for skilled migration move to Pisoni (from DTTI) under the renamed Department of Innovation and Skills (DIS). As the Minister for Innovation and Skills, Pisoni is responsible for delivering on the Marshall government growth agenda in the key areas of Workforce Training and Skills, Apprenticeships and Traineeships, Innovation and Entrepreneurship, Science and Information Economy, Creative Industries (Music, Screen and craft) and Skilled Migration.

Political offices
Preceded by Tom Koutsantonis as Minister for State Development and Minister for Small Business	Minister for Industry and Skills; 2018–2019	Succeeded by Himself as Minister for Innovation and Skills
Preceded by Himself as Minister for Industry and Skills	Minister for Innovation and Skills; 2019–2022	Succeeded by Susan Close as Minister for Industry, Innovation and Science
Preceded by Himself as Minister for Industry and Skills	Minister for Innovation and Skills; 2019–2022	Succeeded by Blair Boyer as Minister for Education, Training and Skills
South Australian House of Assembly
Preceded by Mark Brindal	Member for Unley; 2006–2026	Succeeded by Alice Rolls
