= Mark Brindal =

Australian politician

Member of the South Australian House of Assembly for Unley
- In office 11 December 1993 – 18 March 2006
- Preceded by: Kym Mayes
- Succeeded by: David Pisoni

Member of the South Australian House of Assembly for Hayward
- In office 25 November 1989 – 11 December 1993
- Preceded by: June Appleby
- Succeeded by: Abolished

Personal details
- Born: 12 May 1948 (age 78) South Australia
- Party: Liberal
- Education: University of Adelaide; University of South Australia

Mark Brindal (born 12 May 1948) is a former Australian politician who served in the South Australian House of Assembly from 1989 to 2006, representing the Liberal Party. He was a government minister between 1997 and 2002, under premiers John Olsen and Rob Kerin.

== Early life ==
Brindal was born in South Australia and was educated at Enfield Primary School and the Adelaide Technical High School. He was employed briefly by The Adelaide Advertiser before undertaking tertiary study at the University of Adelaide and the University of South Australia.

Brindal began a teaching career in 1968, working at Cockburn Primary School and Northfield Primary School, before becoming principal of Cook Primary School in 1975. He was seconded to a professional consultancy in educational disadvantage accruing form isolation in 1979. He rose in this position to rural state coordinator. In 1979 he was appointed as an advisor with the Country Areas Program in South Australia. He subsequently became state coordinator of the program.

== Politics ==
Brindal entered parliament at the 1989 election, successfully running for the seat of Hayward. At the 1993 election he ran again, winning the seat of Unley. Prior to 1993 it had been held by the Labor Party. The electoral redistribution ahead of the 2002 election had a large effect on Unley, losing several suburbs west of Goodwood Road and gaining several suburbs east of Fullarton Road, changing Unley from a marginal seat to a fairly safe to safe Liberal seat in one stroke.

He held portfolios including Minister for Water Resources, Minister for Employment and Training, Minister Assisting for Tourism, Minister for Local Government, Minister for Employment, Minister for Youth, Minister Assisting for Environment and Heritage, Member of the Executive Council, and shadow portfolios for Water Resources, Youth, Employment and Training, and Local Government.

The Advertiser reported in late 2005 of Brindal's homosexual affair with a 24-year-old man, who was alleged to have a "mental incapacity", occurring in Brindal's electoral office several times − after allegations of a blackmail by the man's previous foster carer, the then Liberal leader Rob Kerin was subsequently promptly interviewed by members of the anti-corruption branch. Brindal did not contest Liberal preselection for Unley ahead of the 2006 election, but gained Liberal preselection for the marginal Labor seat of Adelaide, however he stepped down from Liberal preselection in Adelaide following the revelations of late 2005 and did not contest the election.

== Later life ==
Following his retirement from politics, Brindal has remained as a consultant and commentator. He has completed his Master of Business Administration at the University of Adelaide. He is currently undertaking his PhD at the School of Agriculture, Food and Wine at the University of Adelaide. His research is in the area of the economics of Water Management.

Political offices
Preceded by Scott Ashenden	Minister for Local Government; 1997–2000	Succeeded by Dorothy Kotz
New title	Minister Assisting for Tourism; 1997–1998	Ministry abolished
Preceded by Joan Hall	Minister for Youth; 1998–2002	Succeeded by Steph Key
New title	Minister Assisting for Environment and Heritage; 1998–2000	Ministry abolished
Preceded by Joan Hall	Minister for Employment; 1998–2000	Succeeded by Himself as Minister for Employment
Preceded by Himself as Minister for Employment and Training	Minister for Employment and Training; 2000–2002	Succeeded by Jane Lomax-Smith as Minister for Employment, Training and Further Education
Vacant Title last held by Susan Lenehan (1992)	Minister for Water Resources; 2000–2002	Vacant Title next held by Karlene Maywald (2007)
Preceded by Dorothy Kotz	Minister for Local Government; 2001–2002	Succeeded by Rory McEwen
Parliament of South Australia
Preceded by June Appleby	Member for Hayward; 1989–1993	Seat abolished
Preceded by Kym Mayes	Member for Unley; 1985–1989	Succeeded by David Pisoni
