= Electoral district of Bragg =

South Australian state electoral district

Bragg South Australia—House of Assembly
- Interactive map of electoral district boundaries from the 2022 state election (Note: The electorate will have no change in boundaries at the 2026 state election.)
- State: South Australia
- Created: 1970
- MP: Jack Batty
- Party: Liberal
- Namesake: William Henry Bragg and William Lawrence Bragg
- Electors: 26,709 (2022)
- Area: 46.11 km^{2} (17.8 sq mi)
- Demographic: Metropolitan
- Coordinates: 34°57′30″S 138°41′39″E
Electorates around Bragg:
Dunstan	Hartley	Morialta
Unley	Bragg	Morialta; Kavel
Waite	Waite	Heysen

Bragg is a single-member electoral district for the South Australian House of Assembly. The seat is named after the eminent physicists Bragg – William Henry and his son, William Lawrence. The electorate is largely suburban and encompasses a significant portion of the City of Burnside, stretching from the east parklands of Adelaide into the Adelaide Hills. After the redistribution following the 2006 election, the boundary moved eastwards to include suburbs that had formerly been in the electorate of Heysen and now borders Kavel. Bragg currently includes the metropolitan suburbs of Beaumont, Burnside, Cleland, Dulwich, Eastwood, Erindale, Frewville, Glenside, Glenunga, Greenhill, Hazelwood Park, Heathpool, Horsnell Gully, Leabrook, Leawood Gardens, Linden Park, Marryatville, Mount Osmond, Rose Park, Rosslyn Park, Skye, St Georges, Stonyfell, Toorak Gardens, Tusmore, Waterfall Gully, Wattle Park and part of Glen Osmond. (Previous suburbs prior to redistribution included Auldana, Beulah Park, Kensington, Kensington Park, and Kensington Gardens.)

The electorate was first contested at the 1970 election as a replacement for the abolished, larger electorate of Burnside, one of fifteen new electorates created in Adelaide to give the metropolitan area fairer representation. It has been held by the Liberals and their predecessors, the Liberal and Country League for its entire existence. Counting its time as Burnside, it has been in LCL/Liberal hands at all times since the introduction of single-member seats in 1938.

Bragg is located in Adelaide's wealthy "eastern crescent," a longstanding non-Labor bastion. Its predecessor seat, Burnside, was one of the few metropolitan LCL strongholds. The Liberals have continued this tradition in Bragg. For most of its existence, it has been the safest Liberal seat in the metropolitan area. Until 2022, they never won less than 60 percent of the two-party vote, and until 2026 won outright majorities on the first count.

As a measure of the strong Liberal support in this seat, the Liberals easily retained it even in the Labor landslides of 1977, 1985, and 2006, each time winning at least 55 percent of the primary vote. For example, in 2006 the Liberals suffered a swing of 6.8 percent in Bragg, but still comfortably retained it with a majority of 12.6 percent–the only safe metropolitan Liberal seat and one of only four safe Liberal seats statewide.

The seat has been held by only four members in its present incarnation. The first three all went on to serve in cabinet. Bragg's best-known member was its first, David Tonkin, who served as Premier of South Australia from 1979 to 1982. He resigned shortly after the Liberals lost the 1982 state election. At the ensuing 1983 Bragg by-election fellow Liberal Graham Ingerson retained the seat without serious difficulty. Ingerson went on to become a minister under Dean Brown and John Olsen and served as deputy premier under Olsen from 1996 to 1998. Ingerson retired in 2002 and was succeeded by Vickie Chapman, two-time Liberal leadership challenger and two-time Liberal deputy leader from 2006 until 2009 and again from 2013 to 2022. In 2018 Chapman became deputy premier.

In 2022, however, the Liberal margin dropped to 58 percent, making it only fairly safe for the first time in its present incarnation. It was still the largest Liberal margin for a metropolitan seat.

On 19 April 2022, Chapman announced her intention to resign from politics and parliament, forcing a by-election, which was held on 2 July 2022. Jack Batty retained the seat for the Liberals with a small swing against him.

At the 2026 election, the Liberal primary vote dropped below 50 percent for the first time in its present incarnation. Batty retained the seat with just over 58 percent of the two-party vote, making him the only Liberal holding a metropolitan seat.

== Members for Bragg ==
Member	Party	Term
David Tonkin	Liberal and Country	1970–1974
David Tonkin	Liberal	1974–1983
Graham Ingerson	Liberal	1983–2002
Vickie Chapman	Liberal	2002–2022
Jack Batty	Liberal	2022–present

== Election results ==
2026 South Australian state election: Bragg
Party	Candidate	Votes	%	±%
Liberal	Jack Batty	11,684	48.3	−5.4
Labor	Rick Sarre	6,814	28.2	−0.4
Greens	Susan Ditter	3,219	13.3	+0.7
One Nation	Russell Paterson	2,211	9.1	+9.1
Australian Family	Robert Walker	242	1.0	+1.0
Total formal votes		24,170	98.4	+0.2
Informal votes		386	1.6	−0.2
Turnout		23,832	91.4	+1.0
Two-party-preferred result
Liberal	Jack Batty	14,145	58.5	+0.4
Labor	Rick Sarre	10,025	41.5	−0.4
Liberal hold		Swing	+0.4	
