= Gil Langley =

Australian sportsperson and politician

Personal information
- Full name: Gilbert Roche Andrews Langley
- Born: 14 September 1919; North Adelaide, South Australia
- Died: 14 May 2001 (aged 81); Fullarton, South Australia
- Batting: Right-handed

International information
- National side: Australia
- Test debut (cap 189): 9 November 1951 v West Indies
- Last Test: 2 November 1956 v India

Career statistics
Competition	Test	First-class
Matches	26	122
Runs scored	374	3236
Batting average	14.96	25.68
100s/50s	0/1	4/12
Top score	53	160*
Catches/stumpings	83/15	291/77
- Source: CricInfo, 12 October 2022

Gilbert Roche Andrews Langley AM (14 September 1919 – 14 May 2001) was an Australian Test cricketer, champion Australian rules footballer and member of parliament, serving as Speaker of the South Australian House of Assembly from 1977 to 1979 for the Don Dunstan Labor government.

Born in North Adelaide, South Australia, Langley attended public schools and gained an apprenticeship as an electrician. He also gained a reputation as an all round sportsman, starring in cricket and Australian rules football as a junior, being coached in both by former Test cricketer and leading footballer Vic Richardson.

== Australian Rules footballer ==
Langley made his debut as a rover for South Australian National Football League (SANFL) club Sturt in 1939, playing 163 games and kicking 341 goals, captaining the club in 1945 and 1947 and winning Sturt's Best and Fairest award in 1945 and 1946. He also played 11 games for South Australia (kicking 19 goals), including a stint as captain and, while stationed in Melbourne in the munitions department during World War II, Langley played four games for Essendon Football Club in the Victorian Football League (VFL), including an appearance in the 1943 VFL Grand Final. He retired from football at the end of the 1950 season.

== Cricketer ==
Langley made his first-class cricket debut as a specialist batsman for South Australia on 14 December 1945 against New South Wales and first kept wicket in first class cricket in December 1947. He immediately made an impression for his tidy work behind the stumps and he was chosen for Australia's 1949–50 tour to South Africa, although he did not play a Test. Langley eventually made his Test debut at the Gabba during the 1951/52 series against the West Indies in place of the injured Don Tallon. He took three catches and four stumpings and, following Tallon's retirement in 1953, became the first choice wicket keeper for Australia until his retirement in 1956.

Langley's skills behind the wicket were recognised by Wisden Cricketers' Almanack, who proclaimed him "the safest wicketkeeper in the game" and named him one of its five cricketers of the year in 1957. He had toured England in 1956 and was one of the few highlights in an outclassed Australian side. In the Lord's Test he completed nine dismissals in Australia's only win of the series. This would stand as the Test record for dismissals by a wicket keeper in a match until it was broken by Bob Taylor in 1980 and stood as an Australian record until 2000. He also made headlines in England when he split his trousers while meeting with the Queen, forcing his teammates Keith Miller and Ian Johnson to hurriedly repair his trousers with safety pins.

Langley played his last Test match against India at Eden Gardens, Kolkata in November 1956 and retired from first class cricket a month later after scoring a century for South Australia against New South Wales at the Adelaide Oval.

Following his retirement from cricket, Langley worked as a sports journalist.

== Rare double ==
Langley achieved a rare double, equalled only by Victor Richardson, of captaining Sturt in both cricket and football.

== Politician ==
Langley entered the South Australian House of Assembly as a Labor Party representative for the Electoral district of Unley at the 1962 South Australian election. He increased his popularity during constituent visits by performing electrical related tasks like fixing toasters. Following the 1965 election, Langley became part of the first Labor government in South Australia for 32 years and would later serve as Speaker of the House of Assembly from 1977 to 1979 before his retirement from politics in 1982. Considered "one of the great and delightful eccentrics" of the South Australian parliament, Langley was an old style Labor politician who had become disillusioned with the direction his party had taken under Don Dunstan on social issues like liberalising homosexuality laws. He was succeeded by Labor's Kym Mayes at the 1982 election.

== Later life ==
In the Australia Day Honours of 1984, Langley was made a member in the general division of the Order of Australia. in 2001 he was named an Inaugural Sturt Football Club Hall of Fame inductee and in recognition of his services to cricket, the Gil Langley Function Room at Adelaide Oval was named in his honour.

He spent much of his retirement playing lawn bowls and died after a long fight with Alzheimer's disease, survived by two sons, two daughters and nine grandchildren.

Langley's nephew, Jeff Langley, played cricket for South Australia and Queensland between 1969–70 and 1979–80.

== See also ==
- List of Australian Test wicket-keepers

South Australian House of Assembly
Preceded by Colin Dunnage	Member for Unley; 1962–1982	Succeeded by Kym Mayes
Preceded by Ted Connelly	Speaker of the South Australian House of Assembly; 1977–1979	Succeeded by Bruce Eastick
