= Kym Mayes =

Australian politician

The Honourable Kym Mayes

Member of the South Australian Parliament for Unley
- In office 6 November 1982 – 11 December 1993
- Preceded by: Gil Langley
- Succeeded by: Mark Brindal

Personal details
- Born: April 23, 1947 (age 78)
- Party: Labor Party
- Spouse: Carolyn Burrows
- Education: BEc
- Alma mater: Flinders University

Milton Kym Mayes (born 23 April 1947) was an Australian politician who represented the South Australian House of Assembly seat of Unley from 1982 to 1993 for the Labor Party. He was a minister for various portfolios from 1985 to 1993.

Political offices
Preceded by Frank Blevins	Minister for Agriculture; 1985–1989	Succeeded by Lynn Arnold
Preceded by Scott Ashenden	Minister for Fisheries; 1985–1989	Succeeded by Dorothy Kotz
Preceded by Jack Slater	Minister for Recreation and Sport; 1985–1992	Succeeded by Greg Crafter
Preceded by Lynn Arnold	Minister for Employment and Further Education; 1989	Succeeded by Mike Rann
Preceded by Barbara Wiese	Minister for Youth Affairs; 1989	Succeeded by Mike Rann
Preceded by Terry Hemmings	Minister for Housing and Construction; 1989-1992	Succeeded by Greg Crafter as Minister for Housing, Urban Development and Local Government Relations
Preceded by Terry Hemmings	Minister for Public Works; 1989-1992	Ministry abolished
Preceded by Scott Ashenden	Minister for Environment and Land Management; 1992-1993	Succeeded by Himself as Minister for Environment and Natural Resources
Preceded by John Klunder	Minister for Emergency Services; 1992-1993	Succeeded by Wayne Matthew
Preceded by Mike Rann	Minister for Aboriginal Affairs; 1992-1993	Succeeded by Michael Armitage
Preceded by Himself as Minister for Environment and Land Management	Minister for Environment and Natural Resources; 1993	Succeeded by David Wotton
Parliament of South Australia
Preceded by Gil Langley	Member for Unley; 1982–1993	Succeeded by Mark Brindal
