= University of Adelaide College =

University-preparatory school in South Australia

Coordinates: 34°55′26″S 138°36′16″E

The University of Adelaide College is the preferred pathway provider to the University of Adelaide and offers programs that lead to the first or second year of undergraduate and postgraduate studies at the university. The college is located a short distance away from the university campus in the city centre of Adelaide, Australia, with students receiving a student card that grants them access to its facilities. Approximately 800 students are enrolled each year from Australia and abroad.

The University of Adelaide College was known as Bradford College until 2016. Its current director is Siobhan Guy.

Programs include Foundation Studies (to enter the 1st Year of an undergraduate degree), Degree Transfer (to enter the 2nd Year of an undergraduate degree), Pre-Master's (to enter the 1st Year of a postgraduate degree) and General Academic English. For students needing to develop their English language skills prior to undertaking a Foundation Studies, Degree Transfer or Pre-Master's Program at the University of Adelaide College, the appropriate number of weeks of General Academic English can be completed beforehand.
