= Electoral district of Unley =

South Australian state electoral district

Unley South Australia—House of Assembly
- Interactive map of electoral district boundaries from the 2022 state election (Note: The electorate will have no change in boundaries at the 2026 state election.)
- State: South Australia
- Created: 1938
- MP: Alice Rolls
- Party: Labor
- Namesake: Unley, South Australia
- Electors: 26,211 (2018)
- Area: 14.1 km^{2} (5.4 sq mi)
- Demographic: Metropolitan
- Coordinates: 34°57′5″S 138°37′0″E
Electorates around Unley:
West Torrens	Adelaide	Bragg
Badcoe	Unley	Bragg
Elder	Waite	Waite

Unley is a single-member electoral district for the South Australian House of Assembly. Named after the suburb of the same name, it is the state's smallest electorate by area at just 14.1 km^{2} (5.4 sq mi). According to the Electoral Commission of South Australia, the electoral district of Unley includes the suburbs of Fullarton, Goodwood, Hawthorn, Highgate, Hyde Park, Kings Park, Kingswood, Malvern, Myrtle Bank, Netherby, Parkside, Unley, Unley Park, Urrbrae, and Wayville. It also includes part of Millswood.

== History ==
Unley was created as a conservative seat. It was first contested at the 1938 election, where it was held by conservatives until the 1962 election, when Gil Langley captured the seat for Labor. Unley was one of the seats that put Labor in government at the 1965 election after decades of the Playmander in opposition, with Labor managing to retain Unley in the close 1968 and 1975 elections and the 1979 election loss. Langley was succeeded by Labor's Kym Mayes at the 1982 election, a state government minister. In the close 1989 election Labor again managed to retain Unley. However, Mayes was heavily defeated at the 1993 election landslide by Liberal Mark Brindal on a swing of over 12 percent, on paper turning Unley from marginal Labor to safe Liberal at one stroke. Brindal went on to serve as a minister in the government of John Olsen.

The electoral redistribution ahead of the 2002 election had a large effect on Unley, which lost several suburbs west of Goodwood Road while gaining several suburbs east of Fullarton Road, changing Unley from a marginal seat to a fairly safe to safe Liberal seat. This helped Brindal retain Unley with only a small swing against him as the Liberals lost government.

Brindal relinquished preselection of Unley prior to the 2006 election, contesting instead the electoral district of Adelaide held by the then Minister for Education, Jane Lomax-Smith. Despite a statewide Labor landslide, David Pisoni narrowly won with a 51 percent two-party vote despite a challenge from City of Unley mayor and Labor candidate Michael Keenan. It reverted to a fairly safe to safe Liberal seat until David Pisoni retired, after serving as the member for 20 years, at the 2026 Election.

== Members for Unley ==
Member	Party	Term
John McLeay Sr.	Independent	1938–1941
Colin Dunnage	Liberal and Country	1941–1962
Gil Langley	Labor	1962–1982
Kym Mayes	Labor	1982–1993
Mark Brindal	Liberal	1993–2006
David Pisoni	Liberal	2006–2026
Alice Rolls	Labor	2026–present

== Election results ==
2026 South Australian state election: Unley
Party	Candidate	Votes	%	±%
Labor	Alice Rolls	9,390	38.4	+6.3
Liberal	Rosalie Rotolo	7,746	31.7	−17.5
Greens	Dylan Kiernan	3,344	13.7	−5.0
One Nation	Jason Wilkinson	2,288	9.4	+9.4
Independent	Ryan Harrison	1,059	4.3	+4.3
Animal Justice	Josip Ivka	314	1.3	+1.3
Real Change	Emma Paterson	183	0.7	+0.7
Australian Family	Peter Attard	142	0.6	+0.6
Total formal votes		24,466	97.2	−1.0
Informal votes		695	2.8	+1.0
Turnout		25,161	91.5	+1.4
Two-party-preferred result
Labor	Alice Rolls	13,905	56.8	+9.0
Liberal	Rosalie Rotolo	10,555	43.2	−9.0
Labor gain from Liberal		Swing	+9.0	
