= Jack Batty =

Australian politician

Jack Batty MP
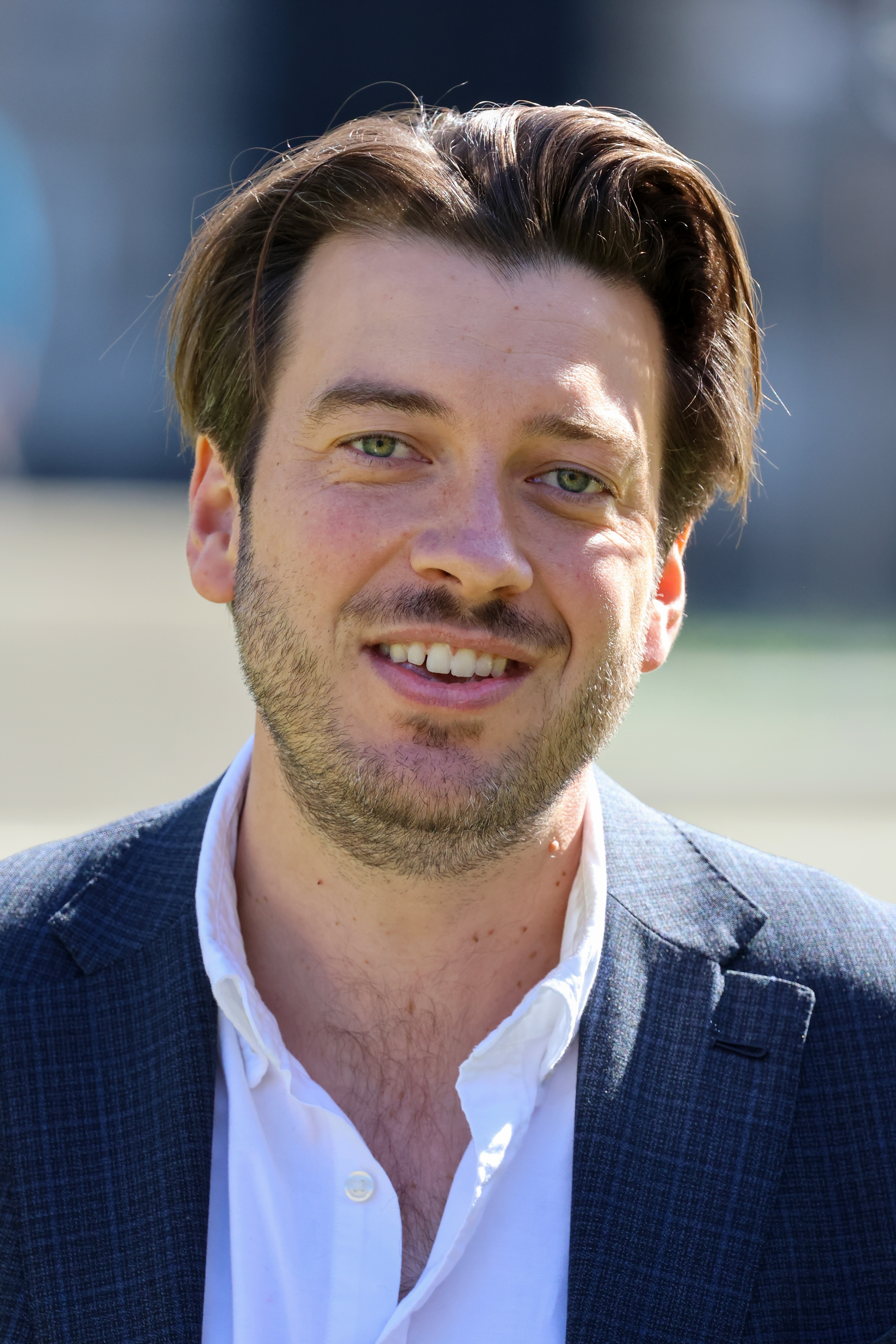
- Batty in 2026

Member of the South Australian House of Assembly for Bragg
- Incumbent
- Assumed office 2 July 2022
- Preceded by: Vickie Chapman

Personal details
- Born: Jack Andrew Batty; 14 October 1990 (age 35) North Adelaide, South Australia
- Party: Liberal
- Spouse: Charlotte
- Education: Saint Ignatius' College (1997–2005) and Scotch College (2006–2008)
- Alma mater: University of Adelaide
- Profession: Lawyer

Jack Andrew Batty (born 14 October 1990) is an Australian politician. He has been a Liberal member of the South Australian House of Assembly since a July 2022 by-election, representing the electorate of Bragg.

He attended Saint Ignatius' College and Scotch College, and completed a Bachelor of Economics, a Bachelor of Laws and a Graduate Diploma in Legal Practice from the University of Adelaide.

Prior to entering politics, Batty was a lawyer, a staffer for federal minister Christopher Pyne and an aide to High Commissioner to the United Kingdom George Brandis. He was the Liberal candidate for the safe Labor seat of Cheltenham at the 2014 state election.

Batty and his wife Charlotte grew up in the eastern suburbs of Adelaide and bought their first home there around 2015.

Parliament of South Australia
Preceded by Vickie Chapman	Member for Bragg; 2022–present	Incumbent
