= Rick Sarre =

Australian academic

- Born: Warwick Turner Sarre; 25 July 1955 (age 71); Adelaide, South Australia
- Occupations: Lawyer, academic
- Spouse: Debra Sarre
- Children: 2

Academic background
- Education: LLB, MA, PhD
- Alma mater: University of Adelaide

Warwick Turner (Rick) Sarre (born 25 July 1955) is an Australian legal scholar and Emeritus Professor of Law and Criminal Justice at the University of South Australia.

== Education and career ==
Sarre completed his secondary education at King's College in Kensington Park, South Australia (1968–1972). He holds a Bachelor of Laws from the University of Adelaide (1976), a Master of Arts in Criminology from the University of Toronto (1983), and a Doctor of Juridical Science from the University of Canberra (2002). He was awarded an honorary Juris Doctor from Umeå University, Sweden in 2015, and completed a PhD at the University of South Australia in 2023.

Sarre taught at the University of South Australia for 35 years, serving as Head of the School of Law and Legal Practice (1992–1998) and Dean of the Law School (2019–2020).

Sarre served as President of the Australian and New Zealand Society of Criminology (2012–2016) and was awarded Fellow status in 2018. He is a Fellow of the Australian Academy of Law and an Honorary Professorial Fellow of the Australian Institute of Police Management.

Additional service includes Past President of the South Australian Council for Civil Liberties and South Australian Patron of the Justice Reform Initiative.

Sarre has been a member of the Australian Labor Party since 1984. He has lived in Adelaide's eastern suburbs throughout his life. He has been a candidate for the Labor Party in the federal seat of Sturt (2010, 2013) and the state seat of Bragg (2018, 2022, 2026).

== Recognition ==
Awards include the Carrick citation from the Australian Learning and Teaching Council (2008), Research Excellence Award from the Division of Business (2006), and Life Membership of Pembroke School (2024).

== Books ==
Sarre has authored and co-authored numerous books, including:

- Preventing Crime: What We Know, and What We Need to Do (2024)
- Life Actually: A Feast of 500-Word Memories (2021)
- Religion Matters: The Contemporary Relevance of Religion (co-editor with P.T. Babie, 2020)
- Bail in Australia: Legislative Provisions and Current Challenges (co-author with Max Travers, Emma Colvin, et al., 2021)
- Crime and Justice in Australia: 2000 and Beyond (co-editor, 2018)
